= History of the Panama Canal =

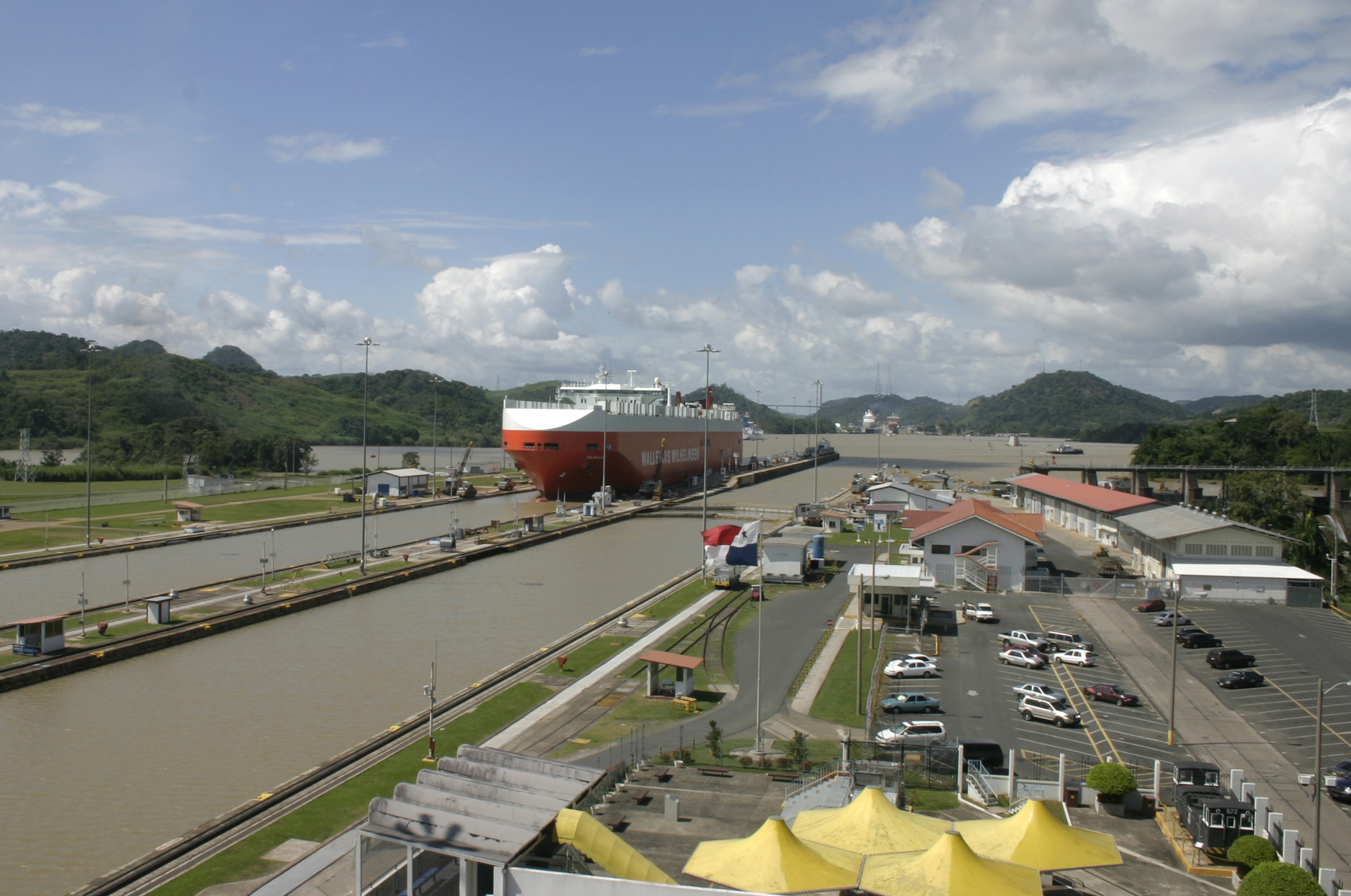
Miraflores Locks in 2004

In 1513 the Spanish conquistador Vasco Núñez de Balboa first crossed the Isthmus of Panama. When the narrow nature of the Isthmus became generally known, European powers noticed the possibility to dig a water passage between the Atlantic and Pacific Oceans.

A number of proposals for a ship canal across Central America were made between the sixteenth and nineteenth centuries. The chief rival to Panama was a canal through Nicaragua.

By the late nineteenth century, technological advances and commercial pressure allowed construction to begin in earnest. French entrepreneur Ferdinand de Lesseps led the initial attempt (1880–1889) to build a sea-level canal, as he had previously achieved in the building of the Suez Canal (1859–1869). A concession to build the canal was obtained from the Colombian government, at that time the possessor of the Panama Isthmus. The canal was only partly completed, as a result of the severe underestimation of the difficulties in excavating the rugged terrain, heavy personnel losses to tropical diseases, and increasing difficulties in raising finances. The collapse of the French canal company (1889) was followed by a political scandal surrounding alleged corruption in the French government. In 1894, a second French company (the Compagnie Nouvelle du Canal de Panama) was formed to take over the assets of the original French company, with the intention of finding a prospective buyer.

Interest in a U.S.-led canal effort developed in the late 1890s, and was considered a priority by President Theodore Roosevelt (1901–1909). Roosevelt gained Congressional support to buy the French canal concession and equipment, despite a longstanding preference amongst political leaders and the public for the Nicaragua route. After encountering resistance from the Colombian government to what they considered unfair terms, Roosevelt gave his support to a group of Panamanians seeking to secede from Colombia. He then signed a treaty with the new Panamanian government enabling the project. The critical decisions by which the U.S. took over construction of the canal were heavily influenced by the lobbyists William Nelson Cromwell and Philippe Bunau-Varilla, acting on behalf of the Compagnie Nouvelle du Canal de Panama. The terms of the treaty between the U.S. and Panama heavily favored American interests, and remained a source of tension between Panama and the United States until the signing of the Torrijos–Carter Treaties in 1977.

The Americans' success in constructing the canal hinged on two factors. First was converting the original French sea-level plan to a more realistic lock-controlled canal. The second was controlling the diseases which had decimated workers and management alike under the original French attempt. The Americans' chief engineer John Frank Stevens (the second Chief Engineer of the American-led project) built much of the infrastructure necessary for later construction. Following his resignation, the new chief engineer was George Washington Goethals, whose tenure saw the completion and opening of the canal. Goethals divided the workload into three divisions: Atlantic, Central, and Pacific. The Central division, overseen by Major David du Bose Gaillard, was responsible for the most daunting task, the excavation of the Culebra Cut through the roughest terrain on the route. Almost as important as the engineering advances were the healthcare advances made during the construction, led by William C. Gorgas, an expert in controlling tropical diseases such as yellow fever and malaria. Gorgas was one of the first to recognize the role of mosquitoes in the spread of these diseases and, by focusing on controlling the mosquitoes, greatly improved worker conditions.

On 7 January 1914, the French crane boat Alexandre La Valley became the first to traverse the entire length of the canal, and on 1 April 1914 the construction was officially completed with the hand-over of the project from the construction company to the Panama Canal Zone government. The outbreak of World War I caused the cancellation of any official "grand opening" celebration, but the canal officially opened to commercial traffic on 15 August 1914 with the transit of the SS Ancon.

During World War II, the canal proved vital to American military strategy, allowing ships to transfer easily between the Atlantic and Pacific. Politically, the canal remained a territory of the United States until 1977, when the Torrijos–Carter Treaties began the process of transferring territorial control of the Panama Canal Zone to Panama, a process which was finally completed on 31 December 1999.

The Panama Canal continues to be a viable commercial venture and a vital link in world shipping, and is periodically upgraded. A Panama Canal expansion project started construction in 2007 and began commercial operation on 26 June 2016. The new locks allow the transit of larger Post-Panamax and New Panamax ships, which have greater cargo capacity than the original locks could accommodate.

== Early proposals in Panama ==
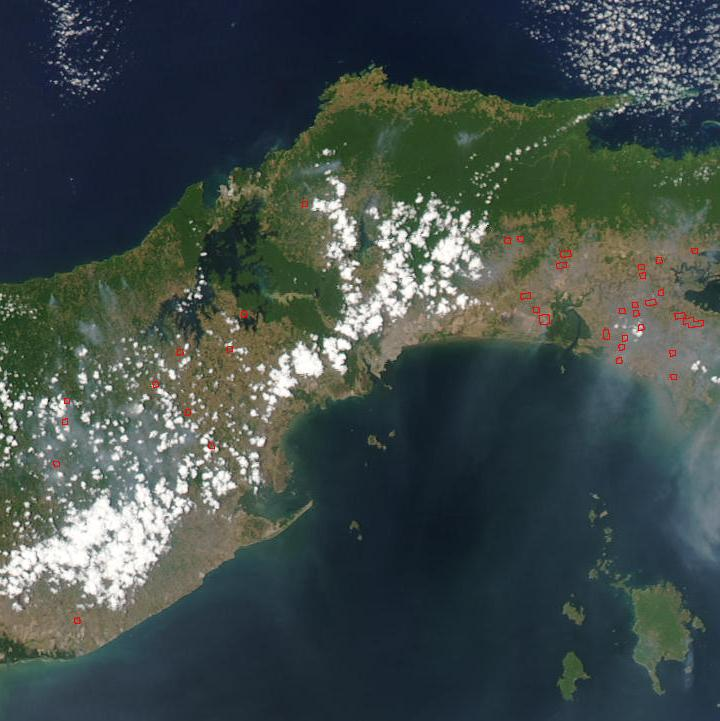
Satellite image showing the location of the Panama Canal: dense jungles are visible in green, topped by clouds

=== 16th-18th centuries ===
The first to conceive the idea of the Panama Canal was the Spanish conquistador Vasco Núñez de Balboa, who first crossed the Isthmus of Panama in 1513. He wrote in his journal the possibility of a canal but did not take action. Instead, the first trans-isthmian route was established to carry the plunder of Peru to Spain from Panama to Nombre de Dios.

In 1534, seeking to gain a military advantage over the Portuguese, the Spanish ruler Charles V, Holy Roman Emperor ordered a survey for a route through the Americas in order to ease the voyage for ships traveling between Spain and Peru.

In 1668, the English physician and philosopher Sir Thomas Browne speculated in his encyclopedic work, Pseudodoxia Epidemica, that "some Isthmus have been eaten through by the Sea, and others cut by the spade: And if the policy would permit, that of Panama in America were most worthy the attempt: it being but few miles over, and would open a shorter cut unto the East Indies and China".

Given the strategic location of Panama, and the potential of its narrow isthmus separating two great oceans, other trade links in the area were attempted over the years. One early example of this was the ill-fated Darien scheme, launched by the Kingdom of Scotland in 1698 to set up an overland trade route. Generally inhospitable conditions thwarted the effort, and it was abandoned in April 1700. In 1788, Americans suggested that the Spanish should build the canal, since they controlled the colonies where it would be built. They said that this would be a less treacherous route for ships than going around the southern tip of South America, and that tropical ocean currents would naturally widen the canal after construction. During an expedition from 1788 to 1793, Alessandro Malaspina outlined plans for construction of a canal.

=== 19th century ===
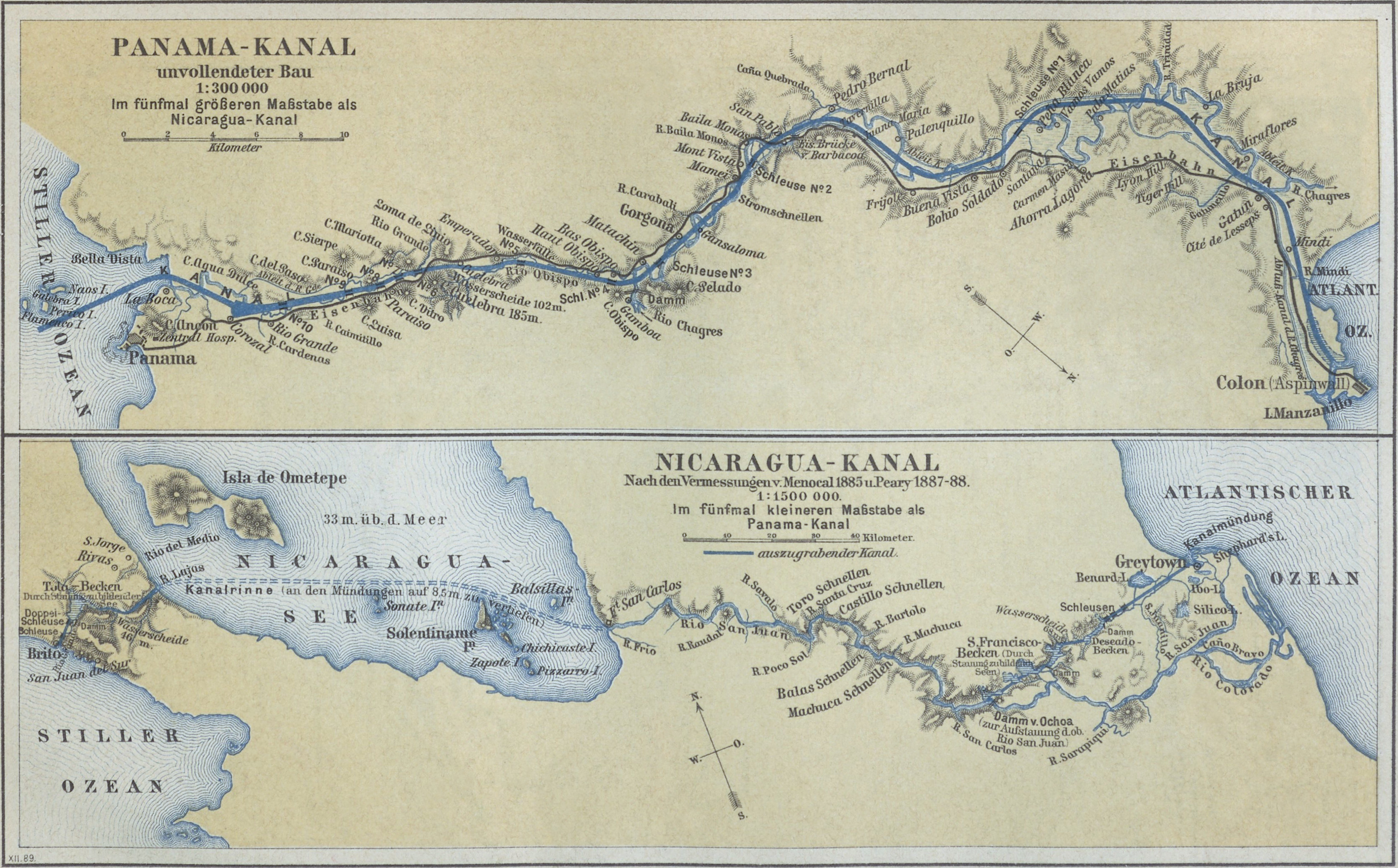
1890 German map of a projected Panama Canal (above) and an alternate Nicaragua route (below)

The idea of a canal across Central America was revived during the early 19th century. In 1811, the German naturalist Alexander von Humboldt published an essay on the geography of the Spanish colonies in Central America (Essai politique sur le royaume de la Nouvelle Espagne; translated into English as: Political essay on the kingdom of New Spain containing researches relative to the geography of Mexico). In the essay, Humboldt considered five potential routes for a canal across Central America: (1) across the Isthmus of Tehuantepec in Mexico; (2) across Nicaragua, traversing Lake Nicaragua; (3) across Panama from Limón Bay to Panama City (the route later built); (4) across the Darién Gap along the Atrato and Napipi Rivers, then continuing down to Cupica Bay on the Pacific side; and (5) also in the Atrato region, along the "Lost Canal of the Raspadura", a legendary canal built by local inhabitants. Of the five routes, Humboldt considered the Nicaragua route the most promising and the Panama route the least promising options, partly because he estimated the mountains at Panama to be three times their actual elevation. Because of his prestige as a scientist, Humboldt's assessment became definitive for many through the nineteenth century.

In 1819, the Spanish government authorized the construction of a canal and the creation of a company to build it.Numerous canals were built in other countries in the late 18th and early 19th centuries. The success of the Erie Canal through central New York in the United States in the 1820s and the collapse of the Spanish Empire in Latin America resulted in growing American interest in building an inter-oceanic canal. Beginning in 1826, US officials began negotiations with Gran Colombia (present-day Colombia, Venezuela, Ecuador, and Panama), hoping to gain a concession to build a canal. Protective of their newly gained independence and fearing domination by the more powerful United States, president Simón Bolívar and New Granada officials declined American offers.

The United Kingdom attempted to develop a canal in 1843. According to the New-York Daily Tribune, 24 August 1843, Barings Bank of London and the Republic of New Granada entered into a contract for the construction of a canal across the Isthmus of Darien. They referred to it as the Atlantic and Pacific Canal, and it was a wholly British endeavor. These plans for the canal led in 1848 to the capture of San Juan de Nicaragua, at the Caribbean Sea end of the projected canal, by a British gunboat. A diplomatic crisis between the British and the United States was averted by the Clayton–Bulwer Treaty, in which the two nations bound each other to joint control of any canal built in Nicaragua or (by implication) anywhere in Central America.

In 1846, the Mallarino–Bidlack Treaty, negotiated between the U.S. and New Granada, granted the United States transit rights and the right to intervene militarily in the isthmus. In 1848, the discovery of gold in California generated renewed interest in a canal crossing between the Atlantic and Pacific Oceans. William Henry Aspinwall, who had won the federal subsidy to build and operate the Pacific mail steamships at around the same time, benefited from the gold discovery. Aspinwall's route included steamship legs from New York City to Panama, and from Panama to California, with an overland portage through Panama. This route with an overland leg in Panama was soon frequently traveled, as it provided one of the fastest connections between San Francisco, California, and the U.S.' East Coast, about 40 days' transit in total. Nearly all the gold shipped out of California went by the fast Panama route. Several new and larger paddle steamers were soon plying this new route, including private steamship lines owned by American entrepreneur Cornelius Vanderbilt that made use of an overland route through Nicaragua, and the unfortunate SS Central America.

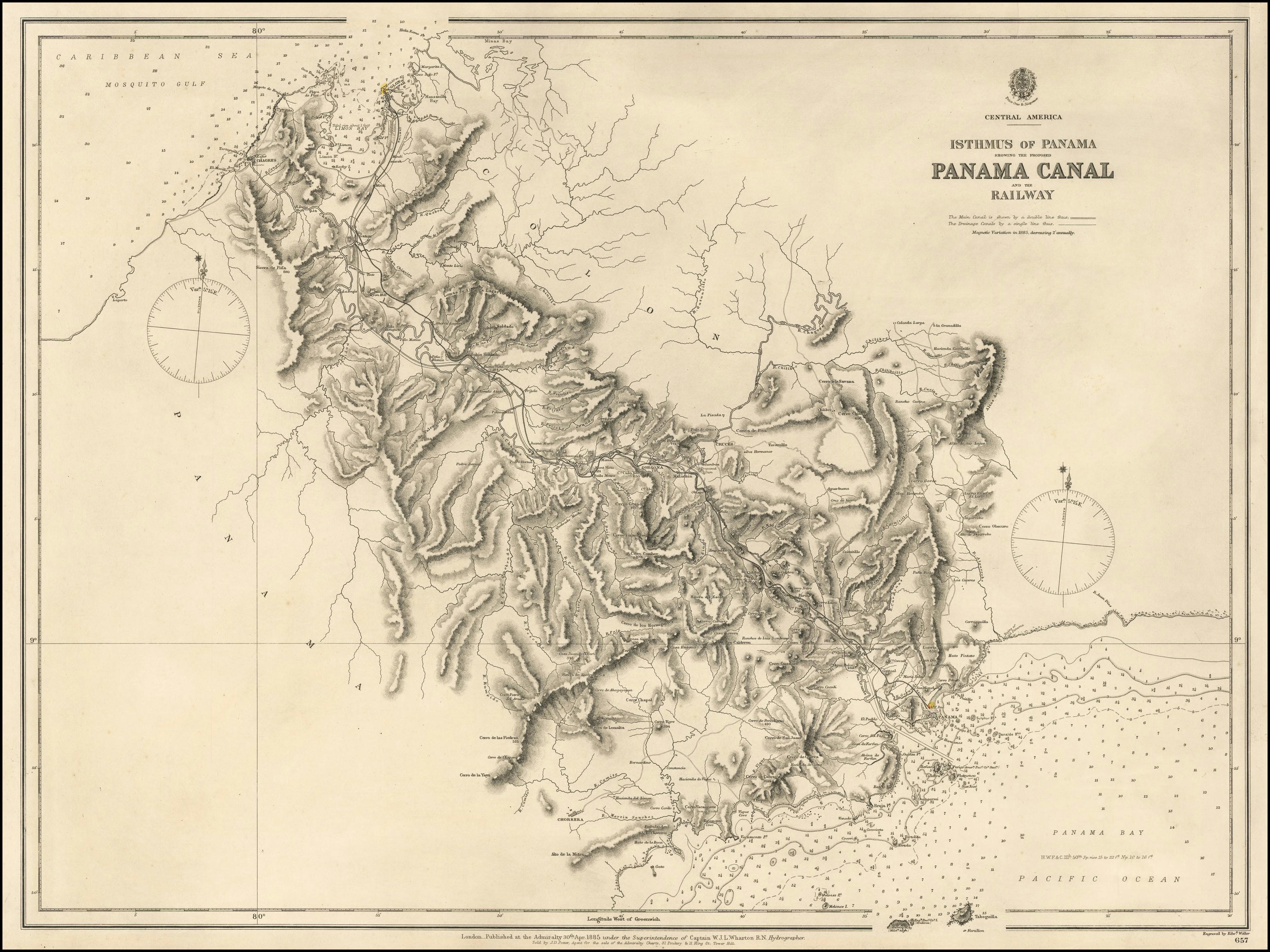
1885 map showing the Railway and the proposed Panama Canal route

In 1850, Aspinwall founded the Panama Railroad Company, together with explorer John Lloyd Stephens and banker Henry Chauncey. The Company sought to build a railroad across the Isthmus of Panama from Limón Bay on the Caribbean Sea to Panama City on the Pacific Ocean. The initial estimate was that the railroad would take two years to build; it eventually opened in 1855, and cost US$8 million, six times the originally-estimated cost. The railroad also produced a high number of fatalities, as workers succumbed to diseases such as cholera, smallpox, dysentery and malaria. The cost in human life is unknown, but is estimated between six and twelve thousand. The overland link nonetheless became a vital piece of Western Hemisphere infrastructure, greatly facilitating trade. The later canal route was constructed parallel to it, as it had helped clear dense forests.

An all-water route between the oceans was still the goal. In 1855, William Kennish, a Manx-born engineer working for the United States government, surveyed the isthmus and issued a report on a route for a proposed Panama Canal. His report was published as a book entitled The Practicability and Importance of a Ship Canal to Connect the Atlantic and Pacific Oceans.

In 1870, U.S. President Ulysses S. Grant established an Interoceanic Canal Commission, which included Chief of Engineers Brigadier General Andrew A. Humphreys as its members. It commissioned several naval officers to investigate the possible routes suggested by Humboldt for a canal across Central America. One of those sent was Commander Thomas Selfridge, who made three expeditions in 1870 and 1873 to Darién, establishing that nowhere in the region was suitable for an interoceanic canal. Ultimately, the commission decided in favour of Nicaragua, establishing this as the preferred route amongst American policy-makers.

== French project ==
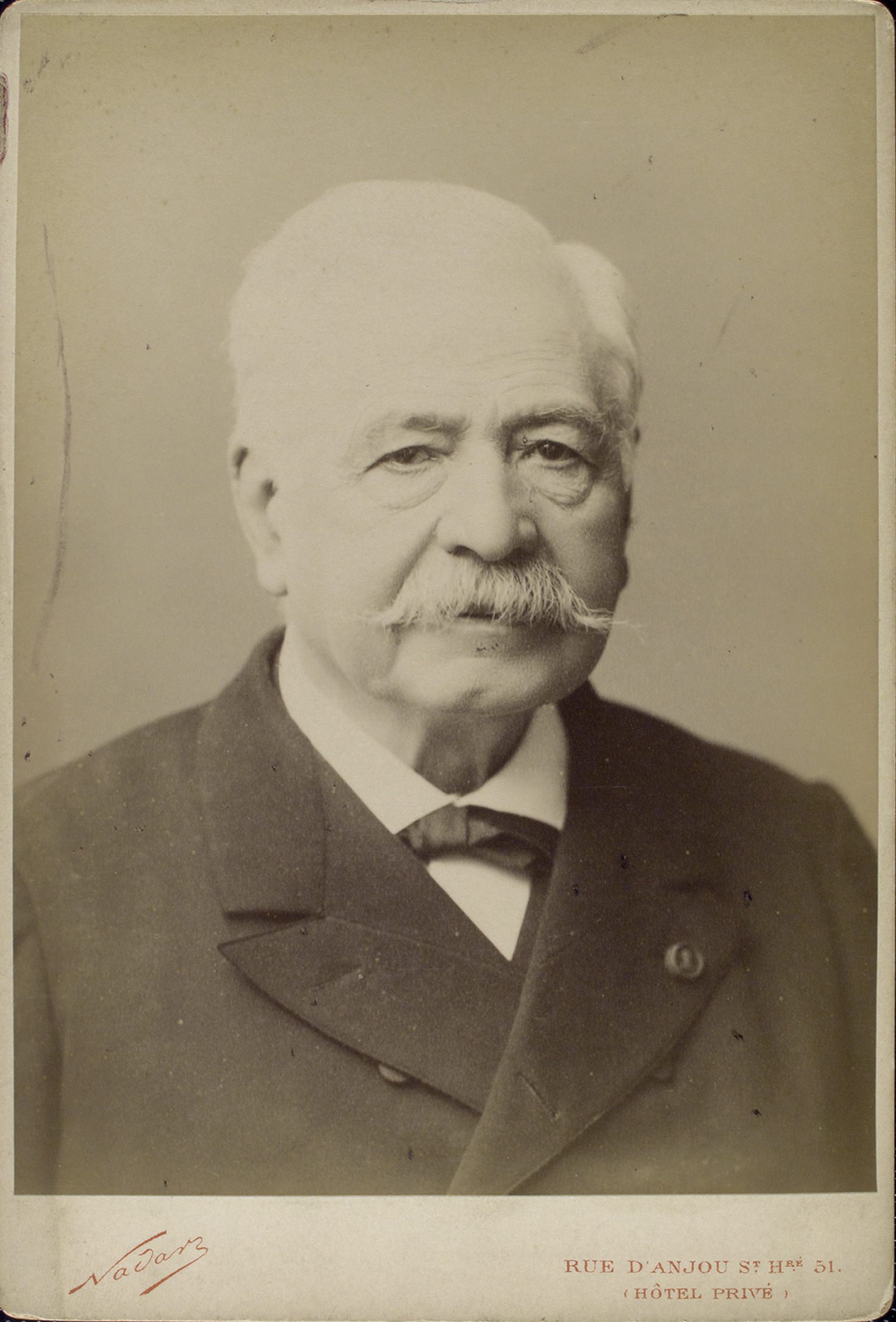
Ferdinand de Lesseps, the French originator of the Suez Canal and the Panama Canal.

=== Conception (1875-1879) ===
==== Preliminary investigations and the Wyse Concession (1875-1878) ====
The French entrepreneur Ferdinand de Lesseps had been the driving force behind the construction of the Suez Canal (1859-1869). Despite the opposition of many who considered the canal impracticable (including British engineer Robert Stephenson), de Lesseps succeeded in completing the canal. The opening of the Suez Canal on 17 November 1869 was an international gala event. The canal soon proved its value to international trade in making a direct sea-level connection between the Mediterranean Sea and the Indian Ocean, avoiding the need to sail around Africa.

The success of the Suez Canal encouraged de Lesseps to consider further schemes. He was encouraged by influential members of French society, who considered that another great engineering success would help restore public confidence in France, badly dented by its humiliation in the Franco-Prussian War (1870-1871).

In 1875, de Lesseps was approached by the Société Civile Internationale du Canal Interocéanique de Darien (also known as the "Türr Syndicate"). The syndicate had been formed to promote the building of an interoceanic canal across Panama. Its directors were Hungarian freedom fighter István Türr, financier Jacques de Reinach and Türr's brother-in-law Lt Lucien Bonaparte-Wyse.

At the request of de Lesseps, the Türr Syndicate obtained permission from the government of Colombia (which at that time controlled Panama) to conduct explorations in the Darién-Atrato region. In November 1876, the syndicate sent an expedition headed by Bonaparte-Wyse and Lt Armand Reclus to the region to find and survey a canal route. The expedition struggled with the arduous terrain and with illness, including malaria, from which three members of the party died. They returned to Paris six months later, thoroughly discouraged. Their report to de Lesseps proposed constructing a canal involving locks and a tunnel up to nine miles long. De Lesseps rejected this report, declaring that he would only accept a recommendation to build a sea-level canal along the route of the Panama Railroad.

In December 1877, the Türr Syndicate sent Bonaparte-Wyse and Reclus on a second expedition to Panama, this time concentrating on the route of the Panama Railroad. Lt Reclus carried out a cursory inspection of the terrain around Panama City, while Bonaparte-Wyse rode by horseback to Bogotá, where he obtained a concession from the Colombian government to build a canal across Panama (20 March 1878). The agreement, known as the "Wyse Concession" was valid 99 years and allowed the company to dig a canal and exploit it.

Returning to Paris, Bonaparte-Wyse and Reclus submitted a report to de Lesseps, claiming that a sea-level canal across the Panama isthmus was feasible. The Hungarian engineer Béla Gerster, who had been a junior member of both expeditions, wrote a minority report dissenting from their conclusions, but was unable to find a publisher.

==== International Congress (1879) ====
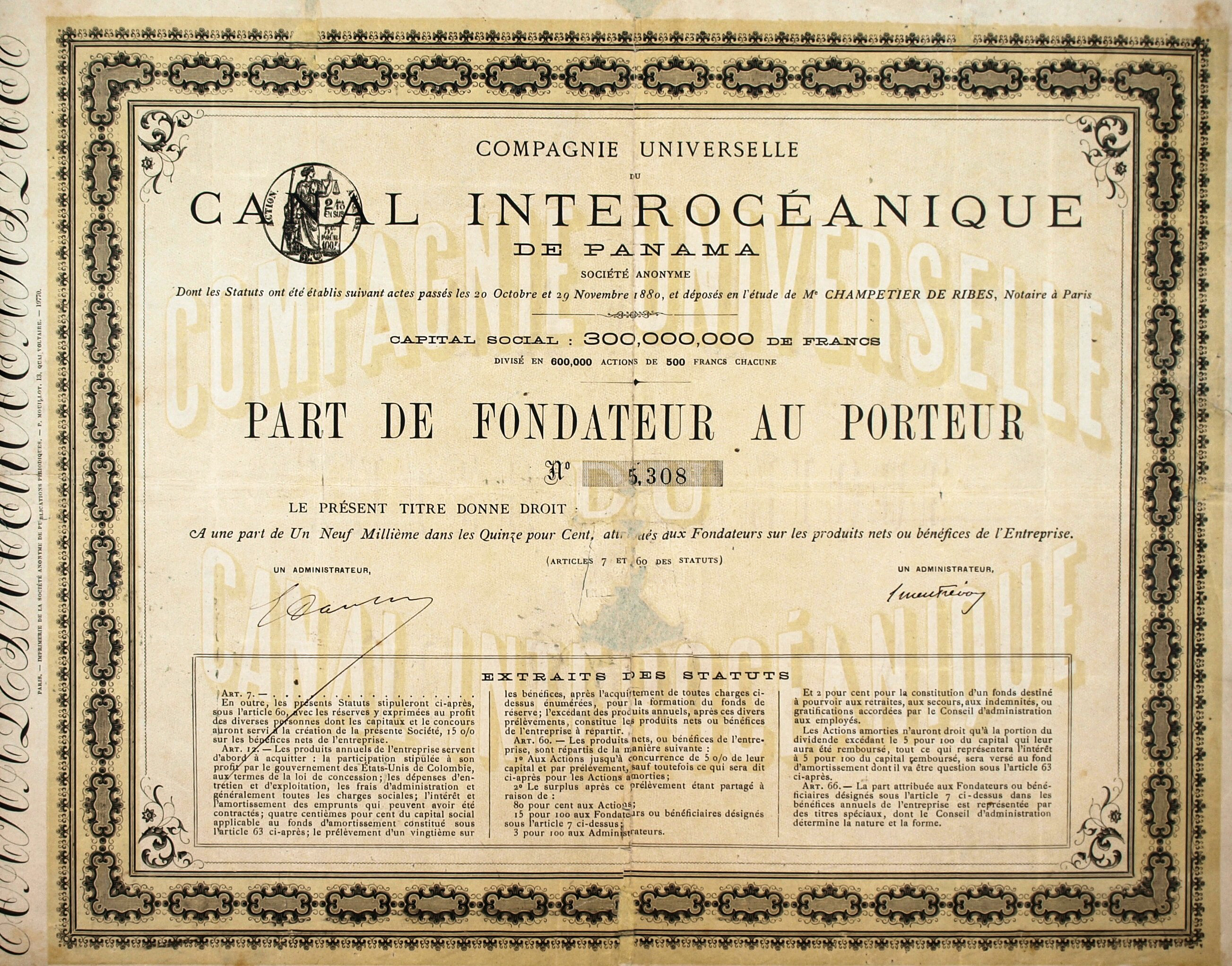
Part de Fondateur of the Compagnie Universelle du Canal Interocéanique de Panama, issued 29 November 1880

In May 1879, Ferdinand de Lesseps convened an international congress in Paris to examine the possibilities of a ship canal across Central America, the Congrès International d'Etudes du Canal Interocéanique (in English: International Congress for Study of an Interoceanic Canal). Among the 136 delegates of 26 countries, 42 were engineers and made technical proposals before the congress. The others were speculators, politicians, and friends of de Lesseps, for whom the purpose of this congress was only to launch fundraising by legitimizing de Lesseps' own decision, based on the Lucien Bonaparte-Wyse and Armand Reclus plan, through a so-called international scientific approval, since he was convinced that a sea-level canal, dug through the mountainous spine of Central America, could be completed at least as easily as the Suez Canal.

In reality, only 19 engineers approved the chosen plan, and only one of those had actually visited Central America. While the Americans abstained because of their own plan through Nicaragua, the five delegates from the French Society of Engineers all refused. Among them were Gustave Eiffel and Adolphe Godin de Lépinay, the general-secretary of the Société de Géographie, who was the only one to propose a lake-and-locks project. Designer in particular of the large-gauge canal between Bordeaux and Narbonne, the road between Sétif and Bougie, and of the railway lines connecting Philippeville to Constantine, Algeria, Algiers to Constantine, and Athens to Piraeus, he also supervised the construction of a rail link between Veracruz and Córdoba, Mexico, losing two-thirds of his workers to tropical disease. Godin de Lépinay's plan was to build a dam across the Chagres River in Gatún, near the Atlantic, and another on the Rio Grande, near the Pacific, to create an artificial lake accessed by locks. Digging less and avoiding unsanitary work and the danger of flooding was his priority, with an estimated lower cost of $100,000,000 (equivalent to $3.336206897×10^{9} in 2025) and 50,000 lives saved, as mentioned in the motivation for his negative review of de Lesseps' plan. Regrettably, his plan was not seriously considered by the other delegates. Had it been adopted, the Panama Canal might well have been completed by the French rather than the United States.

The American delegation, headed by Aniceto García Menocal, presented its plan to build a lock canal connecting the Atlantic and Pacific channels through Lake Nicaragua. Menocal was Cuban by birth and had been assigned by Admiral Daniel Ammen to the Grant commission surveys in Nicaragua and Panama. The American plan was well organized and persuasively presented, very nearly upsetting de Lesseps' carefully orchestrated plans. However, again, this was not to be.

On Friday May 23, de Lesseps convened a general session. Striding before a large map, he addressed the congress for the first time. He spoke without notes in simple, direct language, and with great confidence. According to him, the map showed that the single best route was through Panama, along the route already chosen by the Panama railroad. It was self-evident that a sea level canal was the correct type of canal to build, as at Suez, and also that Panama was the only possible place to build it. Naturally there would be difficulties, but they would be overcame, as they had at Suez. His speech was clear and convincing, enthralling his audience.

Following de Lesseps' speech, the Technical Committee formally recommended building a sea-level canal through Panama. This action did not occur without protest: before the vote, half the committee formally walked out. They were persuaded to return, and the vote was formally taken. The resolution in favor of a sea-level canal through Panama passed with 74 in favor and 8 opposed. The "no" votes included de Lépinay and Gustave Eiffel. Thirty-eight Committee members were absent and 16, including Ammen and Menocal, abstained. The predominantly French "yea" votes did not include any of the five delegates from the French Society of Engineers. Of the 74 voting in favor, only 19 were engineers and of those, only one, Pedro Sosa of Panama, had ever been in Central America.

The engineering congress estimated the cost of the de Lesseps project at $214 million; on February 14, 1880, an engineering commission revised the estimate to $168.6 million. De Lesseps further reduced this estimate twice, with no apparent justification: on February 20 to $131.6 million and on March 1 to $120 million. The congress estimated seven or eight years as the time required to complete the canal; de Lesseps reduced this estimate to six years (the Suez Canal had required ten).

==== Founding of the Compagnie Universelle du Canal Interocéanique de Panama (1880) ====
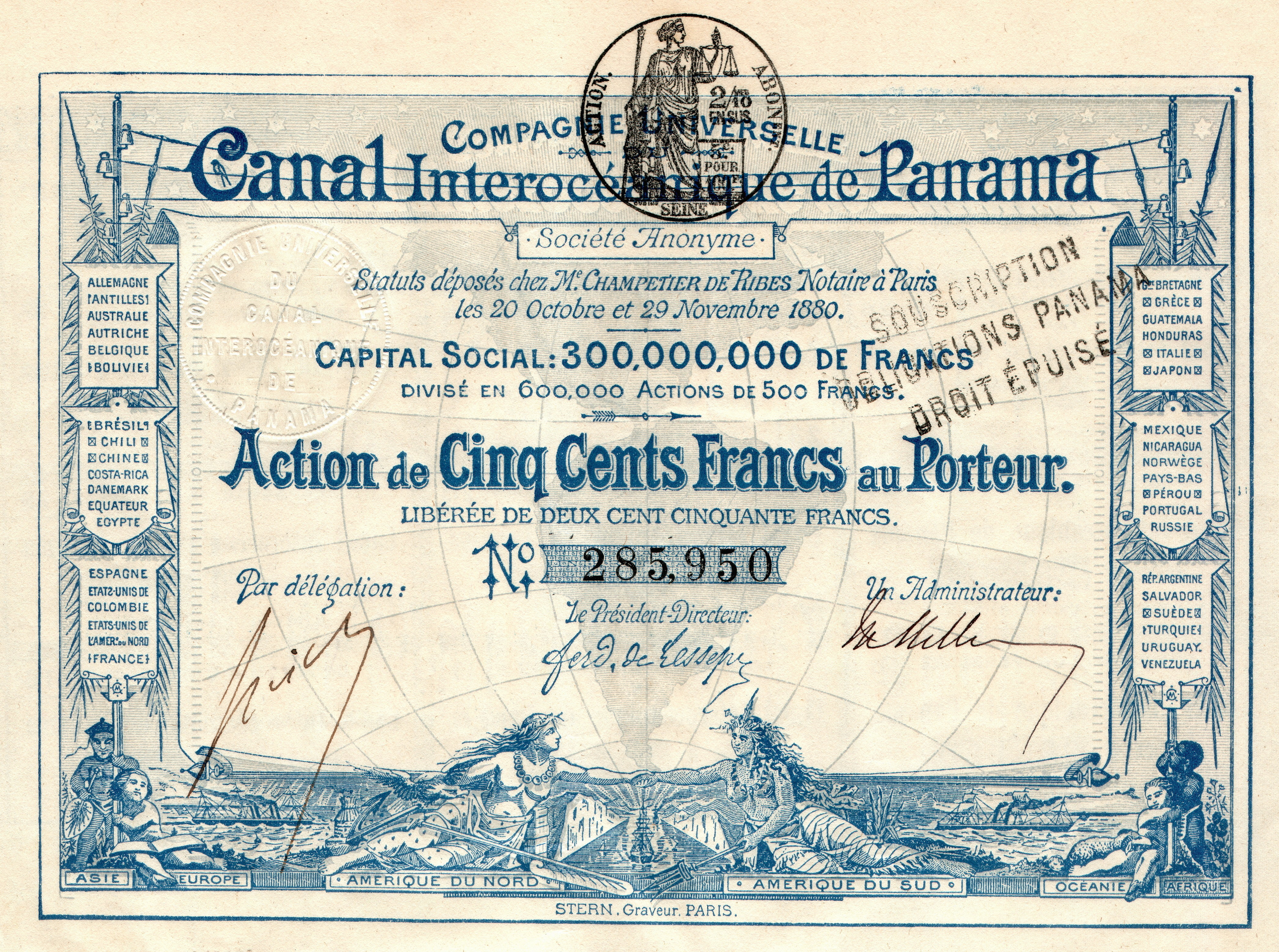
Share of the Compagnie Universelle du Canal Interocéanique de Panama, issued 29. November 1880 – signed by Ferdinand de Lesseps

Following the congress, the Compagnie Universelle du Canal Interocéanique de Panama, in charge of the construction, whose president was de Lesseps, acquired the Wyse Concession from the Société Civile.

Ferdinand de Lesseps was able to raise considerable funds in France as a result of the huge profits generated by his successful construction of the Suez Canal. He planned a sea-level canal, like Suez. The proposed canal would have a uniform depth of 9 meters (29.5 ft), a bottom width of 22 meters (72.2 ft) and a width at water level of about 27.5 meters (90.2 ft); the excavation estimate was 120,000,000 m^{3} (157,000,000 cu yd).

Despite his previous success, de Lesseps was not an engineer. The construction of the Suez Canal, essentially a ditch dug through a flat, sandy desert, presented few challenges. Although Central America's mountainous spine has a low point in Panama, it is still 110 meters (360.9 ft) above sea level at its lowest crossing point. The sea-level canal proposed by de Lesseps would require a great deal of excavation through a variety of unstable rock, rather than Suez's sand.

Less-obvious barriers were the rivers crossing the canal, particularly the Chagres, which flows strongly during the rainy season. Since the water would be a hazard to shipping if it drained into the canal, a sea-level canal would require the river's diversion. A dam was proposed at Gamboa to control flooding of the Chagres River, with channels to drain water away from the canal. However, the Gamboa dam was later found impracticable and the Chagres River problem was left unsolved.

=== French construction project (1881–1889) ===
==== Construction ====
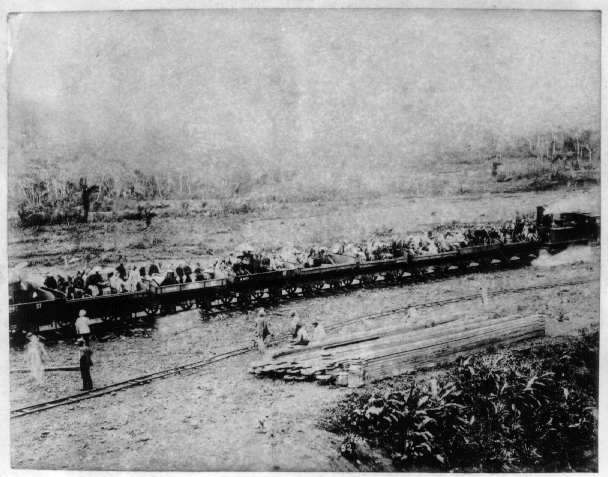
Construction of the canal

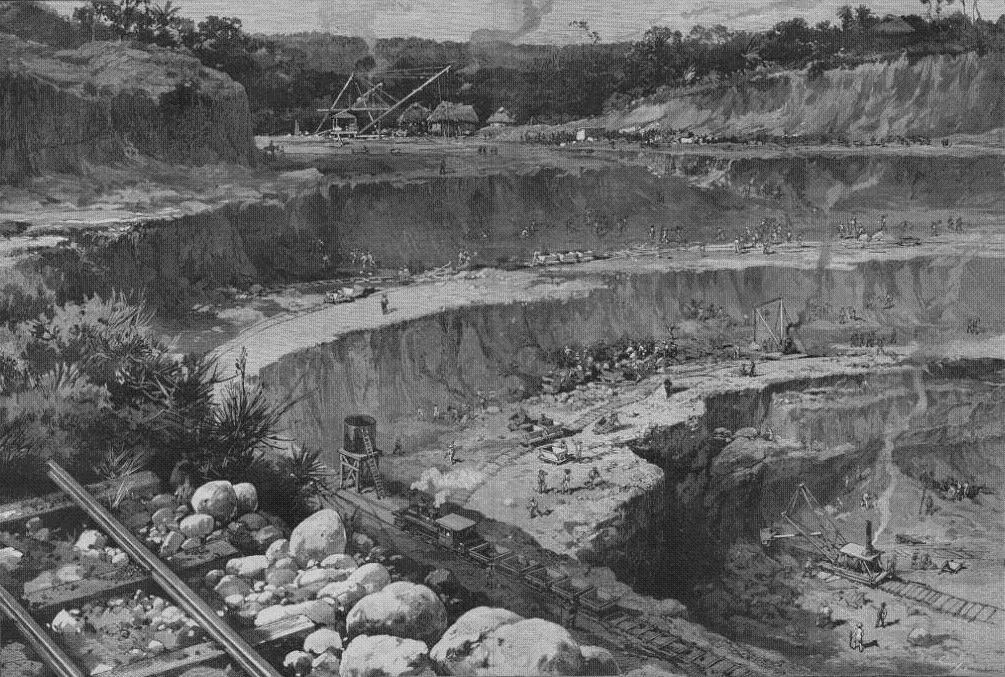
The Culebra Cut in 1885

Although the Panama Canal needed to be only 40 percent as long as the Suez Canal, it was much more of an engineering challenge because of the combination of tropical rain forests, debilitating climate, the need for canal locks, and the lack of any ancient route to follow.

Construction of the canal began on 1 January 1881, with digging at Culebra beginning on January 22. A large labor force was assembled, numbering about 40,000 in 1888 (nine-tenths of whom were afro-Caribbean workers from the West Indies). Although the project attracted good, well-paid French engineers, retaining them was difficult due to disease, principally malaria and yellow fever. The death toll from 1881 to 1889 was estimated at over 22,000, of whom as many as 5,000 were French citizens.

Engineering control was at first shared between Armand Reclus (as general agent of the canal company) and Gaston Blanchet (as head of the engineering subcontractor Couvreux, Hersent). In March 1882, Reclus suddenly resigned, and at the end of the year Couvreux, Hersent withdrew from its contract, leaving de Lesseps' company responsible for the work. In early 1883, the engineer Jules Dingler was appointed to head operations. He resigned in August 1885, following the deaths of all his family members from yellow fever. His replacement, Maurice Hutin, lasted only a month before he, too, resigned. Philippe Bunau-Varilla, who had arrived in 1884 as a junior engineer, found himself acting as chief engineer of the project. In early 1886, Bunau-Varilla was relieved by a new Director-General of Engineering, Léo Boyer, but decided to remain on as head of the major excavation at Culebra after convalescing from yellow fever. However, by May that year, Boyer was dead, another victim of yellow fever. He was temporarily replaced by his assistant, Nouailhac-Pioch, until an engineer by the name of Jacquier, the sixth Director General since 1883, was appointed in July 1886, a position he held until the crash of 1889.

De Lesseps visited the site only a few times, during the dry season which lasts only four months of the year. His men were unprepared for the rainy season, during which the Chagres River, where the canal started, became a raging torrent, rising up to 10 metres (33 ft). The dense jungle was alive with venomous snakes, insects, and spiders, but the worst challenges were yellow fever, malaria, and other tropical diseases, which killed thousands of workers; by 1884, the death rate was over 200 per month. Public health measures were ineffective because the role of the mosquito as a disease vector was then unknown. Conditions were downplayed in France to avoid recruitment problems, but the high mortality rate made it difficult to maintain an experienced workforce.

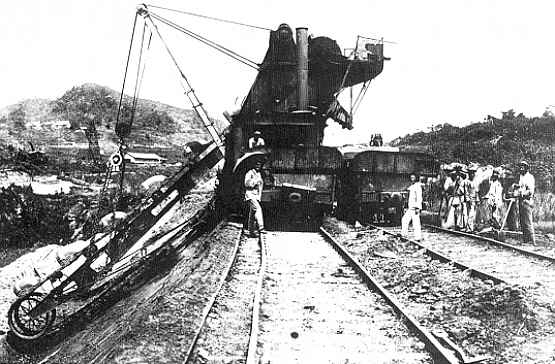
Excavator at work in Bas Obispo, 1886

Workers had to continually widen the main cut through the mountain at Culebra and reduce the angles of the slopes to minimize landslides into the canal. Steam shovels were used in the construction of the canal, purchased from Bay City Industrial Works, a business owned by William L. Clements in Bay City, Michigan. Bucket chain excavators manufactured by both Alphonse Couvreux and Wehyer & Richemond and Buette were also used. Other mechanical and electrical equipment was limited in capabilities, and steel equipment rusted rapidly in the rainy climate.

By 1886 it had become clear to many that a sea-level canal was impractical. The new director of engineering, Léo Boyer, wrote to his superiors his conviction that, within current time and cost limits, it would be impossible to construct a sea level canal. To soften the report, he recommended the design proposed by Bunau-Varilla of a temporary lake and lock canal that could later, after it was built and functioning, be gradually deepened to sea level. Nevertheless, de Lesseps continued to insist on a sea-level canal, finally accepting the necessity of a lock canal designed by Dingler and Eiffel only in October 1887, in a last-ditch attempt to save the project. By this time increasing mortality rates, as well as financial and engineering problems coupled with frequent floods and mudslides, indicated that the project was in serious trouble. Alexandre Eiffel was asked to design the locks.

In France, de Lesseps kept the investment and supply of workers flowing long after it was obvious that the targets were not being met, but eventually the money ran out. Work continued until May 15, 1889, when the company went bankrupt and the project was suspended. After eight years the canal was about two-fifths completed. About US$287,000,000 ($10.3 billion in 2025) had been spent, an estimated 22,000 men had died from disease and accidents, and the savings of 800,000 investors were lost.

==== Results ====
Although the French effort was effectively doomed to failure from the beginning due to disease and a lack of understanding of the engineering difficulties, it was not entirely futile. The old and new companies excavated 59,747,638 m^{3} (78,146,960 cu yd) of material, of which 14,255,890 m^{3} (18,646,000 cu yd) was taken from the Culebra Cut. The old company dredged a channel from Panama Bay to the port at Balboa, and the channel dredged on the Atlantic side (known as the French canal) was useful for bringing in sand and stone for the locks and spillway concrete at Gatún.

Detailed surveys and studies (particularly those carried out by the new canal company) and machinery, including railroad equipment and vehicles, aided the later American effort. The French lowered the summit of the Culebra Cut along the canal route by five meters (16 feet), from 64 to 59 metres (210 to 194 ft). An estimated 22,713,396 m^{3} (29,708,000 cu yd) of excavation, valued at about $25.4 million, and equipment and surveys valued at about $17.4 million were usable by the Americans.

=== Aftermath of the French project (1890-1900) ===
==== Panama scandals ====
The collapse of the Compagnie Universelle du Canal Interocéanique de Panama in 1889 resulted in a scandal in France. The antisemitic Edouard Drumont exploited the role of two Jewish speculators in the affair. The socialist politician Jean Jaurès was commissioned by the French parliament to conduct an inquiry which was completed in 1893, and found one hundred and four legislators to have been involved in corruption. Some of those deemed responsible were prosecuted, including Gustave Eiffel. De Lesseps and his son Charles were found guilty of misappropriation of funds and sentenced to five years' imprisonment. This sentence was later overturned, and the father, at age 88, was never imprisoned.

==== New Panama Canal Company ====
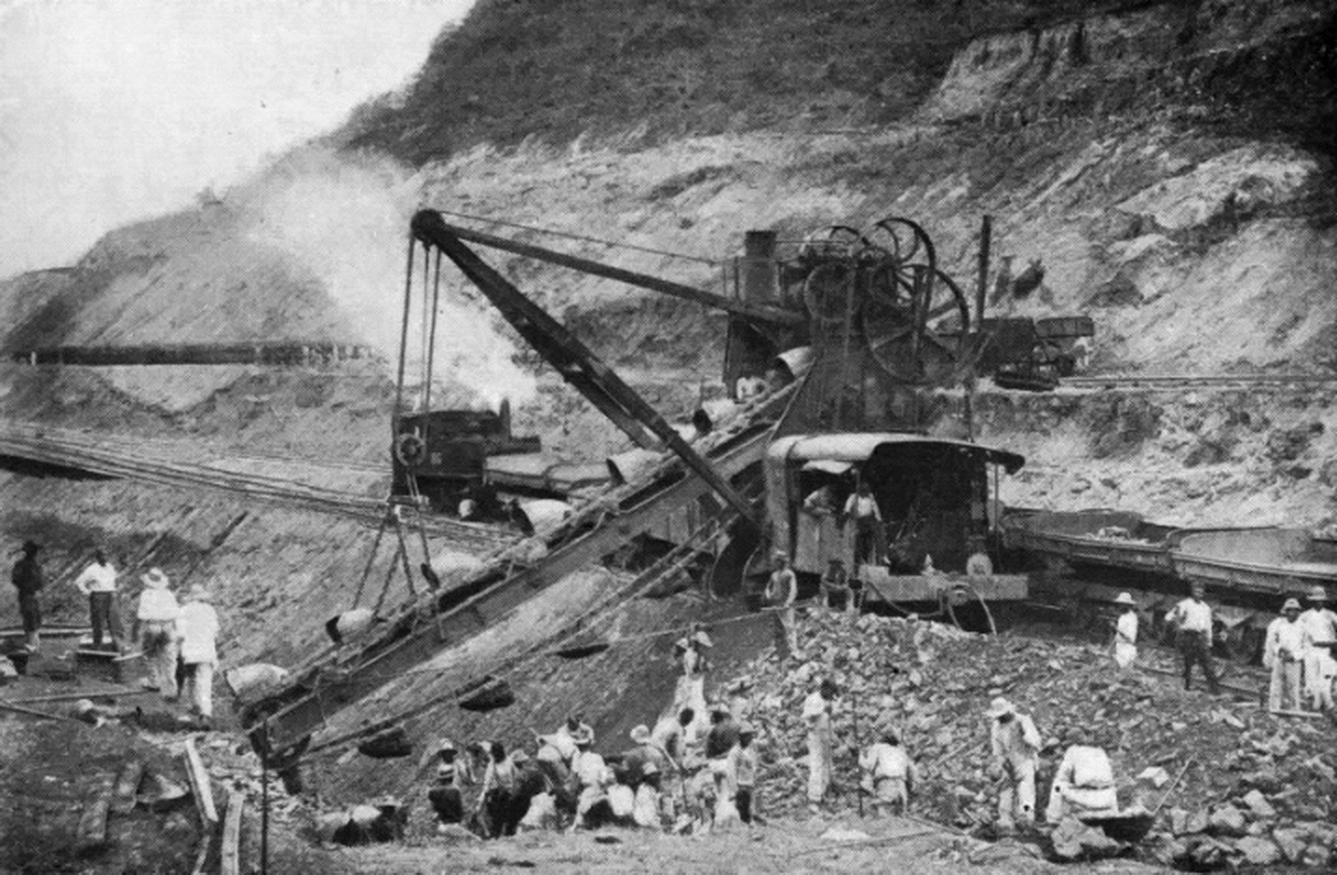
The Culebra Cut in 1896

It soon became clear that the only way to recoup expenses for the stockholders was to continue the project. The liquidators sent Bonaparte-Wyse back to Bogotá, where he was able to get the Wyse Concession extended. In 1894, a second French company, the Compagnie Nouvelle du Canal de Panama (New Panama Canal Company), was created to take over the project. Phillipe Bunau-Varilla was asked to act as chief engineer. To comply with the terms of the contract, work began immediately on the Culebra excavation. A minimal workforce of a few thousand people was employed primarily to comply with the terms of the Colombian Panama Canal concession, to run the Panama Railroad, and to maintain existing excavation and equipment in saleable condition: the most men employed on the new project was 3,600 (in 1896). The company sought a buyer for these assets, with an asking price of US$109,000,000 ($4.06 billion in 2025).

The Comité Technique, a high level technical committee, was formed by the Compagnie Nouvelle to review existing and current studies and come up with the best plan to complete the canal. On 16 November 1898, they presented a plan for a lock canal, which later served as inspiration for the canal eventually built by the Americans. The proposed canal would have two high level lakes to lift ships up and over the Continental Divide. Double locks would be 738 feet long and about 30 feet deep (225 m × 9 m); one chamber of each pair would be 82 feet (25 m) wide, the other 59 ft (18 m). There would be eight sets of locks, two at Bohio Soldado and two at Obispo on the Atlantic side; one at Paraiso, two at Pedro Miguel, and one at Miraflores on the Pacific. Artificial lakes would be formed by damming the Chagres River at Bohio and Alhajuela, providing both flood control and electric power.

Two lobbyists would become particularly active in later negotiations to sell the interests of the Compagnie Nouvelle. The American lawyer William Nelson Cromwell began looking after the interests of the company in 1894, after first acting for the related Panama Railroad. He would become deeply involved as a lobbyist in the American decisions to continue the canal in Panama, and to support Panamanian independence. The other was Philippe Bunau-Varilla, who, as one of the major subcontractors to the first French company, had been compelled by the receivers to take shares in the Compagnie Nouvelle.

== United States ==
=== Decision to build in Panama (1897-1904) ===
==== First U.S. initiatives toward a Central American canal ====
In the late nineteenth century, Americans widely accepted that any Central American canal would be built in Nicaragua, as recommended in 1876 by President Grant's Interoceanic Canal Commission. In 1887, a United States Army Corps of Engineers regiment surveyed canal possibilities in Nicaragua. Two years later, the Maritime Canal Company was organised to build a canal across Nicaragua, but collapsed financially in the panic of 1893. In 1897, President William McKinley (1897-1901) tasked a commission headed by Rear Admiral John Grimes Walker (the "Nicaraguan Canal Commission") to recommend the best route for a canal through Nicaragua. William Nelson Cromwell successfully lobbied the Government to consider alternatives to Nicaragua. As a result, McKinley in 1899 created the Isthmian Canal Commission (also known as the "second Walker Commission"), which was to give the final word. Cromwell wrote later that he considered the establishment of the second Walker Commission his proudest achievement, although he was unable to prevent the re-appointment of many commissioners.

In 1898, McKinley directed U.S. Secretary of State John Hay to negotiate a new treaty with the United Kingdom to replace the Clayton–Bulwer Treaty (1850), which remained a diplomatic stumbling block to U.S. investment in the building of a Central American canal.

==== Role of Theodore Roosevelt ====
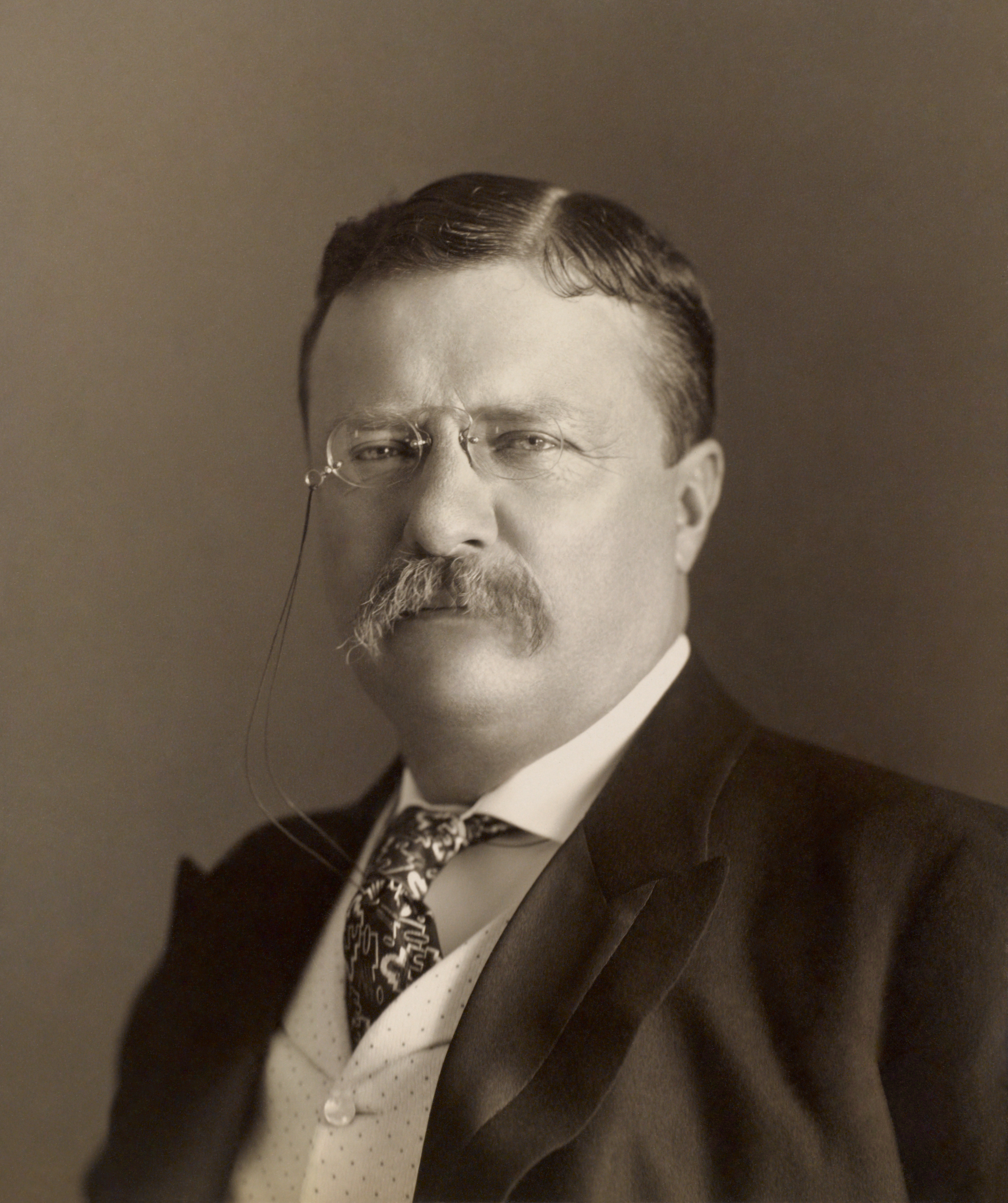
United States President Theodore Roosevelt (1901–1909), the driving force behind U.S. construction of the Panama Canal.

According to historian David McCullough, the building of the Panama Canal can be credited above all to U.S. President Theodore Roosevelt (1901–1909). It is true that the canal was constructed under three U.S. presidents – Roosevelt, Taft (1909–1913) and Wilson (1913–1921) – and that it is Taft who gave the project his most personal attention. Taft visited Panama five times as Roosevelt's secretary of war and twice as president. He hired John Stevens and later recommended Goethals as Stevens' replacement. Nonetheless, it was Roosevelt who made the critical decisions – the terms of the Hay–Pauncefote Treaty, the choice of the route through Panama, U.S. support for Secession of Panama from Colombia, his personal backing for William C. Gorgas against his detractors, and the choice of a lock-and-lake design over a sea-level canal. According to engineer George W. Goethals, who completed the canal, "the real builder of the Panama Canal was Theodore Roosevelt." Goethals wrote that the canal could not have been more Roosevelt's triumph "if he had personally lifted every shovelful of earth in its construction..." Just as the personal force of Ferdinand de Lesseps set the construction of the canal in motion, it was Roosevelt's personal drive which ensured that the canal was completed.

Roosevelt had been committed to building American naval power at least since his time lecturing at Harvard University in the 1880s. There he met and befriended Alfred Thayer Mahan, whose influential book The Influence of Sea Power upon History argued that naval power was decisive in determining the influence of nations. Roosevelt was an enthusiastic supporter of Mahan's views, and wrote to him privately that a Central American canal must be built. At that time, Roosevelt, like the vast majority of Americans, assumed that the canal would be built in Nicaragua. He became a vocal advocate for the building of a canal, writing letters and addressing business clubs on the subject. For him, a primary illustration of the need for a canal was the voyage of the USS Oregon at the start of the Spanish–American War. The battleship was ordered in March 1898 to proceed from its base on the west coast of the U.S. to join the North Atlantic Squadron and made an epic 14,000 nmi (26,000 km) voyage around the tip of South America to do so.

As Governor of New York, Roosevelt led opposition to the initial version of the Hay–Pauncefote Treaty (signed 1900), which would have provided for any Central American canal to be neutral. The resulting opposition led to a Senate amendment which proved unacceptable to the British, requiring the treaty to be renegotiated. After Roosevelt's accession to the Presidency (September 1901), he requested John Hay to continue in office as Secretary of State and to continue with treaty negotiations. The new version of the treaty, which was signed in November 1901, met Roosevelt's full approval, since it gave the U.S. the right to build and maintain a canal, to protect it as it saw fit, and did not require that the canal would be open to all in time of war.

==== Choice of Panama ====
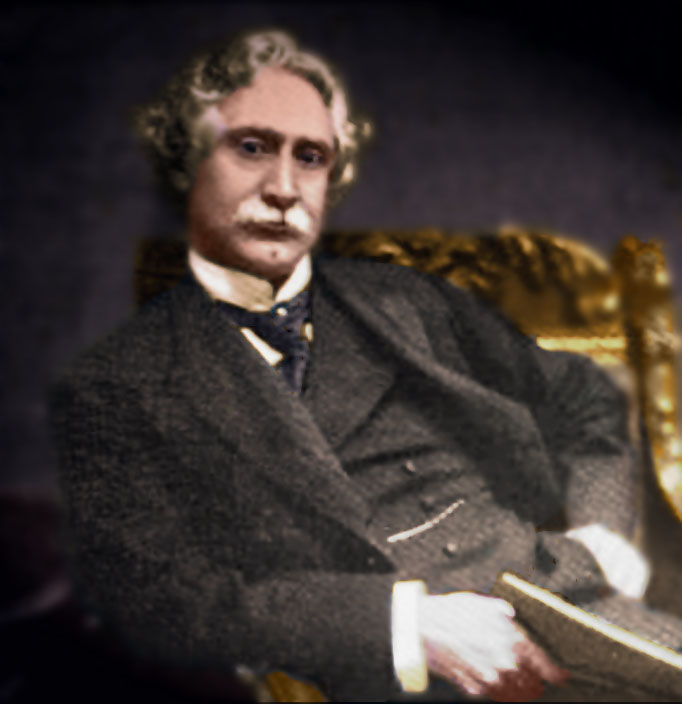
William Nelson Cromwell.

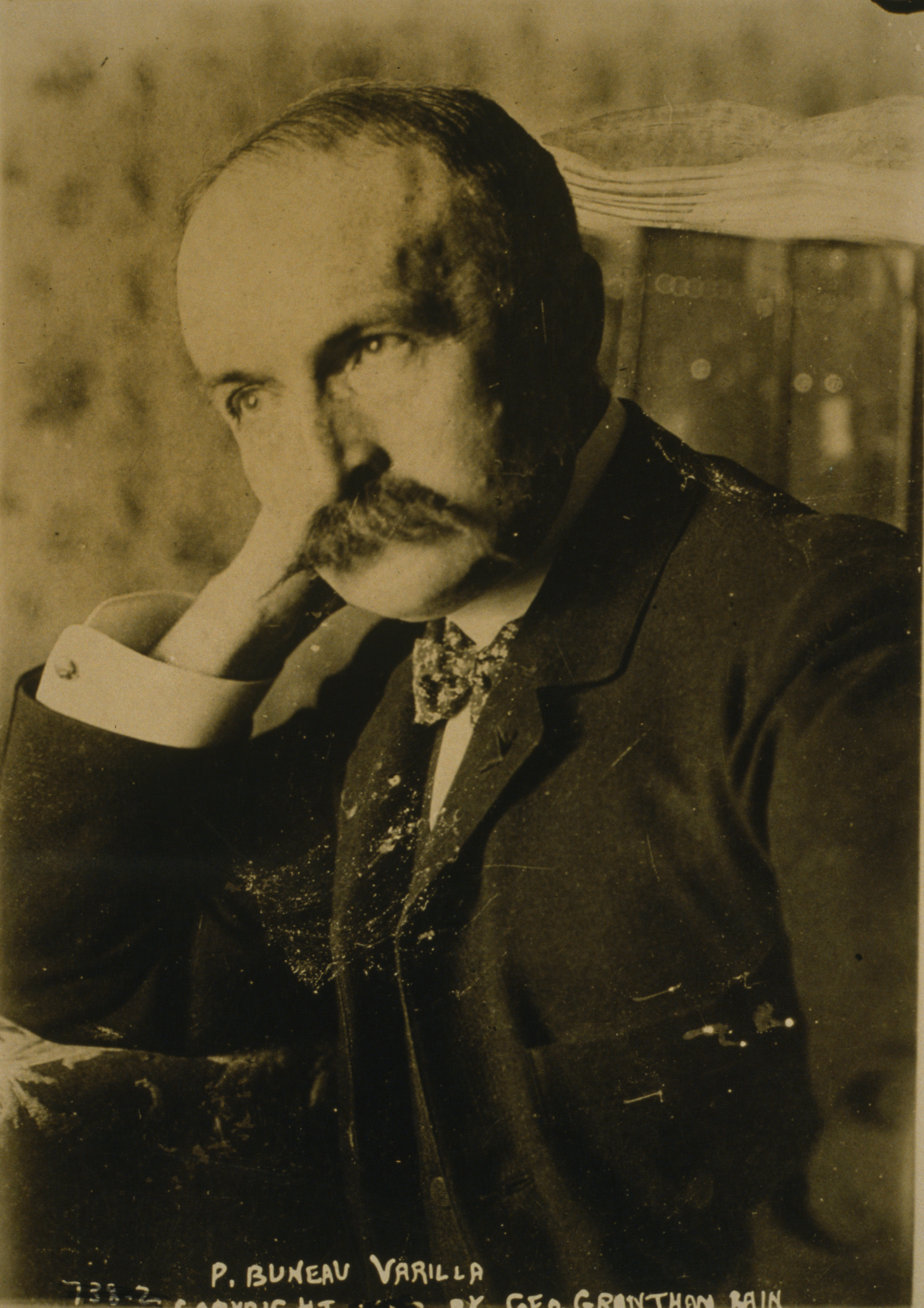
Philippe Bunau-Varilla.

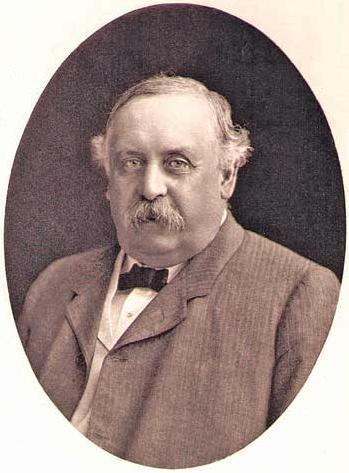
George S. Morison, the engineer who recommended building the canal in Panama.

Senator Mark Hanna, who championed in Congress the decision to build in Panama.

Following the establishment of the second Walker Commission in 1899, William Nelson Cromwell and Philippe Bunau-Varilla invested time and energy in cultivating relations with members of the commission, as well as influential politicians including Senator Mark Hanna. An invitation was issued by the Compagnie Nouvelle du Canal de Panama for the commission members to visit its offices in Paris. There they were shown maps, engineer reports and other technical documents relevant to the company's assets in Panama, as well as the plans for a lock canal. Following their inspection of possible canal sites in Panama and Nicaragua, the commission issued a confidential preliminary report on November 21, 1901. The recommendation was once again for Nicaragua, although the commission noted the strong argument for continuing the canal at Panama. The main ground for favoring Nicaragua was the price for purchasing rights to Panama from the Compagnie Nouvelle, which had been informally quoted at $109 million. This was considered excessive, as the commission estimated the value to the U.S: of the French concession (including excavations and the Panama Railroad) at only $40 million. However, George S. Morison, the most eminent engineer on the commission, wrote a minority report in favor of Panama on technical grounds.

William Randolph Hearst leaked the commission's report to Bunau-Varilla, who called an emergency meeting of the Compagnie Nouvelle stockholders in Paris in December 21. There Bunau-Varilla presented information he had obtained from a Chicago journalist that $40 million would be the maximum acceptable price. On January 4, 1902 the Compagnie Nouvelle formally notified the Walker Commission of their selling price, which was precisely $40 million.

Until 1901, President Roosevelt had been convinced that a canal through Nicaragua was the best route. On December 10, 1901 Morison wrote Roosevelt a letter giving the technical grounds for preferring the Panama route. In January 1902, Roosevelt called the members of the commission into his office individually and asked them to give their own personal evaluations of the best route. Following this, Roosevelt held a closed meeting with the entire commission in his office, where he made it clear that he wanted the French offer to be accepted. In late January, the commission issued the final version of its report, unanimously recommending Panama.

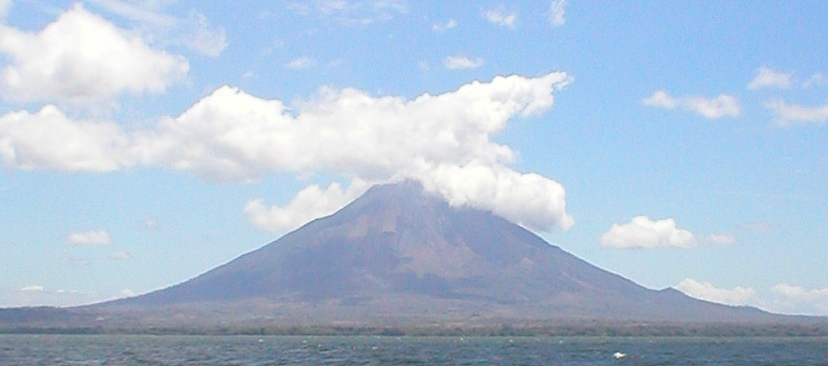
The volcano of Concepción, in Lake Nicaragua.

The proposal to purchase the French rights to Panama had a stormy passage through both houses of Congress. Senator John T. Morgan, a lifelong advocate of building a canal through Nicaragua, grilled the members of the Walker Committee on the reasons for their final change in recommendations. The choice of Panama was championed by Senator Mark Hanna. In a speech on June 5–6, Hanna referred to enormous maps of Central America he had placed, stretching from the ceiling of the Senate Chamber to the floor. The maps were prominently marked with red dots indicating active volcanoes and black dots marking extinct volcanoes. Whereas Nicaragua was marked with eight red dots and an almost continuous band of black dots, no dots appeared on the map of Panama. The tactic gained attention, since on May 2–8 the 1902 eruption of Mount Pelée on the island of Martinique had killed around 28,000 people. Hanna pointed out that his maps, which had been prepared several months previously, indicated Mount Pelée as extinct. Hanna noted many advantages of a Panama canal: it would be shorter than a Nicaraguan canal, would require less excavation, and had existing harbors at either end. The point was emphasized when Cromwell and Bunau-Varilla remembered that Nicaragua depicted volcanoes on its postage stamps, and ransacked Washington stamp dealers until they found enough to send to the entire Senate. The purchase of the French-held land for $40 million was eventually authorized by Congress in the June 28, 1902 Spooner Act.

==== Secession of Panama from Colombia ====
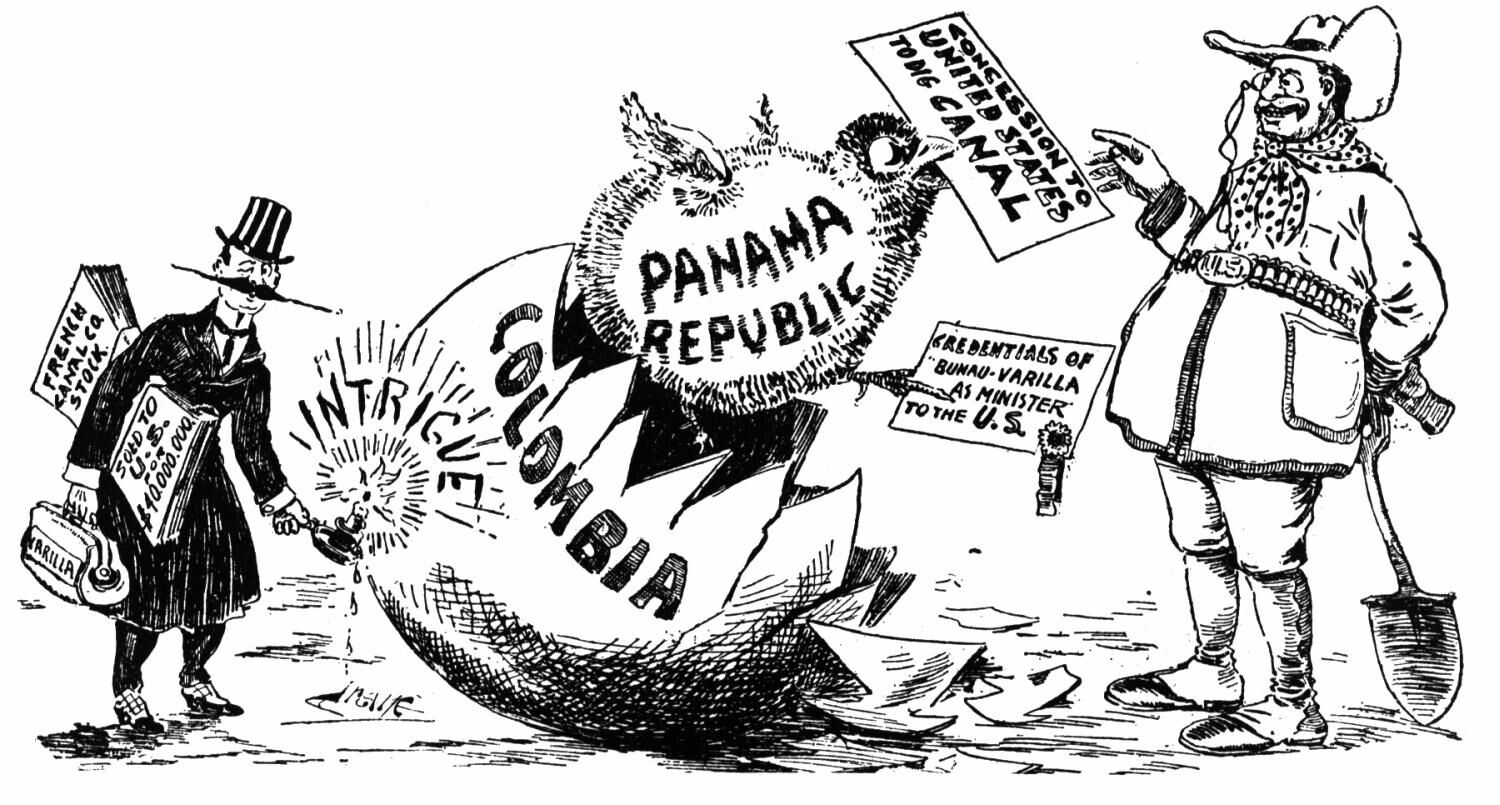
The US's intentions to influence the area (especially the Panama Canal construction and control) led to the secession of Panama from Colombia in 1903

Since Panama was then part of Colombia, United States Secretary of State John M. Hay began negotiating with that country to obtain the necessary rights. On 22 January 1903, the Hay–Herrán Treaty was signed by Hay and Colombian Chargé Tomás Herrán. For $10 million and an annual payment, it would have granted the United States a renewable lease in perpetuity from Colombia on the land proposed for the canal. The treaty was ratified by the US Senate on 14 March 1903. However, in Bogotá the treaty became unpopular because of perceptions of insufficient compensation and threat to sovereignty resulting from the lease in perpetuity. As a result, in August 1903, the Senate of Colombia unanimously rejected the treaty.

The intransigence of authorities in Bogotá frustrated business owners and landowners in Panama who hoped that an American resumption of the canal would bring prosperity to Panama. A secessionist movement quickly developed, headed by José Agustín Arango, and began working on a plan for the independence of Panama. The group was soon joined by Manuel Amador Guerrero, who would become the leader of the independence movement. Amador traveled to New York in September 1903 to determine how the United States might support the separation movement.

U.S. President Theodore Roosevelt had also become frustrated with the conflicting messages from Colombia, and decided to actively support the secession of Panama from Colombia, believing that the gratitude of Panamanian leaders would make them more amenable than the Colombians to working with the U.S. Amador was put in touch with Roosevelt by Bunau-Varilla. Roosevelt carefully avoided endorsing the revolt, but told Amador that if the Panamanian separatists revolted, the US would view this as a positive development and could be counted on to act accordingly. However, he warned Amador to avoid violence, since the American people would not recognize independence gained through bloodshed. Satisfied that his group had the tacit support of the U.S. government, Amador returned to Panama to set a plan in motion. Meanwhile, President Roosevelt ordered the warship USS Nashville under commander John Hubbard to proceed first to Jamaica, then to Panama.

However, the authorities in Bogotá had been notified that plans for a Panamanian revolt were afoot. The Colombian dispatched 500 members of the Tiradores Battalion to Colón on the Caribbean Sea coast, traveling aboard the cruiser Cartagena and merchant ship Alexander Bixio. These troops were under command of Generals Juan Tovar and Ramón Amaya, and were hastily assembled conscripts with little training.

The USS Nashville landed on 2 November 1903 off the coast of Colón, using as pretext the Mallarino–Bidlack Treaty of 1846, which required the U.S. to preserve the peaceful use of the Panama Railroad. The following day, the Colombian troops also made landfall at Colón. The conspirators had received word of the Colombian troops on their way, resulting in some desertions from the cause. However, Amador's wife María de la Ossa produced a plan to separate the Colombian generals from their troops with the aid of sympathetic management from the Panama Railroad. Amador contacted James Shaler (superintendent of the Panama Railroad) and Herbert G. Prescott (assistant superintendent) for their agreement and then gained approval from the other conspirators for the plan. Consequently, when Generals Juan Tovar and Ramón Amaya landed in Colón, they were met by Superintendent Shaler, who convinced the generals to go ahead to Panama City to see Governor Obaldía without their troops, while the railroad was gathering sufficient cars for the troops.

General Huertas, commander of the Colombia Battalion in Panama, ordered the arrest of Tovar and his aides on their arrival in Panama City. Upon hearing of the arrests, the tiradores in Colón, commanded by Col. Eliseo Torres, surrounded railroad workers and American troops garrisoned in the railroad yard. However, the tiradores were persuaded to leave Colón, under threat from the American gunboat USS Nashville, whose commander insisted that under the terms of the Mallarino–Bidlack Treaty he was not permitted to allow military use of the railroad. This is often cited as a classic example of the era of gunboat diplomacy.

The Colombian gunboat Bogotá fired shells upon Panama City the night of November 3, causing injuries and mortally wounding Mr. Wong Kong Yee of Hong Sang, China. He was the only casualty of independence. With the plan to neutralize the Colombian troops successfully concluded, Panama's independence was proclaimed by Amador and his fellow conspirators. The Municipal Council then met and confirmed the establishment of the Republic of Panama. The United States quickly recognized the new nation.

President Roosevelt famously stated, "I took the Isthmus, started the canal and then left Congress not to debate the canal, but to debate me." Several parties in the United States called this an act of war on Colombia: The New York Times described the support given by the United States to Bunau-Varilla as an "act of sordid conquest". The New York Evening Post called it a "vulgar and mercenary venture". The US maneuvers are often cited as the classic example of US gunboat diplomacy in Latin America, and the best illustration of what Roosevelt meant by the old African adage, "Speak softly and carry a big stick [and] you will go far."

In 1921, Colombia and the United States entered into the Thomson–Urrutia Treaty, in which the United States agreed to pay Colombia $25 million: $5 million upon ratification, and four $5 million annual payments, and grant Colombia special privileges in the Canal Zone. In return, Colombia recognized Panama as an independent nation.

==== Hay-Bunau-Varilla Treaty ====
On 6 November 1903, Philippe Bunau-Varilla, as Panama's ambassador to the United States, signed the Hay–Bunau-Varilla Treaty, granting rights to the United States to build and administer the Panama Canal Zone and its defenses. This treaty gave the US some rights to the canal "in perpetuity", but in article 22 limited other rights to a lease period of 99 years. Almost immediately, the treaty was condemned by many Panamanians as an infringement on their country's new national sovereignty. This would later become a contentious diplomatic issue among Colombia, Panama, and the United States. The leaders of the new government in breakaway Panama felt they had no choice but to accept the canal treaty due to a veiled threat presented by Bunau-Varilla: that failure to ratify the treaty would result in the end of U.S. support. Had the U.S. withdrawn its warships, the Colombian army would have returned to Panama and executed the members of the new government. However this threat was without merit. "The notion that Roosevelt would abandon Panama at this point, that he would leave the junta to the vengeance of Colombia, that he would now suddenly turn around and treat with Bogota, was not simply without foundation, but ridiculous to anyone the least familiar with the man or the prevailing temper in Washington. Nothing of the kind was ever even remotely contemplated at the White House or the State Department." The provisional government of Panama was thus pressured into signing the treaty, although it generously favored U.S. interests.

In 1904, the United States purchased the French equipment and excavations, including the Panama Railroad, for US$40 million, of which $30 million related to excavations completed, primarily in the Culebra Cut, valued at about $1.00 per cubic yard. The United States also paid the new country of Panama $10 million and a $250,000 payment each following year. The victorious Panamanians gave the United States control of the Panama Canal Zone on February 23, 1904, in accordance with the November 18, 1903 Hay–Bunau-Varilla Treaty.

=== United States construction of the Panama canal (1904–1914) ===
==== Beginning construction ====
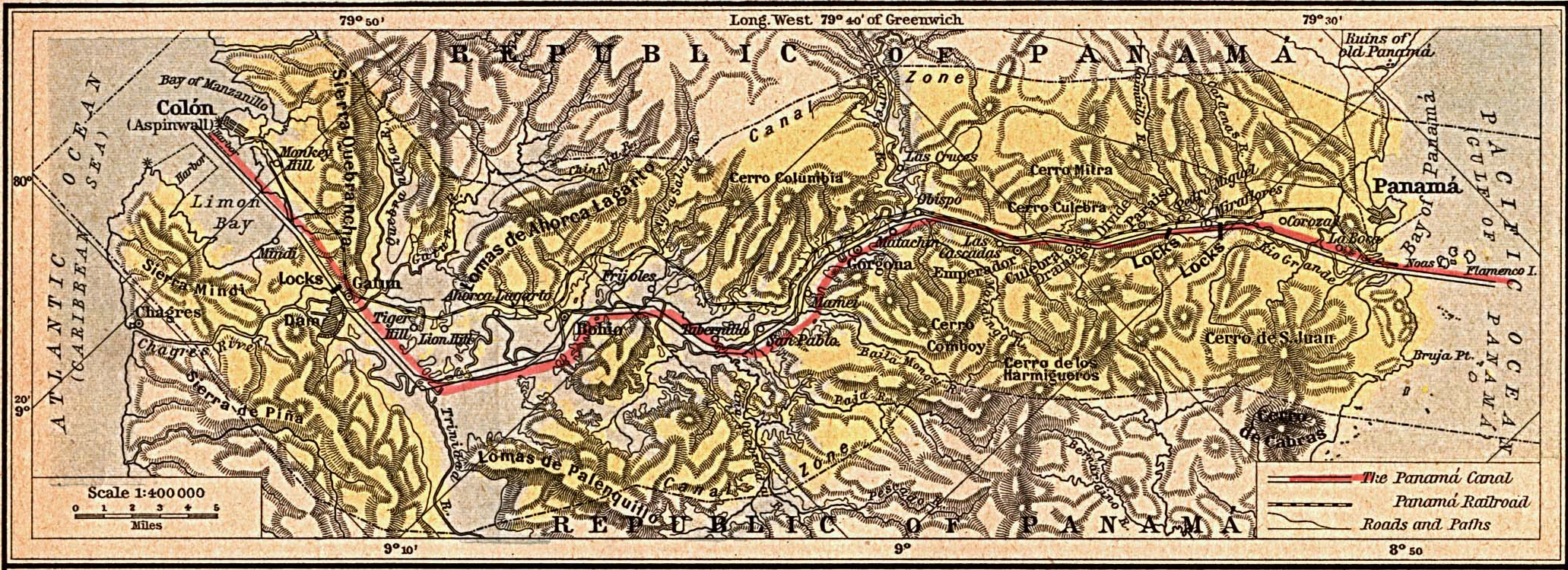
1923 elevation map of the canal, showing the region's topography

The United States formally took control of the French property connected to the canal on May 4, 1904, when Lieutenant Mark Brooke of the United States Army was presented with the keys during a small ceremony. The U.S. inherited from the French a depleted workforce and a vast jumble of buildings, infrastructure, and equipment, much of it in poor condition. A US government commission, the Isthmian Canal Commission (ICC), was established to oversee construction; it was given control of the Panama Canal Zone, over which the United States exercised sovereignty. The commission reported directly to Secretary of War William Howard Taft and was directed to avoid the inefficiency that had plagued the French 15 years earlier. On 6 May 1904, President Theodore Roosevelt appointed John Findley Wallace, formerly chief engineer and finally general manager of the Illinois Central Railroad, as chief engineer of the Panama Canal Project.

The first step taken by the US government was to place all the canal workers under the new administration. The operation was maintained at minimum strength to comply with the canal concession and keep the machinery in working order. The US inherited a small workforce and an assortment of buildings, infrastructure and equipment, much of which had been neglected for fifteen years in the humid jungle environment. There were no facilities in place for a large workforce, and the infrastructure was crumbling.

Cataloguing assets was a large job; it took many weeks to card-index available equipment. About 2,150 buildings had been acquired, many of which were uninhabitable; housing was an early problem, and the Panama Railway was in a state of decay. However, much equipment (such as locomotives, dredges and other floating equipment) was still serviceable.

Although chief engineer John Findley Wallace was pressured to resume construction, red tape from Washington stifled his efforts to obtain heavy equipment and caused friction between Wallace and the ICC. Overwhelmed by the disease-plagued country and forced to use often dilapidated French infrastructure and equipment, as well as being frustrated by the overly bureaucratic ICC, chief engineer Wallace resigned abruptly in June 1905.

==== John Frank Stevens ====
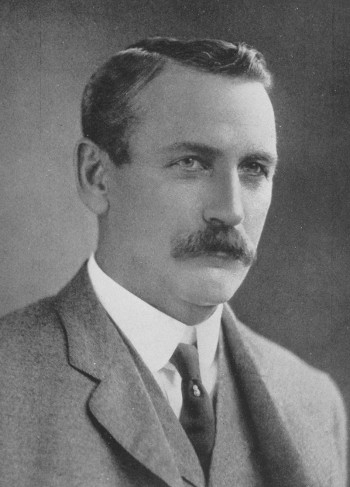
John Frank Stevens, Chief engineer (1905-07)

The ICC brought on a new chairman, Theodore P. Shonts, and a new chief engineer was appointed, John Frank Stevens, a self-educated engineer who had built the Great Northern Railroad. Stevens arrived on July 28, 1905. He quickly realized that serious investment in infrastructure was necessary and determined to upgrade the railway, improve sanitation in Panama City and Colón, renovate the old French buildings and build hundreds of new ones for housing. He then began the difficult task of recruiting the large labor force required for construction. Stevens' approach was to press ahead first and obtain approval later. He improved drilling and dirt-removal equipment at the Culebra Cut for greater efficiency, revising the inadequate provisions in place for soil disposal. Stevens was not a member of the ICC; he increasingly viewed its bureaucracy as a serious hindrance, bypassing the commission and sending requests and demands directly to the Roosevelt administration in Washington, DC.

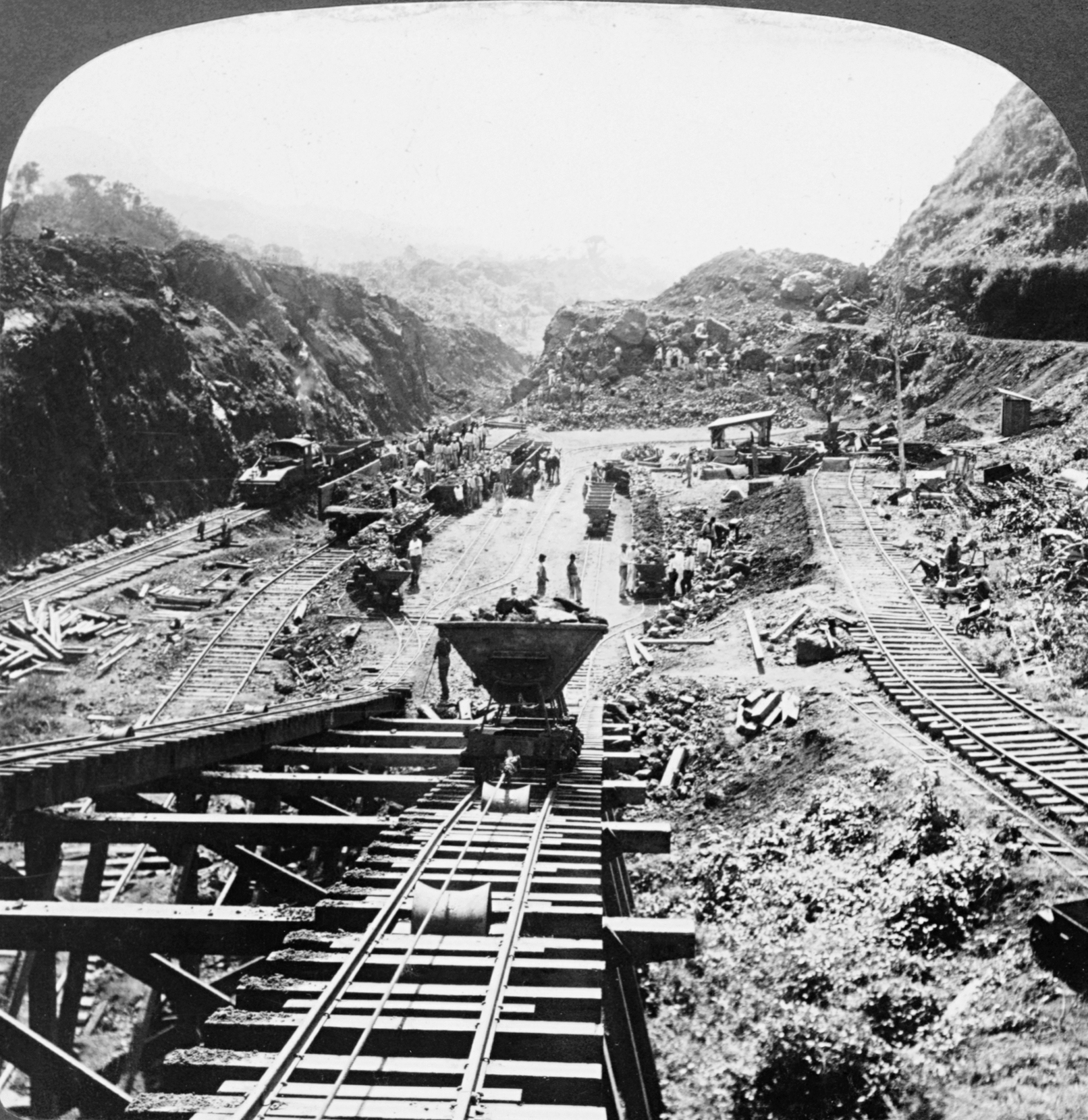
Construction work on the Culebra Cut, 1907

One of Stevens' first achievements in Panama was in building and rebuilding the housing, cafeterias, hotels, water systems, repair shops, warehouses, and other infrastructure needed by the thousands of incoming workers. Stevens began the recruitment effort to entice thousands of workers from the United States and other areas to come to the Canal Zone to work. Workers from the Caribbean, especially Barbados—called "Afro-Panamanians"—came in large numbers and many settled permanently. Stevens tried to provide accommodation in which the workers could work and live in reasonable safety and comfort. He also re-established and enlarged the railway, which was to prove crucial in transporting millions of tons of soil from the cut through the mountains to the dam across the Chagres River.

Besides healthier and far better living conditions for the workers, another benefit given to American citizens working on the Canal was a medal for two years of service. Additional bars were added for each two-year period after that. Designed by Victor D. Brenner and featuring the then-current president they were popularly known as The Roosevelt Medal. A total of 7189 were ultimately issued, with a few people receiving as many as four bars. Certificates are available today.

==== Health challenges ====
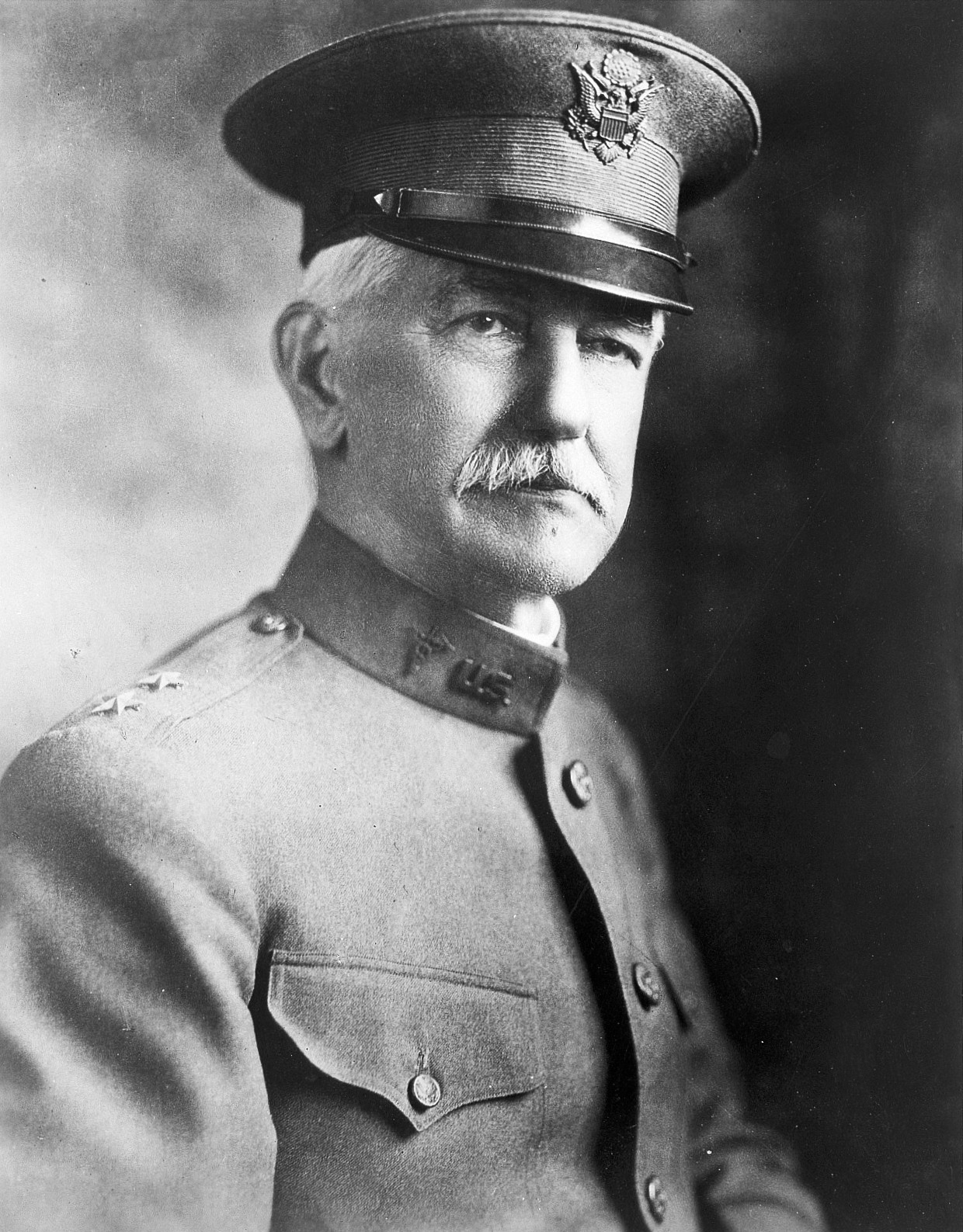
Sanitation officer William C. Gorgas

Colonel William C. Gorgas was appointed chief sanitation officer of the canal construction project in 1904, with the task of controlling infectious diseases (including yellow fever and malaria), which had led to thousands of deaths during French construction efforts. Gorgas concentrated on eradicating mosquitoes in the canal zone, extending the approach he had adopted in 1898 to successfully eliminate yellow fever in Havana. In that campaign, he had concentrated on draining stagnant water where the Aedes aegypti mosquito bred and quarantining yellow fever patients in screened service rooms. As a consequence, cases in Havana had plunged from 784 to zero within a year. His approach was based on the work of Cuban epidemiologist Carlos Finlay and American pathologist Walter Reed, which had shown that yellow fever was spread by the vector mosquito Aedes aegypti. The approach was controversial, since it contradicted traditional notions that yellow fever was caused by contact with filth.

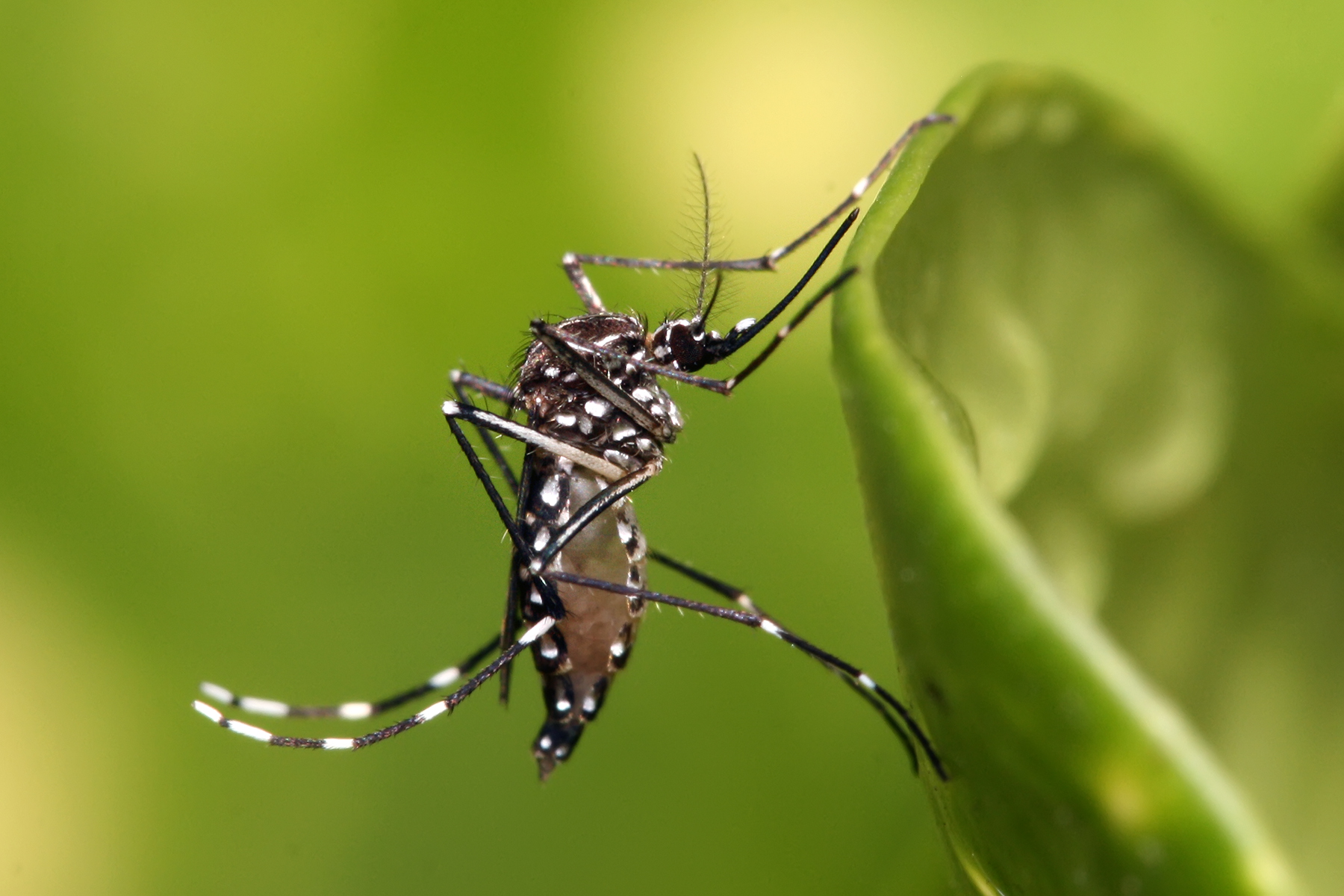
Aedes aegypti, the mosquito vector of yellow fever.

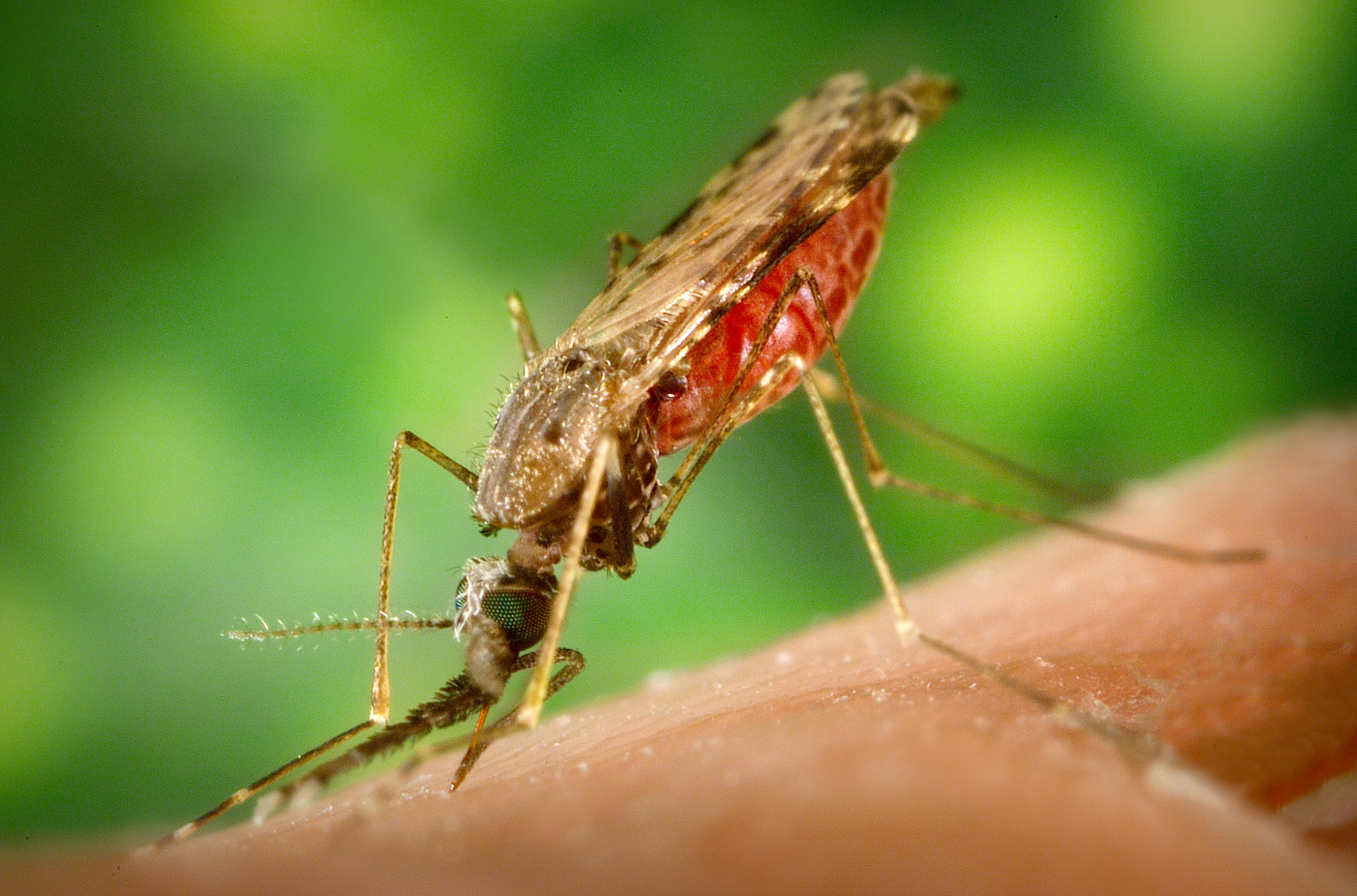
Anopheles albimanus, the mosquito vector of the malaria parasite.

The research of Scottish physician Sir Ronald Ross had similarly shown that malaria was spread by the Anopheles mosquito, contrary to traditional ideas that it resulted from noxious vapors. In his campaign against malaria and yellow fever, Gorgas therefore concentrated on eliminating contact with mosquitoes. He invested in extensive sanitation projects, including fumigation of buildings, spraying of insect-breeding areas with oil and larvicide, installation of mosquito netting and window screens, and inspection of every building to ensure sources of stagnant water were removed. He also constructed city water systems to replace the traditional Panamanian custom of keeping containers of water in houses. Despite opposition from the canal commission (one member said his ideas were barmy), Gorgas persisted, and when Stevens arrived, he threw his weight behind the project.

Nonetheless, Gorgas continued to face opposition because of the cost- and manpower-intensive nature of the eradication work, as well as entrenched ideas that mosquitoes were irrelevant to disease spread. Canal commission chairman Shonts directly requested President Roosevelt to remove Gorgas from the project because of his costly obsession with mosquitoes. Roosevelt asked advice from two leading physicians in the U.S. He was told that he had a choice between Shonts and Gorgas, and that he would get his canal if he supported Gorgas. Thereafter, Roosevelt gave Gorgas his full backing.

After two years of extensive work, the mosquito-spread diseases were nearly eliminated. Despite the monumental effort, about 5,600 workers died from disease and accidents during the US construction phase of the canal. Of these, the great majority were West Indian laborers, particularly those from Barbados. The number of Americans who died was about 350.

==== Sea-level or lock-and-lake? ====
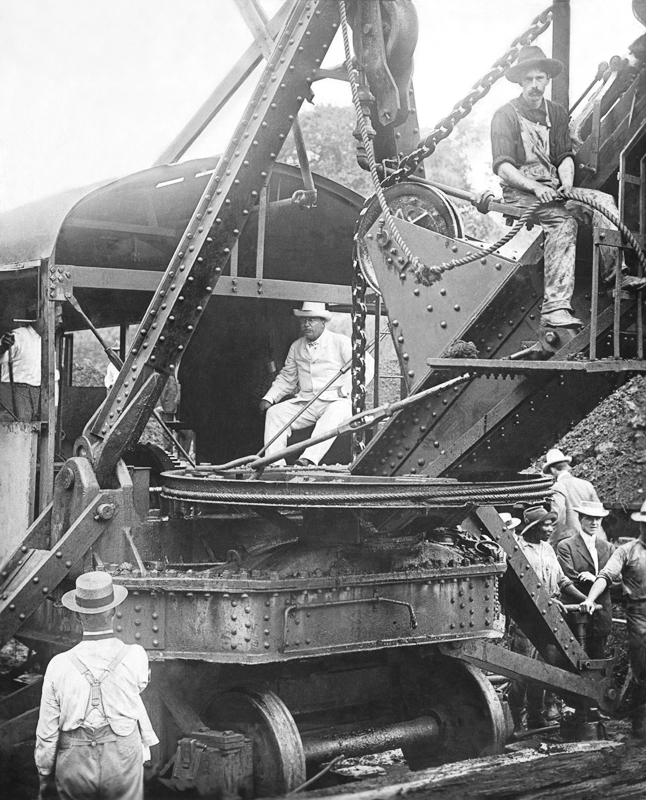
President Theodore Roosevelt sitting on a Bucyrus steam shovel at Culebra Cut, 1906

No decision had been made about whether the canal should be a lock or a sea-level one; the ongoing excavation would be useful in either case. In late 1905, President Roosevelt commissioned a team of engineers, who were sent to Panama to investigate the relative merits of both types in cost and time. In January 1906 the panel, in a majority of eight to five, recommended to President Roosevelt a sea-level canal, as had been attempted by the French. But in 1906 Stevens, who had seen the Chagres River in full flood, was summoned to Washington; he declared a sea-level approach to be "an entirely untenable proposition". He argued in favor of a canal using a lock system to raise and lower ships from a large reservoir 85 ft (26 m) above sea level. This would create both the largest dam (Gatun Dam) and the largest human-made lake (Gatun Lake) in the world at that time. The water to refill the locks would be taken from Gatun Lake by opening and closing enormous gates and valves and letting gravity propel the water from the lake. Gatun Lake would connect to the Pacific through the mountains at the Culebra Cut. The plan was essentially similar to that proposed by Adolphe Godin de Lépinay at the Congrès International d'Etudes du Canal Interocéanique in 1879. Unlike that occasion, Stevens successfully convinced Roosevelt and Congress of the necessity and feasibility of this alternative scheme. In November 1906 Roosevelt visited Panama to inspect the canal's progress, the first trip outside the United States by a sitting president.

==== Goethals replaces Stevens as chief engineer ====
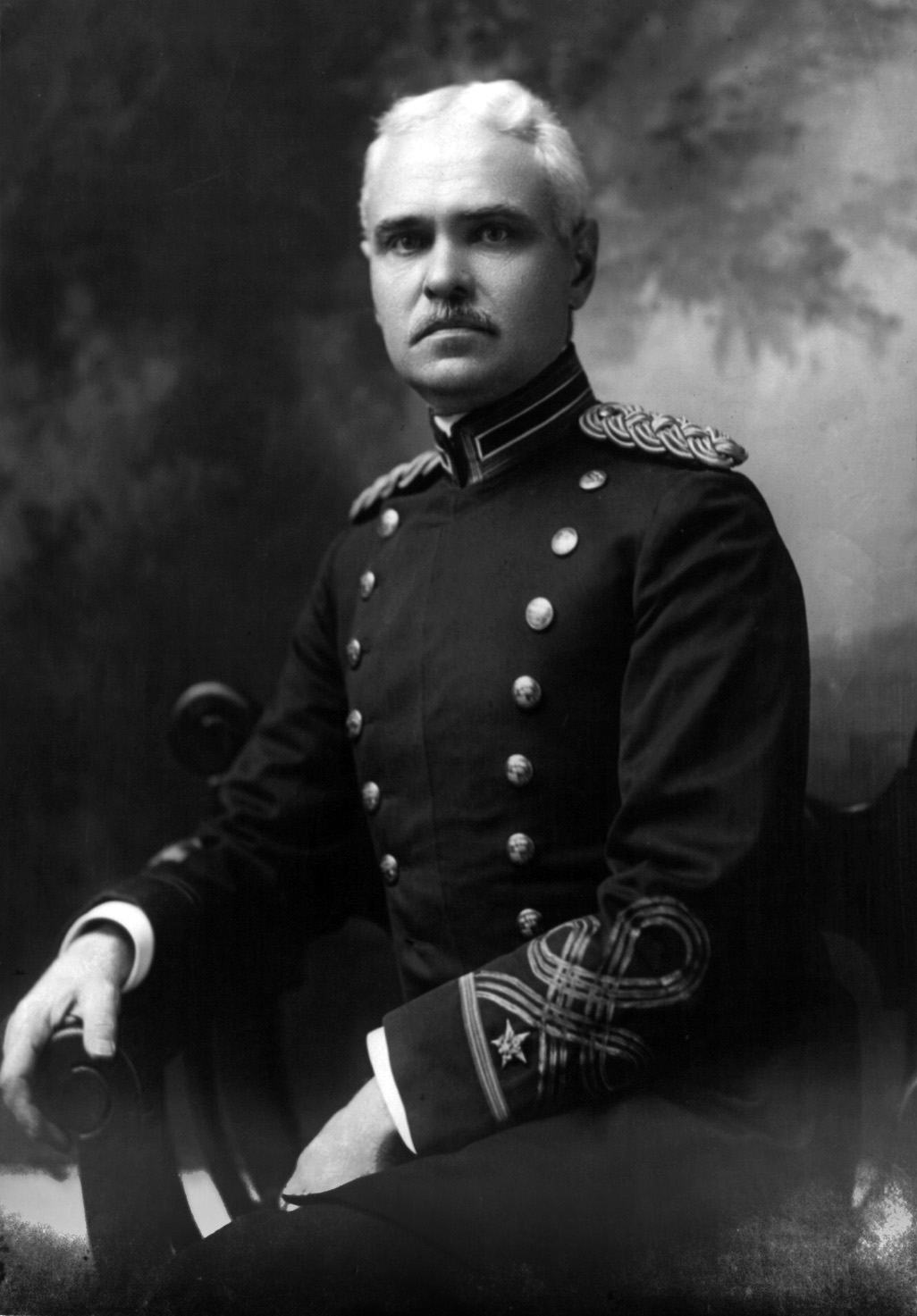
Colonel (later General) George Washington Goethals, who completed the canal

In 1907, Stevens resigned as chief engineer. His replacement, appointed by President Theodore Roosevelt, was US Army Major George Washington Goethals of the US Army Corps of Engineers. Soon to be promoted to lieutenant colonel and later to general, he was a strong, West Point-trained leader and civil engineer with experience in canals (unlike Stevens). Goethals directed the work in Panama to a successful conclusion in 1914, two years ahead of the target date of 10 June 1916.

Goethals divided the engineering and excavation work into three divisions: Atlantic, Central, and Pacific. The Atlantic Division, under Major William L. Sibert, was responsible for construction of the massive breakwater at the entrance to Bahía Limón, the Gatun locks, and their 3 1/2-mile (5.6 km) approach channel, and the immense Gatun Dam. The Pacific Division, under Sydney B. Williamson (the only civilian member of this high-level team), was similarly responsible for the Pacific 3-mile (4.8 km) breakwater in Panama Bay, the approach channel to the locks, and the Miraflores and Pedro Miguel locks and their associated dams and reservoirs.

The Central Division, under Major David du Bose Gaillard of the United States Army Corps of Engineers, was assigned one of the most difficult parts: excavating the Culebra Cut through the continental divide to connect Gatun Lake to the Pacific Panama Canal locks.

==== Workforce ====
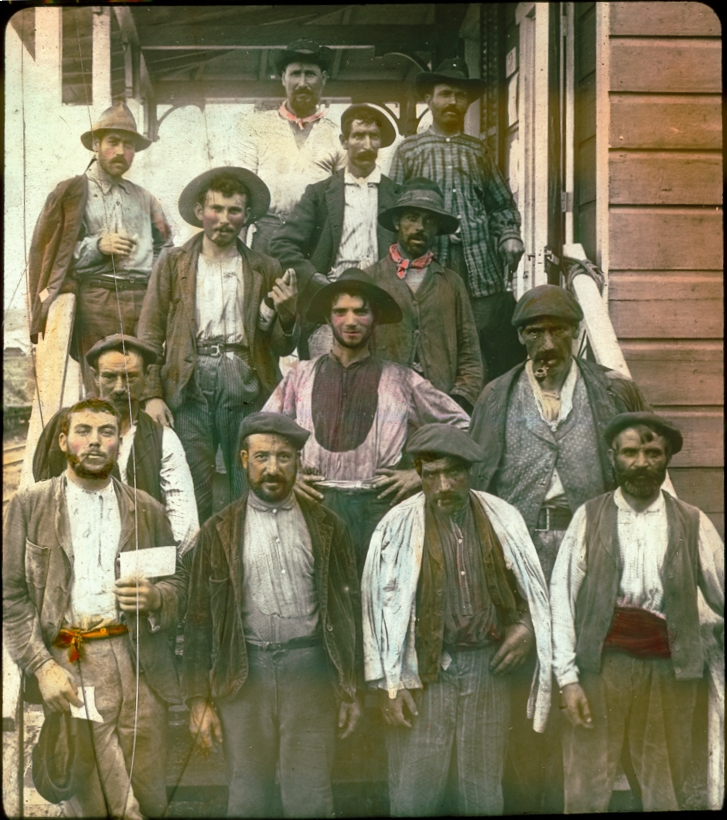
Spanish laborers working on the Panama Canal in early 1900s

The US relied on a stratified workforce to build the canal. High-level engineering jobs, clerical positions, skilled labor and jobs in supporting industries were generally reserved for Americans, with manual labor primarily by cheap immigrant labor. These jobs were initially filled by Europeans, primarily from Spain, Italy and Greece, many of whom were radical and militant due to political turmoil in Europe. The US then decided to recruit primarily from the British and French West Indies, and these workers provided most of the manual labor on the canal.

==== Living conditions ====
The Canal Zone originally had minimal facilities for entertainment and relaxation for the canal workers apart from saloons; as a result, alcohol abuse was a great problem. The inhospitable conditions resulted in many American workers returning home each year.

A program of improvements was implemented. Clubhouses were built, managed by the YMCA, with billiard, assembly and reading rooms, bowling alleys, darkrooms for camera clubs, gymnastic equipment, ice cream parlors, soda fountains and a circulating library. Member dues were ten dollars a year, with the remaining upkeep (about $7,000 at the larger clubhouses) paid by the ICC. The commission built baseball fields and arranged rail transportation to games; a competitive league soon developed. Semi-monthly Saturday-night dances were held at the Hotel Tivoli, which had a spacious ballroom.

These measures influenced life in the Canal Zone; alcohol abuse fell, with saloon business declining by 60 percent. The number of workers leaving the project each year dropped significantly.

==== US construction ====
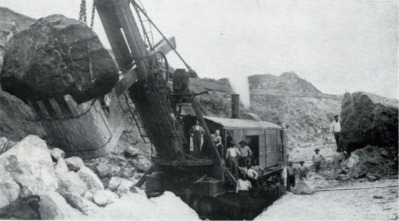
A Marion steam shovel excavating the Panama Canal in 1908

The work done thus far was preparation, rather than construction. By the time Goethals took over, the construction infrastructure had been created or overhauled and expanded from the French effort and he was soon able to begin construction in earnest.

Goethals divided the project into three divisions: Atlantic, Central and Pacific. The Atlantic Division, under Major William L. Sibert, was responsible for construction of the breakwater at the entrance to Bahía Limón, the Gatún locks and their 5.6 km (3.5 mi) approach channel, and the Gatun Dam. The Pacific Division (under Sydney B. Williamson, the only civilian division head) was responsible for the Pacific entrance to the canal, including a 4.8 km (3.0 mi) breakwater in Panama Bay, the approach channel, and the Miraflores and Pedro Miguel locks and their associated dams. The Central Division, under Major David du Bose Gaillard, was responsible for everything in between. It had arguably the project's greatest challenge: excavating the Culebra Cut (known as the Gaillard Cut from 1915 to 2000), which involved cutting 8 miles (13 km) across the continental divide down to 12 meters (39 feet) above sea level.

By August 1907, 765,000 m^{3} (1,001,000 yd^{3}) per month was being excavated; this set a record for the rainy season; soon afterwards this doubled, before increasing again. At the peak of production, 2,300,000 m^{3} (3,000,000 yd^{3}) was being excavated per month (the equivalent amount of spoil from the Channel Tunnel every 3½ months).

==== Culebra Cut ====
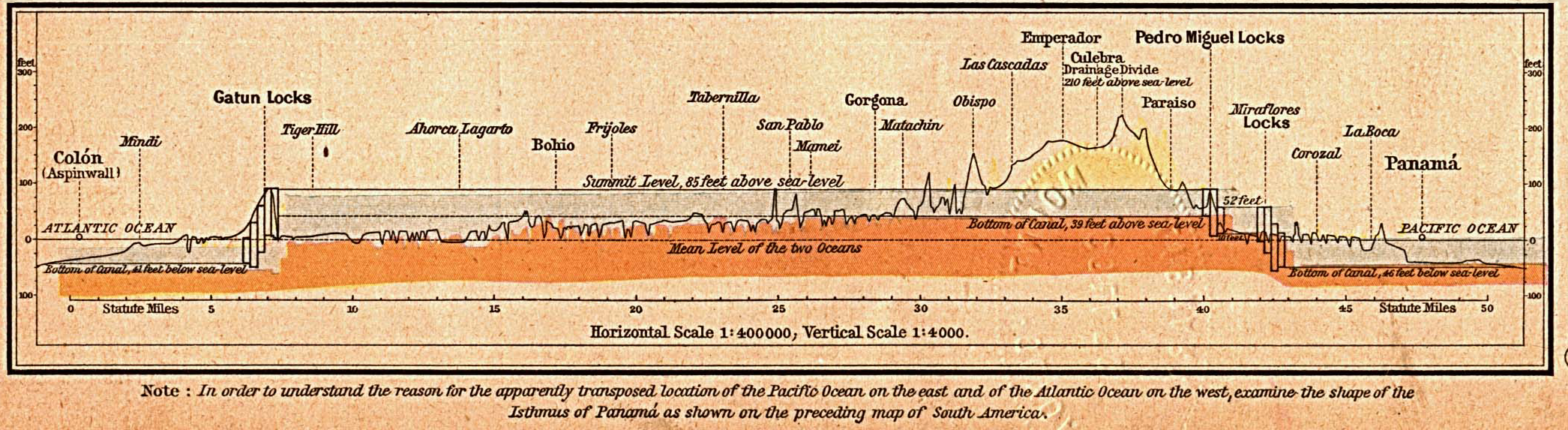
1923 diagram illustrating the elevations through which the canal cuts across the isthmus

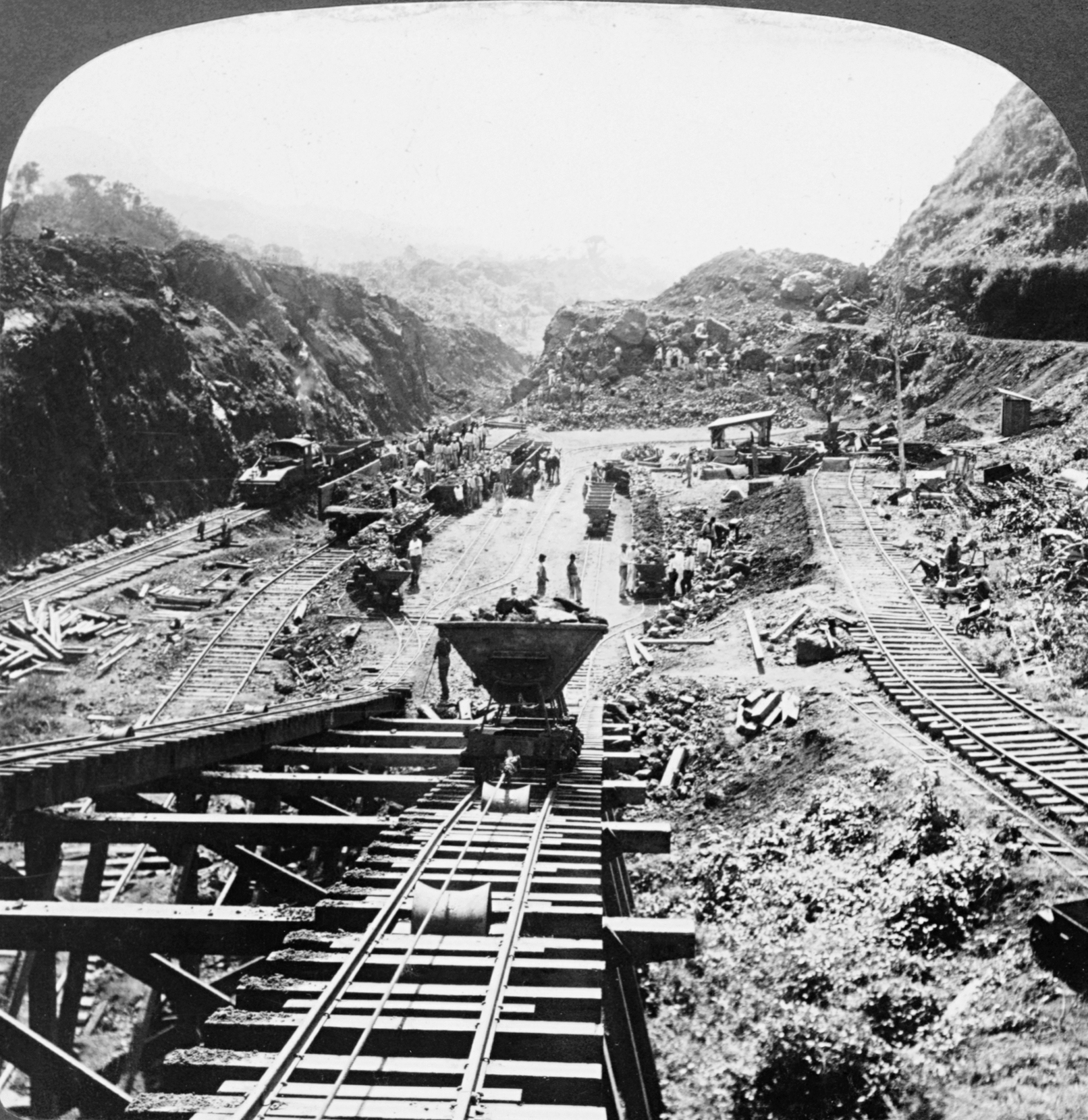
The Culebra Cut in 1907

One of the greatest barriers to a canal was the continental divide, which originally rose to 110 metres (360.9 ft) above sea level at its highest point. The effort to cut through this barrier of rock was one of the greatest challenges faced by the project.

Goethals arrived at the canal with Major David du Bose Gaillard of the US Army Corps of Engineers. Gaillard was placed in charge of the canal's Central Division, which stretched from the Pedro Miguel locks to the Gatun Dam, and dedicated himself to getting the Culebra Cut (as it was then known) excavated.

The scale of the work was massive. 6 thousand men worked in the cut, drilling holes in which a total of 27,000 t (60,000,000 lb) of dynamite were placed to break up the rock (which was then removed by as many as 160 trains per day). Landslides were frequent, due to the oxidation and weakening of the rock's underlying iron strata. Although the scale of the job and the frequent, unpredictable slides generated chaos, Gaillard provided quiet, clear-sighted leadership.

On May 26, 1913, Bucyrus steam shovels made a passage through the Culebra Cut at the level of the canal bottom. The French effort had reduced the summit to 59 metres (193.6 ft) over a relatively narrow width; the Americans had lowered this to 12 metres (39.4 ft) above sea level over a greater width, and had excavated over 76,000,000 m^{3} (99,000,000 cu yd) of material. About 23,000,000 m^{3} (30,000,000 cu yd) of this material was in addition to the planned excavation, due to landslides. Dry excavation ended on September 10, 1913; a January slide had added 1,500,000 m^{3} (2,000,000 cu yd) of earth, but it was decided that this loose material would be removed by dredging when the cut was flooded.

==== Dams ====
Two artificial lakes are key parts of the canal: Gatun and Miraflores Lakes. Four dams were constructed to create them. Two small dams at Miraflores impound Miraflores Lake, and a dam at Pedro Miguel encloses the south end of the Culebra Cut (essentially an arm of Lake Gatun). The Gatun Dam is the main dam blocking the original course of the Chagres River, creating Gatun Lake.

The Miraflores dams are an 825-metre (2,707 ft) earth dam connecting the Miraflores Locks in the west and a 150-metre (492 ft) concrete spillway dam east of the locks. The concrete dam has eight floodgates, similar to those on the Gatun spillway. The earthen, 430-metre (1,411 ft) Pedro Miguel dam extends from a hill in the west to the lock. Its face is protected by rock riprap at the water level. The largest and most challenging of the dams is the Gatun Dam. This earthen dam, 640 metres (2,100 ft) thick at the base and 2,300 metres (7,546 ft) long along the top, was the largest of its kind in the world when the canal opened.

==== Locks ====
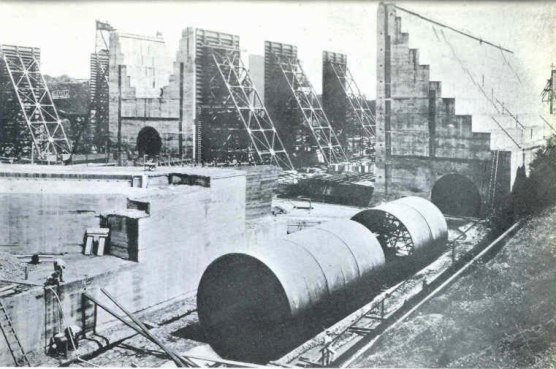
The Panama Canal locks under construction in 1910

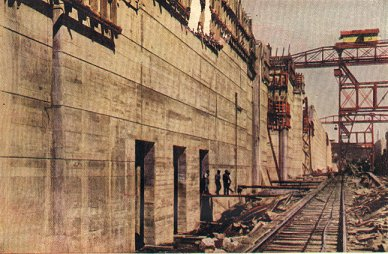
Pedro Miguel Locks under construction during the early 1910s, looking north, showing the center wall and intakes

The construction of a canal with locks required the excavation of more than 17 million cu yd (13 million m^{3}) of material over and above the 30 million cu yd (23 million m^{3}) excavated by the French. As quickly as possible, the Americans replaced or upgraded the old, unusable French equipment with new construction equipment that was designed for a much larger and faster scale of work. 102 large, railroad-mounted steam shovels were purchased, 77 from Bucyrus-Erie, and 25 from the Marion Power Shovel Company. These were joined by enormous steam-powered cranes, giant hydraulic rock crushers, concrete mixers, dredges, and pneumatic power drills, nearly all of which were manufactured by new, extensive machine-building technology developed and built in the United States. The railroad also had to be comprehensively upgraded with heavy-duty, double-tracked rails over most of the line to accommodate new rolling stock. In many places, the new Gatun Lake flooded over the original rail line, and a new line had to be constructed above Gatun Lake's waterline.

The original lock canal plan called for a two-step set of locks at Sosa Hill and a long Sosa Lake extending to Pedro Miguel. In late 1907, it was decided to move the Sosa Hill locks further inland to Miraflores, mostly because the new site provided a more stable construction foundation. The resulting small lake Miraflores became a fresh water supply for Panama City.

Building the locks began with the first concrete laid at Gatun on August 24, 1909. The Gatun locks are built into a cutting into a hill bordering the lake, requiring the excavation of 3,800,000 m^{3} (4,970,212 cu yd) of material (mostly rock). The locks were made of 1,564,400 m^{3} (2,046,158 cu yd) of concrete, with an extensive system of electric railways and aerial lifts transporting concrete to the lock-construction sites.

The Pacific-side locks were finished first: the single flight at Pedro Miguel in 1911, and Miraflores in May 1913. The seagoing tugboat Gatun, an Atlantic-entrance tug used to haul barges, traversed the Gatun locks on September 26, 1913. The trip was successful, although the valves were controlled manually; the central control board was not yet ready.

Between 1912 and 1914 there was a controversy about the tolls for the canal.

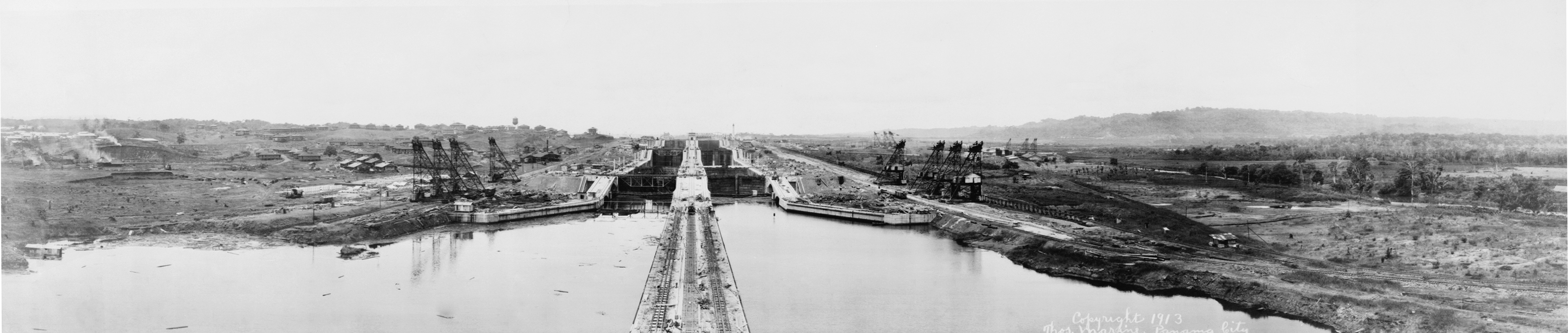
Construction of locks on the Panama Canal, 1913.

==== Opening ====
On October 10, 1913, President Woodrow Wilson sent a signal from the White House by telegraph, triggering an explosion that destroyed the Gamboa Dike. This flooded the Culebra Cut, thereby joining the Atlantic and Pacific oceans via the Panama Canal.

The construction of the canal was completed in 1914, 401 years after Panama was first crossed overland by the Europeans in Vasco Núñez de Balboa's party of conquistadores. The United States spent almost $500 million (roughly equivalent to $16.1 billion in 2025) to finish the project. This was by far the largest American engineering project to date. Throughout this time, Ernest "Red" Hallen was hired by the Isthmian Canal Commission to document the progress of the work.

On January 7, 1914, the Alexandre La Valley (a floating crane built by Lobnitz & Company and launched in 1887) became the first ship to make a complete transit of the Panama Canal under its own steam after working its way across during the final stages of construction. As construction wound down, the canal team began to disperse. Thousands of workers were laid off, and entire towns were disassembled or demolished. Chief sanitary officer William C. Gorgas, who left to fight pneumonia in the South African gold mines, became surgeon general of the Army. On April 1, 1914, the Isthmian Canal Commission disbanded, and the zone was governed by a Canal Zone Governor; the first governor was George Washington Goethals.

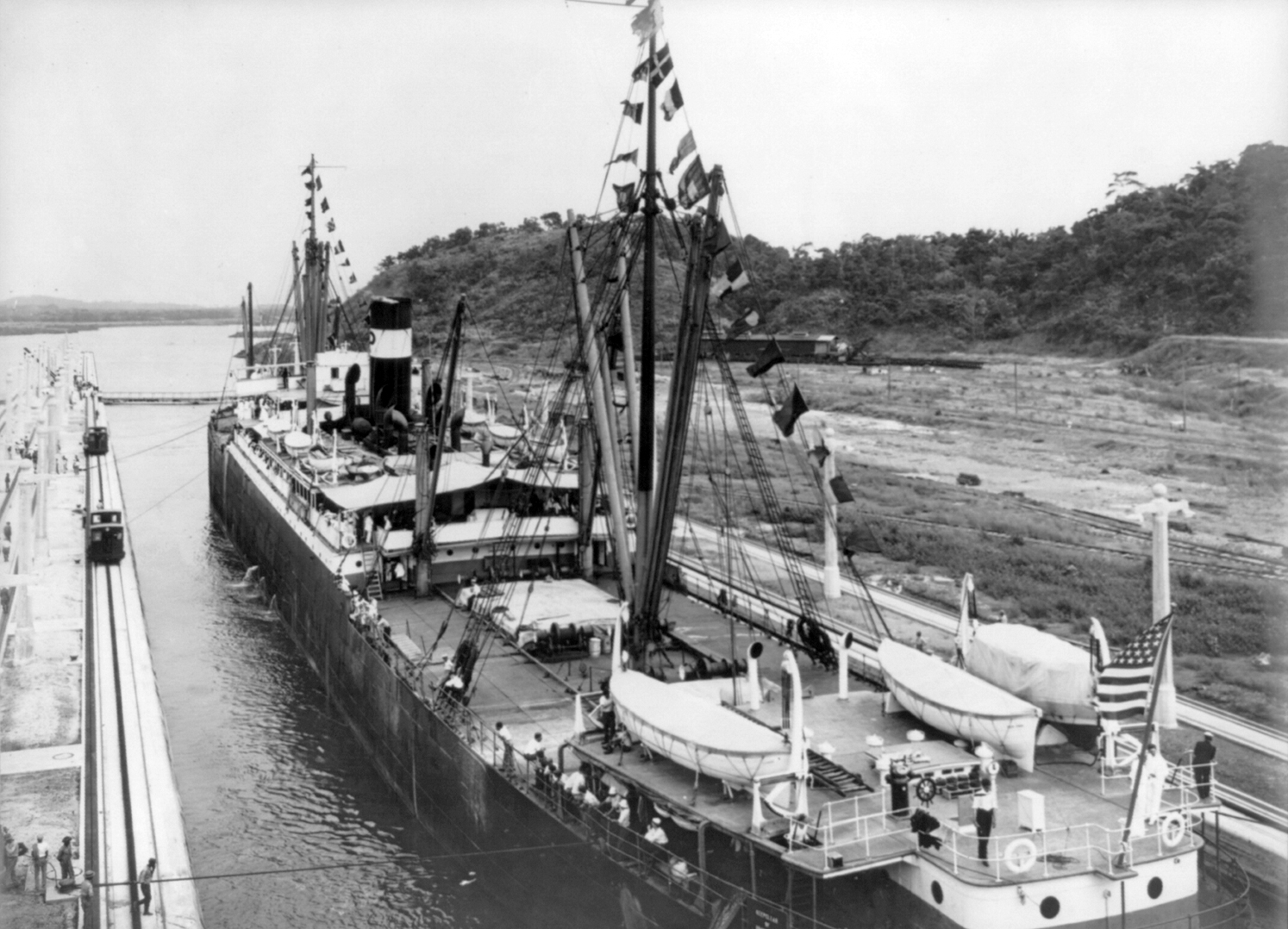
The first ship to transit the canal at the formal opening, SS Ancon, passes through on 15 August 1914.

SS Cristobal (a cargo and passenger ship built by Maryland Steel, and launched in 1902 as SS Tremont) on 3 August 1914, was the first ship to transit the canal from ocean to ocean. Although a large celebration was planned for the canal's opening, the outbreak of World War I forced the cancellation of the main festivities and it became a modest local affair. The Panama Railway steamship SS Ancon, piloted by Captain John A. Constantine (the canal's first pilot), made the first official transit on August 15, 1914. With no international dignitaries in attendance, Goethals followed the Ancon's progress by railroad.

Nautical chart of 1915 showing the canal shortly after completion

The opening of the Panama Canal in 1914 caused a severe drop in traffic along Chilean ports due to shifts in maritime trade routes, despite the closure of the canal for nearly seven months after a landslide in the Culebra Cut on 18 September 1915. The burgeoning sheep farming business in southern Patagonia suffered a significant setback by the change in trade routes, as did the economy of the Falkland Islands.

In 1914, steam shovels from the Panama Canal were purchased and put to use in Chuquicamata copper mine of northern Chile.

== Summary ==
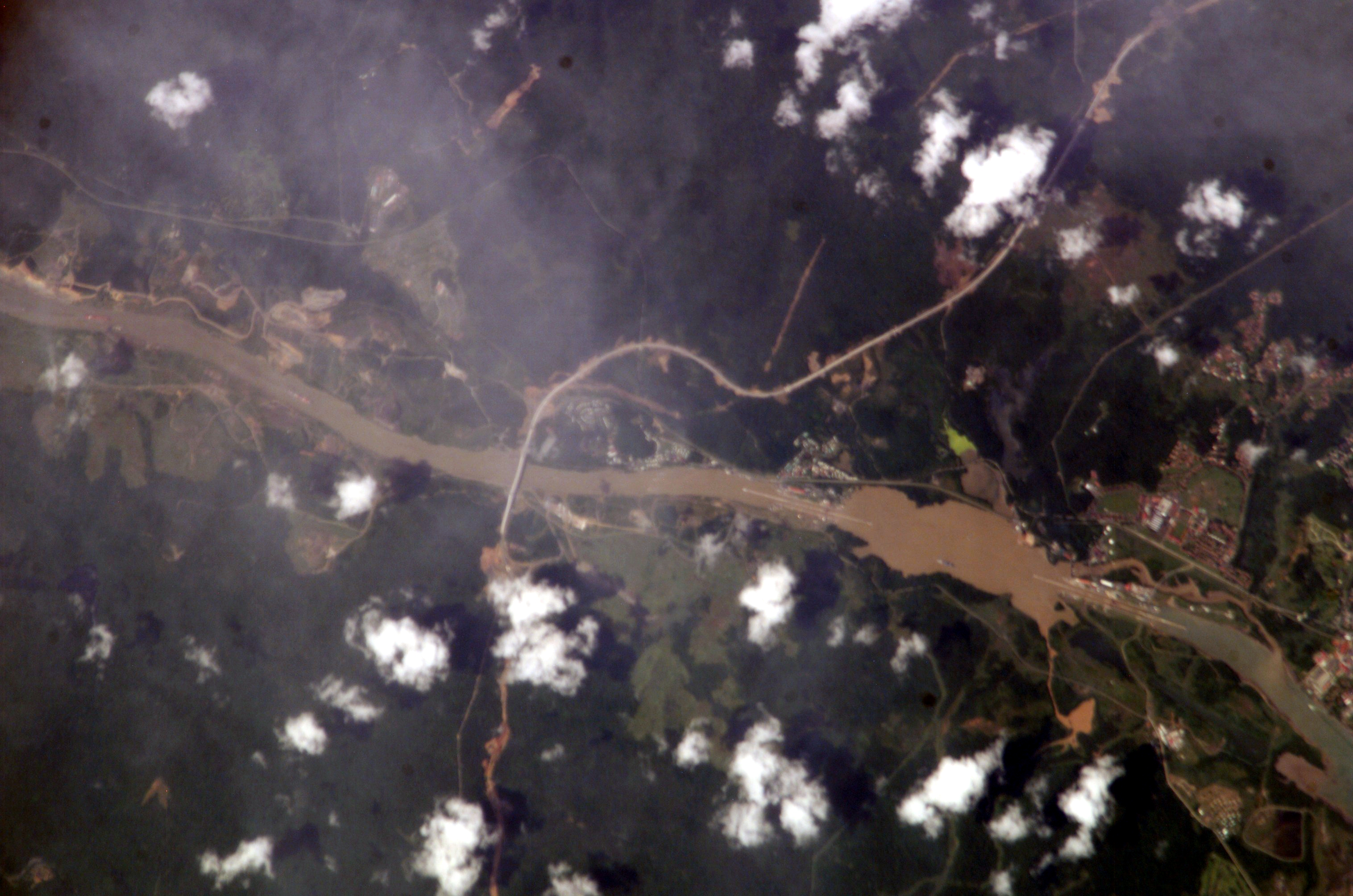
International Space Station photo showing (right to left) the Miraflores locks, Miraflores Lake, the Pedro Miguel locks and the Centennial Bridge

The canal was a technological marvel and an important strategic and economic asset to the US. It changed world shipping patterns, removing the need for ships to navigate the Drake Passage and Cape Horn. The canal saves a total of about 7,800 miles (12,600 km) on a sea trip from New York to San Francisco.

The anticipated military significance of the canal was proven during World War II, when the canal helped restore the devastated United States Pacific Fleet. Some of the largest ships the United States had to send through the canal were aircraft carriers, particularly Essex class; they were so large that although the locks could accommodate them, the lampposts along the canal had to be removed.

The Panama Canal cost the United States about $375 million, including $10 million paid to Panama and $40 million paid to the French company. Although it was the most expensive construction project in US history to that time, it cost about $23 million less than the 1907 estimate despite landslides and an increase in the canal's width. An additional $12 million was spent on fortifications.

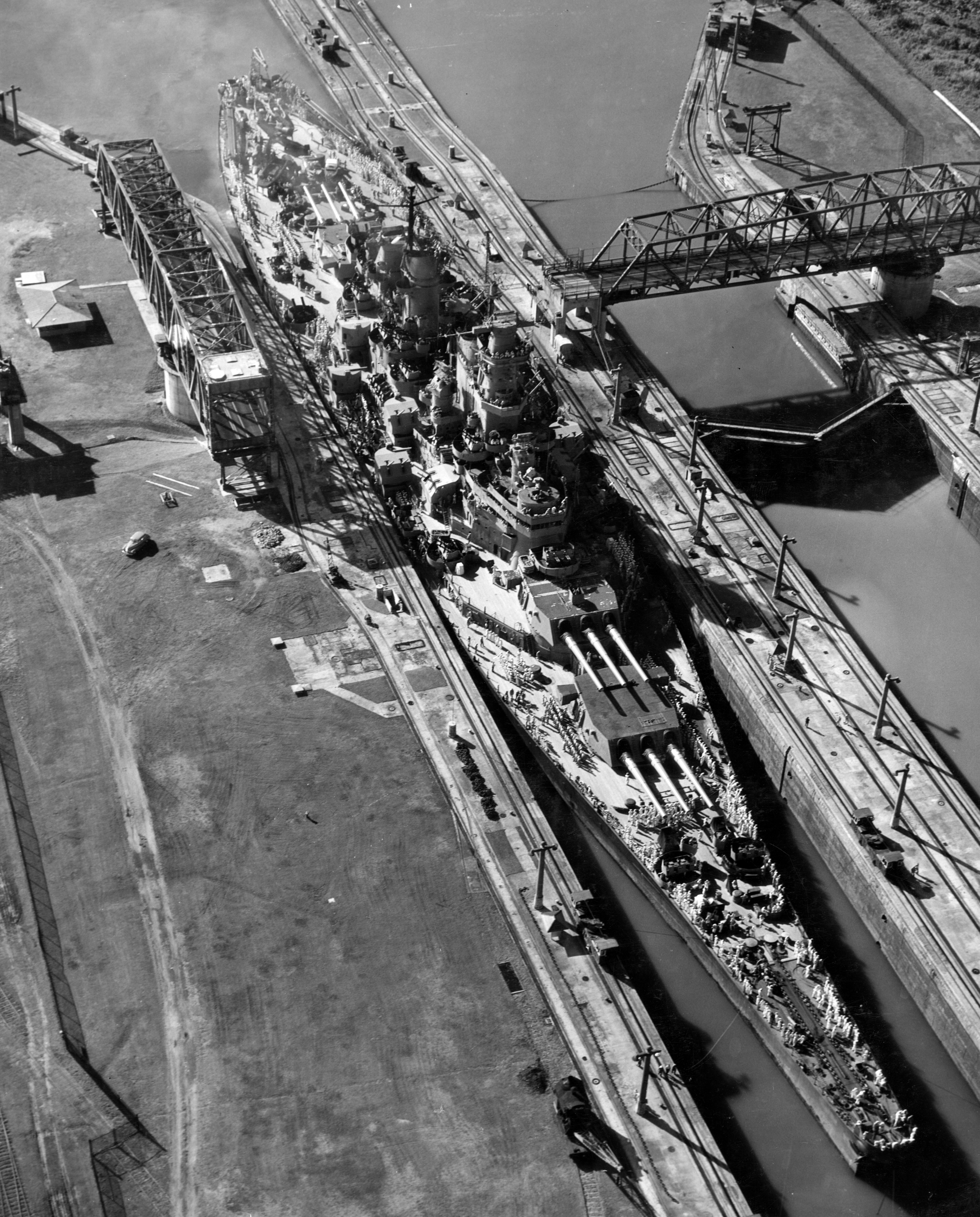
USS Missouri traverses the Panama Canal en route to the United States in October 1945

A total of over 75,000 people worked on the project; at the peak of construction, there were 40,000 workers.

Compared to the French era, fatalities in the American era were markedly low. Total deaths for all nationalities for the period of American involvement has been reported at 5,609-5,855. Of these, the great majority were West Indian laborers, particularly those from Barbados, who had substantially poorer living conditions and mosquito remediation controls than White workers. For example, for the years 1907 to 1913, in which employee fatalities were reported by race, there were 4,668 total fatalities, of which 900 (19%) were classified as "White" and 3,788 (81%) classified as "Colored". Additionally, a substantial number of White workers were non-Americans. For example, in 1908, of the 185 White employees who died, only 81 were from the United States. In total about 350 White Americans died in the building of the canal.

A total of 182,610,550 m^{3} (238,845,582 cu yd) of material was excavated in the American effort, including the approach channels at the canal ends. Adding the work by the French, the total excavation was about 204,900,000 m^{3} (268,000,000 cu yd) (over 25 times the volume excavated in the Channel Tunnel project).

The following words by Roosevelt are displayed in the rotunda of the canal's administration building in Balboa:

It is not the critic who counts, not the man who points out how the strong man stumbled, or where the doer of deeds could have done them better. The credit belongs to the man who is actually in the arena; whose face is marred by dust and sweat and blood; who strives valiantly, who errs and comes short again and again; who knows the great enthusiasms, the great devotions, and spends himself in a worthy cause; who, at the best, knows in the end the triumph of high achievement; and who, at the worst, if he fails, at least fails while daring greatly, so that his place shall never be with those cold and timid souls who know neither victory nor defeat.

David du Bose Gaillard died of a brain tumor in Baltimore on December 5, 1913, at age 54. Promoted to colonel only a month earlier, Gaillard never saw the opening of the canal whose creation he directed. The Culebra Cut (as it was originally known) was renamed the Gaillard Cut on April 27, 1915, in his honor. A plaque commemorating Gaillard's work stood over the cut for many years; in 1998 it was moved to the administration building, near a memorial to Goethals.

=== Later developments ===
By the 1930s, water supply became an issue for the canal, prompting construction of the Madden Dam across the Chagres River above Gatun Lake. Completed in 1935, the dam created Madden Lake (later Alajuela Lake), which provides additional water storage for the canal. In 1939, construction began on a further major improvement: a new set of locks large enough to carry the larger warships that the United States was building at the time and planned to continue building. The work proceeded for several years, and significant excavation was carried out on the new approach channels, but the project was canceled after World War II.

== Third-lane plans ==
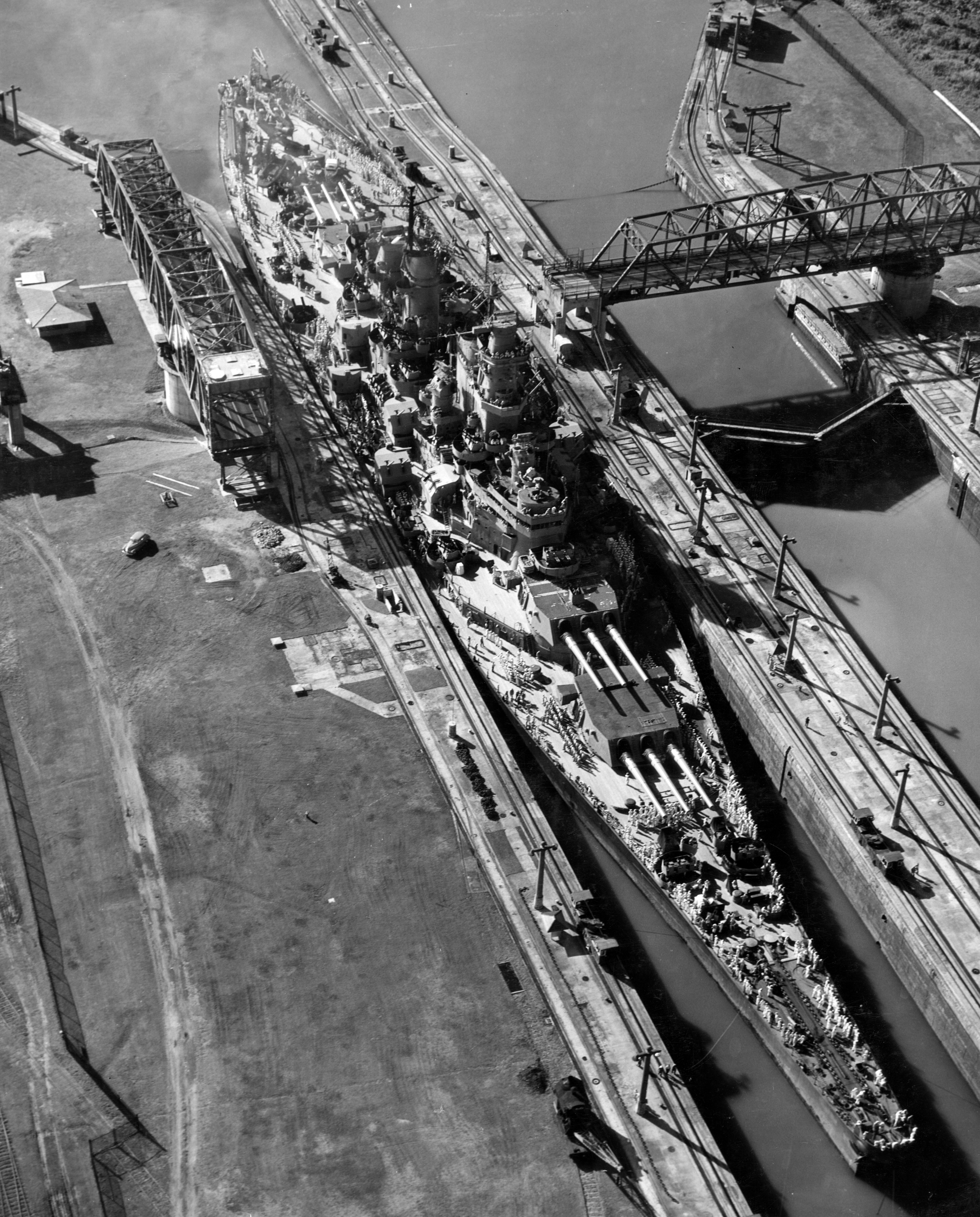
USS Missouri, an Iowa-class battleship, passes through the canal, 13 October 1945. The 108 ft 2 in (32.97 m) beams of the Iowas and preceding South Dakota class were the largest ever to transit the Canal.

In the Treaty of the Danish West Indies, the United States purchased the Virgin Islands in 1917 in part to defend the Panama Canal. As the situation in Europe and Asia deteriorated during the late 1930s, the US again became concerned about its ability to move warships between the oceans. The largest US battleships already had problems with the canal locks, and there were concerns that the locks could be incapacitated by bombing. These concerns were validated by several US naval exercises, which showed that the canal's defenses were inadequate.

These concerns led Congress to pass a resolution on May 1, 1936, authorizing a study of improving the canal's defenses against attack and expanding its capacity to handle large vessels. A special engineering section was created on July 3, 1937, to carry out the study. The section reported to Congress on February 24, 1939, recommending work to protect the existing locks and the construction of a new set of locks capable of carrying larger vessels than the existing locks could accommodate. On August 11, Congress authorized the work.

Three new locks were planned, at Gatún, Pedro Miguel and Miraflores, parallel to the existing locks with new approach channels. The new locks would add a traffic lane to the canal, with each chamber 1,200 ft (365.76 m) long, 140 ft (42.67 m) wide and 45 ft (13.72 m) deep. They would be 1/2 mi (805 m) east of the existing Gatún locks and 1/4 mi (402 m) west of the Pedro Miguel and Miraflores locks.

The first excavations for the new approach channels at Miraflores began on July 1, 1940, following the passage by Congress of an appropriations bill on June 24, 1940. The first dry excavation at Gatún began on February 19, 1941. Considerable material was excavated before the project was abandoned, and the unused approach channels can still be seen paralleling the original channels at Gatún and Miraflores.

In 2006, the Autoridad del Canal de Panamá (the Panama Canal Authority, or ACP) proposed a plan creating a third lane of locks using part of the abandoned 1940s approach canals. Following a referendum, work began in 2007 and the expanded canal began commercial operations on June 26, 2016. After a two-year delay, the new locks allow the transit of Neopanamax ships (which have a greater cargo capacity than the original locks can handle). The first ship to cross the canal through the third set of locks was a Panamax container ship, the Chinese-owned Cosco Shipping Panama. The cost of the expansion was estimated at $5.25 billion.

== Transfer to Panama ==
Statement on the Panama Canal treaty signing
Jimmy Carter's speech upon signing the Panama Canal treaty, September 7, 1977

Statement on the Panama Canal treaty signing
Audio-only version

After construction, the canal and the Canal Zone surrounding it were administered by the United States. After World War II, US control of the canal and the Canal Zone surrounding it became contentious; relations between Panama and the United States became increasingly tense. Many Panamanians felt that the Zone rightfully belonged to Panama; student protests were met by the fencing-in of the zone and an increased military presence there. Demands for the United States to hand over the canal to Panama increased after the Suez Crisis in 1956, when the United States used financial and diplomatic pressure to force France and the UK to abandon their attempt to retake control of the Suez Canal, previously nationalized by the Nasser regime in Egypt. Panamanian unrest culminated in riots on Martyr's Day, 9 January 1964, when about 20 Panamanians and 3–5 US soldiers were killed.

A decade later, in 1974, negotiations toward a settlement began. On September 7, 1977, US President Jimmy Carter and Omar Torrijos, de facto leader of Panama, signed the Torrijos-Carter Treaty setting in motion the process of transferring control of the canal to Panama, so long as Panama guaranteed the permanent neutrality of the canal. The treaty became effective on October 2, 1979, providing for a 20-year period in which Panama would have increasing responsibility for canal operations before a complete US withdrawal and full Panamanian control on December 31, 1999. Since then, the canal has been administered by the Panama Canal Authority (Autoridad de Canal de Panama, or ACP). The Panama Canal remains one of the chief revenue sources for Panama.

The transfer of the canal came under heavy attack from conservatives, especially the American Conservative Union, the Conservative Caucus, the Committee for the Survival of a Free Congress, Citizens for the Republic, the American Security Council, the Young Republicans, the National Conservative Political Action Committee, the Council for National Defense, Young Americans for Freedom, the Council for Inter-American Security, and the Campus Republican Action Organization. The treaty narrowly passed with the required 2/3 vote in the Senate. Though Panamanians welcomed the return of sovereignty over the Panama Canal, many people at the time also expressed fears of the possible negative economic repercussions.

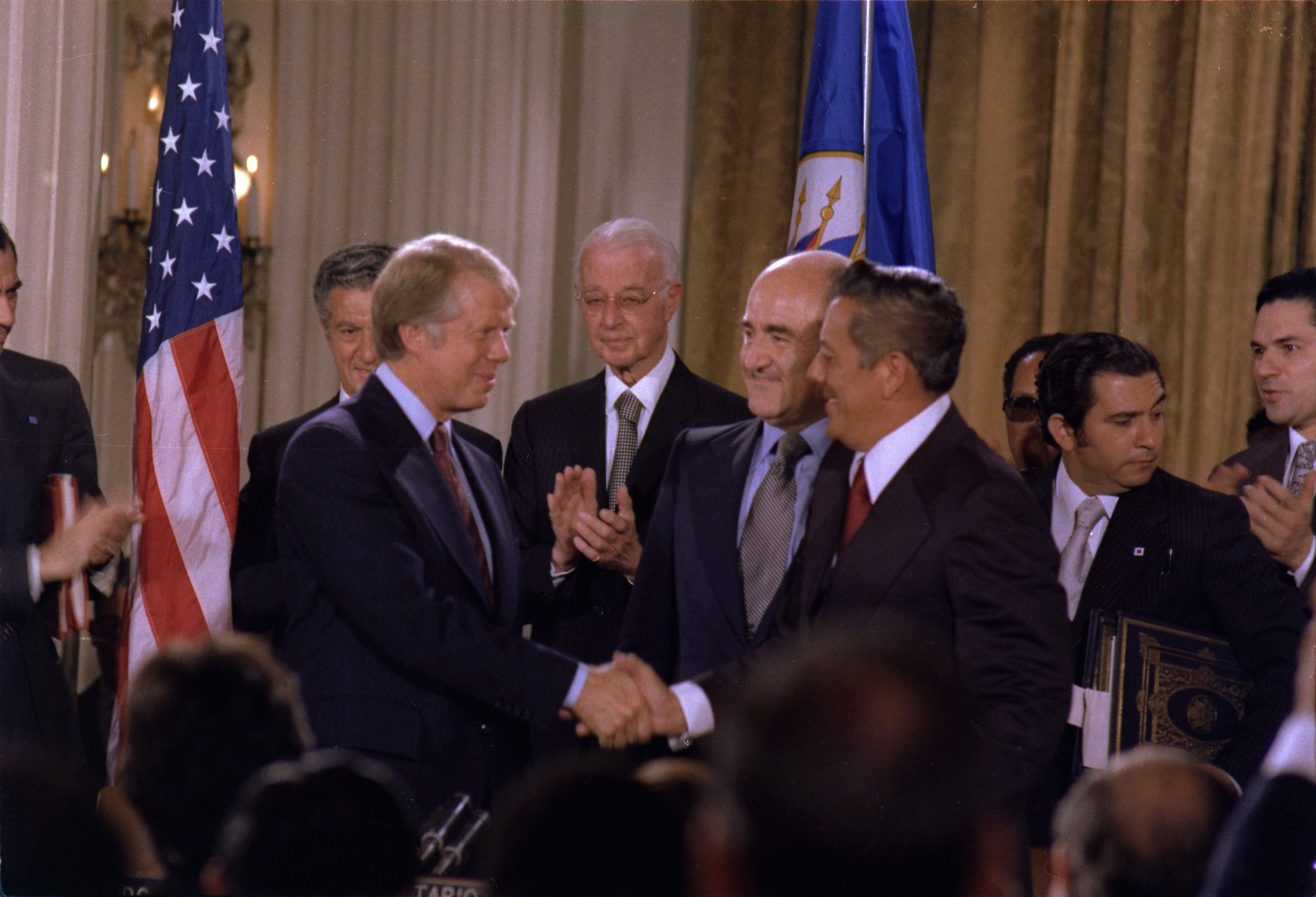
Jimmy Carter and Omar Torrijos shake hands moments after the signing of the Torrijos–Carter Treaties.

Although concerns existed in the US and the shipping industry about the canal after the transfer, Panama has exercised good stewardship. On October 22, 2006, Panamanian citizens approved a referendum to expand the canal.

Former US Ambassador to Panama Linda Ellen Watt, who served from 2002 to 2005, said that the canal operation in Panamanian hands has been "outstanding". "The international shipping community is quite pleased", Watt added.

Statement on the Panama Canal Treaty Signing
President Jimmy Carter's speech upon signing the Panama Canal treaty, 7 September 1977

Before this handover, the government of Panama held an international bid to negotiate a 25-year contract for operation of the container shipping ports located at the canal's Atlantic and Pacific outlets. The contract was not affiliated with the ACP or Panama Canal operations and was won by the firm Hutchison Whampoa, a Hong Kong–based shipping interest owned by Li Ka-shing.

=== Demands by Donald Trump to reclaim U.S. control of the canal ===
On 21 December 2024, then U.S. President-elect Donald Trump threatened that the United States would retake control of the Panama Canal from Panama, stating that the rates Panama was charging American ships were "exorbitant" and in violation of the Torrijos–Carter Treaties. The following day, Trump claimed that the canal was "falling into the wrong hands" and brought up China. Shortly afterwards, Panamanian president José Raúl Mulino responded. He denied that the United States was being unfairly charged or that anyone besides Panama was in full control of the canal, and affirmed that the canal was part of the country's "inalienable patrimony".

On 24 December, a protest was held at the U.S. Embassy in Panama City over Trump's threat to take back the Panama Canal. Protesters referred to him as a "public enemy" of Panama. On the same day, the Bolivarian Alliance for the Peoples of Our America (ALBA), made up of ten Central and South American countries, denounced Trump's comments and affirmed its support for Panama's "sovereignty, territorial integrity and self-determination."

On 7 January 2025 Trump, in a press conference, vowed to gain control of the Panama Canal. He refused to rule out economic and military action against Panama to seize control of the canal, to secure what he called U.S. "economic security." He reiterated his intent to take back control of the canal in his inaugural address on 20 January.

Panama Canal Repurchase Act

United States House of Representatives
- Long title: To authorize the President to enter into negotiations for the reacquisition of the Panama Canal from the Republic of Panama
- Citation: H.R. 283
- Territorial extent: United States
- Introduced by: Dusty Johnson
- Committee responsible: United States House Committee on Foreign Affairs

Keywords
- U.S. territorial sovereignty
- Status: Pending

==== Panama Canal Repurchase Act ====
On 9 January 2025, legislation was introduced in the U.S. House of Representatives by Rep. Dusty Johnson for the United States Government to repurchase the Panama canal on behalf of the U.S. As of the date of introduction, the bill had 16 co-sponsors and had been referred to the United States House Committee on Foreign Affairs for review.

==== Later updates ====
On February 2, 2025, U.S. secretary of state Marco Rubio visited Panama and told Panamanian president José Raúl Mulino that Panama must reduce Chinese influence in the Panama Canal or face consequences; Panama stated that it would not renew its membership in China's Belt and Road Initiative following expiration. On 2 January 2026, President Mulino declared the crisis with the United States to be over, stating that "Panama moved toward a relationship of respect, restored trust, joint work, and friendship, and the canal remained Panamanian."

== See also ==
- Corozal "Silver" Cemetery – a cemetery near Panama City dedicated to workers on the Panama Canal.
- Latin America–United States relations
- Operation Pelikan
