= Panama Canal =

Shipping route across Central America

Panama Canal Canal de Panamá
- A schematic of the Panama Canal, illustrating the sequence of locks and passages
- Interactive map of the canal

Specifications
- Length: 82 km (51 miles)
- Maximum boat length: 366 m (1,200 ft 9 in)
- Maximum boat beam: 49 m (160 ft 9 in) (originally 28.5 m or 93 ft 6 in)
- Maximum boat draft: 15.2 m (50 ft)
- Maximum boat air draft: 57.91 m (190.0 ft)
- Locks: 3 locks up, 3 down per transit; all three lanes (3 lanes of locks)
- Status: Opened in 1914; 112 years ago; expansion opened 26 June 2016
- Navigation authority: Panama Canal Authority

History
- Principal engineer: Armand Reclus and Gaston Blanchet (1881–1882), Jules Dingler (1883–1885), Maurice Hutin (1885), Philippe Bunau-Varilla (1885–1886, acting), Léo Boyer (1886), M. Nouailhac-Pioch (1886, acting), M. Jacquier (1886–1889), Philippe Bunau-Varilla (1894–1903), John Findley Wallace (1904–1905), John Frank Stevens (1905–1907), George Washington Goethals (1907–1914)
- Construction began: 1 January 1881
- Date completed: 15 August 1914
- Date extended: 26 June 2016

Geography
- Start point: Caribbean Sea (part of Atlantic Ocean)
- End point: Pacific Ocean
- Connects to: Pacific Ocean and Atlantic Ocean

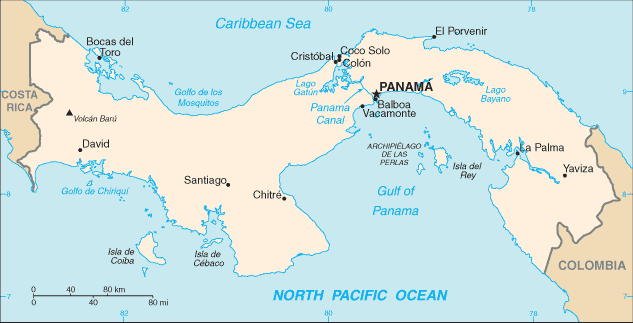
Location of Panama between the Pacific Ocean (bottom) and the Caribbean Sea (top), with the canal at top center

The Panama Canal (Spanish: Canal de Panamá) is an artificial 82-kilometer (51-mile) waterway in Panama that connects the Caribbean Sea in the Atlantic Ocean with the Pacific Ocean. It cuts across the narrowest point of the Isthmus of Panama and is a conduit for maritime trade between the Atlantic Ocean and the Pacific Ocean. Locks at each end lift ships up to Gatun Lake, an artificial fresh water lake 26 meters (85 ft) above sea level, created by damming the Chagres River and Lake Alajuela to reduce the amount of excavation work required for the canal. Locks then lower the ships at the other end. The original locks are 33.5 meters (110 ft) wide and allow the passage of Panamax ships. A third, wider lane of locks was constructed between September 2007 and May 2016. The expanded waterway began commercial operation on 26 June 2016. The new locks allow for the transit of larger, Neopanamax ships. An average of 200,000,000 litres (52 million US gallons) of fresh water is used in a single passing of a ship. The canal is threatened by low water levels during droughts.

The Panama Canal shortcut greatly reduces the time for ships to travel between the Atlantic and Pacific oceans, enabling them to avoid the lengthy, hazardous route around the southernmost tip of South America via the Drake Passage, the Strait of Magellan or the Beagle Channel. Its construction was one of the largest and most difficult engineering projects ever undertaken. Since its inauguration on 15 August 1914, the canal has succeeded in shortening maritime communication in time and distance, invigorating maritime and economic transportation by providing a short and relatively inexpensive transit route between the two oceans, decisively influencing global trade patterns, boosting economic growth in developed and developing countries, as well as providing the basic impetus for economic expansion in many remote regions of the world.

Colombia, France, and later the United States controlled the territory surrounding the canal during construction. France began work on the canal in 1881, but stopped in 1889 because of a lack of investors' confidence due to engineering problems and a high worker mortality rate. The US took over the project in 1904 and opened the canal in 1914. The US continued to control the canal and the surrounding Panama Canal Zone until the Torrijos–Carter Treaties provided for its handover to Panama in 1977. After a period of joint American–Panamanian control, the Panamanian government took control in 1999. It is now managed and operated by the Panamanian government-owned Panama Canal Authority. Annual traffic has risen from about 1,000 ships in 1914, when the canal opened, to 14,702 vessels in 2008, for a total of 333.7 million Panama Canal/Universal Measurement System (PC/UMS) tons. By 2012, more than 815,000 vessels had passed through the canal. In that year, the top five users of the canal were the United States, China, Chile, Japan, and South Korea. In 2017, it took ships an average of 11.38 hours to pass between the canal's two outer locks. The American Society of Civil Engineers has ranked the Panama Canal one of the Seven Wonders of the Modern World.

== History ==
=== Early proposals in Panama ===
The idea of the Panama Canal dates back to 1513, when the Spanish conquistador Vasco Núñez de Balboa (c.1475–1519) first crossed the Isthmus of Panama. He wrote in his journal the possibility of a canal but did not take action. European powers soon noticed the possibility of digging a water passage between the Atlantic and Pacific Oceans across this narrow land bridge between North and South America. The earliest proposal dates to 1534, when the Holy Roman Emperor Charles V ordered a survey for a route through the Americas in order to ease the voyage for ships traveling between Spain and Peru. In 1668, the English physician and philosopher Sir Thomas Browne specifically proposed the Isthmus of Panama as the most convenient place for such a canal.

The first attempt to make the isthmus part of a trade route was the ill-fated Darien scheme, launched by the Kingdom of Scotland (1698–1700), which was abandoned because of the inhospitable conditions.

In 1811, the German naturalist Alexander von Humboldt published an essay on the geography of the Spanish colonies in Central America (Essai politique sur le royaume de la Nouvelle Espagne; translated into English as: Political essay on the kingdom of New Spain containing researches relative to the geography of Mexico). In the essay, he considered five possible routes for a canal across Central America, including Panama, but concluded that the most promising location was across Nicaragua, traversing Lake Nicaragua. His recommendations influenced the British to attempt a canal across Nicaragua in 1843. Although this attempt in the end came to nothing, it resulted in the Clayton–Bulwer Treaty (1850) between the United Kingdom and the United States, in which the two nations bound each other to joint control of any canal built in Nicaragua or (by implication) anywhere in Central America.

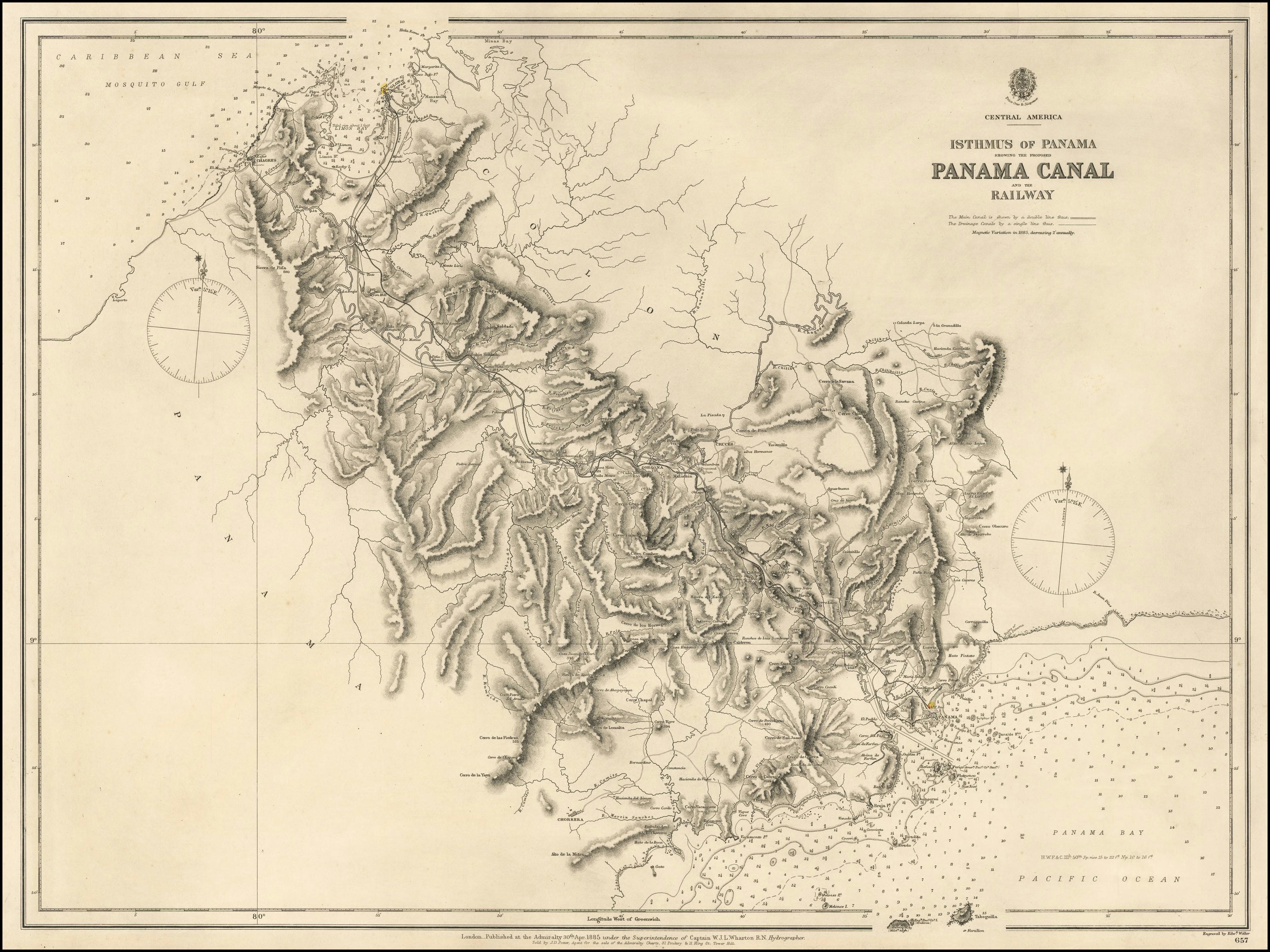
An 1885 map showing the Railway and the proposed Panama Canal route

In 1846, the Mallarino–Bidlack Treaty, negotiated between the US and New Granada (the predecessor of Colombia), granted the United States transit rights and the right to intervene militarily in the isthmus. In 1848, the discovery of gold in California created a demand for a crossing of Panama as a practical route between the Atlantic and Pacific oceans. This demand was exploited by American businessman William Henry Aspinwall, who ran steamship legs from New York City to Panama, and from Panama to California, with an overland portage through Panama. This route was soon exploited by other businessmen, such as Cornelius Vanderbilt. Between 1850 and 1855, a syndicate founded by Aspinwall built a railroad (now the Panama Canal Railway) from Colón on the Caribbean Sea to Panama City. The project cost US$8,000,000 (six times the estimated cost) and the lives of between 6,000 and 12,000 construction workers who succumbed to Tropical diseases. The railroad soon became immensely profitable for its owners.

In 1870, US President Grant established an Interoceanic Canal Commission, which included Chief of Engineers Brigadier General Andrew A Humphreys as its members. It commissioned several naval officers, including Commander Thomas Oliver Selfridge Jr., to investigate the possible routes suggested by Humboldt for a canal across Central America. The commission decided in favour of Nicaragua, establishing this as the preferred route amongst American policy-makers.

=== French construction attempts, 1881–1899 ===
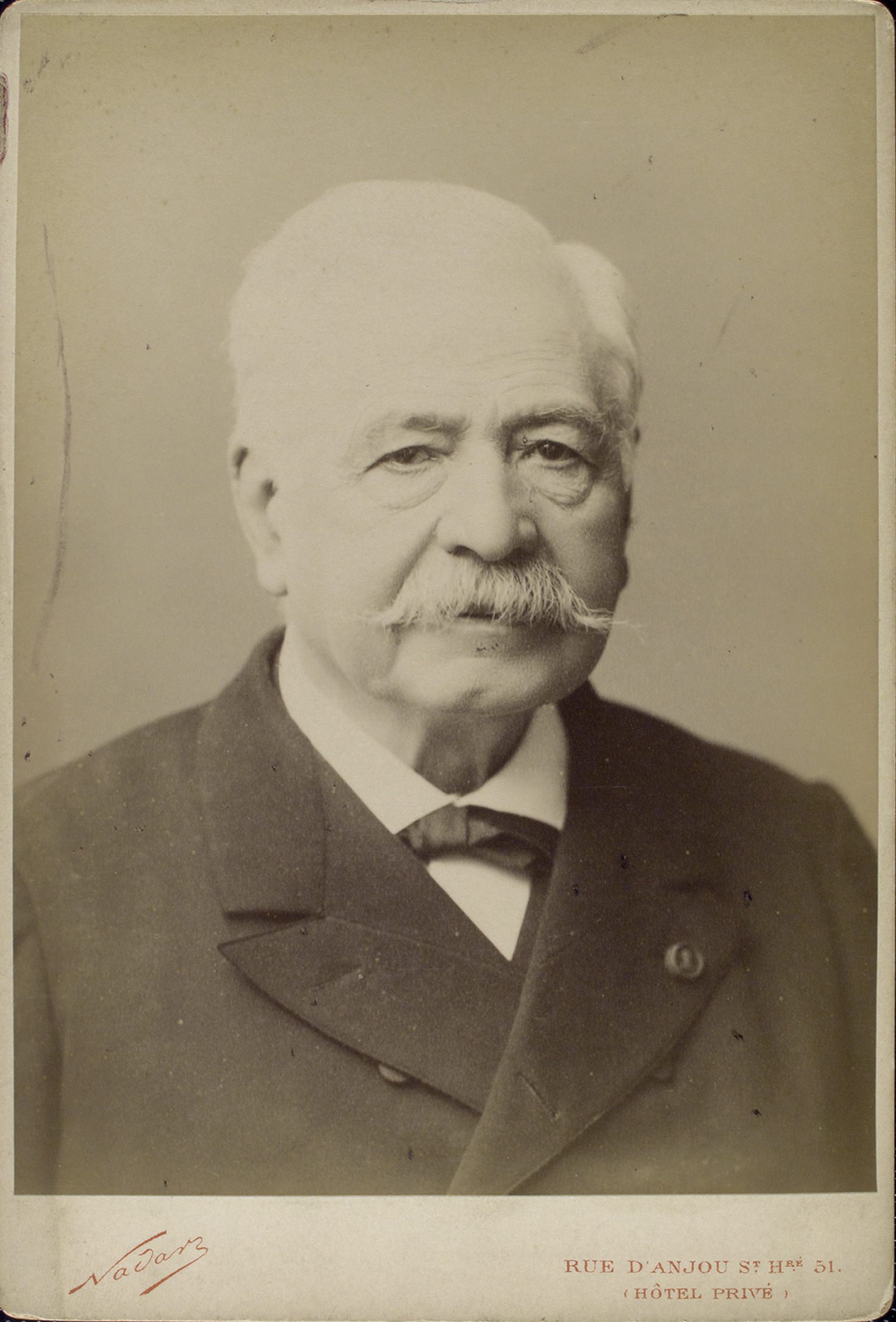
Ferdinand de Lesseps, the French originator of the Suez Canal and the Panama Canal

The French diplomat and entrepreneur Ferdinand de Lesseps and engineer Philippe Bunau-Varilla were the driving forces behind the French attempts to construct the Panama Canal (1881–1889). De Lesseps had made his reputation by successfully constructing the Suez Canal (1859–1869), a route that had soon proved its value in international commerce. After this success, he actively sought new projects. In 1875, de Lesseps was approached by the Société Civile Internationale du Canal Interocéanique par l'isthme du Darien (also known as the "Türr Syndicate"), a syndicate formed to promote the building of an interoceanic canal across Panama. Its directors were Hungarian freedom fighter István Türr, financier Jacques de Reinach and Türr's brother-in-law Lt. Lucien Bonaparte-Wyse. Between 1876 and 1878, Bonaparte-Wyse and Armand Reclus investigated several potential routes across the isthmus of Panama. Bonaparte-Wyse rode by horseback to Bogotá, where he obtained a concession from the Colombian government to build a canal across Panama (20 March 1878). The agreement, known as the Wyse Concession, was valid for 99 years and allowed the company to dig a canal and exploit it.

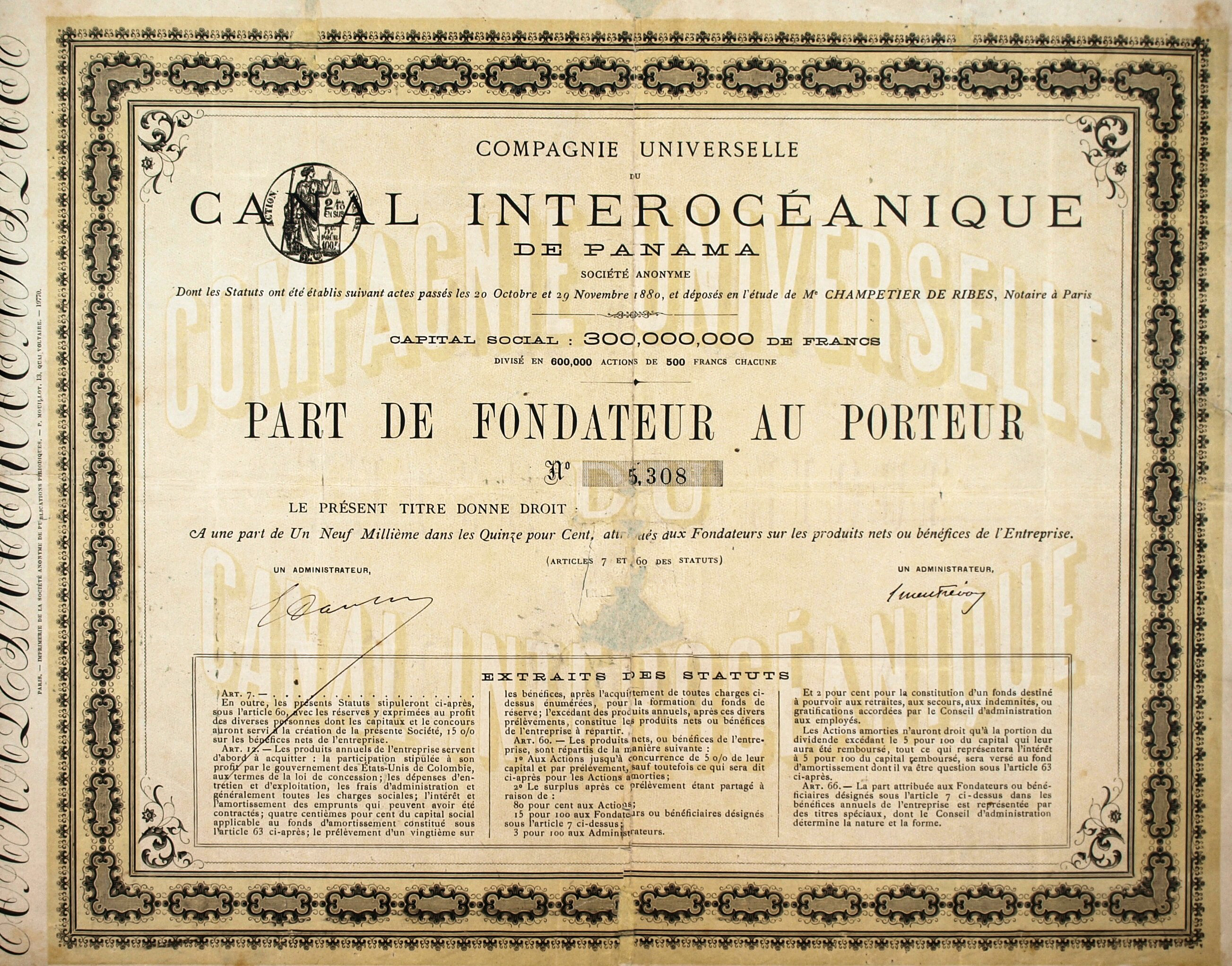
Part de Fondateur of the Compagnie Universelle du Canal Interocéanique de Panama, issued 29 November 1880

In May 1879, de Lesseps convened an international congress in Paris at the Société de Géographie to examine the possibilities of a ship canal across Central America. Among the 136 delegates of 26 countries, only 42 were engineers, with the remainder being speculators, politicians, and friends of de Lesseps, who used the congress to promote fundraising for his preferred scheme, which was to build a sea-level canal across Panama, similar in manner to the Suez Canal. At the conference, the chief engineer of the French Department of Bridges and Highways, Baron Godin de Lépinay proposed a canal plan consisting of locks, the flooding and use of lakes (at Gatun) and a cut through the hilly terrain at Culebra. However, Lépinay's plan was dismissed in favour of Lessep's proposal for a sea level canal, although the locks plan would later be implemented under US control. Lesseps won the approval of a majority of the delegates for his plan despite reservations expressed by some who preferred a canal in Nicaragua or who emphasized the likely engineering difficulties and health risks. Following the congress, de Lesseps organized a company to construct the canal (the Compagnie Universelle du Canal Interocéanique de Panama). The company bought the Wyse Concession from the Türr Syndicate and raised considerable funds from small French investors on the basis of the huge profits generated by the Suez Canal.

Construction of the canal began on 1 January 1881, with digging at Culebra beginning on 22 January. A large labor force was assembled, numbering about 40,000 in 1888 (nine-tenths of whom were afro-Caribbean workers from the West Indies). Although the project attracted good, well-paid French engineers, retaining them was difficult due to disease. The death toll from 1881 to 1889 was estimated at over 22,000, of whom as many as 5,000 were French citizens.

From the beginning, the French canal project faced difficulties. Although the Panama Canal needed to be only 40 percent as long as the Suez Canal, it was much more of an engineering challenge because of the combination of tropical rain forests, debilitating climate, the need for canal locks, and the lack of any ancient route to follow. Beginning with Armand Reclus in 1882, a series of principal engineers resigned in discouragement. The workers were unprepared for the conditions of the rainy season, during which the Chagres River, where the canal started, became a raging torrent, rising up to 10 m (33 ft). Workers had to continually widen the main cut through the mountain at Culebra and reduce the angles of the slopes to minimize landslides into the canal. The dense jungle was alive with venomous snakes, insects, and spiders, but the worst challenges were yellow fever, malaria, and other tropical diseases, which killed thousands of workers; by 1884, the death rate was over 200 per month. Public health measures were ineffective because the role of the mosquito as a disease vector was then unknown. Conditions were downplayed in France to avoid recruitment problems, but the high mortality rate made it difficult to maintain an experienced workforce.

In France, de Lesseps kept the investment and supply of workers flowing long after it was obvious that the targets were not being met, but eventually, the money ran out. The French effort went bankrupt in 1889 after reportedly spending US$287,000,000 ($10.3 billion in 2025); an estimated 22,000 men died from disease and accidents, and the savings of 800,000 investors were lost. Work was suspended on 15 May, and in the ensuing scandal, known as the Panama affair, some of those deemed responsible were prosecuted, including Gustave Eiffel. De Lesseps and his son Charles were found guilty of misappropriation of funds and sentenced to five years' imprisonment. This sentence was later overturned, and the father, at age 88, was never imprisoned.

In 1894, a second French company, the Compagnie Nouvelle du Canal de Panama, was created to take over the project. A minimal workforce of a few thousand people was employed primarily to comply with the terms of the Colombian Panama Canal concession, to run the Panama Railroad, and to maintain the existing excavation and equipment in salable condition. The company sought a buyer for these assets, with an asking price of US$109,000,000 ($4.06 billion in 2025). In the meantime, they continued with enough activity to maintain their franchise. Two lobbyists would become particularly active in later negotiations to sell the interests of the Compagnie Nouvelle. The American lawyer William Nelson Cromwell began looking after the interests of the company in 1894, after first acting for the related Panama Railroad. He would become deeply involved as a lobbyist in the American decisions to continue the canal in Panama, and to support Panamanian independence. The other was Philippe Bunau-Varilla, who, as one of the major subcontractors to the first French company, had been compelled by the receivers to take shares in the Compagnie Nouvelle, and was then named director of engineering in the Compagnie Nouvelle.

=== United States acquisition ===
In 1897–1899, US President William McKinley (1897–1901) tasked two commissions headed by Admiral John Grimes Walker to recommend the best route for a canal across Central America. Although the first commission had been tasked only to consider routes across Nicaragua, William Nelson Cromwell successfully lobbied the Government to broaden the terms of reference to also consider the Panamanian isthmus. The commission issued a confidential preliminary report on 21 November 1901, shortly after Theodore Roosevelt had become president following the assassination of McKinley. The preliminary report favored the Nicaragua route on pricing grounds; although the commissioners noted the technical advantages of the Panama route, they considered its informally quoted price of $109 million ($4.22 billion in 2025) to be excessive. The report was leaked to Philippe Bunau-Varilla, who during an emergency shareholders' meeting of the Compagnie Nouvelle amended the price to a formal offer of $40 million ($1.49 billion in 2025), the estimated sale value of the existing Panama assets acceptable to the commissioners. On 10 December, George S. Morison, the most eminent engineer on the commission, wrote a letter to President Roosevelt giving the technical reasons for preferring the Panama route. In January 1902, Roosevelt called the members of the commission into his office individually and asked them to give their own personal evaluations of the best route. Roosevelt then held a closed meeting with the entire commission, where he made it clear that he wanted the offer to take over the Panama route from the Compagnie Nouvelle to be accepted. In late January, the commission issued a final report, unanimously recommending Panama.

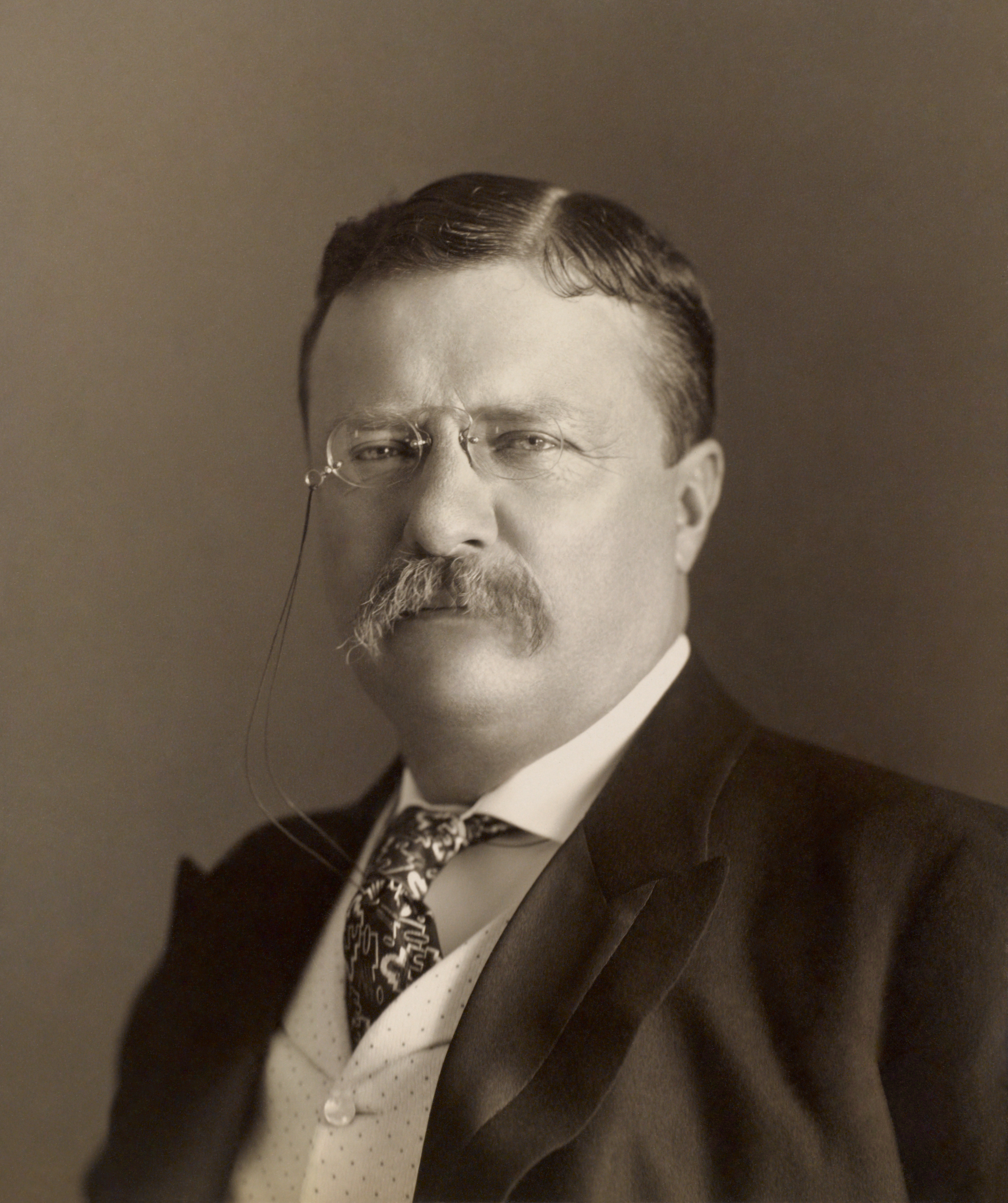
United States President Theodore Roosevelt (1901–1909), the driving force behind US construction of the Panama Canal.

The proposal to purchase the French rights to Panama faced considerable opposition in Congress, since the Nicaragua proposal was preferred by many. The Nicaragua route was championed by Senator John T. Morgan, who grilled members of the Walker Commission on their reasons for recommending Panama. Nonetheless, the proposal to purchase the French rights and property in Panama for $40 million was eventually approved by both Houses of Congress, championed by Senator Mark Hanna. He was supported by the known backing of President Roosevelt for the proposal, and by the lobbying efforts of Cromwell and Bunau-Varilla. In June 1902, the US Senate voted in favor of the Spooner Act to pursue the Panamanian option, provided the necessary rights could be obtained.

On 22 January 1903, the Hay–Herrán Treaty was signed by United States Secretary of State John M. Hay and Colombian Chargé Tomás Herrán. For $10 million ($358 million in 2025) and an annual payment of $250,000 for the next nine years, it would have granted the United States a renewable lease in perpetuity from Colombia on the land proposed for the canal. The treaty was ratified by the US Senate on 14 March 1903, but the Senate of Colombia unanimously rejected the treaty since it had become significantly unpopular in Bogotá due to concerns over insufficient compensation, threat to sovereignty, and perpetuity.

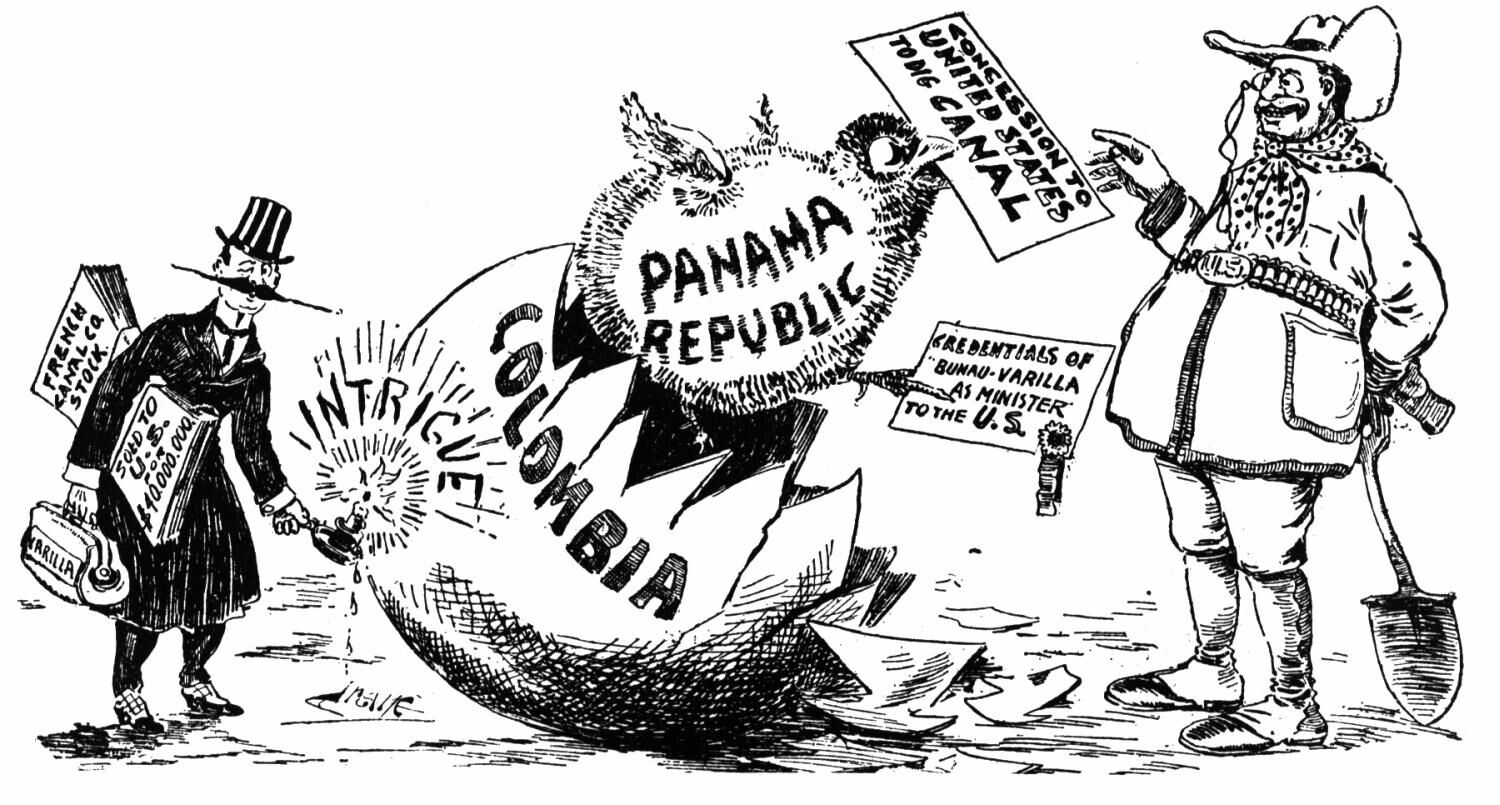
The US's intentions to influence the area (especially the Panama Canal construction and control) led to the separation of Panama from Colombia in 1903.

Roosevelt then changed tactics, based in part on the Mallarino–Bidlack Treaty of 1846, and actively supported the separation of Panama from Colombia. Shortly after recognizing Panama, he signed a treaty with the new Panamanian government under terms similar to the Hay–Herrán Treaty.

On 2 November 1903, US warships blocked sea lanes against possible Colombian troop movements en route to put down the Panama rebellion. Panama declared independence on 3 November 1903. The United States quickly recognized the new nation. This happened so quickly that by the time the Colombian government in Bogotá launched a response to the Panamanian uprising US troops had already entered the rebelling province. The Colombian troops dispatched to Panama were hastily assembled conscripts with little training. While these conscripts may have been able to defeat the Panamanian rebels, they would not have been able to defeat the US army troops that were supporting the Panamanian rebels. An army of conscripts was the best response the Colombians could muster, as Colombia was recovering from a civil war between Liberals and Conservatives from October 1899, to November 1902, known as the "Thousand Days War". The US was fully aware of these conditions and even incorporated them into the planning of the Panama intervention as the US acted as an arbitrator between the two sides. The peace treaty that ended the "Thousand Days War" was signed on the USS Wisconsin on 21 November 1902. While in port, the US also brought engineering teams to Panama with the peace delegation to begin planning the canal's construction before the US had even gained the rights to build the canal. All these factors would result in the Colombians being unable to put down the Panamanian rebellion and expel the United States troops occupying what today is the independent nation of Panama.

On 6 November 1903, Philippe Bunau-Varilla, as Panama's ambassador to the United States, signed the Hay–Bunau-Varilla Treaty, granting rights to the United States to build and administer the Panama Canal Zone and its defenses. This treaty gave the US some rights to the canal "in perpetuity", but in article 22 limited other rights to a lease period of 99 years. Almost immediately, the treaty was condemned by many Panamanians as an infringement on their country's new national sovereignty. This would later become a contentious diplomatic issue among Colombia, Panama, and the United States.

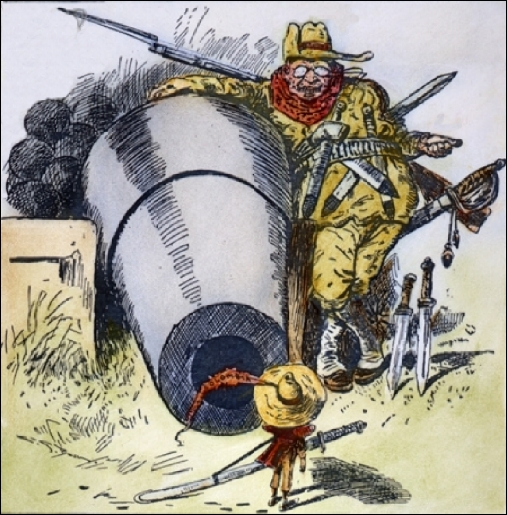
1903 cartoon: "Go Away, Little Man, and Don't Bother Me". President Theodore Roosevelt intimidating Colombia to acquire the Panama Canal Zone.

President Roosevelt famously stated, "I took the Isthmus, started the canal and then left Congress not to debate the canal, but to debate me." Several parties in the United States called this an act of war on Colombia: The New York Times described the support given by the United States to Bunau-Varilla as an "act of sordid conquest". The New York Evening Post called it a "vulgar and mercenary venture". The US maneuvers are often cited as the classic example of US gunboat diplomacy in Latin America, and the best illustration of what Roosevelt meant by the adage, "Speak softly and carry a big stick [and] you will go far."

In 1904, the United States purchased the French equipment and excavations, including the Panama Railroad, for US$40 million, of which $30 million related to excavations completed, primarily in the Culebra Cut, valued at about $1.00 per cubic yard ($1.3/m^{3}). The United States also paid the new country of Panama $10 million and a $250,000 payment each following year.

In 1921, Colombia and the United States entered into the Thomson–Urrutia Treaty, in which the United States agreed to pay Colombia $25 million: $5 million upon ratification, and four $5 million annual payments, and grant Colombia special privileges in the Canal Zone. In return, Colombia recognized Panama as an independent nation.

=== United States construction of the Panama canal, 1904–1914 ===
The US formally took control of the canal property on 4 May 1904, inheriting from the French a depleted workforce and a vast jumble of buildings, infrastructure, and equipment, much of it in poor condition. A US government commission, the Isthmian Canal Commission (ICC), was established to oversee construction; it was given control of the Panama Canal Zone, over which the United States exercised sovereignty. The commission reported directly to Secretary of War William Howard Taft and was directed to avoid the inefficiency and corruption that had plagued the French 15 years earlier.

On 6 May 1904, President Theodore Roosevelt appointed John Findley Wallace, formerly chief engineer and finally general manager of the Illinois Central Railroad, as chief engineer of the Panama Canal Project. Overwhelmed by the disease-plagued country and forced to use often dilapidated French infrastructure and equipment, as well as being frustrated by the overly bureaucratic ICC, Wallace resigned abruptly in June 1905. The ICC brought on a new chairman, Theodore P. Shonts, and a new chief engineer was appointed, John Frank Stevens, a self-educated engineer who had built the Great Northern Railroad who would remain in the position a mere two years. Stevens was not a member of the ICC; he increasingly viewed its bureaucracy as a serious hindrance, bypassing the commission and sending requests and demands directly to the Roosevelt administration in Washington, DC.

One of Stevens' first achievements in Panama was in building and rebuilding the housing, cafeterias, hotels, water systems, repair shops, warehouses, and other infrastructure needed by the thousands of incoming workers. Stevens began the recruitment effort to entice thousands of workers from the United States and other areas to come to the Canal Zone to work. Workers from the Caribbean – called "Afro-Panamanians" – came in large numbers and many settled permanently. Stevens tried to provide accommodation in which the workers could work and live in reasonable safety and comfort. He also re-established and enlarged the railway, which was to prove crucial in transporting millions of tons of soil from the cut through the mountains to the dam across the Chagres River.

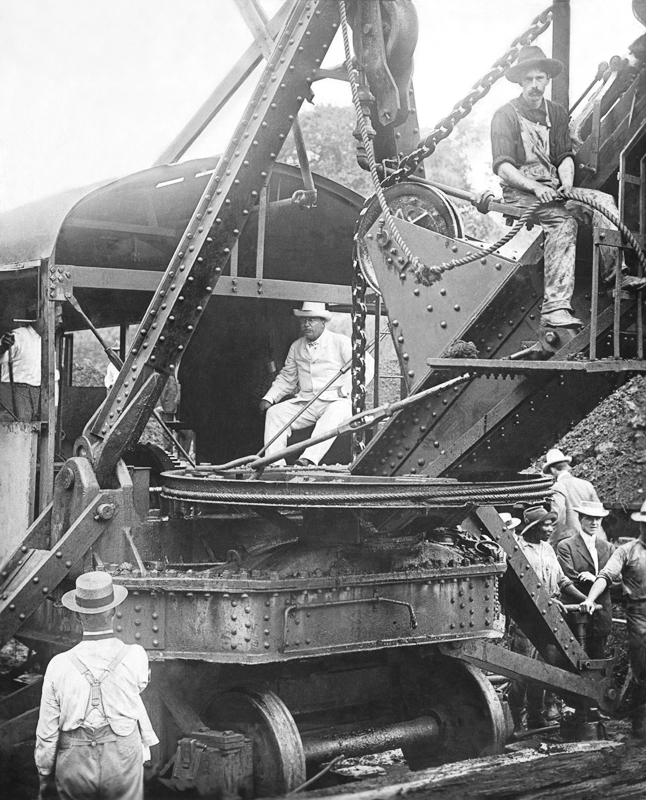
President Theodore Roosevelt sitting on a Bucyrus steam shovel at Culebra Cut, 1906

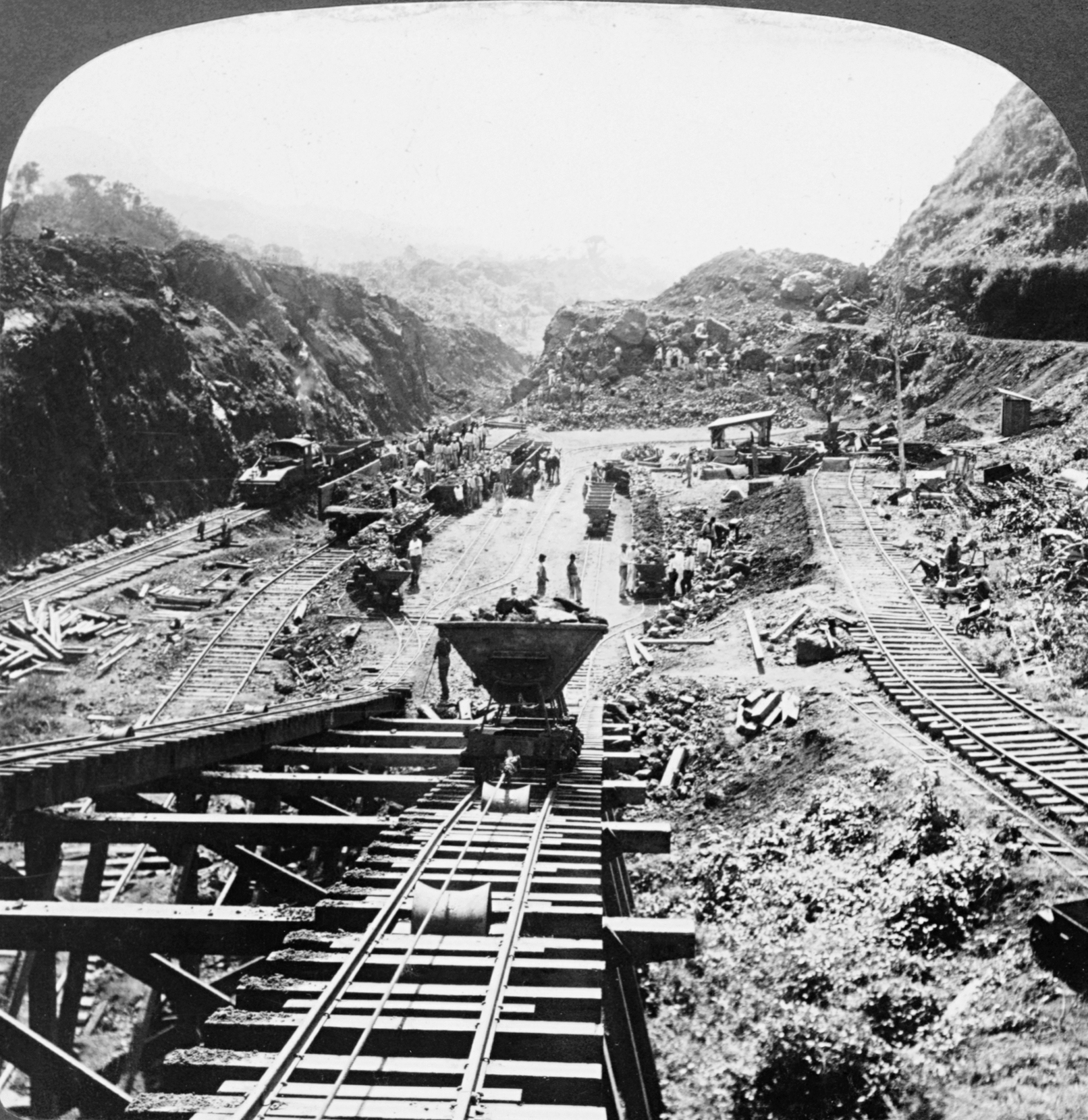
Construction work on the Gaillard Cut, 1907

Colonel William C. Gorgas had been appointed by Wallace as chief sanitation officer of the canal construction project in 1904. Gorgas implemented a range of measures to minimize the spread of deadly diseases, particularly yellow fever and malaria, which had recently been shown to be mosquito-borne following the work of Cuban epidemiologist Carlos Finlay, American pathologist Walter Reed and Scottish physician Sir Ronald Ross. Investment was made in extensive sanitation projects, including city water systems, fumigation of buildings, spraying of insect-breeding areas with oil and larvicide, installation of mosquito netting and window screens, and elimination of stagnant water. Despite opposition from the commission (one member said his ideas were barmy), Gorgas persisted, and when Stevens arrived, he threw his weight behind the project. After two years of extensive work, the mosquito-spread diseases were nearly eliminated. Despite the monumental effort, about 5,600 workers died from disease and accidents during the US construction phase of the canal. Of these, the great majority were West Indian laborers, particularly those from Barbados. The number of Americans who died was about 350.

Besides healthier and far better living conditions for the workers, another benefit given to American citizens working on the Canal was a medal for two years of service. Additional bars were added for each two-year period afterward. Designed by Victor D. Brenner and featuring the then-current president they were popularly known as The Roosevelt Medal. A total of 7,189 were ultimately issued, with a few people receiving as many as four bars.

In 1905, a US engineering panel was commissioned to review the canal design, which had not been finalized. In January 1906 the panel, in a majority of eight to five, recommended to President Roosevelt a sea-level canal, as had been attempted by the French and temporarily abandoned by them in 1887 for a ten locks system designed by Philippe Bunau-Varilla, and definitively in 1898 for a lock-and-lake canal designed by the Comité Technique of the Compagnie Nouvelle de Canal de Panama as conceptualized by Adolphe Godin de Lépinay in 1879. But in 1906 Stevens, who had seen the Chagres in full flood, was summoned to Washington; he declared a sea-level approach to be "an entirely untenable proposition". He argued in favor of a canal using a lock system to raise and lower ships from a large reservoir 85 feet (26 m) above sea level. This would create both the largest dam (Gatun Dam) and the largest human-made lake (Gatun Lake) in the world at that time. The water to refill the locks would be taken from Gatun Lake by opening and closing enormous gates and valves and letting gravity propel the water from the lake. Gatun Lake would connect to the Pacific through the mountains at the Gaillard (Culebra) Cut. Unlike Godin de Lépinay with the Congrès International d'Etudes du Canal Interocéanique, Stevens successfully convinced Roosevelt of the necessity and feasibility of this alternative scheme.

The construction of a canal with locks required the excavation of more than 17 million cubic yards (13 million cubic metres) of material over and above the 30 million cu yd (23 million m^{3}) excavated by the French. Beginning in 1905, and as quickly as possible, the Americans replaced or upgraded the old, unusable French equipment with new construction equipment that was designed for a much larger and faster scale of work. Over a hundred railroad-mounted steam shovels were purchased, 77 from Bucyrus-Erie and 25 from the Marion Power Shovel Company. These were joined by enormous steam-powered cranes, giant hydraulic rock crushers, concrete mixers, dredges, and pneumatic power drills, nearly all of which were manufactured by new, extensive machine-building technology developed and built in the United States. The railroad also had to be comprehensively upgraded with heavy-duty, double-tracked rails over most of the line to accommodate new rolling stock. In many places, the new Gatun Lake flooded over the original rail line, and a new line had to be constructed above Gatun Lake's waterline.

Between 1912 and 1914 there was a controversy about the tolls for the canal.

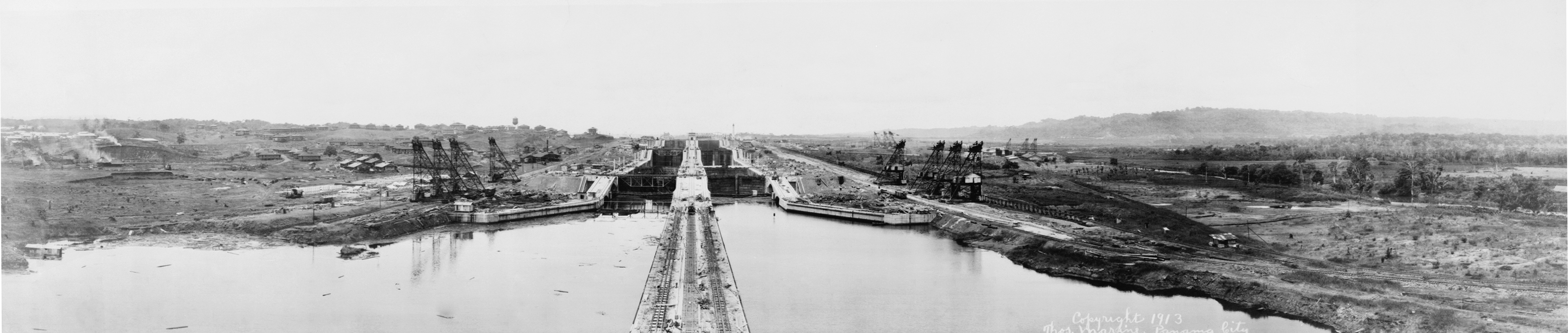
Construction of locks on the Panama Canal, 1913

=== Goethals replaces Stevens as chief engineer, 1907–1914 ===
In 1907, Stevens resigned as chief engineer. His replacement, appointed by President Theodore Roosevelt, was US Army Major George Washington Goethals of the US Army Corps of Engineers. Soon to be promoted to lieutenant colonel and later to general, he was a strong, West Point-trained leader and civil engineer with experience in canals (unlike Stevens). Goethals directed the work in Panama to a successful conclusion in 1914, two years ahead of the target date of 10 June 1916.

Goethals divided the engineering and excavation work into three divisions: Atlantic, Central, and Pacific. The Atlantic Division, under Major William L. Sibert, was responsible for construction of the massive breakwater at the entrance to Bahía Limón, the Gatun locks, and their 3 1/2-mile (5.6 km) approach channel, and the immense Gatun Dam. The Pacific Division, under Sydney B. Williamson (the only civilian member of this high-level team), was similarly responsible for the Pacific 3-mile (4.8 km) breakwater in Panama Bay, the approach channel to the locks, and the Miraflores and Pedro Miguel locks and their associated dams and reservoirs.

The Central Division, under Major David du Bose Gaillard of the United States Army Corps of Engineers, was assigned one of the most difficult parts: excavating the Culebra Cut through the continental divide to connect Gatun Lake to the Pacific Panama Canal locks.

On 10 October 1913, President Woodrow Wilson sent a signal from the White House by telegraph which triggered the explosion that destroyed the Gamboa Dike. This flooded the Culebra Cut, thereby joining the Atlantic and Pacific oceans via the Panama Canal. Alexandre La Valley (a floating crane built by Lobnitz & Company and launched in 1887) was the first self-propelled vessel to transit the canal from ocean to ocean. This vessel crossed the canal from the Atlantic in stages during construction, finally reaching the Pacific on 7 January 1914. SS Cristobal (a cargo and passenger ship built by Maryland Steel, and launched in 1902 as SS Tremont) on 3 August 1914, was the first ship to transit the canal from ocean to ocean.

The construction of the canal was completed in 1914, 401 years after Panama was first crossed overland by the Europeans in Vasco Núñez de Balboa's party of conquistadores. The United States spent almost $500 million (roughly equivalent to $16.1 billion in 2025) to finish the project. This was by far the largest American engineering project to date. The canal was formally opened on 15 August 1914, with the passage of the cargo ship SS Ancon.

The opening of the Panama Canal in 1914 caused a severe drop in traffic along Chilean ports due to shifts in maritime trade routes, despite the closure of the canal for nearly seven months after a landslide in the Culebra Cut on 18 September 1915. The burgeoning sheep farming business in southern Patagonia suffered a significant setback by the change in trade routes, as did the economy of the Falkland Islands.

Throughout this time, Ernest "Red" Hallen was hired by the Isthmian Canal Commission to document the progress of the work.

In 1914, steam shovels from the Panama Canal were purchased and put to use in Chuquicamata copper mine of northern Chile.

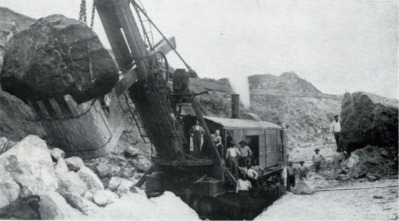
A Marion steam shovel excavating the Panama Canal, 1908

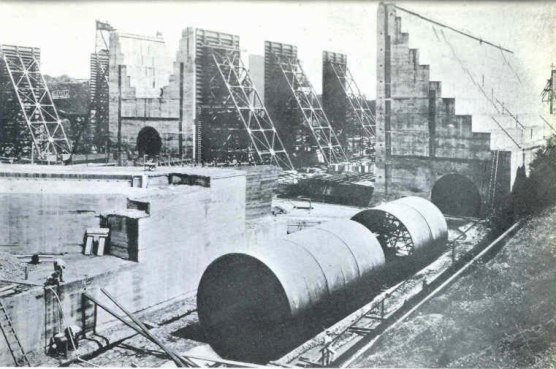
The Panama Canal locks under construction, 1910

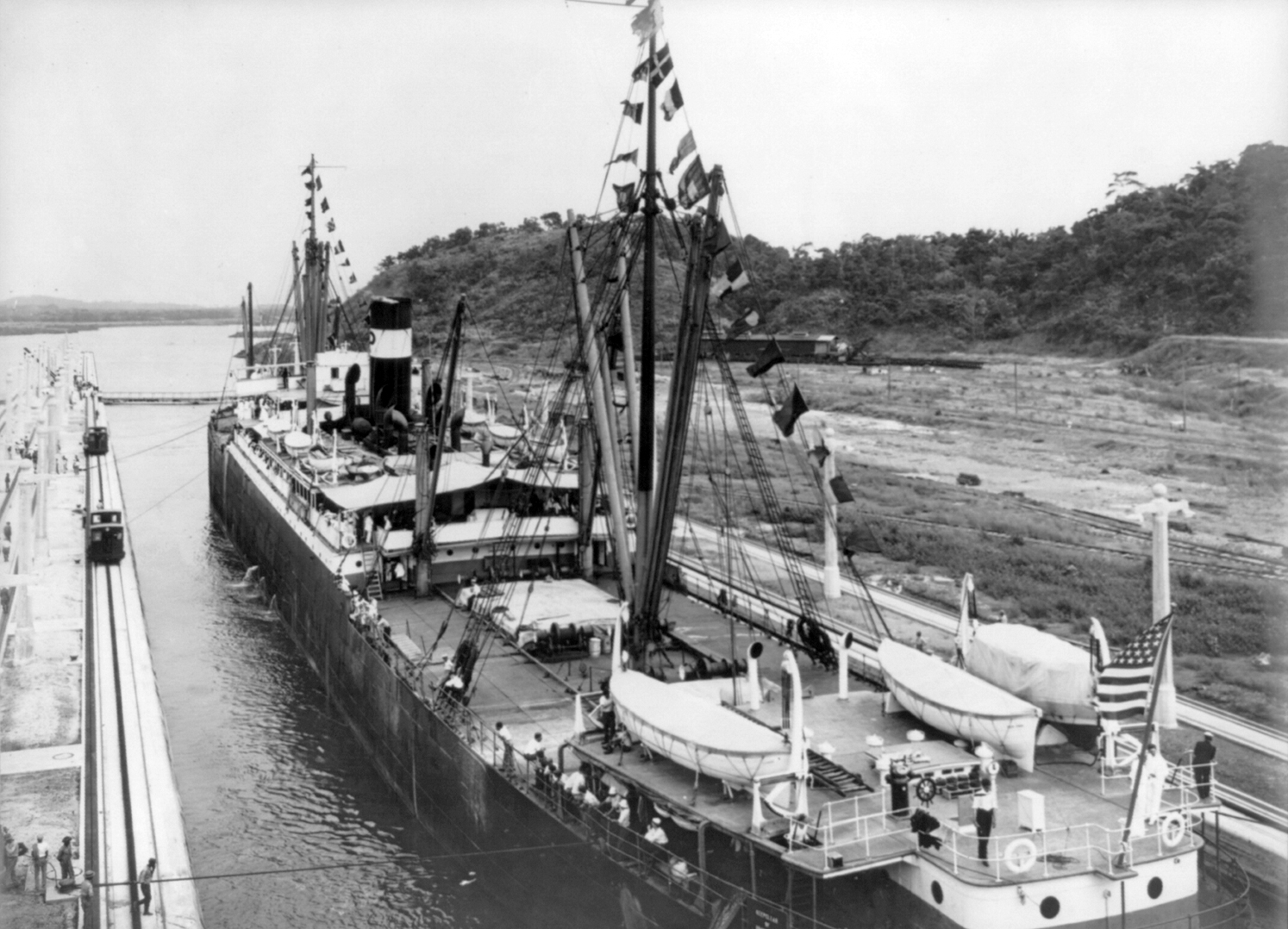
The first ship to transit the canal at the formal opening, SS Ancon, passes through on 15 August 1914.

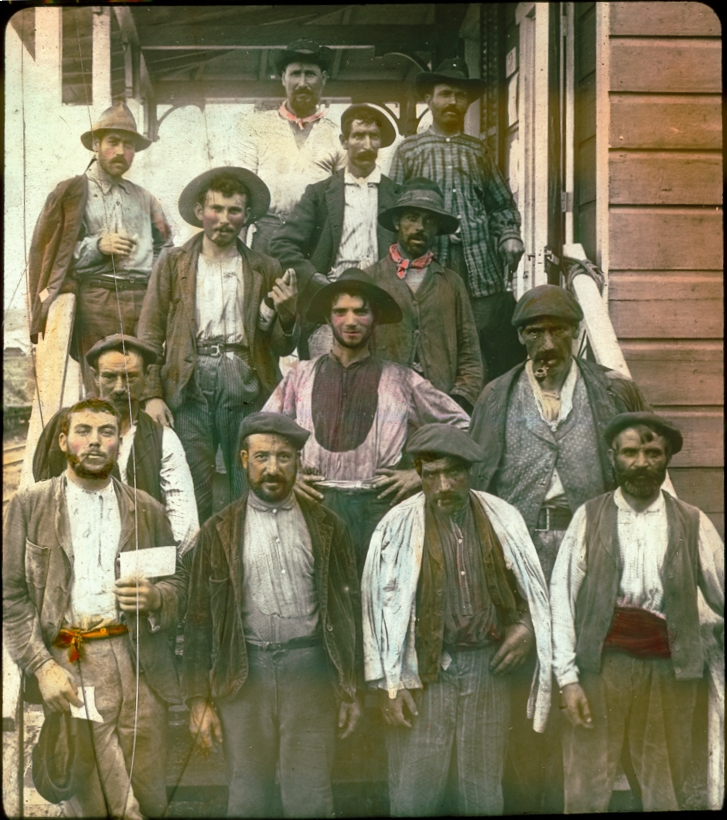
Spanish laborers working on the Panama Canal in the early 1900s

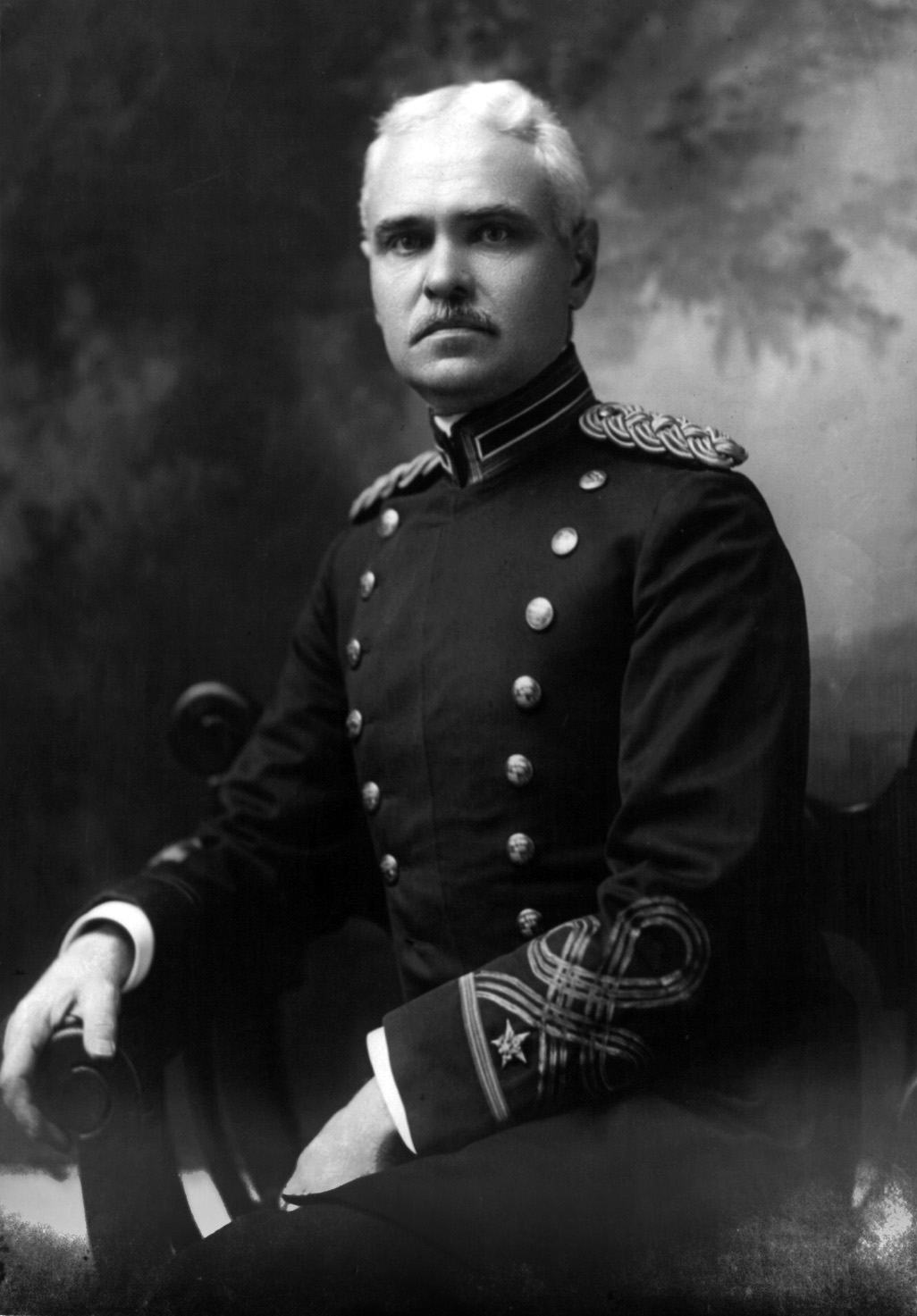
General George Washington Goethals, who completed the canal

Nautical chart of 1915 showing the canal shortly after completion

=== US control and handover to Panama, 1914–1999 ===
The Grand Panama Canal Exposition held in 1915

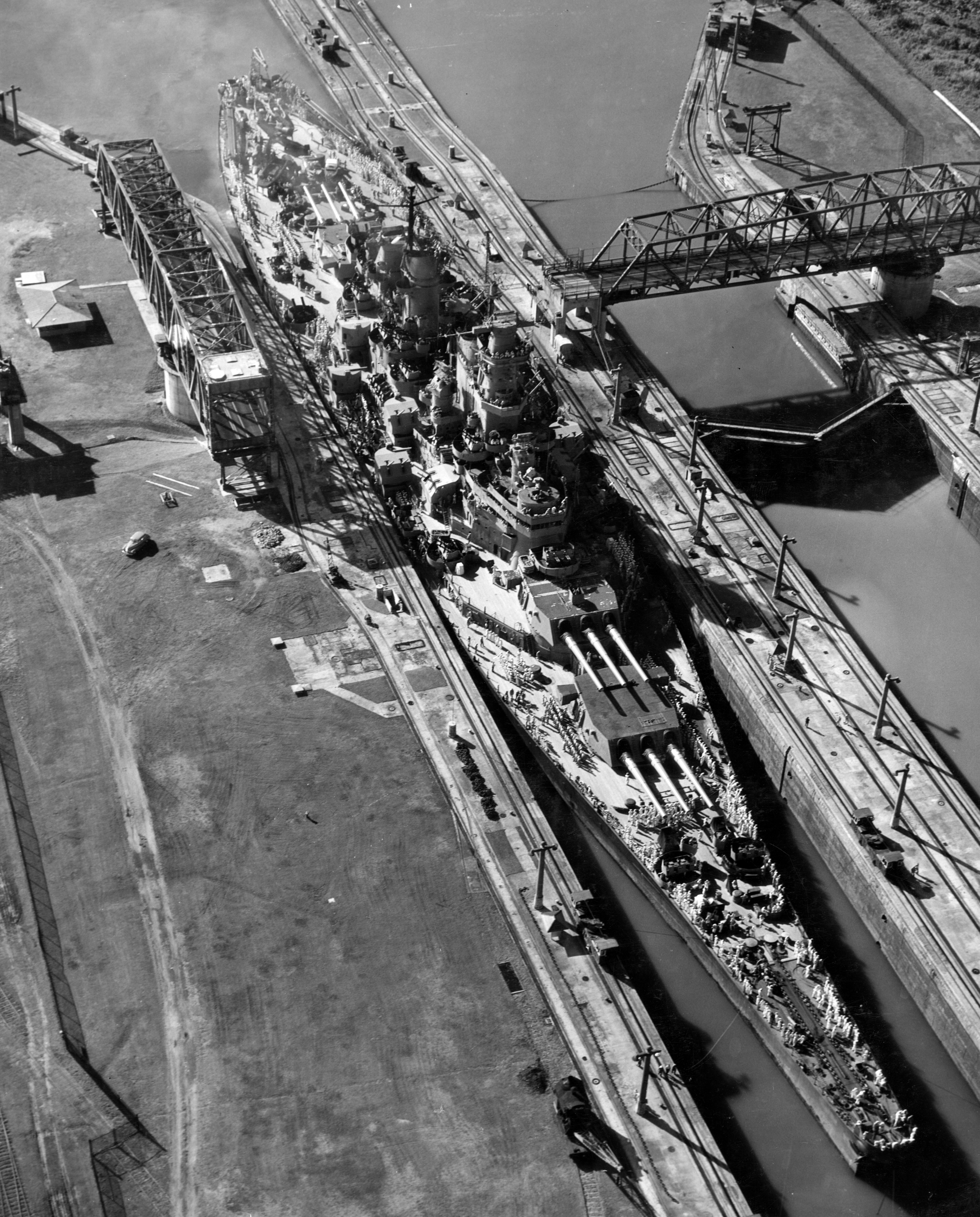
USS Missouri, an Iowa-class battleship, passes through the canal on 13 October 1945. The 108 ft 2 in (32.97 m) beams of the Iowas and preceding South Dakota class were the largest ever to transit the Canal.

The Canal began operations on 15 August, 1914. A few months later the inauguration ceremonies of the exposition occurred in San Francisco in what was called the Panama-Pacific International Exposition. The start of the ceremony of the day was described:

At precisely noon, President Wilson pressed a gold telegraph key in Washington D.C. sending a signal three thousand miles from New Jersey to an antenna atop the Tower of Jewels. The great doors to the exhibition palaces swung open and water flowed from the Fountain of Energy. Cannons boomed and the crowd cheered. The city’s return from the devastation of 1906 was complete and her grandest celebration had begun!

Speaking on the successful opening and operation of the Panama Canal, a Canal first theorized by the Conquistedors of the 16th century, Theodore Roosevelt said:

The Panama Canal was built because Colonel Goethals and the men under him, from the highest to the lowest, combined the three qualities; and it is earned on now because the administrative and judicial system represents the centralization of power in a single responsible head, who can be removed if he does wrong, but who as long as he does well has power sufficient to enable him to do the work. The professional pacifist is the most dangerous enemy of this country. He is an even more dangerous enemy than the corrupt politician, and he is a less respectable figure. The professional pacifist tries to make us believe that peace can be secured by treaties, by arbitration, by talk. The history of the world shows that peace can only be secured by a nation being prepared to defend its rights. I took the Canal Zone and let Congress debate; and while the debate goes on the Canal did also ...To take charge of the most important work under my administration, the building of the Panama Canal, I chose General Goethals. Both of his parents were born in Holland. But he was just plain United States. He wasn't a Dutch-American; if he had been I wouldn't have appointed him

By the 1930s, water supply became an issue for the canal, prompting construction of the Madden Dam across the Chagres River above Gatun Lake. Completed in 1935, the dam created Madden Lake (later Lake Alajuela), which provides additional water storage for the canal. In 1939, construction began on a further major improvement: a new set of locks large enough to carry the larger warships that the United States was building at the time and planned to continue building. The work proceeded for several years, and significant excavation was carried out on the new approach channels, but the project was canceled after World War II.

After World War II, US control of the canal and the Canal Zone surrounding it became contentious; relations between Panama and the United States became increasingly tense. Many Panamanians felt that the Zone rightfully belonged to Panama; student protests were met by the fencing-in of the zone and an increased military presence there. Demands for the United States to hand over the canal to Panama increased after the Suez Crisis in 1956, when the United States used financial and diplomatic pressure to force France and the UK to abandon their attempt to retake control of the Suez Canal, previously nationalized by the Nasser regime in Egypt. Panamanian unrest culminated in riots on Martyr's Day, 9 January 1964, when about 20 Panamanians and 3–5 US soldiers were killed.

A decade later, in 1974, negotiations toward a settlement began and resulted in the Torrijos–Carter Treaties. On 7 September 1977, the treaty was signed by President of the United States Jimmy Carter and Omar Torrijos, de facto leader of Panama. This mobilized the process of granting the Panamanians free control of the canal so long as Panama signed a treaty guaranteeing the permanent neutrality of the canal. The treaty led to full Panamanian control effective at noon on 31 December 1999, and the Panama Canal Authority (ACP) assumed command of the waterway. The Panama Canal remains one of the chief revenue sources for Panama.

Before this handover, the government of Panama held an international bid to negotiate a 25-year contract for operation of the container shipping ports located at the canal's Atlantic and Pacific outlets. The contract was not affiliated with the ACP or Panama Canal operations and was won by the firm Hutchison Whampoa, a Hong Kong–based shipping interest owned by Li Ka-shing.

=== 21st century ===
In 2015, Hutchison Whampoa merged with Cheung Kong Group and was renamed CK Hutchison Holdings.

==== Trump Administration comments and reactions ====
On 21 December 2024, then US President-elect Donald Trump asserted that the United States should retake control of the Panama Canal from Panama, claiming that the rates Panama was charging American ships were "exorbitant" and in violation of the Torrijos–Carter Treaties. The following day, he claimed that the canal was "falling into the wrong hands", referring to China. Shortly after Trump's comments, Panamanian president José Raúl Mulino responded, denying that the United States was being unfairly charged or that anyone besides Panama was in full control of the canal, and affirming that the canal was part of the country's "inalienable patrimony".

Though the Hong Kong company Hutchison Port Holdings does have a concession to operate two ports near the ends of the canal – the Balboa port on the Pacific side and the Cristóbal port on the Atlantic side – neither these ports nor the company control access to the canal. Three other ports near the canal's ends are operated by companies from Taiwan and Singapore, and joint venture from the United States and Panama. The government of Panama receives dividends from the Hutchinson concession, but the locks and Marine Traffic Control are run independently by the Panama Canal Authority, and the harbor pilots that guide ships are Panamanian.

On 24 December, a protest was held at the US Embassy in Panama City over Trump's threat to take back the Panama Canal. Protesters referred to him as a "public enemy" of Panama. On the same day, the Bolivarian Alliance for the Peoples of Our America (ALBA), made up of ten Central and South American countries, denounced Trump's comments and affirmed its support for Panama's "sovereignty, territorial integrity and self-determination."

In a 7 January 2025 press conference, Trump vowed to gain control of the Panama Canal. He refused to rule out economic and military action against Panama to seize control of the canal, to secure what he called US "economic security." He reiterated his intent to take back control of the canal in his inaugural address on 20 January.

On 5 February, the United States Department of State posted on Twitter that the Panama Canal would no longer be charging United States government vessels to cross. President Mulino called this an "intolerable" falsehood, and Secretary of State Marco Rubio (who had departed Panama a few days earlier) had to correct the announcement, saying he "expects" Panama to begin doing so in return for the Torrijos–Carter Treaties' guarantee of US military protection in the event of an attack on the canal.

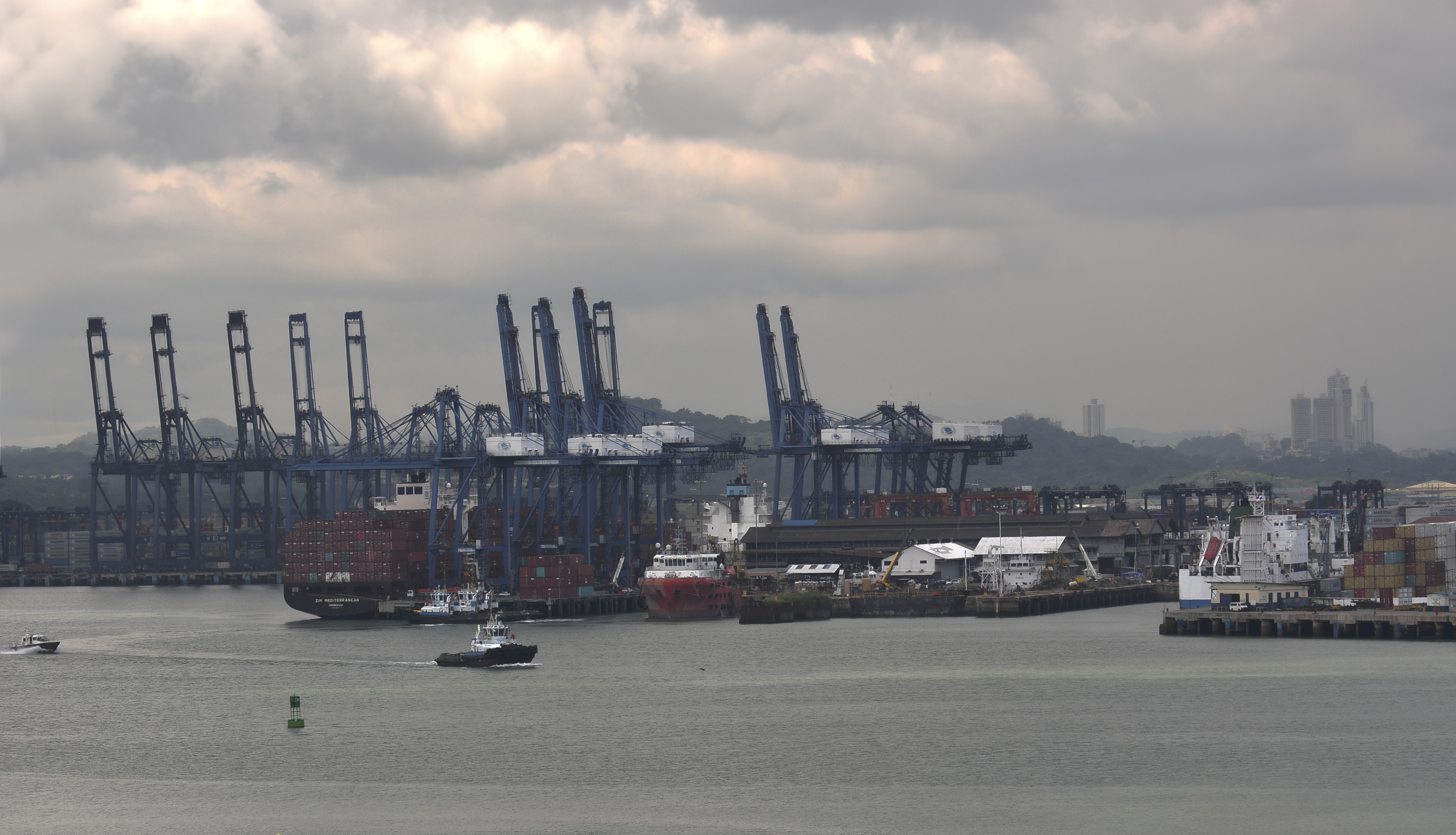
Balboa Port on the Pacific side

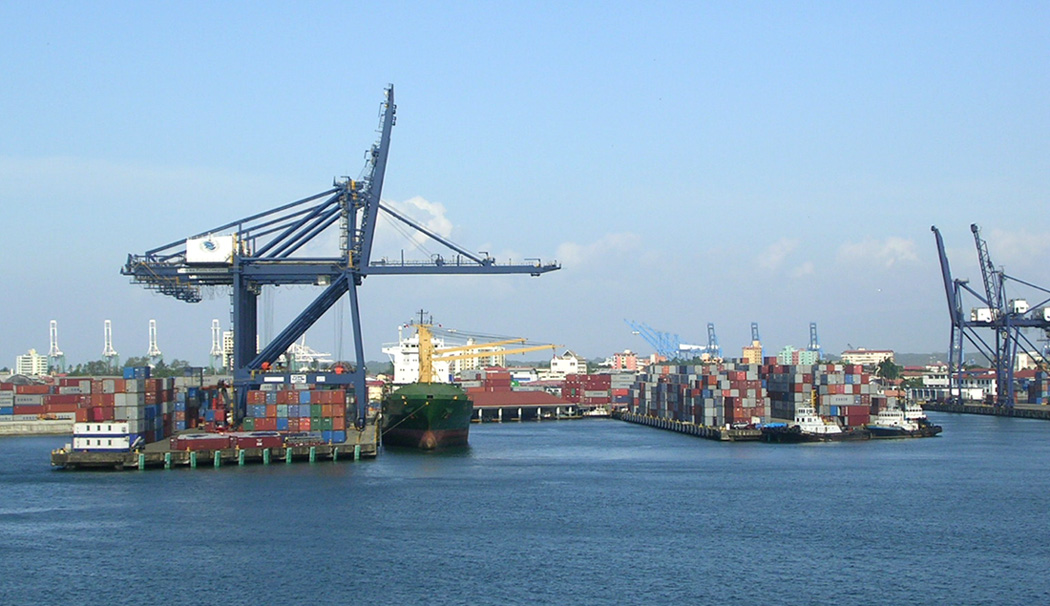
Colón Port on the Caribbean side

On 5 March 2025, the American investment company BlackRock announced that a consortium, including also Global Infrastructure Partners and Terminal Investment Limited, would buy CK Hutchison's 80% holding in Hutchison Port Holdings, which owns ports at either end of the canal. According to The New York Times, the Hong Kong-based Li family felt "under political pressure to exit the ports business"; discussions with BlackRock about the Panama Canal had begun only a few weeks prior, coinciding with the beginning of the Trump administration.

In early 2026, the Panama High Court ruled that the concessions offered to Hong Kong firm CK Hutchison Holdings were unconstitutional and cancelled their contract. Panama's government confirmed that operations at the Canal would not be affected by the decision. Around the same time, President Mulino declared the crisis with the United States to be over, stating that "Panama moved toward a relationship of respect, restored trust, joint work, and friendship, and the canal remained Panamanian." On 23 February 2026, the Panama Maritime Authority took over the operations of the ports of Balboa and Cristobal. According to reports, following the Iran war, the canal saw a traffic increase of up to 10%, due to the crisis in the Middle East. The most notable aspect was the liquefied natural gas (LNG) carriers transporting energy exports from the United States to Asia.

== Canal ==
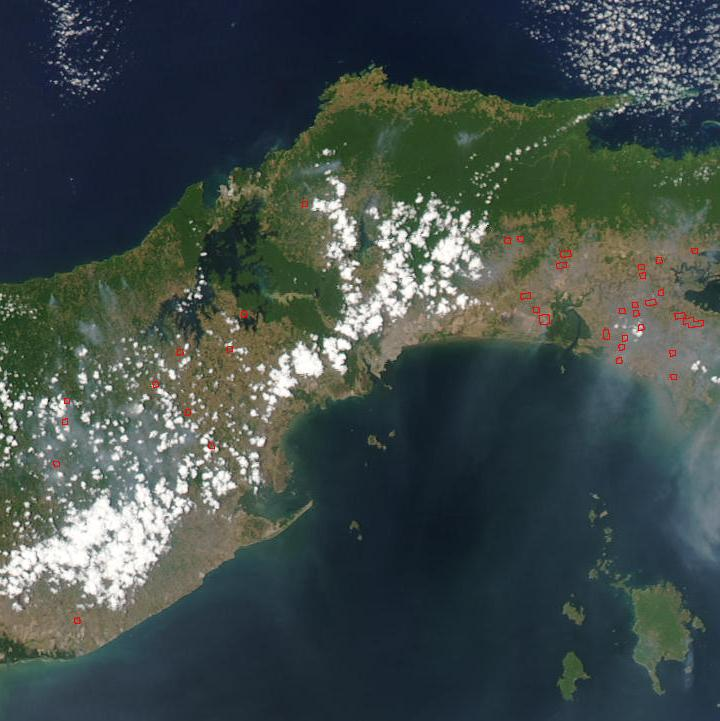
A satellite image showing the location of the Panama Canal: dense jungles are visible in green, topped by clouds

=== Layout ===
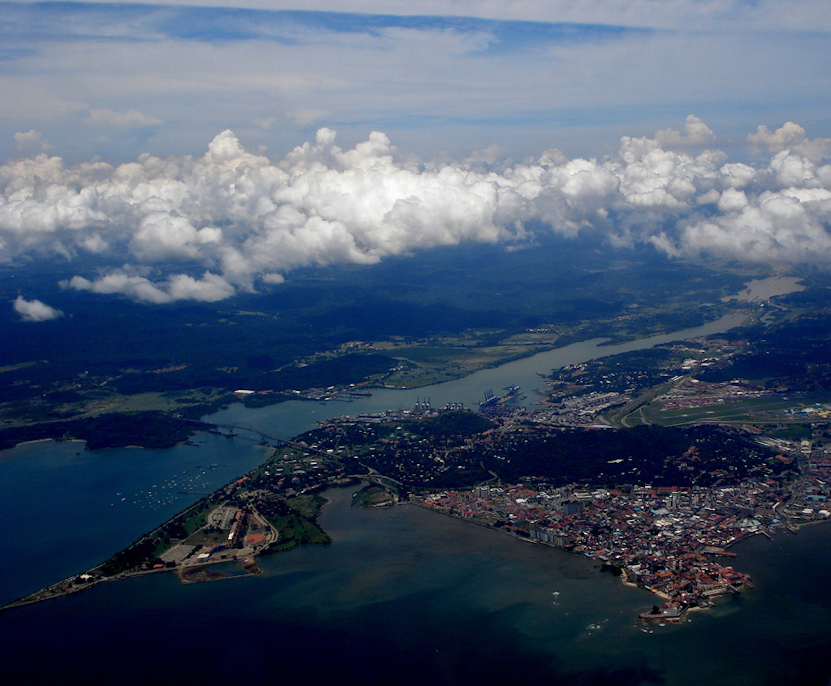
Pacific-side entrance

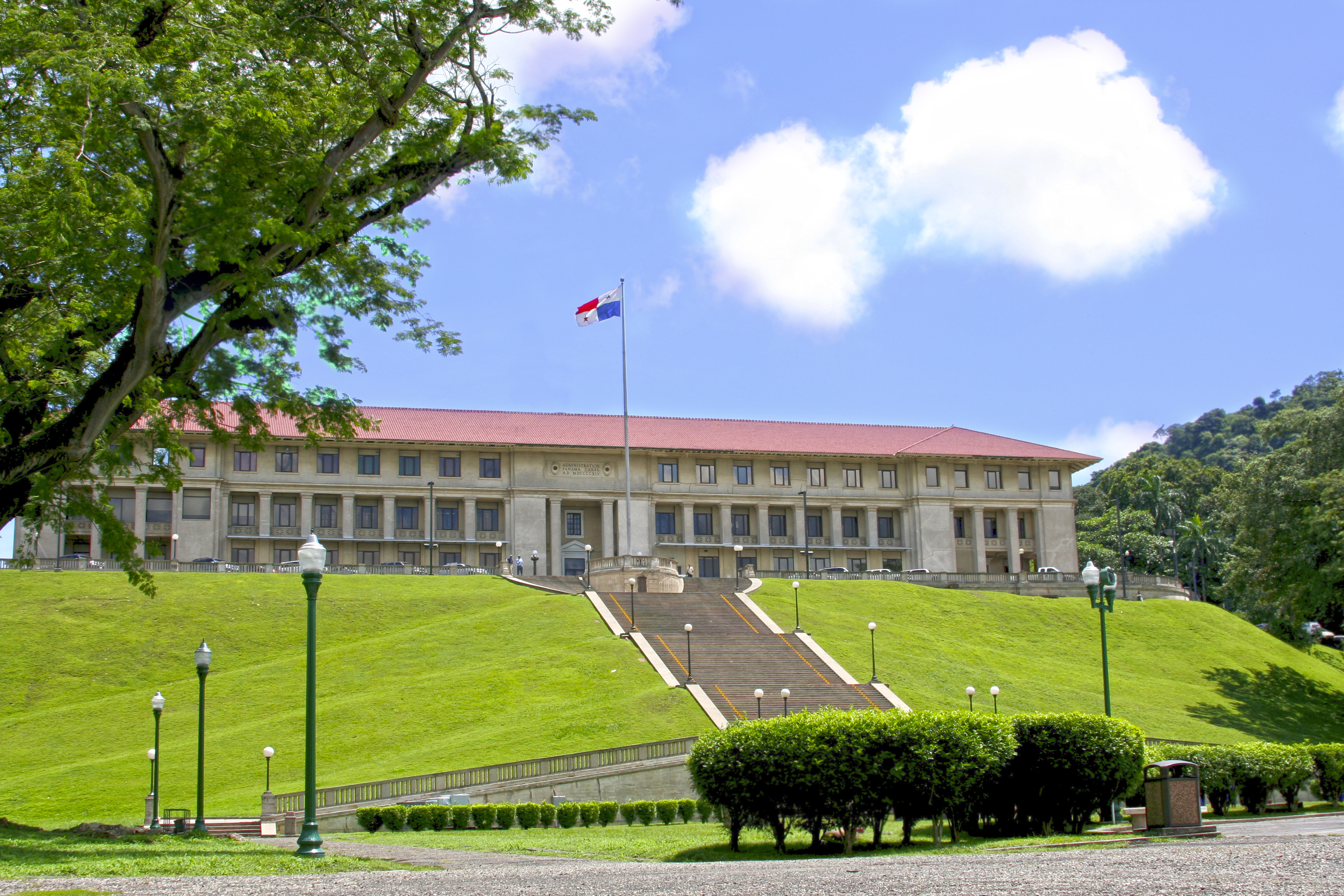
Administration building

While globally the Atlantic Ocean is east of the isthmus and the Pacific is west, the general direction of the canal passage from the Atlantic to the Pacific is from northwest to southeast, because of the shape of the isthmus at the point the canal occupies. The Bridge of the Americas (Spanish: Puente de las Américas) at the Pacific side is about a third of a degree east of the Colón end on the Atlantic side. In formal nautical communications, the simplified directions "southbound" and "northbound" are used.

The canal consists of artificial lakes, several improved and artificial channels, and multiple sets of locks. The original locks take ships up to panamax size and the new expansion locks up to neopanamax size. An additional artificial lake, Alajuela Lake (known during the American administration as Madden Lake), acts as a reservoir for the canal. The layout of the canal as seen by a ship passing from the Atlantic to the Pacific is:

- From the formal marking line of the Atlantic Entrance, one enters Limón Bay (Bahía Limón), a large natural harbor. The entrance runs 8.9 km (5 1/2 mi). It provides a deepwater port (Cristóbal), with facilities like multimodal cargo exchange (to and from train) and the Colón Free Trade Zone (a free port).
- A 3.2 km (2 mi) channel forms the approach to the locks from the Atlantic side.
- The Gatun Locks (Panamax) or the Agua Clara Locks (NeoPanamax) are three-stage flight of locks 2.0 km (1 1/4 mi) long, that lift ships to the Gatun Lake level, some 27 m (87 ft) above sea level.
- Gatun Lake, an artificial lake formed by the building of the Gatun Dam, carries vessels 24 km (15 mi) across the isthmus. It is the summit canal stretch, fed by the Gatun River and emptied by basic lock operations. From the lake, the Chagres River, a natural waterway enhanced by the damming of Gatun Lake, runs about 8.4 km (5 1/4 mi). Here the upper Chagres River feeds the high-level-canal stretch.
- The Culebra Cut slices 12.5 km (7 3/4 mi) through the mountain ridge, crosses the continental divide and passes under the Centennial Bridge. The route then splits depending on the size of the ship.
- For Panamax ships, the single-stage Pedro Miguel Lock, which is 1.4 km (7/8 mi) long, is the first part of the descent with a lift of 9.4 m (31 ft). Panamax ships then proceed through the artificial Miraflores Lake 1.8 km (1 1/8 mi) long, and 16 m (54 ft) above sea level before reaching the two-stage Miraflores Locks. These are 1.8 km (1 1/8 mi) long, with a total descent of 16 m (54 ft) at mid-tide.
- For Neopanamax ships, there is only one set of locks, these are the Cocoli locks which are three-stage flight of locks.
- From the Miraflores or Cocoli Locks, the ship reaches Balboa harbor, again with multimodal exchange provision (here the railway meets the shipping route again) along with several large container terminals. Nearby is Panama City.
- From this harbor an entrance/exit channel leads to the Pacific Ocean (Gulf of Panama), 13.3 km (8 1/4 mi) from the Miraflores Locks, passing under the Bridge of the Americas at Balboa, near Panama City.

Thus, the total length of the canal is 80 km (50 mi). In 2017 it took ships an average of 11.38 hours to pass between the canal's two outer locks.

=== Navigation ===
Point	Coordinates (links to map and photo sources)	Notes
Atlantic Entrance	9.38743°N 79.91863°W	
Gatún Locks	9.27215°N 79.92266°W	
Trinidad Turn	9.20996°N 79.92408°W	In "The Cut"
Bohío Turn	9.17831°N 79.86667°W	In "The Cut"
Orchid Turn	9.18406°N 79.84513°W	In "The Cut"
Frijoles Turn	9.15904°N 79.81362°W	In "The Cut"
Barbacoa Turn	9.12053°N 79.80395°W	In "The Cut"
Mamei Turn	9.11161°N 79.76856°W	In "The Cut"
Gamboa Reach	9.11774°N 79.72257°W	
Bas Obispo Reach	9.09621°N 79.68446°W	
Las Cascadas Reach	9.07675°N 79.67492°W	
Empire Reach	9.06104°N 79.66309°W	
Culebra Reach	9.04745°N 79.65017°W	
Cucaracha Reach	9.03371°N 79.63736°W	
Paraiso Reach	9.02573°N 79.62492°W	
Pedro Miguel Locks	9.01698°N 79.61281°W	
Miraflores Lake	9.00741°N 79.60254°W	
Miraflores Locks	8.99679°N 79.59182°W	
Balboa Reach	8.97281°N 79.57771°W	
Pacific Entrance	8.88846°N 79.52145°W	

=== Gatun Lake ===
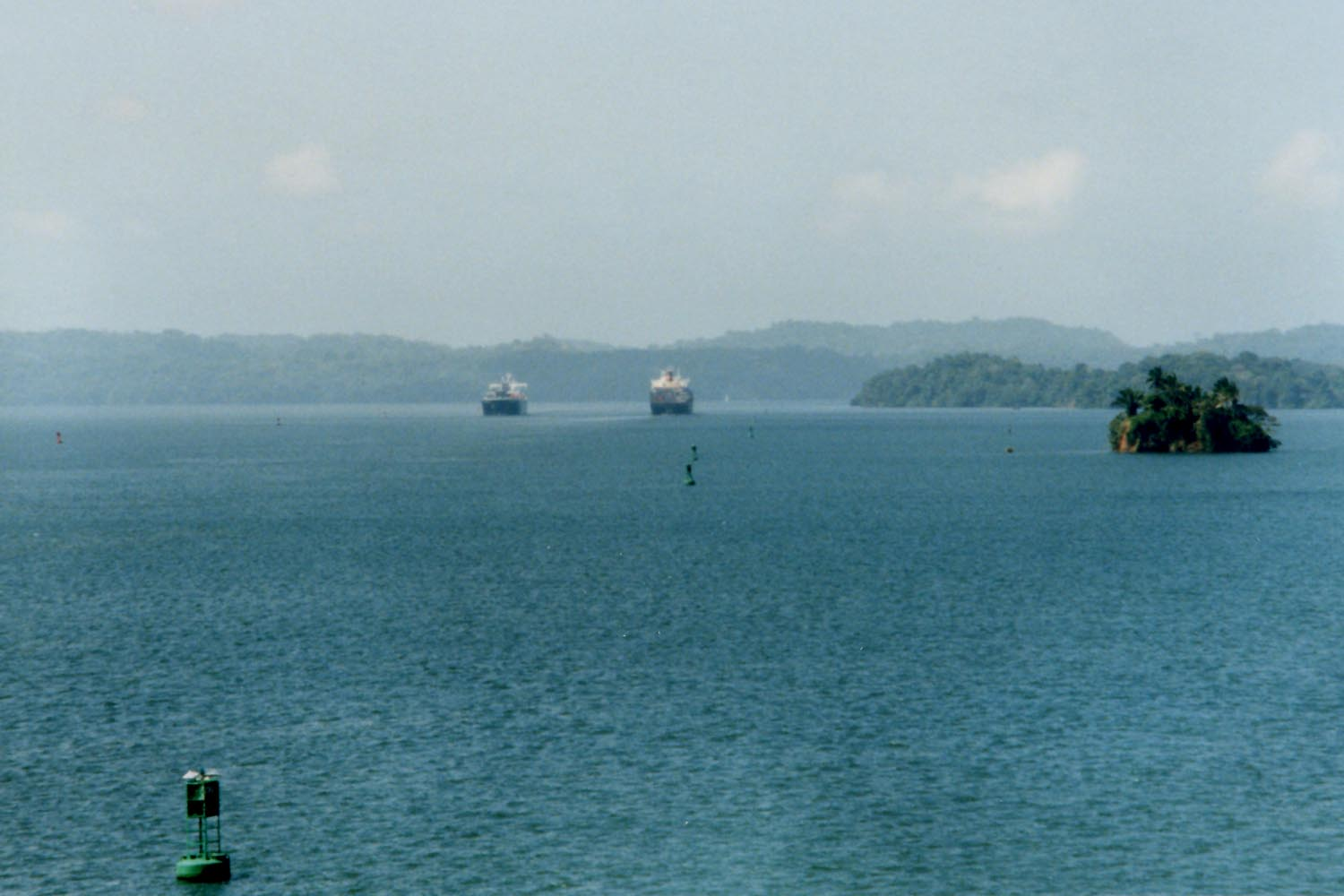
Gatun Lake provides the water used to raise and lower vessels in the Canal, gravity-fed into each set of locks.

Created in 1913 by damming the Chagres River, the Gatun Lake is a key part of the Panama Canal, providing the millions of liters of water necessary to operate its locks each time a ship passes through. At time of formation, Gatun Lake was the largest human-made lake in the world.

=== Lock size ===
Because of the importance of the canal to international trade, many ships are built to the maximum size allowed.

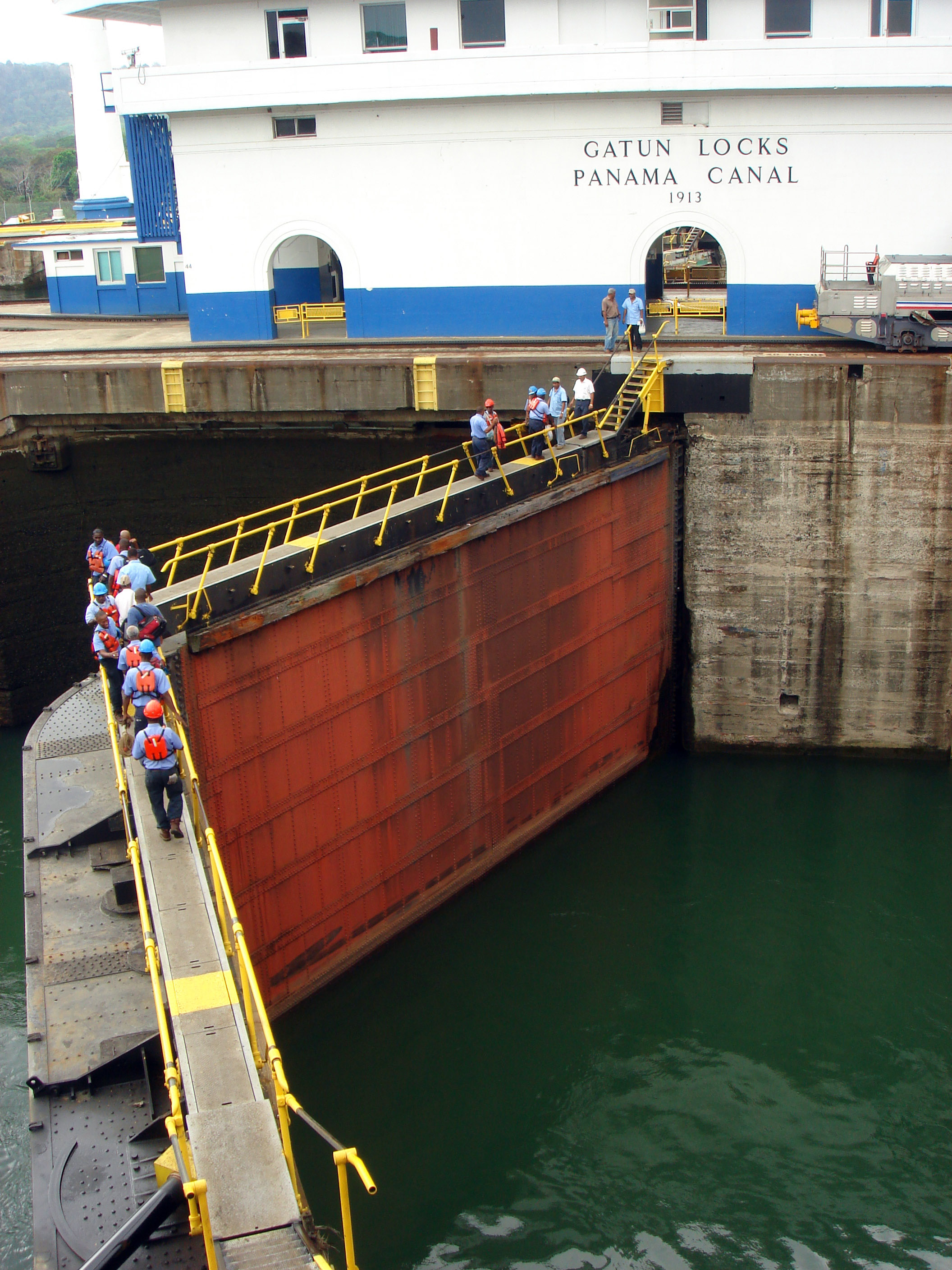
The miter lock gate at Gatún

For its first century, the width and length of ships that may transit the canal was limited by the Pedro Miguel Locks; their draft by the canal's minimum 12.6 m (41.2 ft) depth; and their height by the main span of the Bridge of the Americas at Balboa. Ships built to those limits are known as Panamax vessels. A Panamax cargo ship typically has a deadweight tonnage (DWT) of 65,000–80,000 tons, but its actual cargo is restricted to about 52,500 tons because of the canal's draft restrictions within the canal. The longest ship ever to transit the canal was the San Juan Prospector (now Marcona Prospector), an ore-bulk-oil carrier that is 296.57 m (973 ft) long with a beam of 32.31 m (106 ft).

Initially the locks at Gatun were designed to be 28.5 m (94 ft) wide. In 1908, the United States Navy requested that the width be increased to at least 36 m (118 ft) to allow the passage of large warships. A compromise was made and the locks were built 33.53 m (110.0 ft) wide. Each lock is 320 m (1,050 ft) long, with the walls ranging in thickness from 15 m (49 ft) at the base to 3 m (9.8 ft) at the top. The central wall between the parallel locks at Gatun is 18 m (59 ft) thick and over 24 m (79 ft) high. The steel lock gates measure an average of 2 m (6.6 ft) thick, 19.5 m (64 ft) wide, and 20 m (66 ft) high.

Panama Canal pilots were initially unprepared to handle the flight decks of aircraft carriers, which protrude beyond the hull on either side of the ship. When USS Saratoga made her first trip through the Gatun Locks in 1928, the ship knocked over all the concrete lamp posts along the canal.

In 2016, a decade-long expansion project created larger locks, allowing bigger ships to transit through deeper and wider channels. The allowed dimensions of ships using these locks increased by 25 percent in length, 51 percent in beam, and 26 percent in draft, as defined by Neopanamax metrics.

=== Tolls ===
As with a toll road, vessels transiting the canal must pay tolls. Tolls for the canal are set by the Panama Canal Authority and are based on vessel type, size, and the type of cargo.

For container ships, the toll is assessed on the ship's capacity expressed in twenty-foot equivalent units (TEUs), one TEU being the size of a standard intermodal shipping container. Effective 1 April 2016, this toll went from US$74 per loaded container to $60 per TEU capacity plus $30 per loaded container for a potential $90 per TEU when the ship is full. A Panamax container ship may carry up to 4,400 TEU. The toll is calculated differently for passenger ships and for container ships carrying no cargo ("in ballast"). As of April 1, 2016, the ballast rate is US$60, down from US$65.60 per TEU.

Passenger vessels in excess of 30,000 tons (PC/UMS) pay a rate based on the number of berths, that is, the number of passengers that can be accommodated in permanent beds. Since 1 April 2016, the per-berth charge is $111 for unoccupied berths and $138 for occupied berths in the Panamax locks. Starting in 2007, this fee has greatly increased the tolls for such ships. Passenger vessels of less than 30,000 tons or less than 33 tons per passenger are charged according to the same per-ton schedule as are freighters. Almost all major cruise ships have more than 33 tons per passenger; the rule of thumb for cruise line comfort is generally given as a minimum of 40 tons per passenger.

Most other types of vessels pay a toll per PC/UMS net ton, in which one "ton" is actually a volume of 100 cubic feet (2.83 m^{3}). (The calculation of tonnage for commercial vessels is quite complex.) As of fiscal year 2016, this toll is US$5.25 per ton for the first 10,000 tons, US$5.14 per ton for the next 10,000 tons, and US$5.06 per ton thereafter. As with container ships, reduced tolls are charged for freight ships "in ballast", $4.19, $4.12, $4.05 respectively.

In April 2016, a more complicated toll system was introduced, having the neopanamax locks at a higher rate in some cases, natural gas transport as a new separate category and other changes. In October 2017, there were modified tolls and categories of tolls in effect. Small (less than 125 ft) vessels up to 583 PC/UMS net tons when carrying passengers or cargo, or up to 735 PC/UMS net tons when in ballast, or up to 1,048 fully loaded displacement tons, are assessed minimum tolls based upon their length overall, according to the following table, from April 2015:

Length of vessel	Toll
Up to 15.240 m (50 ft)	US$800
From 15.240 to 24.384 m (50 to 80 ft)	US$1,300
From 24.384 to 30.480 m (80 to 100 ft)	US$2,000
More than 30.480 m (100 ft)	US$3,200
INTRA MARITIME CLUSTER – Local Tourism; More than 24.384 m (80 ft)	US$2,000 plus $72/TEU

Morgan Adams of Los Angeles, California, was the first toll received by the US government for the use of the Panama Canal by a pleasure boat. His boat Lasata passed through the Zone on 14 August 1914. The crossing occurred during a 10,000-kilometer (6,000-mile) sea voyage from Jacksonville, Florida, to Los Angeles in 1914.

The most expensive regular toll for canal passage to date was charged in April 2010, to the cruise ship Norwegian Pearl, which paid US$375,600. The average toll is around US$54,000. The highest fee for priority passage charged through the Transit Slot Auction System was US$220,300, paid in August 2006, by the Panamax tanker Erikoussa, bypassing a 90-ship queue waiting for the end of maintenance work on the Gatun Locks, and avoiding a seven-day delay. The normal fee would have been US$13,430.

In August 2026, South Korean company SK Gas paid a record US$5.3 million in an auction for priority passage through the Panama Canal for the LPG tanker G. Spirit. The vessel was scheduled to transit the canal on 1 September, 2026. The record payment came amid increased demand for transit slots and restrictions on vessel traffic associated with drought conditions and El Niño.

The lowest toll ever paid was 36 cents, equivalent to $6.75 in 2025, by American Richard Halliburton who swam the Panama Canal in 1928.

== Issues leading to expansion ==
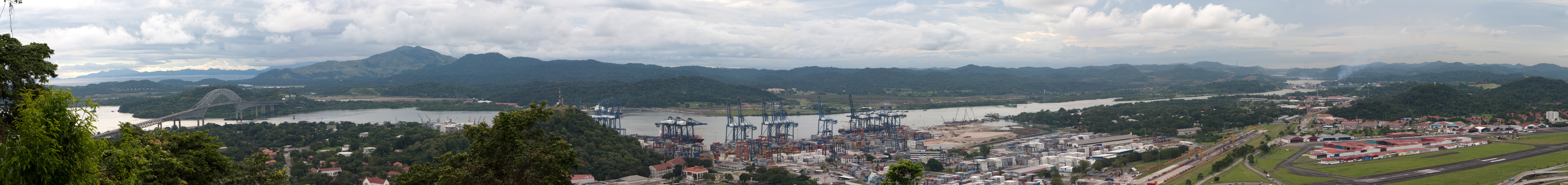
A panorama of the Pacific entrance of the canal. Left: Pacific Ocean and Puente de las Americas (Bridge of Pan-American Highway). Far right: The Miraflores locks. Foreground far right: Albrook "Marcos A. Gelabert" International Airport.

=== Efficiency and maintenance ===
Opponents to the 1977 Torrijos–Carter Treaties feared that efficiency and maintenance would suffer following the US withdrawal from the Panama Canal Zone; however, this has been proven not to be the case. In 2004, it was reported that canal operations, capitalizing on practices developed during the American administration, were improving under Panamanian control. Canal Waters Time (CWT), the average time it takes a vessel to navigate the canal, including waiting time, is a key measure of efficiency; in the first decade of the 2000s, it ranged between 20 and 30 hours, according to the ACP. The accident rate has also not changed appreciably in the past decade, varying between 10 and 30 accidents each year from about 14,000 total annual transits. An official accident is one in which a formal investigation is requested and conducted.

Increasing volumes of imports from Asia, which previously landed on US West Coast ports, are now passing through the canal to the American East Coast. In 2007, the total number of ocean-going transits increased from 11,725 in 2003 to 13,233, falling to 12,855 in 2009. The canal's fiscal year runs from October to September. This has been coupled with a steady rise in average ship size and in the numbers of Panamax vessels passing through the canal. The total tonnage carried rose from 227.9 million PC/UMS tons in fiscal year 1999 to a then record high of 312.9 million tons in 2007, and falling to 299.1 million tons in 2009. Tonnage for fiscal 2013, 2014 and 2015 was 320.6, 326.8 and 340.8 million PC/UMS tons, carried on 13,660, 13,481 and 13,874 transits respectively.

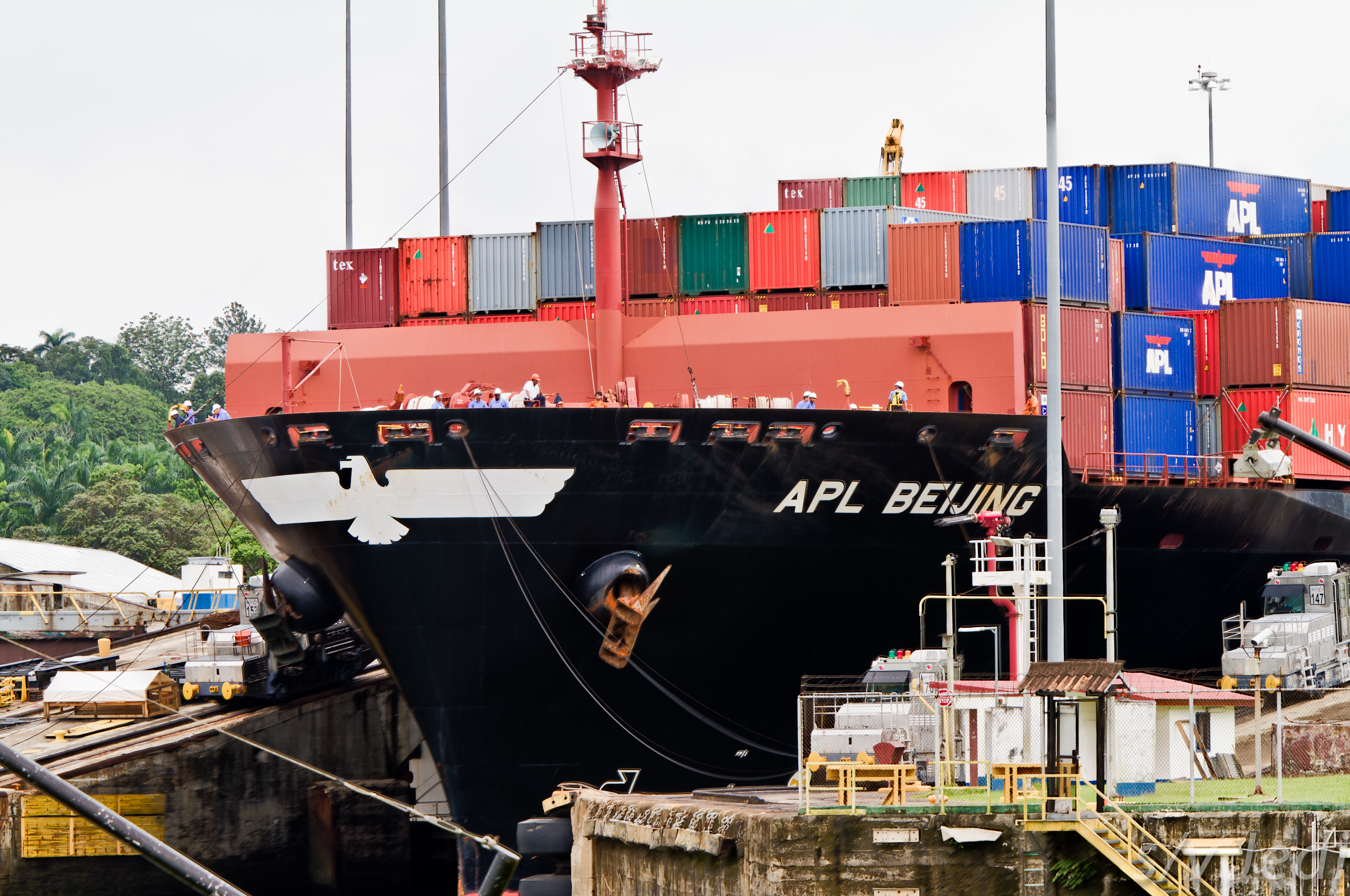
Gatun locks showing the "mule" locomotives at work

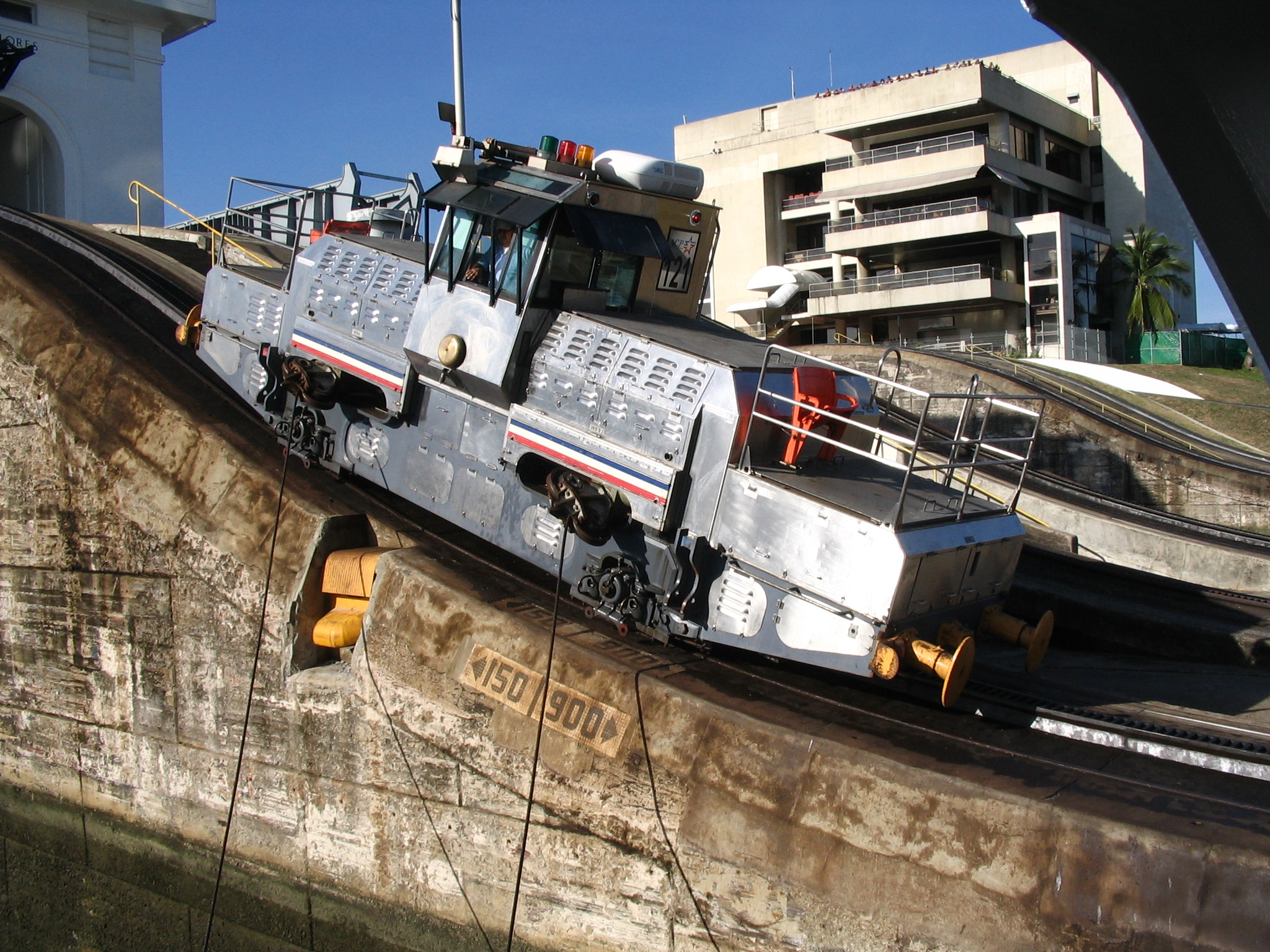
Mule in the Miraflores Locks

In the first decade after the transfer to Panamanian control, the Panama Canal Authority (ACP) invested nearly US$1 billion in widening and modernizing the canal, with the aim of increasing capacity by 20 percent. The ACP cites a number of major improvements, including the widening and straightening of the Culebra Cut to reduce restrictions on passing vessels, the deepening of the navigational channel in Gatun Lake to reduce draft restrictions and improve water supply, and the deepening of the Atlantic and Pacific entrances to the canal.

This is supported by new equipment, such as a new drill barge and suction dredger, and an increase of the tug boat fleet by 20 percent. Improvements have been made to the canal's operating machinery, including an increased and improved tug locomotive fleet, the replacement of more than 16 km (10 mi) of locomotive track, and new lock machinery controls. Improvements have been made to the traffic management system to allow more efficient control over ships in the canal.

In December 2010, record-breaking rains caused a 17-hour closure of the canal. This was the first closure since the US invasion of Panama in 1989. The rains also caused an access road to the Centenario Bridge to collapse.

=== Capacity ===
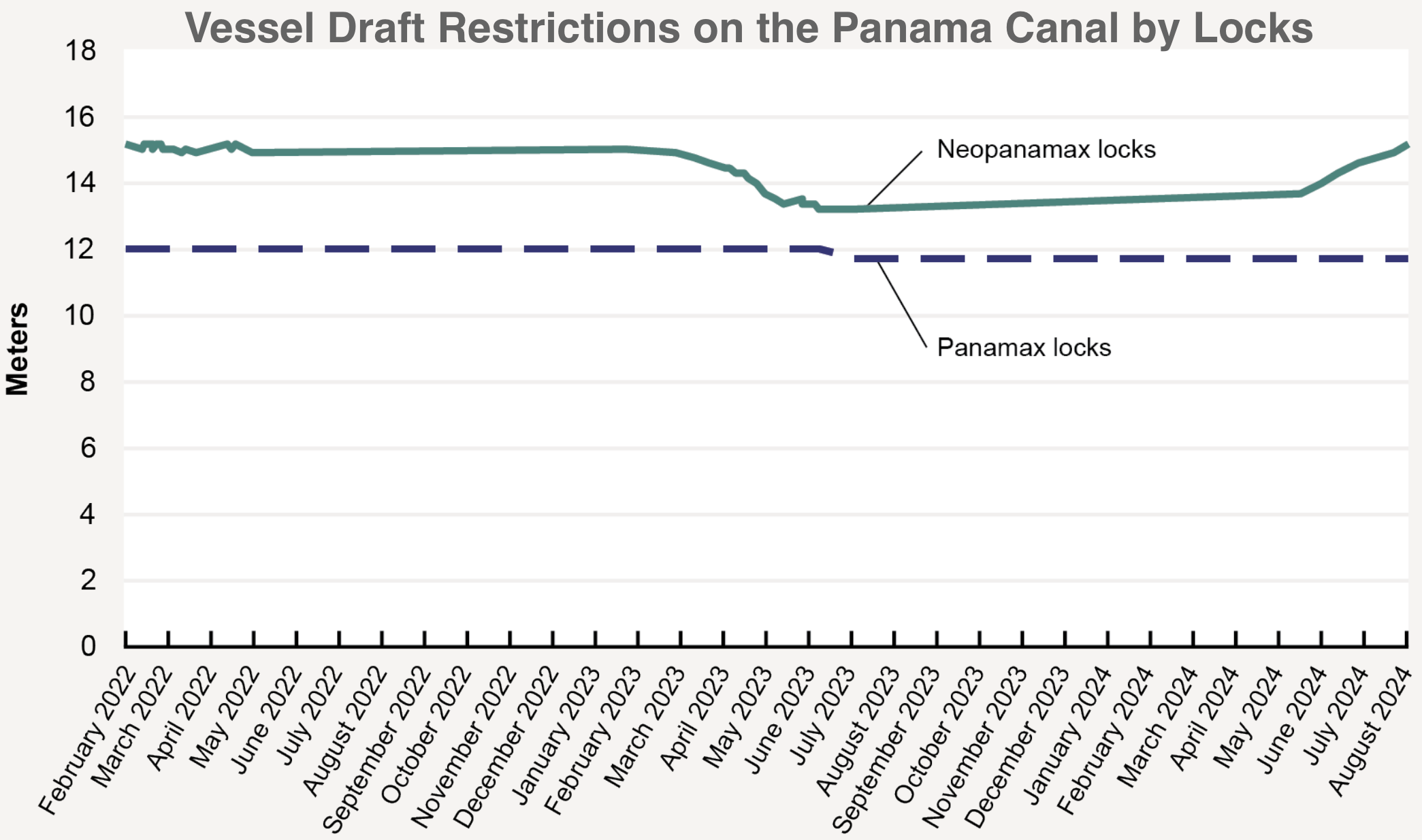
Vessel draft restrictions on the Panama Canal by locks 2022–2024 Neopanamax Panamax

The canal now handles more vessel traffic than had ever been envisioned by its builders. In 1934, it was estimated that the maximum capacity of the canal would be around 80 million tons per year. In 2015, canal traffic reached 340.8 million tons of shipping.

To increase capacity, a number of improvements have been made to maximize the use of the locking system:

- Implementation of an enhanced locks lighting system;
- Construction of two tie-up stations in Culebra Cut;
- Widening Culebra Cut from 192 to 218 m (630 to 715 ft);
- Improvements to the tugboat fleet;
- Implementation of the carousel lockage system in Gatun locks;
- Development of an improved vessel scheduling system;
- Deepening of Gatun Lake navigational channels from 10.4 to 11.3 m (34 to 37 ft) PLD;
- Modification of all locks structures to allow an additional draft of about 0.30 m (1 ft);
- Deepening of the Pacific and Atlantic entrances;
- Construction of a new spillway in Gatun, for flood control.

These improvements enlarged the capacity from 300 million PCUMS in 2008, to 340 PCUMS in 2012. These improvements were started before the new locks project, and are complementary to it.

=== Competition ===
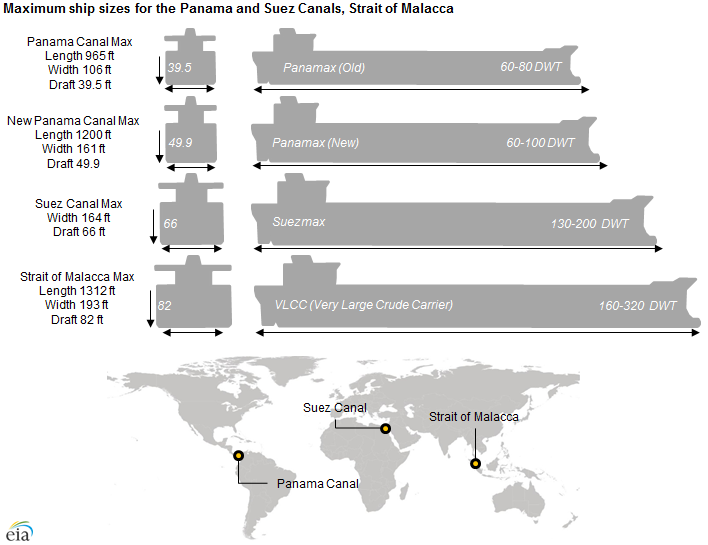
Maximum ship sizes for the Panama and Suez canals, as well as the Strait of Malacca

The canal faces increasing competition from other quarters. Because canal tolls have risen as ships have become larger, some critics have suggested that the Suez Canal is now a viable alternative for cargo between Asia and the US East Coast. The Panama Canal, however, continues to serve more than 144 of the world's trade routes and the majority of canal traffic comes from the "all-water route" from Asia to the US East and Gulf Coasts.

An alternative route through Nicaragua and Lake Nicaragua has been proposed. On 15 June 2013, Nicaragua awarded the Hong Kong-based HKND Group a 50-year concession to develop a canal through the country. In February 2018, analysts widely viewed the project as defunct, though the head of the project insisted work was on-going. In April 2018 HKND Group closed its offices, leaving no forwarding address or telephone numbers to be reached.

The increasing rate of melting of ice in the Arctic Ocean has led to speculation that the Northwest Passage or Arctic Bridge may become viable for commercial shipping. This route would save 9,300 km (5,800 mi) on the route from Asia to Europe compared with the Panama Canal, possibly leading to a diversion of some traffic to that route. However, such a route is beset by unresolved territorial issues and would still hold significant problems owing to ice.

=== Trade and Economic Impact of the Panama Canal ===
The Panama Canal has been a vital conduit for global trade since its completion in 1914. By linking the Atlantic Ocean and Pacific Ocean, the canal has significantly reduced maritime travel time and costs, facilitating economic growth and international commerce. Over the past century, the canal has evolved through expansions and policy changes, further strengthening its role in global trade networks. It is an integral part of the global maritime transportation network.

The expansion of the Panama Canal, completed in 2016, allowed for the transit of larger Neopanamax ships, nearly tripling its previous capacity. This development had a profound impact on global trade routes, particularly for container ships, liquefied natural gas (LNG) carriers, and bulk commodities. By accommodating larger vessels, the canal has helped reduce transportation costs for major exporters such as the United States, China, and Japan. Additionally, it has shifted trade dynamics by increasing the viability of East Coast ports in the United States, which have experienced higher traffic as a result of the expansion.

The Panama Canal plays a central role in global commerce. Over 5% of world trade passes through the canal annually, with key commodities including grain, petroleum products, and manufactured goods. The canal is particularly essential for trade between Asia and the Americas, serving as a crucial transit route for all cargoes, including automobiles, consumer electronics, and raw materials. The economic benefits of the canal extend beyond global trade, significantly impacting the Panamanian economy. The Panama Canal Authority (ACP) generates substantial revenue through tolls and fees, contributing to Panama’s GDP growth and infrastructure development. Since the canal’s transfer from the United States to Panama in 1999, revenues have been reinvested into national development projects, including ports, logistics hubs, and free trade zones. The canal's expansion has also improved employment and stimulated investment in the surrounding economic zones within Panama.

=== Water issues ===
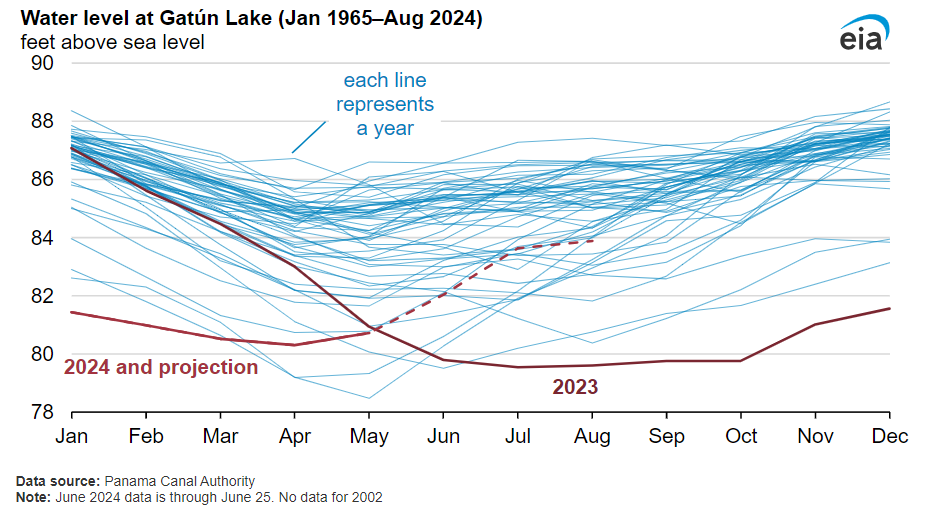
The water level at Gatún Lake from January 1965 to August 2024

Gatun Lake is filled with rainwater, and the lake accumulates excess water during wet months. For the old locks, water is lost to the oceans at a rate of 101,000 m^{3} (26.7 million US gal; 81.9 acre⋅ft) per downward lock movement. The ship's submerged volume is not relevant to this amount of water.

During the dry season, when there is less rainfall, there is also a shortage of water in Gatun Lake.

As a signatory to the 2000 United Nations Global Compact and member of the World Business Council for Sustainable Development, the ACP developed an environmentally and socially sustainable program for expansion, which protects the aquatic and terrestrial resources of the canal watershed. The expansion uses three water-saving basins at each new lock, diminishing water loss. It also preserves freshwater resources along the waterway by reusing 60 percent of water from the basins in the locks in each transit.

The mean sea level at the Pacific side is about 20 cm (8 in) higher than that of the Atlantic side due to differences in ocean conditions such as water density and weather.

The 2015–2016 fiscal year was one of the driest periods on record, restricting ships passage. Temperature rise has also caused an increase in evaporation. In normal times, 36 ships can transit the canal each day, but in early December 2023, ships were backing up because only 22 ships per day could transit due to low water levels. In January 2024, 24 ships per day were allowed to transit. In 2025, the canal authorities begun plans to improve water levels in the canal by building a new dam to feed Lake Gatun, the fresh water source for canal operations.

In 2026, the Panama Canal Authority reduced the number of ships per day because of low rainfall amid an intensifying El Nino event. From 3 September 2026, the waterway allowed 34 ships to pass through it, instead of 36. From 15 September 2026, the number of ships allowed to pass through it dropped to 32.

== Third set of locks project (expansion) ==
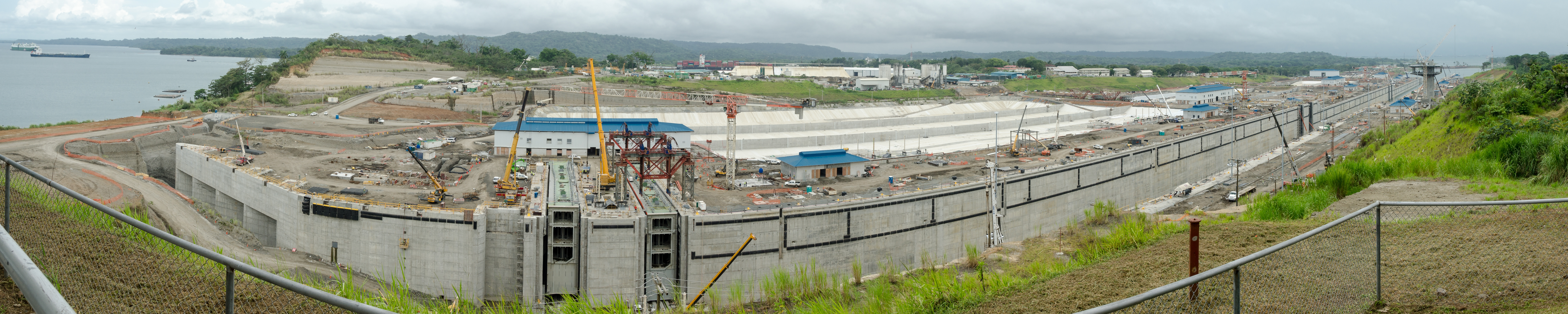
The New Panama Canal expansion project, July 2015

An enlargement scheme of the canal was completed and officially opened in June 2017. The project came out because changes in shipping patterns – particularly the increasing numbers of larger-than-Panamax ships – necessitated changes to the canal for it to retain a significant market share of transit between the Pacific and Atlantic Oceans. By 2011, it was estimated that 37 percent of the world's container ships had become too large for the earlier canal and locks. The maximum sustainable capacity of the original canal, given some relatively minor improvement work, was estimated at 340 million PC/UMS tons per year; it was anticipated that this capacity would have been reached by 2012 as close to 50% of transiting vessels were already using the full width of the locks. After a long period of consideration, an enlargement scheme to allow for a greater number of transits and the ability to handle larger ships, similar to the Third Lock Scheme of 1939, was recommended by the Panama's government canal authority. The expansion proposal was estimated to cost US$5.25 billion and expected to double the canal's shipping capacity by allowing both the passage of longer and wider Post-Panamax ships, with an increase in overall traffic. This proposal was approved in a national referendum by about 80% on 22 October 2006.

The canal expansion began in 2007. There were numerous engineering aspects to the project, including the excavation of material and construction of the new locks. On 3 September 2007, thousands of Panamanians stood across from Paraíso Hill in Panama to witness a huge initial explosion and launch of the Expansion Program. The first phase of the project was the dry excavations of the 218 meters (715 feet) wide trench connecting the Gaillard Cut with the Pacific coast, removing 47 million cubic meters of earth and rock. It was announced in July 2009 that the Belgian dredging company Jan De Nul, together with a consortium of contractors consisting of the Spanish Sacyr Vallehermoso, the Italian Impregilo, and the Panamanian company Grupo Cusa, had been awarded the contract to build the six new locks for US$3.1 billion. The design of the locks is a carbon copy of the Berendrecht Lock, which is 68 m wide and 500 m long, making it the second largest lock in the world after the Kieldrecht lock in the port of Antwerp, Belgium. By June 2012, a 30 m reinforced concrete monolith had been completed, the first of 46 such monoliths which will line the new Pacific-side lock walls. By early July 2012, however, it was announced that the canal expansion project had fallen six months behind schedule, leading expectations for the expansion to open in April 2015 rather than October 2014, as originally planned. By September 2014, the new gates were projected to be open for transit at the "beginning of 2016".

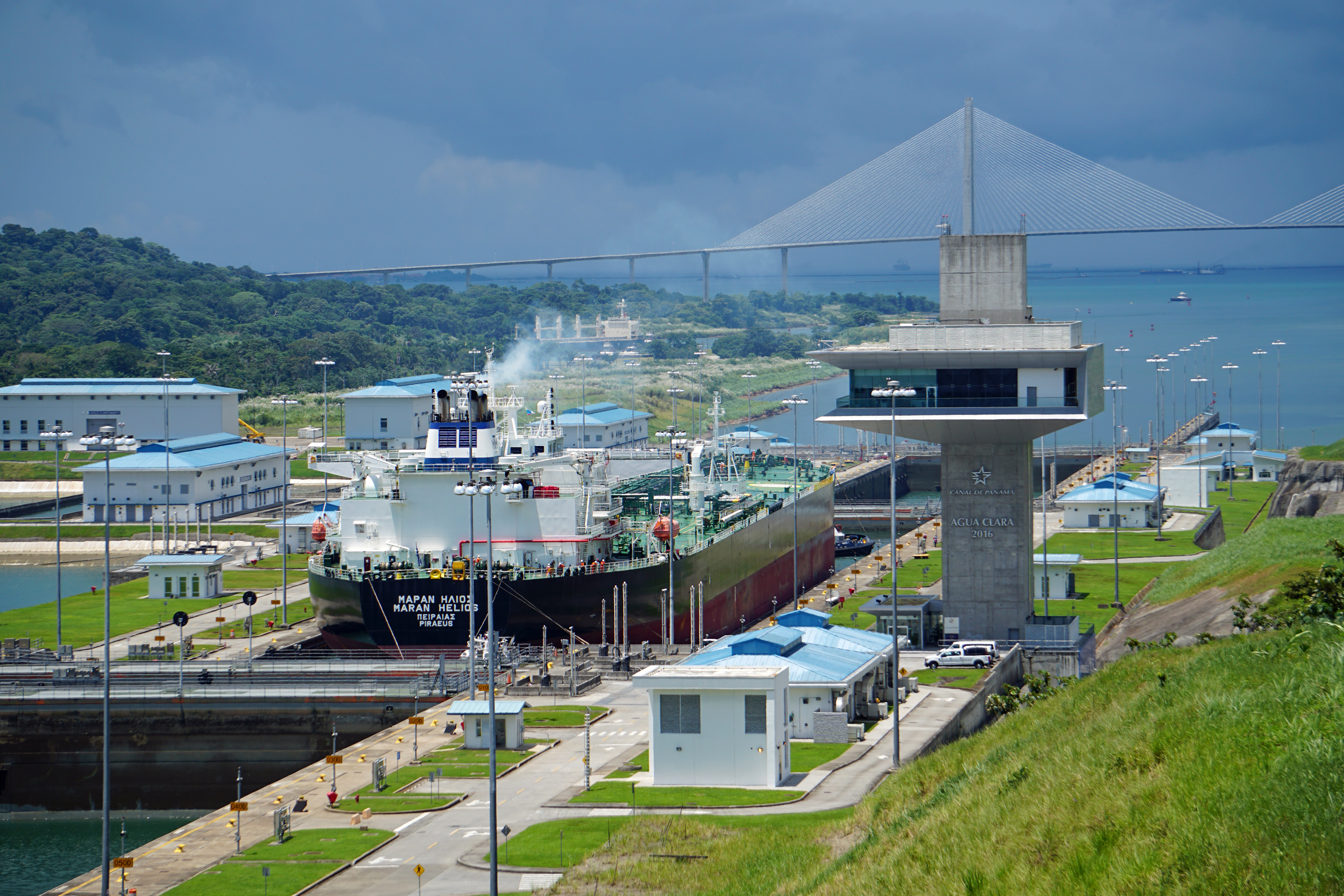
A Neopanamax ship passing through the Agua Clara locks

In January 2014, a contract dispute threatened the progress of the project. There was a delay of less than two months however, with work by the consortium members reaching goals by June 2014. In June 2015, flooding of the new locks began: first on the Atlantic side, then on the Pacific; by then, the canal's re-inauguration was slated for April 2016. On 23 March 2016, the expansion inauguration was set for 26 June 2016.

The expansion was completed in substance in 2016. The expanded canal has a maximum sustainable capacity of about 600 million PC/UMS tons per year. Tolls continue to be calculated based on vessel tonnage, and in some cases depend on the locks used. The new locks began commercial traffic on 26 June 2016, and the first ship to cross the canal using the third set of locks was a modern Neopanamax vessel, the Chinese-owned container ship Cosco Shipping Panama, with an official formal opening in 2017. The original locks, now over 100 years old, allow engineers greater access for maintenance, and are projected to continue operating indefinitely. After the construction of the new locks, in addition to the already existing ones, to date the ship with the largest dimensions transiting the "Panama Canal new sideway", had the following dimensions: 366.47 meters in length, 48.23 meters in width and 15 meters draft. The total cost is unknown since the expansion's contractors are seeking at least an additional US$3.4 billion from the canal authority due to excess expenses.

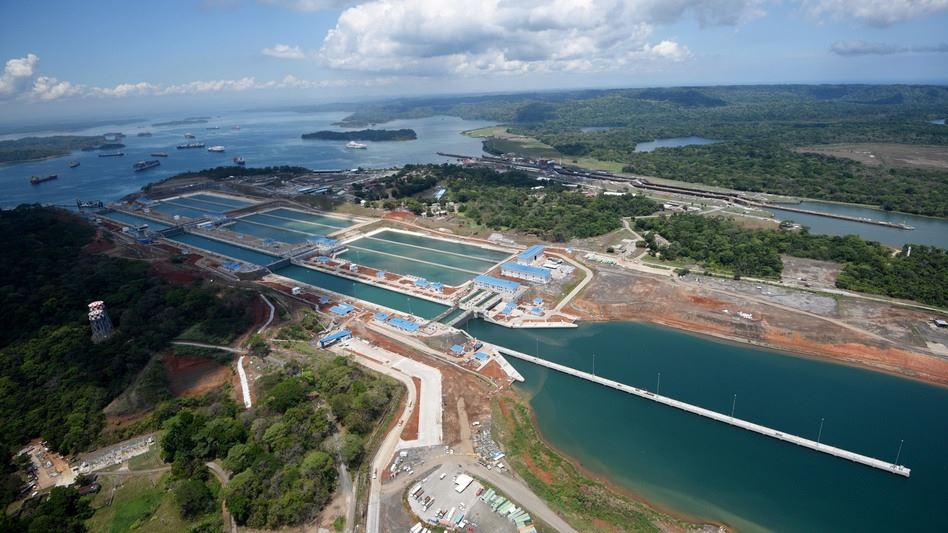
The new Agua Clara locks on the Atlantic side, in operation

The expansion plan include two new flights of locks built parallel to, and operated in addition to, the old locks: one east of the existing Gatun locks, and one southwest of the Miraflores locks, each supported by approach channels. Each flight ascends from sea level directly to the level of Gatun Lake; the existing two-stage ascent at Miraflores and Pedro Miguel locks was not replicated. The new lock chambers feature sliding gates, doubled for safety, and are 427 m (1,400 ft) long, 55 m (180 ft) wide, and 18.3 m (60 ft) deep. This allows the transit of vessels with a beam of up to 49 m (160 ft), an overall length of up to 366 m (1,200 ft) and a draft of up to 15 m (49 ft), equivalent to a container ship carrying around 12,000 containers, each 6.1 m (20 ft) in length (TEU). The new locks are supported by new approach channels, including a 6.2 km (3.9 mi) channel at Miraflores from the locks to the Gaillard Cut, skirting Miraflores Lake. Each of these channels is 218 m (720 ft) wide, which will require post-Panamax vessels to navigate the channels in one direction at a time. The Gaillard Cut and the channel through Gatun Lake were widened to at least 280 m (920 ft) on the straight portions and at least 366 m (1,200 ft) on the bends. The maximum level of Gatun Lake was raised from 26.7 to 27.1 m (88 to 89 ft). Each flight of locks is accompanied by nine water reuse basins (three per lock chamber), each basin being about 70 m (230 ft) wide, 430 m (1,400 ft) long and 5.50 m (18 ft) deep. These gravity-fed basins allow 60 percent of the water used in each transit to be reused; the new locks consequently use 7 percent less water per transit than each of the existing lock lanes. The deepening of Gatun Lake and the raising of its maximum water level also provide capacity for significantly more water storage. These measures allow the expanded canal to operate without constructing new reservoirs.

== Environmental and ecological consequences ==
The Panama Canal, one of the most important chokepoints in global trade, has caused many environmental and ecological problems since it was built and expanded. These problems include deforestation, the spread of invasive species, water and air pollution, and water shortage.

Deforestation in the Panama Canal drainage basin has been a problem for decades. In 1978, researchers said that "clearing the forest in the [drainage basin] might kill the canal." By 1985, the forested area had dropped to 30%. As of 2000, deforestation from human population growth, land degradation, and erosion continued to harm the ecosystem. Deforestation causes erosion, which raises the bottoms of the Gatún and Alajuela Lakes and lowers their ability to hold water. These lakes are very important for both canal operations and the local water supply.

The Panama Canal has made it easier for invasive species to move between oceans. When the canal was expanded in 2016 with the third set of locks, global trade increased, and so did the spread of invasive species. These species cling to the ship and move from one place to another, something that without the boats they would not have been able to do. One example is the Asian green mussel, first found in Caribbean waters in the late 1990s, which has spread through the canal. These invasive species can harm local ecosystems and compete with native species.

Ships passing through the canal regularly pollute the water. For example, in 1986, a crude oil spill east of the Caribbean entrance to the canal killed plants and invertebrates in the area. The shipping industry also releases emissions of greenhouse gases like carbon dioxide and methane. The Panama Canal, as a chokepoint, has a lot of heavy traffic and delays, which leads to burning more fuel and producing more emissions than needed. These emissions are a major concern because they contribute to climate change and increase environmental problems.

The Panama Canal uses a lot of fresh water from the Gatún Lake, which is Panama City's primary source of potable water. For each ship that passes through, about 200 million liters (52 million gallons) of freshwater are needed. This water use has serious environmental and social impacts. During a drought in 2019, Gatún Lake's water levels dropped to historic lows because so much water was being used for the canal.

== Planned Indio River Reservoir ==
In response to severe drought conditions that significantly impacted the Panama Canal's operations in 2023 and 2024, the Panama Canal Authority (ACP) announced plans to construct a 4600-hectare reservoir on the Indio River. The project aims to augment the canal's water supply and ensure consistent operations amid increasing climate variability. The reservoir, estimated to cost $1.6 billion, will include a dam and hold approximately 1.25 billion cubic meters of water. It is expected to provide water for up to 15 additional daily transits during the dry season and support over half of Panama's population with drinking water. This development followed a Panamanian Supreme Court decision in 2023 that redefined the legal boundaries of the canal’s watershed, enabling water projects like the Indio River reservoir to proceed beyond the traditional limits.

The project has also raised social and environmental concerns, as it would displace an estimated 2,000 people and submerge local villages. By 2024, the ACP had begun public consultations to explore mitigation strategies and compensation plans for affected communities. As of March 2026, relocations of affected families was to start in 2027; construction was expected to begin in 2028 and complete by 2031.

== Other proposed competing canal and rail routes ==
=== Nicaragua canal ===
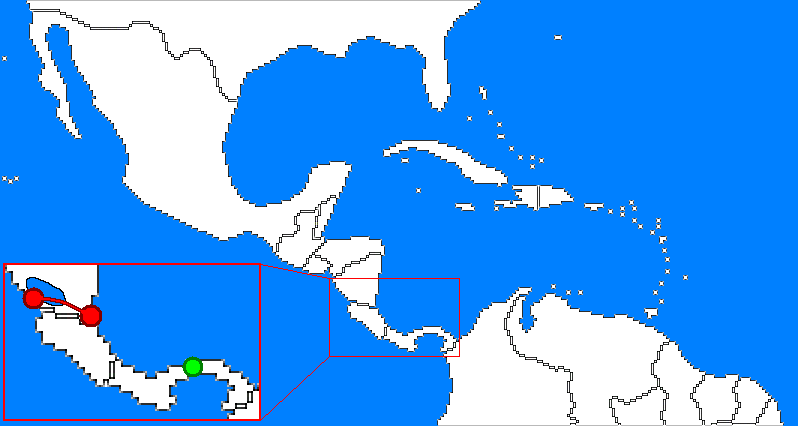
Proposed Nicaragua Canal (in red)

On 7 July 2014, Wang Jing, chairman of the HK Nicaragua Canal Development Investment Co. Ltd. (HKND Group) advised that a route for Nicaragua's proposed canal had been approved. The construction work was projected by HKND to begin in 2014 and take five years, although there had been little progress before the project's abandonment. The Nicaraguan parliament approved plans for the 280 km (174 mi) canal through Nicaragua and according to the deal, the company would have been responsible for operating and maintaining the canal for a 50-year period. By May 2017, no concrete action had been reportedly taken constructing the canal and further doubts were expressed about its financing. By 2018, the canal project was widely viewed as defunct.

=== Colombia rail link ===
In 2011, Colombia's then-president Juan Manuel Santos announced a proposal for a 220 km (137 mi) railway between Colombia's Pacific and Caribbean coasts. However, in 2015 the director of the Colombia-China Chamber of Commerce said the proposal "was mentioned in 2011 and subsequently had minimal relevance". As of 2025, the project is still only in the proposal stages.

=== Interoceanic Corridor of the Isthmus of Tehuantepec ===
The Interoceanic Corridor of the Isthmus of Tehuantepec (CIIT, by its initials in Spanish) is primarily a railway, with the Tren Interoceánico, to transport cargo and passengers from the Pacific Ocean to the Atlantic. Work started in 2019 and it opened for passenger services in December 2023, with all the works related to it having begun operation by July 2024. The Corridor is expected to have certain advantages over the Panama Canal, such as its speed, being able to transport cargo from one ocean to the other in about six hours, and its location, being closer to the United States than Panama, in addition to the proposed creation of ten industrial parks in the Isthmus with various tax benefits to encourage private investment. However, despite being often described as a potential alternative/competitor to the Panama Canal, the ambassador of Panama in Mexico, Alfredo Oranges, and the former director of the CIIT, Rafael Marín Mollinedo, have stated that they do not see the CIIT in this way, and that they prefer to see it as a "complement" to the Panama Canal, which could relieve the intense traffic the Canal has to cope with, with Panama having proposed collaborating with the Mexican government to make the Corridor more efficient.

== Master Key to Panama Canal and Honorary Pilots ==
During the last one hundred years, the Panama Canal Authority has granted membership in the "Esteemed Order of Bearers of the Master Key of the Panama Canal" and appointed a few "Honorary Lead Pilots" to employees, captains and dignitaries. One of the most recent was US Federal Maritime Commissioner Louis Sola, who was awarded for his work for supporting seafarers during the COVID-19 pandemic and previously transiting the canal more than 100 times. On the date of 25 April 2006, was awarded the title of Panama Canal Honorary Pilot the Senior Captain Raffaele Minotauro, an Italian citizen, an Unlimited Oceangoing Shipmaster Senior Grade, of the former Italian governmental navigation company known as the "Italian Line". This award was also given to Commodore Ronald Warwick, a British citizen, in 2014, a former Master of the Cunard Liners Queen Elizabeth 2 and RMS Queen Mary 2, who has traversed the Canal more than 50 times.

== See also ==
- Ajax (crane barge)
- Canal des Deux Mers
- Canal Zone Police
- Corinth Canal
- List of waterways
- Naval Base Panama Canal Zone
- Panama Canal Zone
- Suez Canal
