= Tomás Herrán =

Colombian diplomatic agent

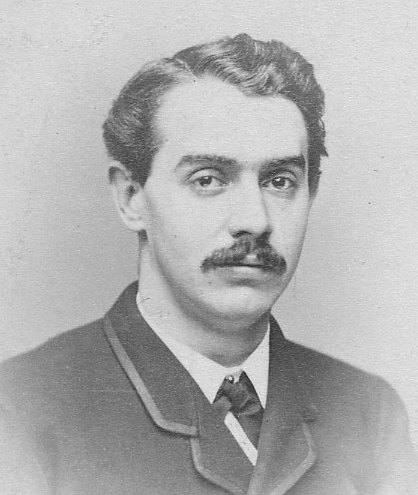

Chargé d'affaires for Colombia in the United States
- In office 1903

Personal details
- Born: September 21, 1843
- Died: 1904 (aged 60–61)
- Spouse: Laura Echeverri Villa
- Parent: Pedro Alcántara Herrán (father)
- Education: Georgetown University

Tomás Herrán y Mosquera (September 21, 1843 – 1904), a Colombian diplomat, signed and became a namesake of the Hay–Herrán Treaty of 1903.

== Family ==
Herrán was the son of Pedro Alcántara Herrán and the maternal grandson of Tomás Cipriano de Mosquera, who both served as President of Colombia.

== Education ==
Herrán graduated from Georgetown University with a B.A. in 1863 and an M.A. in 1868. He was awarded a Doctor of Laws by Georgetown in 1900.

At the time of the Hay–Herrán Treaty, Herrán served as Colombian chargé d'affaires in the United States of America. Herrán's papers were later published as The Letters of Tomás Herrán and the Panama Crisis, 1900–1903, edited by Thomas J. Dodd, Jr.
