= Postage stamps and postal history of the Canal Zone =

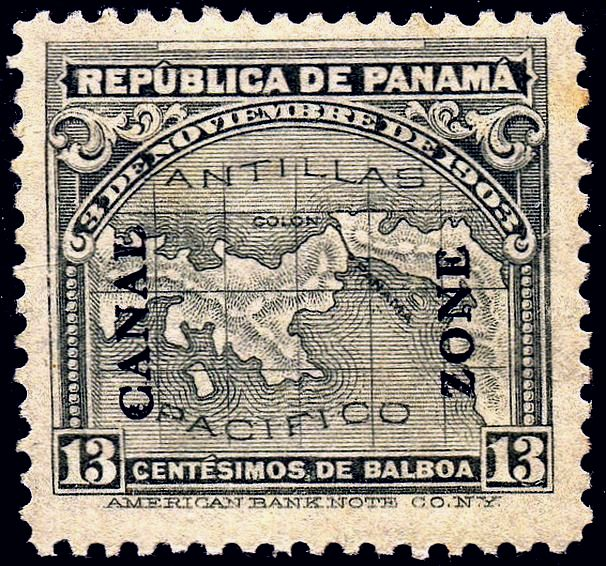
Early Canal Zone postage stamp issue of 1911

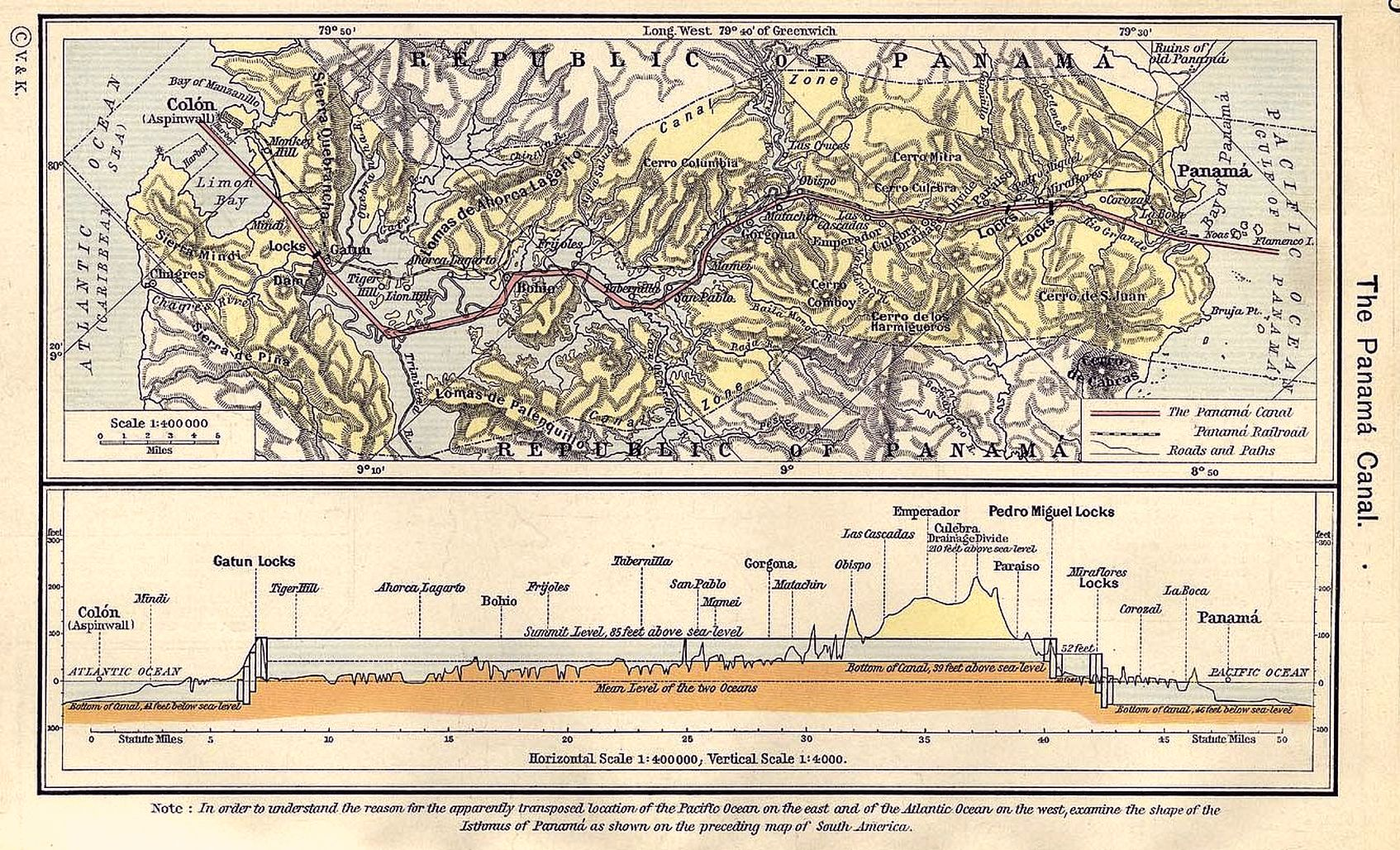
Panama Canal Zone Map, 1911

Postage stamps and postal history of the Canal Zone is a subject that covers the postal system, postage stamps used and mail sent to and from the Panama Canal Zone from 1904 until October 1978, after the United States relinquished its authority of the Zone in compliance with the treaty it reached with Panama.

The Canal Zone was a strip of territory 50 miles (80 km) long and 10 miles (16 km) wide across the Isthmus of Panama, and was ceded to the United States for the purpose of constructing and operating the canal which connected the Atlantic and Pacific Oceans. Upon the establishment of the Canal Zone in 1903, (Note: The actual canal was not completed until 1914.) seventeen post offices had also been established and were operated by the U.S. government. (Note: These Post Offices were located at Ancon, Cristobal, Culebra, Empire, Pedro Miguel, La Boca, Gatún, Paraiso, Bas Obispo, Bohio, Corozal, Gorgona, Las Cascadas, Miraflores, Matachin, San Pablo, and Taberuilla.) The Canal Zone and its post offices, with the main distributing office in Cristobal, operated as an independent government agency under the direct authority of the president of the United States. In the towns where there were railroad stations, the station agents of the Panama Railroad functioned as postmasters. Along with ships and freight, domestic mail and mail from around the world moved through the canal. The Canal Zone Post Office began operating and issued its first postage stamps on June 24, 1904. Initially these were the current stamps of Panama or (less often) the U.S., overprinted with 'CANAL ZONE' in various styles. Philatelists have identified over 100 varieties, some of them quite rare (and counterfeited).

== First issues ==
The Republic of Panama was formally part of Colombia, and after it broke away from Colombia, with assistance from the United States, it established itself as a separate nation where it immediately became necessary to establish its own post offices and issue its own postage stamps. The Canal Zone Post Office was inaugurated on June 25, 1904. Beforehand the domestic rates of postage in the United States were made applicable to all possessions of the United States on June 20, 1904, which henceforth included the Canal Zone.

The first Panamanian stamps consisted of existing Colombian stamps, which were overprinted with Panama. These in turn were used for Canal Zone postage and were again, overprinted with CANAL ZONE with a red bar at top blocking out the name Colombia. Many varieties of the overprinting of PANAMA and CANAL ZONE exist, including doubled overprinting, complete inverts and stamps with the letter A inverted or completely missing. The coloring of the overprinting varies from violet to bluish-violet, with the overprinting measuring 18 mm. The first comprehensive study of these issues was conducted by George L. Toppan, and his classification of the various varieties that occur in these issues is the most feasible one yet presented.

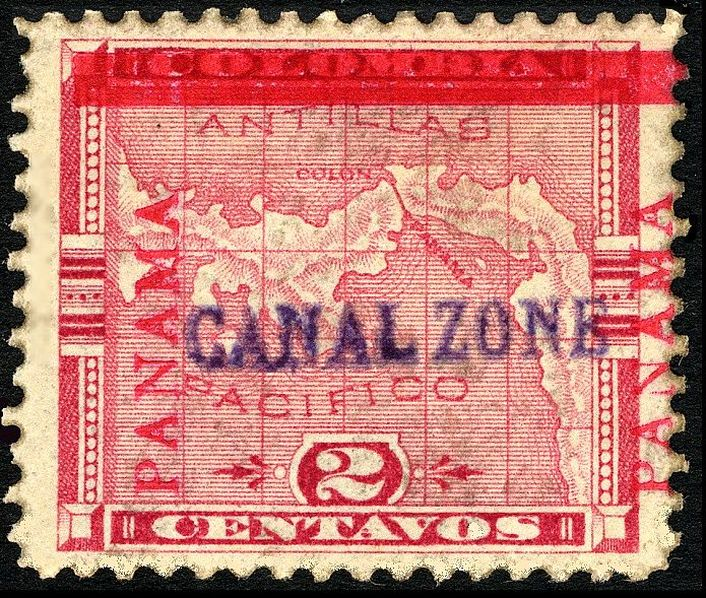
2-cent, Issue of 1904

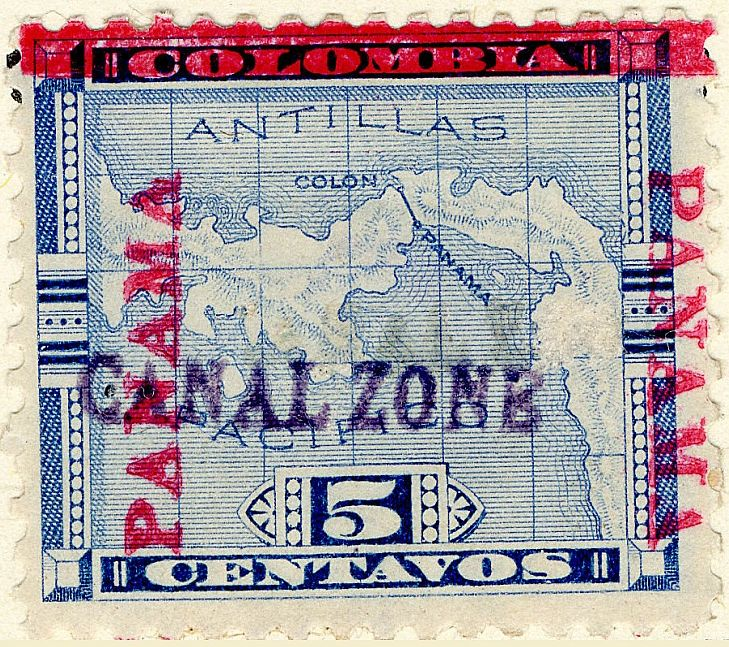
5-cent, Issue of 1904

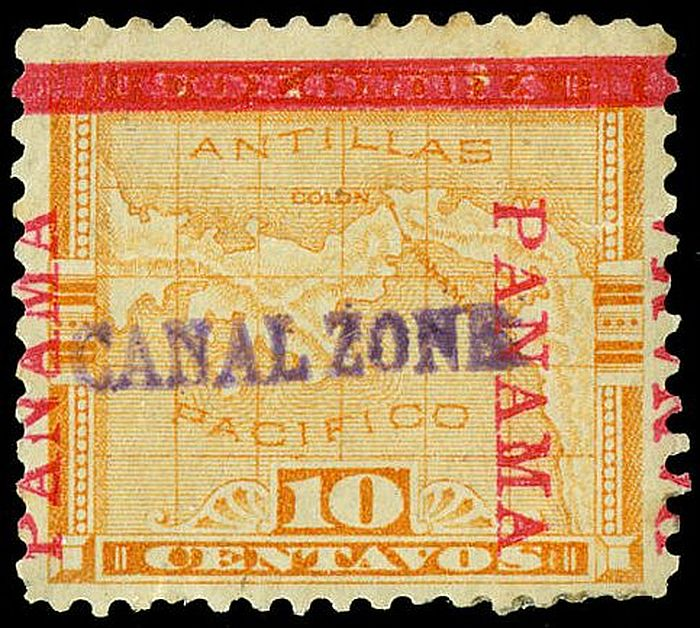
10-cent, Issue of 1904

The first stamps issued for Canal Zone postage consisted of three values, 2c, 5c and 10c, which were first issued on June 24, 1904, but were only used for twenty-four days, until July 17, 1904, and were removed from sale after that date. They were overprinted with a rubber handstamp. Dr. J. C. Perry, a surgeon in the U. S. Marine Hospital, and a philatelic student was stationed at Ancon at this time, whose investigations provided much information concerning this and some of the later series. In regard to the first stamp issues he said:

The first issue of stamps was authorized by executive order of the Governor of the Canal Zone, which provided that a limited number of stamps of the Panama Republic should be secured and surcharged "Canal Zone" in order to meet the demands of the postal service until the United States stamps properly surcharged could be obtained from Washington.

These first issues were carefully guarded and purchases were limited to the amount of one dollar in silver or fifty cents in U.S. currency. The executive order also cautioned anyone about buying or keeping large quantities of these stamps, as they would not be available for postage after the above date. However, this cautionary measure was unnecessary. This first series of Canal Zone overprint issues is the one with the most plentiful fakes.

== 1904 issues, second series ==
These stamps consisted of existing U.S. regular issues of 1902–1903 and were overprinted in 1904 with CANAL ZONE and PANAMA in vertical fashion, for use as Canal Zone postage: Issued in denominations of 1c, 2c, 5c 8c and 10c. Benjamin Franklin became the first historical figure to appear on Canal Zone Postage. The overprinting was conducted in Washington, D.C. These were the first U.S. stamps overprinted for use in the Canal Zone, and consisted of a huge quantity on 10-million stamps. As the stamps featured American historical figures, such as Benjamin Franklin, George Washington and Abraham Lincoln, they were generally not well received by the largely Panamanian population in and around the Canal Zone. These issues were briefly used for less than five months and were taken off sale as a result of the "Taft Agreement". This agreement was brought about as a result of an investigation into the protests made by Panama officials and business. These issues were in use from July 18 to December 11, 1904. Only a small percentage were actually sold, with the greater bulk of them destroyed on January 2–3, 1906, supervised by the Director of Posts, Tom M. Cooke.

Selected Issues :

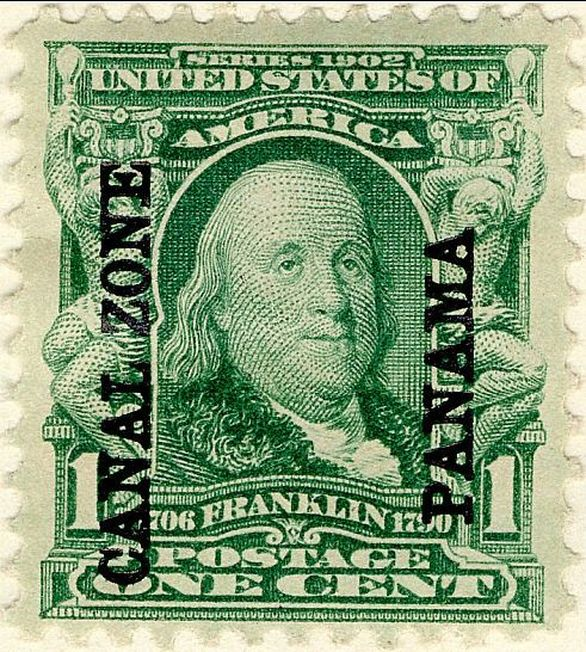
US regular Issue, 1c, overprinted

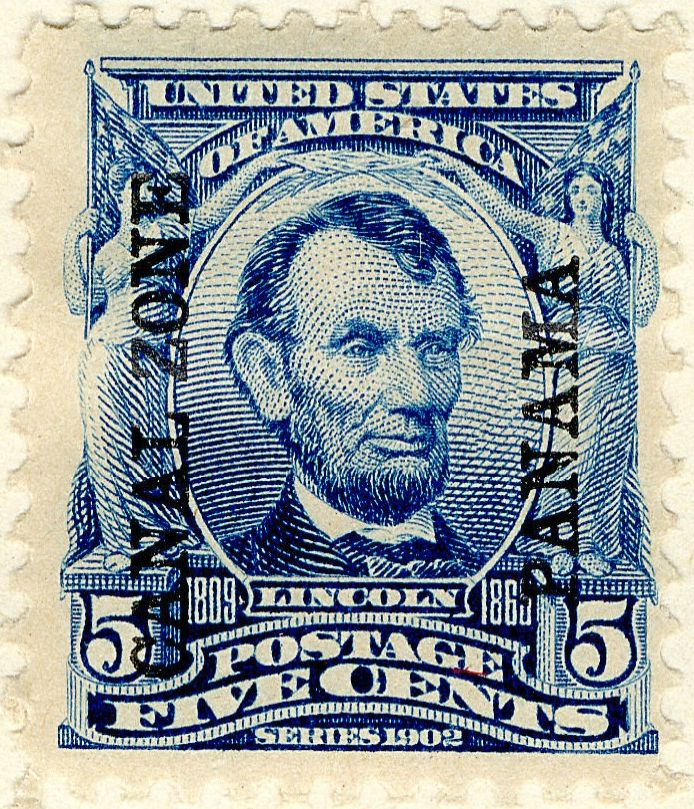
US regular Issue, 5c, overprinted

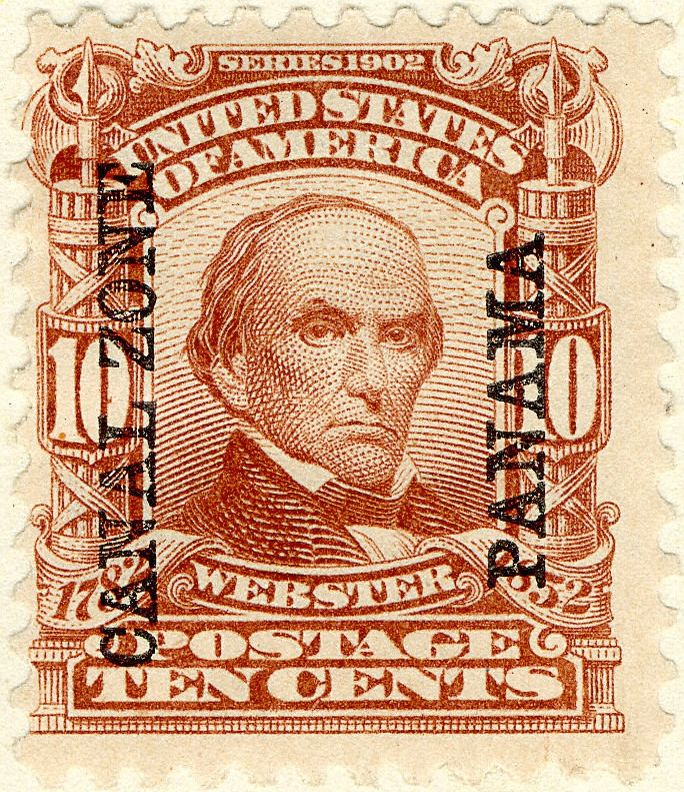
US regular Issue, 10c, overprinted

Two years after they were issued they were withdrawn from sale with the remainders of all values destroyed on January 2 and 3, 1906. Their withdrawal was arranged through an agreement between the Secretary of War, William Taft, and the Government of the Republic of Panama. The arrangement between the two governments resulted in many varieties for two reasons: One was due to the fact that the Canal Zone surcharge was printed on small quantities of stamps, with copper faced type which was reset at least five times for some of the values. The other was because many of the stamps used were those which had already been surcharged by the Panama authorities, and which were again surcharged with the Canal Zone overprinting. The last of these overprints were issued in 1939.

== 1904 issues, third series ==
In 1904, the Taft agreement required that Canal Zone stamps be produced by overprinting Panama stamps, and that 40% of their face value was to be paid to Panama. Somewhat similar to the map design of the first issues of 1904, the Third Series of Canal Zone stamps went on sale December 12, 1904. This issue was first overprinted by Mr. C. Bertoncini, who was the Chief of the Canal Zone Division of Map Making, and then transferred to the Printing Bureau of the Engineering Department, also known as the 'Commission Printing Office', in August 1905. The Third Series is very interesting because of the myriad combinations in the overprints. The Canal Zone Director of Posts, sent a memorandum to all postmasters instructing them to sell these stamps for their face value in gold, or in Colombian silver at the rate of two for one. All the stamps in this series were overprinted in black from the same style of Canal Zone plates, in several different stages, with slight changes in the lettering for each stage. The overprinting plate was set up to overprint a full sheet of 100 stamps in one pass. new plates were brought in after several printings as needed, with each plate resulting in variations or errors in the overprinting.

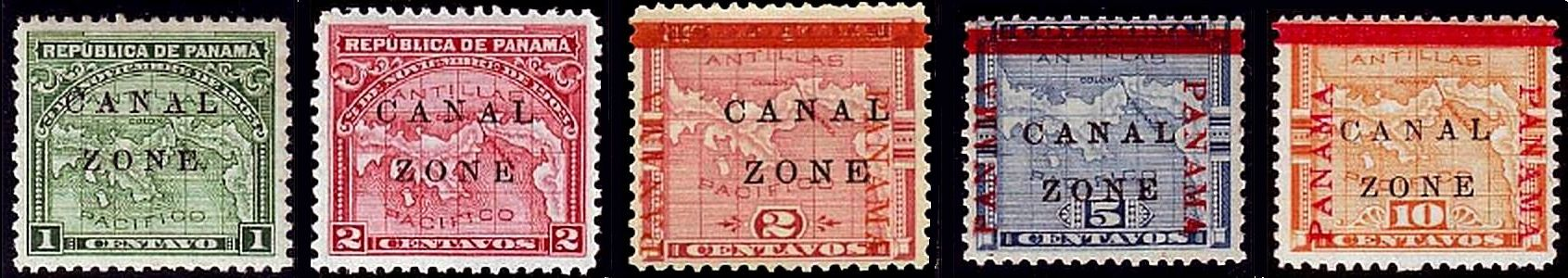

=== 8-cent surcharge ===
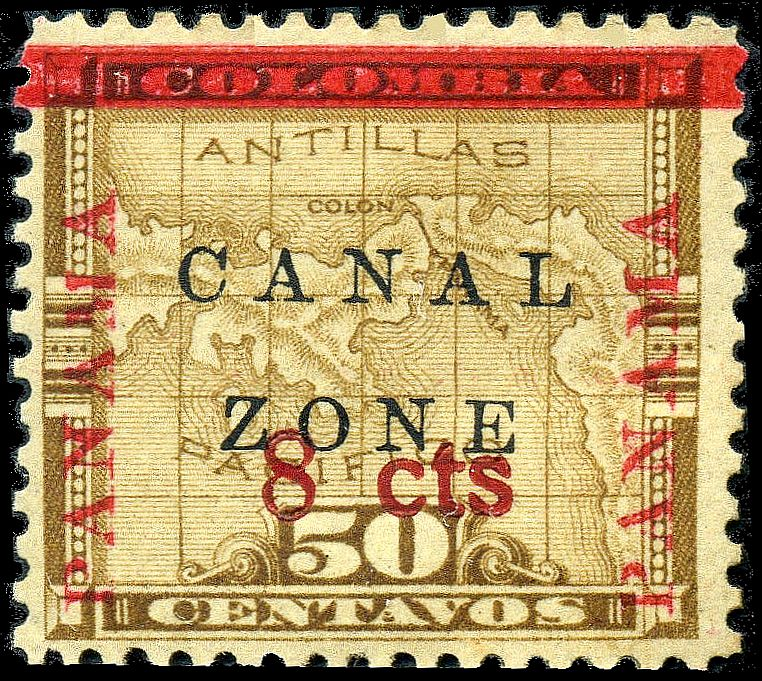
8-cent surcharge of 1904

In December 1904 the Canal Zone postal authorities requested from Panama a supply of 8¢ stamps for to be employed as registration fee stamps. Panama at the time did not have an 8¢ denomination in its current series of postage, making it necessary to prepare an 8¢ surcharge stamp to existing stocks of postage stamps. To this end Panama used their regular 50¢ stamp from their current series of issues. The 8¢ surcharge was made in Panama on Colombian stamps already overprinted with a red colored bar and the word PANAMA and occurs in varying thickness and forms. There are three varieties of the '8' in the surcharge.

== 1906–1909 issues ==
Postage stamps issued in 1906–1907 were printed by the Hamilton Bank Note Engraving and Printing Co, in New York; Those issued in 1909 were issued by the American Bank Note Company. This series of stamps features portraits of statesmen, educators and other prominent men involved in Panama's early history. There were ten designs in all. Some of the issues were printed with the portrait inverted. The 1909 overprints were printed at the Isthmian Canal Commission’s Printing Office in Panama City. The overprinting in the first printing places the word CANAL near the left side of the stamp, reading upward. Successive printings were issued with CANAL at the right, reading downward. Some of the issues have missing or partially missing overprints, doubled overprints and inverted overprinting. A specialized catalog is needed to determine which values have the various overprinting errors.

Selected issues:

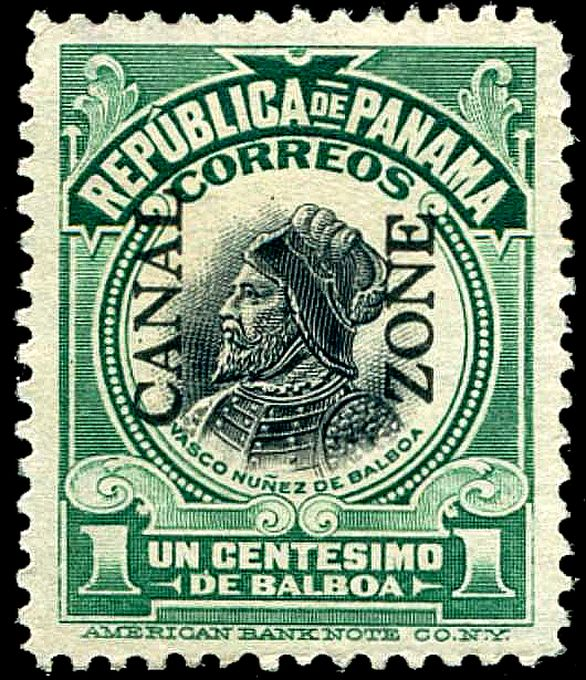
Vasco Núñez de Balboa Issue of 1906

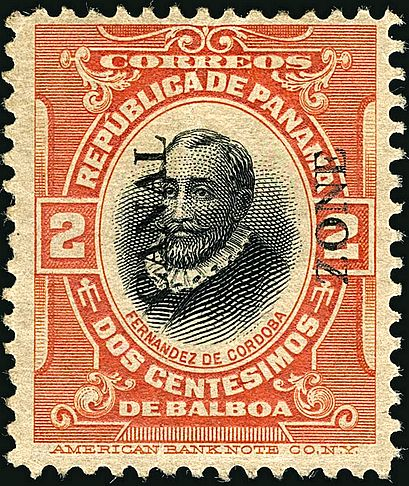
Fernandez de Cordoba Issue of 1906

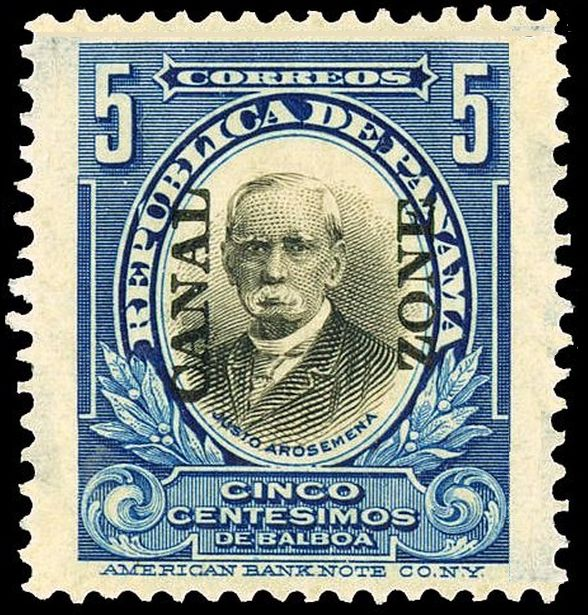
Arosemena Issue of 1909

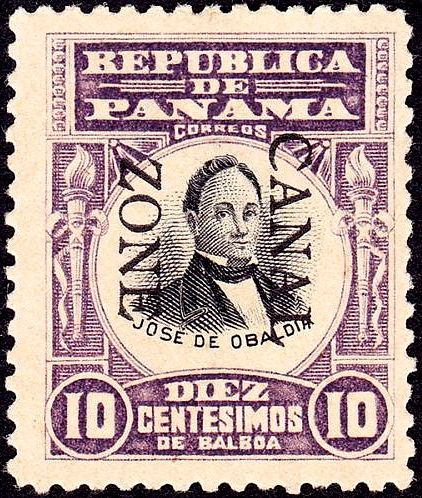
Jose de Obaldia Issue of 1906

A second series of stamps was issued in 1909, honoring the same figures depicted above in the 1906 issues, with same color themes for a given stamp, but with different border designs.

Selected issues:

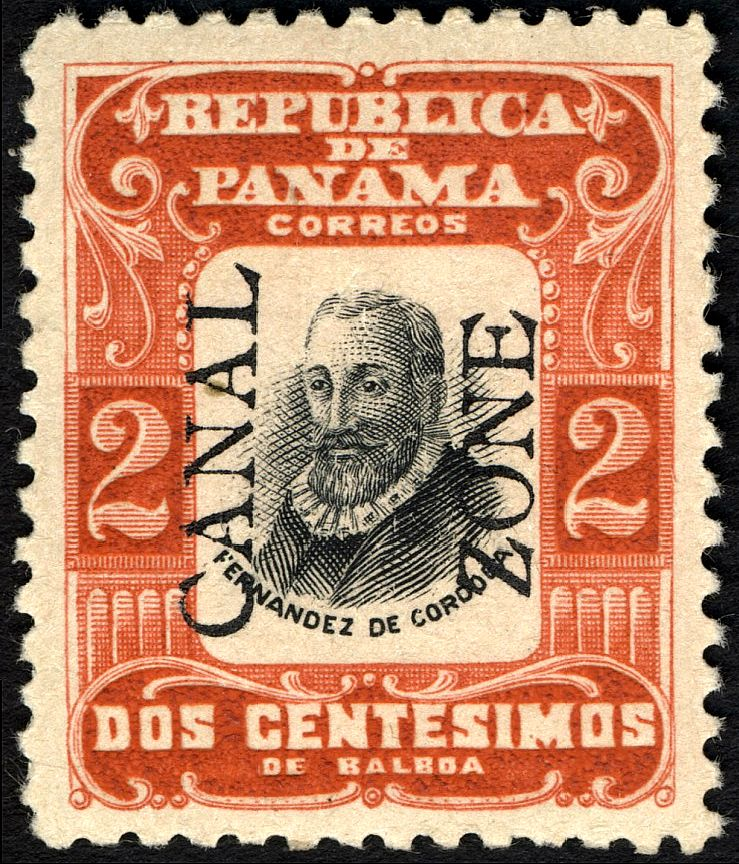
Fernandez de Cordoba, Issue of 1906

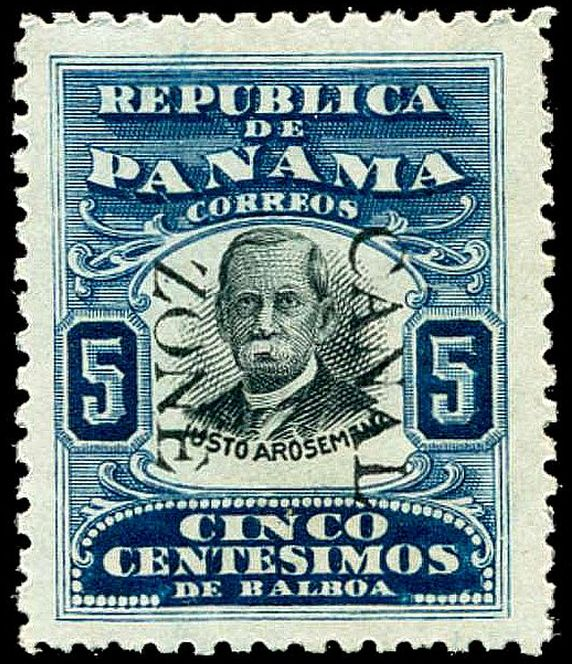
Justo Arosemena Quesada, Issue of 1906

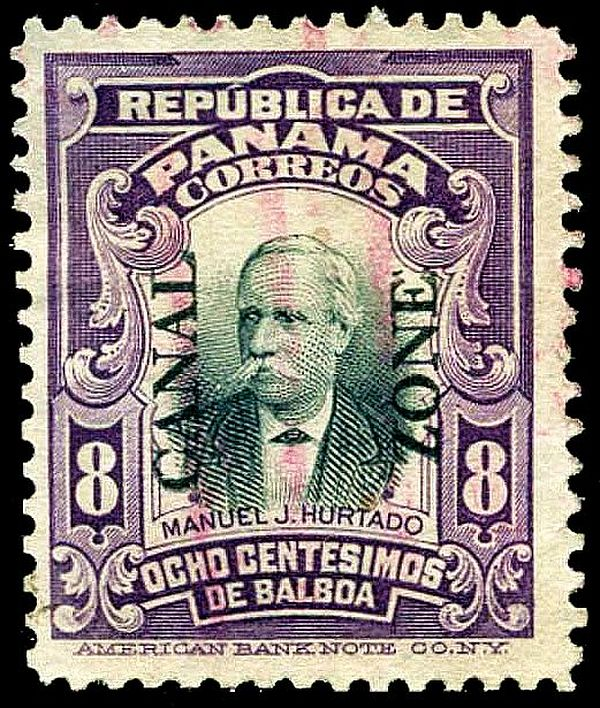
Manuel José Hurtado, Issue of 1909

== 1915 and 1917 pictorial issues ==
A set of four pictorial stamps were issued by the Canal Zone authorities on March 1, 1915, to commemorate the opening of the Panama Canal. These series of stamps were very different from any of the previous issues in both shape and design. The designs consists of a black picture (a vignette) in the center framed by a colored border design.

1915 Issues

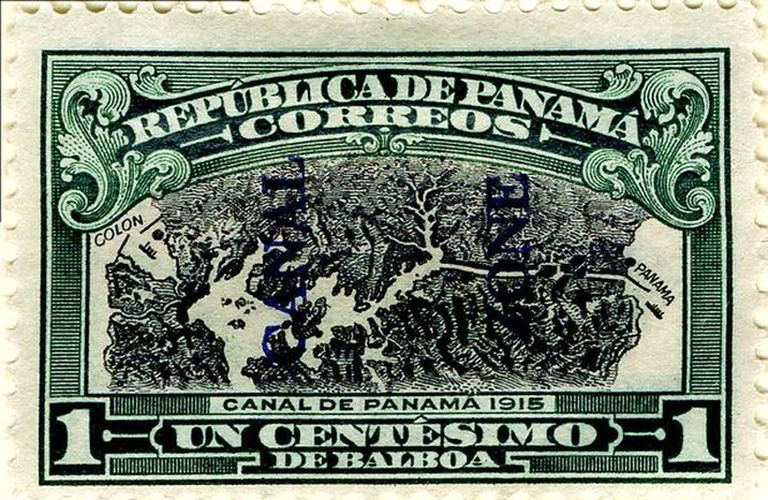
1915 Commemorative issue, 1c Map of Panama Canal

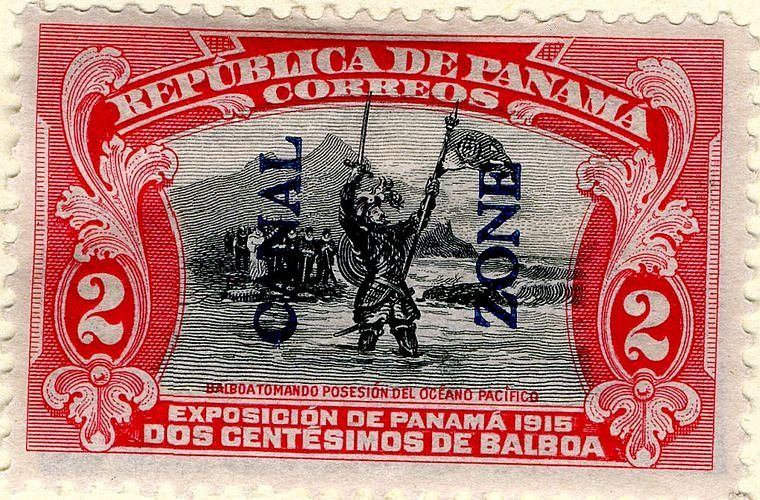
1915 Commemorative issue, 2c Balboa taking possession of the Pacific Ocean

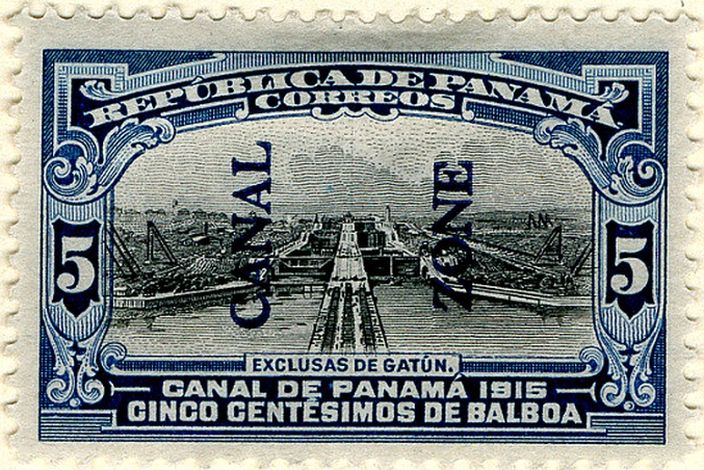
1915 Commemorative issue, 24c Gatun Locks

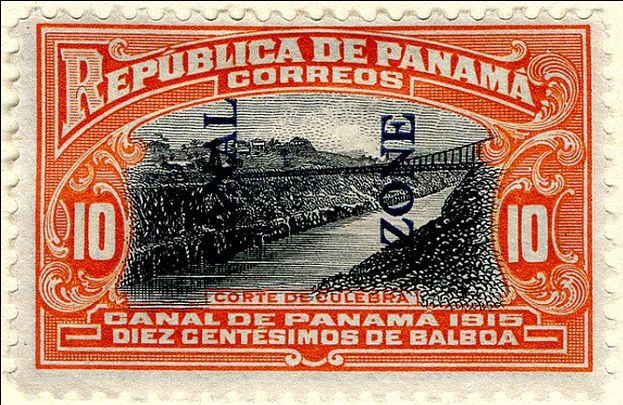
1915 Commemorative issue, 12c Culebra Cut

1917 Issues

A second series of three pictorial commemorative stamps were issued in January 1917. On November 27, 1916, Executive Secretary McIlvaine wrote to Panama's Secretary of Foreign Affairs Narciso Garay, informing him that the official name of the cut had been changed from 'Culebra Cut' to 'Gaillard Cut' but by then the 12c and 15c stamps commemorating this had already been printed with the former title. Most of the 1917 issues were never sold and were destroyed.

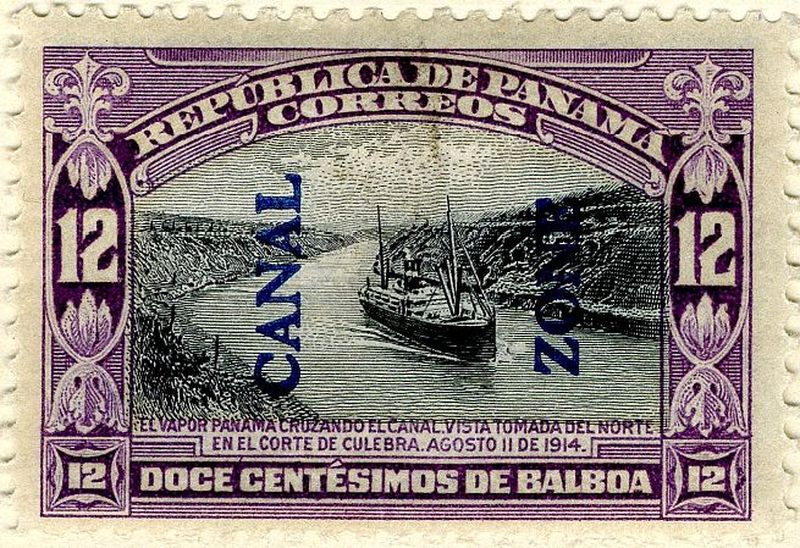
1917 Commemorative issue, 12c S.S. Panama in Culebra Cut

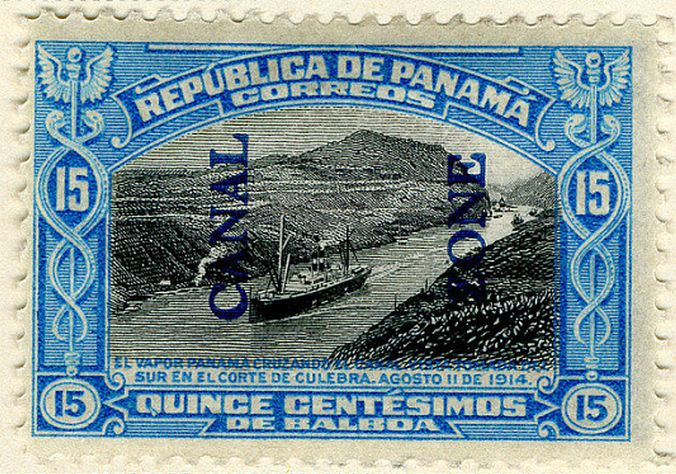
1917 Commemorative issue, 15c S.S. Panama in Culebra Cut

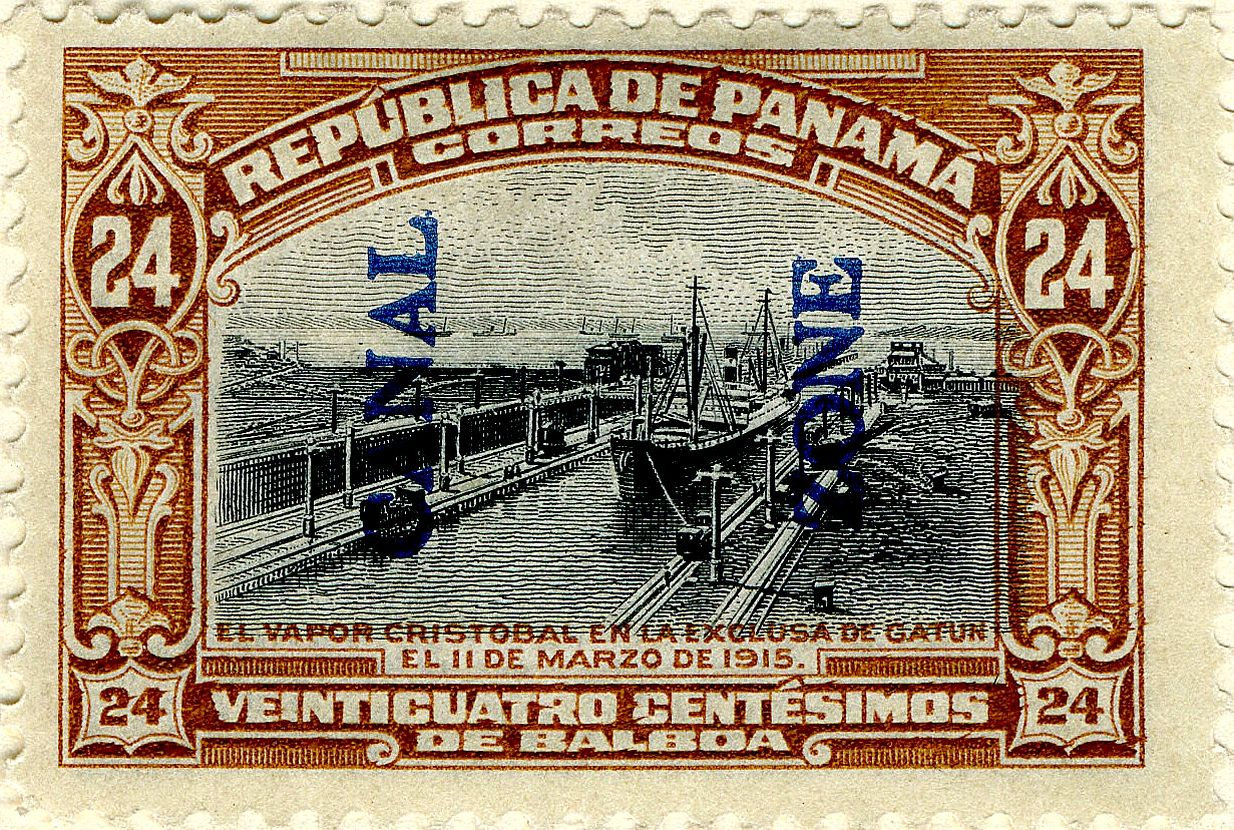
1917 Commemorative issue, 24c S.S. Cristobal in Gatun Locks

== 1921 issues ==
In 1921, the Republic of Panama planned to issue a centennial commemorative series in honor of the 100th anniversary of Panama's independence from Spain. The Canal Zone was invited to participate in a postal way and the Canal Zone's Executive Secretary was pleased to accept their invitation. By the middle of January 1924, all the stamps of the 1¢ and 2¢ denominations were nearly exhausted which prompted the next production of stamps, issued that year.

Selected issues :

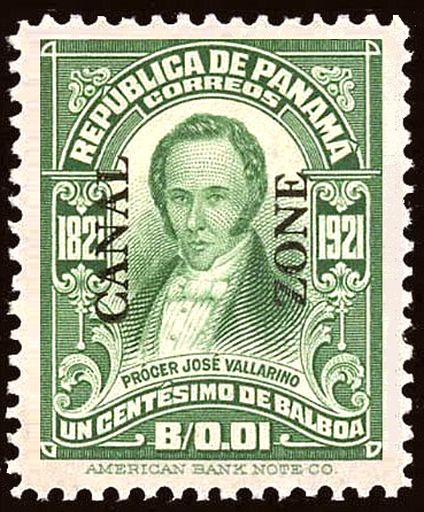
Vallarino, 1c, 1921 Issue

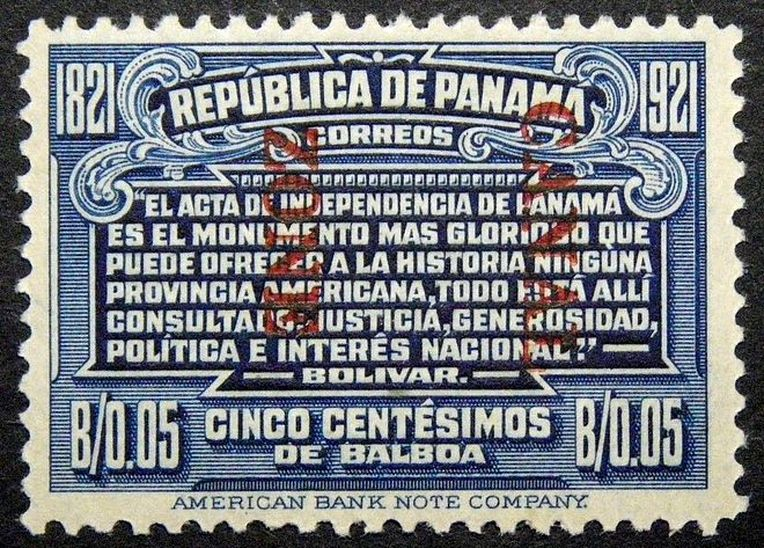
Bolivar's Tribute, 5c, 1921 Issue

== 1924 Coat of Arms issue ==
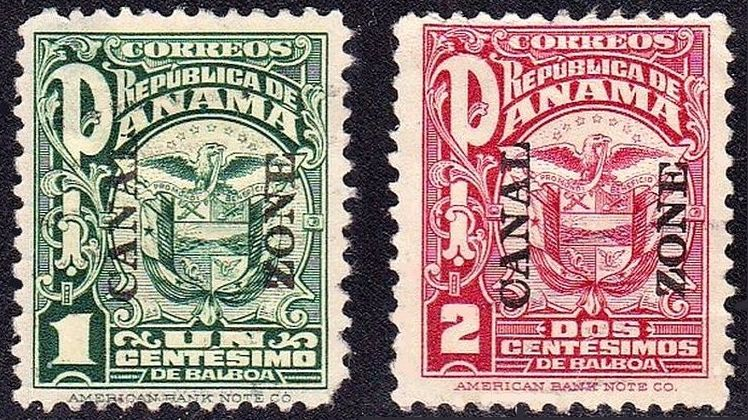
Coat of Arms Issue Only the 1¢ & 2¢ issues were released for postage in 1924.

Panama had ordered the new permanent coat of arms set both for use in Panama and for the Canal Zone. When stocks of the 1¢ Vallarino stamp were nearly used up, it became imperative to have a new supply of 1-cent stamps at once. The Canal Zone Postal Authority requisitioned 50,000 of the 1¢ stamp from Panama for overprinting at Mount Hope and Panama sent over the Vallarino 1¢ stamp. On January 28, 1924, these stamps were overprinted at Mount Hope. Panama was billed for the cost of this overprinting. Before Panama was sent its order for its coat of arms series from the American Bank Note Company, it sent a letter of inquiry to the Canal Zone Administration informing them of their pending order and requested estimates of Canal Zone's stamp requirements for the next year. The Canal Zone overprints were shipped from the United States in January and February 1924 and delivered to the Canal Zone. The coat of arms stamps were printed in denominations ranging from 1-cent to 50-cents; however, only the 1-cent and 2-cent issues were ever released for use as postage.

Selected issues :

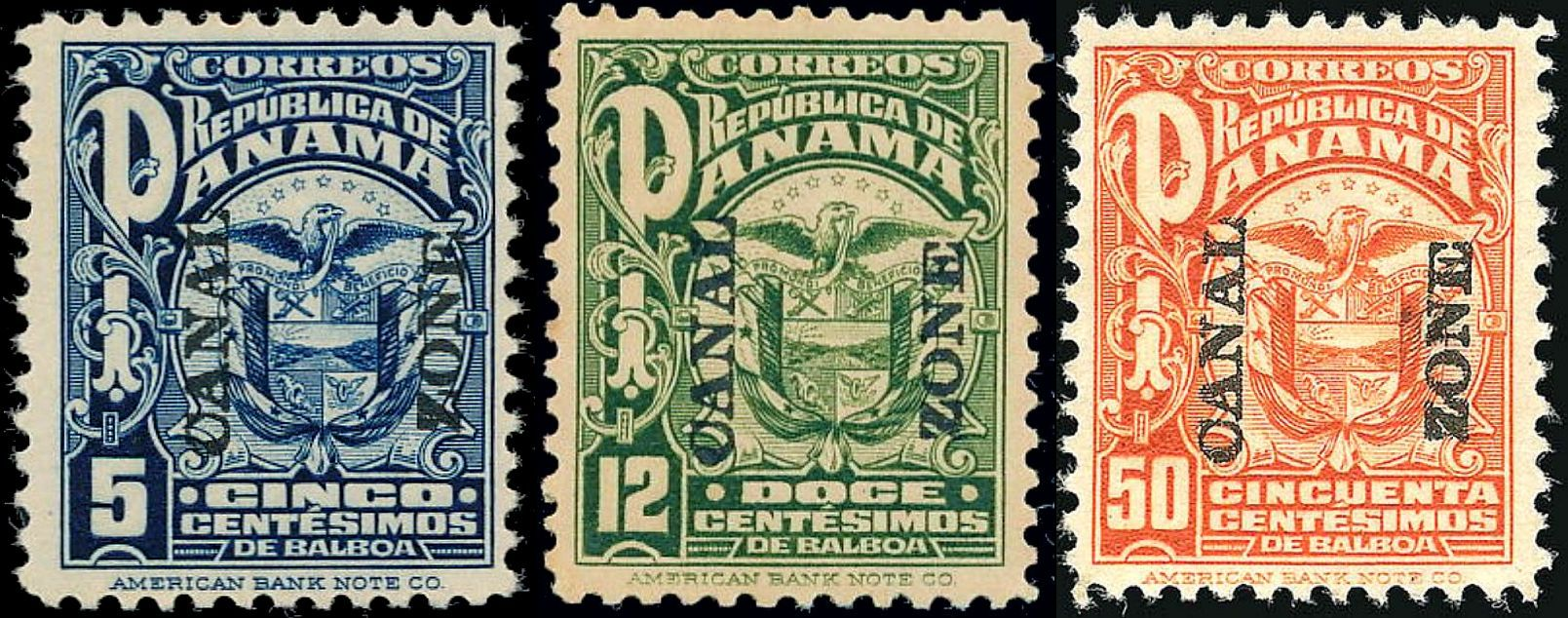
Panama Coat of Arms, overprinted for Canal Zone postage, 1924 Issue printed but never released for postage

== 1924–1925 overprints ==
U.S. Regular Issues printed on the flat plate press in 1922 were overprinted with the words CANAL ZONE and converted to Canal Zone Postage. The Bureau of Engraving and Printing received the first order of stamps from the Canal authorities in 1924.

Selected Issues :

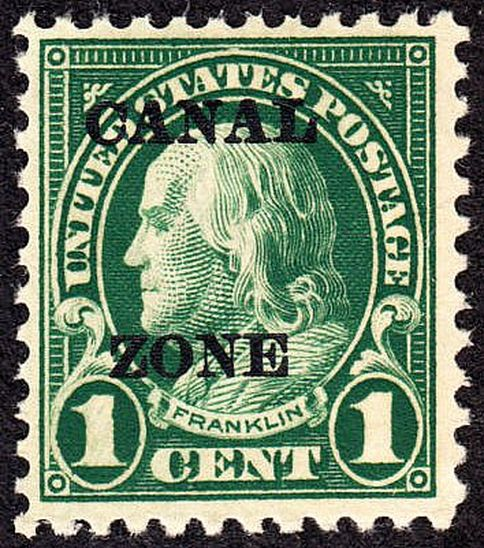

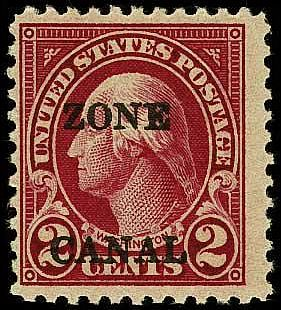

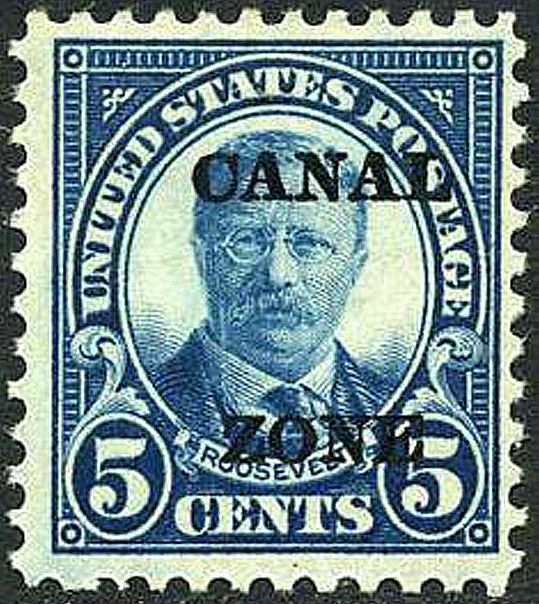

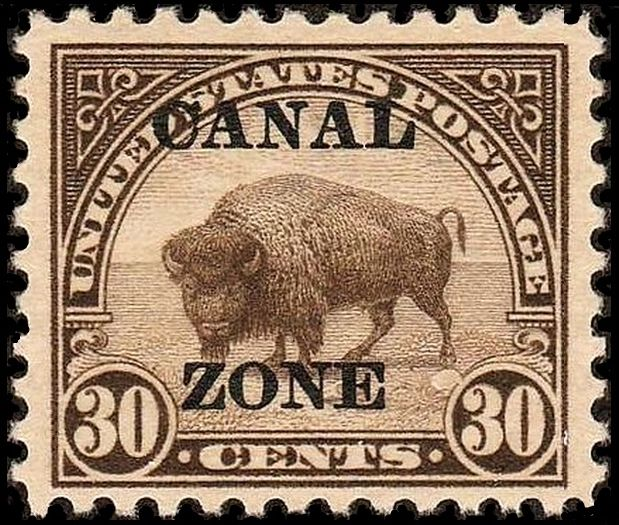

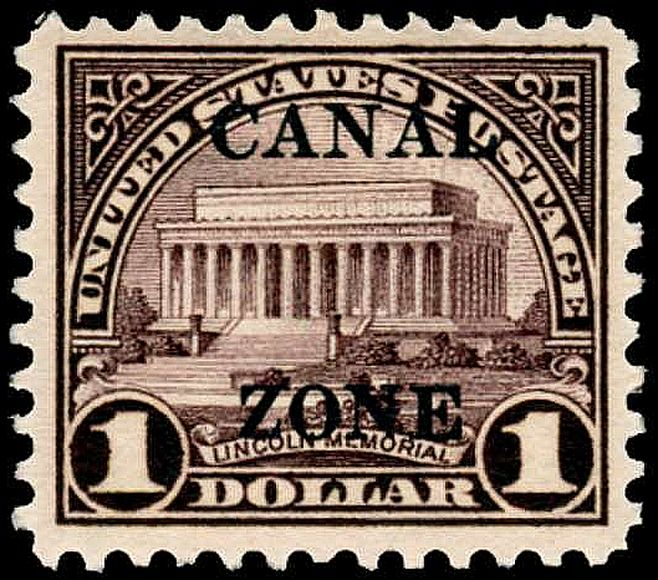

Regular Issues of 1922–1931
Overprinted and issued for Canal Zone postage in 1924–25

== 1928 permanent issues ==
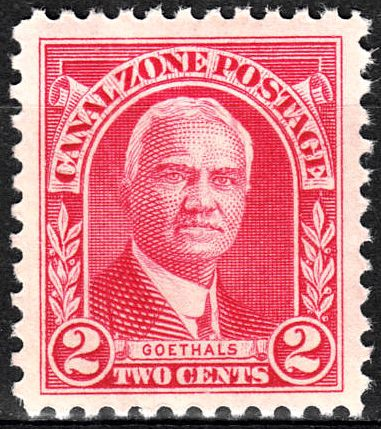
Maj. Gen. George W. Goethals, 1928 permanent issue

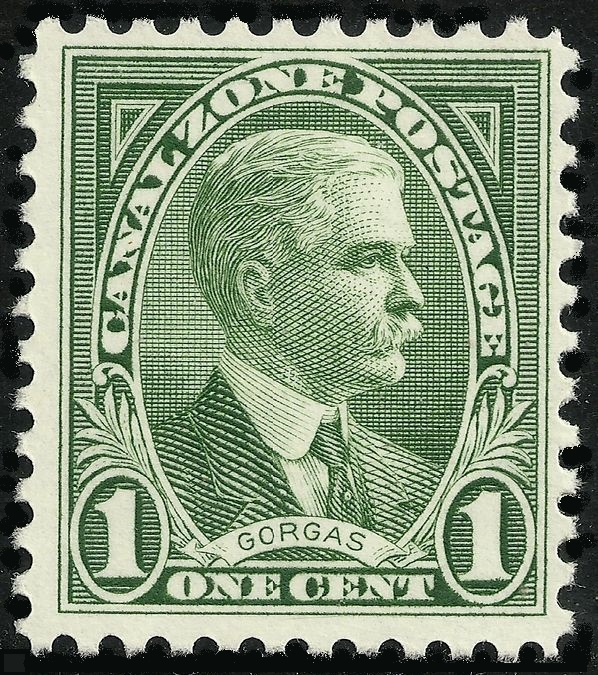
Maj. Gen. William C. Gorgas

On October 1, 1928, the first permanent issue Canal Zone stamp, 2 cent Goethals, was placed on sale. Other permanent issues followed, designed to honor new members of the Isthmian Canal Commission established on the Isthmus during 1907: Lieut. Col. George W. Goethals, Chairman and Chief Engineer; The denominations of the stamps honoring the various members of the Commission, were: 1¢, Gorgas, 2¢ Goethals, 10¢ Hodges, 12¢ Gaillard, 14¢ Sibert, 15¢ Smith, 20¢ Rousseau, 30¢ Williamson, and 50¢ Blackburn. Canal Zone permanent and provisional issues have since replaced all overprinted United States stamps and stamped paper.

== 1939 25th anniversary issues ==
On August 15, 1939 the Canal Zone Post Office issued a series of 16 stamps commemorating the 25th anniversary of the canal's completion, depicting "before" and "after" views of various points along the canal. Thereafter stamps appeared at an average rate of about two per year, with a commemorative set in some years and no stamps in others. The inscriptions were changed to just "CANAL ZONE" in the 1960s. This paralleled the abandonment of the word "POSTAGE" on many United States stamps, as the United States ceased to issue revenue stamps. The last such item replaced was the 2 cent postal card on November 1, 1958. In 1928, the Zone issued a definitive series inscribed "CANAL ZONE POSTAGE" depicting various persons involved in the construction of the canal, as well as a 5 cent value showing the Gaillard Cut.

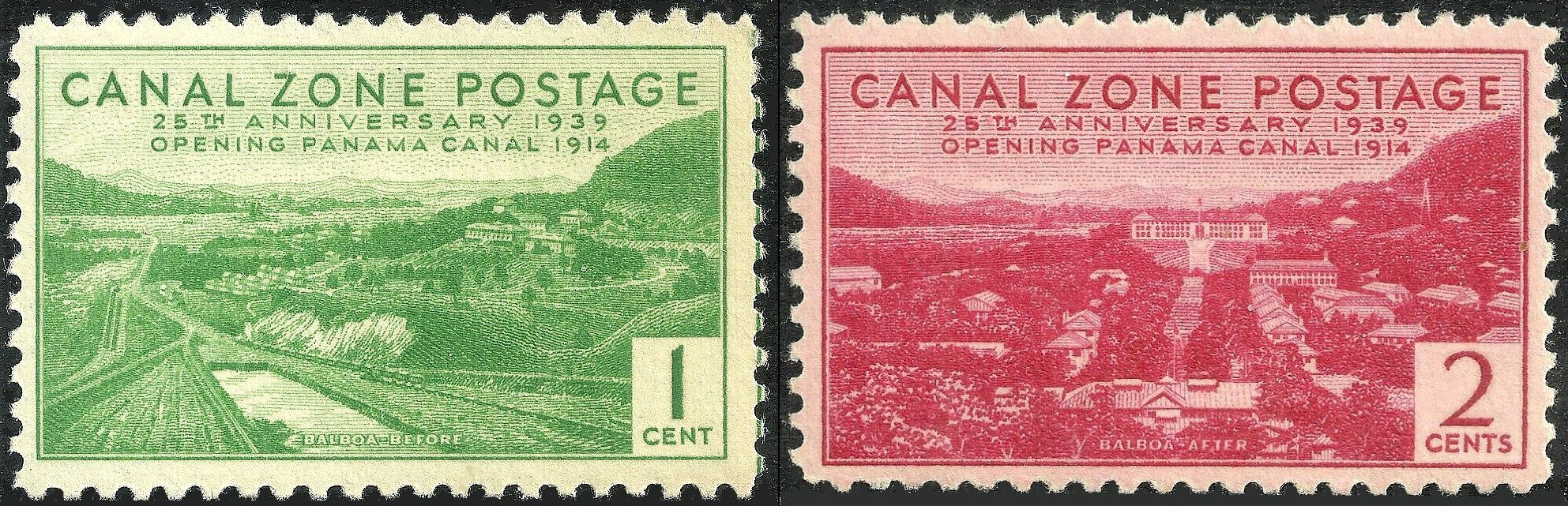
Balboa, before Balboa, after

Other selected issues :

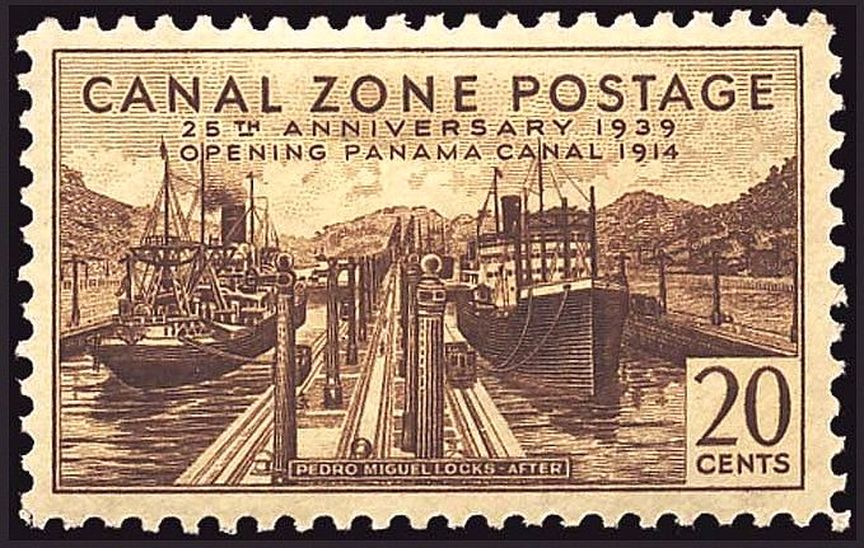
Pedro Miguel Locks

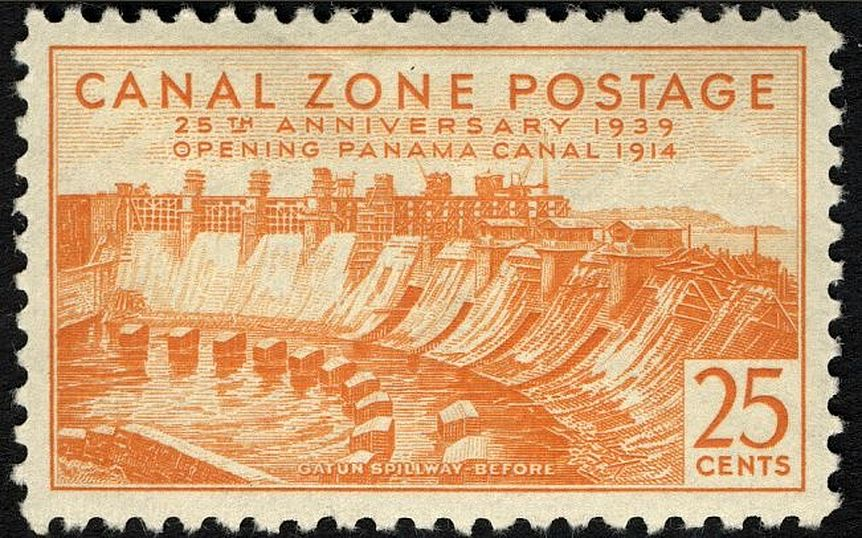
Gatun Spillway

== 1946–1949 issues ==
Between 1946 and 1949 five notable figures connected with the promotion and construction of the Canal Zone were commemorated on its postage.

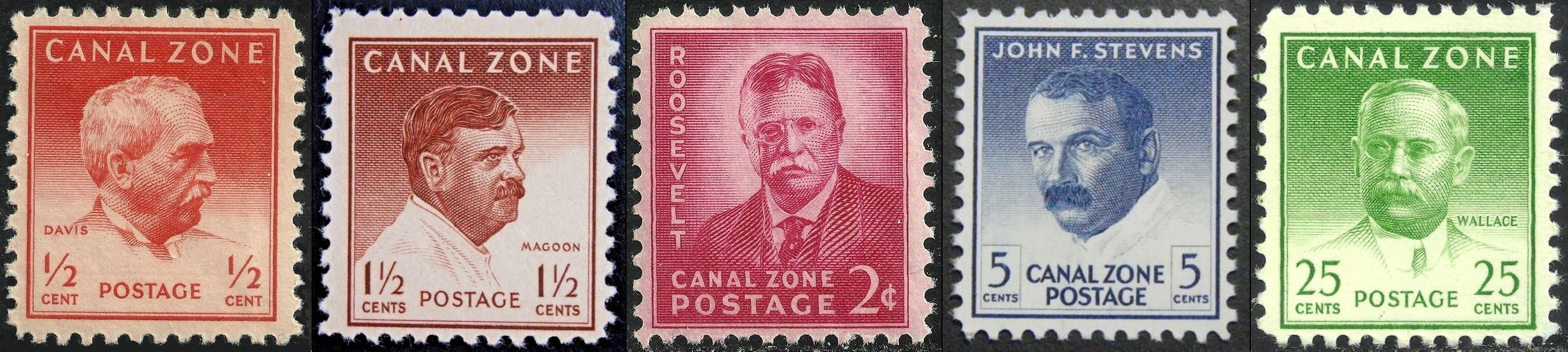
Davis, Magoon, Roosevelt, Stevens, Wallace

== Gold rush issues ==
On June 1, 1949, the Canal Zone issued four stamps commemorating the 100th anniversary of the California gold rush. Printed by the Bureau of Engraving and Printing, the stamps underscored the Isthmus of Panama's significant role as a major crossing point for gold seekers en route to California. They remained on sale until August 11, 1952, after which remaining stocks were destroyed.

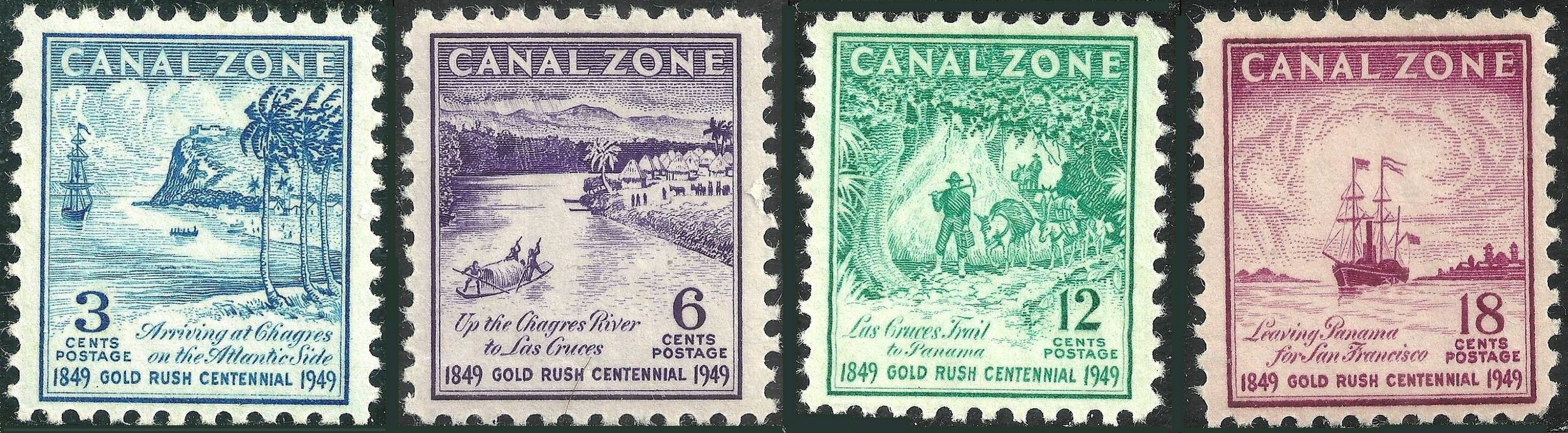
June 1949 Issues

== 1951–1960 issues ==
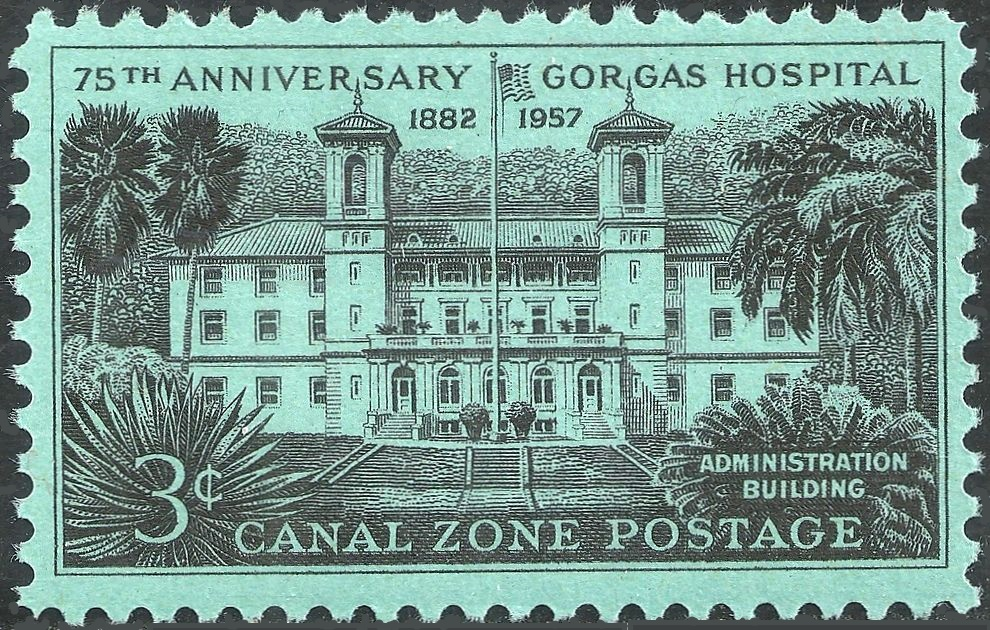
75th anniversary of Gorgas Hospital 1957 Issue

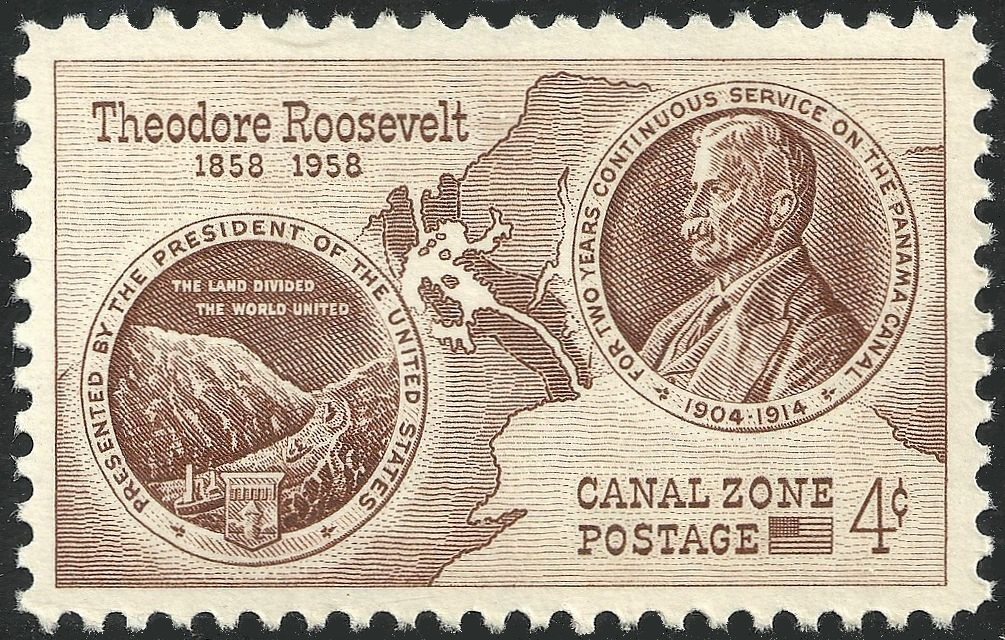
100th Anniversary Roosevelt 1958 Issue

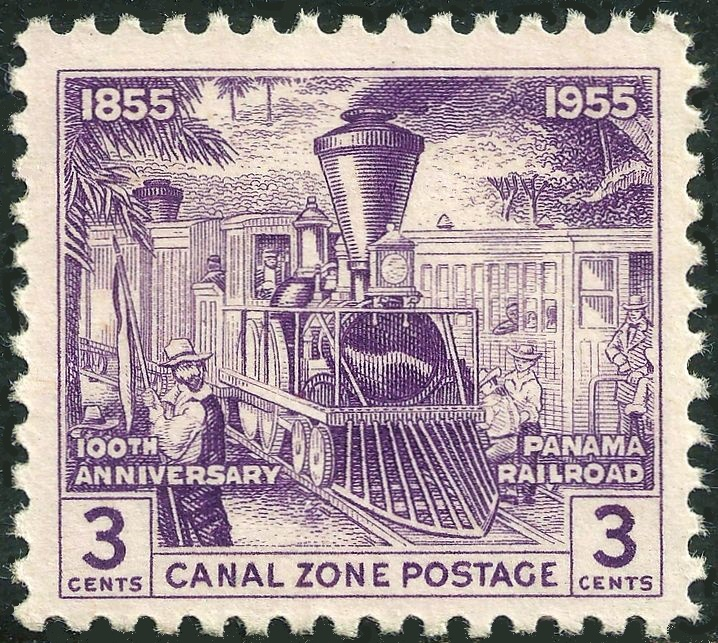
100th Anniversary of Canal Zone railroad 1955 Issue

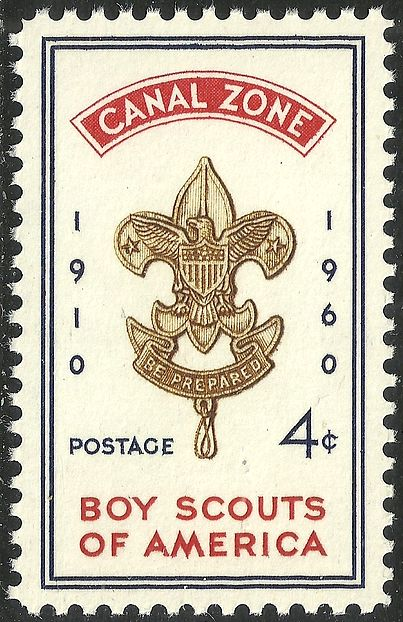
Boy Scouts 1960 Issue

== Air mail issues ==
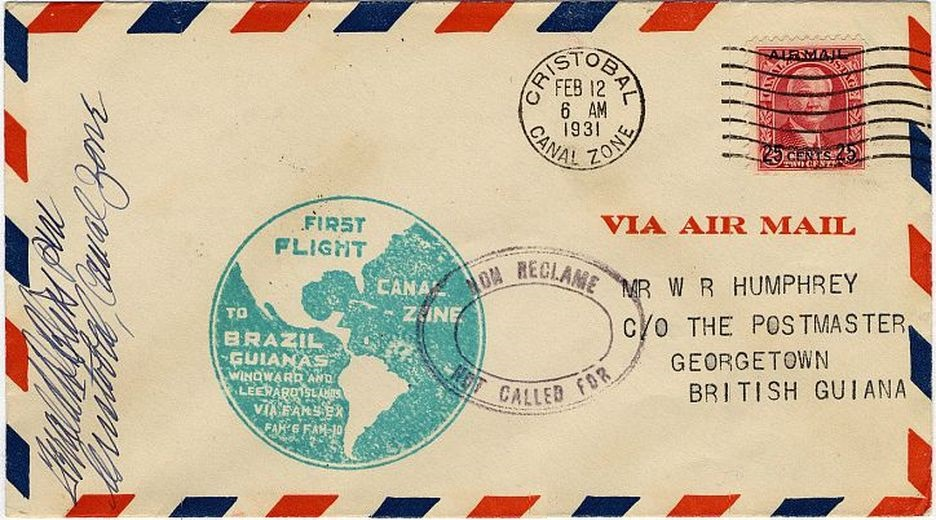
Canal Zone Airmail cover, franked with 25c overprint on Goethals 1928 issue, Postmarked Feb. 12, 1931

The first Canal Zone air mail stamps were issued in 1928–1929, with rates of postage over-printed on existing Canal Zone permanent issue stamps, issued in 1929.

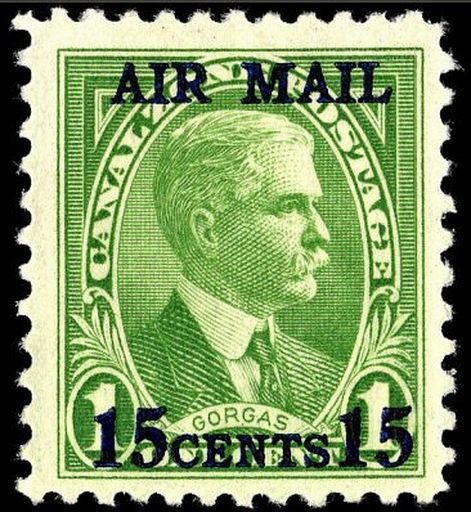
Canal Zone's air mail stamp, issue of 1929

=== 25th anniversary air mail issues ===
In 1938 the Canal Zone Postal Authorities issued a series of stamps commemorating the 25th Silver Jubilee anniversary of the opening of the Panama Canal, and the 10th anniversary of airmail service there. This series was printed on the flat plate printing press.

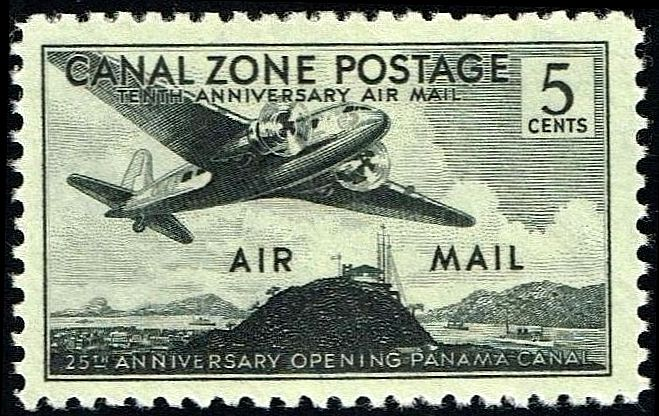

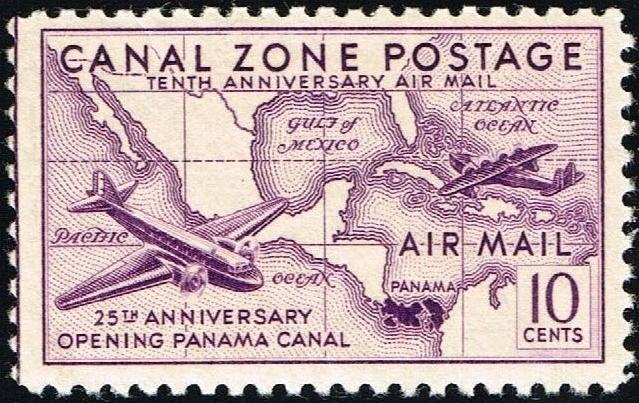

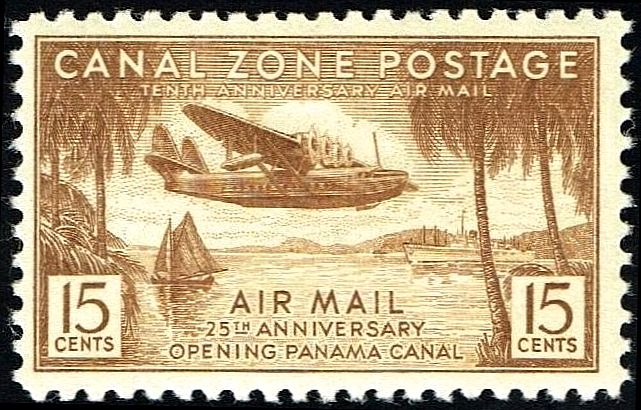

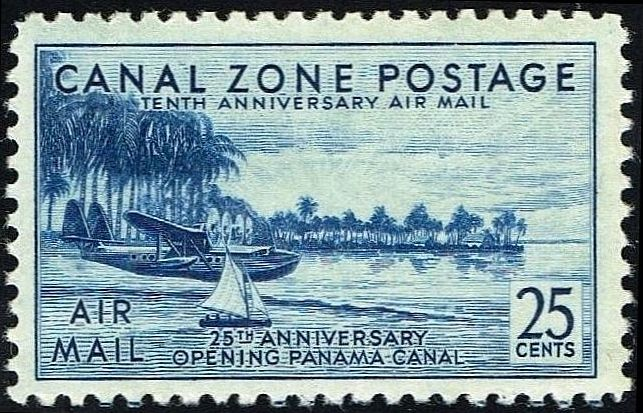

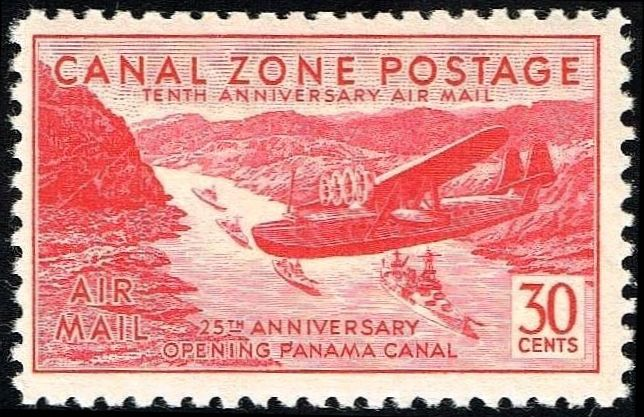

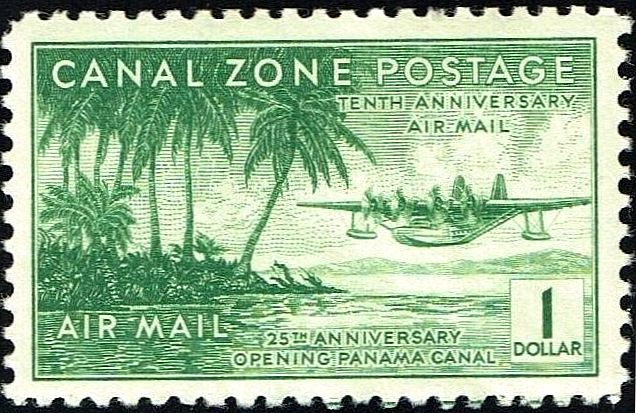

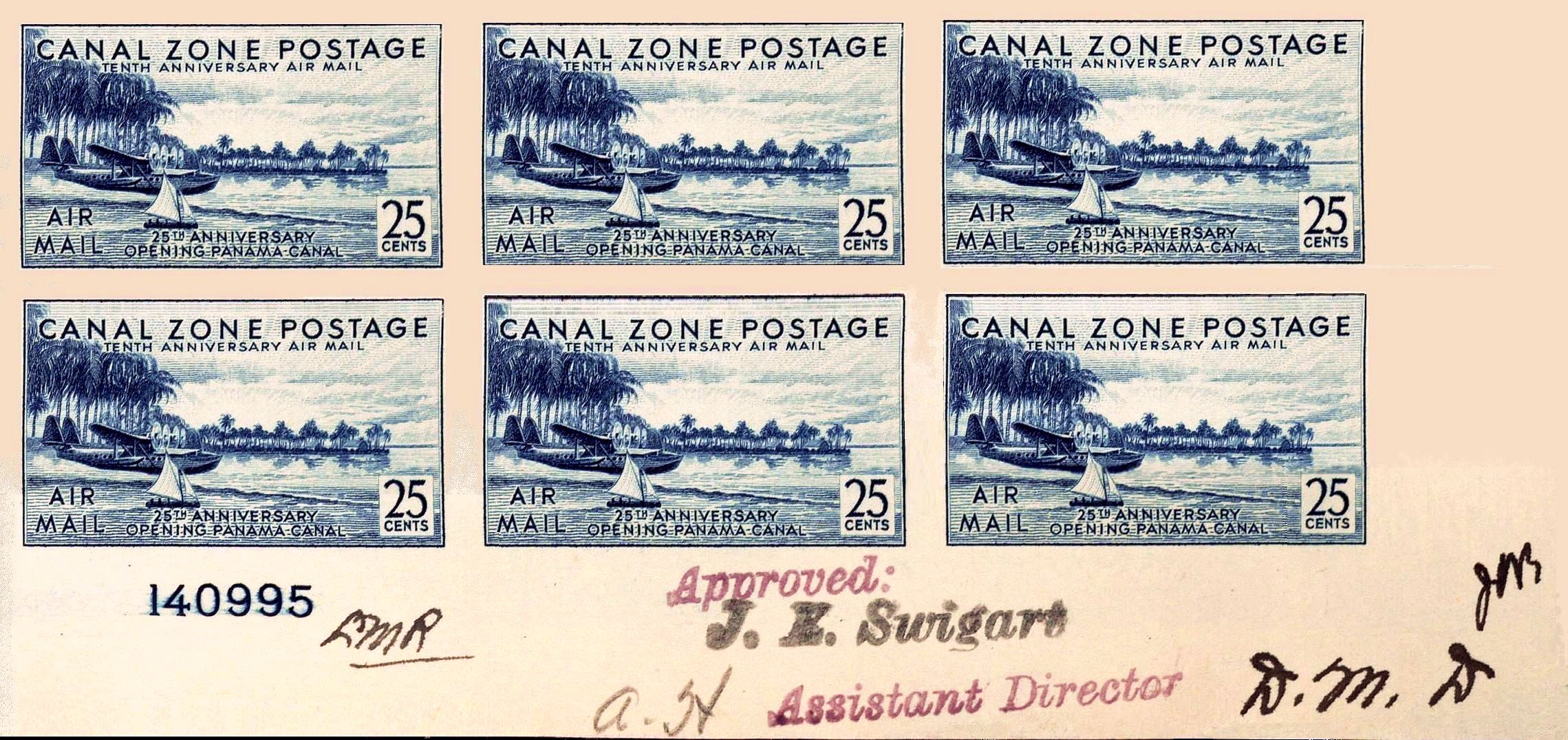
25 cent Canal Zone Air mail plate proof (detail of entire plate)

=== Winged globe issues ===
The Globe and Wing airmail stamps were issued 1951–1958 a six-stamp series replacing the Gaillard Cut permanent series with a more modern depiction of a winged airmail allegorical image. The image is superimposed on a depiction of a map of the Americas centered on the Canal Zone. Printed on the flat plate printing press, of 1951–1958, in denominations ranging from 4-cents to 80-cents. Printed in 1963, he 8-cent Winged Globe is the only Winged Globe printed on the rotary press. The 25-cent Globe and Wing stamp, issued on August 16, 1958, intended to pay the new airmail rate on letters to Europe.

Selected Issues :

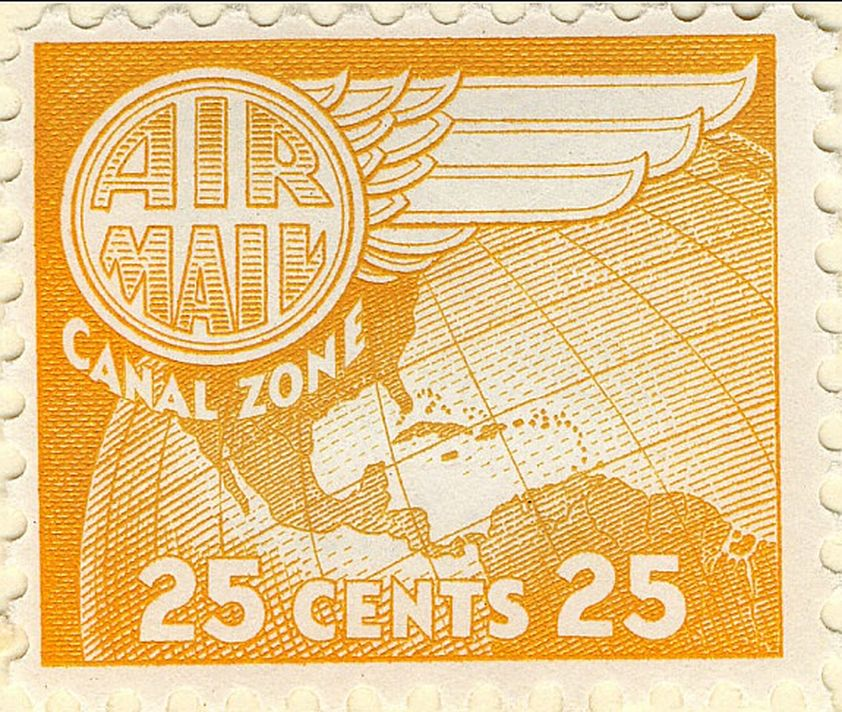

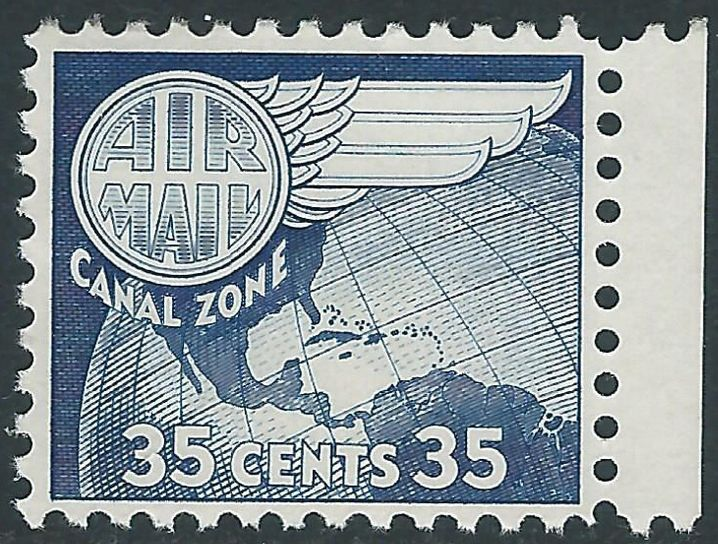

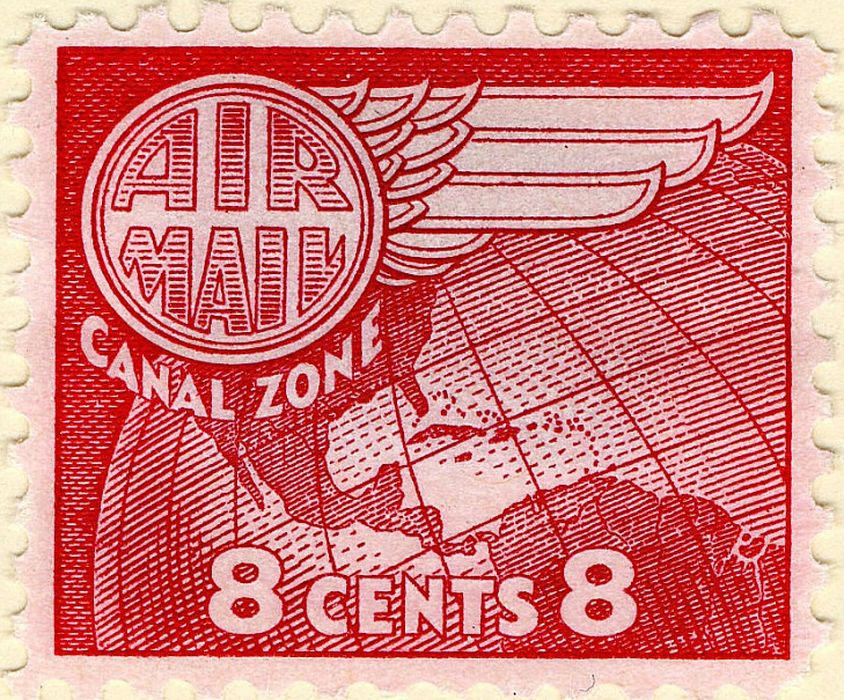

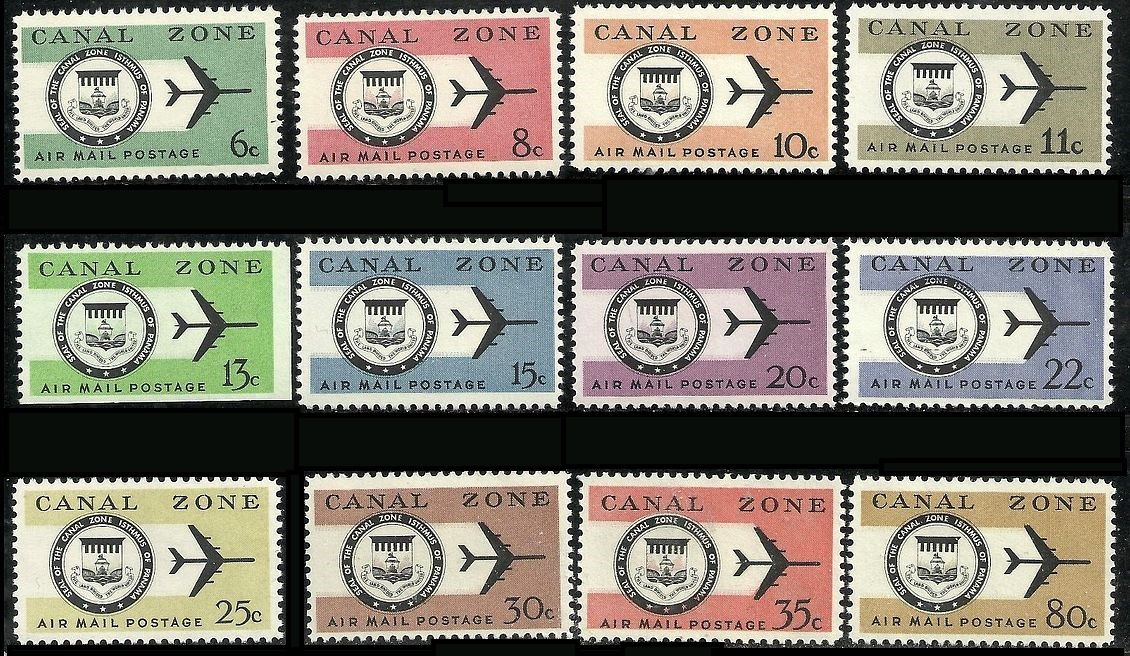
Canal Zone Air Mails, 1965–1976 Issues

=== Canal Zone seal and jet, issues of 1965–1976 ===
The Canal Zone Seal and Jet airmails were printed on the Giori press, issued in two series at intervals between 1965 and 1976. The first series (6-, 8-, 15-, 20-, 30-, and 80-cent) replaced the previous series of airmails on July 15, 1965. The 10-, 11-, and 13-cent stamps were printed to meet airmail rate changes to the United States, while the 22-, 25-, while 35-cent stamps covered the new air mail rates to the rest of the world. Each denomination in this series of twelve-stamp stamps represents a specific postal rate with the exception of the 80-cent, used to cover general and larger postage costs, usually used in conjunction with one or more of the lower rate stamps.

Selected Issues :

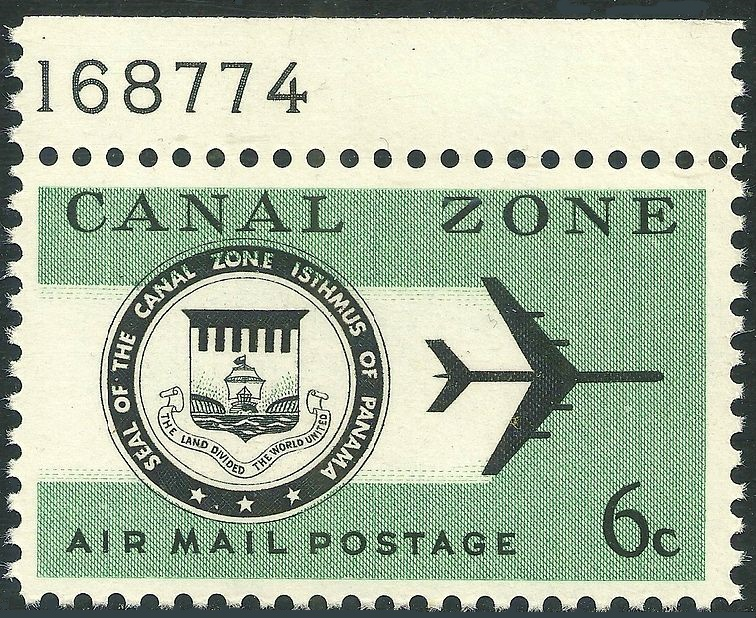
Canal Zone Air Mail, 6c 1965 Issue

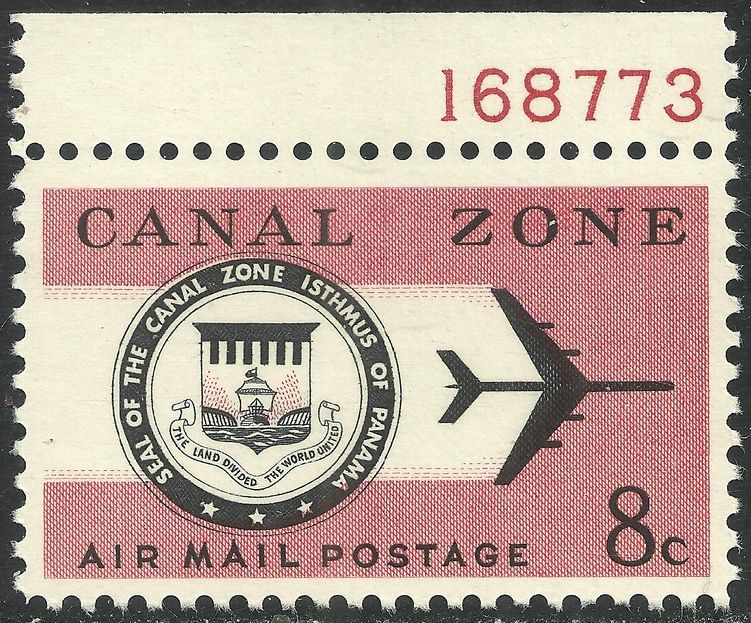
Canal Zone Air Mail, 8c, 1965 Issue

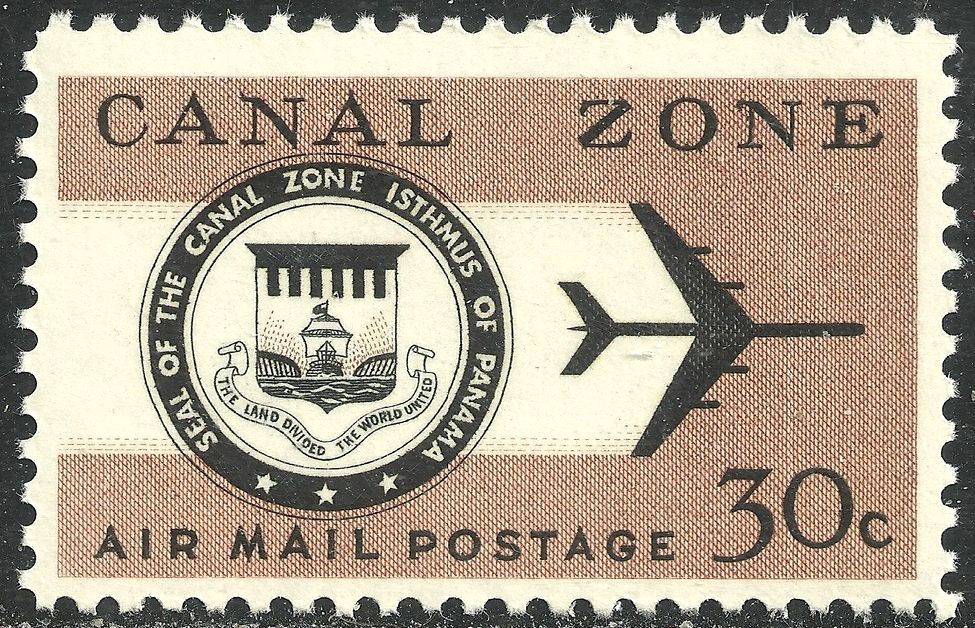
Canal Zone Air Mail, 30c 1965 Issue

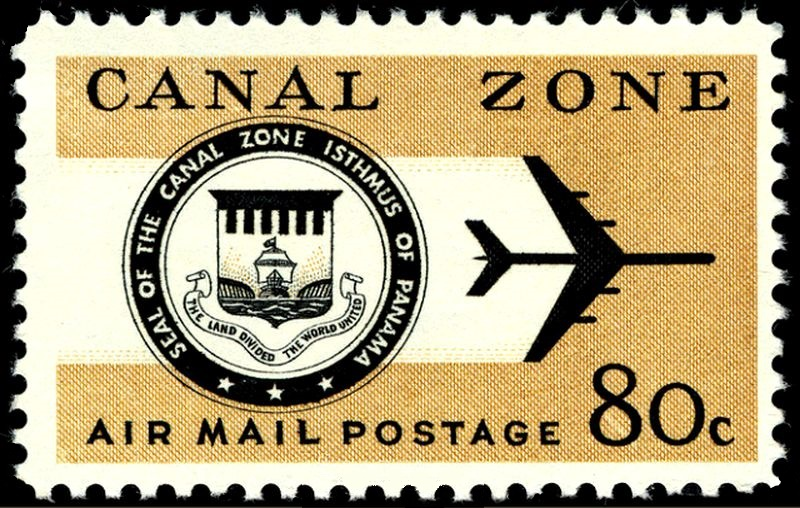
Canal Zone Air Mail, 80c 1976 Issue

== Postage due ==
For several years after the United States assumed authority of the Canal Zone and its post offices, no postage due stamps had yet been issued. Letters that were lacking in sufficient postage when received at the office of delivery were simply hand stamped "postage due", with the appropriate amount due indicated. Prior to its delivery, any such letter was affixed with a postage stamp in the amount of the postage due and then cancelled in the standard fashion. Then in 1908, Gerald D. Bliss, the postmaster at Pedro Miguel post office conceived the idea of precancelling entire sheets of stamps with the postage due cancelling stamp. This was not official method and was done simply to save time. To save time, it soon became necessary to print and use specific Postage Due stamps without having to stop and treat every such letter lacking in sufficient postage. The ten cents stamp was the one most used but all of the denominations of the 1906, 1909 and 1910 issues were precancelled in such a manner. By 1914, Postage Due stamps were finally issued. These were the current Postage Due stamps of the United States, consisting of the denominations of one, two and ten cents overprinted with the words "canal zone" in one line, diagonal fashion along the bottom area of the stamps. The regular issue of U.S. Postage Due stamps were overprinted again in 1925, with a variation in the overprint, with CANAL over the word ZONE. Postmasters in the Canal Zone received strict orders not to sell any of these stamps to the public in unused condition. These orders were apparently followed as none of the unused Postage Due stamps had surfaced.

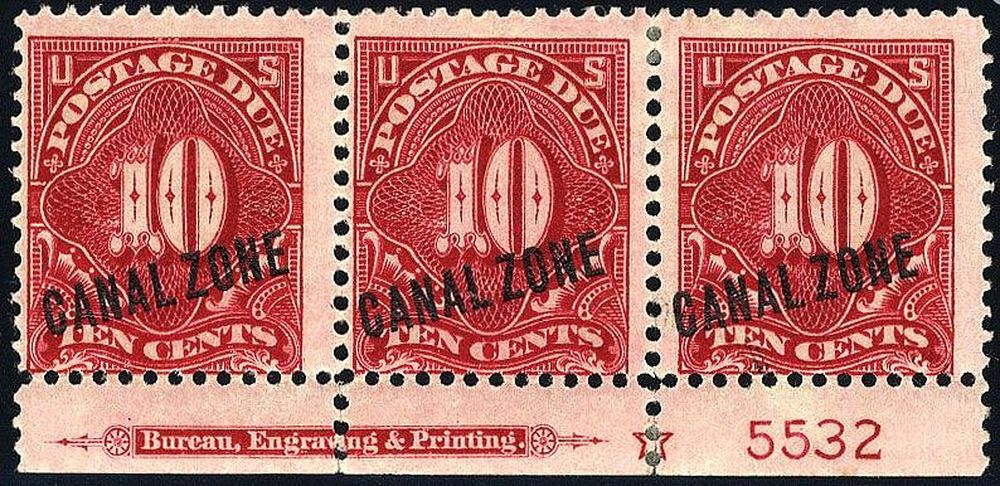
1914 Issue, plate strip of 3

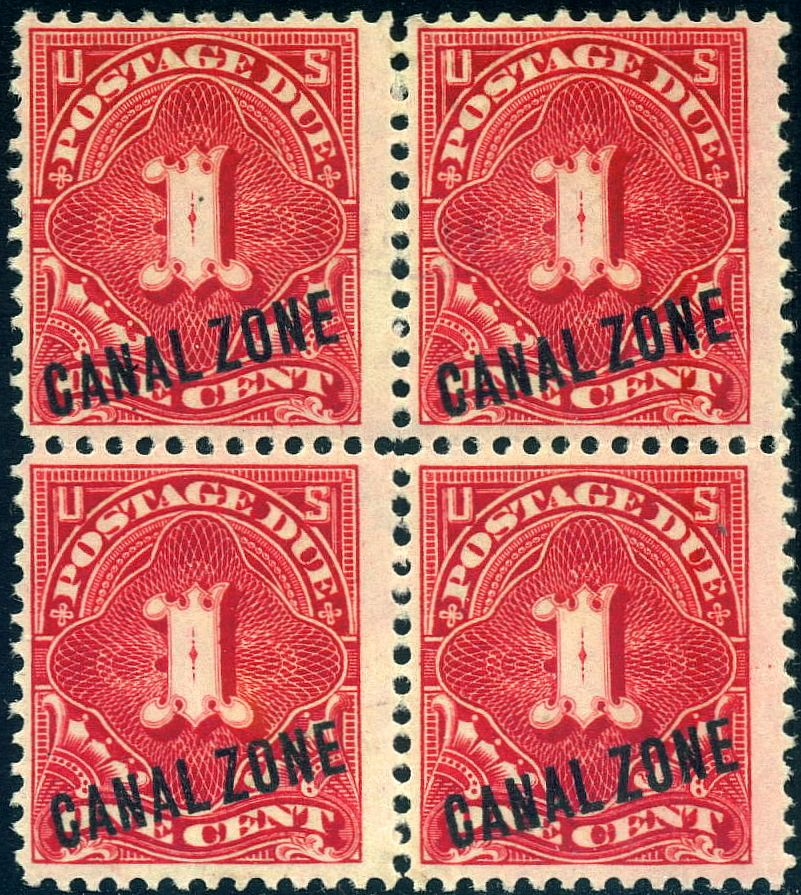
Canal Zone Postage Due stamps, 1915 Issue, made by overprinting U.S regular U.S. Postage Due stamps issued in 1898

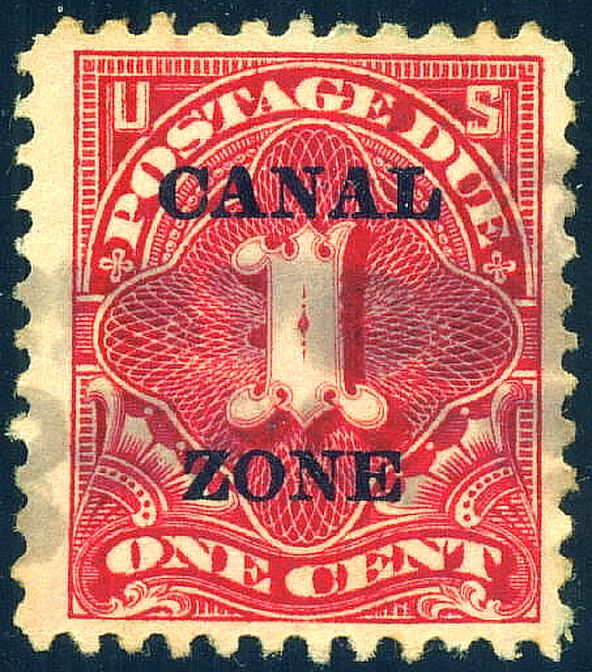
Variation of Canal Zone Postage Due, Issued in 1924

In April 1915, these stamps were replaced by a set of Postage Dues supplied by the Panamanian Government, and those remaining in the post offices were called in and destroyed. The new stamps had a pleasing appearance, consisting of three values: one, two, and ten centesimos de balboa; printed by the American Bank Note Company, all three of these stamps were of the same color, olive brown.

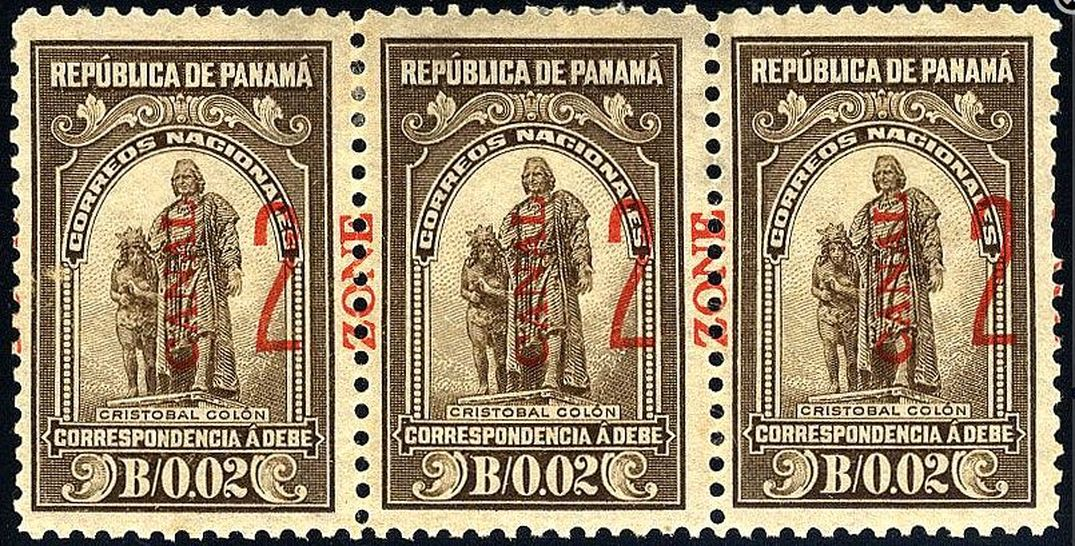
Cristopher Columbus depicted on Postage Due, 1915 Issue Printed by the American Bank Note Company

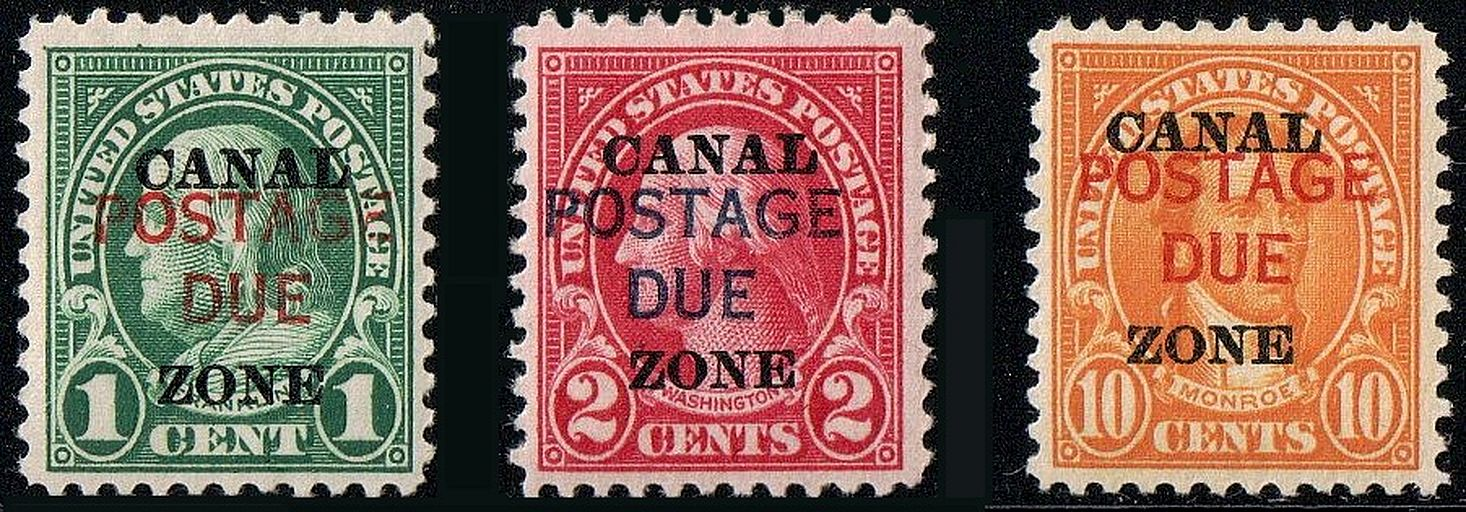
U.S. Regular Issues of 1922 overprinted for use as Canal Zone Postage Due

== Final years ==
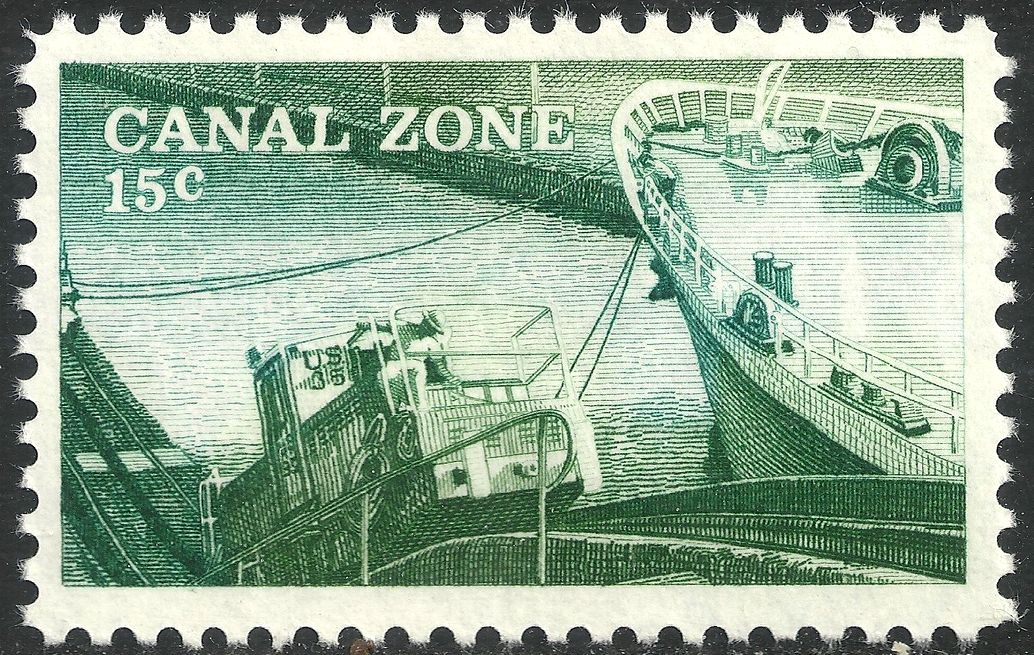
Last stamp issued by the Canal Zone, 1978 Issue

The final years of the Canal Zone saw few stamps issued—those that were issued were mainly for new first-class postal rates (the first-class rates paralleled those of the United States) The last stamp (fifteen cents) of the Zone was issued on October 25, 1978, and depicted one of the towing locomotives and a ship in a lock. Thereafter Panama took over the administration of postal service and, after a brief transition period, Canal Zone stamps became invalid.

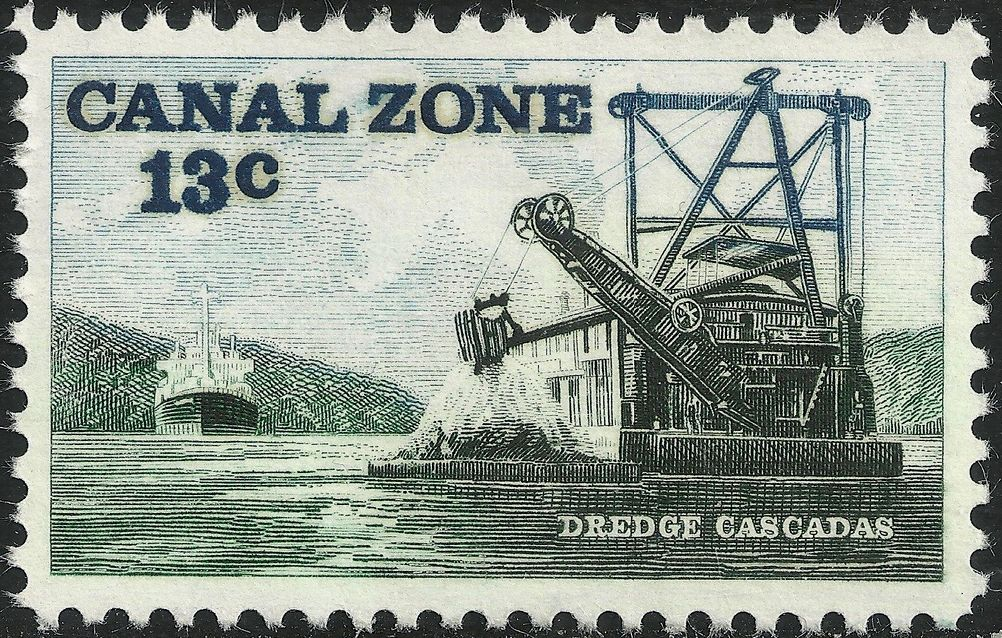
Dredge cascades, 13c, 1976 Issue

=== 1975 reprints ===
In 1975 three stamps originally issued in 1928–1929, and one issued in 1946, were reprinted on the rotary press as coil stamps.

=== 4-cent Thatcher Ferry Bridge ===
A 4-cent Thatcher Ferry Bridge commemorative stamp (Scott 157) was issued on Columbus Day, October 12, 1962, commemorating the opening of the new bridge over the Panama Canal at Balboa. (See below image, left)

Famous error

One pane of fifty stamps was released without the silver ink used to depict the Bridge. This error is likely to have made this issue the most famous Canal Zone stamp. Three additional sheets of this error were discovered in the Philatelic Agency at Balboa, which attempted to print an additional 100,000 copies in an effort to reduce its value to collectors. The sheet was unknowingly sold in a group of 5,000 to a Boston stamp dealer, H.E. Harris, who successfully sued in federal court to stop the additional printing. Today, examples of this famous error are still owned by collectors and are valued at many thousands of dollars. The National Postal Museum is in possession of two of these fifty-stamp sheets. (See below image, right)

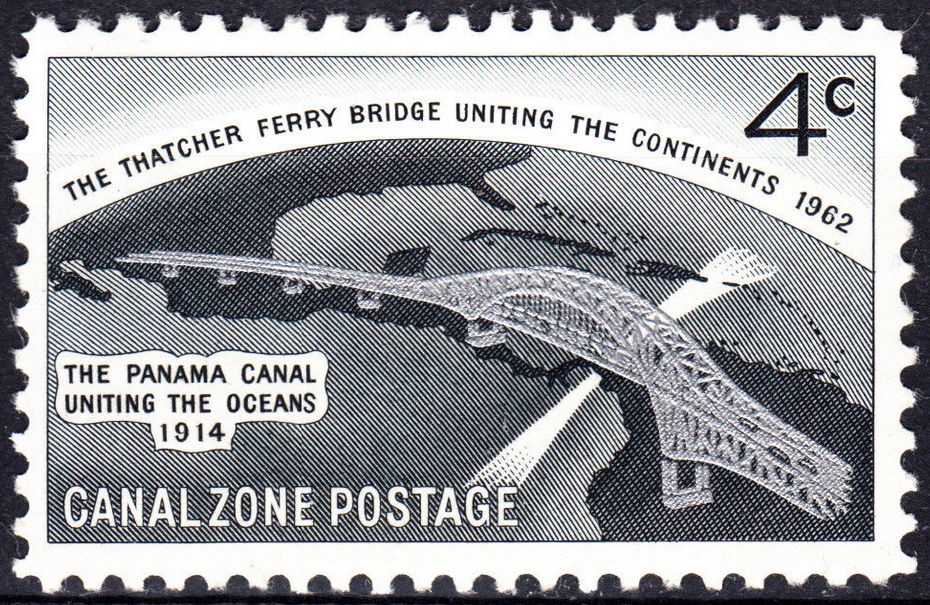
Thatcher Ferry Bridge, 4c, Commemorative Issue of 1962

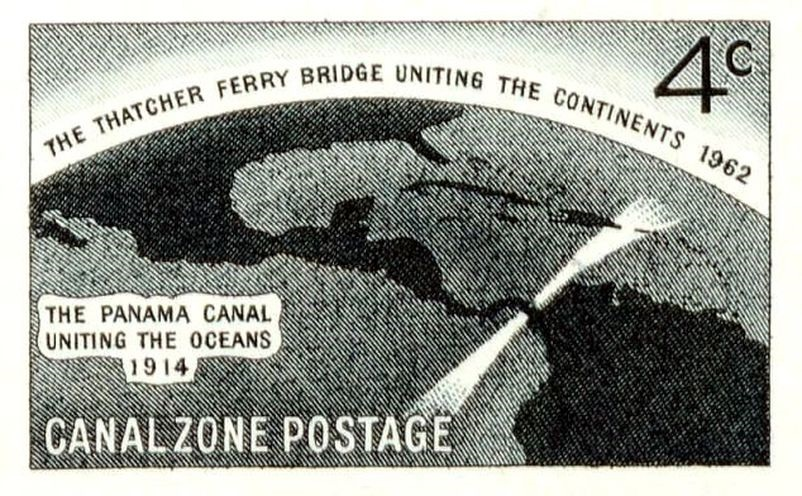
Thatcher Ferry Bridge, printing error, Issue of 1962

== See also ==
- Postage stamps and postal history of the United States
- Revenue stamps of the United States
- Presidents of the United States on U.S. postage stamps
- Postage stamps and postal history of Panama
- History of Panama
- U.S. Postage stamp locator

== Bibliography ==
- Dade, Philip L.; Schay, Gustavo (1949). The Story of Canal Zone Stamps. Dade and Shay.
- James B. Hatcher; William W. Cummings, eds. (1982). Scotts United States Stamp Catalogue. Scotts Publishing Company, New York. ISBN 0894870424.
- Bartles, James Murray (1906). Bartels' check list of Canal Zone stamps. Boston, J.M. Bartels Co.
- Evans, William (1916). The stamps of the Canal Zone. Boston, Severn.
- Karrer, Robert J. (2007). "The Canal Zone Seal & Jet Airmails (1965-1976)". Smithsonian National Postal Museum, Arago.
- Karrer, Robert J. (2007). "4-cent Thatcher Ferry Bridge". Smithsonian National Postal Museum, Arago.
- Karrer, Robert J. (2007). "Gold Rush Centennial (1949)". Smithsonian National Postal Museum, Arago.
- Stanley Gibbons Ltd: various catalogues
- AskPhil – Glossary of Stamp Collecting Terms
- Encyclopaedia of Postal History
- Zemer, David T.; Bates, Richard D. Jr (2002). "Forged Overprints of Canal Zone Stamps" (PDF). The Canal Zone Philatelist. 38 (4): 51–55.
