= Postage stamps and postal history of Panama =

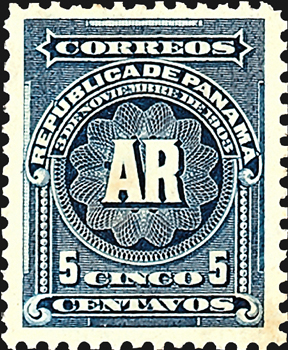
An acknowledgment of receipt stamp of Panama, 1904

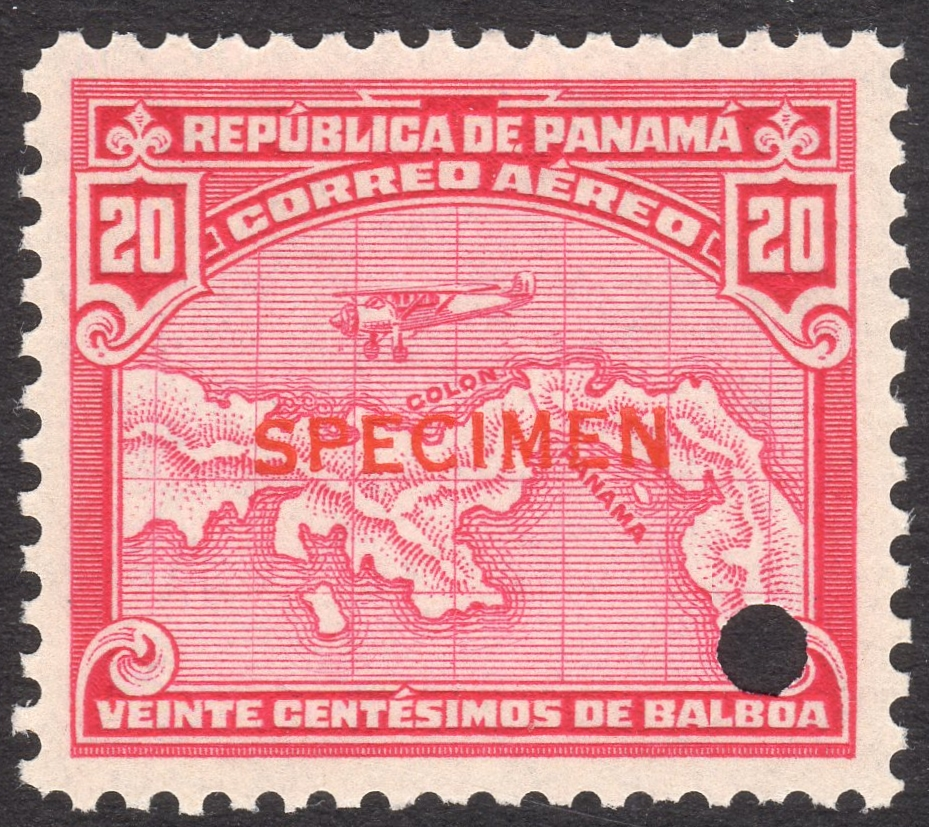
A 1930 20c specimen stamp of Panama for airmail

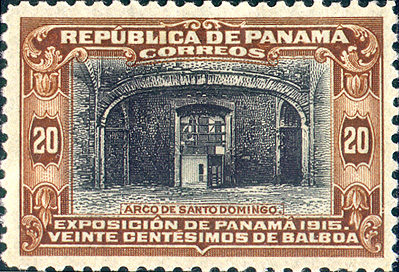
A 1915 stamp of Panama

Panama was formerly a department of Colombia and used overprints of Colombian stamps from 1878 until it gained independence in 1903. However, from 1903 to 1905 sets of stamps with overprints were still used and it was only in 1906 that the first printed stamps by the Panamanian postal administration were produced with República de Panamá.

In 1904, Panama was one of the few countries to issue a stamp for the Avis de réception service.

== Telegraph stamps ==
Panama issued a number of telegraph stamps between 1917 and 1935, most of which were postage or revenue stamps overprinted for telegraphic use. Colombia also issued telegraph stamps for use in Panama before independence but they are not known in used form.

== See also ==
- Postage stamps and postal history of Colombia
- Postage stamps and postal history of the Canal Zone
