= John Findley Wallace =

American engineer and administrator (1852–1921)

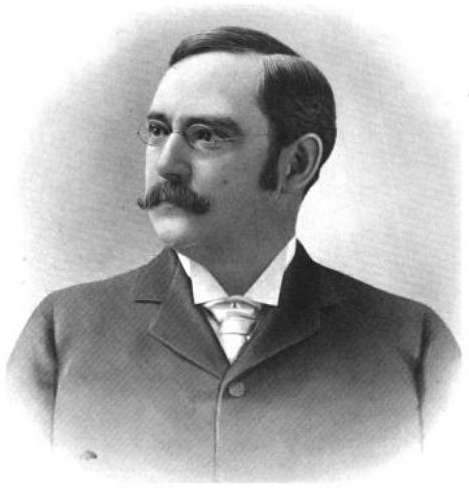
- Born: September 10, 1852; Fall River, Massachusetts
- Died: July 3, 1921 (aged 68); Washington, D.C.
- Resting place: Woodlawn Cemetery, Bronx, New York
- Education: Monmouth College; University of Wooster
- Occupation: Engineer
- Known for: Chief Engineer of the Panama Canal

John Findley Wallace (September 10, 1852 – July 3, 1921) was an American engineer and administrator, best known for serving as chief engineer for construction of the Panama Canal between 1904 and 1905. He had previously gained experience in railroad construction in the American Midwest.

== Biography ==
John Findley Wallace was born September 10, 1852, in Fall River, Massachusetts, the oldest son of the Rev. Dr. David A. and Martha J. (Findley) Wallace. His father, Rev. Dr. David A. Wallace, D.D., LL.D., was the first president of the Monmouth College in Monmouth, Illinois.

John Findley Wallace attended Monmouth College in Illinois and graduated with the class of 1872. He received his degree in civil engineering from the University of Wooster in 1882, and his Sc.D. from the Armour Institute in 1904.

Wallace served as president of the American Society of Civil Engineers in 1900. He began his career at the U.S. Engineering Corps, working on navigation improvements in the Mississippi River near Hampton, Illinois. Wallace also worked at the Burlington, Monmouth & Illinois River Railroad, the Union Pacific Railroad, and the Atchison, Topeka and Santa Fe Railway where he worked on the original Sibley Railroad Bridge over the Missouri River. After starting at the Illinois Central Railroad as an engineer, he was promoted to general manager.

== Panama Canal construction ==
On May 6, 1904, President Theodore Roosevelt appointed Wallace as chief engineer of the ongoing Panama Canal project.

As with the French effort to build the canal before him, malaria, yellow fever, and other tropical diseases plagued the country and further reduced the already depleted workforce. Despite his requests to the contrary, the project was forced to use dilapidated and undersized infrastructure and equipment which had been purchased from the French by the U.S. government. This included primitive steam shovels and an undersized and rusting railway system. The project struggled to make significant progress prior to and during Wallace's appointment.

In an attempt to avoid the inefficiency and corruption that had slowed earlier French efforts, a U.S. government commission, the Isthmian Canal Commission (ICC), was established to oversee construction. However, it proved to be overly bureaucratic and was an impediment to progress. Not initially a member of the seven-man ICC, and in an attempt to streamline its efforts, Wallace was appointed to it when it was reformed and its membership reduced to three following his own recommendation. However, the real solution to the problem would not be found until the appointment of his successor, John Frank Stevens, who often bypassed the commission and sent requests and demands directly to the Roosevelt Administration in Washington; although he too would suddenly resign after two years on the project.

As recommended by a U.S. engineering panel in 1905, Wallace remained an advocate of the concept of a sea-level canal in Panama. To reduce the costs of construction and enable faster completion, this approach was later changed to a reservoir lake and lock system. The new plan would increase operating costs, however, and limit the maximum size of ships able to use the canal.

Wallace was paid $25,000 a year, the second-largest salary in the American government, behind only the president. Despite this, to the Roosevelt administration's chagrin, and claiming to have gotten a lucrative job offer elsewhere, a frustrated Wallace was forced to resign by the Roosevelt administration's William Howard Taft and returned to the mainland United States. Wallace's resignation ultimately led to a better understanding of the difficult nature of the project by the Roosevelt administration, resulting in reforms that included larger, more realistic construction budgets. In 1948 Wallace was commemorated on a Canal Zone postage stamp.

== Post-Panama Canal work ==
Wallace went on to conceive and design the passenger terminal facilities for the Chicago & Northwestern Railway in Chicago from 1905 to 1906. He later served as president of the Electric Properties Company from 1906 to 1914; as president of Westinghouse, Church, Kerr & Company from 1911 to 1916, and chairman of the board of that firm after 1906; and as an engineering expert for the City Council Committee on Railway Terminals of the City of Chicago and chairman of the Chicago Railway Terminal Commission.

Wallace was president of the American Society of Civil Engineers, American Railway Engineering Association, and Western Society of Engineers. He was a Republican and a Presbyterian.

He died in Washington, D.C. on July 3, 1921. Wallace was buried in Woodlawn Cemetery in the Bronx, New York.

== See also ==
- Postage stamps and postal history of the Canal Zone
- Theodore P. Shonts, chairman of the Panama Canal Commission
