= John Frank Stevens =

American civil engineer (1853–1943)

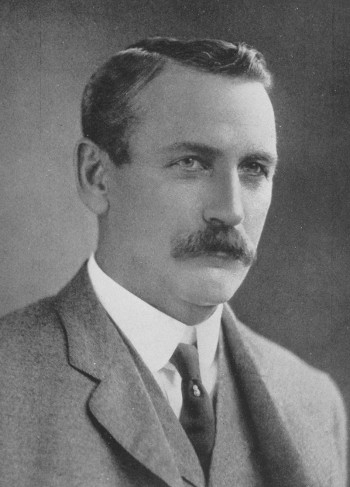
- Born: April 25, 1853; West Gardiner, Maine, United States
- Died: June 2, 1943 (aged 90); Southern Pines, North Carolina, United States
- Education: Western State Normal School, today the University of Maine at Farmington
- Known for: Great Northern Railway, Panama Canal
- Awards: John Fritz Medal (1925); Hoover Medal (1938)

John Frank Stevens (April 25, 1853 – June 2, 1943) was an American civil engineer who built the Great Northern Railway in the United States and was chief engineer on the Panama Canal between 1905 and 1907. He also led the commission of American railway experts to Russia and was later President of the Interallied Technical Board.

== Biography ==
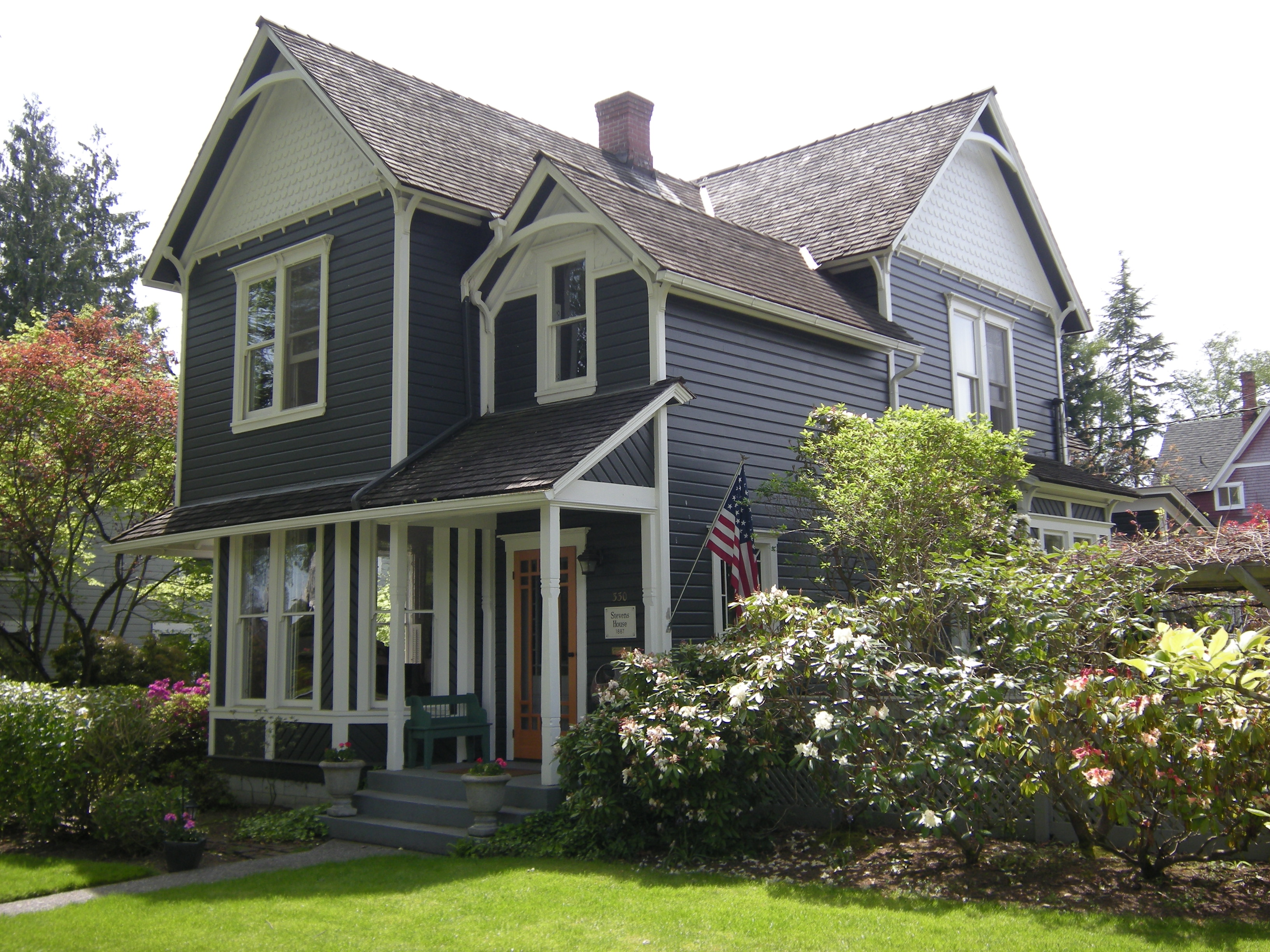
Stevens's home in Snohomish, Washington, built 1887

Stevens was born in rural Maine, near West Gardiner to John Stevens, a tanner and farmer, and Harriet Leslie French. He attended Maine State Normal School (now the University of Maine at Farmington) for two years. At the conclusion of his schooling in 1873, bleak economic conditions held little promise of a job, and he chose to go west. Entry into the field of civil engineering evolved from his experience in the Minneapolis city engineer's office. For two years he carried out a variety of engineering tasks, including surveying and building railroads, and at the same time gained experience and an understanding of the subject. He became a practical engineer, self-taught and driven by a self-described "bull-dog tenacity of purpose." In 1878 Stevens married Harriet T. O'Brien. They had five children, two of whom died in infancy.

By the age of 33, in 1886, Stevens was a principal assistant engineer for the Duluth, South Shore and Atlantic Railway, and in charge of building the line from Duluth, Minnesota to Sault Ste. Marie, Michigan, across the Upper Peninsula of Michigan. Although a large part of his work involved surveying, he assisted in all phases of railroading: reconnaissance, locating, organizing, and construction.

In 1889, Stevens was hired by James J. Hill as a locating engineer for the Great Northern Railway.

Stevens earned acclaim in 1889 when he explored Marias Pass, Montana, and determined its practicability for a railroad. He also discovered a pass through the Cascade Range, Stevens Pass, which bears his name. Stevens set railroad construction standards in the Mesabi Range of northern Minnesota, and supervised the construction of the Oregon Trunk Line. Hill promoted him to chief engineer in 1895, and later to general manager. He was an efficient administrator with remarkable technical skills and imagination. During his time at the Great Northern, Stevens built over a thousand miles of railroad, including the original Cascade Tunnel. (Most other Pacific Northwest landmarks with the word "Stevens" are named after Isaac Stevens, who is of no relation.)

== Panama Canal ==
Stevens left the Great Northern in 1903 for the Chicago, Rock Island and Pacific Railroad, where he was promoted to vice-president. Then, in 1905, at Hill's recommendation, he was hired by United States President Theodore Roosevelt as chief engineer of the Panama Canal.

Stevens's primary achievement in Panama was to build the infrastructure needed for the completion of the canal. "The digging," he said, "is the least thing of all." He proceeded immediately to build warehouses, machine shops, and piers. Communities for the personnel were planned and built to include housing, schools, hospitals, churches, and hotels. He authorized extensive sanitation and mosquito-control programs that eliminated yellow fever and other diseases from the Isthmus.

Reflecting his background, he saw the early stage of the canal project itself as primarily a problem in railroad engineering, which included rebuilding the Panama Railway and devising a rail-based system for disposing of the soil from the excavations. Stevens argued the case against a sea level canal of the kind that the French had tried to build. He convinced Theodore Roosevelt of the necessity of a high-level canal built with dams and locks.

== Resignation ==
Stevens, like his predecessor John Findley Wallace, resigned suddenly from the Canal project in 1907 to Roosevelt's great annoyance, as the focus of the work turned to construction of the canal itself. Even though he had worked closely with the Panama Canal Commission chairman Theodore P. Shonts and was also able to directly approach the Roosevelt Administration with requests for the project, he only spent two years in Panama.

As a railroad engineer, Stevens had little expertise in building locks and dams, and may have realized he was no longer the best person for the remainder of the job. Stevens would also have been aware that the original Cascade Tunnel, for which he was responsible, had been built too close to the ruling grade (maximum gradient for a single locomotive) and was perhaps turning from a credit to a debit. The true reasons for his resignation have never been known.

== Russia (1917–1923) ==
Following the collapse of Imperial Russia in 1917, leaders of the provisional government appealed to President Wilson for help with their transportation systems and overall ability to stay in the war. Stevens was selected to chair a board of prominent U.S. railroad experts sent to Russia to rationalize and manage a system that was in disarray; among his work was updating the Trans-Siberian Railway. Their official mission was to "aid in rehabilitation and conduct of its railways which had become demoralized and broken down and unable to function in any degree of efficiency". The board traveled across Russia on the Trans-Siberian railway and noticed significant amount of inefficiency and made a comprehensive list of suggestions. Russian officials were initially reluctant to implement them, but with Premier Kerensky interventions in September, progress started to happen, but it ended abruptly with the overthrow of the provisional government in the October Revolution. Stevens was awarded the Distinguished Service Medal by the War Department for his service in Russia.

Stevens remained in Allied-occupied Manchuria and in 1919 headed the Inter-Allied Technical Board charged with the administration and operation of the Chinese Eastern and Siberian railways. His position on the board is also to avoid a Japanese takeover of the Chinese Eastern railway. He remained in an advisory capacity even after most occupying Allied troops were withdrawn. He finally left in 1923, after the Imperial Japanese Army left Siberia.

== Subsequent career ==
After his return to the United States Stevens continued to work as a consulting engineer, ending his career in Baltimore in the early 1930s. He was awarded the Franklin Institute's Franklin Medal in 1930.

He then retired to Southern Pines, North Carolina, where he died at the age of 90 in 1943.

His papers are stored at Georgetown University's Special Collections.
