= Gatún =

Town in Colón Province, Panama

Coordinates: 9°16′N 79°55′W

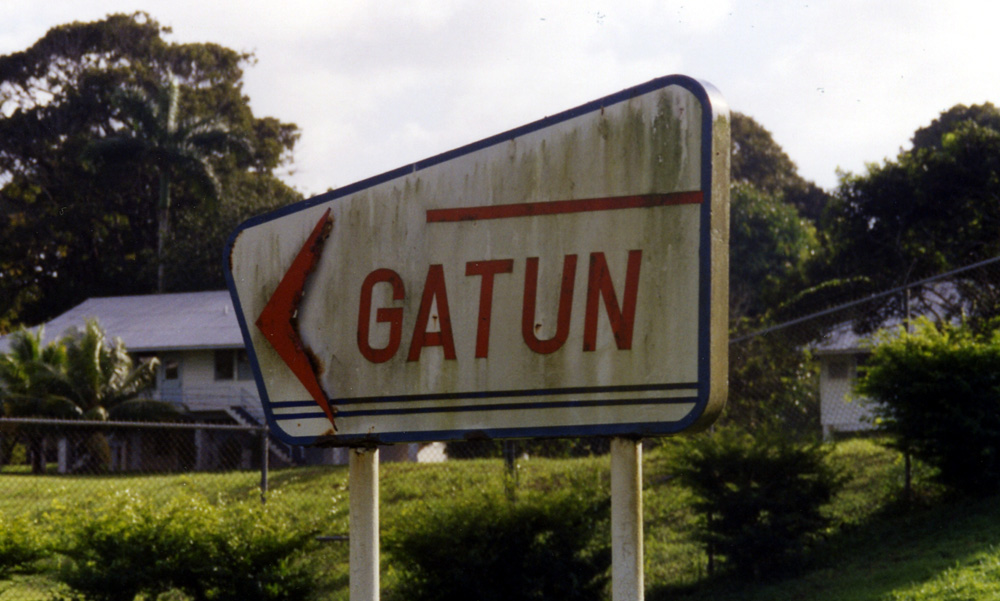
Gatun's Canal Zone style sign, Jadwin Road

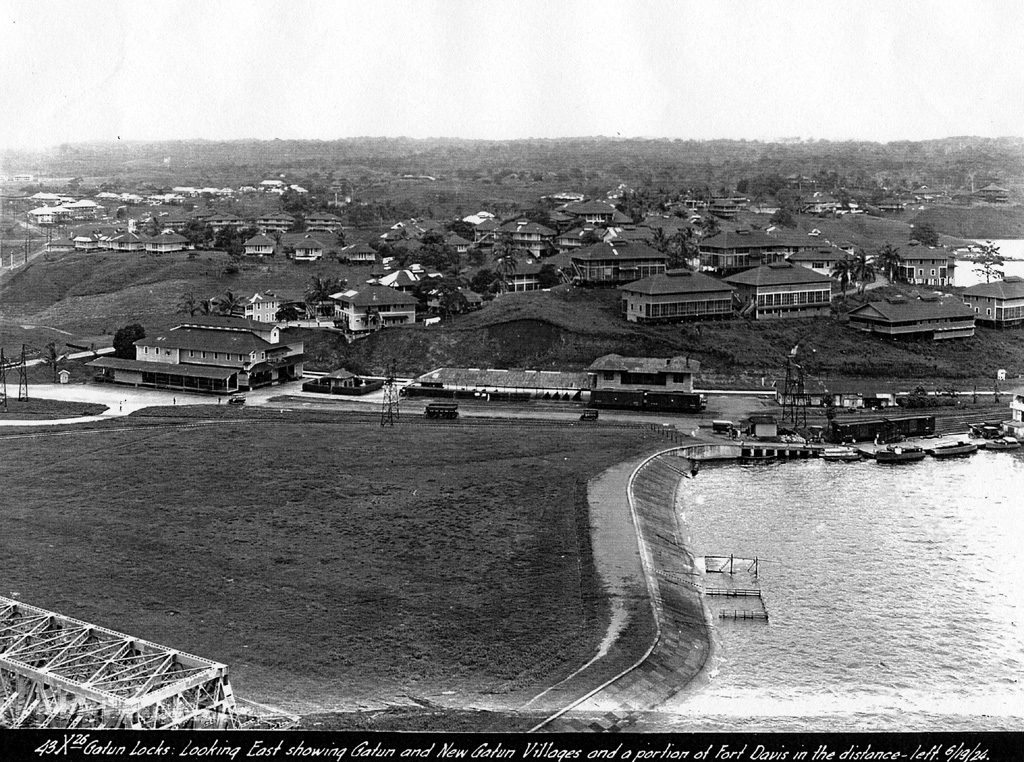
Gatun in June 1924 (seen from the Locks)

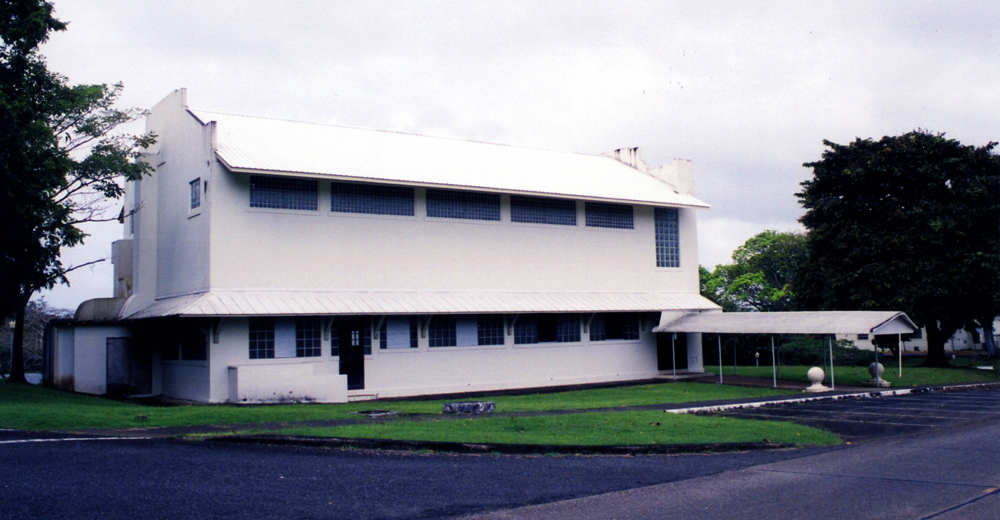
Gatun's former Siebert Lodge, Bldg. 213 on Jadwin Road

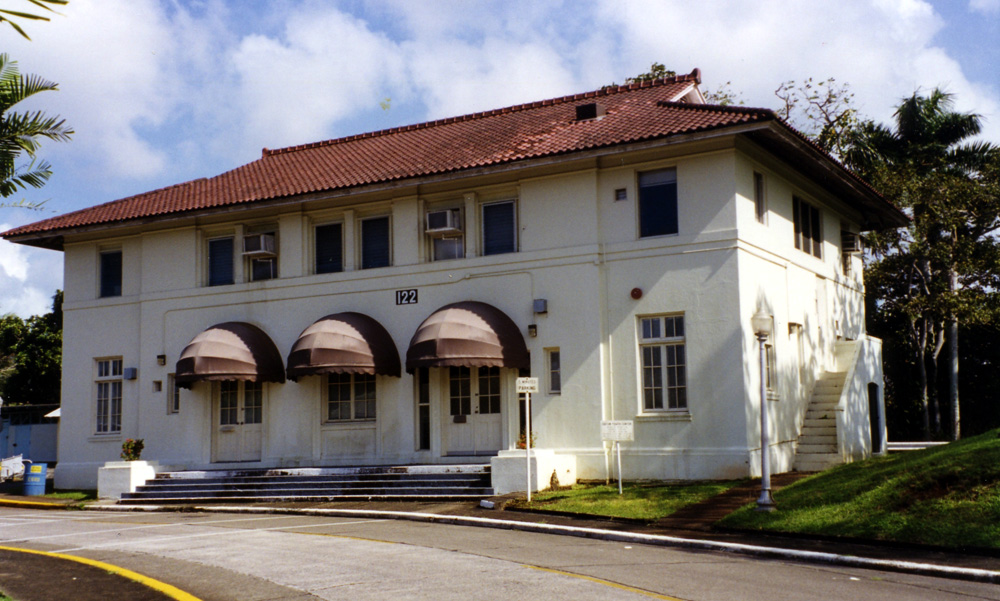
Gatun's former clinic, Bldg. 122 on Bolivar Highway

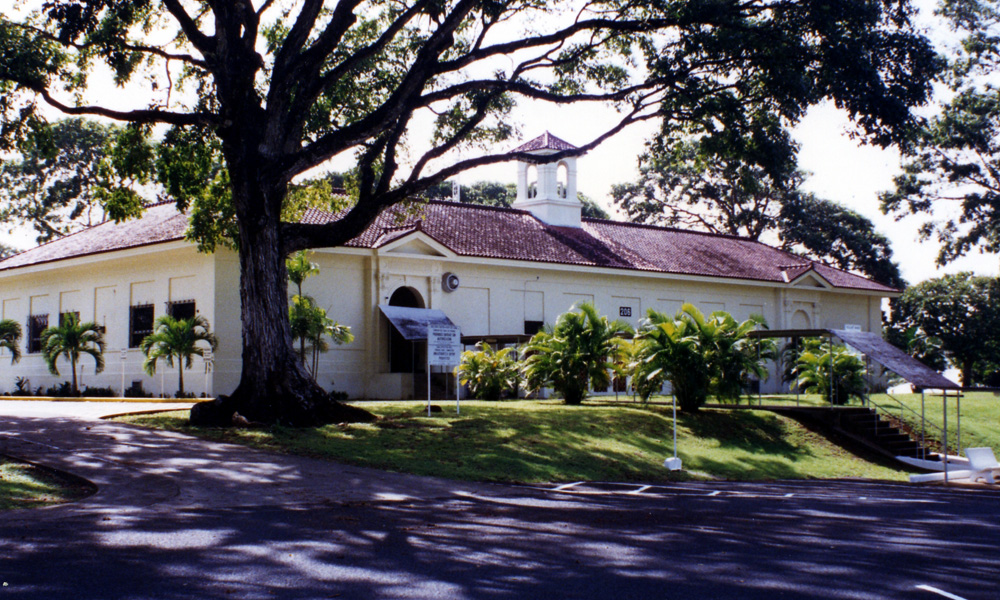
Gatun's former elementary school, #206 on Jadwin Road

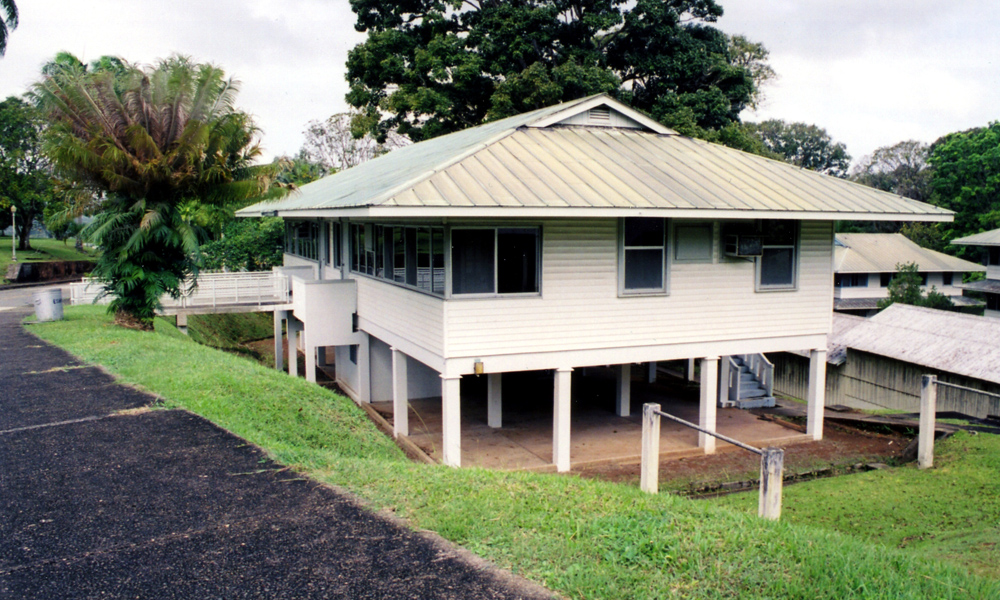
Bldg 115 on Bolivar Highway, a typical Canal Zone house

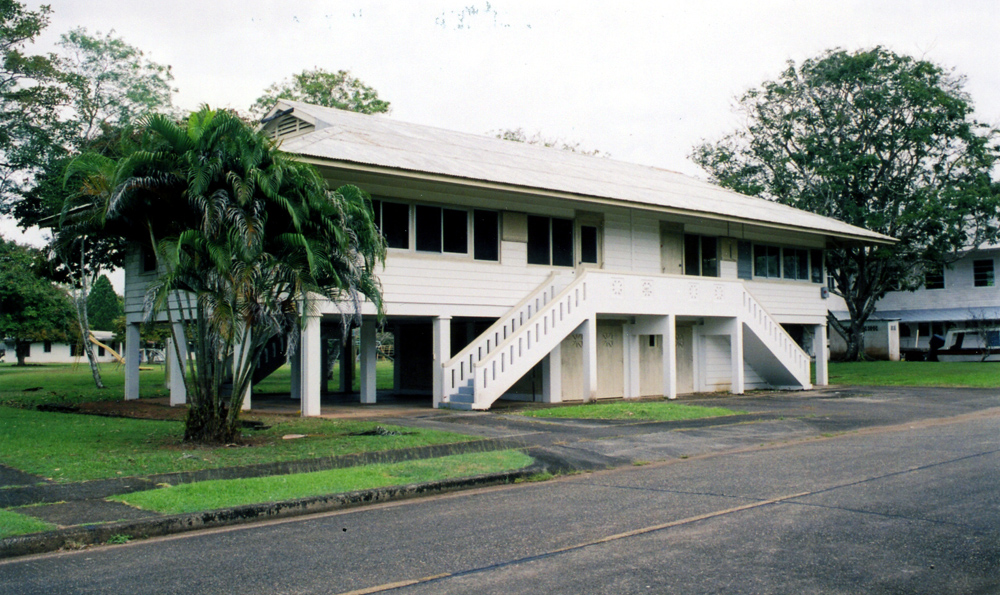
Bldg. 227 on Bolivar Street, another typical C.Z. house

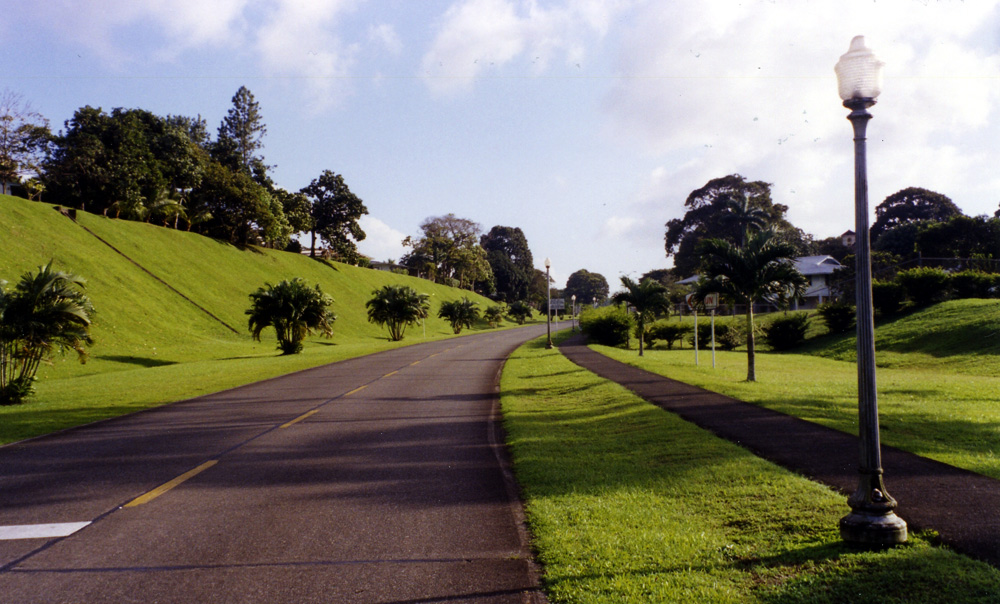
Jadwin Road, at the entrance to the town of Gatun

Gatun (Spanish: Gatún) is a small town on the Atlantic Side of the Panama Canal, located south of the city of Colón at the point in which Gatun Lake meets the channel to the Caribbean Sea. The town is best known as the site of the Panama Canal's Gatun Locks and Gatun Dam, built by the United States between 1906–1914.

== Early history ==
The name “El Gatún” appears in Spanish colonial era maps as the name of a village and river, though it is uncertain when exactly the area was populated or named. The village was located on the west bank of the Chagres River near its present-day location.

In 1671, the British pirate Henry Morgan and his men bivouacked close to Gatún after sacking and burning down the old Panama City.

In the mid-19th century, Gatún was described as a sleepy village whose people lived in 40 or 50 cane huts, on the edge of a broad savannah. On a hill overlooking the river were ruins of an old Spanish fort.

The California Gold Rush of 1849 brought about dramatic changes to the isthmus of Panama, particularly to Gatún. Anxious to speed their passage to northern California, many North Americans and Europeans sailed to the isthmus to undertake an overland journey across it, and board other ships on the Pacific Ocean side headed to ports for the goldfields.

All over Panama, rates for meals and lodging shot up overnight, fueled by increased demand and gold fever. Travelers going upriver on the Chagres stopped through Gatún, paying $2 a night for a hammock before proceeding on the often dangerous barge trip and overland mule ride to Panama City, from where they sailed on to San Francisco.

To meet the demand of travelers rushing to California, a group of New York financiers formed the Panama Railroad Company and set about to construct the first railroad connecting the Atlantic and Pacific. When work began in 1850, ships carried machinery, provisions, and workers up the Chagres as far as Gatún. From there, they worked their way back up through the swamp toward the railroad’s Atlantic terminus on Manzanillo Island (now Colón). The first stretch of rail from Manzanillo Island to Gatun was completed in 1851. Construction was completed in 1854, and the first train completed the journey from coast to coast in January 1855, passing by Gatún.

After 1869, with the completion of the first transcontinental railroad in the United States, traffic on the Panama Railroad decreased. The town’s main role settled as a river trading post for bananas and other crops grown inland and brought by barge to be transported to larger markets by rail.

As with the first gold rush-driven boom, Gatún’s next boom came about rapidly, though not unexpectedly.

In 1881, the Compagnie universelle du canal interocéanique de Panama, led by Count Ferdinand de Lesseps, acquired the rights from Colombia (which also controlled the territory of Panama at the time) to build a canal through the isthmus of Panama to connect passage between the Atlantic and Pacific ocrans. The French company project included its purchase of the majority stake of the Panama Railroad.

To support planned construction, the French shipped in pre-fabricated buildings, many of which were brought to Gatún. French warehouses, quarters, and machine shops went up in Gatún and along the railroad line. The French renamed the town as "Cité de Lesseps."

French excavation works in the area between Limón Bay and Gatún advanced significantly, but by the late 1880s, the effort floundered financially. Thousands of workers had died due to yellow fever and other fatal diseases. After the French suspended their excavation activities, Gatún once again fell quiet.

== Canal construction era ==
In 1904, when the US purchase the French Company’s rights and properties, American engineers and planners arrived at the former Cité de Lesseps to resume long abandoned excavation works. The initial American plan, like the original French plan, was to dam the Chagres at Bohío, 17 miles (27 km) from Colón. However, Chief Engineer John F. Stevens advocated harnessing the Chagres and installing the Atlantic side locks at Gatún, and work began on both of these in 1906.

The new, American Gatun started essentially as a tent city. A plank road was installed and by June 1907, 97 buildings had been erected and work on a commissary was started. In April 1908, the old native village and its inhabitants were moved to an area called "New Town," east of the present town of Gatun. It consisted of over 110 buildings, including a church and about 25 stores. A few months later, Lt. Col. William L. Sibert established the headquarters of the Canal organization's Atlantic Division in Gatun and built his house to the east of the town.

The year 1909 saw significant development for Gatun. A new $25,000 clubhouse was built on a knoll near the present building 122. As excavation works and construction of the locks advanced, the railroad was moved to its present location and construction of a new railroad station and new two-story commissary was begun. The town began to take shape, with schools, a two-story hotel, a post office and telephone exchange, a dispensary, a two-story lodge hall near the clubhouse and new quarters. The American residents of Gatun had also established several active lodges and social clubs.

By March 1913, the population of Gatun was 8,887. Nine months later, it had dropped to 5,943 as the Gatun Dam was completed, the Gatun Locks were operating and only clean-up work remained. An official estimate at the time projected the future population of Gatun at 160 American employees and their families.

== Gatun, CZ ==
After the completion of the Panama Canal in 1914, the Canal Zone’s population was expected to decrease sharply. During the early 1920s, there was some talk of abandoning Gatun altogether, but in 1928, new quarters were built for 164 “local-rate” families. In 1932, plans to replace most of Gatun’s old housing were approved and grading for the $1,250,000 project began on January 31, 1934. Buildings came down right and left to make way for more permanent wood and masonry buildings.

Just a few years after Gatun’s refurbishment, on August 11, 1939, the U.S. Congress authorized the immediate construction of the long studied "Third Locks Project". For Gatun, this meant excavation of a new canal about half a mile to the east of the existing canal. This construction would have made Gatun an island between two sets of locks.

During the war, the Gatun Locks were surrounded by solid 26-foot corrugated metal steel fences and barrage balloons were anchored overhead. Buildings or part of buildings which might be fire hazards were torn down to prevent them from burning and lighting the locks. Lights were out by 11:00 p.m., street lights were removed and cars drove with blacked-out headlights. Air raid shelters were built and air raid drills held. By 1944, as the war receded to the Pacific and Gatun and the Canal Zone returned to its normal way of life, artillery positions were reused for various buildings and the bomb shelters were still in many backyards.

On March 31, 1944, just 35 years after its first clubhouse was built, a new clubhouse was inaugurated. At the time, it was called the “newest and most complete of any in the clubhouse system.” The building eventually also housed the “U.S.-rate” commissary and post office. A local-rate commissary and clubhouse was also combined in the segregated portion of Gatun known as Chagres.

Gatun from the 1940s to 1970s was known for its active Civic Council, its many active hobbyists and its Tarpon Club. The Gatun area was home to three horseman's clubs: Gatun Saddle Club located right by town, Atlantic Saddle Club located just outside town and Mindi Acres, located adjacent to Ft. Davis. These were members of the Canal Zone Horsemen's Association, which hosted many horse sporting shows and events. The CZHA organized yearly shows and events which climaxed in the Championship show hosted by the Abu Saad Shriners.

The Tarpon Club, first organized in 1914, started as the Gatun Fishing Club and was allowed to construct a clubhouse in 1915. Over the years, its guests included Presidents Theodore Roosevelt and Franklin Delano Roosevelt as well as ex-King Leopold III of Belgium. The Tarpon Club is one of the few remaining Gatun institutions which remains today.

== Present-day Gatún ==
Today, most of Gatún is a virtual ghost town, administered and maintained by the Panama Canal Authority (ACP). The eastern part of town, formerly called "New Town," has been demolished to make way for the Panama Canal Expansion Project's expanded third locks channel. Many cruise passengers and tourists visit or pass by the Gatun Locks but do not venture into town to appreciate its remaining Canal Zone style architecture. The former clinic, school, swimming pool and fire station are used by the ACP, but the old Sibert Lodge is no longer active.

== Gatun and Gatun Lake Benefits ==
Created in 1913 by the damming of the Chagres River, Gatun Lake is an essential part of the Panama Canal which forms a water passage between the Atlantic Ocean and the Pacific Ocean, permitting ship transit in both directions. At the time it was formed, Gatun Lake was the largest man-made lake in the world. Lake Gatun encompasses approximately 180 square miles (470 km^{2}), a vast tropical ecological zone part of the Atlantic Forest Corridor and Eco-tourism on Gatun Lake has become a worthwhile industry for Panamanians. This impassable rain-forest around Gatun Lake has been the best defense of the Panama Canal and today these areas have endured practically unscathed by human interference and are one of the few accessible areas on earth that various native Central American animal and plant species can be observed undisturbed in their natural habitat. Barro Colorado Island is the largest island on Gatun Lake and home to the world famous Barro Colorado Tropical Research Institute which was established for scientific study in 1923, shortly after the lake was formed. Today the research and nature reserve are operated by the Smithsonian Institution. Many of the most important ground breaking scientific and biological discoveries of the tropical animal and plant kingdom originated here. Gatun Lake also serves to provide the millions of gallons of water necessary to operate the Panama Canal locks each time a ship passes through and provides drinking water for Panama City and Colon.

Angling is one of the primary recreational pursuits on Gatun Lake. It is suspected that the Cichla Monoculus clade Cichla Pleiozona species of Peacock Bass was introduced by accident to Gatun Lake by a renowned Panamanian aquarist and doctor in 1958. Locally called Sargento these peacock bass are not a native game fish of Panama but originate from the Amazon, Rio Negro and Orinoco river basins of South America where they are called Tucanare or Pavon and are considered a premier game fish. Since 1958, the species of Peacock Bass have flourished to become the dominant angling game fish in Gatun Lake of the Panama Canal. The aggressive fish are considered very desirable by anglers. They hit topwater lures, subsurface lures imitating baitfish, and a variety of fly patterns. When hooked, they perform admirably, generating a respectable fight on appropriate tackle. Oddly, they have a preference for feeding during daylight hours. Lake Gatun remains to this day, as it has been for more than 50 years, one of the best peacock bass angling lakes in the world.

== See also ==
- Postage stamps and postal history of the Canal Zone
