= Isla Tres Perros =

Native name: Tres Perros
- Interactive map of Isla Tres Perros

Geography
- Location: Panama
- Coordinates: 9.03655°N 79.956°W
- Area: 22,745 m^{2} (244,830 sq ft)
- Highest elevation: 34 m (112 ft)

Administration
- Panama

Demographics
- Demonym: Panamanian
- Ethnic groups: Mestizo, mulatto, Amerindian.

Isla Tres Perros is a Panamanian island with an area of 22,745 m^{2} (244,830 sq ft) located near the channel of the Panama Canal in the southwest region of the Gatun Lake. The Island was created when the waters of the Chagres River were dammed by the Gatun Dam to create the Gatun lake. When the waters rose, they covered a significant part of the existing rainforest, and the hilltops became the islands that are now scattered throughout the lake.

== History ==
Isla Tres Perros was known locally by other names prior to 1989; since it didn’t officially have a name, residents of other islands all referred to it differently. It wasn’t until 1989 that the island received its current name, which most locals know it by, Isla Tres Perros, Island of the Three Dogs. The island took on this name when three key military officers from the failed 1989 coup took refuge to avoid the military, CPT Jorge Bonilla Arboleda, CPT Juan Jose Arza Aguilera and CPT Jesús Balma.

The three military officers, all graduates of the School of the Americas, supported Major Giraldi’s coup attempt, to overthrow Noriega, but when the coup fell apart and conspirators were rounded up and summarily executed, the three young officers went on the run and found themselves held out on Isla Tres Perros, when their boat ran out of gas. Due to the survival skills they had earned through Special Forces and Infantry training, they were able to survive on the small island for three weeks before the Panamanian military finally hunted them down and executed them for treason.

Once the story of the three “fugitive” military officers became public, people began to call it Isla Tres Perros, or Island of the Three Dogs. The story was spurred on by a pro Noriega reporter at La Prensa newspaper.

== Notables ==
The journalist Escolastico Calvo has been known to live on the island briefly before the United States invasion of Panama to avoid persecution because of his pro Noriega support and printing Noriega propaganda in the Panamanian newspaper La Hora. When Calvo arrived, there was one family living on the island. He found his way to the island from the fishing town of Arensoa, which is about 500m from the island. From first hand accounts of the family, they stated that he was living on the island for sometime, but the exact length could never be determined as he had bribed them to stay quiet and to prevent his discovery. During his time on the island he had contracted Typhoid and fell ill and became very weak. He was treated by the locals and then finally discovered by the US government Special Forces during the Invasion of Panama.

The movie The Lost Tribe (2010) was partially filmed on the Island, as well as the made-for-television movie Noriega: God's Favorite (2000).

== See also ==
- The Panama Deception
