= Madden Dam =

Dam in Panama

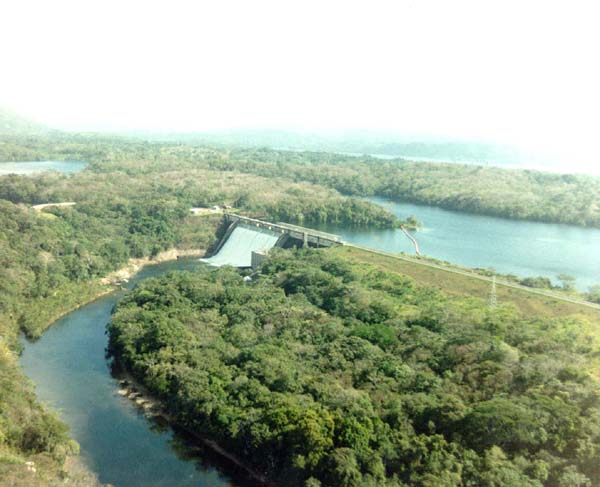
- Madden Dam in 1989
- Interactive map of Madden Dam
- Country: Panama
- Coordinates: 9°12′40″N 79°36′59″W
- Opening date: 1935

Dam and spillways
- Height: 67 m (220 ft)
- Length: 274 m (899 ft)

Reservoir
- Creates: Lake Alajuela

Power Station
- Commission date: 1935
- Turbines: 3 x 12 MW (16,000 hp) Francis-type
- Installed capacity: 36 MW (48,000 hp)

Madden Dam, completed in 1935, impounds the Chagres River in Panama to form Lake Alajuela, a reservoir that is an essential part of the Panama Canal drainage basin. The lake has a maximum level of 250 feet (76 m) above sea level. It can store one third of the canal's annual water requirements for the operation of the locks. Since the reservoir is not part of the navigational route, there are fewer restrictions on its water level.

The Madden Dam was built to prevent the occasionally torrential flow of the once wild Chagres River, which flows into the navigational route of Gatun Lake, and to control the water level of the lake during the dry season. The river's unruly flow posed a major challenge to the construction of the Panama Canal, which was originally addressed by the construction of Gatun Dam. Water from the dam's reservoir is also used to generate hydroelectric power and to supply Panama City's fresh water. When completed, the dam and the reservoir behind it were named for the late US Representative Martin B. Madden (R-Illinois). The reservoir was renamed Lake Alajuela after the Canal Zone reverted to Panamanian control at the end of 1999.

== See also ==
- List of power stations in Panama
