= San Lorenzo Protected Area =

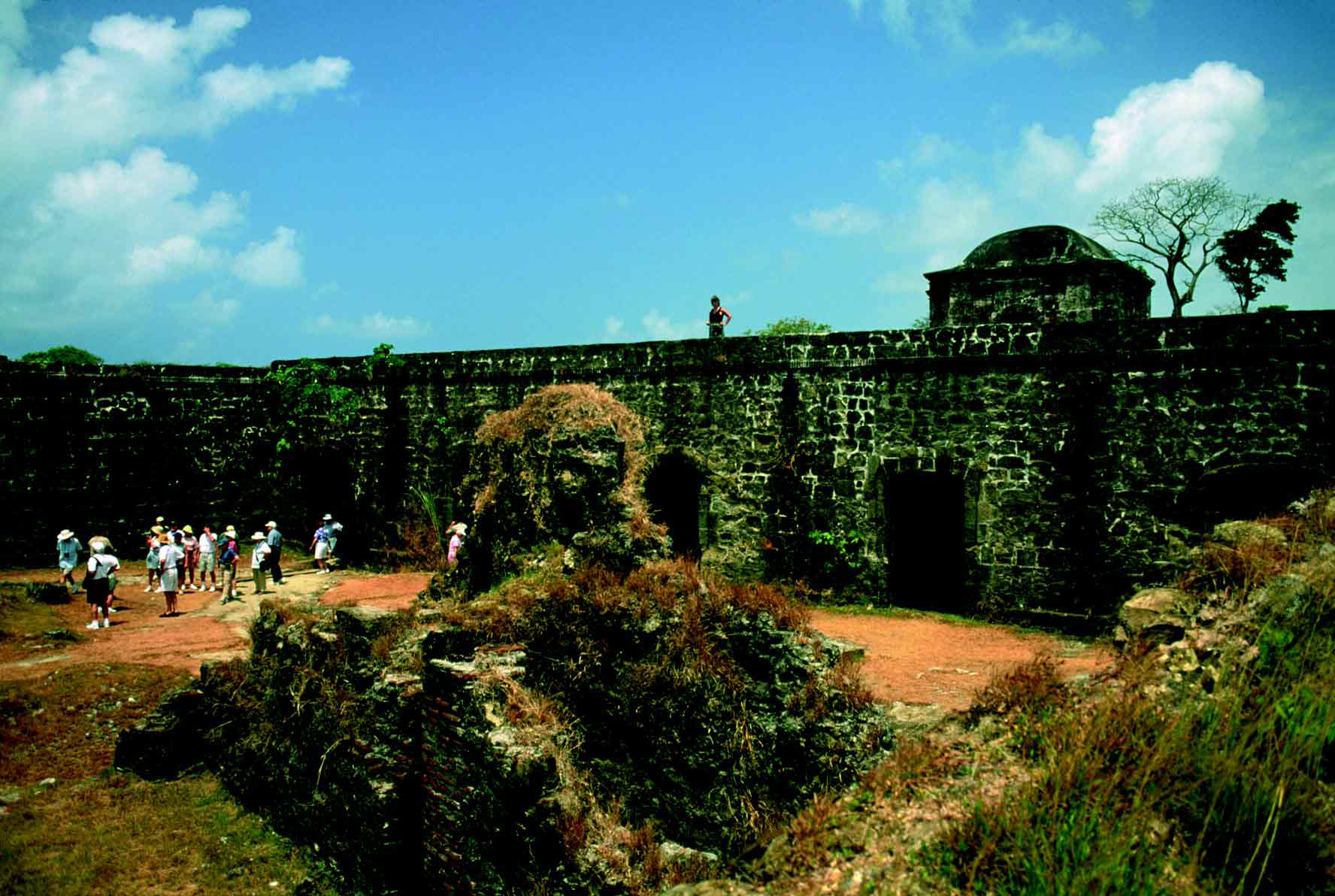
Fort San Lorenzo

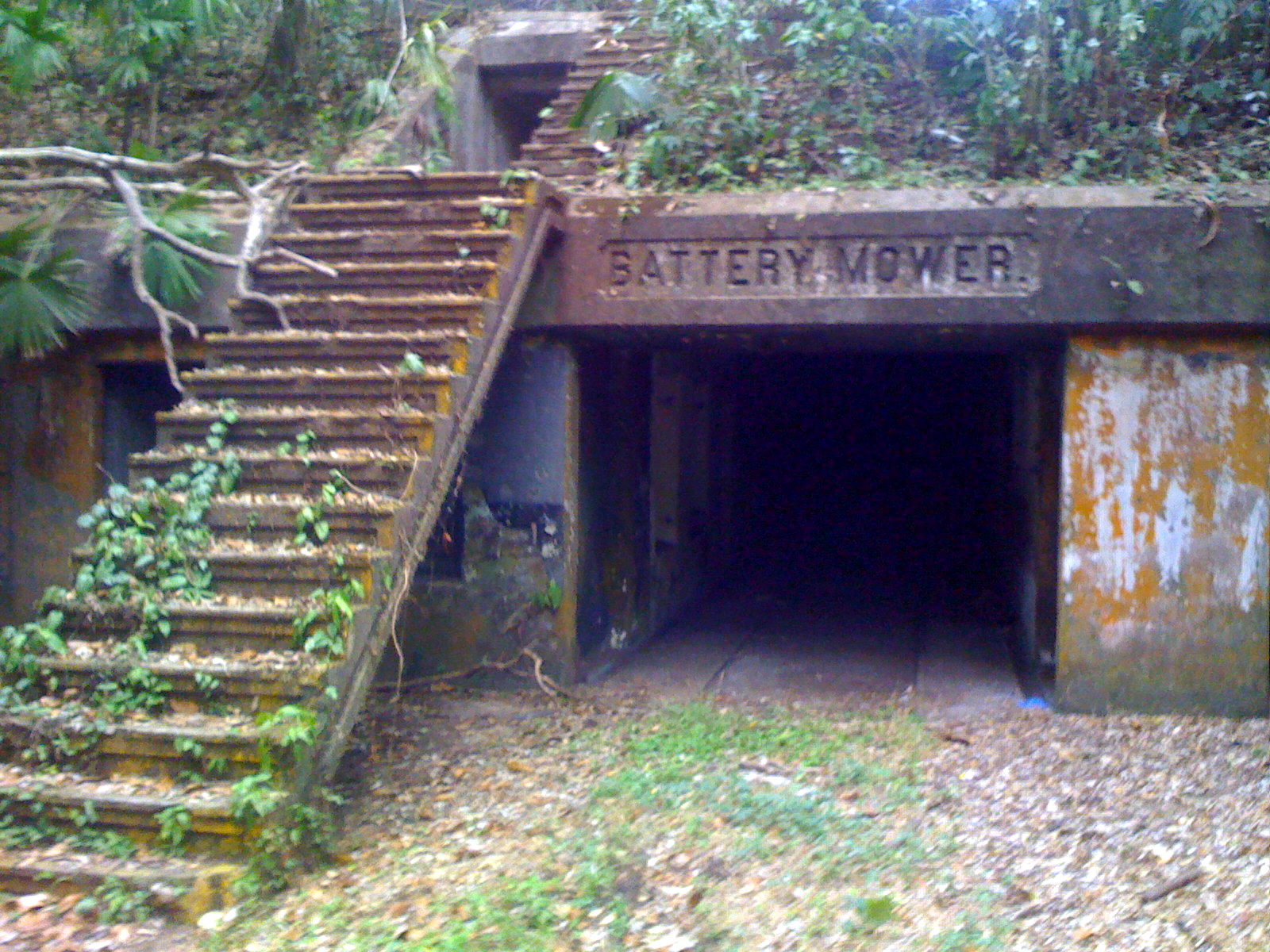
Fort Sherman

San Lorenzo Protected Area (SLPA; "Area Protegida San Lorenzo") is a 12,000-ha area in Panama. It includes Fort San Lorenzo and Fort Sherman. At its longest point, is measures 24 kilometres (15 mi) from "Toro Point to the town of Escobal". The widest point of its width measures 11 kilometres (6.8 mi) "from the southeastern corner of Limón Bay to the beaches northeast of the town of Piña". All areas of the SLPA were returned to Panama on June 30, 1999.

Major physiographic features of the SLPA include Fort Sherman uplands, Mindi Hills, Piña-Escobal highlands, Chagres-Mojinga-Gatún lowlands, Limón Bay lowlands, Caribbean shore lowlands, and the Chagres River. The major roads and trails in the SLPA include Gatún Locks-Escobal Road, Gatún Locks-Sherman Road, Piña Road, Sherman-San Lorenzo Road, and Tower Road. Rivers and streams include, Aguadulce Arenal, Arenoso, Buena Vista, Chagres, Congo, Crematorio, Grande, Iglesias, Indio, Mojinga, Medio, Morito, Narajitos, Negrita, Paulino, Petitpie, Piña, Providencia, and Trienticinco.

== See also ==
- Protected areas of Panama
- Panama Canal Zone
