= Lake Alajuela =

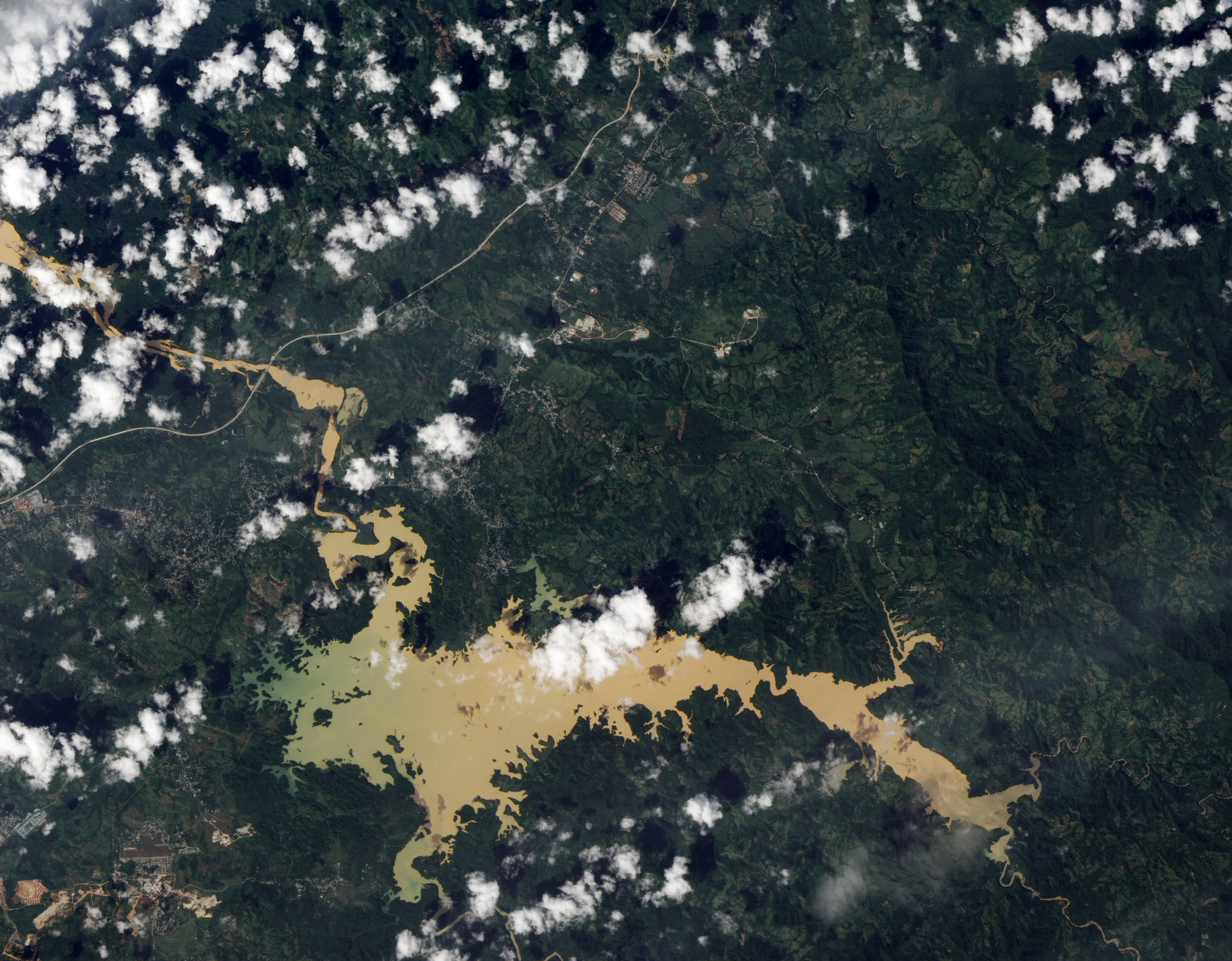
- Natural-color satellite image of Lake Alajuela

- Location within Panamá Province
- Location: Panamá Province, Panama
- Coordinates: 9°14′04″N 79°34′32″W
- Lake type: Reservoir
- Primary outflows: Panama Canal
- Catchment area: 1,026 km^{2} (396 sq mi)
- Basin countries: Panama
- Surface area: 50.2 km^{2} (19.4 sq mi)
- Water volume: ca. 600 hm^{3} (2.1×10^{10} cu ft))
- Surface elevation: 76.8 m (252 ft)

Location within Panama

Lake Alajuela (Spanish: Lago Alajuela) is an artificial lake in the Chagres River basin in central Panama. The lake is bounded by the Madden Dam and linked to the Panama Canal. Lake Alajuela serves as a reservoir for the canal, which lies to the lake's southwest.

== History ==
The lake was created in 1935 by damming up the Madden River. The Chagres, Pequení, Boquerón, Salamanca, La Puente, Indio, Piedras, San Cristóbal and Escandaloso rivers flow into the lake. The rivers of Lake Alajuela contribute 45 percent of the total water for the canal. As of 1987, it provided all of the drinking water for Panama City.

The reservoir was formerly known as Madden Lake when the Canal Zone was under U.S. administration and was renamed after control of the canal was handed over to Panama.

In early December 2010, Lake Alajuela reached its highest recorded water level, prompting authorities to close the Panama Canal for 17 hours. The canal reopened on December 9.

In late August 2023, the lake was reported to be at its lowest levels in recent years, limiting Panama Canal traffic.
