= Isla Gatun, Panama =

Private island in Panama

Coordinates: 9.049°N 79.955°W

Isla Gatun is a private island located in the middle of the Panama Canal in the southwest of Gatun Lake, which was the largest man-made lake in the world at the time it was built. The island has an area of 2,994 m^{2} (32,230 sq ft). The island is ringed with trees and foliage but the center is barren. There are no known indigenous people residing on the island; however, small animals such as monkeys, parrots, toucans and tapirs do inhabit the island. The island is currently for sale for the price of $30,000; however, much like 95% of Panamanian islands, it is not titled and is only available with a Right of Possession. Isla Gatun is 820 metres (2,690 ft) northwest of the small fishing village Arenosa. The village Arenosa also has a small marina, restaurants, and cell phone reception.
