= Marixa Lasso =

Panamanian historian and author

- Lasso in 2023
- Born: August 2, 1968 (age 58)
- Occupations: Historian, author
- Awards: Friedrich Katz Prize in Latin American and Caribbean History, William M. LeoGrande award

Marixa Lasso (born August 2, 1968) is a Panamanian historian and author of two books. She currently works at Universidad Nacional de Colombia.

== Academic career ==
Lasso was an Associate Professor at Case Western Reserve University. She is currently an Associate Professor of history at Universidad Nacional de Colombia.

Lasso first book was published in 2007 under the title Myths of Harmony. It focuses on the creation of racial divisions in Latin America during the 19th century.

In 2016, Lasso was a research fellow at the Hutchins Center for African and African American Research in Harvard.

Her 2019 book, Erased: The Untold Story of the Panama Canal, was originally titled The Lost Towns of the Canal Zone. It was produced with Harvard University Press and covers the US-Panama relations, particularly the depopulation of the Panama Canal Zone. Erased won two prizes: the Friedrich Katz Prize in Latin American and Caribbean History, as well as the William M. LeoGrande award from American University. The book was translated into Spanish and Chinese.

In spring 2025, Lasso was Tinker Visiting Professor at UT Austin, teaching a seminar entitled "The Tropics and the Tropical City in Latin America".

== Books ==
- Myths of Harmony: Race and Republicanism during the Age of Revolution, Colombia 1795-1831 (2007)
- Erased: The Untold Story of the Panama Canal (2019)
