= Gatun Lake =

Panamanian freshwater artificial lake

- Interactive map of Gatun Lake
- Coordinates: 9.2°N 79.9°W
- Type: Artificial lake
- Primary inflows: Chagres River
- Catchment area: 2,313 square kilometres (2.490×10^{10} ft^{2})
- Basin countries: Panama
- First flooded: June 27, 1913
- Surface area: 431 km^{2} (166 sq mi)
- Average depth: 12.7 metres (42 ft)
- Water volume: 5.48 km^{3} (4,440,000 acre⋅ft)
- Residence time: 1 yr
- Shore length^{1}: 1,750 kilometres (1,090 mi)
- Surface elevation: 26 m (85 ft)
- Islands: Isla Barro Colorado, Isla Gatun, Isla Falta Calzado, Isla Tres Perros
- ^{1} Shore length is not a well-defined measure.

Gatun Lake (Spanish: Lago Gatún) is a mostly freshwater (slightly saline near the locks) reservoir to the south of Colón, Panama. At approximately 26 m (85 ft) above sea level, it forms a major part of the Panama Canal, carrying ships 33 km (21 mi) of their transit across the Isthmus of Panama. It was created June 27, 1913 when the gates of the spillway at Gatun Dam were closed. The water level was about 14.6 m (48 ft) above sea level and was expected to fill to operating levels in the next six months.

== Construction ==
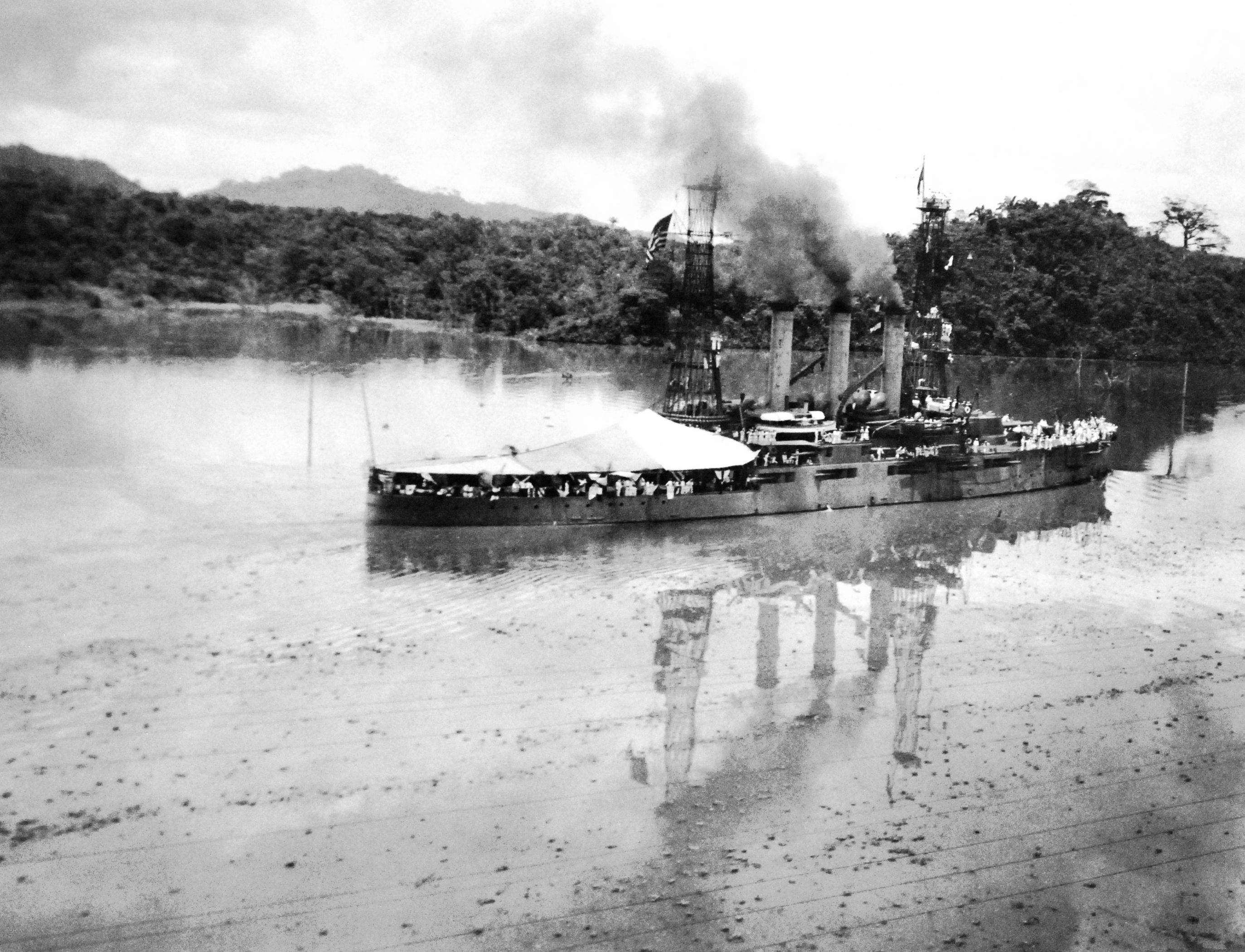
USS Missouri (Battleship #11) in Gatun Lake, Panama Canal, 1915.

Created in 1913 by damming the Chagres River, Gatun Lake is a key part of the Panama Canal, providing the millions of litres of water necessary to operate its locks each time a ship passes through. When constructed, Gatun Lake was the largest artificial lake in the world.

== Geography ==
Gatun Lake covers about 470 km^{2} (180 sq mi). There is impassable rainforest around the lake and these areas remain practically free from human interference. There are a few accessible areas where various native Central American animal and plant species can be observed undisturbed in their natural habitat.

The largest island in the lake is Barro Colorado Island, which was established for scientific study when the lake was formed, and is operated by the Smithsonian Institution. Many important scientific and biological discoveries of the tropical animal and plant kingdom originated here.

Gatun Lake also provides drinking water for Panama City and Colón.

=== Fishing ===
Angling is one of the primary recreational pursuits on Gatun Lake. Non-native peacock bass were accidentally introduced to Gatun Lake around 1967 by a local businessman, and have since flourished to become the dominant angling game fish in Gatun Lake. Locally called Sargento and believed to be the species Cichla pleiozona, these peacock bass originate from the Amazon, Rio Negro, and Orinoco river basins. Although considered a premier game fish in their natural range, the introduction of the peacock bass to Gatun Lake had devastating effects on the local species. According to a report by the Smithsonian, native fish populations in the lake still have not recovered. Only one quarter the number of native fish species were found in a sampling taken in 2016.
