= Chagres River =

River in Panama

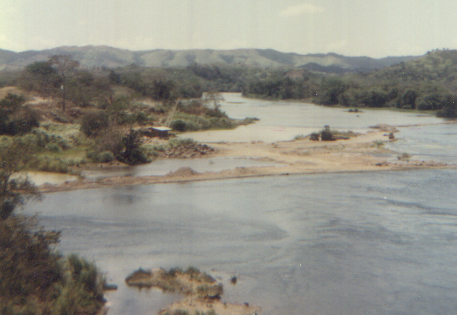
- The Chagres River as seen from the highway between Panama City and Colon in 1986

Physical characteristics
- Source
  - location: Chagres National Park, Panamá Province, Panama
  - coordinates: 9°24′N 79°17′W
- Mouth
  - location: Chagres, Colón Province, Panama
  - coordinates: 9°19′N 80°0′W
  - elevation: 0 m (0 ft)
- Length: 120 mi (190 km), east to west
- Basin size: 1,259.5 sq mi (3,262 km^{2})

The Chagres River (Spanish pronunciation: [ˈtʃaɣɾes]), in central Panama, is the largest river in the Panama Canal's drainage basin. The river is dammed twice, and the resulting reservoirs—Gatun Lake and Lake Alajuela—form an integral part of the canal and its water system. Although the river's natural course runs northwest to its mouth at the Caribbean Sea, its waters also flow, via the canal's locks, into the Gulf of Panama to the south. The Chagres thus has the unusual claim of drainage into two oceans.

== Upper Chagres River to Madden Dam ==
The upper Chagres River, its drainage basin, and the drainage basin of several tributaries lie within the Chagres National Park, created in 1985 to preserve the habitat and flow of water into the canal. The terrain of the upper Chagres drainage basin is rugged, with its mountain slopes exceeding 45 degrees in 90 percent of its territory. Some 98 percent of the park consists of old-growth tropical forest.

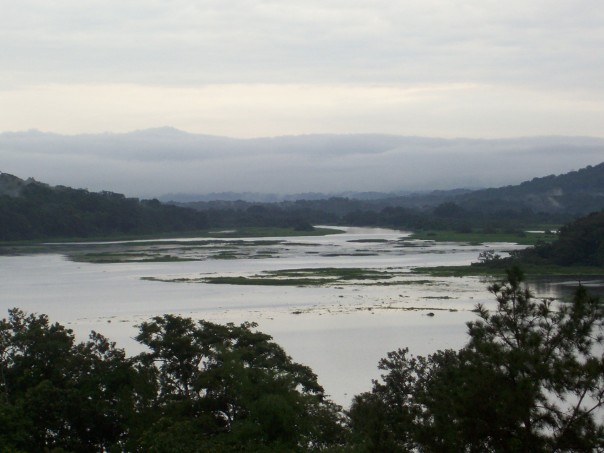
The Chagres River as seen from the Rainforest Resort in Gamboa, Panama

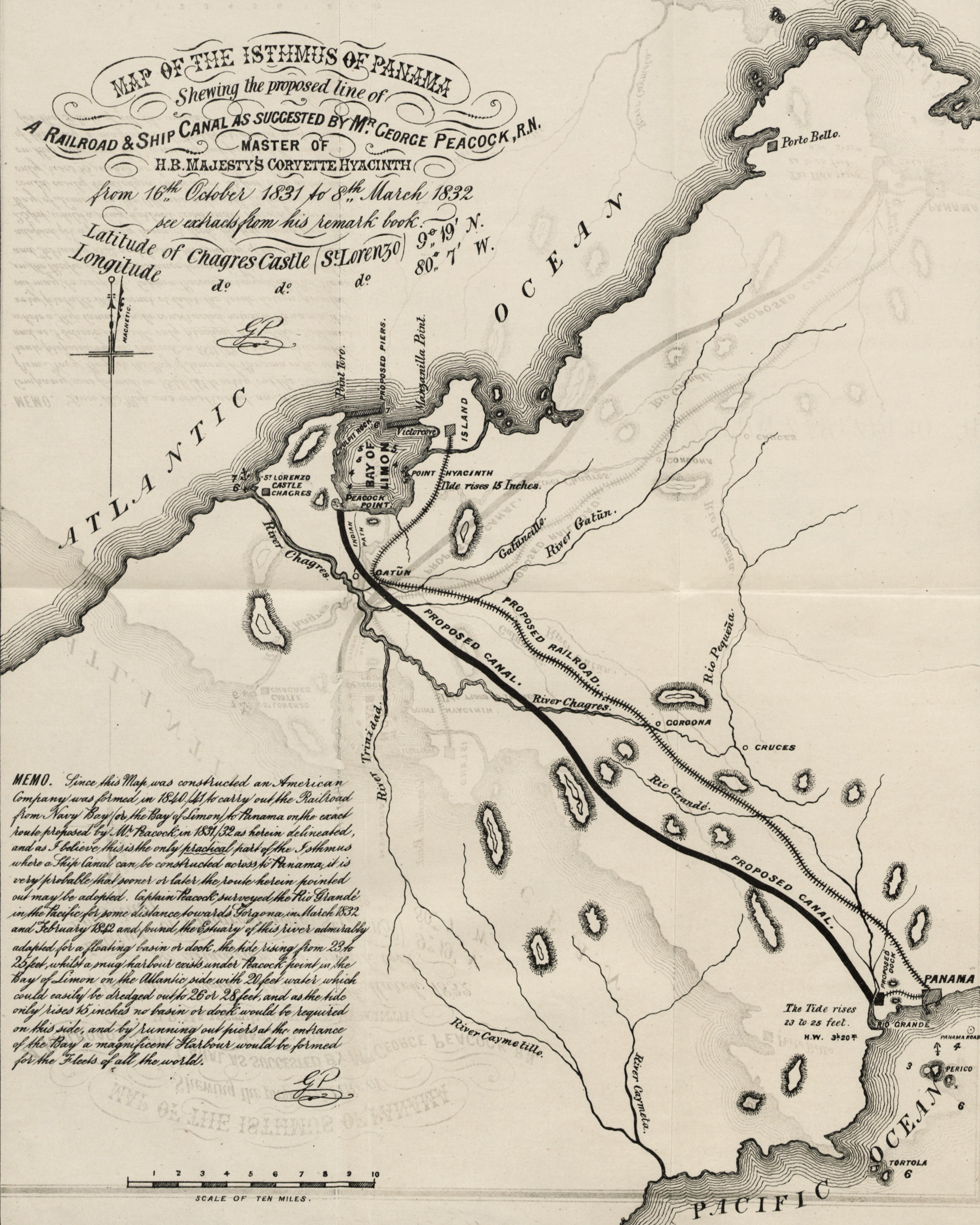
Original course of the Chagres River before construction of the canal.

The upper Chagres and its seven tributaries flow into Lake Alajuela (formerly Madden Lake), the reservoir created by the Madden Dam. As these rivers contribute 45 percent of the total water for the canal, the lake is an essential part of the drainage basin of the canal zone. The lake has a maximum level of 76 metres (250 ft) above sea level, and can store one third of the canal's annual water requirements for the operation of the locks. Lake Alajuela is not part of the navigational route, so there are fewer restrictions on its water level than for Gatun Lake. Water from the reservoir is also used to generate hydroelectric power and to supply Panama City's fresh water.

== Gatun Dam and Gatun Lake ==
At 3.2 kilometres (2.0 mi) from the river's mouth lies the Gatun Dam, which created Gatun Lake and provides hydroelectricity. Created in 1913 by the damming of the Chagres River, Gatun Lake is an essential part of the Panama Canal, which forms a water passage between the Atlantic Ocean and the Pacific Ocean, permitting ship transit in both directions. The lake is essential to the canal's water supply, as it provides the millions of gallons of water at the high level needed for the locks to function correctly. The lake is also part of the navigational canal and provides drinking water for Panama City and Colon.

At the time it was formed, Gatun Lake was the largest man-made lake in the world. The impassable rainforest around Gatun Lake has been the best defense of the Panama Canal. Today, these areas have endured practically unscathed by human interference and are among the one the few accessible areas where various native Central American animal and plant species can be observed undisturbed in their natural habitat. Barro Colorado Island, which was reserved for scientific study when the lake was formed and is today operated by the Smithsonian Institution, is the largest island on Gatun Lake and renowned internationally. Many of the most important groundbreaking scientific and biological discoveries of the tropical animal and plant kingdom took place here. Gatun Lake encompasses approximately 470 square kilometres (180 sq mi), a vast tropical ecological zone part of the Atlantic Forest Corridor. Eco-tourism on Gatun Lake has become a valuable industry for Panamanians.

Angling is one of the primary recreational pursuits on Gatun Lake. It is believed that the Cichla pleiozona species of peacock bass was introduced by accident to Gatun Lake by a Panamanian aquarist and doctor in 1958. Locally called Sargento, these bass are not a native game fish of Panama but originate from the Amazon, Rio Negro, and Orinoco River basins of South America, where they are called Tucanare or Pavon and are considered a premier game fish. Since 1958, the Cichla pleiozona species has flourished and become the dominant game fish in Gatun Lake. It hits topwater lures, subsurface lures imitating bait fish, and a variety of fly patterns, and when hooked they fight energetically. They are unusual for preferring to feed during daylight hours.

== History ==
The Spanish commander Diego Cueto and his helmsman, Pedro de Umbria, visited the region in 1506. The Chagres River was explored in 1527 by Hernando de la Serna, who founded the town of Chagres at its mouth and built the fortress of San Lorenzo. Goods were transported on foot from Panama City to the town of Cruces on the rio Chagres, and from there by sailboats on the river all the way to its mouth. This path, called Camino de Cruces, was very popular until the 18th century.

The privateer Henry Morgan travelled the Chagres River to attack Panama City in 1670–71.

A string of towns developed along the river since the times of Spanish presence in the isthmus, all of which grew in importance during the mid-19th century when the river became an important route of transportation for travelers that cruised its waters as a shortcut to reach the West coast of the USA during the California gold rush. In the later part of the century, the French would use the towns and the river to guide the planning and the construction of the Panama Canal. Later, in the early 1900s, all the existing towns along the river were dismantled during the USA's final stage of the canal's construction. The USA erased a rich history from the area's geography alongside the river, as explored in the book: "Erased: The Untold Story of the Panama Canal" by scholar Marixa Lasso.

The Chagres River is currently the Panama Canal's chief source of water and the river's upper basin is covered by dense tropical forests. To protect that ecosystem, Panama created Chagres National Park in 1985.

In June 2020, a bulk carrier named "Bluebill" struck a railway bridge crossing the Chagres River, near Gamboa, severely damaging the bridge and severing the rail route about midway between the Pacific and Atlantic terminals.
