= Gatun Dam =

Component of the Panama Canal

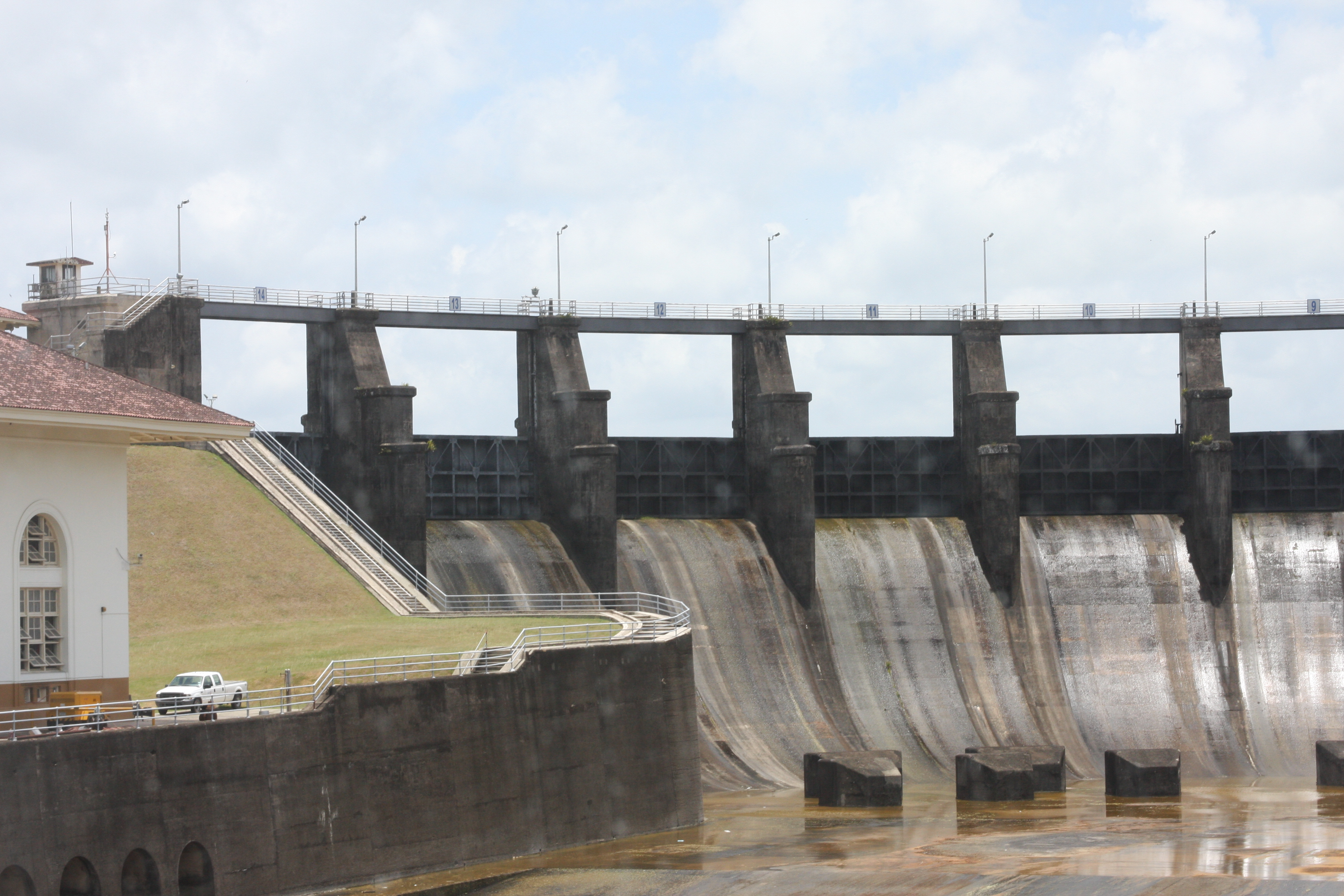
- Interactive map of Gatun Dam
- Country: Panama
- Purpose: Multi-purpose
- Status: Operational
- Construction began: 1907
- Opening date: 1913

Dam and spillways
- Type of dam: Earth fill dam
- Impounds: Chagres River
- Height (foundation): 32 metres (105 ft)
- Length: 2,300 metres (7,500 ft)
- Elevation at crest: 35 metres (115 ft)
- Width (crest): 121 metres (397 ft)
- Width (base): 640 metres (2,100 ft)
- Dam volume: 21,000,000 cubic metres (740,000,000 cu ft)
- Spillways: 14
- Spillway type: Mitre gate
- Spillway length: 246 metres (807 ft)
- S pillway volumetric flow rate: 4,880 cubic metres per second (172,000 cu ft/s)
- Spillway type: Lock culverts
- Spillway volumetric flow rate: 1,400 cubic metres per second (49,000 cu ft/s)

Reservoir
- Creates: Gatun Lake
- Total capacity: 5.2 cubic kilometres (4,200,000 acre⋅ft)
- Catchment area: 2,313 square kilometres (893 sq mi)
- Surface area: 425 square kilometres (164 sq mi)
- Normal elevation: 26 metres (85 ft)

Gatun Hydroelectric Power Plant
- Coordinates: 9.26391°N 79.93088°W
- Type: Conventional
- Turbines: 3
- Installed capacity: 6 megawatts (8,000 hp)

The Gatun Dam is an earthen dam across the Chagres River in Panama, near the town of Gatún. The dam, constructed between 1907 and 1913, is a crucial element of the Panama Canal; it impounds the artificial Gatun Lake, which carries ships 33 kilometres (21 mi) of their transit across the Isthmus of Panama. In addition, a hydro-electric generating station at the dam generates electricity which is used to operate the locks and other equipment in the canal.

Construction of the dam was a great engineering achievement, eclipsed only by the parallel excavation of the Culebra Cut; at the time of completion, the dam was the largest earth dam in the world, and Gatun Lake was the largest artificial lake in the world.

== Description ==
The dam is situated in the valley of the Chagres River, about 10 kilometres (6.2 mi) from its mouth in the Caribbean Sea. The hills bordering the valley of the Chagres form a gap just over 2 kilometres (1.2 mi) wide at this point, with a natural rocky hill in the centre of the gap. The gap is filled by an earth dam, 640 metres (2,100 ft) thick at the base, 2,300 metres (7,500 ft) long along the top, 121-metre (397 ft) thick at the water level, and 30-metre (98 ft) thick at the top, which is 9 metres (30 ft) above the normal lake level.

The spillway for the dam is constructed on the central hill; it consists of a semi-circular concrete dam, which regulates the flow of water down a concrete channel built into the back slope of the hill. The spillway dam itself measures 225 metres (738 ft) along the top; its crest is at 16 feet (4.9 m) below the normal lake level. The spillway is designed so that water pouring over the semi-circular dam converges at the bottom from opposite directions and neutralises its own force, thus minimising erosion below.

The spillway dam is topped by 14 gates, supported by concrete piers and each 14 metres (46 ft) wide by 6 metres (20 ft) high. These gates, which are electrically operated, are raised or lowered to control the flow of water; with the lake level at 26.5 metres (87 ft), its planned maximum level, the capacity of the spillway is 4,100 cubic metres (140,000 ft^{3}) per second, more than the maximum flow of the Chagres River. In addition to this, the culverts in the locks can dispose of 1,400 cubic metres (49,000 cu ft) per second.

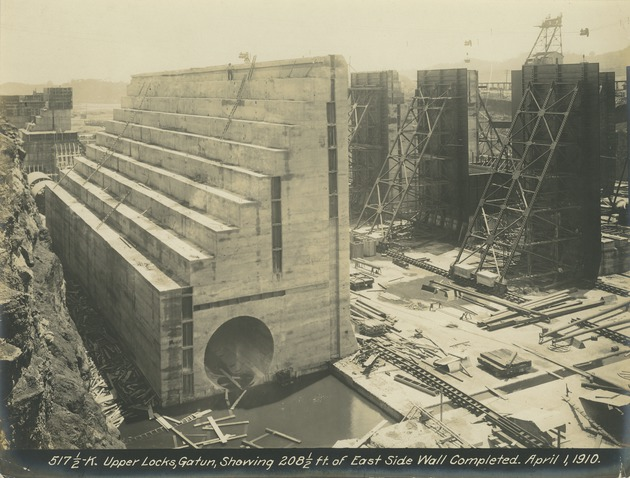
Gatun Upper Locks Completed, April 1, 1910.

Gatun Lake has an area of 425 square kilometres (164 sq mi) at its normal level; it stores 5.2 cubic kilometres (4,200,000 acre⋅ft) of water, which is about as much as the Chagres River brings down in an average year.

== Power generation ==
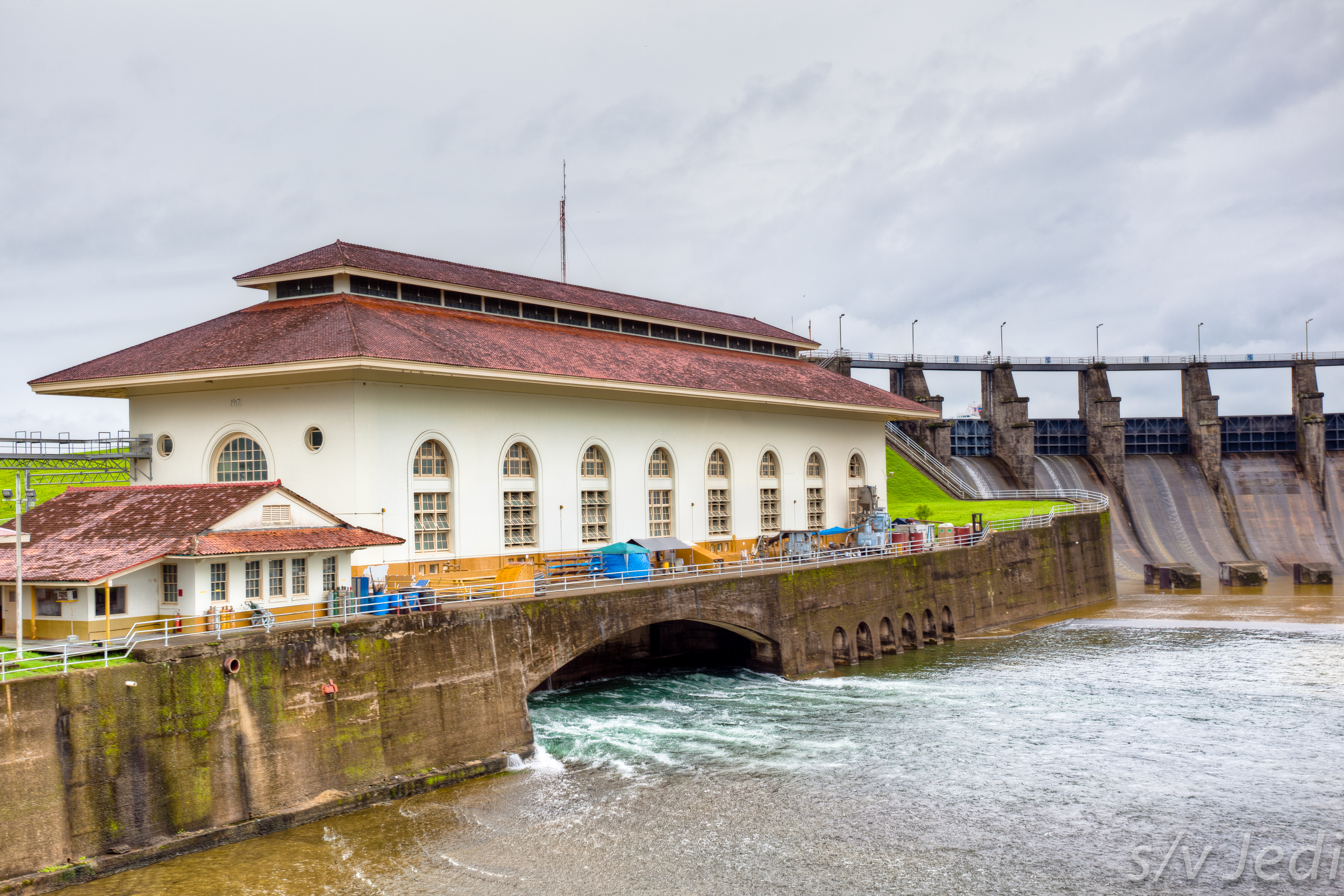
Gatun dam power generating station

The dam incorporates a hydro-electric generating station, which is situated on the east side of the spillway discharge channel. This uses water from the lake to drive a number of turbine-generators; as first commissioned, three generators were installed, producing a total of 6 megawatts (8,000 hp) of electricity. The power generated is used for the operation of the lock and spillway machinery, and for the lighting of the locks and the canal villages.

== Construction ==
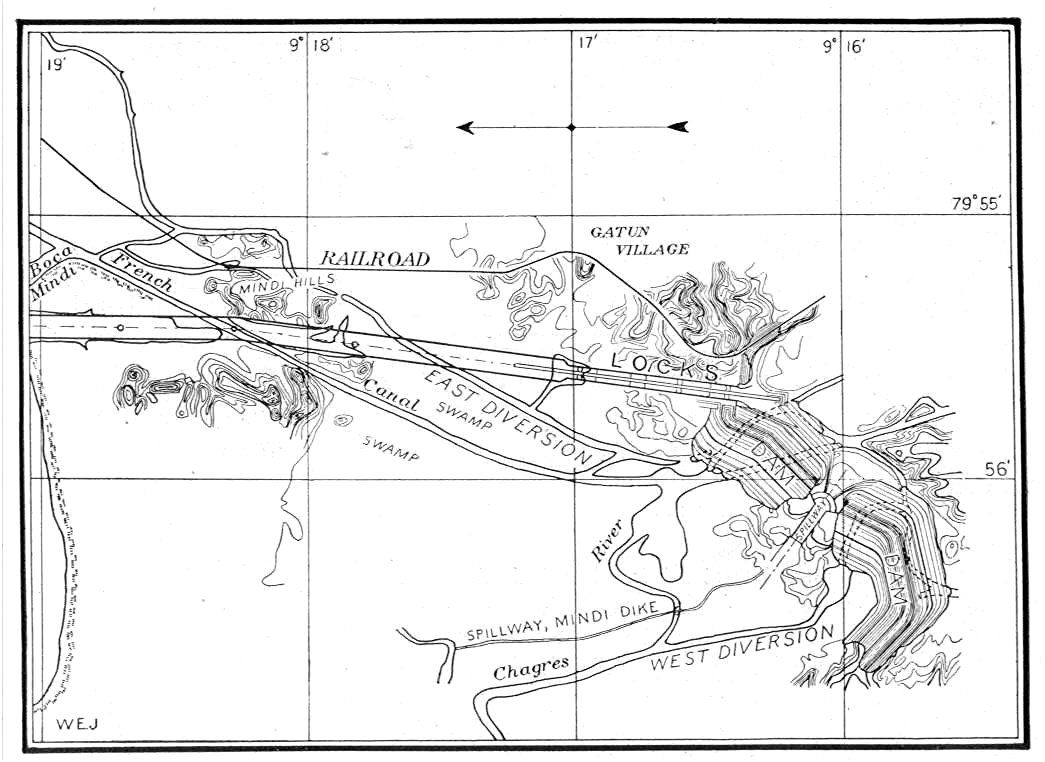
This map from the construction era illustrates the area around the dam and locks, which are shown superposed over the previous French excavations.

The canal effort was begun by a French company (La Compagnie Universelle du Canal Interocéanique) in 1880 to 1889. With poor exploration of the options and with poor information of the costs, the French company planned to construct a sea-level canal linking the two coasts. They initially thought they could do this for about $120 million. After spending about one billion Francs (about $300,000,000), losing about 22,000 workers and going bankrupt, the French effort essentially ceased. A sea level canal would not have required the dam to be built but would have still required extensive provisions made to accommodate the ever-changing Chagres River flow. The United States took over the 10 miles (16 km) wide Canal Zone and resumed building the canal on 4 May 1904. Almost two years were spent in infra-structure preparation, mosquito abatement (the newly discovered vector spreading Yellow fever and Malaria), Panama Railroad improvements, and planning before the work got up to full speed. After reviewing the options and costs, in 1906 a lock-based canal was decided upon and agreed to by President Theodore Roosevelt.

Even before the lock canal decision was made, Major George Washington Goethals (United States Army Corps of Engineers), the chief engineer from 1907 to 1914 of the construction effort, had already carried out an investigation under John Frank Stevens (chief engineer, 1905–1907) into determining the suitability of the land at Gatún for the building of a large dam there. Extensive test borings were made to determine the suitability of the land, and pressure tests were carried out on the material to be used in construction to determine its durability.

The Gatun Dam serves two important purposes: it controls the ever varying Chagres River and creates Gatun Lake. The lake at about 85 feet (26 m) elevation provides an elevated path for ships across most of the Isthmus of Panama including through the treacherous V-shaped Culebra Cut (Gaillard Cut). This saved excavating literally millions of cubic yards of material that would have been necessary for a sea-level canal. The lake height is regulated by spillways that control the water flow out of the dam to obtain an almost constant height in wet or dry seasons. The lake also acts as a massive reservoir to work the locks on both the Pacific Ocean and Atlantic Ocean ends of the canal and provides via hydro-electric generators about 6 MW of electrical power needed to run the locks and dam. After finishing the dam and filling Gatun Lake it was dredged where necessary to obtain a clear ship channel across the lake.

The Gatún location was in most ways ideal for a dam; upstream of the dam site the hills enclosing the Chagres River opened very wide around the area that is now Gatun Lake. Over a narrow gap the hills close to a relatively narrow gap with a natural rock-based channel in the centre. This allows a moderately sized dam to enclose a huge body of water, which both provides passage for ships across much of the isthmus, and provides a reservoir of water with which to operate the locks. The central hill was the ideal solid base for the construction of the concrete spillway and its dam, the main part of the dam being earth. The only problem was the huge scale of the dam required massive rock and dirt fill that was provided by about 100 trainloads of waste rock deposited into two parallel walls of waste rock about 2,700 feet (820 m) apart every day for several years from the Gaillard Cut (now called the Culebra Cut) and the Gatun Locks excavation. Between these waste rock walls an impervious core was created by using a hydraulic fill technique which pumped millions of cubic yards of clay material and water into the area between the rock walls. This fill was made by digging up the soft clay present in the valley below, where dredges excavated the clay and water and loaded it into pumps that delivered it up into a pond created between the inner and outer walls of the dam. The pumped mixture was allowed to sit until the clay settled out, with the excess water being drawn off and pumped back downstream. This dried and hardened material created a solid core of "natural" cement at the core of the dam.

After the dam was built to its desired height, the entire up-stream side was armored to prevent wave action damaging the dam by placing large boulders on the face, particularly where there is strong wave action.

The dam contains some 17,000,000 cubic metres (600,000,000 cu ft) of material and is about 2,700 feet (820 m) wide at its base, about 105 feet (32 m) high and 7,500 feet (2,300 m) long. The dam weighs some 27,000,000 long tons (30,000,000 short tons). It covers 1.17 square kilometres (290 acres) of ground, and contains enough earth and rock to build a wall 1 1/2 metres high and 29 cm thick (or four foot eight inches high and a foot thick) around the Earth at the equator.

== Water level ==
After the opening of the Panama Canal, it was found that the water level impounded by the dam did not stay constant enough during the dry season for the operation of the canal. The Madden Dam was constructed much higher up the Chagres River to provide a reservoir and hydroelectric power for Panama City, opening in 1935.

== See also ==
- List of power stations in Panama
