= Zonians =

Person from the Panama Canal Zone

Zoneítas
- Flag of the Panama Canal Zone

Regions with significant populations
- Panama (Panamá, Colón), United States

Languages
- English, Spanish

Religion
- Protestantism, Roman Catholicism, Judaism

Related ethnic groups
- Americans, Panamanians

Zonians (Spanish: Zoneítas, singular: zoneíta, zoniano) are people associated with the Panama Canal Zone 1979 and 1999 while it was a concession of the United States. Most were American expatriates loyal to the United States. They helped build and maintain the canal. Many Zonians are descendants of the civilian American workers who came to the area during the early 1900s to work and maintain the canal. Many of the Zonians were American citizens born in the Canal Zone or had spent their childhood there. A significant presence of American canal workers remained in the Canal region until its turnover in 1999.

== National identity ==
Some Zonians consider themselves to be Panamanian and U.S. citizens, although quite a few say that they are only American or only Panamanian. This unique relation—physically near Panama yet citizens of the U.S.—makes Zonians a diasporic community, with members turning to online forums (such as the PANAMA-L listserv) to discuss and debate issues such as nationalism, belonging, and national identity.

The Panama Canal Society holds a reunion for Zonians every year, usually in Orlando, Florida.

== Notable Zonians ==
- John McCain, United States senator and presidential nominee
- Rod Carew, professional baseball player
- John G. Claybourn, civil engineer, designer of Gamboa, Panama
- Karen Hughes, United States under secretary of state
- Frederick W. Leslie, American astronaut
- Gustavo A. Mellander, higher education administrator
- Richard Prince, painter and photographer
- Charles S. Spencer, curator
- Stephen Stills, noted rock musician
- Lou Sola, Federal Maritime commissioner.
- Frederik Pohl, science fiction writer and editor
- Sage Steele, sports announcer
- Edward A. Murphy, Jr., aerospace engineer and Murphy's law originator
- Leo Barker, professional American football player
- Ernest Hallen, photographer
- Shoshana Johnson, American prisoner of war in Iraq
- Alexis Texas, adult film star
