= John G. Claybourn =

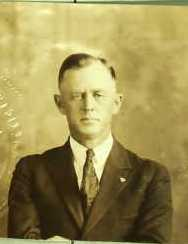
- Born: May 23, 1886; Albert Lea, Minnesota, U.S.
- Died: June 26, 1967
- Education: University of Minnesota
- Occupation: Canal engineer
- Parent(s): John Bethel Claybourn (1846–1923); Mary Ellen Claybourn (1848–1940)

John Geronald Claybourn (May 23, 1886 – June 26, 1967) was a civil engineer and Dredging Division Superintendent of the Isthmian Canal Commission. He was the original designer of Gamboa, Panama. During his career on the Panama Canal and after his retirement, Claybourn was involved as a consultant in river and harbor improvement projects in several countries, primarily in Latin America.

== Early life, education, and family ==
John Claybourn was born on May 23, 1886, in Albert Lea, Minnesota, to John B. and Ellen Claybourn. His uncle Ephraim Claybourn and cousin Vern Claybourn both held positions of prominence with the canal, making work there a family business of sorts. John graduated from high school in Albert Lea and then attended the College of Engineering at the University of Minnesota for three years. Claybourn was married to Regina Flores, a native of Colombia, from 1913 until about 1927. In 1928 he then married Elsie Kathryn Grieser, a stenographer on the canal who had attained a measure of celebrity in her youth as a long-distance swimmer and canoeist.

== Panama Canal ==
Claybourn began working with the dredging division of the Panama Canal in 1914. He was then promoted to junior engineer (1917-1918), assistant engineer (1919-1920), and finally superintendent of the division (1921-1948). In the 1930s he developed a plan to add a third set of locks, along with a 1940s plan to replace the canal with a parallel sea-level canal.

== Gamboa ==
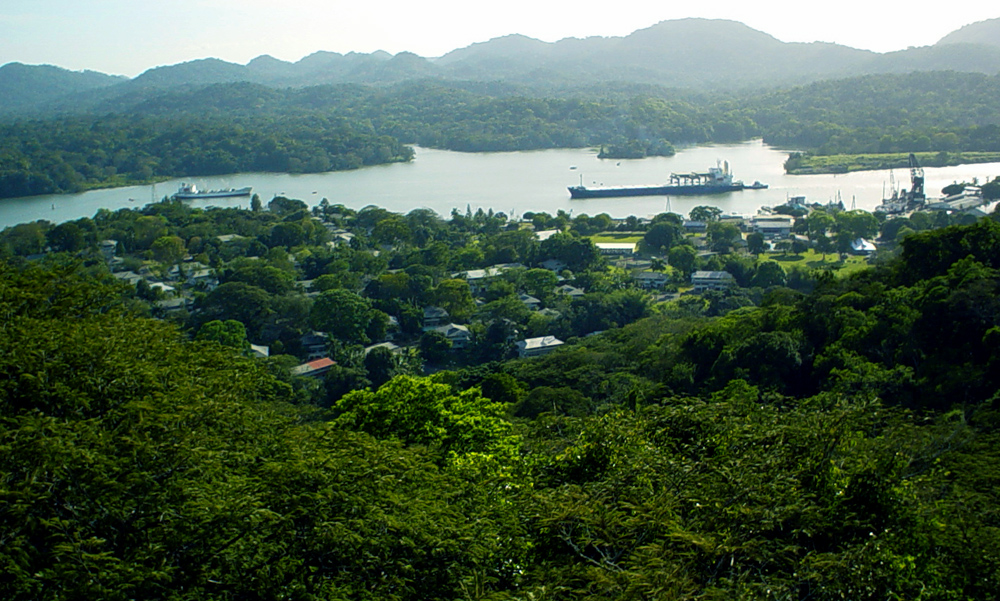
Gamboa and the Panama Canal as seen from the Gamboa Rainforest Resort's Canopy Tower

On July 30, 1923, two years after taking the role of superintendent of the Dredging Division, Claybourn wrote a memo to Jay Johnson Morrow, Governor of the Panama Canal Zone, recommending that the Dredging Division shops be moved from Paraiso to Gamboa for two reasons: "First, as a safeguard in case of obstruction of the Cut by slides, the logical location being between any possible dredging and the dumps at Gatun Lake; second, increased Canal traffic, as well as the size of ships, introduces a serious menace to our fleet when moored in the comparatively narrow confines of the Cut at Paraiso." Three months later his concerns were validated when the USS O-5 (SS-66) entered Limon Bay, preparatory to transiting the Panama Canal, and was rammed by the United Fruit Company steamer Abangarez and sank in less than a minute. Three men died; 16 others escaped.

In 1924, Claybourn created the original design and layout for a new town in Gamboa, Panama, including new facilities to house the canal's dredging division. After twelve years of lobbying Panama Canal governors to move the division from Paraíso, Panamá Province to Gamboa, Claybourn's suggestion was finally accepted by the Panama Canal Company in 1934. It moved its Dredging Division from the town of Paraíso to Gamboa in 1936.

Claybourn served as President of the Gamboa Civic Council from 1937 to 1948 and President of the Gamboa Golf and Country Club in 1937, which is now the site of the Gamboa Rainforest Resort. According to his successor, "He was known as John 'God' Claybourn by his employees. In designing the layout of the town he made it so that he could ravel[sic] from his residence to his headquarters without STOP signs. He played a key role in the design and materials selection for the residences." In 1933, when a three-man board appointed by Canal Zone Governor J.L. Schley studied the feasibility of moving the Dredging Division to Gamboa, the population was 251, including just 10 Americans. The first Dredging Division families began moving into the newly built town of Gamboa in September 1936. Within a year, the town's population jumped to 1,419 and by 1942, the town reached its peak population of 3,853. To this day Gamboa remains the primary headquarters of the Dredging Division of the Panama Canal Authority.

== Consulting ==
While working on the canal, Claybourn also worked as a consultant on a variety of river and harbor improvement projects in the surrounding countries, including work on the Dique de Cartagena, a ship canal in Colombia, and projects in Costa Rica, Ecuador, Florida, and Panama. In the 1920s John also worked on the mining of the Panama Gold Dredging Company. In Burma, from 1951 to 1953, he worked to rebuild the transportation network on the Irrawaddy River that was destroyed during World War II, and developed the Dalla Dockyards area near Rangoon. He died on June 26, 1967.

== Bibliography ==
Claybourn's papers are part of a collection at the Bentley Historical Library at the University of Michigan. Throughout his life he also published several books relating to his work, including the following:

- Claybourn, John G., Dredging on the Panama Canal (1931)
- Claybourn, John G., The Dredging Division of the Panama Canal, Its Function, Organization and Equipment (1937)
- Claybourn, John G., Evolution of the Panama Canal (1944)
- Claybourn, John G., Streamlining the Panama Canal for Maximum Safety and Unlimited Capacity (1946)
- Claybourn, John G., Suggested Methods and Equipment, Dredging and Mining for Converting the Present Lock Type Canal to Sea Level (1947)
