= Zonie =

Zonie is a slang term for:

- Zonian, somebody from the former Panama Canal Zone
- Somebody from Arizona
