= Raid at Renacer Prison =

US victory in the 1989 invasion of Panama

The raid of Renacer Prison
- Part of United States invasion of Panama
- Raid at Renacer Prison (Panama)
Date	20 December 1989
Location	Panama
Result	American victory

Belligerents
United States	Panama

Commanders and leaders
(United States) Lt. Col. Lynn Moore	(Panama) Unknown

Units involved
7th Infantry Division; 82nd Airborne Division: 504th Parachute Infantry Regiment; 3rd Battalion; Company C; 228th Aviation Regiment: 1st Battalion; 307th Engineer Battalion; 1097th Transportation Company	Panama Defense Forces

Strength
83 paratroopers 3 helicopters 2 scout helicopters 1 attack helicopter 1 LCM	27

Casualties and losses
4 wounded	5 killed 6 wounded 22 captured 64 hostages freed

The Raid at Renacer Prison was an attack on the El Renacer prison in Gamboa, Panama, by units of the 82nd Airborne Division of the U.S. Army on 20 December 1989, during the United States invasion of Panama. During the raid the U.S. military freed the sixty-four prisoners held in the detention facility and killed five soldiers of the Panama Defense Forces.

== See also ==
- Operation Acid Gambit
