= Eldon Bargewell =

United States Army general (1947–2019)

Eldon A. Bargewell
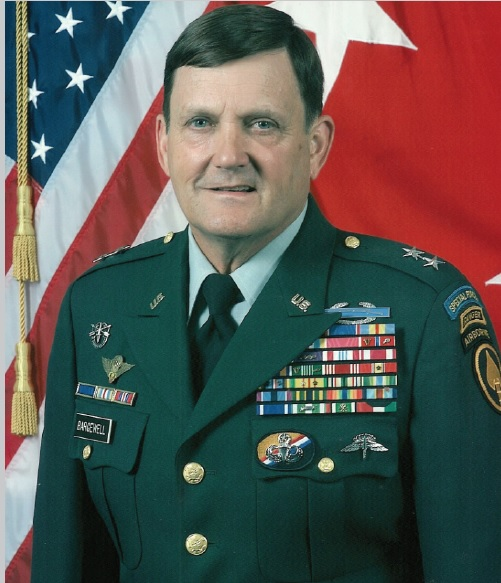
- Born: August 13, 1947; Hoquiam, Washington, U.S.
- Died: April 29, 2019 (aged 71); Eufaula, Alabama, U.S.
- Military career
- Allegiance: United States
- Branch: United States Army
- Service years: 1967–2006
- Rank: Major General
- Units: 2nd Ranger Battalion; 5th Special Forces Group; MACV-SOG; Delta Force
- Commands: Special Operations Command Europe; Delta Force; Joint Special Operations Command; 5th Special Forces Group; Military Assistance Command, Vietnam – Studies and Observations Group
- Conflicts: Vietnam War; Operation Just Cause; Operation Acid Gambit; War in Afghanistan
- Awards: Distinguished Service Cross; Defense Distinguished Service Medal; Army Distinguished Service Medal; Defense Superior Service Medal (2); Legion of Merit; Bronze Star Medal (6); Purple Heart (4)

Major General Eldon Arthur Bargewell (August 13, 1947 – April 29, 2019) was a United States Army officer. He served as commander of the U.S. Army's Delta Force unit.

== Early life and education ==
Bargewell was born in Hoquiam, Washington and graduated from Hoquiam High School in 1965, enlisting in the United States Army in 1967.

== Military career ==
Bargewell enlisted in the United States Army in 1967 and completed the Special Forces Qualification Course in December 1967. Bargewell was assigned to 6th and 7th Special Forces Groups before receiving assignment to South Vietnam. During the Vietnam War Bargewell was accepted into MACV-SOG where he served at the "Command And Control North (CCN)" Forward Operating Base 4 at Da Nang and served as Non-Commissioned Officer Team Leader for Reconnaissance Team "Viper" (all CCN teams were named for states or snakes) completing missions in Laos. While serving with CCN, Bargewell earned the Distinguished Service Cross in September 1971 for his actions in combat in saving his team and getting them to safety. Bargewell later received assignment to 10th Special Forces Group at Fort Devens, Massachusetts.

Bargewell graduated from Officer candidate School and received his commission in 1973. In addition, he completed a Bachelor of Science degree in resource management at Troy State University.

Bargewell's first assignment was as a member of the 2nd Battalion 75th Ranger Regiment at Fort Lewis, Washington, where he later served as rifle platoon leader and executive officer. As a captain, Bargewell was assigned as S3 and Rifle Company Commander with 2nd Battalion, 47th Infantry Regiment. In 1981 Bargewell volunteered for and completed a specialized selection and operator training course for assignment to Delta Force where he would serve as Squadron Executive Officer, Troop commander, Unit Operations Officer, Squadron Commander (twice), Deputy Commander and Unit Commander from July 1996 to July 1998.

While in Delta Force Bargewell participated in Operation Acid Gambit during the invasion of Panama, including the daring rescue of American citizen Kurt Muse from the Modelo prison. After the successful extraction of the hostage the MH-6 Little Bird transporting Muse as well as several Operators crashed behind enemy lines wounding many of them; however, they managed to seek cover in the city until they were recovered by an APC.

He commanded a Delta Force Squadron (A Squadron) during Operation Desert Storm in western Iraq. In 1998 Bargewell became Commanding General of Special Operations Command Europe, followed by assistant chief of staff for SFOR military operations in Sarajevo. Bargewell returned to the continental United States, and served as director of the center of operations, plans, and policies of United States Special Operations Command. In 2005, Bargewell became Director of Strategic Operations at Multinational Force Iraq. While serving as the Operations Officer, Bargewell pursued an outside administrative investigation as to how knowledge of the Haditha incident in Iraq passed up the Marine chain of command and whether or not any commanders lied in their reports. The informal investigation, pursuant to Army regulation AR 15-6, began on March 19, 2006, and was expected to examine how servicemembers and their commanders were trained in the rules of engagement. The completed report was sent to Army Lt. Gen. Peter W. Chiarelli, the second-ranked US commander in Iraq, on the morning of June 15, 2006. This was separate from a criminal investigation being conducted by the Naval Criminal Investigative Service.

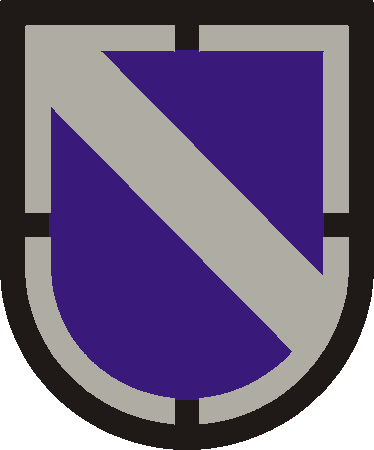
Beret flash of SOCEUR for U.S. Army.

=== Distinguished Service Cross ===
Eldon A. Bargewell
General Orders: Headquarters, U.S. Army, Vietnam, General Orders No. 3391 (November 30, 1971)
Action Date: 27-Sep-71
Service: United States Army
Rank: Staff Sergeant
Company: Command and Control (North), TF 1, SOG
Regiment: 5th Special Forces Group (Airborne)
Division: 1st Special Forces Command (Airborne)

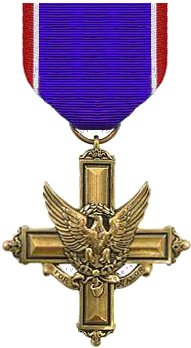

Citation:

The President of the United States of America, authorized by Act of Congress, July 9, 1918 (amended by act of July 25, 1963), takes pleasure in presenting the Distinguished Service Cross to Staff Sergeant Eldon A. Bargewell, United States Army, for extraordinary heroism in connection with military operations involving conflict with an armed hostile force in the Republic of Vietnam, while serving with Command and Control (North), Task Force 1, Studies and Observations Group, 5th Special Forces Group (Airborne), 1st Special Forces, attached to U.S. Army Vietnam Training Advisory Group (TF1AE), U.S. Army Vietnam Training Support Headquarters. Staff Sergeant Bargewell distinguished himself on 27 September 1971 while serving as a member of a long range reconnaissance team operating deep in enemy territory. On that date, his team came under attack by an estimated 75 to 100 man enemy force. Staff Sergeant Bargewell suffered multiple fragmentation wounds from an exploding B-40 rocket in the initial assault, but despite the serious wounds, placed a deadly volume of machine gun fire on the enemy line. As the enemy advanced, he succeeded in breaking the assault and forced them to withdraw with numerous casualties. When the enemy regrouped, they resumed their assault on the beleaguered team, placing a heavy volume of small arms and automatic weapons fire on Staff Sergeant Bargewell's sector of the defensive perimeter. Again he exposed himself to the enemy fire in order to hold his position and prevent the enemy from overrunning the small team. After breaking the enemy assault, the team withdrew to a nearby guard. At the landing zone, Staff sergeant Bargewell refused medical treatment in order to defend a sector of the perimeter, and insured the safe extraction of his team. Staff Sergeant Bargewell's extraordinary heroism and devotion to duty were in keeping with the highest traditions of the military service and reflect great credit upon himself, his unit, and the United States Army.

== Death ==
Bargewell died near his home at the age of 71 when his lawnmower went over an embankment.

== Awards and decorations ==
Combat Infantryman Badge
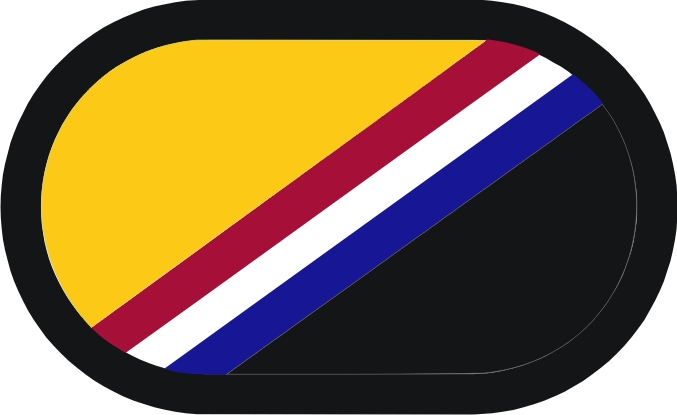
Master Parachutist Badge with USSOCOM background trimming
Military Free Fall Parachutist Badge
Special Forces Tab
Ranger tab
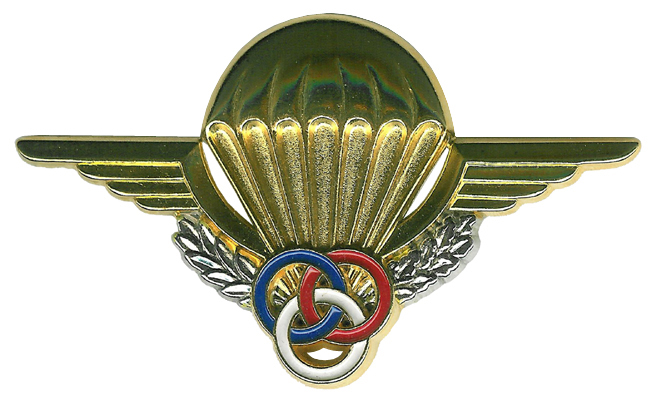
French Parachutist Instructor Badge
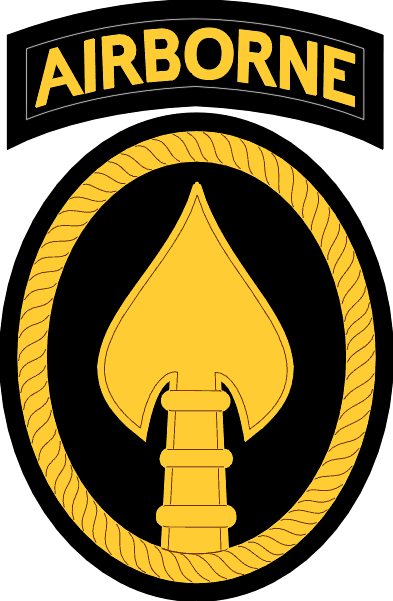
United States Special Operations Command Shoulder Sleeve Insignia
Army Special Forces Command Distinctive Unit Insignia
7 Overseas Service Bars

Distinguished Service Cross
Defense Distinguished Service Medal
Army Distinguished Service Medal
Defense Superior Service Medal with one bronze oak leaf cluster
Legion of Merit
Bronze Star Medal with "V" device and silver oak leaf cluster
Purple Heart with three oak leaf clusters
Defense Meritorious Service Medal
Meritorious Service Medal
Air Medal
Army Commendation Medal with "V" device and oak leaf cluster
Army Presidential Unit Citation
Joint Meritorious Unit Award
Valorous Unit Award
Army Meritorious Unit Commendation
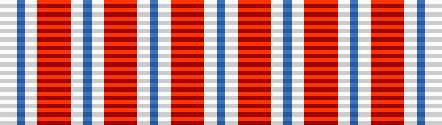
Army Outstanding Civilian Service Award
Army Good Conduct Medal
National Defense Service Medal with two bronze service stars
Armed Forces Expeditionary Medal with Arrowhead device and service star
Vietnam Service Medal with six service stars
Southwest Asia Service Medal
Global War on Terrorism Service Medal
Armed Forces Service Medal
Humanitarian Service Medal
NCO Professional Development Ribbon
Army Service Ribbon
Army Overseas Service Ribbon
NATO Medal for the former Yugoslavia
French commemorative medal
Republic of Vietnam Gallantry Cross Unit Citation
Republic of Vietnam Civil Actions Medal Unit Citation
Vietnam Campaign Medal
Kuwait Liberation Medal (Saudi Arabia)
Kuwait Liberation Medal (Kuwait)

Bargewell was inducted into the U.S. Army Ranger Hall of Fame in 2011.
