= Seal and flag of the Panama Canal Zone =

Seal of the Panama Canal Zone
- Armiger: Panama Canal Zone
- Adopted: 1906
- Motto: The Land Divided; The World United

Panama Canal Zone
- Adopted: 1915
- Design: The territory seal on a blue background

The seal and flag were the symbols of the Panama Canal Zone, a concession of the United States in Panama, that existed from 1903 to 1979. The seal was adopted in 1906, and the flag in 1915. They were used until October 1, 1979, when the territory ceased to exist.

== Design ==
=== Seal ===
The 1906 design of the seal had central image of a shield containing a brown galleon ship with white sails, passing through the Panama Canal, placed in the lower part of the shield. The ship flew an orange-and-white flag on the top of its sail. On the sides of the ship were located brown banks of the Canal, with green grass. The ship sailed in the blue water, with waves, with a yellow reflection of the orange sky, that made for the background. The top portion of the shield consisted of 2 rows of horizontal stripes. The top stripe was blue, while the bottom one was divided into 13 vertical stripes, that alternated between white and red. The colours referenced the flag of the United States. Below the shield was located a light blue ribbon with motto "The Land Divided; The World United" spelled in yellow capital letters.

Both elements were placed on the white background within a blue circle with yellow outer and inner boundaries. The top of the circle had the text "Seal of the Canal Zone Isthmus of Panama" written in yellow capital letters. On the bottom of the circle were located three yellow five-pointed stars.

=== Flag ===
The flag consisted of the seal of the territory, placed in the centre, on the blue background.

== History ==
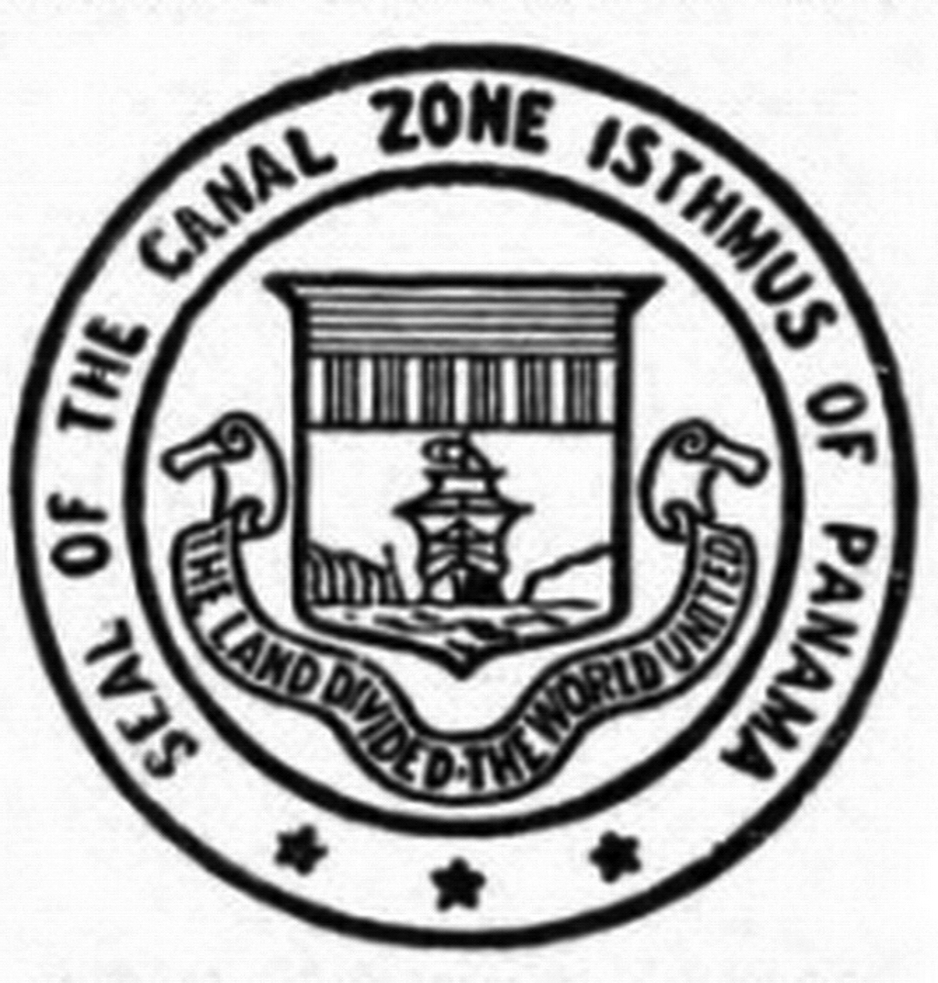
The 1916 depiction of the seal of the Panama Canal Zone.

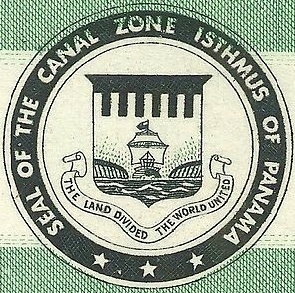
The depiction of the seal from the 1965 postage stamp.

The seal was designed by the governor of the Panama Canal Zone, George Whitefield Davis, and former United States Department of State official, Gaillard Hunt. In 1905, Davis proposed a design of the seal, that included the motives related to the Panama Canal. He described the construction of the canal as an endeavor to "join the seas for the benefit of mankind", which later evolved into the motto of the territory, "the land divided; the world united". In 1905, Tiffany and Company submitted several designs for the seal to the United States Department of State and the Isthmian Canal Commission. Following Hunt's recommendation, the slightly modified version of one of the submitted designs had been adopted the following year.

In 1915, the president of the United States, Woodrow Wilson, issued executive order establishing that the Governor of the Panama Canal should have a distinctive flag, bearing the seal, for use in his official capacity. His executive order gave the first officially published description of the seal: "The seal consists of a shield, showing in base a Spanish galleon of the Fifteenth Century under full sail coming on between two high banks, all purpure, the sky yellow with the glow of sunset; in the chief are the colors of the arms of the United States. Under the shield is the motto: 'The land divided; the world united!'" The seal was further modified in 1956.

The Panama Canal Zone ceased to exist on October 1, 1979. As such, its seal and the flag became obsolete.
