= Operation Acid Gambit =

Military operation during the United States invasion of Panama

- Part of the United States invasion of Panama
- Operation Acid Gambit (Panama)
| Date | 20 December 1989 |
| Location | Panama City, Panama |
| Result | American victory: Prisoner extracted successfully |

Belligerents
| United States | Panama |

Commanders and leaders
| (United States) Col. Peter J. Schoomaker (United States) Eldon Bargewell (United States) Gary L. Harrell | (Panama) Manuel Noriega |

Units involved
| 1st SFOD-D; 160th SOAR(A); 5th Infantry Division | Panama Defense Forces |

Strength
| 23 Delta Operators; 4 MH-6 helicopters | Unknown |

Casualties and losses
| 4 wounded 1 helicopter crashed | 5 killed 1 captured |

Operation Acid Gambit took place as an opening action of the United States invasion of Panama, on 20 December 1989. It was a U.S. Delta Force operation that retrieved Kurt Muse, a rumored asset of the Central Intelligence Agency, operating in Panama who had been arrested for leading a plot with other Panamanians to overthrow the government of Panama, from the Cárcel Modelo, a notorious prison in Panama City.

== Background ==
Muse had been arrested in 1989 for setting up covert anti-Noriega radio transmissions in Panama. The raid, conducted by 23 Delta Force operators and supported by the Night Stalkers, was delayed until the United States invaded Panama to arrest Noriega, in Operation Just Cause on 20 December 1989. Muse was later reported to be a CIA operative by The Washington Post.

The last contact Muse had with an American official before the raid was with an unidentified American colonel. It took place in the prison's public visiting areas. During the visit an American helicopter buzzed at a low altitude and high speed above the prison. When the sound subsided, the colonel addressed Muse loud enough for the entire room to hear. He stated that there was an order to kill Muse if the United States were to become involved in a conflict with Panama, which essentially meant Muse was not a prisoner but a hostage. The colonel threatened that if anyone harmed him, everyone in the prison would be killed.

== The operation ==
Leading the operation were Lieutenant Colonel Eldon Bargewell and Major Gary L. Harrell. The Delta operators were inserted onto the roof of the prison by MH-6 Little Bird helicopters. One operator was tasked to abseil down to the side of the building, hang outside Muse's cell window, and eliminate the guard charged with killing Muse if a rescue was mounted. However, the guard was not there.

After breaching the rooftop door, the Delta operators descended the two flights of stairs towards Muse's cell. A Delta operator killed the guard who was responsible for killing Muse in case of a rescue. The lock on the door of Muse's cell was shot twice; however, it did not break, and a small explosive was used to gain access to his cell. Delta operators gave Muse body armor, a ballistic helmet, and goggles and moved him to the roof, where they would be exfiltrated by MH-6 Little Birds back to the US base.

During extraction from the prison, the Hughes MH-6 Little Bird helicopter transporting Muse crashed. Delta Force operators Pat Savidge, Tom Caldwell, James Sudderth, and Kelly Venden were wounded in the crash. Everyone aboard the helicopter took cover in a nearby building. The Delta operators managed to signal one of the gunships flying over the area with an infrared strobe light. Shortly afterwards, an M113 armored personnel carrier from the 5th Infantry Division extracted Muse and the retrieval team.

== Legacy ==
Several years after the rescue, Muse collaborated with author John Gilstrap on a book about the incident, Six Minutes to Freedom.

== See also ==
- List of special forces units
- List of operations conducted by Delta Force
- List of Delta Force members
- Raid at Renacer Prison
