= Paraíso, Panamá Province =

Coordinates: 9°2′0″N 79°37′30″W

Paraiso, CZ in 1955

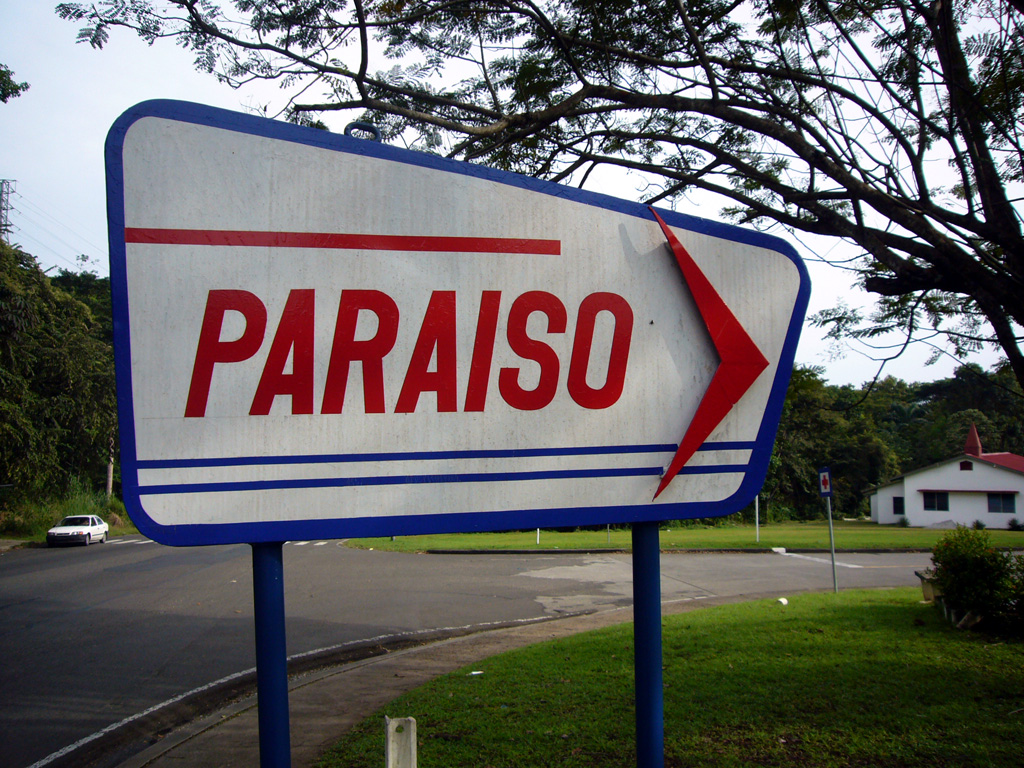
CZ-style sign for Paraiso, Gaillard Highway (2007)

Paraíso is a town in the Republic of Panama, located just north of the Panama Canal's Pedro Miguel Locks. It was a vibrant township of the old Canal Zone, though it was segregated for most of its history.

== Early history ==
During Panama's Spanish colonial era, the area around Paraiso was a stop on the overland route between the Atlantic and the Pacific. It was visited mostly during the isthmus' dry season and it was said that from the hill overlooking Paraiso, the tower of old Panama City's cathedral, eight miles away, could be seen on a clear day.

In the 1850s, Paraiso was made a rail stop on the Panama Railroad, though it was little more than a village with an exceptional natural spring. In 1882, when the French Canal Company began work, Paraiso was the southernmost point of French dry season excavation effort. Decauville dumping cars continued to carry soil out of the area for years, though by the end of the 19th century, canal works were little more than a token effort and the population of Paraiso was about 800, living in 125 frame houses and 100 huts.

== Canal construction era ==
In 1904, when the US purchased the French Company’s rights and properties, the Americans arriving in Paraiso found many of the French Company’s buildings and machine shops still usable, so they refurbished many of them. The French machine shops were used for light repairs to locomotives and excavators until 1908 when work shifted to Gorgona and Empire. In 1908, as canal work was reorganized, Paraiso’s shops were abandoned and used mostly for storage, so Paraiso was used primarily as a residential community for employees working on the Pedro Miguel Locks and railroad workers based in Pedro Miguel. During these early days, American locomotive engineers were considered Paraiso's aristocracy.

Construction-era Paraiso was at the edge of excavation works and was occasionally subject to landslides. Nevertheless, the town had its own commissary, post office, hospital, church, lodge hall, a public market and even a bandstand. In 1905, a Coca-Cola bottling plant was established in the town to take advantage of the pure water in the nearby Paraiso natural spring. This spring also supplied drinking water to Corozal and many construction-era towns. The bottling plant was eventually sold to the Panama Coca-Cola Company and moved out of Paraiso at the end of the construction era.

Paraiso hosted two US presidents during the construction era. In 1906, President Theodore Roosevelt stopped in Paraiso by rail to address the workers and inspect the progress of excavations. He was followed in 1910 by President William H. Taft, who also addressed workers in Paraiso during his fifth visit to the isthmus.

== Paraiso, CZ ==
In July 1913, the Dredging Division (heir to the construction-era Sixth Division) chose Paraiso as its headquarters, and the town's machine shops were once again refurbished to repair dredges used to keep the Culebra Cut open.

By 1918, the Dredging Division's workforce was reduced as the danger of landslides abated. Paraiso's American work force was moved to the nearby town of Pedro Miguel and Paraiso became a segregated “silver” town. Paraiso’s residential areas were divided into subdivisions named Jamaica Town, Hamilton Hill and Spanish Town.

In 1936, the Dredging Division was officially relocated to the town of Gamboa and Paraiso was abandoned as a Canal Zone settlement. It was fully abandoned in 1938 and became a military post in November 1939.

Camp Paraiso became home to troops of the Fifth Infantry, who built barracks, quarters, a post exchange and a movie theater. The post was tasked with defending the canal, but by 1943 it was closed as a military camp.

In 1944, Paraiso became a Canal Zone town once again. The Army quarters were remodeled into family quarters and barracks into bachelor housing. The Army theater and post exchange became the town’s clubhouse, the commissary was reopened and a new school was built for the elementary grades. This school later became Paraiso Junior High School.

During the 1950s, the town was further developed and improved and was considered one of the Canal Zone’s most modern communities. In 1953, 230 masonry quarters replaced the earlier wooden quarters. These were built by the firm of Tucker McClure, which in February 1952 was awarded a contract for $1,664,866 to build the town's new houses in just over one year. Two years later, in 1955, a new civic center was opened. It was the first of the Canal Zone’s civic centers to be built for that purpose, and included a post office, first aid station, luncheonette and meeting room. It was also the first building in the Canal Zone through whose roof trees grow on purpose. Further additions to Paraiso included a new commissary and a new high school, inaugurated in 1956.

Modern Paraiso had its neighborhoods like its predecessor did. In the early 1950s, the town's modern housing was completed. There was Lakeview near the Canal, Spanish Town along the Gaillard Highway, Jamaica Town near the baseball diamond, Ghost Town next to the French cemetery, Beverly Hills in the “heights” area of Paraiso near the water tower, and Dogpatch just below Beverly Hills.

Paraisanos during the Canal Zone era were renowned for their civic pride, their excellent schools and the pride of the Paraiso High School Bengals. The town remained a de facto segregated town until the abolition of the Canal Zone in 1979.

== Paraiso, RP ==
Most of Paraiso was reverted to the Republic of Panama during the 1980s in compliance with the Panama Canal Treaties of 1977. By the mid-1980s, the town ceased to be served by the Panama Railroad, which fell into complete disrepair after being transferred to the Panamanian state as a public entity. This was a direct violation of the same treaty that gave Paraiso to Panama. Though the Panama Railroad, under private administration, has now resumed service, it no longer stops in Paraiso or Pedro Miguel, whose PR station was demolished in the late 1990s.

Panama's new Centennial Bridge, which crosses the Panama Canal, was built just north of Paraiso in the early 21st century and inaugurated hastily in 2004. Just above the town is a spot where the East Access of the Centennial Bridge highway crosses the continental divide.

== See also ==
- Postage stamps and postal history of the Canal Zone
