= Gustavo A. Mellander =

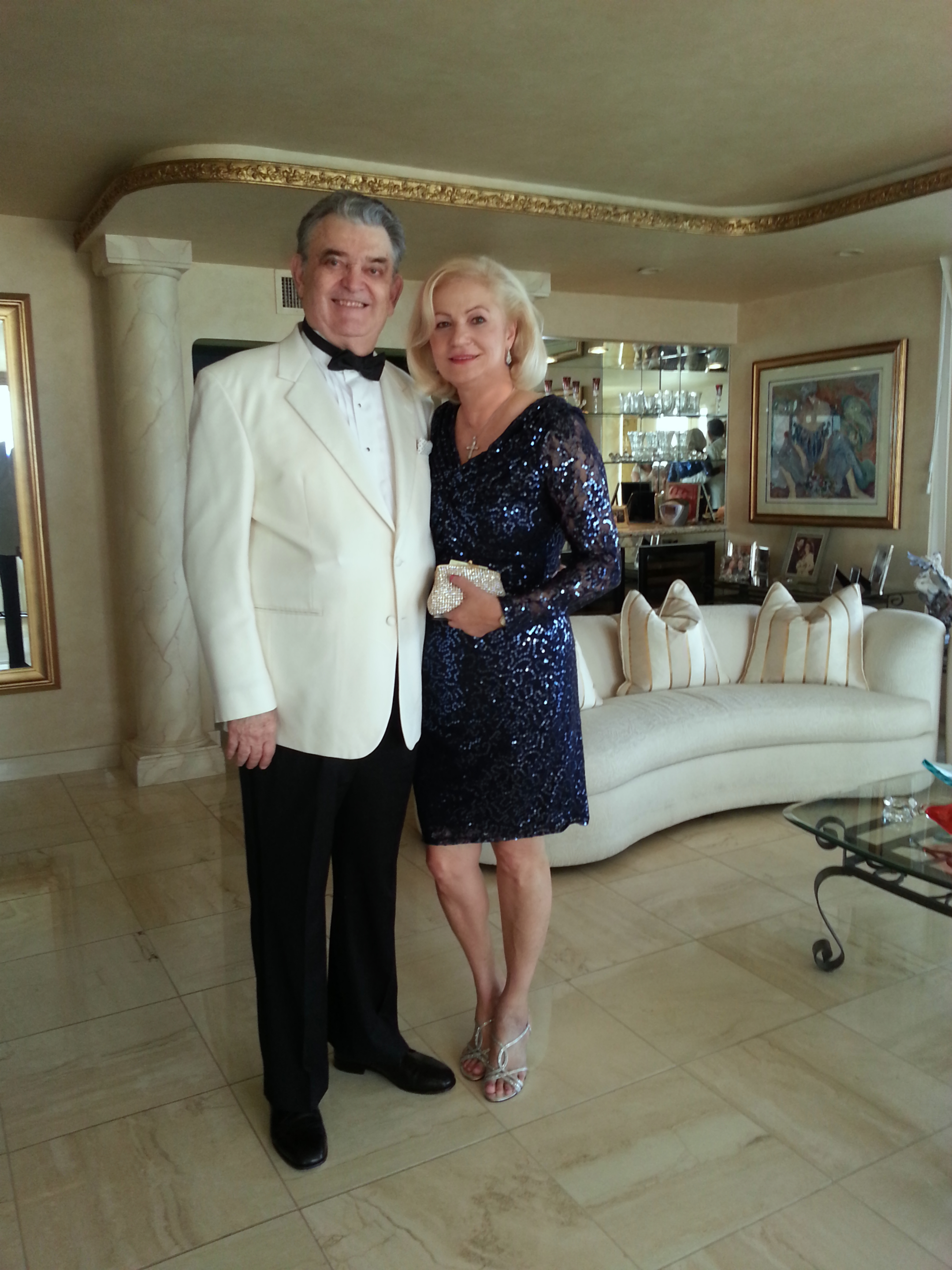
Gustavo Mellander and his wife, Nelly Maldonado Mellander

Gustavo "Gus" Adolfo Mellander is a leader in the field of university and college administration in the United States. He served as dean of academic affairs and interim chancellor at Inter American University of Puerto Rico, 1964–69, dean of York College, 1969–72, president of Passaic College in New Jersey from 1975 to 1985, president of Mission College, 1985, chancellor of the West Valley-Mission College District (consisting of two colleges) in California from 1985 to 1992, and subsequently as Dean of a Graduate School at George Mason University. In 1981, the governor of New Jersey appointed him to the state board of education. In 1999, he was offered the chancellorship of 14 colleges in the United Arab Emirates. Since 2000, he has been president of Academic Resources, an academic research company.

== Background ==
Mellander was born in California and lived in many Latin American countries. He earned a Ph.D. in history from George Washington University in 1966 and later received a Doctor of Humane Letters by Felician University in 1977. He was selected to attend the American Council on Education's Institute for Academic Deans and later its Institute for College Presidents.

He has served as a faculty member, a department chair, a division chair, a university dean at several institutions, a president at two colleges, a district chancellor of a two-college district with a student body of 35,000, and lastly as a graduate school university dean at George Mason University. He also served as a dean of business affairs and a university chancellor in interim capacities. He is a founding member of the American Association of University Administrators.

Later, he helped establish a National Institute to train college presidents.

In August 1975, he was named president of Passaic College. He immediately commenced a major housecleaning, suspending or putting one-third of the student body on probation, replacing over 40 teachers and administrators, and terminating 75 percent of the non-teaching employees. The college was also on the verge of losing its accreditation. Within three years Mellander corrected the problems and the college was fully accredited for the first time in its history. The college became a leader in establishing high academic standards.

In 1985, he was named president of Mission College, in Santa Clara, California. After five weeks at that position, he was appointed Chancellor of West Valley- Mission College District, which included Mission College as well as West Valley College. While there he raised academic standards and increased the District's outreach programs to better serve working adults.

He instituted a program so that every faculty member could receive a laptop to work beyond their college offices. Both colleges were re-accredited under his leadership, both colleges increased their minority populations, and new programs were created to serve Silicon Valley.

In 1992, he left California to direct a doctoral program at George Mason University. After one month, he was appointed dean of a Graduate School. The school was in serious accreditation difficulty and had suffered weak academic leadership and poor faculty morale. Mellander corrected all the problems in three years receiving full accreditation in 1995.

Mellander helped establish several doctoral programs. He taught doctoral-level leadership courses at Lehigh University, Inter American University, and George Mason University. He has also lectured doctoral candidates at Columbia University, Seton Hall University, Fairleigh Dickinson University and George Mason University, and the University of Puerto Rico.

He established Latin American Studies Departments at three universities and wrote several books on Latin America, including the critically acclaimed "The United States in Panamanian Politics: The Intriguing Formative Years." Danville, Ill.: Interstate Publishers. OCLC 138568. It was categorized as a "best seller" at the United Nations and is widely quoted in academic and diplomatic circles.

In 1999, he and his wife Nelly Maldonado Mellander co-authored Charles Edward Magoon: The Panama Years.

He has also written or co-authored books on Malaysia and Singapore, United States history, and a book analyzing college presidents. For over 36 years he has contributed a column every month to The Hispanic Outlook in Higher Education magazine. Many of these columns have been reprinted in academic journals

After serving as the dean of academic affairs at Inter American University and later at York College of Pennsylvania, he was appointed a director at the New Jersey Department of Higher Education. There he exercised academic program approval and financial overview for 38 colleges and universities. He worked closely with those institutions and the New Jersey Department of Higher Education. He helped draft legislation and upon its passage, he authored statewide implementation standards.

Mellander served on the American Council on Education's New Jersey Panel for the Advancement of Women in Higher Education. He is a founding member of the American Association of University Administrators and was elected to its first board of trustees.

He also served on a city school board of education as well as on the New Jersey State Board of Education. He was appointed to several college boards and national commissions. He chaired Governor-elect Thomas H. Kean's Higher Education transition team in 1981.

In April 1985, he was awarded a Congressional Citation by the United States House of Representatives for his achievements in higher education.

He has served on 53 college accreditation or state licensure teams and as a consultant to numerous colleges. He also helped write a Higher Education Master Plan for Hungary in the 1990s.

In 1999, he was offered the Chancellorship of 14 colleges in the United Arab Emirates but did not accept. He is a founding member of the Center for International Education at George Mason University.

In 1992, he was appointed a Graduate School Dean as well as Professor of Educational Leadership and College Administration at George Mason University in Fairfax, Virginia. In 1995 he was selected by a university-wide secret faculty vote as the best administrator at George Mason University.

His research interests include the role of educational leaders, how colleges transform themselves, and faculty as change agents. He is presently a Contributing Editor of The Hispanic Outlook in Higher Education and writes a monthly column. His brother Karl James Mellander graduated from the University of California-Berkeley (Astronomy and Physics) where he worked until he retired. Their grandfather Fredrik Mellander was Knighted by the King of Sweden in 1938 for his contributions to Swedish Higher Education.

== Publications ==
In 2014, to commemorate the 100 year anniversary of the opening of the Panama Canal, The Library of Congress compiled and published "Reference Guide to Panama Materials At The Library." It is available to scholars and the general public worldwide on the Internet.

Two of Mellander's books were highlighted: "Gustavo A. Mellander, wrote two books which are considered essential for the study of the early diplomatic relations between Panama and the United States: Charles Edward Magoon: The Panama Years (Río Piedras, PR: Editorial Plaza Mayor, 1999) and The United States in Panamanian Politics: The Intriguing Formative Years (Danville, IL: Interstate Printers and Publishers, 1971)."

Professor Mellander has authored or co-authored 13 books, written 100 book reviews, and over 400 articles for the federal government, academic journals, and magazines throughout North and South America. The library at Villanova University has collected over 400 of Mellander's articles and books and placed them on the Internet for scholarly research.

== Selected bibliography ==
- Mellander, Gustavo A., "Implementing Common Core State Standards" Center for Education Policy, George Washington University, May 2014
- Mellander, Gustavo A., "Why Teachers Resist Blended Learning" Education Digest, September 2012
- Mellander, Gustavo A.,"High Tech: Help or Hindrance to Hispanics in College." Education Digest, May 2007
- Mellander, Gustavo A., Mellander, Nelly, Charles Edward Magoon: The Panama Years. Río Piedras, Puerto Rico: Editorial Plaza Mayor. ISBN 1-56328-155-4. OCLC 42970390. (1999)
- Vaughan, George, Mellander, Gustavo A. "The College Presidency" (1997)
- Mellander, Gustavo A., Robertson, Bruce, "Transition and Transformation: Academic Roots and the Community College Future," Prisoners of Elitism: The Community College's Struggle for Stature Jossey Bass (Fall 1992)
- Mellander, Gustavo A., Prochaska, Fred, The Diversity Challenge: A Collection of Model Community College Programs. West Valley-Mission Colleges. Saratoga: CA. 1991
- Mellander, Gustavo A., Hubbard, Gary, Drug Abuse: A District College Responds. West Valley-Mission Colleges. Saratoga: CA. 1989
- Mellander, Gustavo A., "Student Enrollment: Ways to Maintain the Commitment," Controversies and Decision Making in Difficult Times, New Directions Series, New York: Jossey Bass (1986)
- Mellander, Gustavo A., "A Time for Masterful Designers," The Journal of General Education (Summer 1980)
- Mellander, Gustavo A., Testimony relative to "Basic Skills" legislation at U.S. Senate Subcommittee on Education. Washington, DC (July 24, 1979)
- Mellander, Gustavo A., "Introduction" to Wayne Bray, The Common Law Zone in Panama. San Juan: Puerto Rico, Inter American University Press (1977)
- Mellander, Gustavo A., "Educational Alternative: Return to the Basics," The New York Sunday Times NY:NY (April 17, 1977)
- Mellander, Gustavo A., Hatch, Carl E., The York Dispatch Index: The War-Torn 1940s, York, PA: The Strine Publishing Company (1974)
- Mellander, Gustavo A., Hatch, Carl E., The York Dispatch Index: The Depression 1930s York, PA.: The Strine Publishing Company (1973)
- Mellander, Gustavo A., Hatch, Carl E., York County's Presidential Elections, York, PA: The Strine Publishing Company (1972)
- Mellander, Gustavo A., The United States in Panamanian Politics: The Intriguing Formative Years." Danville, Ill.: Interstate Publishers. OCLC 138568. (1971)
- Maday, Bela, Mellander, Gustavo A., et al., Malaysia and Singapore, Washington, DC: Government Printing Office, 745 pp. (1966)
- Legters, Lyman, Mellander, Gustavo A., (Research Associate), et al., Area Handbook for Panama, Washington, DC: Government Printing Office, 588 pp. (1962)
- Barnett, Clifford, Mellander, Gustavo A., (Research Associate), et al., Area Handbook for Cuba, Washington, DC: Government Printing Office, 576 pp. (1961)

Professor Mellander has authored or co-authored 13 books, written 100 book reviews, and over 400 articles for the federal government, academic journals, and magazines throughout North and South America. The library at Villanova University has collected over 400 of Mellander's articles and books and placed them on the Internet for scholarly research.
