= Gamboa, Panama =

Coordinates: 09°07′N 79°42′W

Gamboa
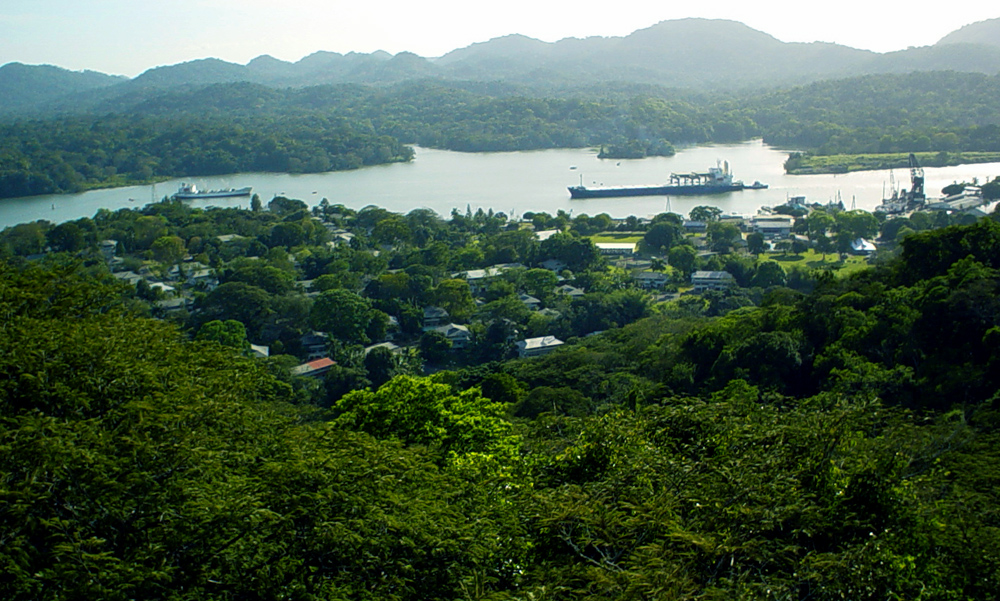
- Interactive map of Gamboa

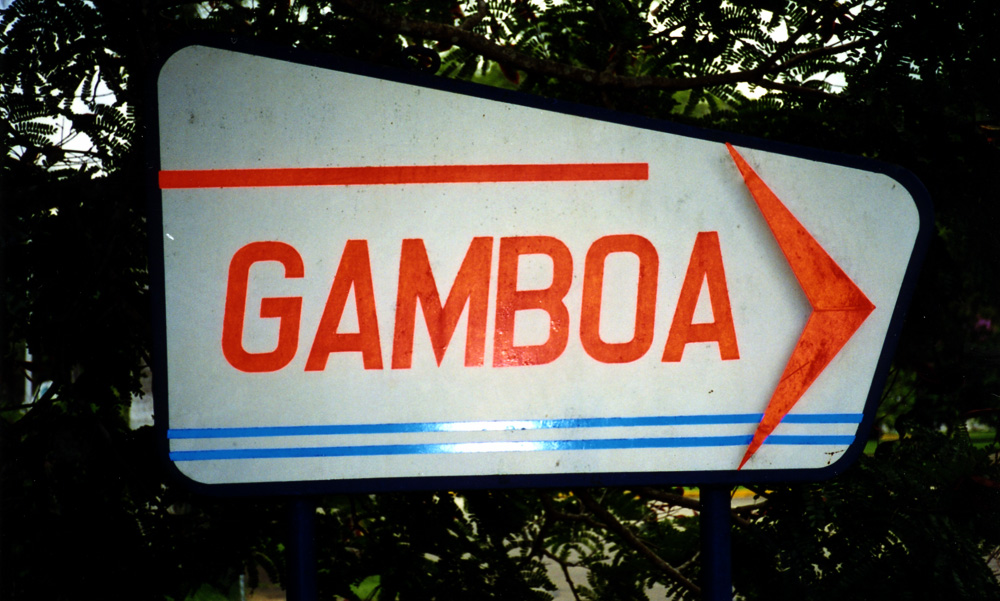
Gamboa's Canal Zone style sign, Gaillard Hwy

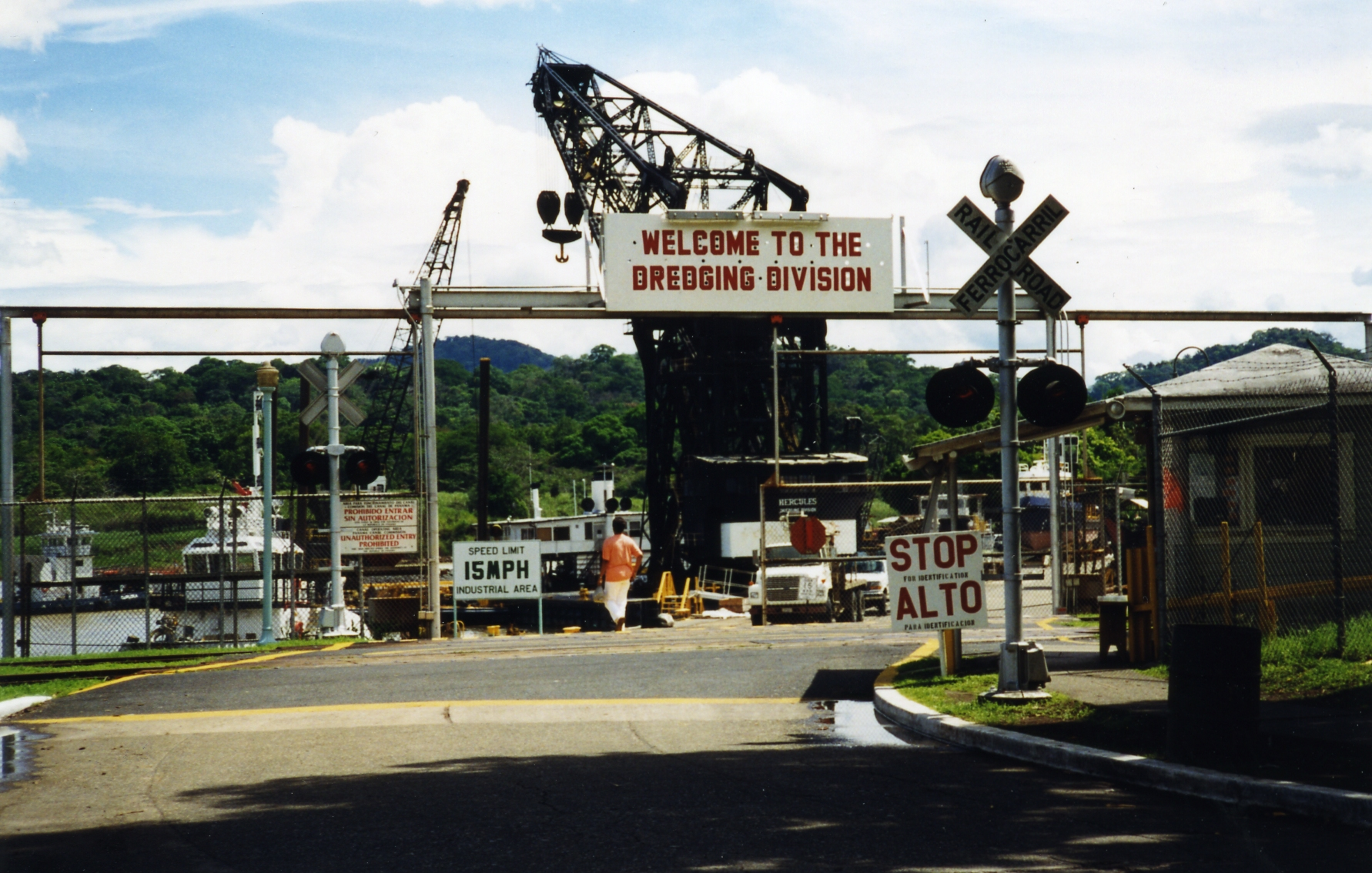
Entrance to the Panama Canal Dredging Division

Gamboa is a small town in corregimiento of Cristóbal in the Colón Province, Panama close to the Panama Canal and the Chagres River. It was one of a handful of permanent Canal Zone townships, built to house employees of the Panama Canal and their dependents. The name Gamboa is the name of a tree of the quince family.

Gamboa is considered an attractive location for ecotourism.

== Location ==
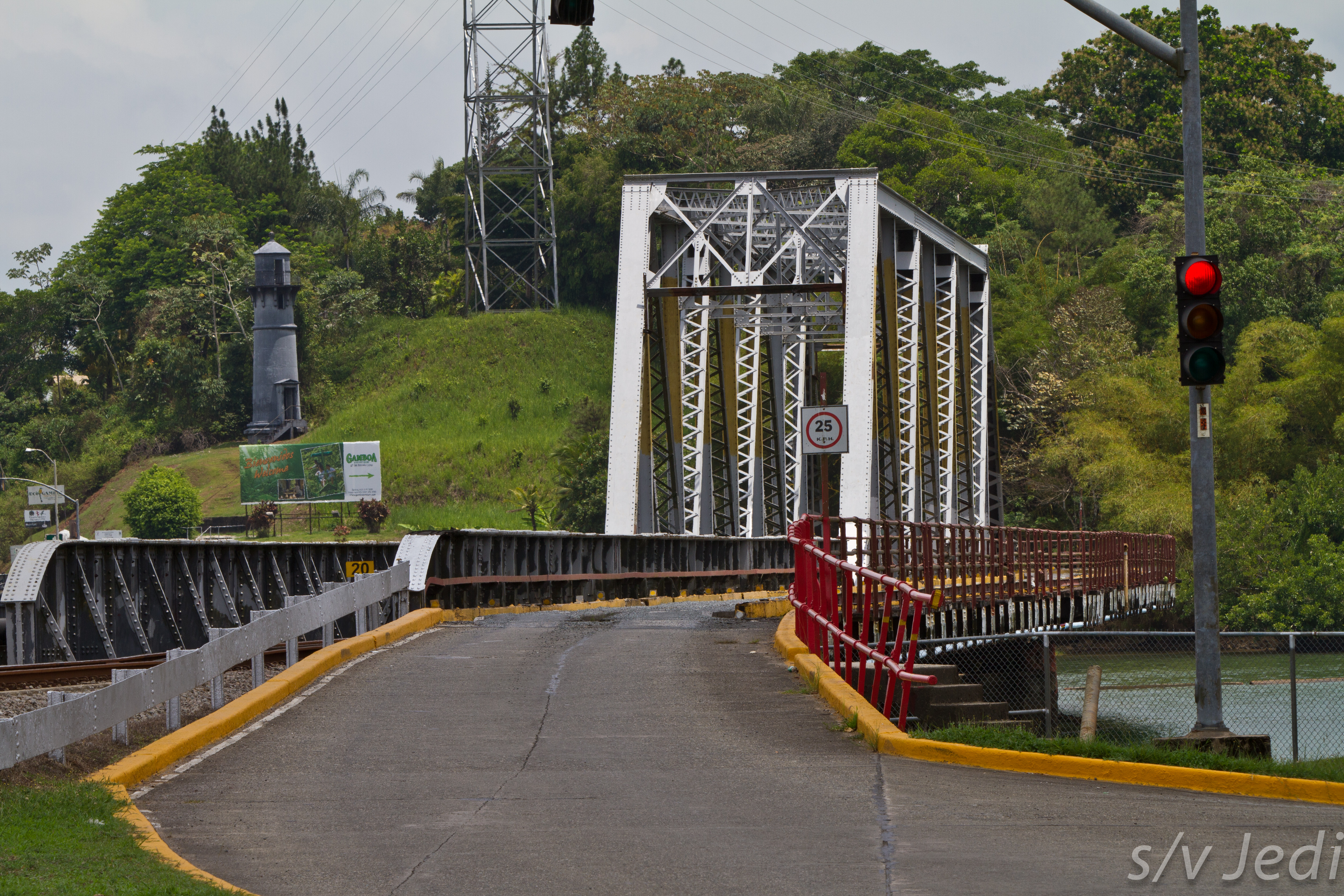
The old single lane bridge with its traffic light

Gamboa is located on a sharp bend of the Chagres River at the point which feeds Lake Gatun. Just south of Gamboa, Lake Gatun and the Chagres meet the Culebra Cut (Gaillard Cut) where the Canal cuts through the Continental Divide. Thus, though Gamboa is closer to the Pacific side of Panama, its watershed is on the Atlantic side. A single lane iron and wood bridge that crossed the Chagres and was the only road access to Gamboa for most of its history. This bridge is still intact today, but in October 2018 a new 2-lane bridge was completed near the original site.

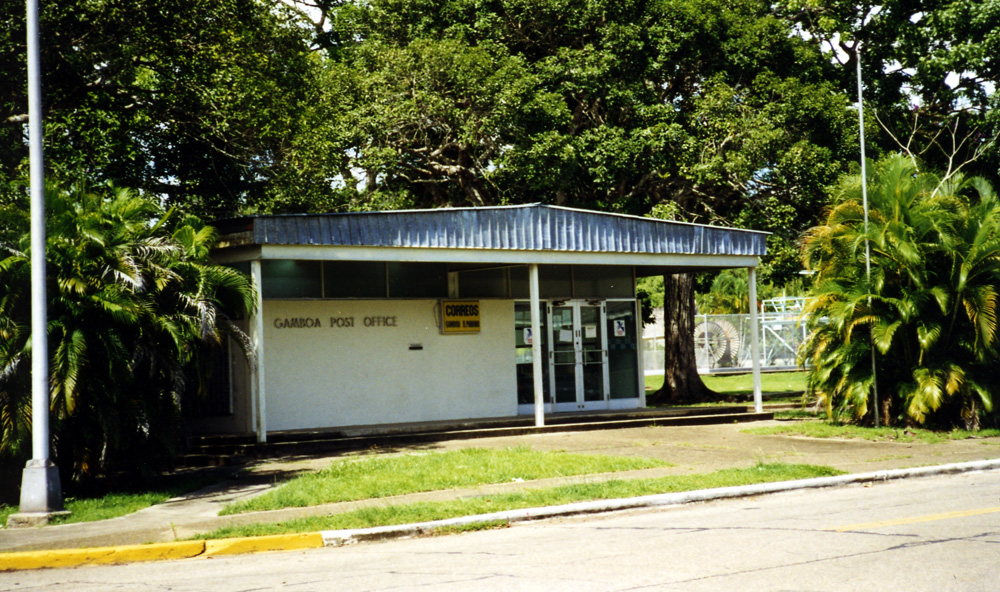
Gamboa's Post Office, 61 Gaillard Hwy

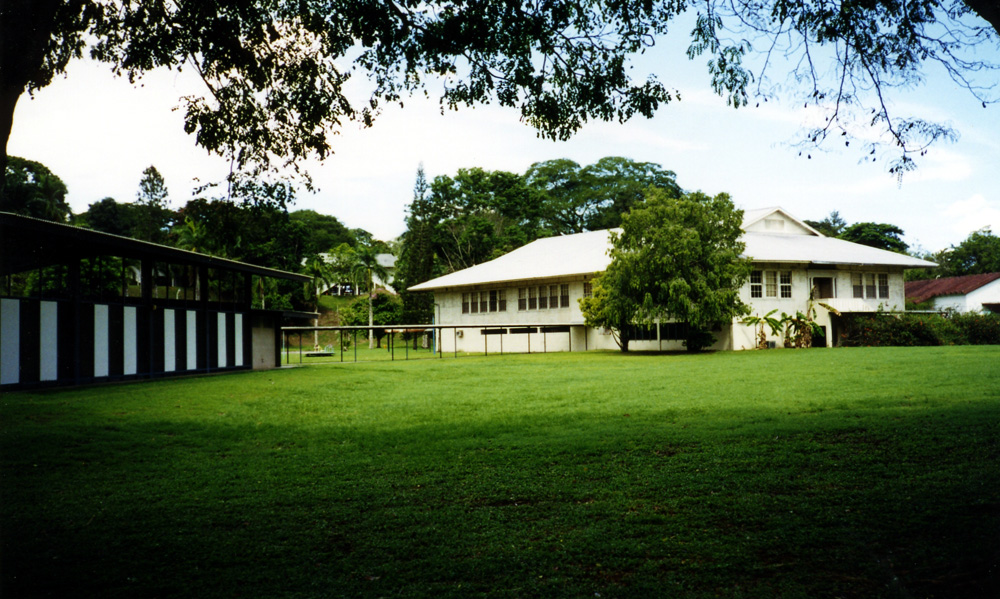
The former Gamboa Elementary School

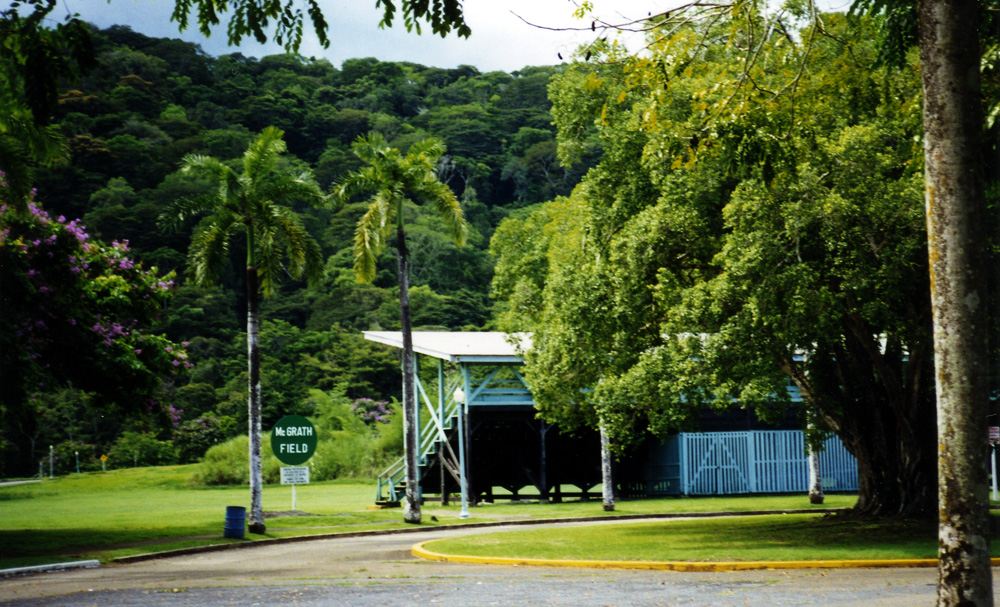
Gamboa's McGrath Field, seen from Maltby Pl.

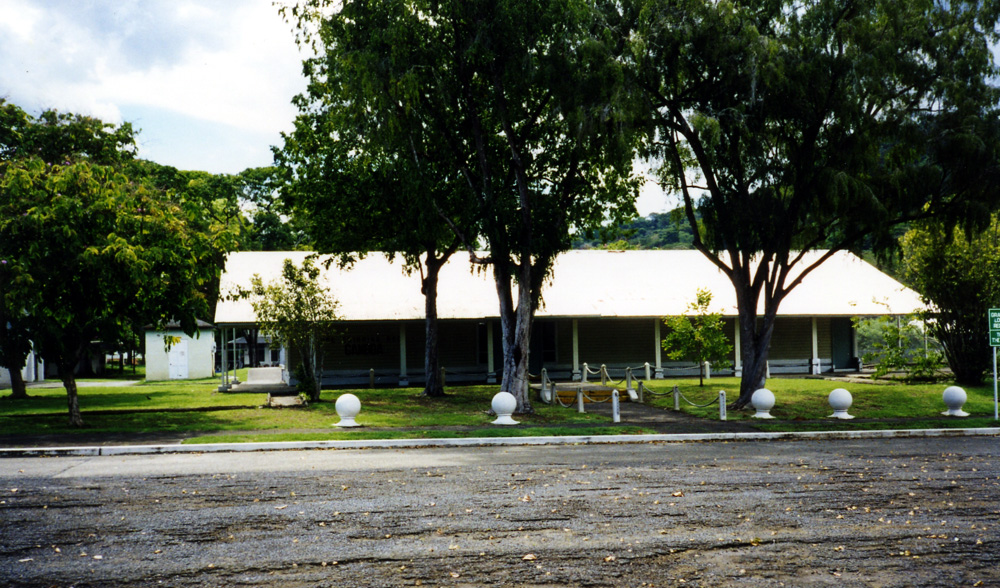
Gamboa's Swimming Pool, 65 Maltby Place

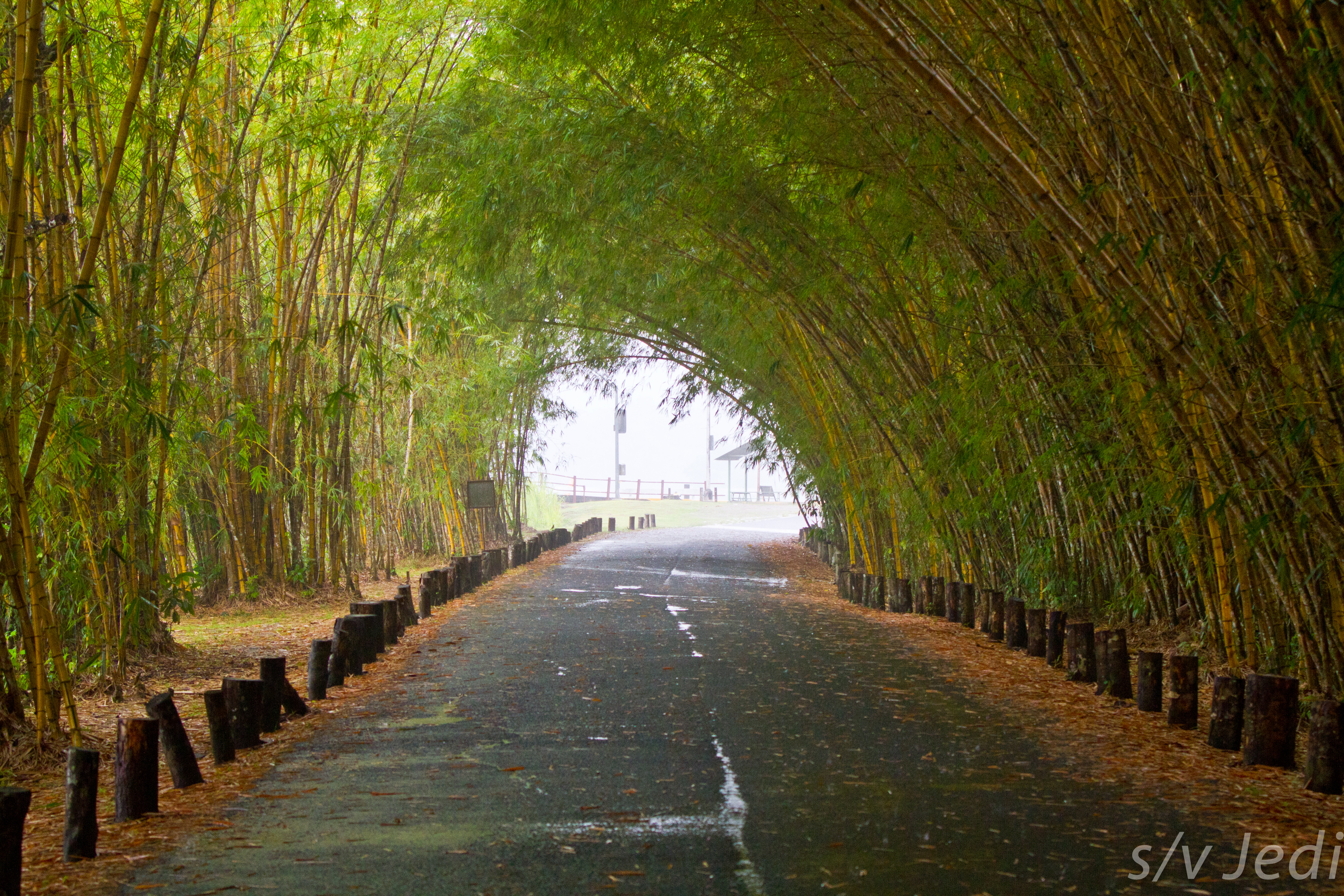
Goethals Boulevard, Gamboa

== History ==
Gamboa was built near the site of the former village of Santa Cruz. Three miles further up the Chagres river was the town of Las Cruces, where 19th-century travelers and cargo disembarked from river barges to take the overland Las Cruces trail by mule. After the completion of the Panama Railroad in 1855, the railroad ran near the area, but made no stops and no PR maps list any towns in Gamboa's present location.

Present-day Gamboa was built in 1911, during Canal construction. It was initially populated by "silver roll" (i.e., Afro-Antilleans and other non-US, non-white) workers and their dependents. These initial settlers, counted at around 700, had previously lived in the construction areas between the former towns of Tabernilla and Gorgona, which were covered by Lake Gatun as Canal construction advanced. No Americans were counted amongst the town's first inhabitants.

By 1914, at the conclusion of Canal construction activities, Gamboa's population decreased to 173 and the town consisted of a police station, a four-family house which had been brought in from the former town of Empire, and a two-family house brought from the former town of Culebra, and several old railroad box cars used to house silver roll employees. The first commissary, operated by a division of the Panama Canal Company/Canal Zone Government, also operated out of three box cars.

After many years of studies and debates, and lobbying by Dredging Division Superintendent John G. Claybourn, the Panama Canal Company moved its Dredging Division from the town of Paraíso to Gamboa in 1936. In 1933, when a three-man board appointed by Canal Zone Governor J.L. Schley studied the feasibility of moving the Dredging Division to Gamboa, the population was 251, including just 10 Americans. The first Dredging Division families began moving into the newly built town of Gamboa in September 1936. Within a year, the town's population jumped to 1,419 and by 1942, the town reached its peak population—3,853.

The new residents of Gamboa built their civic center with their own hands and funds. It was initially used as a USO to entertain troops stationed in nearby hills, but later became headquarters of the Civic Council. The Civic Council and Gamboa's residents also built the Gamboa Golf and Country Club, on the Gamboa Ridge, overlooking the Chagres river. The men in the town hammered, sawed and poured concrete while the women brought picnic lunches and tended barbecues. The club was officially opened on January 1, 1939, and eventually included a 9-hole golf course.

Gamboa, like most Canal Zone towns, had its own commissary, post office, school, churches (five of them), railroad station, fire station and gas station. For much of the town's history, Gamboa's non-US, non-white population lived in a separate part of town called Santa Cruz. This included 50 families moved from La Boca in October 1954 when that town was depopulated and converted into a white housing area.

Not all Gamboans worked for the Dredging Division. Because of its remote location and distance from other Canal Zone towns, Gamboa was seen as less desirable than some of the other Panama Canal Company/Canal Zone Government's townships, and since housing in the Canal Zone was assigned based on seniority, many of the new arrivals to the "Zone", as it became known to its residents (Zonians), were initially assigned housing here before becoming eligible for housing in other towns. U.S. military personnel and their dependents lived in Gamboa during the 1940s due to the shortage of housing on the local military bases. U.S. personnel continued living in Gamboa until the total withdrawal of U.S. troops from Panama in 1999.

Over time as the Panama Canal Company/Canal Zone Government began to transfer operations to Panama following the 1977 Panama Canal Treaties, some of the services offered in Gamboa were shut down. The most visible closures were the commissary and movie theater, which were boarded up throughout the 1980s. The demise of the Panama Railroad in the late 1980s further cut the town off from the rest of the Canal area.

Gamboa's elementary school was built in 1937 by the Panama Canal Company/Canal Zone Government Division of Schools. It consisted of 3 classrooms, a library, and principal's office upstairs, with a kindergarten classroom underneath. The school was transferred to the Department of Defense Dependents Schools (DoDDS) in 1979 after the abolition of the Canal Zone and its government. That school year, its total enrollment was 115. Three U.S. grade school teachers were employed and classes were paired up, with first and second grade sharing one room, third and fourth grade sharing a room, and fifth and sixth grade sharing the third classroom. A physical education teacher was also employed for the school's gymnasium, which was inside a separate building. Since December 1980, a small space underneath the school has operated as a mini-shopette. Total enrollment for the 1987–1988 school year was down to 53. In June 1988, with a projected enrollment of just 40 students for the 1988–1989 school year, DoDDS closed the Gamboa Elementary School. Starting in 1988, all students were bused to Balboa Elementary. Following Operation "Just Cause" in December 1989, the school building was used as a local headquarters for U.S. Military Police.

Gamboa's golf course became a Boy Scout camp for several years, but remained inactive in the last years of the Treaty reversion period.

== Gamboa today ==
The town of Gamboa is still inhabited, but as a shadow of its former self. Many of its houses are not inhabited and several public buildings are underutilized. It remains the primary headquarters of the Dredging Division of the Panama Canal Authority (formerly PCC).

The Dredging Division's docks are used by light ferries to reach the Smithsonian Tropical Research Institute (STRI) facilities at Barro Colorado Island.

Gamboa is home to caymans, crocodiles, iguanas, and several hundred bird species. Given its location at the "end of the road" and the single road connecting it to the rest of the Canal Zone, Gamboa is adjacent to significant tracts of relatively undisturbed rainforest. A trail that follows an old pipeline ("Pipeline Road") is considered one of the best birding hikes in Panama. It is one of the premiere bird watching sites in all of Central America. Many amateur birdwatchers join ornithologists for yearly bird counts held near Gamboa by the Audubon Society of Panama.

The old Spanish colonial era Las Cruces Trail used to carry precious metals and supplies between the Atlantic and Pacific oceans passes near Gamboa, though parts of it are now underwater.

== In popular culture ==
In the movie The Tailor of Panama the character played by Pierce Brosnan stays at the Gamboa Rainforest Resort, and has a meal at a waterside restaurant in Gamboa. In the background of the opening shot of this sequence, you can see the iron and wood bridge that leads to Gamboa, with an ocean liner behind it.

The Gamboa Rainforest Resort is a 5-star hotel located in Gamboa. The Resort has developed 2 Indian reservations (Embera and Wounaa) an aerial tram to visit the jungle canopy, and many other attractions which now draw many people to the otherwise sleepy town.

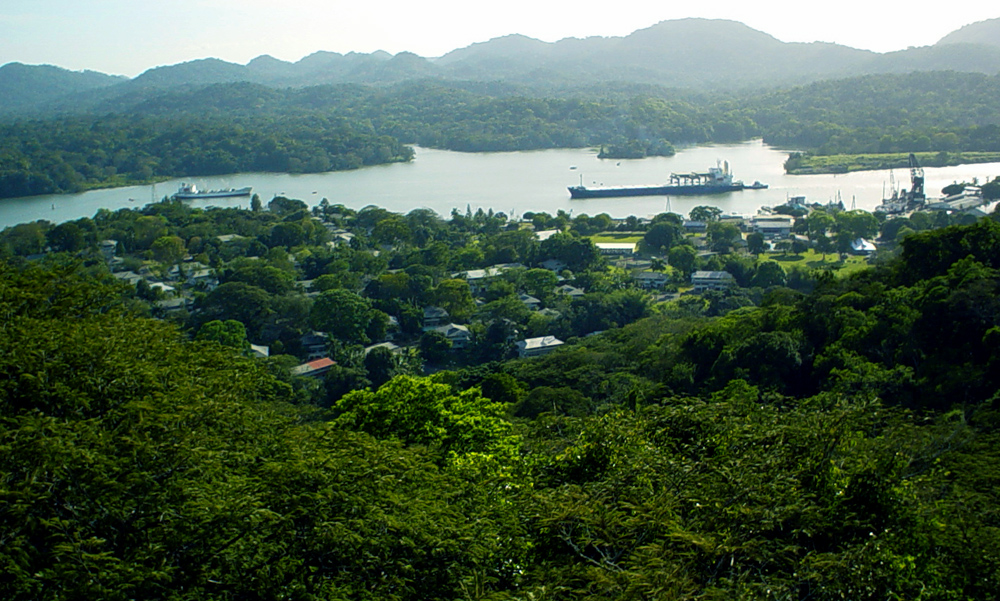
Gamboa and the Panama Canal as seen from the Gamboa Rainforest Resort's Canopy Tower.

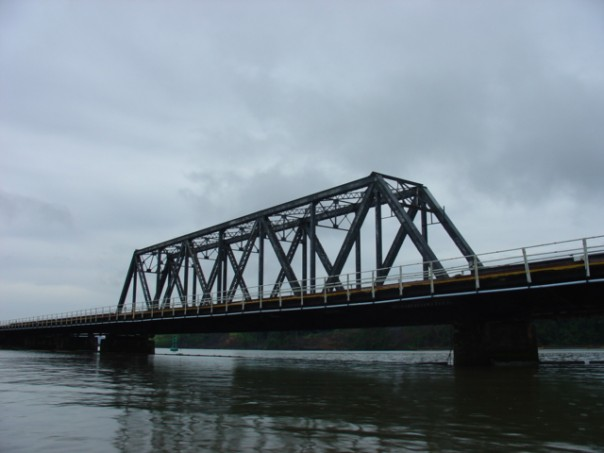
The single lane bridge into Gamboa

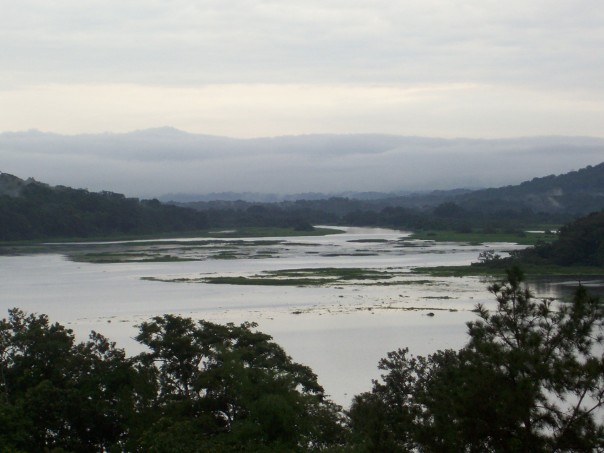
The Chagres River as seen from Rainforest Resort in Gamboa, Panama

== Literature ==
- The Panama Canal Review, "Your Town - Gamboa," Panama Canal Company, September 4, 1953.
- The Panama Canal Review, "Quarters Construction Program Nears End; 111 Apartments Will Be Ready In 60 Days," Panama Canal Company, December 3, 1954.
- Schooling in the Panama Canal Zone 1904-1979, Phi Delta Kappa Panama Canal Area, June 1980
