= List of former United States military installations in Panama =

This is a list of United States military installations in Panama, all of which fall within the former Canal zone. The U.S. military installations in Panama were turned over to local authorities by 1999.

== Transition phases ==
In 1903, the Hay–Bunau-Varilla Treaty was signed between Panama and the United States. It created the Panama Canal Zone as a U.S. governed region, and allowed the U.S. to build the Panama Canal. In 1977, the Panama Canal Treaty (also called Torrijos–Carter Treaties) was signed by Commander of Panama's National Guard, General Omar Torrijos and U.S. President Jimmy Carter. Over time, it would replace and absolve the 1903 treaty.

- 1 October 1979, the Panama Canal Zone was abolished. All unused area (mainly forest) was transferred to Panama. Also some non-military constructions, like hospitals and schools, were transferred to Panama.
- Between 1979 and 31 December 1999 U.S. transferred all military areas and constructions to Panama. Formal U.S. presence was ended by 2000. In total 95,293 acres (386 square kilometres) with 5,237 buildings were handed over. Their estimated value was some $4 billion USD.
- After the United States invasion of Panama in 1989, some installations were reactivated by the U.S. Still, these were disestablished by 2000.

== List ==
Former U.S. military installations in the Panama Canal Zone (1904–1999)
Name	Branch	Unit	Abandoned	Current name	Current use	Area	Coordinates
Galeta Island	Navy	CDAA (Wullenweber) radio detection	2002			Atlantic	9.40233°N 79.87217°W
Fort Randolph	Army	Coast Artillery Corps	1999			Atlantic, Margarita Island	9.38444°N 79.88778°W
Coco Solo	Navy	submarine base	1999	Manzanillo International Terminal	container terminal	Atlantic, near Colón	9.37262°N 79.8812°W
Fort De Lesseps	Army	Coast Artillery Corps	1955			Atlantic, Colón	9.36556°N 79.90500°W
Fort Sherman	Army	coastal defense, Jungle Operations Training Center	1999	harbour: Shelter Bay Marina	unused, marina	Atlantic, opposite Colón	9.36302°N 79.953035°W
France Field	Army, Air Force		1949	Enrique Adolfo Jiménez Airport	airfield	Atlantic, near Colón	9.35667°N 79.86750°W
Gatun Tank Farm	Navy	underground fuel storage with oil terminal at Cristobal	1991			Atlantic, near Gatun locks	9.31035°N 79.88425°W
Fort Gulick	Army	School of the Americas	1984, 1999	Fuerte Espinar	hotel Melia	Atlantic, Gatun locks	9.317°N 79.867°W
Fort William D. Davis	Army	infantry, jungle warfare training, special forces training	1995	Jose Dominador Bazan	residential area	Atlantic, Gatun locks	9.28892°N 79.90914°W
Semaphore Hill	Navy	long-range radar and communications link	1979, 1995	Canopy Tower	nature observatory	Inland, Culebra summit	9.07833°N 79.64889°W
Summit	Navy	Naval Communications Station Balboa, VLF (sender)				Inland, Culebra summit	9.07833°N 79.64889°W
Gorgas Hospital	Army	hospital, barracks	1999		Hospital	Ancon Hill	
Quarry Heights	DOD	HQ US Southern Command	1999		Headquarters	Ancon Hill	
Fort Clayton	Army	communications	1999	Ciudad del Saber	residential housing, schools, include campus of FSU-Panama	Miraflores locks	9.0001°N 79.5829°W
Albrook AFS	Air Force		1999	Albrook "Marcos A. Gelabert" International Airport (PAC)	regional civil airport, former campus of FSU-Panama	Pacific, near Balboa	8.9759000°N 79.5555306°W
Arraijan Tank Farm	Navy	underground fuel storage with oil terminal at Rodman	1997		civil usage (PATSA)	Pacific, opposite Balboa	8.95325°N 79.61466°W
Rodman Naval Station	Navy	harbor (Formerly called Balboa Naval Station, Canal Zone)	1999	Vasco Nuñez de Balboa Naval Base	Panamanian National Maritime Service	Pacific, opposite Balboa	8.95222°N 79.57306°W
Rodman Naval Station	Navy	harbor (Formerly called Balboa Naval Station, Canal Zone)	1999	PSA Panama International Terminal	container terminal	Pacific, opposite Balboa	8.95222°N 79.57306°W
Fort Amador	Army	Coast Artillery Corps	1999		recreation, new hotel (2001)	Pacific, near Balboa	8.93806°N 79.54778°W
Naval Communications Station Balboa	Navy	HQ radio communications				Pacific, near Fort Amador	8.93805°N 79.54900°W
Farfan	Navy	Naval Communications Station Balboa (receiver)		Radio Holland Panama	marine communications	Pacific, near Howard AFB	8.93222°N 79.58194°W
Howard Air Force Base	Air Force	24th Wing	1999	Panamá Pacífico International Airport (BLB)	international airport	Pacific, opposite Balboa	8.91500°N 79.59944°W
Fort Grant	Army	Coast Artillery Corps	1948	Islas Naos, Penco, Flamenco	tourism	Pacific, near Balboa	8.90806°N 79.52083°W
Fort Kobbe	Army	Coast Artillery Corps/193rd Infantry Brigade	2000	Panama Pacifico	real estate (development)	Pacific, near Howard AFB	8.900°N 79.583°W
Transisthmian Pipeline	Navy					cross-isthmus	

== See also ==
- Category:Panama Canal Zone Townships
- Naval Base Panama Canal Zone
