= 33rd Infantry Regiment (United States) =

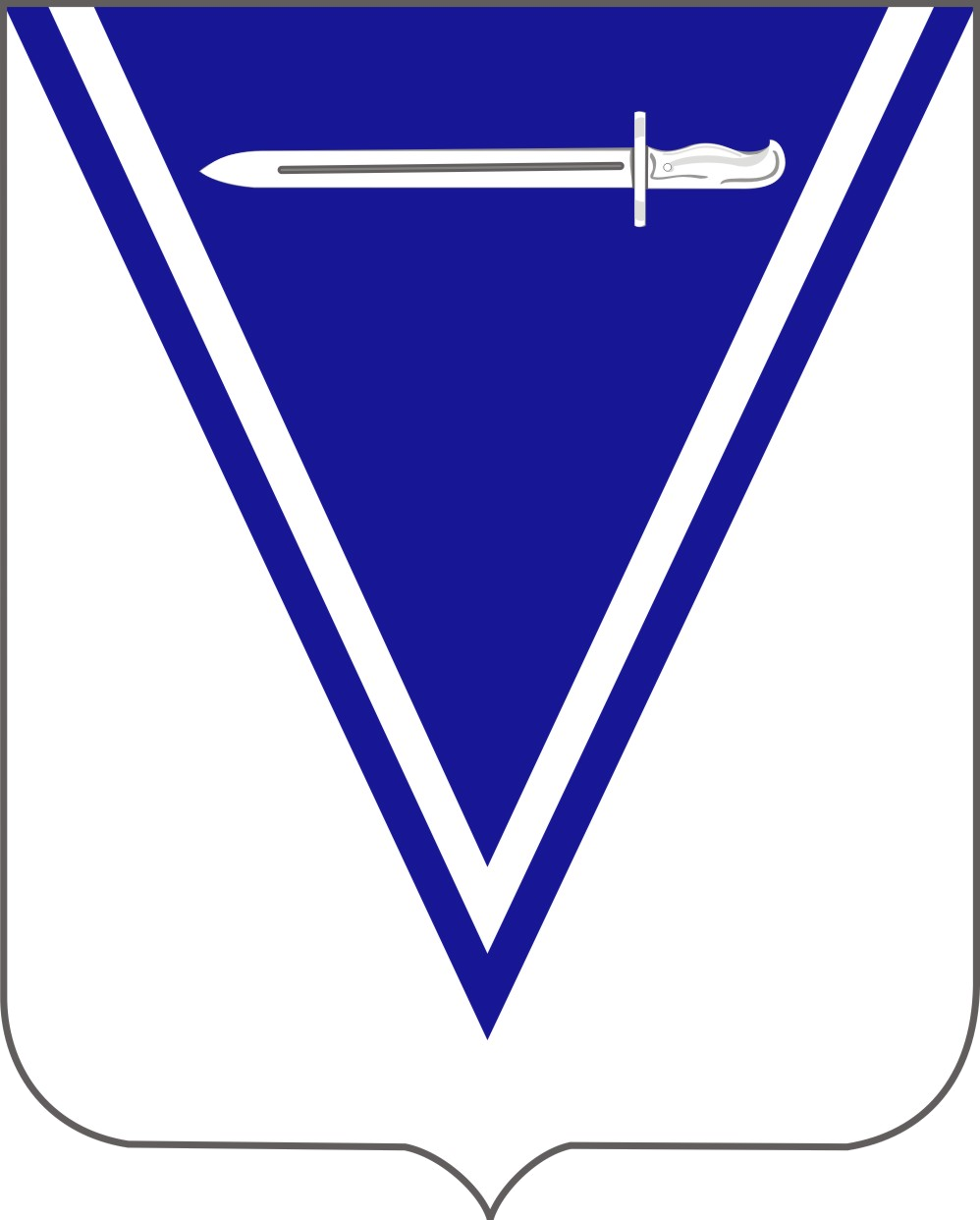
- Coat of arms
- Active: 1916-1956
- Country: United States
- Branch: United States Army
- Type: Infantry
- Size: Regiment
- Garrison/HQ: Panama; Aruba
- Motto: Ridentes Venimus (Smiling We Come)
- Engagements: World War II; Korean War as part of 65th Infantry

Commanders
- Notable commanders: John W. Heavey; Normando A. Costello

Insignia
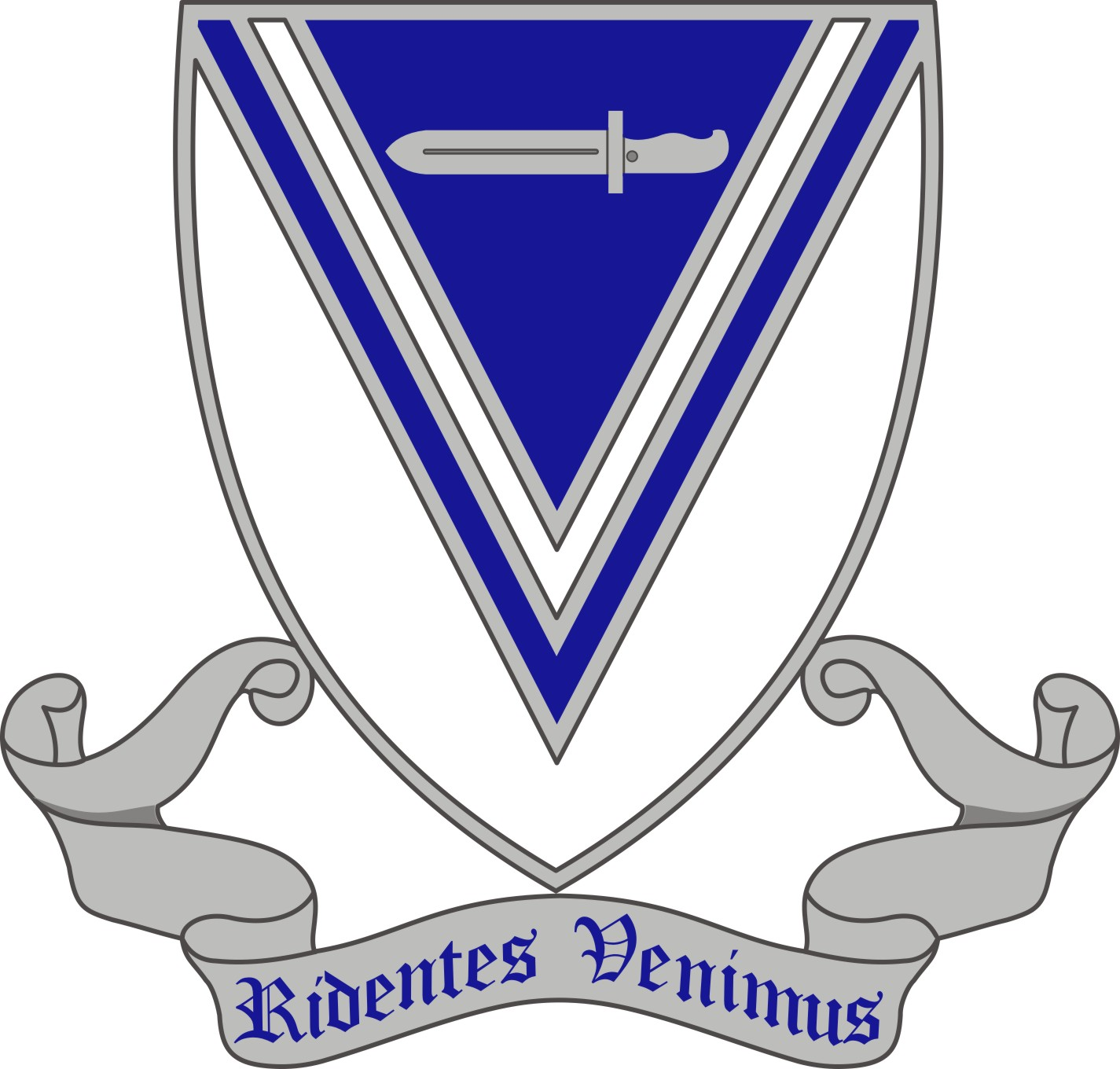
- Distinctive unit insignia

The 33rd Infantry Regiment was an American unit stationed in the Panama Canal Zone and Caribbean from 1916-56. Though providing troops for various other American military formations, the regiment had no battle honors of its own.

== History ==
Though other American regiments in the War of 1812 and American Civil War (33d Infantry Regiment, United States Colored Troops) formed from the 1st South Carolina Colored Infantry on 8 February 1864-disbanded 31 January 1866) had the designation of 33d Infantry, they have no lineage with the most recent 33d Infantry Regiment.

The 33d Infantry was activated on 6 July 1916 in accordance with War Department General Orders Number 22 dated 30 June 1916 that ordered seven new regiments to be organized; four in the Continental United States, one in the Philippine Islands (31st Infantry Regiment), one in Hawaii (32d Infantry Regiment), and one (the 33d Infantry) in the Canal Zone.

=== World War I ===
"In 1916, when the whole of Europe was engaged in the great war, the United States Congress enacted a law increasing our armed forces. On [sic] of the results of this act of congress was the organization of the 33d infantry which was formed in the Canal Zone July 6, 1916, and has remained on duty here ever since. The enlisted personnel of the regiment was originally drawn from the 5th and 10th infantry stationed at Camps Empire and Otis. During the construction days both camps were occupied by troops after being vacated by civilians. Major General Charles H. Muir was the first regiment commander. Headquarters, machine gun, supply companies, and companies A, B, C, D, E, and F were organized at Camp Empire. Companies G, H, I, J, K, L, and M were organized at Camp Otis. The band section was organized at Fort Jay, N.Y. During the first four years of it's [sic] existence, the 33d. infantry was distributed by battalions, and detachments, throughout the canal zone and the Republic of Panama. During the World War, it guarded Gatun Locks, the dam and spillway, the Monte Lirio and Mindi Bridges, the Chagres River Bridge at Gamboa, the Pedro Miguel and Miraflores locks, pier 18 and the dry dock at Balboa. During the period from 1916 to 1920, the regiment was engaged in exploring and charting the jungles of Panama.

=== Interwar period ===
As of June 1919, the 33rd Infantry was stationed at Gatun as a separate regiment. The 3rd Battalion was transferred in 1920 to Camp Gaillard, with the entire regiment transferred on 25 October 1920 to Fort Clayton. In November, 1920, the young regiment assembled as a unit for the first time at Fort Clayton. The new post was named in honor of Colonel Bertram T. Clayton, who had been killed in action in France on May 30, 1918. The event was chronicled by photographer J. Fisher on a six-foot panorama photo. The 33rd Infantry was assigned to the Panama Canal Division on 3 July 1921. Its primary wartime mission was to conduct a mobile defense of the beaches and inland sectors of the Atlantic side of the canal zone. It assisted Panama police with riot control during a tenants' strike from 12–23 October 1925 in Panama City. It was deployed to defensive positions 2 January 1931 to protect the Panama Canal during the Acción Comunal. It was attached to Headquarters, Pacific Sector on 15 April 1932 upon the inactivation of the Panama Canal Division. It provided the honor guard and security for President Franklin D. Roosevelt’s brief visit to the Panama Canal Zone in October 1935. It was relieved on 10 October 1938 from the Panama Canal Division, and relieved from attachment to the Pacific Sector on 16 February 1940 and assigned to the Panama Mobile Force.

=== World War II ===
In 1941 the regiment was transferred from the Panama Canal Department to the Caribbean Defense Command. On 6 September 1941, the 1st Battalion was sent to Trinidad, with elements of the battalion later transferring to Surinam to guard bauxite mines, protect the Dutch government-in-exile, and watch the border of French Guiana, which was controlled by Vichy France. The 2nd and 3rd Battalions later arrived at Fort Read in Trinidad. The 1st Battalion was withdrawn from Surinam in June 1943 and moved to Aruba.

In March 1944, the regiment departed Trinidad, arriving in New York City in 1944, the first time the regimental colors arrived on continental American soil. The regiment was assigned to the Fourth United States Army at Camp Claiborne, Louisiana. Many of the regiment volunteered for Merrill's Marauders and were sent to Burma as the 2nd Battalion, 5307th Composite Unit (Provisional). The regiment was inactivated on 26 June 1944.

=== Cold War ===
The 33d Infantry was reactivated at Fort Clayton in February 1946, inactivated again in September 1948 at Fort Gulick, then reactivated at Fort Kobbe, Canal Zone. During the Korean War the 3rd Battalion of the 33d was transferred to the 65th Infantry Regiment for war service.

The 33rd Infantry became part of the Americal Division in the Canal Zone on 2 December 1954, with the regiment being inactivated again on 26 May 1956, the assets of the unit being used to reactivate the 20th Infantry Regiment.

== Lineage ==
Constituted 1 July 1916 in the Regular Army as the 33rd Infantry. Organized 5–7 July 1916 in the Canal Zone by the transfer of personnel from the 5th and 10th Infantry Regiments at Empire, and Camp Otis, Canal Zone. Inactivated 26 June 1944 at Camp Claiborne, Louisiana.Activated 1 February 1946 at Fort Clayton, Canal Zone. Inactivated 1 September 1948 at Fort Clayton. Activated 4 January 1950 at Fort Kobbe, Canal Zone. Inactivated 26 May 1956 at Fort Kobbe.

== Distinctive unit insignia ==
- Description

A Silver color metal and enamel device 1 1/4 inches (3.2 cm) in height overall consisting of a shield blazoned: Argent, a pile cottised Azure, charged with a sword bayonet fesswise of the field. Attached below and to the sides of the shield a Silver scroll inscribed “RIDENTES VENIMUS” in Blue letters.

- Symbolism

This Regiment was organized in the Canal Zone in 1916, and served there during World War I guarding the canal. This is symbolized by the cotises of Infantry blue on each side of a pile to represent the canal. The motto translates to “Smiling We Come.”

- Background

The distinctive unit insignia was approved on 8 January 1924.

== Coat of arms ==
=== Blazon ===
- Shield

Argent, a pile cottised Azure, charged with a sword bayonet fesswise of the field.

- Crest

None. Motto RIDENTES VENIMUS (Smiling We Come)

=== Symbolism ===
- Shield

This Regiment was organized in the Canal Zone in 1916, and served there during World War I guarding the canal. This is symbolized by the cotises of Infantry blue on each side of a pile to represent the canal.

- Crest

None.

=== Background ===
The coat of arms was approved on 2 March 1921.

== Notes ==
- history.army.mil
