= John W. Heavey =

United States Army general

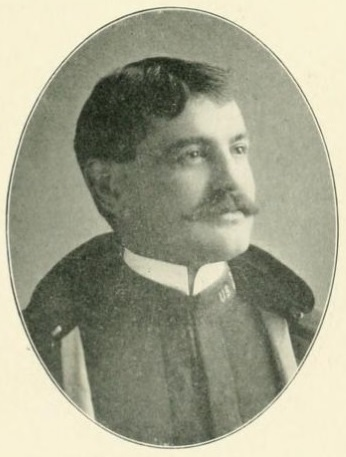
- Heavey as a captain during the Spanish–American War
- Born: February 19, 1867; Vandalia, Illinois, U.S.
- Died: November 18, 1941 (aged 74); Washington, D.C., U.S.
- Burial place: Arlington National Cemetery
- Military career
- Allegiance: United States of America
- Branch: United States Army
- Service years: 1891–1931
- Rank: Brigadier General
- Service number: 0-326
- Commands: Fort Niagara; Militia Bureau; 20th Infantry Regiment; 33rd Infantry Regiment
- Conflicts: Spanish–American War; Pancho Villa Expedition; World War I

John W. Heavey (February 19, 1867 – November 18, 1941) was a United States Army brigadier general who served as Chief of the National Guard Bureau.

== Early life ==
John William Heavey was born in Vandalia, Illinois on February 19, 1867, and graduated from Vandalia High School in 1884. He graduated 33rd in a class of 65 from the United States Military Academy at West Point, New York, in June 1891, receiving his commission as a Second Lieutenant of Infantry. Heavey served with the 5th Infantry Regiment in several southern states and New York between 1891 and 1898.

A member of one of West Point's earliest football teams, Heavey was the right guard on Army's offensive line during the first Army–Navy Game in 1890.

== Spanish–American War ==
In 1898 Heavey joined the 11th Infantry for the Spanish–American War, serving in Puerto Rico, including battles at Hormigueros and Las Marias and assignment as commander of the post at Mayaguez. He remained on duty in Puerto Rico until 1902, when he was assigned to the Philippines, including a posting to Camp Jossman and action against the Moros on Mindanao and Jolo.

== Post-Spanish–American War ==
In 1904 Heavey was assigned to Fort D. A. Russell, Wyoming. He served there until 1905, when he went to the University of Wyoming as Professor of Military Science.

In 1908 Heavey was assigned to duty in Cuba with the 11th Infantry, remaining until 1911 when he was promoted to major and carried out assignments at Fort D. A. Russell and Fort Sam Houston.

Heavey graduated from the United States Army Command and General Staff College at Fort Leavenworth in 1912 and the United States Army War College in 1913.

From 1913 to 1914 Heavey was assigned as regular Army advisor to the Massachusetts National Guard, and from 1914 to 1916 he was a member of the staff at the Militia Bureau.

In 1916 Heavey served on the Mexican border with the 9th Infantry during the Pancho Villa Expedition. Now a lieutenant colonel, he was then assigned to Fort Niagara as the commander and senior instructor for the Officer Training School.

== World War I ==
During World War I Heavey received temporary promotions to colonel and brigadier general and served as executive officer of the Militia Bureau. From August, 1918 to February, 1919 he served as acting Chief of the Militia Bureau when incumbent Jesse McI. Carter was assigned to command the 11th Infantry Division.

Heavey's World War I duties included responsibility for National Guard soldiers assigned to guard utilities and railroads within the United States to protect them from sabotage.

== Post World War I ==
Heavey remained as executive officer of the Militia Bureau until 1922, reverting to the permanent rank of colonel. He was then assigned to the office of the Army Chief of Staff. From 1923 to 1926 he served at Fort Clayton, Panama Canal Zone and successively commanded the 20th and 33rd Infantry Regiments.

From 1926 until retiring in 1931 Heavey was an area coordinator for the Bureau of the Budget, assigned to Philadelphia, Pennsylvania.

== Retirement and death ==
In retirement Heavey resided in Washington, D.C., where he died on November 18, 1941. He was buried at Arlington National Cemetery, Section 2, Site 3513.

== Family ==
In 1894, Heavey married Julia Baggett (1871–1906). They had three sons: William Francis Heavey (West Point, 1917), Thomas Jackson Heavey (West Point, 1917, second class), and Wade Hampton Heavey (West Point, 1923). In 1915, Heavey married Katherine Theresa Sullivan (1868–1943).

William F. Heavey (1896–1974) retired as a brigadier general and was the author of 1947's Down Ramp! The Story of the Army Amphibian Engineers.

Thomas J. Heavey (1897–1951) served in the China Burma India Theater during World War II and retired as a colonel.

Wade H. Heavey (1902–1961) was Assistant Comptroller of the Army and retired as a colonel.

Military offices
Preceded by Jesse McI. Carter	Chief of the National Guard Bureau; 1918	Succeeded by Jesse McI. Carter
