= 13th Infantry Regiment (United States) =

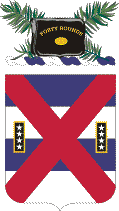
- Coat of arms
- Active: 1861–1940; 1940–1945; 1949–1962; 1963–1984; 1987–present
- Country: United States
- Branch: United States Army
- Type: Regiment
- Part of: 193rd Infantry Brigade
- Nickname: "First at Vicksburg" (special designation)
- Motto: Forty Rounds
- Engagements: American Civil War; Siege of Vicksburg; Chattanooga campaign; 1863 Mississippi River campaigns; Tullahoma Campaign; Indian Wars; Battle of the Badlands; Battle of Beaver Creek; Spanish–American War; Battle of Santiago de Cuba; Philippine Insurrection; Battle of Cavite; Battle of San Fabian; Luzon 1899; Luzon 1900; World War II; Normandy landings; Siegfried Line; Battle of the Bulge; Western Allied invasion of Germany

Commanders
- Notable commanders: William Tecumseh Sherman

Insignia
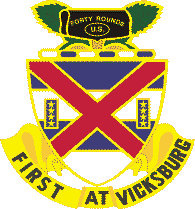
- Distinctive unit insignia

The 13th Infantry Regiment ("First at Vicksburg") is a United States Army infantry regiment whose battalions are currently tasked as basic training battalions.

== History ==
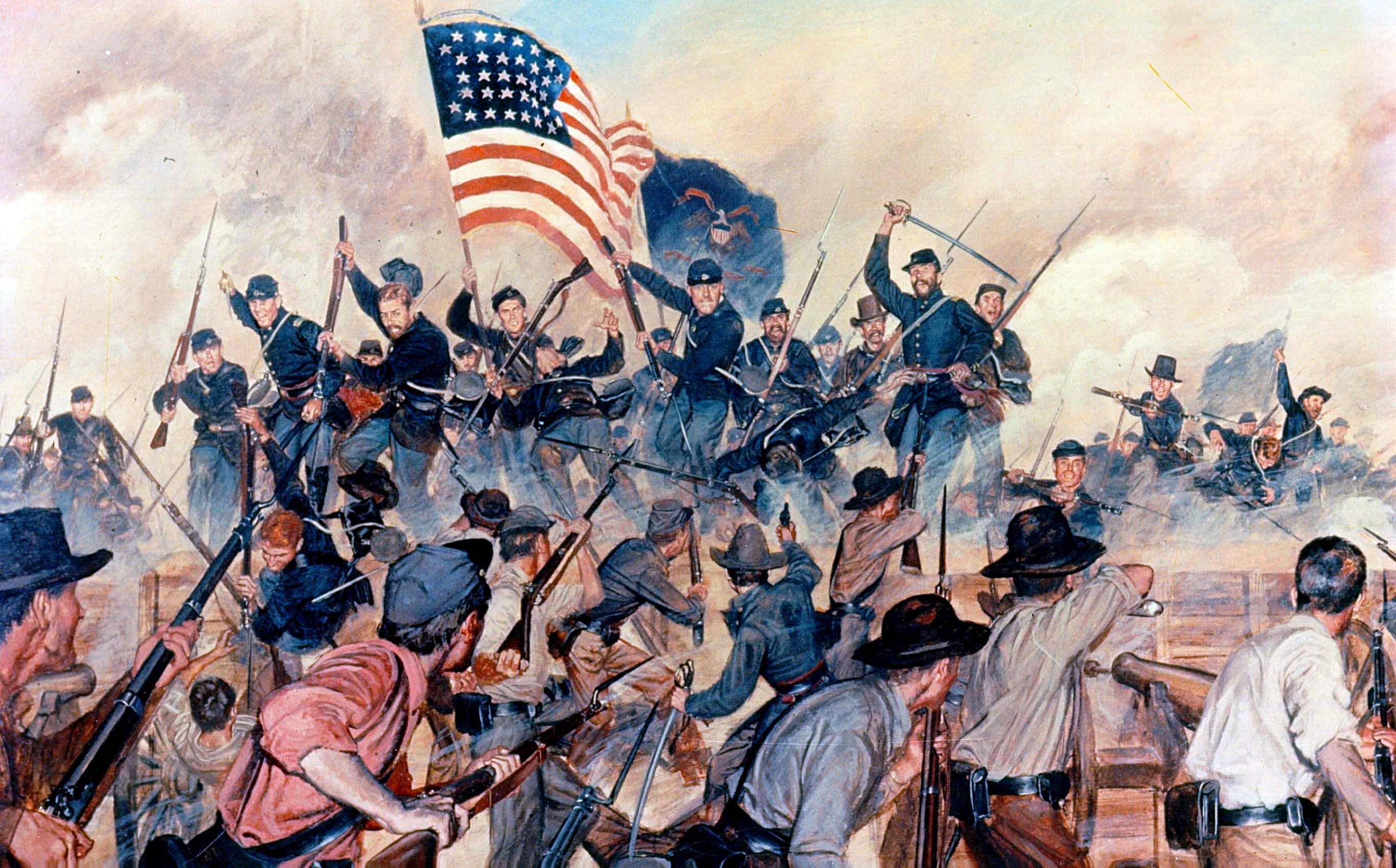
Painting depicting U.S. soldiers from 1st Battalion, 13th Infantry charging Confederate lines at Vicksburg, Mississippi on 19 May 1863, losing 43 percent of their men, but managing to fight its colors up to top. General W.T. Sherman called the performance "unequaled in the Army" and authorized the 13th Infantry to inscribe "First at Vicksburg" on its colors.

During the first post-war expansion of the United States Army following independence, a 13th Regiment of Infantry was formed on 16 July 1798, and was mustered out 11 January 1800. The second 13th Infantry was constituted 11 January 1812. Following the War of 1812 the 13th Infantry was consolidated on 7 May 1815, with the 4th, 9th, 21st, 40th, and 46th Regiments into a new 5th Infantry Regiment whose lineage continues to the present.

=== American Civil War ===
A new, third 13th Infantry Regiment was constituted in May 1861 when the Army expanded the Regular Army during the Civil War. General William Tecumseh Sherman was the colonel of the regiment and Philip Sheridan was one of its captains. It was organized as one of the nine "three-battalion" regiments of regulars, each battalion containing eight companies of infantry, in contrast to the existing ten regular regiments of infantry, which were organized as regiments of a single ten company battalions.

During the Civil War, the unit earned its motto "First at Vicksburg". It participated in the battles of Haynes Bluffs, Champion Hill, Black River, and on 19 May 1863 took part in the assault at Vicksburg. During the battle, the 13th Regiment was the only Union unit to plant its colors on the Confederate positions.

=== Post-Civil War ===
Following the Civil War, the army was reorganized by Congress in July 1866, and the 13th was divided into three regiments, each battalion receiving two additional companies and being organized as traditional single battalion regiments of ten companies. The 1st Battalion retained the designation of the 13th Infantry, while the 2nd Battalion became the 22nd Infantry and the 3rd Battalion the 31st Infantry.

From 1867 to 1871 the regiment fought in the Indian Wars in Montana and North Dakota.

In 1897, the 13th US Infantry was filmed at Fort Jay on Governors Island, New York where they were posted in the years before World War I.

=== Spanish-American War and Philippine Insurrection ===
In June 1898 the regiment was sent to Cuba and led the 1st Infantry's attack on San Juan Hill, capturing the Spanish flag. Major William Auman was the first commanding officer to reach the top of San Juan Hill. The regiment subsequently saw combat in the Philippines during the Philippine–American War.

=== World War I ===
During World War I, the 13th Infantry was assigned to the 8th Division in August 1917. However, the division moved to France in October 1918, too late to see any combat. The regiment was relieved from the 8th Division in January 1919.

=== Interwar period ===
The 13th Infantry was stationed at Camp Merritt, New Jersey, as of June 1919 as a separate regiment. It was transferred on 1 February 1920 to Camp Devens, Massachusetts. It was designated as a training center regiment on 27 July 1921 and assigned to the First Corps Area Training Center. The regiment, less the 2nd and 3rd Battalions, was transferred 22 October 1921 to Fort Andrews, Massachusetts, as a training center unit and the 2nd and 3rd Battalions were inactivated 15 December 1921 at Camp Devens. The 2nd and 3rd Battalions were reactivated at Camp Devens on 10 June 1922 when the regiment was relieved of training center duties and was reorganized into a combat regiment. The regimental headquarters was transferred 2 October 1922 to Fort Warren, Massachusetts, while the subordinate battalions concurrently transferred as follows: 1st Battalion to Fort Strong, Massachusetts; 2nd Battalion to Fort Revere, Massachusetts; and 3rd Battalion to Fort Andrews. The regiment's initial wartime mission in accordance with established war plans was to conduct a mobile defense of possible amphibious landing areas in support of the Harbor Defenses of Boston.

The 13th Infantry Regiment was assigned to the 9th Division on 24 March 1923 when that unit was partially activated. The regimental headquarters was transferred on 18 September 1925 to Fort Andrews. The regiment was relieved from the 9th Division on 15 August 1927 and assigned to the 5th Division. The 3rd Battalion was transferred on 30 August 1928 to Fort Ethan Allen, Vermont, while the regimental headquarters was transferred on 22 September 1928 to Fort Adams, Rhode Island. The 3rd Battalion participated in the inaugural parade of President Herbert Hoover on 4 March 1929. The 1st Battalion was inactivated on 31 October 1929 at Fort Strong. The regimental headquarters was transferred 17 September 1931 to Camp Devens, while the 3rd Battalion transferred 7 October 1931 to Camp Devens. The regiment was relieved from the 5th Division on 1 October 1933 and reassigned to the 9th Division. The regiment sailed with the rest of the 18th Infantry Brigade from the port of Boston 21 October 1939 on the USAT Hunter Liggett to reinforce the Panama Canal Zone, arriving 27 October 1939 at Fort Davis. The regiment was inactivated at Fort Davis on 14 June 1940, relieved from the 9th Division on 22 June 1940, and assigned to the 8th Division, being reactivated on 14 July 1940 at Camp Jackson, South Carolina.

=== World War II ===
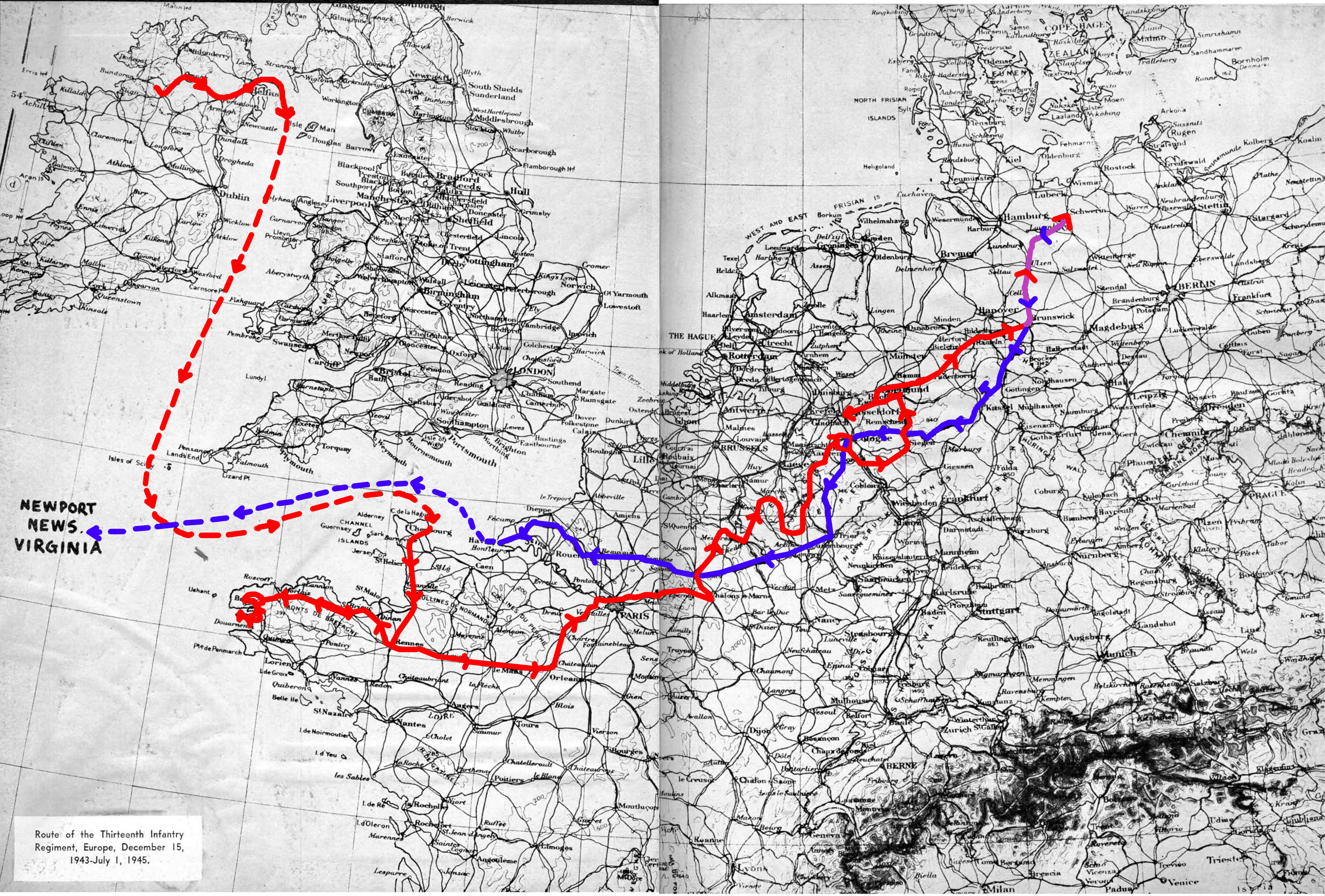
Route of the 13th Infantry Regiment in Europe from December 15, 1943 to July 1, 1945

During World War II, the regiment was reassigned to the 8th Division.

The regiment found itself fighting through the hedgerows of France beginning in July 1944, and led the drive to the Ay River. The regiment spent ten months in combat in Normandy, Northern France, The Rhineland and Central Europe. It occupied a position on the Siegfried Line and was involved in the Battle for Brest and the Battle of Hurtgen Forest. Privates First Class Ernest W. Prussman and Walter C. Wetzel were both posthumously awarded the Medal of Honor their actions.

=== Cold War ===
Following World War II the unit was inactivated at Fort Leonard Wood, Missouri on 18 November 1945. On 17 August 1949 the regiment was activated once again at Fort Jackson, South Carolina as part of the 8th Infantry Division where it remained until 1 August 1954. The 8th Infantry Division was transferred to Fort Carson, Colorado and the 13th went with it where it resumed its training mission. In 1955 the 8th ID was designated an Operation Gyroscope division and as part of the division the 13th completed its last training cycle in December, 1955. In January the regiment began to get permanent party personnel and new recruits, Basic training for these recruits began in mid February and segued immediately into advanced training. Both training blocks were completed by mid June and the regiment achieved "combat ready" status. The regiment under the command of Ellis W. Williamson left Fort Carson for its new assignment in Germany where it replaced the 47th Infantry Regiment, 9th Infantry Division. Regimental headquarters and the 3rd Battalion were stationed at Wiley Barracks in Neu Ulm.

In August 1957 the regiment was reorganised under the Pentomic system as the 1st Battle Group, 13th Infantry Regiment and the old guidons (for A through M companies) were retired and new ones for the 1st Battle Group were issued. In January, 1958 the 1st Battle Group, 13th Infantry Regiment moved from Neu Ulm to Sandhofen. The First Battalion was posted to Baumholder whilst the Second Battalion was posted to Mannheim and remained there until 1 August 1988 when it was inactivated and relieved from assignment to the 8th Infantry Division.

On 27 February 1989, the 13th Infantry Regiment was transferred to the United States Army Training and Doctrine Command and reorganized at Fort Jackson, South Carolina.

Currently, the 1st, 2nd, and 3rd Battalions of the 13th Infantry Regiment, as part of the 193d Infantry Brigade, conduct Basic Combat Training at Fort Jackson, South Carolina.

== Forty Rounds ==
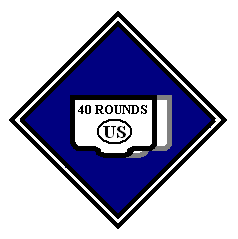
The ACW-era US XV Corps badge

The regiment's motto started as a greeting by members of the unit during the American Civil War. A soldier of the 13th Regiment was asked what his Corps badge was. The Union Army XV Corps did not have a badge at this point yet, so the soldier replied by tapping his cartridge box saying "Forty rounds in the cartridge box and twenty in the pocket!". Later, the story came to the attention of General John A. Logan, who ordered a cartridge box with the lettering "40 rounds" to be used in the Corps insigna.

== See also ==
- List of United States Regular Army Civil War units
