= USS Mann =

USS Mann or USNS Mann may refer to various United States Navy ships, including:

- USS Charles Mann (SP-522), a tug and patrol vessel in commission from 1917 to 1919
- USS General W. A. Mann (AP-112), a troop transport in commission from 1943 to 1965
- USNS Private Joe E. Mann (T-AK-253), a cargo ship in non-commissioned service with the Military Sea Transportation Service from 1950 to 1958
