= Florida State University-Panama =

Coordinates: 9°00′19″N 79°35′22″W

Florida State University-Panama, or FSU-Panama is an international branch campus of Florida State University located on the isthmus of Panama. FSU has operating a broad curriculum program in Panama City of the Republic of Panama for over 50 years. The campus, located by the Miraflores Locks of the Panama Canal, provides students with many facilities, including the largest English-language library in the Republic of Panama, computer facilities, research facilities, student housing, and athletic facilities. The student population is generally international and comes from the United States, the Republic of Panama and other countries.

== History ==
The first campus was established in 1957 and served as an academic institution where U.S. military and Zonians located in the Panama Canal Zone could continue their education while staying in Panama.

In the 1990s, the university was located in the Albrook 808 Building in a former U.S. Army Air Force station. Courses on international affairs, computer science, psychology, and economics were given. Most of the students were U.S. citizens or relatives. After Albrook was reverted to the Panamanian state, FSU moved to the Chino Panameno School, giving classes at night for people who worked from 1997 to 1999.

The campus had various locations in Panama City, but was for many years located in La Boca (The Mouth), near the mouth of the Pacific entrance to the Panama Canal.

In summer 2009, the campus relocated to the Ciudad del Saber or the City of Knowledge, a reverted area which was previously a U.S. Army base, Fort Clayton, but was closed in 1999 per the Torrijos–Carter Treaties.

In fall 2013, the satellite campus began offering a master's degree in International Affairs.

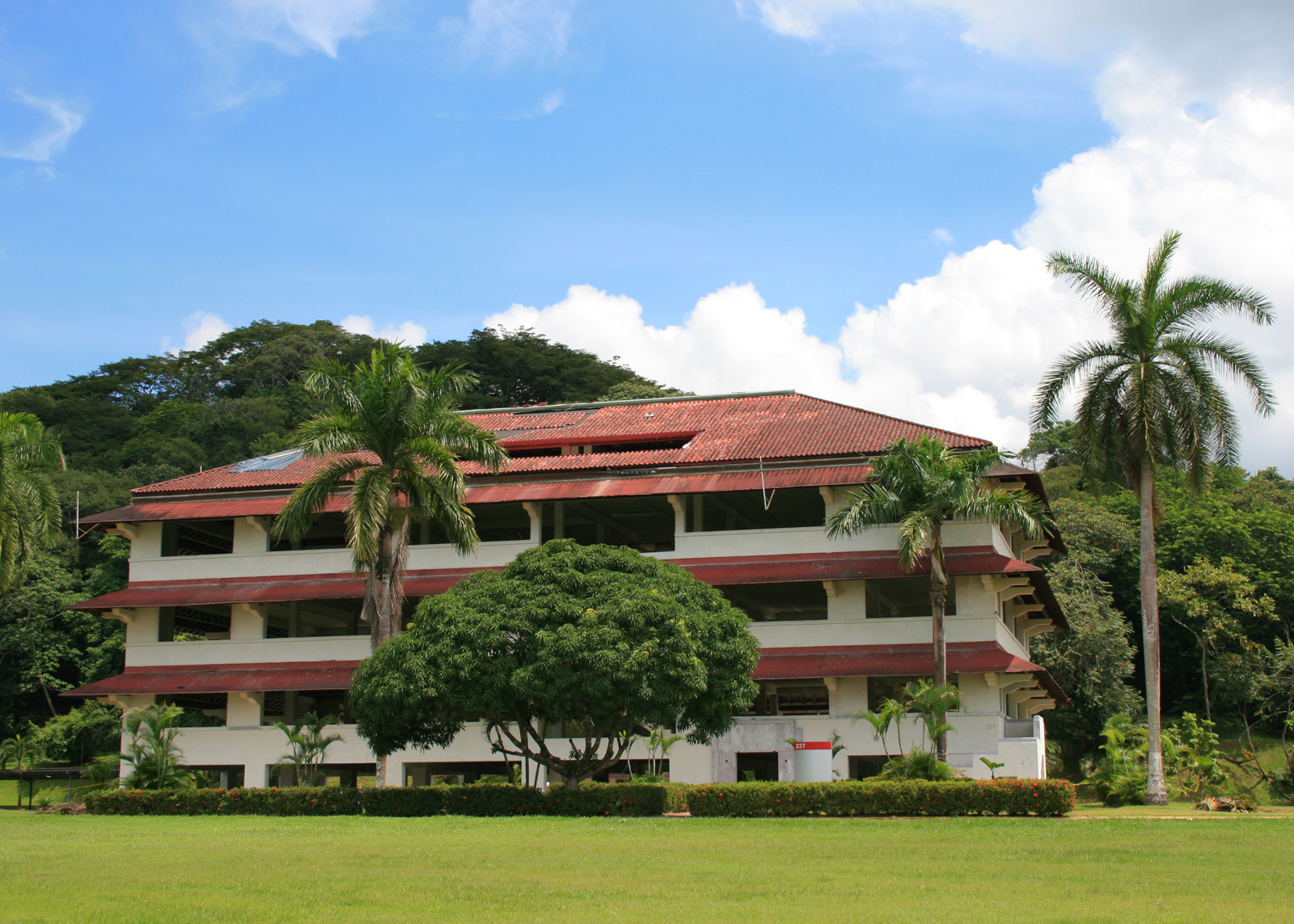
FSU-Panama's new building before rehabilitation in the Ciudad del Saber. July 2008.

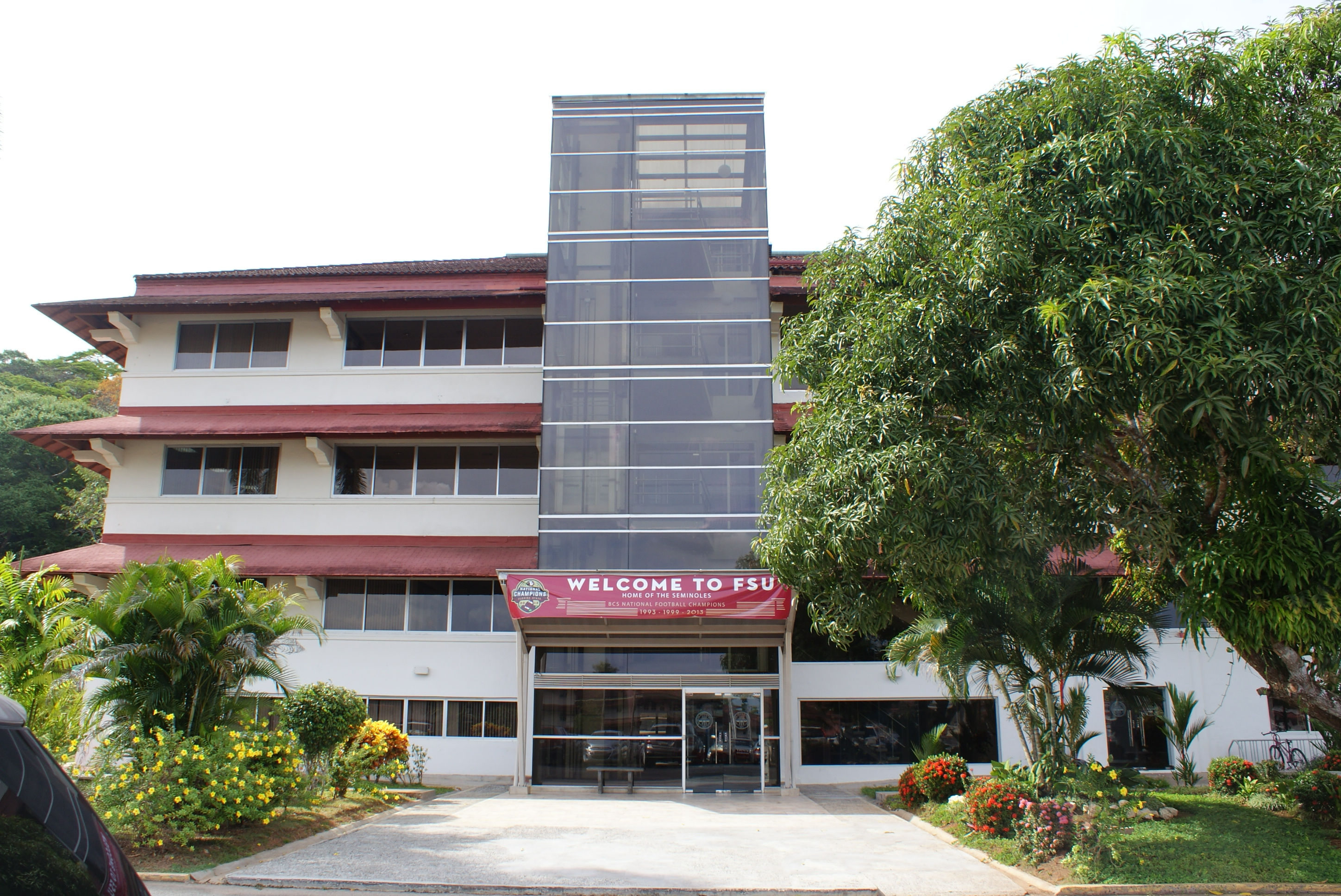
The new campus in 2014.

== Study Abroad Program ==
Many students take part in FSU's "2+2" program, whereby after completing two years of study at FSU Panama, they can receive in-state tuition at the main campus in Tallahassee.

There are a few degrees which can be completed fully at FSU Panama:

- Computer Science
- Environmental Studies
- Information Studies
- International Affairs
- Latin American and Caribbean Studies

These programs are accredited by the Southern Association of Colleges and Schools (SACS).

== Facilities ==
- Largest English-language library in the Republic of Panama
- Computer Labs
- Chemistry and Physics Labs
- Student housing
- Athletic facilities
  - One mile track
  - Gym
  - Basketball court
  - Tennis courts
  - Baseball diamonds
  - Olympic sized pool

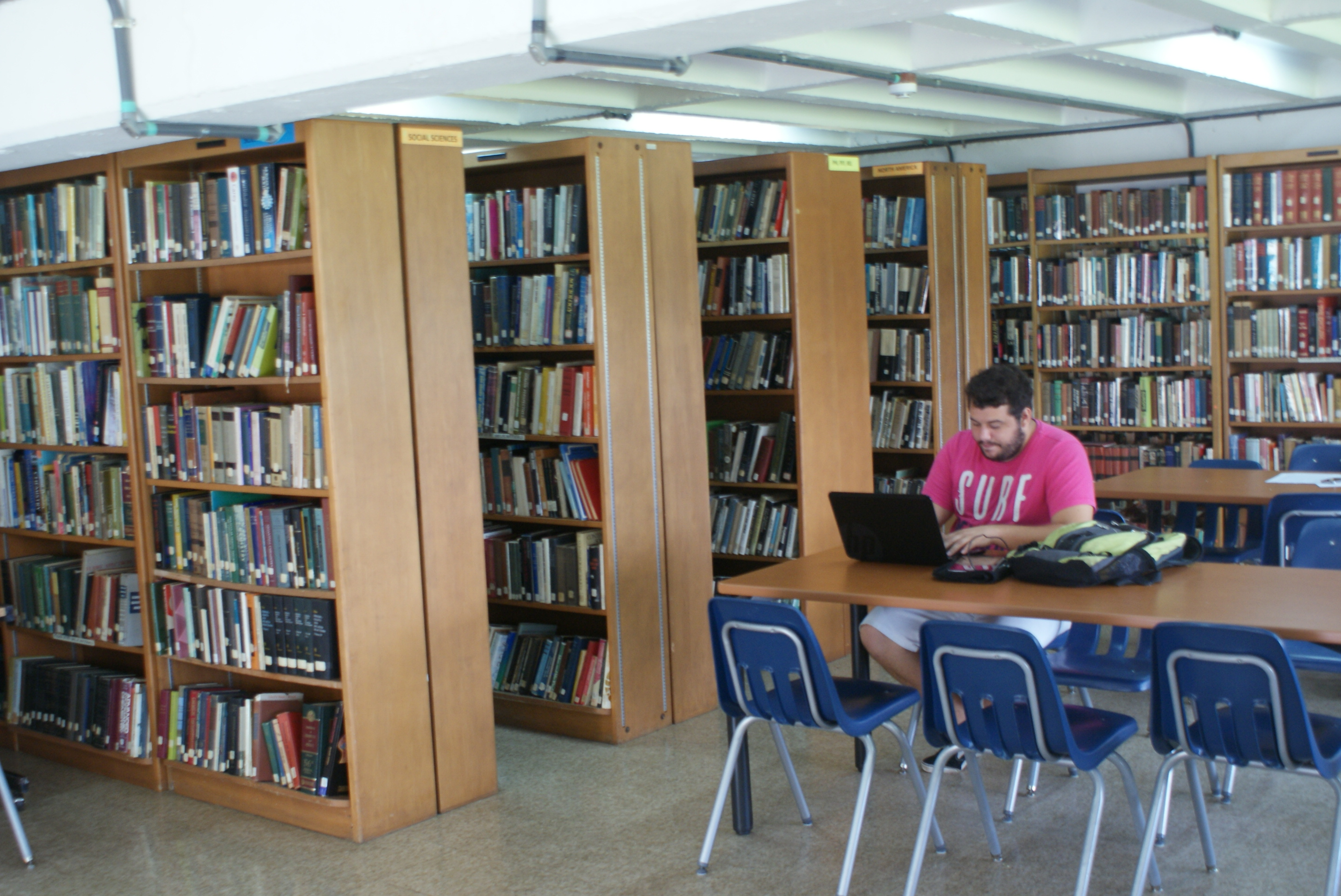
The library at FSU-Panama contains the largest collection of English-language books in the country.

== Student organizations ==
FSU Panama has its own student government association as well as its own student newspaper, the FSU Pananole. There are many other clubs and groups, such as the Mandarin Club and the Environmental Club.

== Sports ==
- 2004 National Football Championship of Panama, FSU-Panama vs USMA
- 2007 National Football Championship of Panama, FSU-Panama vs Panama Saints
