= Balboa Academy =

Coordinates: 9.00080°N 79.58294°W

- Ciudad del Saber, Panama City, Panama

Information
- Established: 1999

Balboa Academy is an international, coeducational, college-preparatory school that offers a US curriculum education for Pre-kindergarten through the 12th grade. The language of instruction is English.

Balboa Academy was established in Ciudad del Saber, Panama City, Panama, in August 1999 by a team of educators. Balboa Academy students represent a diversity of economic, social, and cultural backgrounds.

In December 2020, Balboa Academy became part of Inspired Education Group. Inspired schools remain anchored in the cultures of their respective locations, and collectively, they form an international community that nurtures each student's academic and personal development in a progressive, dynamic, and innovative learning environment.

== See also ==
- List of international schools
