= Fort Sherman =

Former US Army base in Panama

Coordinates: 9.36302°N 79.953035°W

Ft. Sherman, Panama in 1986

Fort Sherman is a former United States Army base in Panama, located on Toro Point at the Caribbean (northern) end of the Panama Canal, on the western bank of the Canal directly opposite Colón (which is on the eastern bank). It was the primary defensive base for the Caribbean sector of the Canal from 1914–1945, and was also the U.S. Army Caribbean's Jungle Warfare Training Center (JWTC) from 1951–1999. Its Pacific-side partner was Fort Amador. Both bases were turned over to Panama in 1999. The base was transferred to the Panamanian defense forces in 1999 and renamed as Base Aeronaval Cristóbal Colón.

== History ==
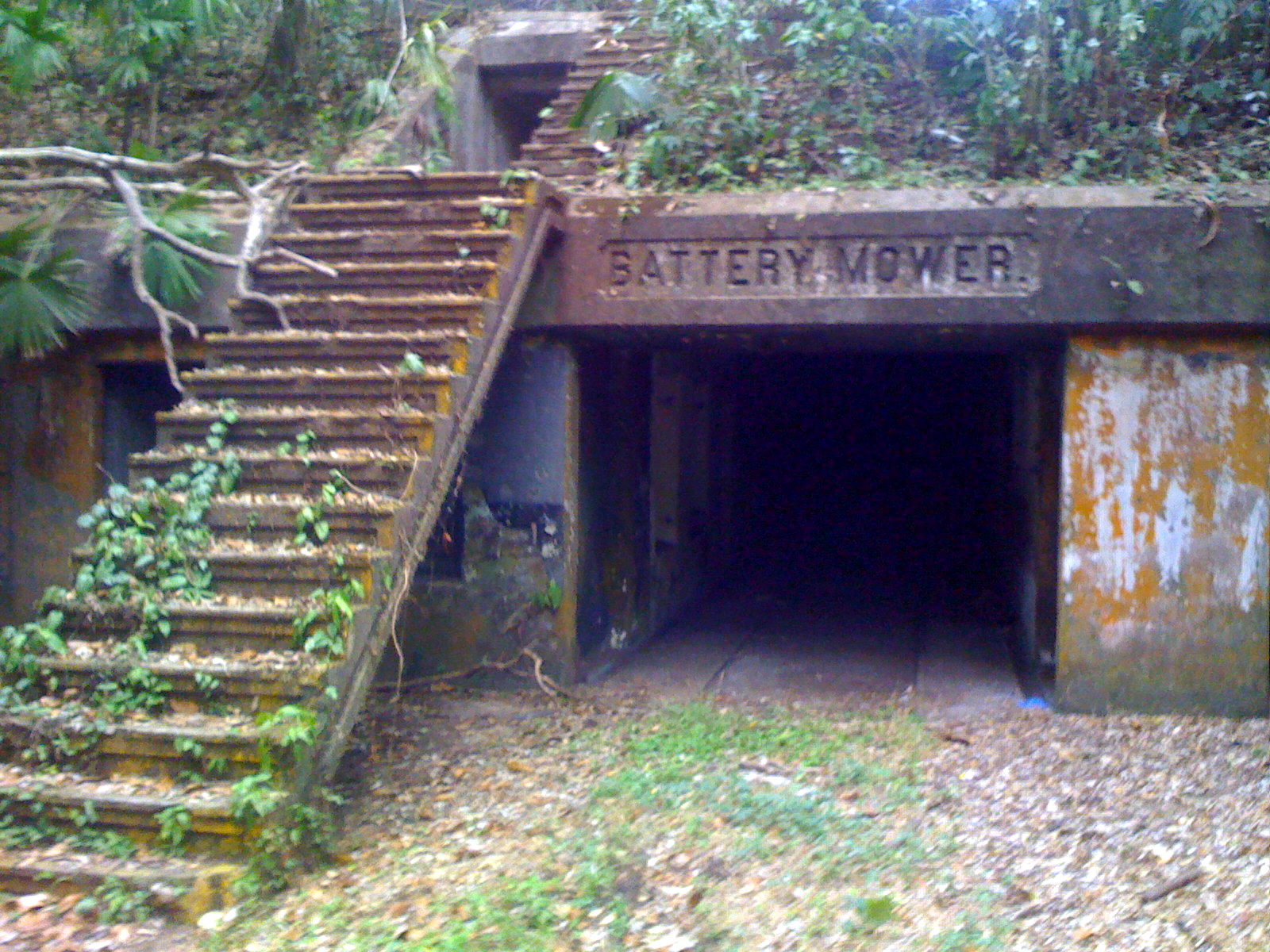
Ruins of Coastal Defence Artillery, Battery Mower, at Ft. Sherman

Ft. Sherman Dock, Panama in 2008, now Shelter Bay Marina

Concurrent with the Canal construction a number of defensive locations were developed to protect it, both with coastal defense guns, as well as military bases to defend against a direct infantry assault. Fort Sherman was the primary Caribbean-side infantry base, while Fort Amador protected the Pacific side. Construction of Fort Sherman began in January 1912 as a phase of the original 1910 defensive plans. Fort Sherman was named by War Department General Order No. 153 dated November 24, 1911, in honor of General William Tecumseh Sherman.

The Fort included 23,100 acres (93 km^{2}) of land, about half of which was covered by jungle. The developed areas included housing, barracks for 300, a small airstrip and various recreational areas. Sherman was the site of the US's first operationally deployed early warning radar when an SCR-270 was installed there in 1941.

== Batteries ==
The fort contained the following batteries that were in use as late as 1943

- Battery Baird four 12-inch (305 mm) Model 1896 mortars
- Battery Howard four 12-inch (305 mm) Model 1896 mortars
- Battery Stanley 14-inch (355 mm) disappearing carriage DC Model 1910
- Battery Mower 14-inch (355 mm) disappearing carriage DC Model 1910
- Battery Kilpatrick two 6-inch (152 mm) disappearing carriage Model 1908
- Battery Sedgwick Pratt two 12-inch (305 mm) M1895 barbettes
- Battery Alexander Mackenzie two 12-inch (305 mm) M1895 barbettes

During WW1 supplemental shore batteries were added on or near Fort Sherman using field pieces.

- Four 155-mm guns
- Four 75-mm guns

== Modern use ==
After the decommissioning of the U.S. Army Coast Artillery Corps, the forested area was used by the United States Army South (USARSO) Jungle Operations Training Center (JOTC). JOTC was established in 1951 to train both US and allied Central American forces in jungle warfare, about 9,000 soldiers completed the course each year. The JOTC also taught a ten-day intra-service Air Crew Survival Course of service and a four-week Engineer Jungle Warfare Course (EJWC). Upon completion of the course the Jungle Expert Patch was awarded. During the Vietnam War, the JOTC was an important part of training for troops headed to that conflict. The troops nicknamed it "The Green Hell."

Starting in 1962, elements of the 193rd Infantry Brigade would support and use Fort Sherman both for the JOTC and to launch HAWK missiles.

Beginning in 1976, Sherman was the home of the US Army's Non-Commissioned Officer Academy in Panama, hosting both the Basic NCO Course and the Primary NCO Course.

In December of 1989, the Jungle Operations Training Battalion (JOTB) was given the mission to secure 27 towns in the area around Fort Sherman as part of the larger Operation Just Cause.

After the closure of the Fort Sherman on April 1, 1999, JOTC moved its location to Hawaii.

== Base Aeronaval Cristóbal Colón ==
After Fort Sherman closed, the base was transferred to Panama and has been used as a naval station and jungle warfare school.

On January 27, 2026 the Army Security Cooperation Group–South (ASCG-S) took command of the Combined Jungle Operations Training Center (CJOTC) in Panama. The Army is looking to renew and update the JOTC jungle warfare course at Base Aeronaval Cristóbal Colón with their partners in Panama. Currently the course is 18 days long with a focus on fire and shelter building, tracking and patrol based exercises. The Army felt the course in Hawaii was too easy and did not reflect the humidity and terrain to be found in Latin America. Additionally, Panama is considered a much easier location to train groups of soldiers quicker and closer than Hawaii or the Marine's jungle warfare course in Okinawa. The first group of soldiers began the new course in February 2026. Soldiers who complete the course will receive the Jungle Warfare Tab.

== In popular culture ==
Fort Sherman was used in the filming of the 2008 James Bond film Quantum of Solace.

== See also ==
- List of former United States military installations in Panama
