= Jesse McI. Carter =

United States Army general

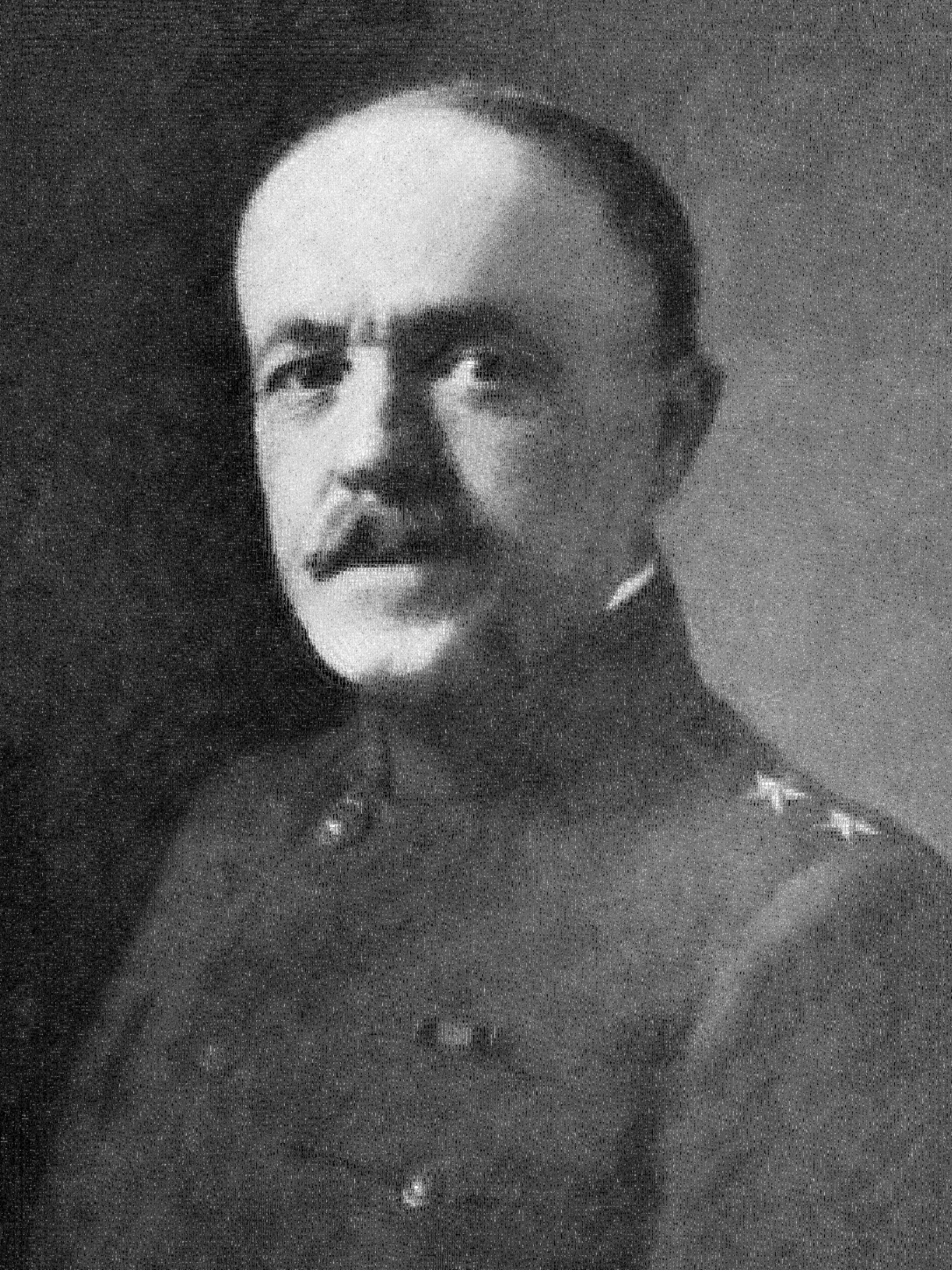
- Major General Jesse McIlvaine Carter
- Born: April 12, 1863; Farmington, Missouri, U.S.
- Died: June 23, 1930 (aged 67); Houston, Texas, U.S.
- Burial place: Farmington, Missouri
- Military career
- Allegiance: United States
- Branch: United States Army
- Service years: 1886–1921
- Rank: Major General
- Commands: 12th Cavalry Regiment; 11th Infantry Division; Chief of the Militia Bureau
- Conflicts: Indian Wars; Spanish–American War; Pancho Villa Expedition; World War I
- Awards: Army Distinguished Service Medal

Jesse McIlvane Carter (April 12, 1863 – June 23, 1930) was a United States Army Major General who served as Chief of the Militia Bureau.

== Early life ==
Jesse McI. Carter was born in Farmington, Missouri on April 12, 1863. He attended the United States Military Academy (USMA) at West Point, New York, from where he later graduated (37th in a class of 77) in June 1886, the same year as fellow Missourian John J. Pershing, who graduated 30th. Carter was appointed a second lieutenant in the 3rd Cavalry.

== Start of career ==
Carter served in a variety of assignments throughout the United States at the beginning of his career, including postings during the Indian Wars to Fort Ringgold, Texas with the 3rd Cavalry, and Forts McIntosh, Clark and Sam Houston, Texas with the 5th Cavalry. From 1890 to 1891 he was commandant of cadets and an instructor at Norwich University. From 1893 to 1894 he served as a recruiting officer in Indianapolis, Indiana and Louisville, Kentucky. In the years immediately prior to the Spanish–American War, Carter commanded Troop C, 5th Cavalry at New Orleans, Tampa, Mobile and Huntsville.

== Spanish–American War ==
In 1898 Carter was appointed mustering officer for Georgia and Tennessee, responsible for recruiting and swearing in officers for the volunteer units formed to fight the Spanish–American War.

In 1900 he was appointed a captain in the Porto Rico Regiment, a volunteer organization raised shortly after the end of the war.

== Post Spanish–American War ==
Carter was appointed a captain in the 14th Cavalry in 1901. He served at Forts Leavenworth and Logan, in the Philippines, and at Walla Walla, Washington until 1909.

In 1909 Carter began two years of service on the Army General Staff. He was promoted to major in 1911.

From 1912 to 1914 Carter served as a member of the Cavalry Board, the committee charged with reviewing tactics, weapons and equipment, and making recommendations for improvement.

In 1914 Carter was again assigned to the 3rd Cavalry, serving on the Mexican Border in Texas during unrest caused by the Mexican Revolution.

== Pancho Villa Expedition ==
Carter served as a squadron commander with the 12th Cavalry in Panama in 1916. Later that year he was promoted to colonel and commanded the 12th Cavalry on the Texas–Mexico Border during the Pancho Villa Expedition.

== World War I ==
In 1917 Carter was appointed to head the Militia Bureau, the forerunner of the modern National Guard Bureau. He served until mid-1918, helping federalize and mobilize National Guard units for World War I. He was promoted to brigadier general in 1917 and temporary major general later that year.

In August, 1918 Carter was appointed commander of the 11th Infantry Division, at Fort Meade, Maryland, and began training in anticipation of front line service in France. The Armistice took place before training was complete, and the division did not leave the United States.

Carter received the Distinguished Service Medal in recognition of his World War I service. The citation for the medal reads:

The President of the United States of America, authorized by Act of Congress, July 9, 1918, takes pleasure in presenting the Army Distinguished Service Medal to Major General Jesse McIlvaine Carter, United States Army, for exceptionally meritorious and distinguished services to the Government of the United States, in a duty of great responsibility during World War I. As Chief of the Militia Bureau, General Carter conceived and directed the organization of the United States Guards and utilized these and other forces most effectively in the important work of safeguarding the utilities and industries of the Nation essential to the prosecution of the war.

== Post World War I ==
Carter reverted to his permanent rank of brigadier general after the war, and returned to the Militia Bureau. Until his retirement he advocated for reforms to the National Guard, including a plan to have state Adjutants General be appointed from among officers of the regular Army. He also planned for the National Guard's post-war reorganization and reequipping, taking steps to standardize training and other requirements in order to align them with the regular Army.

Carter retired in 1921, and resided in Wharton, Texas.

== Retirement and death ==
After retiring from the Army, Carter was employed by St. Louis's Missouri-Lincoln Trust Company as manager of its Texas holdings. He later worked as a manager for the Wharton Development Company.

Carter died in Houston, Texas on June 23, 1930, as the result of complications after surgery for appendicitis. He was buried in Farmington.

Congress subsequently passed a special act making Carter a permanent major general on the retired list, to date from June 21, 1930.

Military offices
Preceded by William Abram Mann	Chief of the National Guard Bureau; 1917–1918	Succeeded by John W. Heavey
Preceded by John W. Heavey	Chief of the National Guard Bureau; 1918–1921	Succeeded by George C. Rickards
