= 193rd Infantry Brigade (United States) =

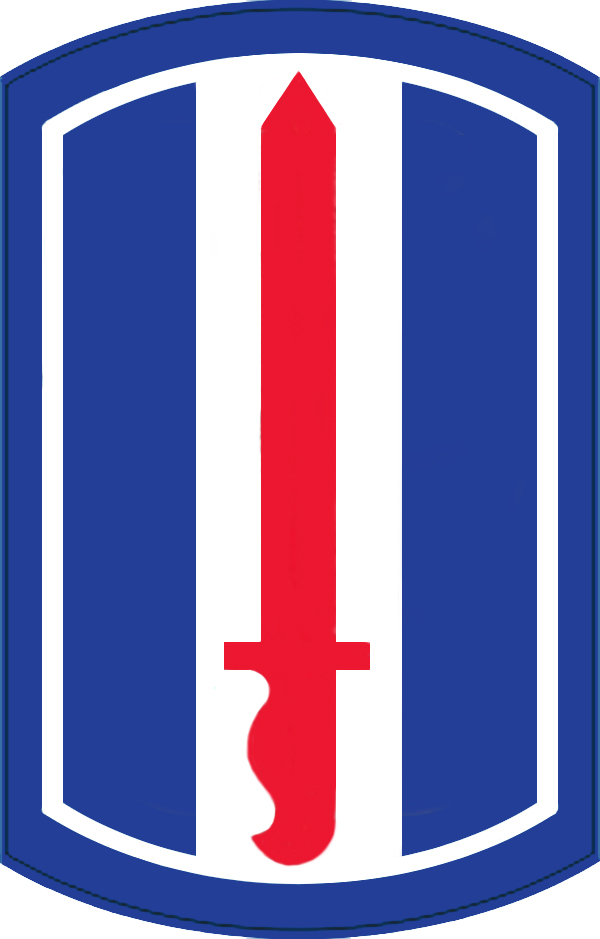
- Shoulder sleeve insignia
- Active: 24 June 1921–31 March 1946 (various designations); 25 March 1948–9 July 1952 (97th Mech. Cav. Recon. Troop); 15 July 1962–14 October 1994 (193rd Infantry Bge.); 31 January 2007–present (193rd Infantry Bge. - Training)
- Country: United States
- Branch: United States Army
- Role: Training
- Size: Brigade
- Part of: United States Army Training Center
- Garrison/HQ: Fort Jackson, South Carolina
- Motto: "No Ground to Give"
- March: Pathfinder of Panama, by John Philip Sousa
- Engagements: World War II; Central Europe; Armed Forces Expeditionary Force; Operation Just Cause

Commanders
- Current commander: Col. Timothy Meadors
- Command Sergeant Major: CSM William P. Clancy II

Insignia
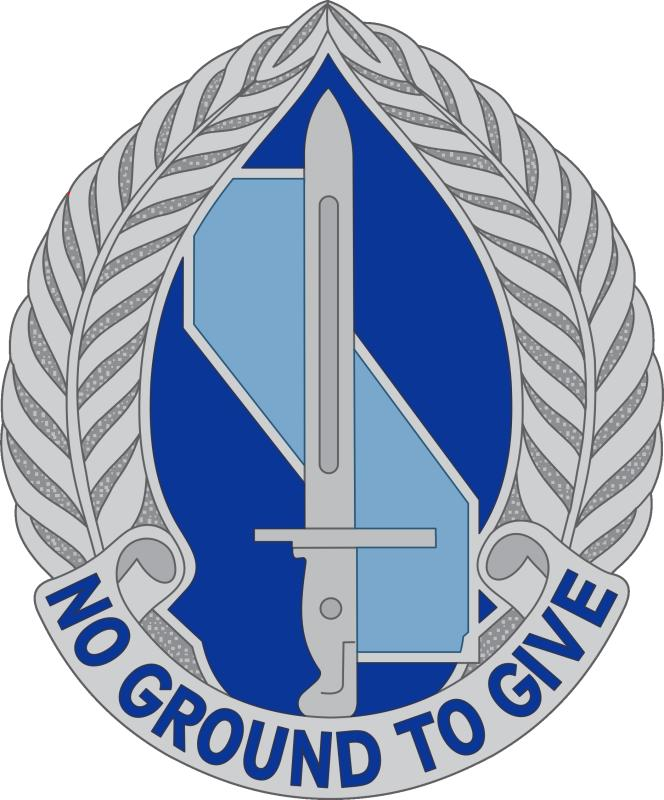
- Distinctive unit insignia

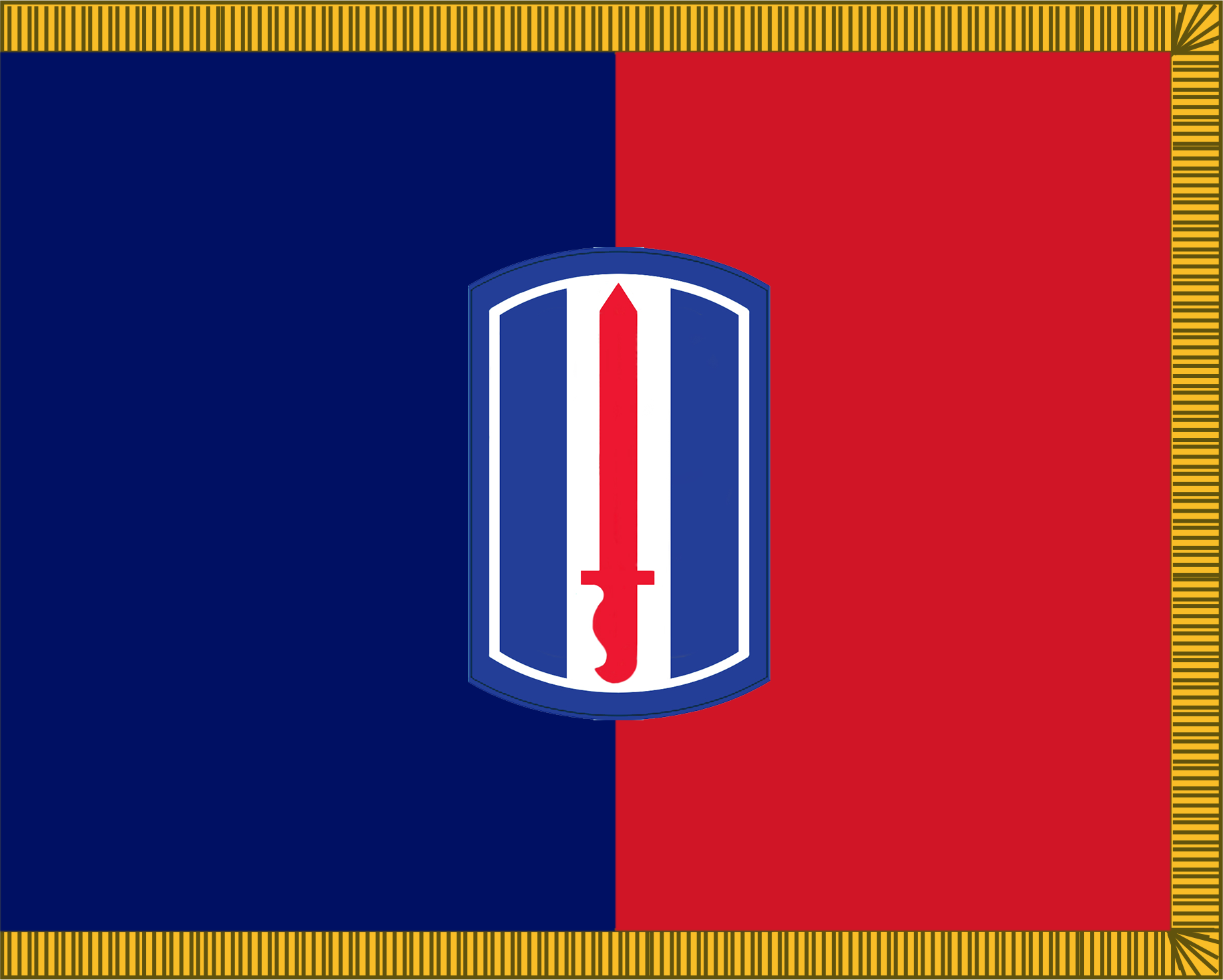
- 193rd Infantry Brigade Flag

The 193rd Infantry Brigade is a United States Army infantry brigade. It was originally constituted in the Organized Reserve on 24 June 1922 as Headquarters and Headquarters Company, 193rd Infantry Brigade and assigned to the 97th Division. The brigade was converted and redesignated in February 1942 as the 97th Reconnaissance Troop, 97th Division. In February 1943, the Troop was ordered into active military service and organized at Camp Swift, Texas. It was reorganized and redesignated in October 1945 as the 97th Mechanized Cavalry Reconnaissance Troop.

== World War II ==
The 97th Reconnaissance Troop landed at Le Havre, France, 2 March 1945 as part of the 97th Infantry Division. The Division crossed the German border west of Aachen and took up a defensive position along the west bank of the Rhine River opposite Düsseldorf, engaging in patrolling. The division then entered the battle of the Ruhr pocket, crossing the Rhine near Bonn and taking up a position on the southern bank of the Siege River. It crossed that river against light resistance and fought a street-to-street engagement in Siegburg. Pushing on toward Düsseldorf through difficult terrain and heavy resistance in densely wooded areas, the Division captured Solingen. Düsseldorf fell on the next day and the Ruhr pocket was eliminated. 97th Reconnaissance Troop played a vital role in the Ruhr campaign. Besides its customary reconnaissance and patrolling duties, the unit once was charged with protecting the entire left flank of the division.

Moving to protect the left flank of the Third Army on its southern drive, the 97th Division took Cheb, Czechoslovakia and attacked the Czechoslovak pocket near Weiden, Germany. It had advanced to Konstantinovy Lázně, Czechoslovakia, when it received the cease-fire order on 7 May 1945. The Division left for Le Havre, 16 June 1945, for redeployment to the Pacific, arriving at Cebu, Philippines, 16 September, and then sailed to Japan for occupation duty, arriving at Yokohama 23 September.

97th Mechanized Reconnaissance Troop inactivated March 1946 in Japan. (Organized Reserves redesignated 25 March 1948 as the Organized Reserve Corps; redesignated 9 July 1952 as the Army Reserve.) Converted and redesignated July 1962 as Headquarters and Headquarters Company, 193rd Infantry Brigade and relieved from assignment to the 97th Infantry Division.

== Panama ==
In 1961, after the abortive Bay of Pigs Invasion and rumors of Soviet assistance to Cuba, Secretary of Defense Robert McNamara decided to bolster available U.S. Army forces in the Caribbean area. The Army replaced the battle group in the Panama Canal Zone with the 193d Infantry Brigade, which was activated on 8 August 1962.

Through most of the period of its assignment to the Canal Zone, the 193d included the following units:

- 3d Battalion, 5th Infantry (Instead of the regiment's common nickname, the "Bobcats," 3rd Battalion retained the name and motto, "Red Devils," when reflagged from 3d Battalion (Airborne), 508th Infantry, Fort Kobbe) in Mid 1968. At that time only A Company was retained as a Full Jump Status unit, A Company (Abn) 3rd Battalion 5th Infantry.
- 4th Battalion, 10th Infantry ("Apaches," Fort Davis)
- 4th Battalion, 20th Infantry ("Sykes Regulars," Fort Clayton)
- Battery B, 22d Field Artillery (Fort Kobbe; later reflagged as Battery D, 320th FA)
- 518th Engineer Company (Fort Kobbe, later reflagged as the 59th Engineer Company)
- 534th MP Company (Fort Clayton)
- 227th Military Police Company (Ft. Clayton)
- 549th Military Police Company (Fort Gulick)
- 210th Aviation Battalion (Albrook Army Air Field; moved during the 1970s to Fort Kobbe as part of the Canal reorganization treaties)
- 1097th Transportation Company (Medium Boat) (Fort Davis)

Additionally, there were other units, such as the School of the Americas (Fort Gulick), 3d Battalion, 7th Special Forces (Fort Gulick), and Jungle Operations Training Center (Fort Sherman) that were not assigned to the 193d but had an habitual relationship and rating scheme for their commanders and/or senior officers tantamount to assignment.

There were other units assigned at different times. For example, the brigade had, for most of the 1960s a mixed HAWK missile and M42 Duster battalion, 4th Battalion, 517th Artillery (Battery A at Fort Davis, Dusters; Battery B, Fort Clayton, Dusters; Battery C, HAWKs, Flamenco Island; and Battery D, HAWK, Fort Sherman). In the late 1970s General William R. Richardson planned to convert the non-airborne companies to the 3d Battalion, 5th Infantry into air assault units. His early departure halted the change.The brigade was also staffed heavily enough as to permit it to command the 92d and 53d Infantry Brigades (Separate) from the Puerto Rico and Florida National Guard, respectively. In 1977, in order to improve command and control over the numerous combat support and combat service support units, the 193d Combat Support Battalion (CSB) was activated within the brigade. The 193d CSB commanded a wide variety of units, to include the 193d Military Intelligence Company (Combat Electronic Warfare and Intelligence - CEWI), the 1097th Transportation Company (Medium Boat), and even a field artillery unit (Battery D, 320th FA).

In October 1983, the 1st and 2d Battalions, 187th Infantry were assigned to the 193d Infantry Brigade in Panama as a result of reflagging the 4th Battalion, 10th Infantry and the 3d Battalion, 5th Infantry, respectively. Company A(Moatengators), 2d Battalion, 187th Infantry was on jump status and later this was expanded to the entire battalion. During a realignment of the United States Army's combat forces in 1987 the colors of the 1st and 2d Battalions were inactivated in Panama and reactivated at Fort Campbell, KY. This resulted in 2-187th being reflagged as the 1st Battalion (Airborne), 508th Infantry while 1-187th was reflagged as the 5th Battalion, 87th Infantry.

Beginning in early 1988, after the first coup attempt against Noriega failed, life for the soldiers and families of the Brigade became increasingly difficult due to civil unrest in Panama City and harassment by the Panama Defense Force. Movements off post were often restricted, armed confrontations occurred frequently and quality of life declined. Panamanian provocations, intended to deny freedom of movement rights that were guaranteed by treaty, steadily escalated. Americans were increasingly detained without charges and held without communication. At one point, several school buses full of dependent children on the way to school were commandeered by the PDF and held for hours. This harassment culminated after the abortive Panamanian elections during the summer of 1989, when all off-post personnel were moved on-post, resulting in families having to double or triple up in on-post quarters.

As part of the fall-out from the aborted Panamanian elections, the Army sent a package of augmentation forces to Panama (Operation NIMROD DANCER)- which included a mechanized battalion from the 5th Infantry Division (Mechanized), based at Fort Polk, Louisiana; this battalion was attached to the Brigade, forming Task Force Bayonet. Later in the fall of 1989, the Brigade instituted an intensive training program to prepare for combat operations, which seemed increasingly likely after the failure of the second coup, in October. In December 1989, two years of diplomatic tension between Panama and the United States came to a head. In a speech to a gathering of his supporters, General Manuel Noriega – the head of the PDF and de facto dictator of Panama – declared that a state of war existed between the United States and Panama. This might well have been dismissed as simply more of his defiant, anti-U.S. rhetoric, were it not for two events that followed within a matter of hours. A U.S. Marine officer was shot and killed at a PDF checkpoint, and then a U.S. Navy officer and his wife in the following car were arrested, taken to the Commandancia and beaten and abused for several hours. In light of this series of events, President George Bush ordered the invasion of Panama, codenamed Operation Just Cause, to protect U.S. lives and property, and to permit the inauguration of the winners of the previous summer's elections.

=== Operation JUST CAUSE ===
The mission of the 193d, tactically organized as Task Force Bayonet, was twofold. The defensive component required the protection of an extensive complex of US military bases, family housing tracts and Panama Canal Commission facilities that stretched over an area of 20 kilometers. This included protection of the vital Miraflores and Pedro Miguel lock complexes. Simultaneously, the Brigade was responsible for an offensive area of operations that encompassed half of Panama City and its 1.1 million inhabitants. Within this area, the Brigade's initial offensive task was to isolate and eliminate all PDF units (police, military and para-military) in the areas Fort Amador, Ancon Hill, Balboa, and Chorrillo. Of primary importance was the Commandancia, which was to be taken in a coup de main. Other objectives within this area included: the PDF's Engineer Battalion compound, that part of Fort Amador occupied by the PDF 5th Company and the Panamanian Army headquarters; the Balboa and Ancon DENI (Panama's National Defense of Investigations) and Balboa Department of Transportation (DNTT) stations.

Although the 193d Infantry Brigade (Light) was, by TO&E, only a small brigade, as a result of various augmentations leading up to JUST CAUSE, in its role as TF Bayonet it ended up being the largest brigade-sized task force in JUST CAUSE. The various units that comprised TF Bayonet on D-Day were:

- 193rd Infantry Brigade (Light)
  - Headquarters & Headquarters Company
  - 1st Battalion, 508th Infantry (Airborne) (previously designated 3-5th, respectively 2-187th)
  - 5th Battalion, 87th Infantry
  - 1st Battalion, 228th Aviation, Fort Kobbe
  - Battery D, 320th Field Artillery
  - 59th Engineer Company (Sapper)
- Augmentation as a result of NIMROD DANCER
  - 4th Battalion, 6th Infantry, from the 5th Infantry Division (Mechanized)
  - One M551 Sheridan platoon from the 3rd Battalion, 73rd Armor, arrived 18 November 1989 from the 82nd Airborne Division
- Augmentation effective on execution of JUST CAUSE
  - 519th MP Battalion, deployed to Panama the week before JUST CAUSE from Fort Meade, Maryland.
    - 209th MP Company
    - 401st MP Company
    - 511th MP Company
    - 555th MP Company
    - 988th MP Company - arrived on 14 December 1989 and was the 1st MP company to receive combat orders since Vietnam
    - 108th MP Company (arrived D+1 as part of the reinforcing airflow)
  - One company, 75th Ranger Regiment, on D-Day for the purpose of clearing the Commandancia.
  - One Marine platoon (LAV-25s) from Task Force Semper Fi

Note that TF Bayonet had neither an organic forward support battalion nor normal combat service support units, as was doctrine at the time. Limited support was provided by the 41st Area Support Group (which had theater-wide responsibilities), but lacking a dedicated Forward Support Battalion, the Brigade's logistical support operations were significantly strained. A fifth maneuver battalion had originally been slated for TF Bayonet, for the purpose of having a two-battalion attack at the Commandancia – which was to be the main attack of JUST CAUSE. However, JTF-SOUTH reallocated this battalion to the other side of the Isthmus. Ironically, as JTF-SOUTH was doing this, Noriega was beefing up defenses at the Commandancia. Half of the PDF 6th Company, most of the PDF 7th Company and elements of the PDF Bn 2000 were moved to the Commandancia in the two months leading up to JUST CAUSE, replacing the unit that had led the second coup attempt.

At 1800 hours, 19 December 1989, TF Bayonet received from JTF-SOUTH the order to execute Operation JUST CAUSE, with an H-Hour of 0100 hours, 20 December. Because the JUST CAUSE OPLAN had been classified at the top secret level, only a small number of the Brigade's leaders were familiar with its contents.

After combat operation ceased, a political decision to rapidly drawdown US forces to their pre-invasion levels had an unexpected impact on the 193d; in order to reach that level, USSOUTHCOM directed that the Brigade's field artillery battery be inactivated and its personnel – and their families – be immediately shipped out of country. During this period TF Bayonet became what is believed to be the largest combat brigade-sized unit in post-WWII history, controlling at one period seven infantry battalions – just two shy of what a full division commanded at the time. It managed this task – over the extreme distances noted above – without the benefit of a dedicated support battalion, and the logistical improvisation required was little short of genius.

Within several more months, the rest of the augmentation forces were withdrawn. The 193d Infantry Brigade however, remained in Panama and continued to provide a military presence. On 14 October 1994 after more than 32 years of providing ground defense for Panama, 193d Infantry Brigade was 'honored' as the first major unit to inactivate in accordance with the Panama Canal Treaty of 1977, treaty implementation plan, which mandated U.S. Forces withdrawal from Panama by December 1999.

== Current mission ==
On 31 January 2007, the 193rd Infantry Brigade was reactivated at Fort Jackson, South Carolina with the mission to conduct basic combat training for new entrants to the Army. It has replaced the 171st Infantry Brigade in this task; however, both the 193rd and 171st (inactivated 10 June 2016) have a headquarters and personnel on post.

- Headquarters & Headquarters Company
- 1st Battalion, 13th Infantry
- 2d Battalion, 13th Infantry
- 3d Battalion, 13th Infantry
- 2d Battalion, 60th Infantry
- 3d Battalion, 60th Infantry
- 120th Adjutant General Battalion

== Campaign participation credit ==
- World War II
  - Central Europe
  - Combat Infantry Brigade – streamer
- Operation Just Cause
  - Panama
