= William Abram Mann =

American general (1854–1934)

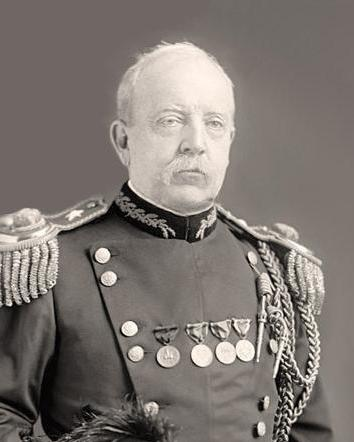
- Mann circa 1916, at about the time of his assignment as commandant of the School of Musketry.
- Born: July 31, 1854; Altoona, Pennsylvania, U.S.
- Died: October 8, 1934 (aged 80); Washington, D.C., U.S.
- Burial place: Arlington National Cemetery
- Military career
- Allegiance: United States of America
- Branch: United States Army
- Service years: 1875–1918
- Rank: Major General
- Service number: 0-13117
- Commands: 6th Infantry Regiment; Department of Dakota; Recruit Depot, Jefferson Barracks, Missouri; 3rd Infantry Regiment; 1st Brigade, Department of the East; 2nd Cavalry Brigade; School of Musketry and Field Artillery; Militia Bureau; 42nd Division; Department of the East
- Conflicts: American Indian Wars; Spanish–American War; Pancho Villa Expedition; World War I
- Awards: Silver Star
- Other work: Executive, Equitable Trust Company of New York

William Abram Mann (July 31, 1854 – October 8, 1934) was a general officer in the United States Army. He served as the commander of the 17th Infantry Brigade in the Spanish–American War and the 42nd Division ("The Rainbow Division") in World War I.

After he retired from military service, he became an executive at the Equitable Trust Company of New York. He resided in Washington D.C., until his death on October 8, 1934.

A World War II troop carrier was named for him. The USS W. A. Mann (AP-112), was commissioned in 1943 and served in World War II, the Korean War, and the Vietnam War.

== Early life and start of military career ==
Mann was born on July 31, 1854, in Altoona, Pennsylvania, the son of Anna (Bockus) Mann and Charles J. Mann. Charles J. Mann was an attorney and judge, and served as mayor of Altoona from 1884 to 1886. William A. Mann attended the schools of Altoona and obtained an appointment to the United States Military Academy. He graduated in 1875 and received a commission as a second lieutenant of Infantry.

He served in the western United States throughout the 1870 and 1880s, mostly in assignments with the 7th Cavalry. As part of the 17th Infantry Regiment, he took part in the Sioux Indian campaign of 1890 to 1891.

== Spanish–American War ==
Mann served with the 17th Infantry Regiment in the Spanish–American War, participating in the Battle of El Caney and the Siege of Santiago. He received a Silver Star for gallantry in action at El Caney. Mann also served in the Philippines in 1899 and the early 1900s. He graduated from the Army War College in 1905.

== Post Spanish–American War ==
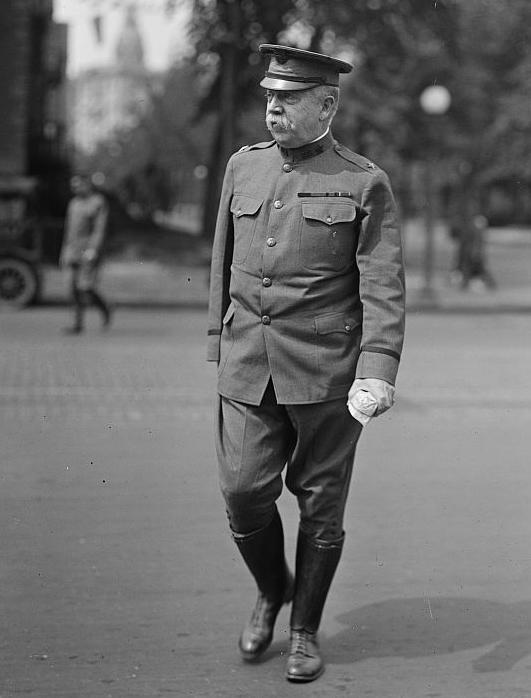
Mann circa 1917, probably as head of the Militia Bureau

From 1907 to 1909 Mann commanded the 6th Infantry Regiment at Fort William Henry Harrison, Montana, also temporarily commanding the Department of Dakota on several occasions. From 1910 to 1911 he commanded the Recruit Depot at Jefferson Barracks, Missouri.

In 1911 he was assigned to the Army's General Staff, and from 1912 to 1913 he was chief of staff for the Eastern Department in New York City. He served as chief of staff for the division based in Texas City, Texas from 1913 to 1914.

From 1914 to 1915 Mann commanded the 3rd Infantry Regiment at Madison Barracks, New York, and in 1915 he was assigned as commander of 1st Brigade, Department of the East in Albany, New York, receiving promotion to brigadier general.

In 1916 General Mann assumed command of the 2nd Cavalry Brigade in Texas during the Pancho Villa Expedition, and later took command of the School of Musketry and Field Artillery at Fort Sill, Oklahoma.

In late 1916 he was named to head the Army's Militia Bureau (now the National Guard Bureau), receiving promotion to major general.

== World War I ==
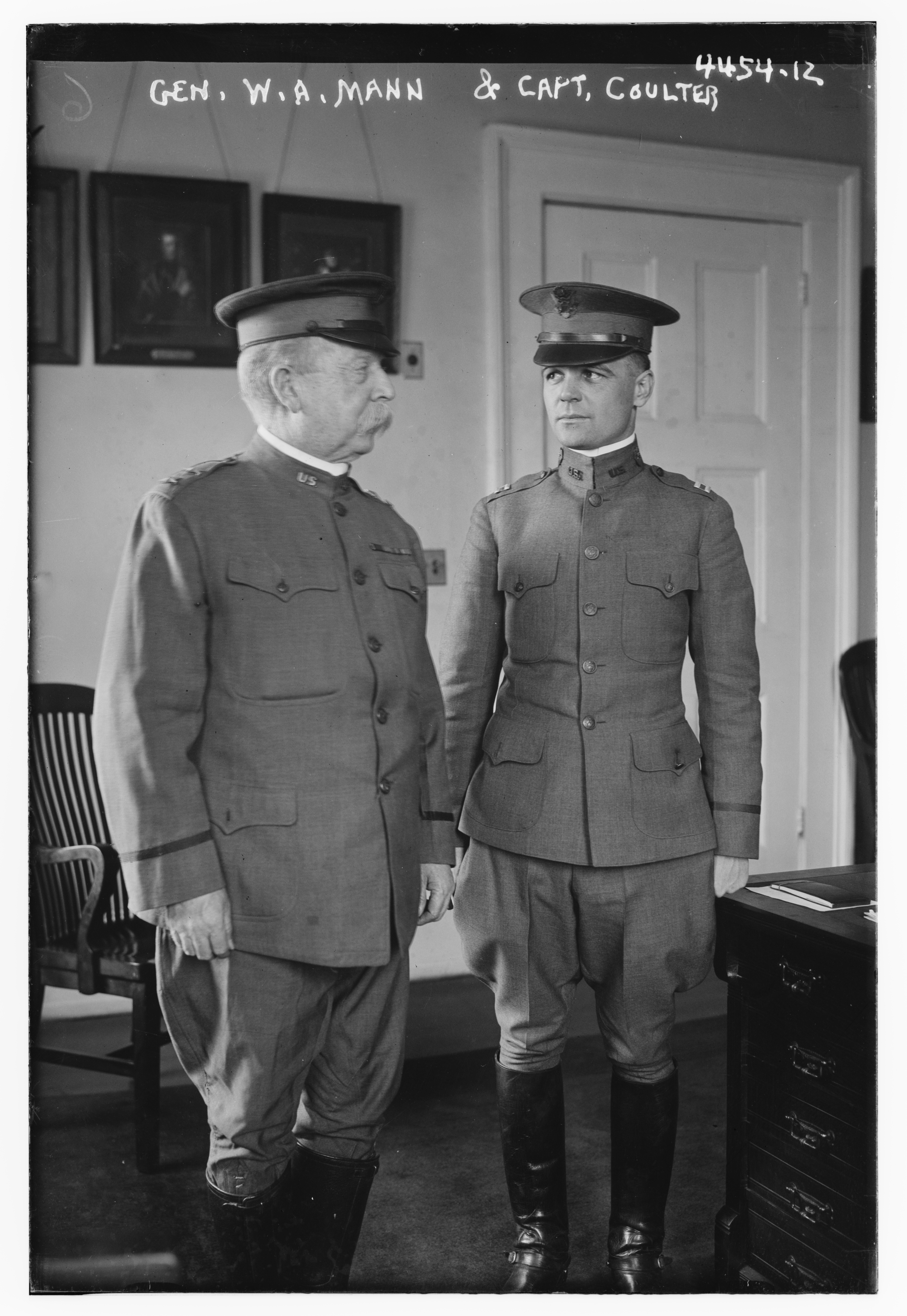
Mann along with John B. Coulter as his aide-de-camp, 1915.

Mann left the Militia Bureau in 1917 to organize and train a division for overseas serviceand was succeeded by Jesse McI. Carter. He became the first commander of the 42nd Division, nicknamed the Rainbow Division, which was composed of National Guard units from 26 states and the District of Columbia. The 42nd Division's activation was important in the development of the National Guard because it was the first time National Guard units from multiple states were organized together and it was the first time smaller Guard units were formed into a division.

Mann was within a year of mandatory retirement in November 1917, by which time he and his division had arrived in St. Nazaire, France, where it became part of the American Expeditionary Forces (AEF). He began to suffer from poor health after the organization moved to its new location at Vaucouleurs in Lorraine, making chief of staff Colonel Douglas MacArthur the de facto commander. After Mann's superior, General John J. Pershing, Commander-in-Chief (C-in-C) of the AEF, made an on-site visit and observed Mann's infirmities, he cabled the War Department requesting that Mann be relieved. Mann was relieved in command of the 42nd by Major General Charles T. Menoher, a West Point classmate of Pershing's, and soon returned to the United States and commanded the Department of the East until he retired from the army in July 1918.

== Post-military career ==
After leaving the military Mann became an executive at the Equitable Trust Company of New York.

== Retirement and death ==
In retirement Mann resided in Washington, D.C., and he died there on October 8, 1934. He was buried at Arlington National Cemetery, Section 3, Site 1996.

== Family ==
On September 10, 1884, Mann married Elsie Moir (1862–1936) of Elora, Ontario. They remained married until his death and had no children.

== Awards ==
- Distinguished Service Medal
- Silver Star
- Indian Campaign Medal
- Spanish Campaign Medal
- Mexican Border Service Medal
- World War I Victory Medal

== Legacy ==
The USS General W. A. Mann (AP-112), a World War II troop carrier, was named for him. The General Mann was commissioned in 1943, used in World War II, the Korean War and the Vietnam War, and remained in service until 1965.

== Sources ==
- U.S. Army Register, published by U.S. Army Adjutant General's Office, 1875
- Reminiscences of West Point in the Olden Time, Augusta Blanche Berard, 1886, page 50
- U.S. Army Register, published by U.S. Army Adjutant General's Office, 1888, page 266
- Historical Register of the United States Army, by Francis Bernard Heitman, 1890, Volume 1, page 450
- The World Almanac and Encyclopedia, published by Press Publishing Company, 1903, page 407
- Historical Register and Dictionary of the United States Army, 1903, Volume 1, page 687
- The Tribune Almanac and Political Register, published by the Tribune Association, 1906, Volume XVIII, No. 1, page 1866
- War Department Annual Reports, published by U.S. War Department, 1908, page 113
- Who's Who in Pennsylvania: A Biographical Dictionary of Contemporaries, 1908, Volume 2, page 466
- Journal of the Military Service Institution of the United States, 1913, Volume LII, page xii
- "Army Promotions, The Outlook, November 25, 1914
- "The General Staff, the North American Review, July 1917, Volume CCVI, page 230
- "New Army Board Named to Consider Relationship Between Department Commanders and Guard, Official U.S. Bulletin, June 28, 1917
- Current History: A Monthly Magazine of the New York Times, Volume VII, October 1917 to March 1918, page 12
- "Rainbow Division Again in Review," New York Times, October 8, 1917
- "New Commands for Returned Officers," Los Angeles Times, January 3, 1918
- "Gen. Mann to Command Eastern Department," Hartford Courant, January 3, 1918
- "Gen. Mann Goes Into Bank for Overseas," Chicago Tribune, November 24, 1918
- Trust Companies News, Banking Publicity Association of the United States, 1918, volume 27, page 624
- America's Part in the World War, Richard Joseph Beamish and Francis Andrew March 1919, page 586
- Biographical Register of the Officers and Graduates of the U.S. Military Academy, by George W. Cullum, 1920, Volume 1, page 203
- Harper's Pictorial Library of the World War, Albert Bushnell Hart, 1920, page 109
- U.S. Army Register, published by U.S. Army Adjutant General's Office, 1922, page 1198
- "Maj. Gen. W. A. Mann died at 80," New York Times, October 9, 1934
- Carbine and Lance: The Story of Old Fort Sill, Wilbur Sturtevant Nye, 1983, page 326
- U.S.S. General W.A. Mann Association web site, http://www.ussgenwamann.org/
- Maneuver and Firepower: The Evolution of Divisions and Separate Brigades, by John B. Wilson, United States Army Center of Military History, 1998, Chapter 3, end note 31

Military offices
Preceded by George W. McIver (Acting)	Chief of the National Guard Bureau; 1916–1917	Succeeded by Jesse McI. Carter
