= Fort Kobbe =

U.S. Army fort in the Panama Canal Zone

Coordinates: 8°54′N 79°35′W

Fort Kobbe was an Army fort renamed from Fort Bruja on 15 April 1932 to honor Major General William A. Kobbe. At the time it was located adjacent to Howard Air Force Base in the Panama Canal Zone. In the 1930s it was primarily a United States Army Coast Artillery Corps post. It was located on the west side of the Panama Canal. Most of the area around it was uninhabited (part of the Panama Canal Zone watershed), though Panama City could be reached by crossing the nearby Bridge of the Americas. A rock quarry was operated intermittently in the southwest corner of the Fort near the southern end of the Howard Air Force Base main runway. In the Fort, there was a series of barracks starting on the southern end of Howard Air Force Base in the level land. In the hills on the east side of the fort were Officer's Married and Bachelor Quarters, and an Officer's Club. There was a small parade field and married NCO housing in the southern end of the Fort. There was a beach in the southeast corner of the fort going into the Pacific Ocean. The beach was protected by a large shark net, as it was understood that the waters in that part of the Pacific were shark-infested. The tides were almost 12', so the beach was not a pristine site. Given that Panamanian locals did not have access to the area, the beach was not used very heavily. The eastern half of Fort Kobbe was jungle stretching over to the western side of the mouth of the Panama Canal.

The 33rd Infantry Regiment was reactivated at Fort Kobbe on 4 January 1950 and assumed responsibility for the entire Fort Kobbe/Howard Air Force Base post. The regiment was inactivated and redesignated as the 20th Infantry at Fort Kobbe in May 1956. The 20th Infantry was reorganized and redesignated 15 November 1957 as Headquarters and Headquarters Company, 1st Battle Group, 20th Infantry. It was inactivated 8 August 1962 at Fort Kobbe. Soon afterwards the 193rd Infantry Brigade was formed to expand ground forces available in the Southern Command area.

In the 1980s it was a relatively small post, and housed a battalion of paratroopers (2/187th Rakkasans and later 1/508th ABN), a firing battery of artillery (Battery B 22 Field Artillery) M-102 105mm; six gun battery with survey and search light section, a company of engineers (518th ENG CO), and a helicopter battalion (210th Combat Avn BN). Around 1986, the 518th Engineer Company was expanded into the 536th Engineer Battalion. Known as the "Nation Builders", the unit was deployed all over Central and South America on humanitarian and infrastructure projects. The unit had a company of combat engineers, Bravo Company, that came from the old 518th. The 15th Engineering Company, known as the "Road Dawgs" was a construction company. It consisted of dump trucks, graders, bulldozers, a complete quarry, a crane section, and mobile concrete trucks. The HQ Company had a well drilling detachment, as well as a Detachment of Army Divers. The unit would deploy to various undeveloped sites and, augmented with reserve troops from construction and medical units, would perform a wide variety of engineering and medical missions. This included road and bridge building, well drilling, building of churches and schools, and medical, dental, and veterinary clinics.

In 2000, Fort Kobbe was decommissioned and control was turned over to the Republic of Panama.

== Education ==
The Department of Defense Education Activity (DoDEA) formerly operated Fort Kobbe Elementary School for children of American military dependents. The DoDEA secondary schools in Panama were Curundu Middle School and Balboa High School.

== See also ==
- Howard Air Force Base
