= Fort Davis, Panama =

Former U.S. Army fort near Gatun, Panama

Coordinates: 9.2888°N 79.9074°W

Fort William D. Davis is a former U.S. Army fort near Gatun, Panama. The fort was built from 1919 to help garrison the Panama Canal Zone and was first occupied the following year. It was sited to protect the Gatun locks and was significantly expanded during World War II. The aging fort was downgraded in 1956 to a sub-installation of nearby Fort Gulick but saw a resurgence in the late 1980s when Gulick was returned to Panama. Fort Davis was handed to Panama in 1995 and is now used for civilian housing and as a police training academy.

== US base ==
The fort was one of only two US infantry bases in the Panama Canal Zone and was built to protect the Atlantic side of the canal. The other, Fort Clayton, protected the Pacific side. It was sited near to the Gatun locks and also housed a quartermaster's depot that supplied the US troops on the Atlantic side of Panama. The fort replaced Camp Gatun, a temporary installation established in January 1917. The base was named after Colonel William D. Davis, a fortifications officer who was killed in France during World War I. The area of the fort was designated by Woodrow Wilson's Executive Order 3203 of 22 December 1919 and amended by Franklin D. Roosevelt's Executive Order 6848 of 15 September 1934.

Construction began in May 1919, and the first barracks and officers' quarters were occupied by members of the 14th Infantry Regiment in December 1920. The buildings were constructed in Mission Revival and were arranged in a square with administration buildings on one side and barracks on the other three; the centre of the square was used as a parade ground. Some later buildings were built in the Spanish Colonial Revival style. The fort expanded with space for artillery, ordnance, signals, medical, and finance staff and by December 1934 housed around 1,800 soldiers. The base operated a commissary from 1934. By 1939 it had grown to house almost 4,000 men, including engineers and motor transport units.

Fort Davis was expanded greatly between 1939 and 1946 due to the build up of troops associated with World War II, particularly anti-aircraft and searchlight units. It survived a 1939 plan to build a third lock, which would have significantly reduced the size of the base. A nearby tract of land acquired as additional accommodation was later separated off as Fort Gulick.

In the post-war years new construction ceased, and maintenance of the aging buildings became problematic. In 1956 the site was downgraded to a sub-installation of Fort Gulick, mainly as barracks. It was garrisoned by the 4th Battalion of the 10th Infantry from 1962 to 1984. Part of Fort Gulick was handed over to the Republic of Panama in 1985 and Fort Davis saw a temporary increase in activity. The base was transferred to the Republic of Panama on 1 September 1995.

== Current use ==
Panama renamed the location the José Dominador Bazán residential area. It is used for civilian housing, education and production facilities, including an established 400 seat international call center (Support Services Group) in operation since 2004. It is also on the Panamanian National Police Training Academy grounds since 2014.

== See also ==
- List of former United States military installations in Panama
