= Ciudad del Saber =

Coordinates: 8.999°N 79.583°W

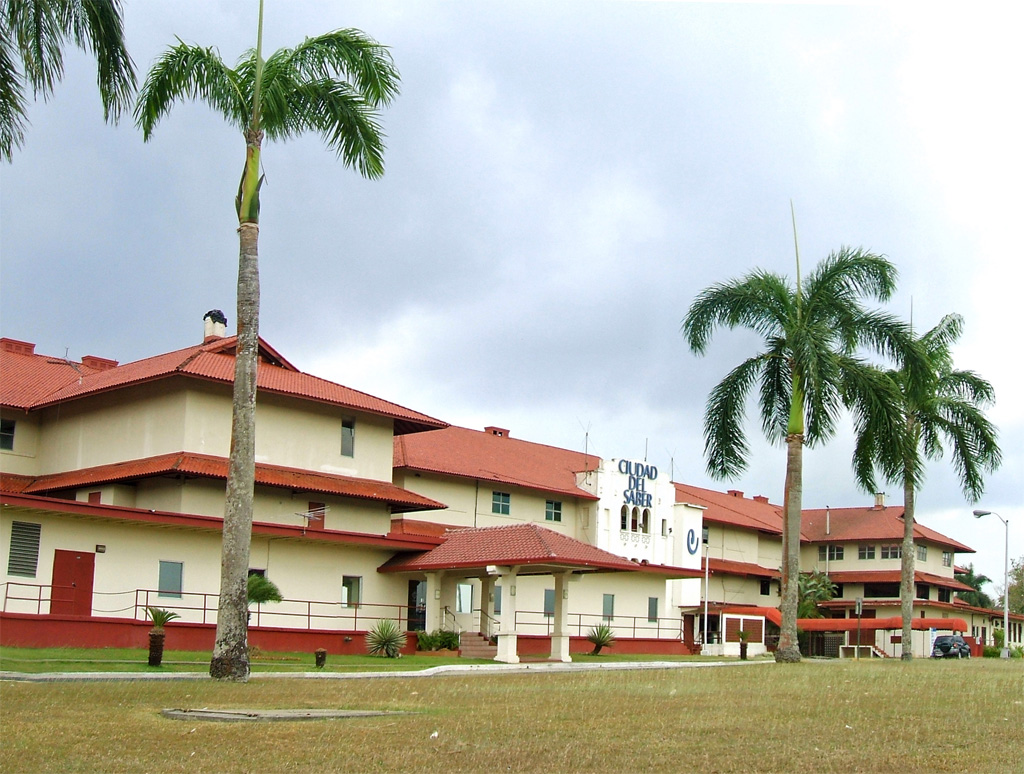
The main building in the former Fort Clayton.

Panama's Ciudad del Saber (Spanish for City of Knowledge) is a government-sponsored cluster of academic organizations, technology companies and non-governmental organizations, managed by the foundation of the same name. It is located just across the Miraflores locks, in what used to be United States Army South headquarters, Fort Clayton, now known simply as Clayton.

== History ==
Ciudad del Saber was born from the idea of converting some military areas located in the former Panama Canal Zone into a center for knowledge exchange. The project was supported by former presidents Nicolás Ardito Barletta and Ernesto Pérez Balladares, and was presented by the latter at the Summit of the Americas held in Miami, Florida, in December 1994. The non-profit foundation that manages the park today was created in 1995. The current facilities at Fort Clayton were officially handed over to the foundation by President Mireya Moscoso in November 1999, during the final stage of the implementation of the Torrijos-Carter Treaties.

Today, the institution provides facilities and support to programs in education, research, technological development and innovation, while promoting integration of institutions, business, and programs.

== Affiliates ==
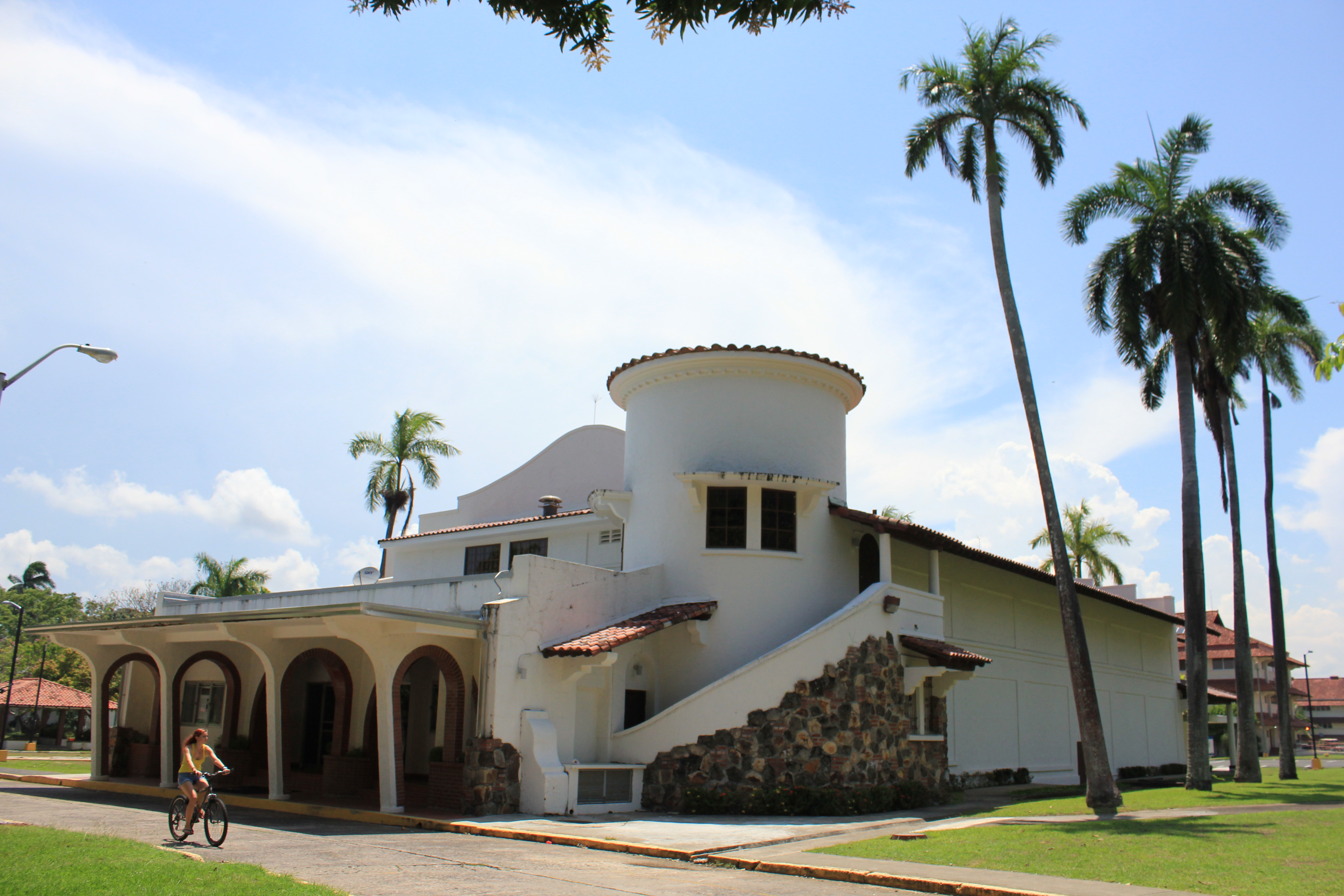
The cultural center in Ciudad del Saber,

Among its better-known affiliates are UNICEF's regional headquarters, the Red Cross, the U.S Peace Corps, the United Nations Development Programme regional office for Latin America and the Caribbean, the World Food Programme, and Plan International.

The headquarters of the World Organization of the Scout Movement's InterAmerican Region were relocated there in 2010.

Among the members of the academic section are the Balboa Academy, ILISA (a Spanish language school), Isthmus University (architecture), and international programs of Georgia Institute of Technology, McGill University, University of Pennsylvania, Florida State University (present as the Florida State University-Panama campus), Saint Louis University, Iowa State University, and SIT Study Abroad (School for International Training).
