= USS General W. A. Mann =

Navy Vessel

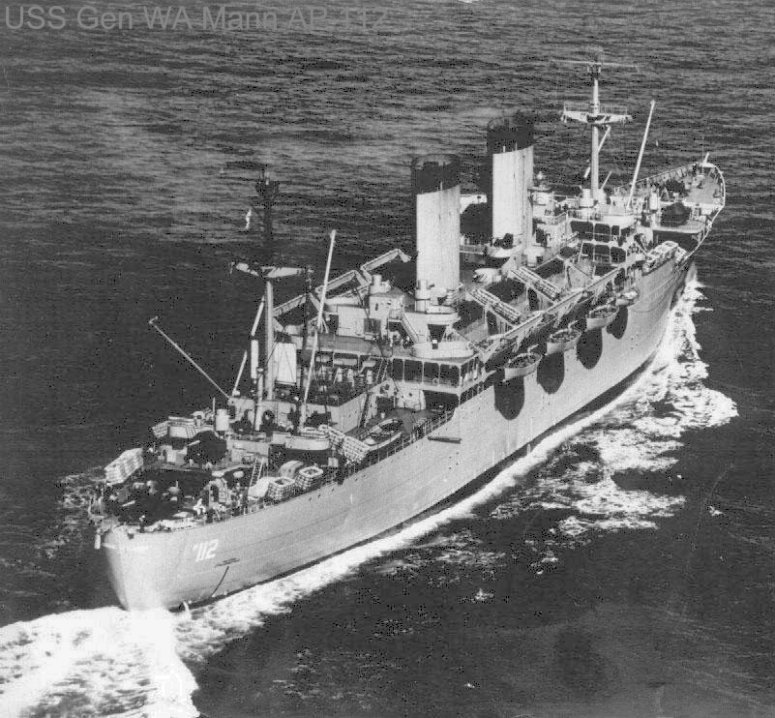
- USS General W. A. Mann (AP-112) underway

History

United States
- Name: USS General W. A. Mann
- Namesake: Major General William Abram Mann, US Army
- Builder: Federal Shipbuilding & Drydock
- Acquired: 13 October 1943
- Commissioned: 13 October 1943
- Decommissioned: 11 December 1965
- Stricken: 1 December 1966
- Identification: MC hull type P2-S2-R2, MC hull no. 670
- Honors and awards: Two service stars for the Korean War and one for the Vietnam War
- Fate: Scrapped in Taiwan, November 1987

General characteristics
- Class & type: General John Pope-class transport
- Type: troopship
- Displacement: 11,450 tons (lt); 20,175 tons fully laden
- Length: 622 feet 7 inches (189.76 m)
- Beam: 75 feet 6 inches (23.01 m)
- Draft: 25 feet 6 inches (7.77 m)
- Installed power: 17,000 shp
- Propulsion: 2 steam turbines, reduction gearing, twin screw
- Speed: 20.6 knots (38.2 km/h)
- Capacity: 5,142
- Complement: 465
- Armament: 4 x single 5"/38 caliber dual purpose guns, 4 x quad 1.1" guns, 20 x single 20mm guns

USS General W. A. Mann (AP-112) was a troop transport that served with the United States Navy in World War II, the Korean War and the Vietnam War.

General W. A. Mann, a P2-type troopship, was built by the Federal Shipbuilding and Drydock Company of Kearny, New Jersey, in 1942–43 and commissioned on the date of acquisition, 13 October 1943.

== World War II ==
Operating out of Norfolk, Virginia, General W. A. Mann delivered troops and supplies to the North African theater, making four successive round-trip voyages to Casablanca and one to Oran before mid-May 1944. She stood out 5 June 1944 for Oran again and after touching North Africa sailed thence to Rio de Janeiro, Brazil, to load Brazilian troops bound for Naples, Italy. General W. A. Mann subsequently visited Oran and Liverpool before returning to New York 14 August. On 2 September the transport got underway for Rio de Janeiro and Naples, returning to Norfolk on 21 October.

Eleven days later she sailed for Bombay, India, via Gibraltar, Algiers and the Suez Canal and returned to the west coast of the United States via Brisbane, Australia, and New Guinea, thence to San Pedro, California, arriving 13 January 1945. She made another passage to India and visited Melbourne and Noumea on the return voyage, arriving Los Angeles 15 April and thereafter steaming north to San Francisco. The ship journeyed from San Francisco to the Philippines, touching Manila and Leyte, and after reaching Pearl Harbor in early June sailed thence to Norfolk via the Panama Canal.

General W. A. Mann departed Norfolk 4 July 1945 for Marseilles, France, to redeploy troops to the Pacific. Re-entering the vast Pacific, she called at Okinawa via Eniwetok and Ulithi in September and returned to Seattle, Washington 28 October.

From 2 November 1945 to 5 January 1946 she made a round trip voyage from Seattle to Nagasaki and Wakayama, Japan, setting the pattern of a series of "Magic Carpet" passages and "Diaper Runs" in which servicemen and their families were carried to and from the Far East. She stood duty as a "Guam Ferry" and continued to transport men and material until transferred to the Military Sea Transportation Service in October 1949.

== Korean War ==
In the Korean War General W. A. Mann carried precious Republic of Korea government cargo, including gold and silver bullion valued at $1.5 million as well as the private papers of President of South Korea Syngman Rhee, from Pusan to San Francisco, 1 to 15 August 1950.

She transported troops from San Francisco, California to Yokohama Japan with a brief stop in Hawaii, arriving 23 May 1953 after a one-day delay to participate in a search for a man overboard from a minesweeper.

== 1950s-1960s ==
On 16 June 1951, she sailed on a round-the-world voyage which took her from San Francisco via the Panama Canal to New Orleans and thence via Dover, England, to Bremerhaven, Germany. From this latter port, she returned to New York and thence steamed back to Bremerhaven via Dover as before, getting underway for Morocco, Suez, Colombo, Indochina, and finally to San Francisco 22 September 1951 via Guam and Hawaii.

From 1952 to 1962 General W. A. Mann made frequent trans-Pacific runs to Japan, Korea, Okinawa, Guam, the Philippines, and Taiwan out of west coast ports, and occasional passages to Alaska.

=== Cuban Missile Crisis and Vietnam ===
In October 1962 during the Cuban Missile Crisis, General W. A. Mann sailed from San Diego, California for the Caribbean with 55,000 pounds of provisions in case these supplies should be needed. When relative calm came to the Caribbean, General W. A. Mann returned to the Pacific and continued her important transportation runs from the West Coast to the Far East. Transport included US Marines in August–December 1964 to Okinawa and under Capt. Ben W. Blee with trips to Da Nang, South Vietnam, August - December 1965.

== Decommission ==
General W. A. Mann was struck 1 December 1966, transferred to the Maritime Administration on 20 December 1966, and placed in the National Defense Reserve Fleet at Hudson River, New York. She was transferred to the National Defense Reserve Fleet at Fort Eustis on the James River in Virginia on 21 July 1969. On 10 April 1987 she was sold for scrap for $1,050,050, and scrapped in Taiwan in November of that year.

== Awards ==
- European-African-Middle Eastern Campaign Medal
- Asiatic-Pacific Campaign Medal
- World War II Victory Medal
- Navy Occupation Medal with "ASIA" clasp
- China Service Medal
- National Defense Service Medal with star
- Korean Service Medal with two campaign stars
- Vietnam Service Medal with one campaign star
- United Nations Korea Medal
- Republic of Vietnam Campaign Medal
