= Fort Gulick =

U.S. Army base in the Panama Canal Zone

Coordinates: 9°19′N 79°52′W

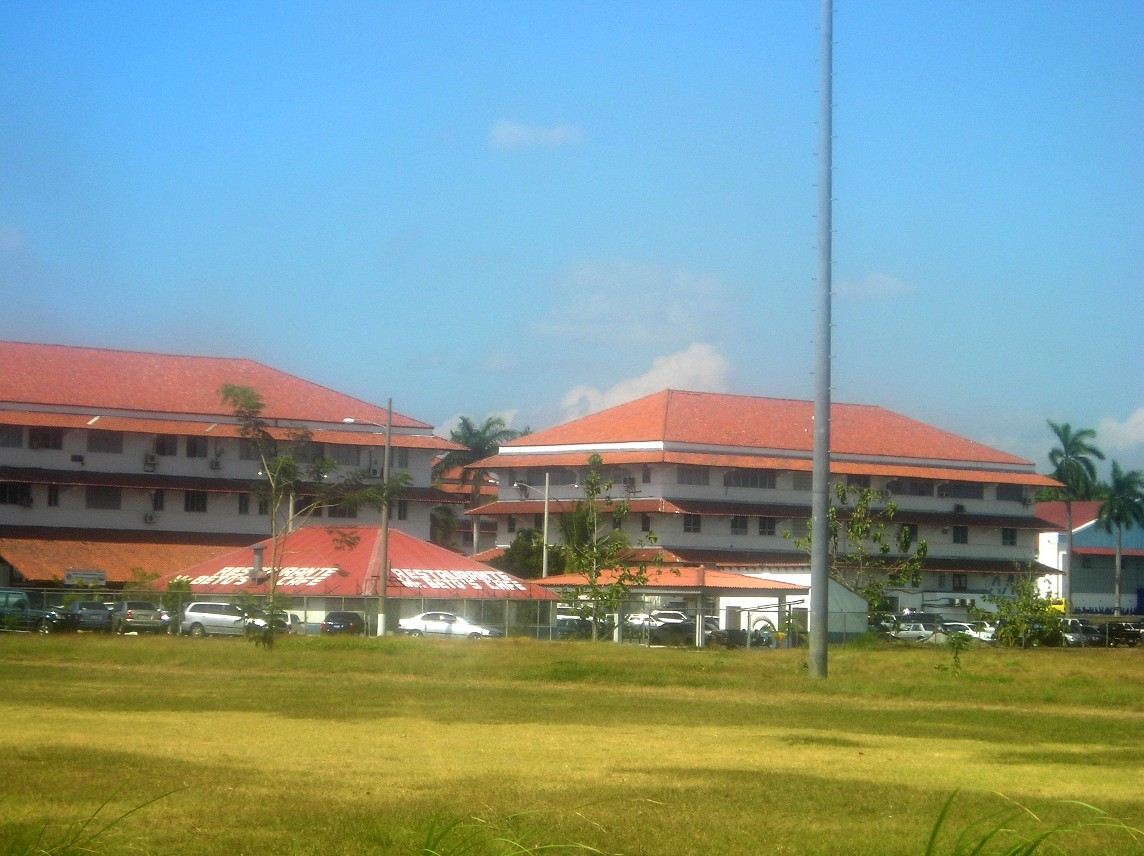
Buildings of the Escuela de las Americas (2006)

Fort Gulick was a United States Army base in the former Panama Canal Zone located on the Atlantic side of the Panama Canal near Fort Davis, on Gatun Lake.

== History ==
The post was constructed and opened in 1941, and named for John W. Gulick, a U.S. Army major general who served as the Chief of Coast Artillery from 1930 to 1934, and commanded a brigade in Panama in 1935 and 1936. It is one of the most disputed and notorious U.S. institutions (dictator school), as Latin Americans were "formed" to avoid communism in the continent. Some of the worst human rights violators emerged from there: the Argentinian dictator Alberto Galieri, Roberto d'Aubisson from El Salvador - both having killed or made "disappear" thousands of people. It was perhaps best known as the home installation of the 8th Special Forces Group (Airborne) (Special Action Force) from 1962 until the 8th SFG (A) inactivation, and the location of the School of the Americas. In 1984, control of the fort was turned over to the Republic of Panama who renamed it Fuerte Espinar. The U.S. retook over administration of the fort as a result of the 1989 United States invasion of Panama, but kept the name of Fort Espinar.

The former site of Fort Gulick is now part of the municipal district of Colón, Panama, and is the location of the Hotel Melia.

== Military history ==
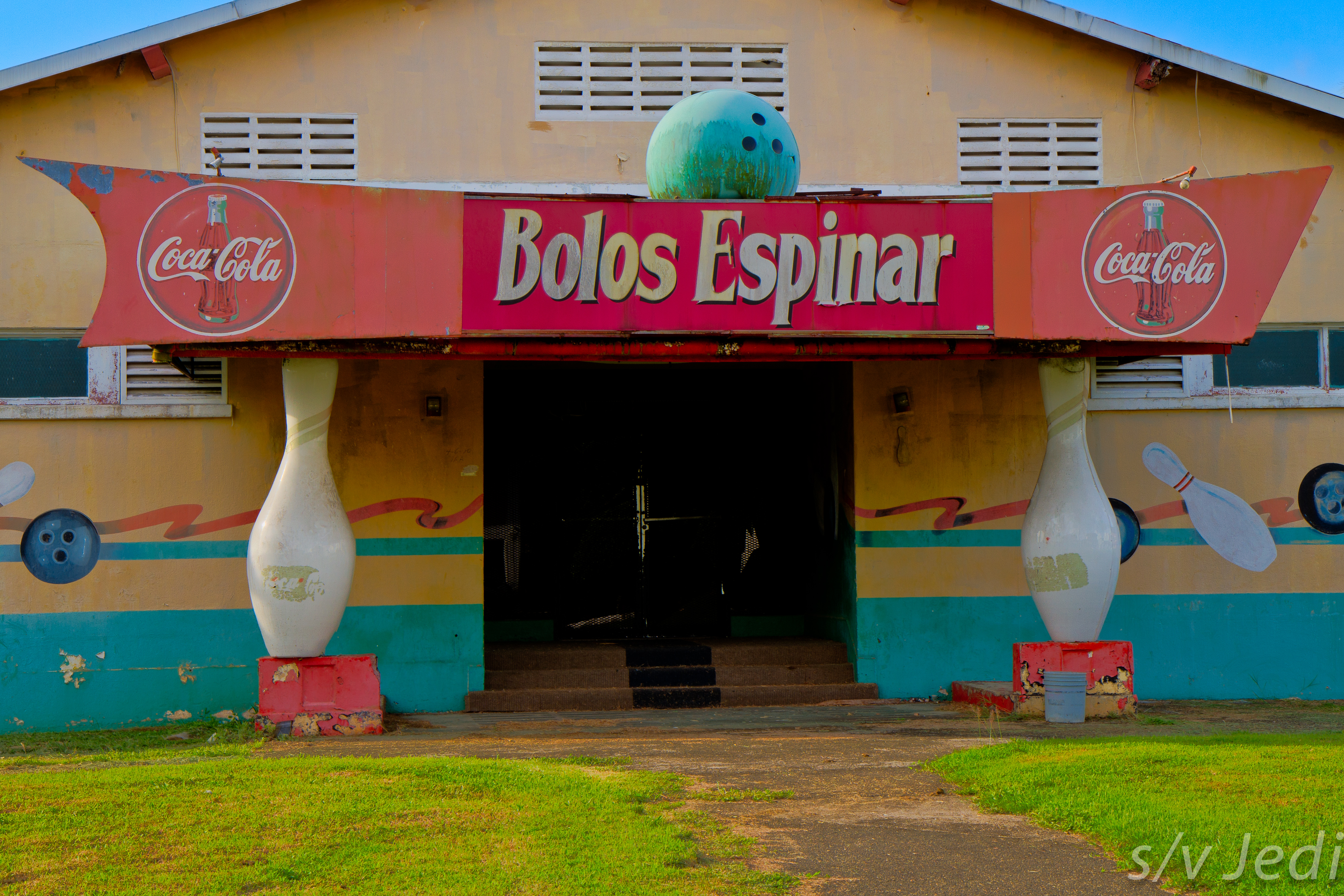
Abandoned bowling alley in Fort Gulick

During the period of 1973–1979, Fort Gulick was home to Company B, 4th Battalion 10th Infantry. The rest of the 4th Battalion 10th Infantry was located at Fort Davis while construction of the barracks was on-going. This assignment gave Company B a unique training environment. The Company supported the U.S. Army School of the Americas during its tactical exercises at Fort Sherman and the Pina Training area as well as supporting the 3rd Battalion 7th Special Forces Group (Airborne) based at Fort Gulick.

The 7th Special Forces was headquartered at Fort Bragg, North Carolina, but had the 3rd Battalion at Fort Gulick. Prior to the 7th SFG (A) deploying to Canal Zone, the 8th Special Forces Group had operated in the Central and South American area. One of the 8th SFG (A) historic participation was in the training of a Bolivian Ranger unit to pursue Ernesto "Che" Guevara and his guerrillas.

Along with the above-mentioned units, the 549th MP Company also called Fort Gulick home for extended periods of time. The companies moved from Fort Gulick to Fort Davis and back multiple times (two confirmed moves happened in 1962 and 1984) for various administrative reasons. The 549th MP and 3/7 SFG barracks were "next-door neighbors" on Fort Gulick, with only 20 meters separating the buildings.

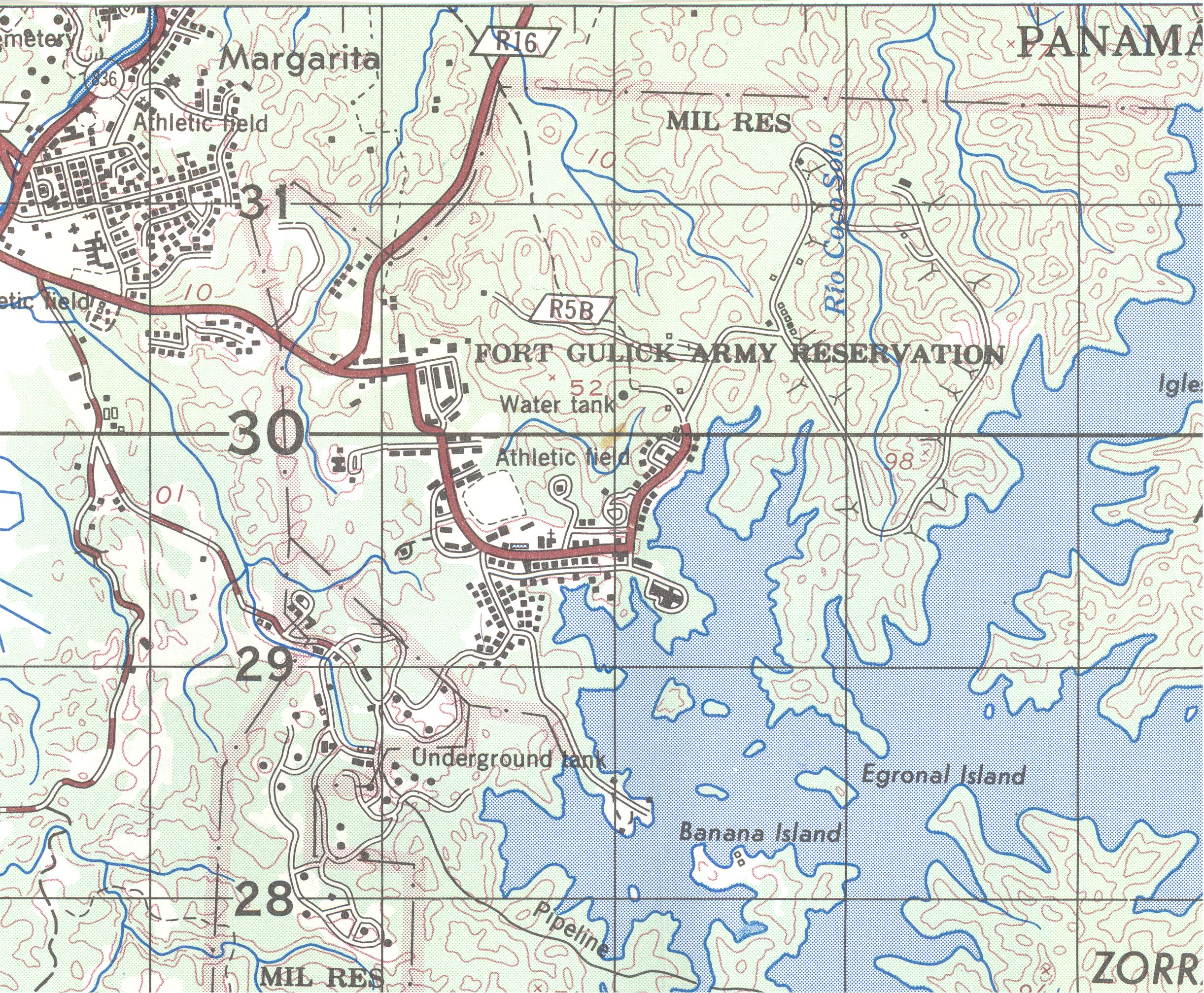
Fort Gulick map, 1979

The Panama Canal Treaties of 1977 called for the United States to turn Fort Gulick over to the Panamanian government in August–September 1984. In fulfillment of these terms, the 549th MP Company, The Provost Marshal's Office (PMO) and 3/7 SFG moved their commands and barracks back to Fort Davis, which had been their former and long time home while in the Republic of Panama. These units remained on Fort Davis until The United States turned over all installations to the Panamanian government.

During (and previous to) this time, Fort Gulick had been jointly occupied by the U.S. Army and the Panamanian Defense Forces (PDF). The PDF barracks also enjoyed residence on Fort Gulick, as did the U.S. Army School of The Americas. In late 1984, the School of The Americas lost its home at Fort Gulick and was relocated to Fort Benning in the United States.

Fort Gulick went through several rapid name changes when control was given over to the Panamanian government, among those being Fort Manuel Antonio Noriega and Fort Jose Domingo Espinar. It was eventually given its current name, Fort Espinar.

== See also ==
- List of former United States military installations in Panama
- Naval Base Panama Canal Zone
