= Fort Clayton =

US Army base in the Panama Canal Zone

Coordinates: 9°00′00″N 79°34′59″W

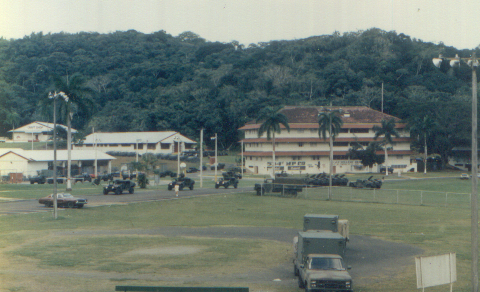
The Northwest corner of Fort Clayton in 1990, home at the time to the 534th MP Co., 154th Signal Bn, and the Southern Command Network radio and TV station.

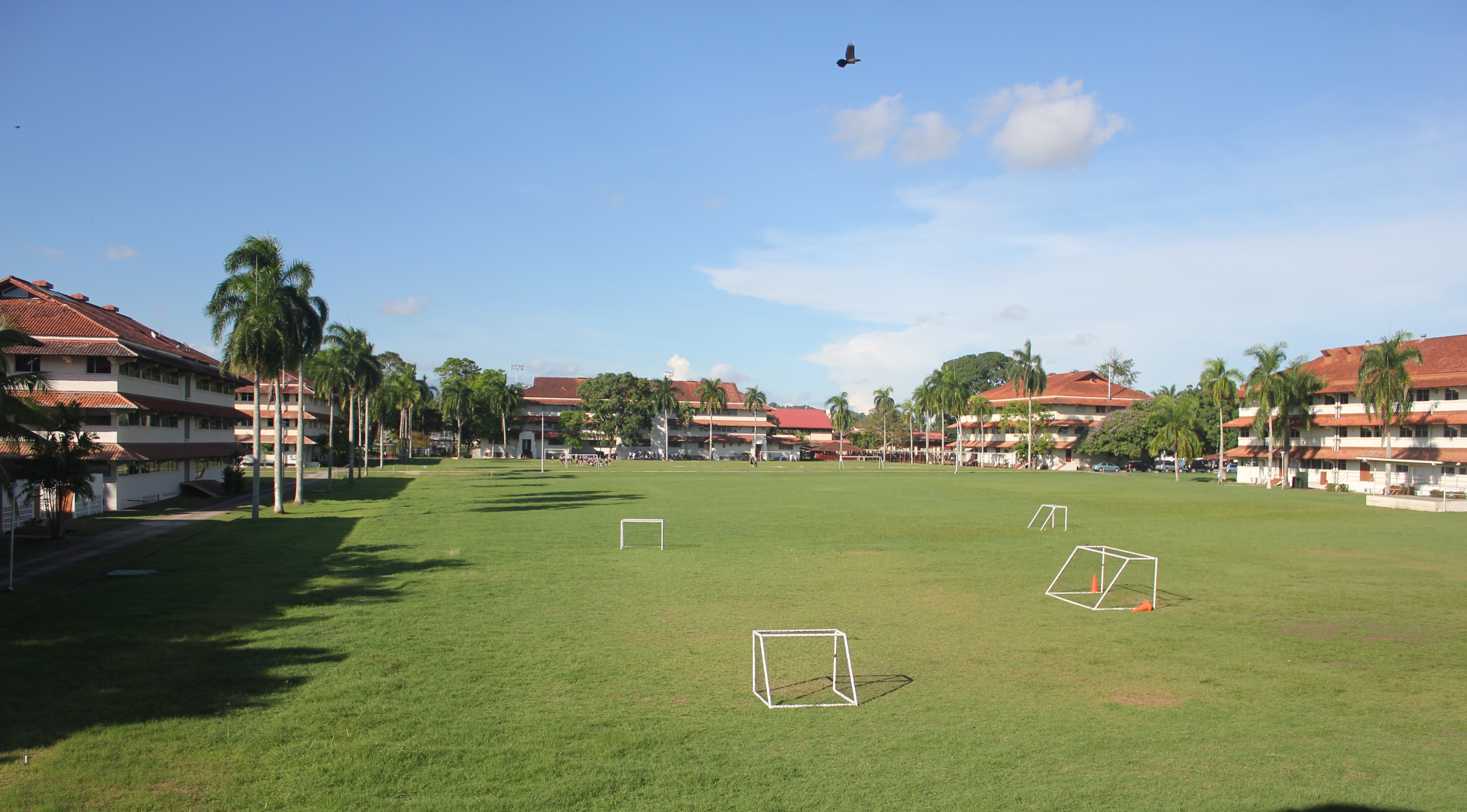
The area in 2012.

Fort Clayton was a United States Army base in the former Panama Canal Zone, later part of the Republic of Panama.

== Base ==
Fort Clayton was located northwest of Balboa, Panama, with the Panama Canal located nearby. It closed in 1999 pursuant to the Torrijos-Carter Treaties. The Southern Command Network and 193rd Infantry Brigade were both headquartered there, as was the headquarters of United States Army South prior to its relocation to Fort Buchanan, Puerto Rico. The 534th Military Police Battalion stationed here was partly responsible for law enforcement patrols on all Pacific side military installations. This base also had significant on base housing for military families in addition to many barracks. Portions of the installation overlook the Miraflores Locks of the Panama Canal.

It is now used for residential housing, schools, and the headquarters of the "Ciudad del Saber" (City of Knowledge). Sports grounds in Fort Clayton include the home of the Panama national cricket team.

== Education ==
The Department of Defense Education Activity (DoDEA) formerly operated Fort Clayton Elementary School for children of American military dependents. Curundu Elementary School was also in Fort Clayton. The DoDEA secondary schools in Panama were Curundu Middle School and Balboa High School.

== See also ==
- List of former United States military installations in Panama
- Naval Base Panama Canal Zone
