= Biloxi (disambiguation) =

Biloxi, Mississippi is a city in southeastern Mississippi, United States.

Biloxi may also refer to:

== People ==
- Biloxi people, a historical indigenous people who lived along the Mississippi River
- Tunica-Biloxi the federally recognized tribe which includes the descendants of the original Biloxi tribe

== Places ==
=== Mississippi ===
- Biloxi (Amtrak station), an unstaffed railroad station
- Biloxi River
- Biloxi Public School District
- Biloxi High School
- Gulfport–Biloxi International Airport
- Gulfport–Biloxi metropolitan area, the three-county MSA in southeastern Mississippi
- Gulfport–Biloxi–Pascagoula Combined Statistical Area, the five-county CSA in southeastern Mississippi

=== Other places ===
- Biloxi, Texas, a village in southeastern Texas

== Other uses ==
- Biloxi (album), an album by Jimmy Buffett
- Biloxi language, an extinct Siouan-Catawban language once spoken by the Biloxi tribe
- "Biloxi", a song written by Jesse Winchester
- Fort Biloxi, a fictitious locale in the 1980 film Private Benjamin
- USS Biloxi (CL-80), a US Navy light cruiser
- Biloxi Shuckers
