= Biloxi High School =

Public school in Mississippi, United States

Coordinates: 30°26′09″N 88°56′15″W

Location
- 1845 Tribe Drive; Biloxi, Mississippi 39532; United States

Information
- Type: Public
- Established: 1910
- School district: Biloxi Public School District
- Principal: Lea Milton
- Staff: 108.71 (FTE)
- Enrollment: 1,697 (2023-2024)
- Student to teacher ratio: 15.61
- Colors: Red and White
- Team name: Indians
- Website: bhs.biloxischools.net

Biloxi High School is the only public high school located in the city of Biloxi, Mississippi. It has approximately 1,650 students and 150 faculty.

== History ==
The original Biloxi High School was built in 1912 on Howard Avenue. A “new” Biloxi High School was constructed in 1961 – at a cost of $1.6 million – on Father Ryan Avenue. Biloxi architects Henry Francis Fountain and Carl E. Matthes are credited with being involved with its design.

The current Biloxi High School hailed as a “state of the art” facility, opened in 2002. The school serves grades 9, 10, 11, and 12. The $35 million facilities, named one of the best schools in the country by the U.S. Department of Education in 2006, features a campus nestled on about 90 acres (360,000 m^{2}) between the Back Bay of Biloxi and Interstate 10. This facility includes fully equipped science laboratories; computer labs; a 200-seat performance hall; practice and competition gymnasiums; tennis courts; a football stadium; baseball and softball stadiums with indoor batting cages; music areas with individual practice rooms and risers; and kilns in the art classrooms.

Recently, Biloxi High finished the construction of its brand-new addition to the west side of the school. With an estimated 14 million dollar price tag, the addition was funded with monies split between existing gaming revenues and property taxes. The new wing includes an internet cafe, three dozen more classrooms, and a new contemporary-style courtyard. The purpose of the addition was to accommodate the move of the ninth grade from Biloxi Junior High School, a move that is set to bring around 400 new students onto the campus of Biloxi High. As of the School Year 09–10, Biloxi High School serves grades 9-12.

== Security ==
The Biloxi Public School District installed cameras in every classroom and hallway in 2003. The district has developed a police department within the school district. As of 2008, three officers made up the force and more were expected to be hired. The officers were assigned to "precincts" within the district. One wes patrolling the two schools north of the Popp's Ferry Bridge, one patrolling the alternative school, and the other was responsible for the schools on the east side of the district. Two of the officers were equipped with 2008 Dodge Chargers and the other drove a late model Crown Victoria Police Interceptor model.

== Curriculum ==
Accelerated classes are available in the English department, and Advanced Placement or AP classes are offered in Math, English, Art, History, and Science. Biloxi High School also offers a range of classes in its vocational department from child care to auto body.

== AP classes ==
AP students are often allowed opportunities, including the We the People experience, History Day, and the Stock Market Game. Biloxi High won 1st place in Fall 2007 for the Stock Market Game out of 700 schools. A team of seniors won a trip to New York City, where they visited Good Morning America, and the New York Stock Exchange, under the supervision of their AP Government teacher.

== Sports ==
BHS offers an extensive range of sports programs. BHS is also equipped with a sports medicine director.

== Blue Ribbon ==
In 2007, Biloxi High School was one of only four schools in the State of Mississippi, and one of only 287 in the nation to win Blue Ribbon Status. This is defined under the "No Child Left Behind Act", as being a school with more than forty percent of the school's population at or below poverty level, yet still meeting and going beyond "AYP" (Adequate Yearly Progress). Schools with these students, regardless of background, are in the top ten percent of the state on standardized curriculum tests. The principals of the selected schools will travel to Washington, D.C. to receive the official recognition on November 12–13.

== Student organizations and media ==
=== Student Council ===
The Student Council is a body made up of students elected by their peers to serve as a bridge between the school administration and the students of Biloxi High School. The Biloxi High School Student Council is a member of the Mississippi Association of Student Councils "MSASC", The Southern Association of Student Councils. and The National Association of Student Councils. The Biloxi High School Student Council produces and sponsors WBHS, the school's in-house, closed-circuit, television station.

=== Key Club ===
The Biloxi High Key Club is one of the most active clubs in the school and is also student-led. The members participate in service activities for their school and community. They have worked with: the City of Biloxi, the American Heart Association, American Cancer Society's Relay for Life, Lynn Meadows, the Humane Society, and many more. They are part of Division 14-A in the LaMissTenn District of Key Club International. The Key Club International motto, which has been adopted by the BHS Key Club is, "Caring, Our Way of Life."

=== Hi-Tide ===
The Hi-Tide is a quarterly newspaper that is published by Biloxi High School. The main goal of the Hi-Tide is to keep students, faculty, staff, and community members informed of current events at Biloxi High School.

=== National Honor Society ===
The National Honor Society is an honorary association made up of students who excel in scholarship, character, leadership, and service. Students are selected by the faculty council in the fall of their junior or senior year.

=== Technology Student Association ===
The Technology Student Association (TSA) is a student organization open to students who are enrolled in or who have completed technology education courses.

=== Environmental Club ===
The Biloxi High School's Environmental Club is a service club dedicated to helping students become partners in stewardship. Students who enroll in the club often find themselves becoming gradually more aware of environmental and community issues. There are several service projects that the Environmental Club is involved in including a "Paws for a Cause" chapter benefiting the Harrison County Humane Society in the fall, and the American Cancer Society's "Relay for Life" held at the high school every spring.

Students often schedule a workday outside of normal school hours to help keep Biloxi High's Nature Trail environmentally clean and available for other classes and visitors. Posts and signs indicating natural flora have been placed along the nature trail and are maintained by the Environmental Club.

The Environmental Club at BHS also raises money to sponsor Biloxi High's Canon Envirothon Competition Team. Each year, a team of five students with one alternate attends a local competition and competes for scholarships in areas such as aquatics and water quality, soil science, forestry and land management, and wildlife.

=== International Culture Club ===
The International Culture Club comprises students who wish to understand, appreciate, and study international culture.

=== Health and Fitness Club ===
The Health and Fitness Club is made up of a group of students who wish to stay fit and healthy throughout their high school careers.

=== SADD Club ===
SADD (Students Against Destructive Decisions) Club is run by the AFJROTC program. Its goal is to discourage drug use and other common teen vices while encouraging community involvement.

=== Tri-M Honor Society ===
Formerly known as M.A.Y.O. (Music Appreciation Youth Organization) to the students of Biloxi High. Tri-M is a national honor society that deals in the musical education needed for growing musicians around the country.

== Notable alumni ==
- Bob Barney, American academic and sports historian
- Dave Barney, American educator and swimming coach
- Genesis Be, recording artist and visual art creator
- Isaiah Canaan (Class of 2009), professional basketball player for the Philadelphia 76ers in the NBA
- Michael Coats Jr. (Class of 2020), NFL cornerback for the Cleveland Browns
- Lorenzo Diamond, professional football player for the Arizona Cardinals and the Miami Dolphins in the NFL
- Robert Ducksworth (Class of 1981), professional football player for the New York Jets in the NFL
- Ronald Dupree (Class of 1999), professional basketball player for six seasons in the NBA
- Larry Evans, professional football player for the Denver Broncos and the San Diego Chargers in the NFL
- Fred Haise (Class of 1951), NASA astronaut, member of the 1970 Apollo 13 mission to the Moon
- Aleshea Harris (Class of 1999), playwright
- Tim Jones (Class of 2016), professional football player for the Jacksonville Jaguars in the NFL
- Colt Keith (Class of 2020), MLB second baseman for the Detroit Tigers
- Barry Lyons (Class of 1978), professional baseball player for the New York Mets of Major League Baseball
- Howard McDonnell, member of the Mississippi House of Representatives and the Mississippi State Senate
- Charles K. Pringle (Class of 1949), Biloxi lawyer and one of the first two Republicans to serve in the Mississippi House of Representatives
- David Sheffield (Class of 1967), Comedy Writer & Hollywood Screenwriter for Saturday Night Live, Coming to America, and The Nutty Professor (1996 film)
- Shayna Steele (Class of 1993), singer, songwriter and Broadway stage actress
- Wimpy Winther (Class of 1967), professional football player
