= Leonard Fairley =

American football player (born 1951)

No. 29
- Position: Cornerback

Personal information
- Born: January 2, 1951 (age 75); Biloxi, Mississippi, U.S.
- Listed height: 5 ft 11 in (1.80 m)
- Listed weight: 200 lb (91 kg)

Career information
- High school: M. F. Nichols (Biloxi)
- College: Alcorn A&M
- NFL draft: 1974: 7th round, 157th overall pick

Career history
- Houston Oilers (1974); Buffalo Bills (1974)

Awards and highlights
- First-team Little All-American (1973)

Career NFL statistics
- Games played: 2
- Stats at Pro Football Reference

Leonard C. Fairley (born January 2, 1951) is an American former professional football player who was a cornerback for one season with the Houston Oilers of the National Football League (NFL). He was selected by the Oilers in the seventh round of the 1974 NFL draft after playing college football for the Alcorn A&M Braves (now Alcorn State). Fairley was also a member of the Buffalo Bills.

== Early life ==
Fairley attended M. F. Nichols High School in Biloxi, Mississippi.

== College career ==
Fairley played strong safety for the Braves at Alcorn Agricultural and Mechanical College. He was inducted into the Alcorn State Sports Hall of Fame in 2010.

== Professional career ==
Fairley was selected by the Houston Oilers in the seventh round with the 157th pick in the 1974 NFL draft. He played in two games for the Oilers during the 1974 season. He was later released by the Oilers. Fairley signed with the Buffalo Bills on October 1, 1974.
