= Bob Barney =

American academic and sports historian (born 1932)

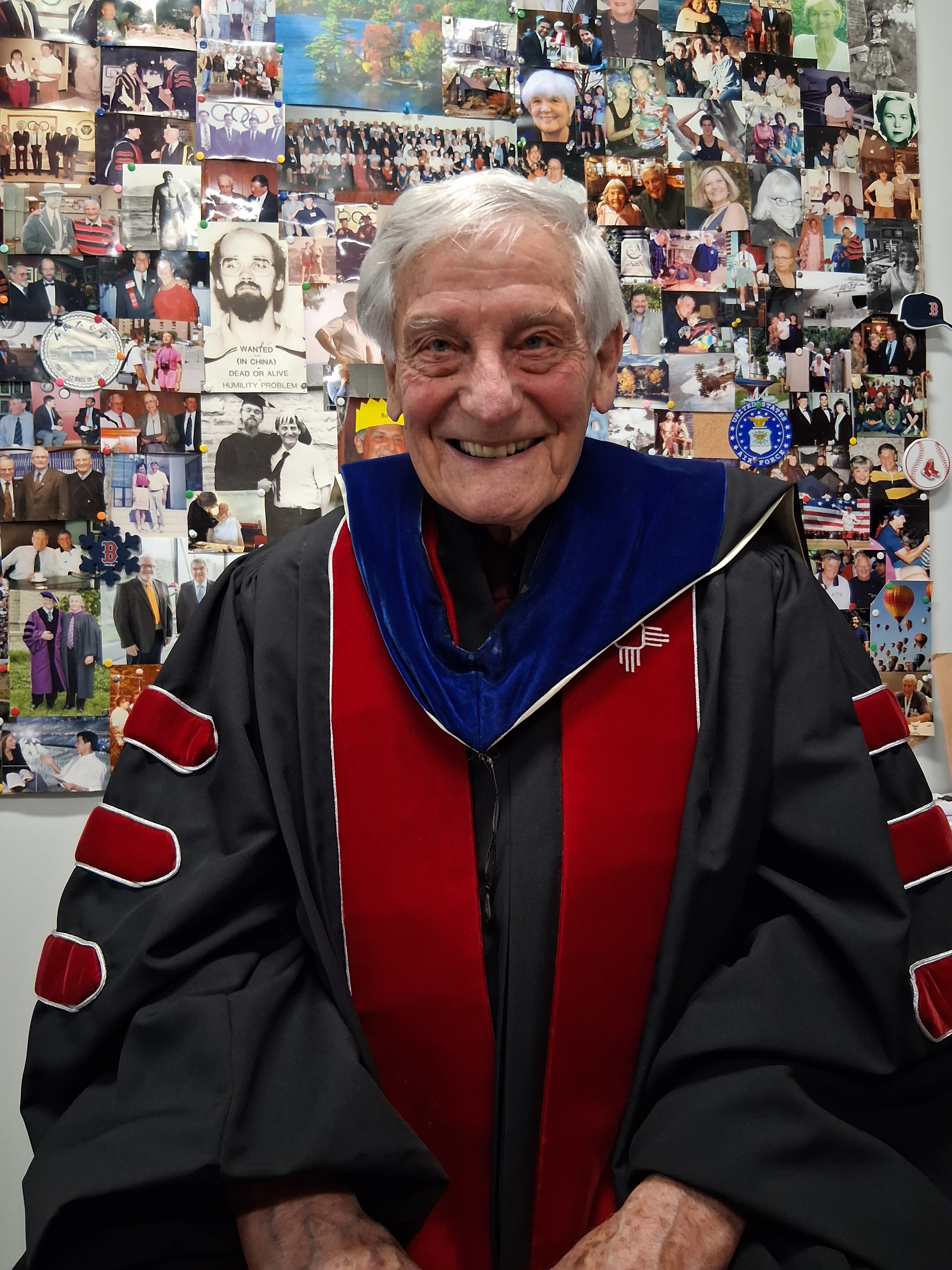
- Barney in 2025
- Born: January 5, 1932 (age 94); Winthrop, Massachusetts, US
- Education: University of New Mexico
- Occupations: Professor; writer
- Years active: 1968–present
- Employer: University of Western Ontario
- Known for: International Center for Olympic Studies; International Society of Olympic Historians
- Family: Dave Barney (brother)
- Awards: Olympic Order; Pierre de Coubertin medal

Robert Knight Barney (born January 5, 1932) is an American academic and sports historian. A veteran of the United States Air Force during the Korean conflict, he attended the University of New Mexico where he was a three-sport varsity athlete, and earned bachelor's, master's and doctorate degrees. He coached the New Mexico Lobos swimming team to seven winning seasons, and was a professor of physical education. At the University of Western Ontario, he served as director of intercollegiate athletics from 1972 to 1979, then focused on teaching, writing and research, and became a professor emeritus in 1996. He received an honorary Doctor of Laws degree from the University of Western Ontario in 2014, and is inducted into the sports hall of fame for both the Western Mustangs and the New Mexico Lobos.

As a baseball historian, Barney's research verified the oldest-known game played in Canada—June 4, 1838—in Beachville, Ontario. He has served on the board of directors for the Canadian Baseball Hall of Fame, and advocated for relocating the hall of fame to St. Marys, Ontario, and was chairman of the induction selection committee. He spent three years investigating the history of Labatt Park, validating its claim as baseball's oldest and continuously operated park, and assisted on the park's application for national heritage site distinction.

In 1989, Barney established the International Centre for Olympic Studies at the University of Western Ontario, to research the history and sociocultural impacts of the Olympics. In 1992, he began Olympika, the first peer-reviewed academic journal focused on the Olympics. He has served as president of the North American Society for Sport History, is a member of the International Society of Olympic Historians, and was associate editor of the Journal of Olympic History. He co-authored the book Selling the Five Rings (2002), which discussed the history of corporate sponsorships and television rights for the Olympic Games. For his scholarly work on history of the Olympics, he received the Olympic Order in 1997, and the Pierre de Coubertin medal in 2009.

== Early life ==
Robert Knight Barney was born in Winthrop, Massachusetts, on January 5, 1932. (Note: Barney's twin brother Dave was reported to have his 75th birthday on January 5, 2007, and his 83rd birthday on January 5, 2015, both indicating that he was born on January 5, 1932.) (Note: Multiple sources report Bob and Dave Barney as twin brothers, although one source mistakenly lists Dave and Peter as twins, instead of Bob and Dave.) His father Robert S. Barney, was a colonel in the United States Air Force, and a veteran of World War II and the Korean War. Barney's mother Blanche Geraldine Barney was a descendant from the youngest passenger of the 1620 voyage by the Mayflower, and a soldier who served in the American Revolutionary War.

Barney is the older of mirror image twins to his brother Dave. They grew up playing baseball, and swam at the family's summer home on Newfound Lake near Bristol, New Hampshire. The family moved according to their father's military service, including stays in Rochester, New Hampshire, Lake Charles, Louisiana, Biloxi, Mississippi, the island of Guam, and the Panama Canal Zone. The Barneys attended six elementary schools across the United States, and seven high schools around the world, including Spaulding High School, Biloxi High School, Aurora High School, George Washington High School, and Balboa High School. While living in Mississippi, he reached the state tennis doubles semifinals with his brother, and first became involved in swimming and water polo while living in Panama. (Note: Krider (2014) wrote, "At one time or another they competed in football, baseball, hockey, softball, boxing and tennis. He and Peter, with no experience, once made the state tennis doubles semifinals in Mississippi.", and "His first taste of swimming came during his senior year in Panama, when tried water polo for eight weeks." However, multiple reliable sources indicate that Bob and Dave are the twins, not Dave and Peter.) Barney and his brother Dave graduated from Balboa High School in Panama, and briefly attended Canal Zone Junior College in Balboa. During high school, Barney lettered in football, baseball, basketball, track and field, tennis, and swimming.

== University of New Mexico ==
=== Undergraduate and military years ===
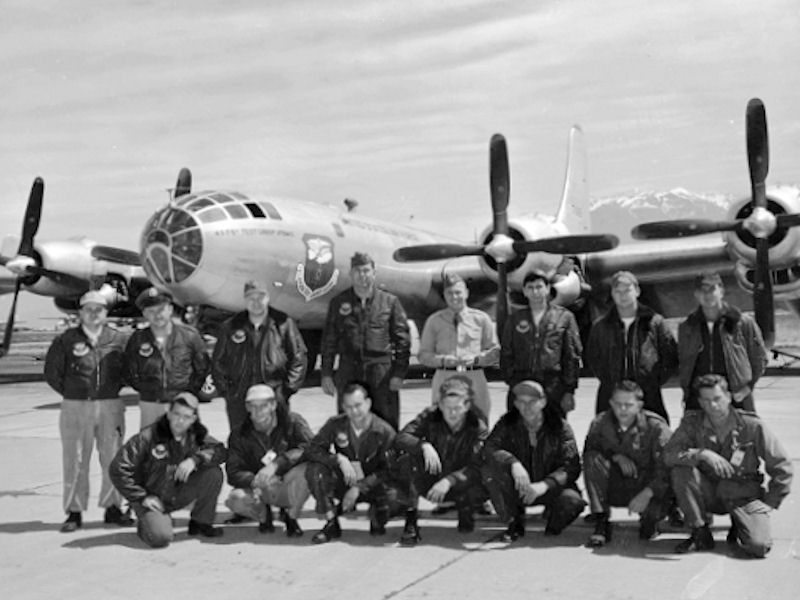
4925th Test Group (Atomic) at Kirtland Air Force Base

Barney enrolled at University of New Mexico (UNM) in 1950, played football for the Lobos in his freshman year, then joined the United States Air Force by 1951. In four years with the Air Force, he was an atomic armorer for nuclear weapons testing in the western United States and the South Pacific, and served in the Korean conflict. He also played for the 4925th Atomics in the Duke City Baseball League, participated in New Mexico amateur swim meets with the Kirtland Air Force Base team, and played defense and goaltender for the Kirtland Air Force Base Flyers in the Sandia Mountain Hockey League.

After military service, Barney resumed studies at UNM in 1955. During the summer, Barney was an instructor at Albuquerque YMCA learn-to-swim clinics. Barney and his brother Dave participated in intramural sports, won multiple swimming events, and were offered a scholarship for books and tuition to join the Lobos swimming team in 1957. (Note: Krider (2014) wrote, "The University of New Mexico built a six-lane pool in 1957 and hired a coach from Denver who immediately began searching for swimmers. As Barney put it, "My brother and I had cleaned up in intramural swimming and he offered us tuition and books. We swam for two years. We still were playing baseball and hockey."". However, multiple reliable sources indicate that Bob and Dave are the twins, not Dave and Peter.) According to Dave Barney, the recruiting coach saw the name "Barney" winning many races, but did not realize they were twin brothers. (Note: Fisher (2021) wrote, "After graduating Barney served for four years in the Korean War, and he played football and baseball at his college. He and his brother, Peter swam during their time there, and they both won their fair share of races. The swimming coach was recruiting at this time, and he saw the results of the intramural swim tournament in the local newspaper. According to Barney, the coach kept seeing "his name; Barney won this and Barney won that, Barney's all over the place". But he didn't realize "there were two of us". At this time, the coach gave both Dave and Peter a partial scholarship of books and tuition. They swam on the team, and both became captains". However, multiple reliable sources from 1957 to 1959 report that it was twin brothers Bob and Dave Barney swimming for the Lobos.) Barney was named an all-star Skyline Conference swimmer. The day prior to a competition, Barney consumed a three-pound (1.4 kg) roast then raced to a second-place finish in a 1,500 meters (1,600 yards) freestyle swimming event. The team's coach permitted the large meal, as Barney was the team's only entrant in the race.

Barney was a letterman for the Lobos baseball and swimming teams, earned a Bachelor of Science degree in physical education at UNM in 1959, and was named to the dean's honor roll.

=== Graduate student, coach and professor ===
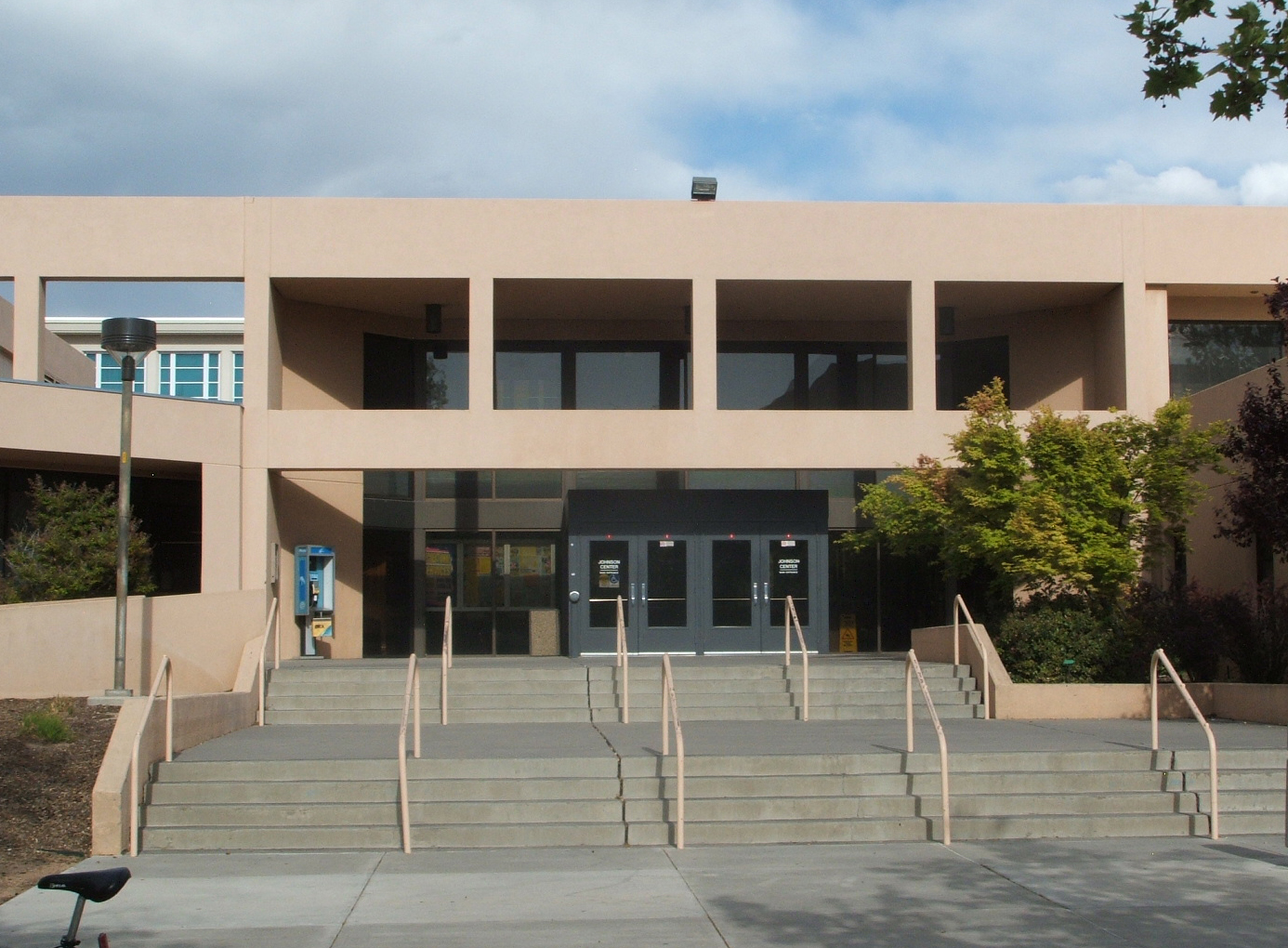
Johnson Gymnasium at University of New Mexico

As a graduate student, Barney was a part-time physical education instructor at UNM, and was a captain of the Lobos swimming team. Until 1962, Barney worked as the swimming director and head lifeguard at Albuquerque Country Club for five years; where he oversaw instruction for swimmers aged 8 to 16, and coached the synchronized swimming team. (Note: Positions held by Barney at the Albuquerque Country Club: Swimming director; Five-year tenure until 1962.; Head lifeguard; Instruction for swimmers aged 8 to 16; Coached the synchronized swimming team)

Barney combined the Albuquerque Country Club with programs of other pools in Albuquerque to form the Duke City Swim Club in 1959, to select swimmers to represent the city in state and national events sanctioned by the Amateur Athletic Union (AAU). Barney was subsequently named the AAU water polo commissioner for New Mexico, and oversaw the first annual state championships, held in 1960 at the Johnson Gymnasium Pool at UNM. He played for and coached the Los Federales water polo team, which included his brothers David and Peter; and competed in New Mexico AAU tournaments. Los Federales won a fourth consecutive New Mexico state amateur water polo championship in 1964.

In 1962, Barney was named head coach of the Lobos swimming team, his first full-time professional coaching position. UNM joined the Western Athletic Conference at the same, which increased scholarships available to swimmers. Barney focused recruiting efforts in the Midwest United States, aiming for the best results in the team's history. He subsequently coached the Lobos swimming team to seven winning seasons. Barney led the Lobos to 13 wins and one loss during the 1964–65 season, the team's best result in their history. Their only loss was to the defending Western Athletic Conference champion, the Utah Utes.

Barney was a New Mexico state delegate to the AAU convention, and sat on the national water polo committee. Due to disagreements between the AAU and the National Collegiate Athletic Association, AAU events could no longer be hosted at UNM. Despite this, Barney remained involved in amateur swimming beyond the university. He was elected vice-president of the Duke City Aquatic Association in 1963, and arranged AAU-sanctioned events and indoor high school state championship swim meets, and was the AAU director in charge of the 1964 junior national women's water polo championships held in Albuquerque. Barney was also a referee and starter for high school and club swim meets, and the meet director for the 11th annual New Mexico state high school swimming championships held at the Johnson Gym Pool in 1966.

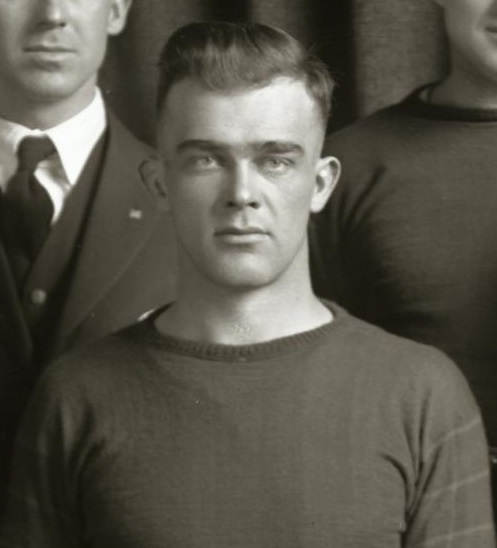
Roy W. Johnson

Researching a long-time UNM coach and athletic director, Barney authored The Roy W. Johnson Biography, as part of his master's degree thesis published in November 1963. Barney earned a Master of Science degree from UNM in 1964, followed by a Doctor of Philosophy degree in 1968, in curriculum and instruction. His doctorate dissertation, Turmoil and Triumph – A Narrative History of Intercollegiate Athletics at the University of New Mexico and its Implication in the Social History of Albuquerque — 1889–1950, was a history of New Mexico sports.

After completing a doctorate degree, Barney was a professor of physical education at UNM. When denied academic tenure in 1969, he accepted an academic physical education position at Sacramento State College for the 1969–70 school year. He was subsequently an associate professor of physical education at Boston State College from 1970 to 1972. During 1972, he was a visiting graduate professor of American economic and social history at Rivier College, in New Hampshire.

== University of Western Ontario ==
=== Intercollegiate athletics director ===
Barney served as director of intercollegiate athletics at University of Western Ontario from 1972 to 1979, in the newly established Faculty of Physical Education. He succeeded football coach John P. Metras as the athletic director. During Barney's time as athletics director, the Western Mustangs football team increased from an all-time low of 200 season ticket subscribers in 1974, to an average attendance of 10,000 per game by 1977.

In October 1975, the Canadian Interuniversity Athletics Union (CIAU) suspended the Windsor Lancers from all sports for two years, for the use of an ineligible men's football player. Some older universities in the Ontario Universities Athletics Association (OUAA) suggested withdrawing from the CIAU, which had different player eligibility rules. Barney felt that the CIAU made a "play for real power over athletics in this country". In May 1976, the Windsor Star reported that Barney proposed realignment of schools at the 1976 OUAA general meeting, which "would bring together universities with similar philosophies towards athletics".

Due to decreasing enrollment, inflation and budget cuts as of 1978, Barney considered eliminating some sports from intercollegiate athletics. The university had 21 men's sports teams, and 17 women's teams at the time, and received less in government subsidies given on a per student basis. Barney stated that cuts to coaching staff were necessitated by the budget constraints.

As of July 1, 1979, Barney was succeeded as chairman intercollegiate athletics by Bob Eynon, varsity swimming coach of the Mustangs. Barney remained in the Faculty of Physical Education.

=== Professor and researcher ===
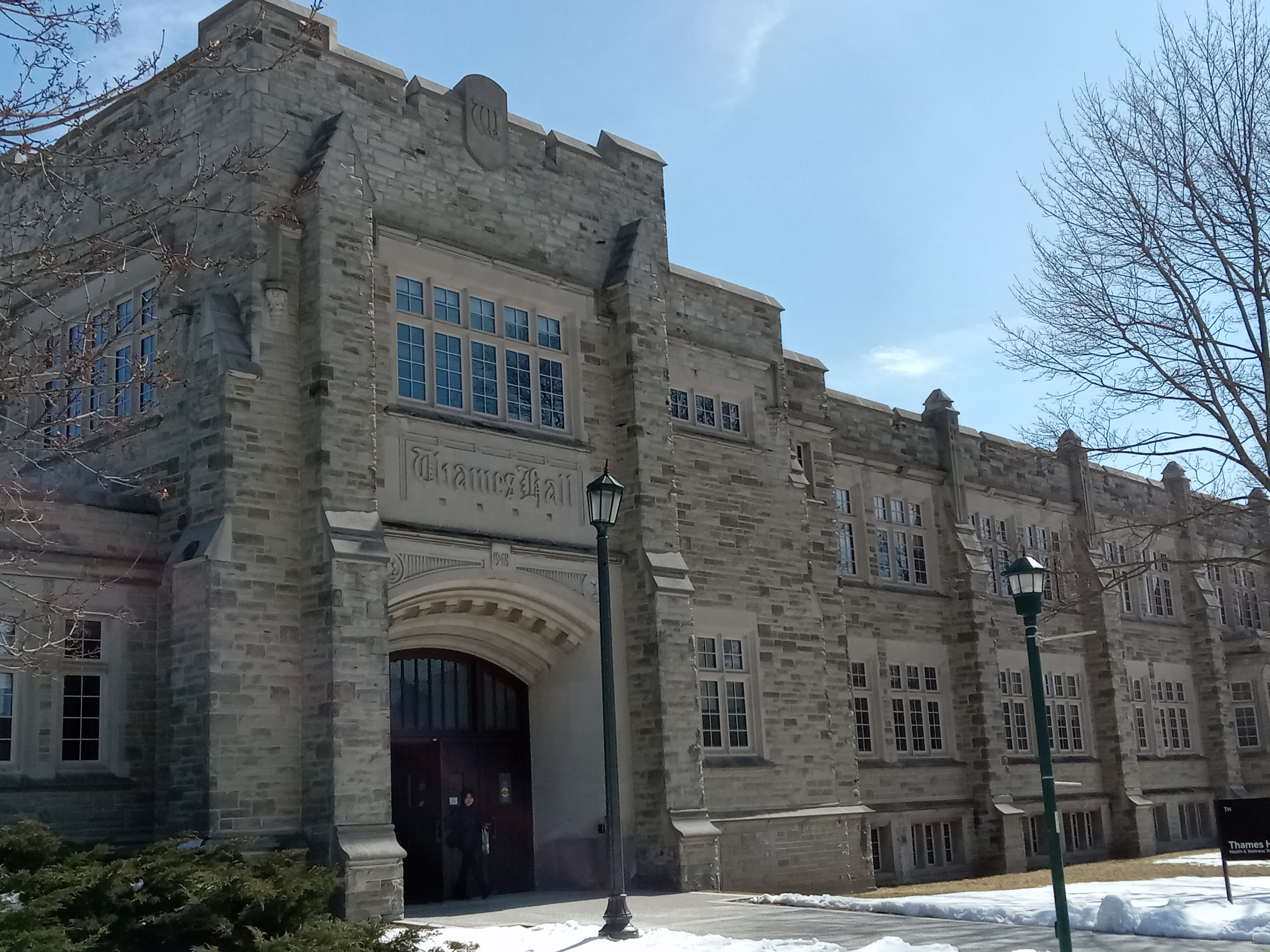
Thames Hall is home to the school of kinesiology at the University of Western Ontario.

Barney focused on teaching, writing and research as of 1979, as a professor in the Faculty of Physical Education. His research interests include the Olympic Games, baseball, American and British American history, and Turnvereine gymnastic clubs in the United States. He specialized in sport history in the school of kinesiology, and was named a professor emeritus in 1996. He continued to teach sport history courses in addition to his research, and supervising master's and doctorate student theses and dissertations. He authored the book, Mustangs 100: A Century of Western Athletics, published in 2013.

==== Olympic Games and sport ====
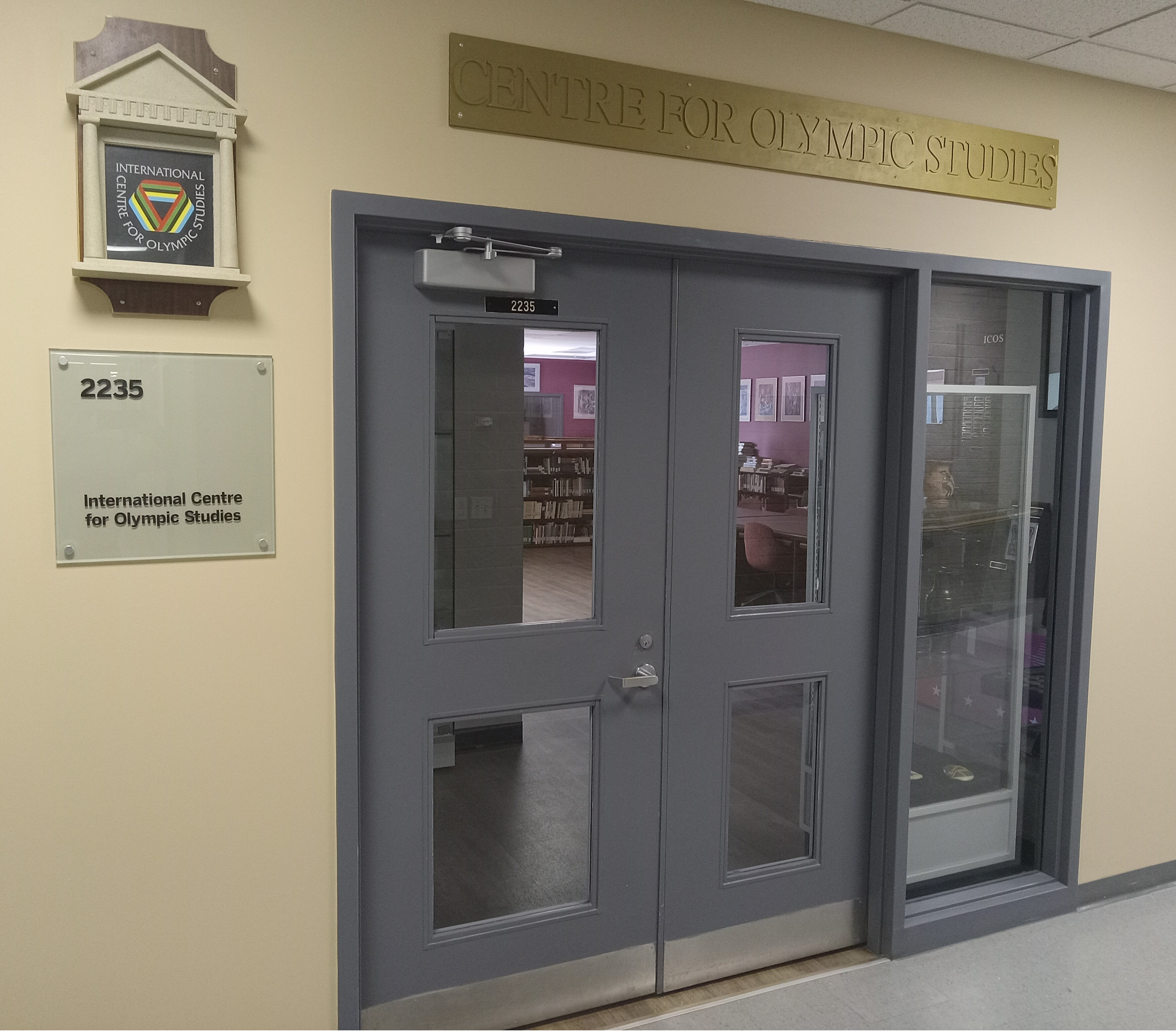
International Centre for Olympic Studies

Attending the 1984 Summer Olympics gave Barney inspiration for a scholarly institution to independently research the Olympic Games. His efforts resulted in the International Centre for Olympic Studies (ISOC), established at the University of Western Ontario in 1989, endeavoring to write about sociocultural impacts of the Olympic Games. According to Barney, until the early 1980s, only John Lucas from Pennsylvania State University studied the Olympics. Barney taught a summer course on the Olympics in 1984, before he founded the ISOC. He was the director of the ISOC from 1989 to 1998, was its co-director from 1998 to 2000, and interim director from 2007 to 2010. He felt that the Olympics "is worthy of study because it is one of the biggest meetings in a global context and has many political, economic, and other problems associated with it". He also noted the increase in security and commercialism with each Olympic Games he attended. He began Olympika in 1992, the first peer-reviewed academic journal focused on the Olympic Games. Also in 1992, Barney began the biannual International Symposium for Olympic Research.

Barney helped establish the North American Society for Sport History (NASSH), was its president from 1991 to 1993, and collaborated with the American Sports Literature Association to conduct an annual conference, including workshops and lectures open to the public. He was also an executive council member of the International Society of Olympic Historians from 1998 to 2008, an associate editor of the Journal of Olympic History, and managed 13 conferences and symposia hosted by the International Society of Olympic Historians. He was later chairman of the NASSH legacy committee for 2016 to 2024. His scholarly published works number more than 300 items as of 2023, including books, peer-reviewed articles, chapters in anthologies, reviews, abstracts, and proceedings papers.

In commenting about the 1999 Special Olympics World Summer Games which received more than half of its funding from private corporations, Barney stated "companies that donate millions might want say in how an event is run", but also felt it positive since "it brings the games to a much larger viewing audience". In July 2000, when the Los Angeles Times reported on the tangled nature of how the International Olympic Committee (IOC) redistributes profits from sponsorships and broadcasting rights, Barney stated that he had "yet to see matters of corruption in the IOC", but noted there were "matters of unaccountability". He later noted that when the spotlight is on the athletes, it has "the power to eclipse impressions of scandal or corruption", with respect to the Olympic bid process.

In 2000, Barney felt that Canada needed to specialize in the Olympics, rather than trying to be compete at too many sports. He also that felt that Canada's medal count at the 2000 Summer Olympics, was due to a lack of government funding, and poor planning to develop high performance athletes. In 2002, he advocated for mixed doubles curling to be added to the Winter Olympics. He argued that it was a sport without any "gender factor", and high television ratings; and noted that equestrian events at the Summer Olympics was the only Olympic sport allowing males and females to compete against each other. Mixed doubles curling made its debut at the 2018 Winter Olympics.

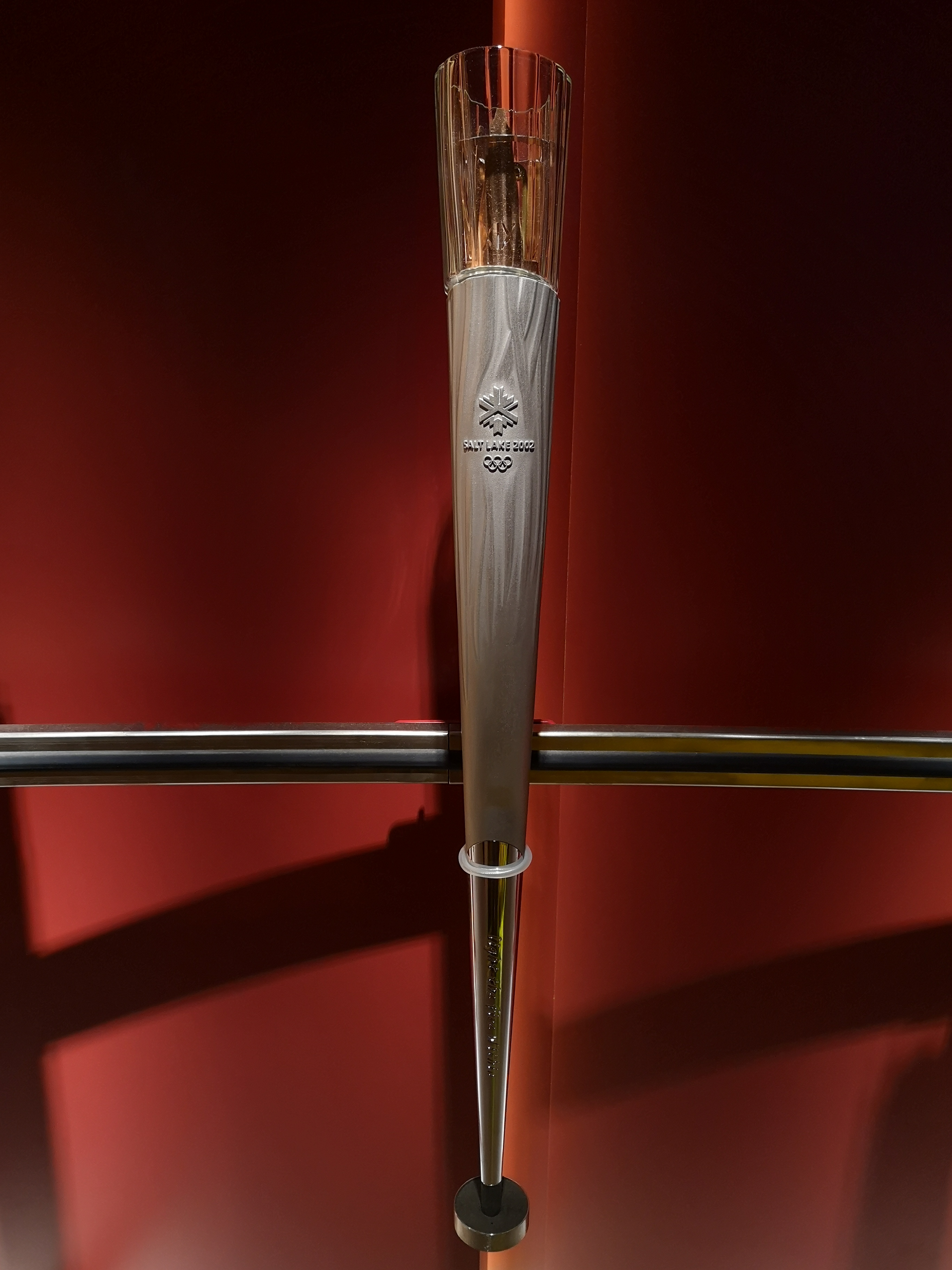
2002 Winter Olympic Games torch

Barney participated in a series of history lectures prior the 2002 Winter Olympics, where he spoke about Olympic symbols and commercialization. He co-authored the book Selling the Five Rings (2002), with Stephen Wenn and Scott Martyn, which discussed the history of corporate sponsorships and television rights for the Olympic Games. Barney argued that the Olympic torch had been commercialized since its inception in 1936, and that sponsors of the torch relay benefit from brand awareness; whereas the medal podium ceremonies which began in 1932, had not become commercialized since no advertising is allowed inside Olympic venues. He also stated that Olympic podiums were based on pedestals used at the 1930 British Empire Games proposed by Melville Marks Robinson, then implemented for the 1932 Winter Olympics.

In 2025, his final Olympic book was published, A Games Changer: The International Olympic Committee, Tokyo 2020, and COVID-19, co-authored with Stephen Wenn. Researching the book, they had a two-hour interview with IOC president Thomas Bach.

==== Baseball in Canada ====
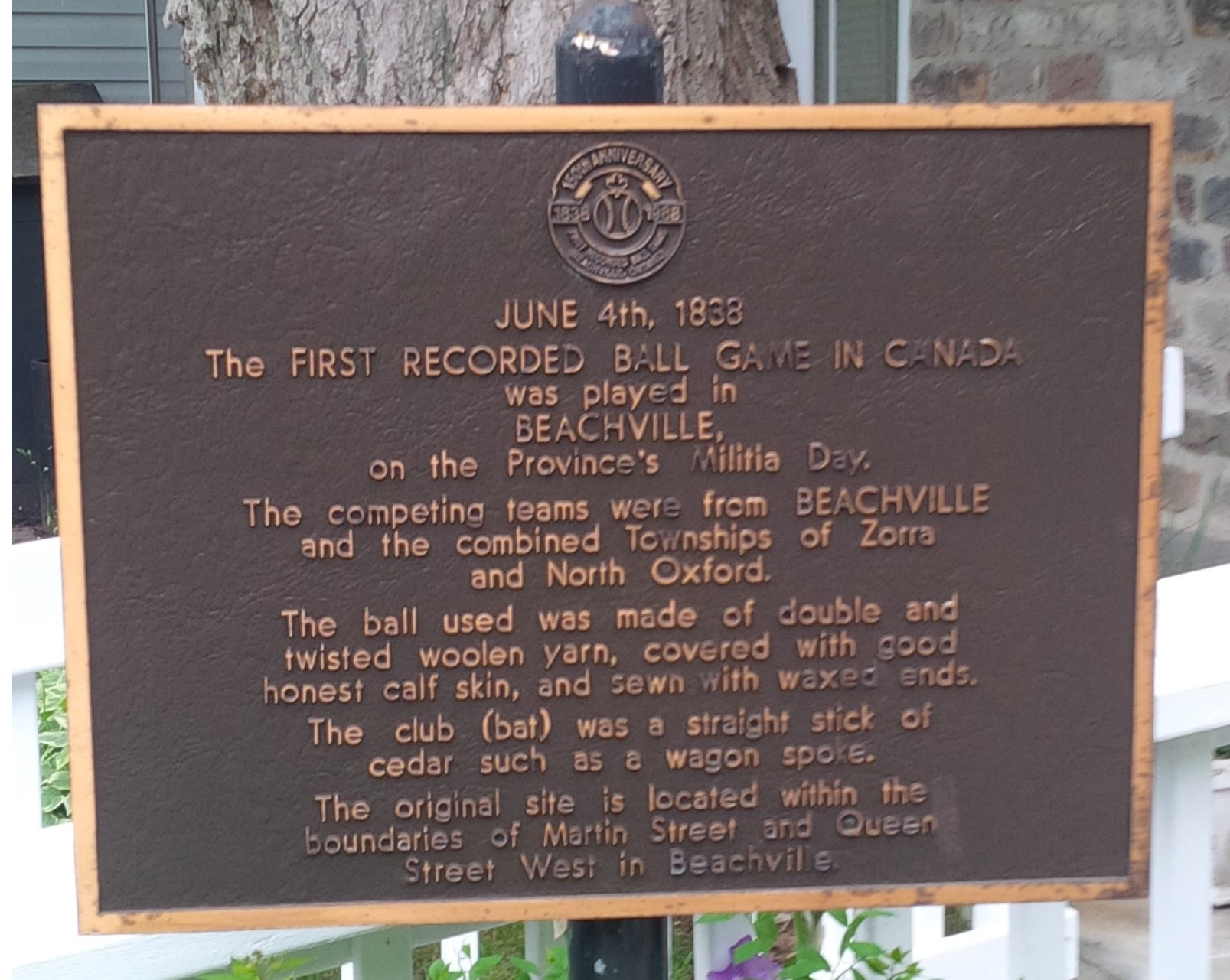
Plaque in Beachville commemorating the oldest verified baseball game played in Canada

Barney researched the oldest verified baseball game was in Canada, based on a letter from Adam Ford to the editor of Sporting Life, published on May 5, 1886. In the letter, Ford described in detail a game he witnessed on June 4, 1838, played in Beachville, Ontario. Assisted by graduate student Nancy Bouchier, Barney verified the names of participants and descriptions of the field; by researching tax forms, census records, maps, church records, and tombstones, and found that all of the participants and details in Ford's letter were correct.

The Journal of Sport History published Barney's findings in 1988. The Canadian claim to the oldest verified baseball game was subsequently recognized by the Canadian Baseball Hall of Fame, the National Baseball Hall of Fame and Museum in Cooperstown, New York, and a Canadian postage stamp in 1988. Barney opined that following the American Revolution, settlers in Southwestern Ontario brought their recreational activities. Ted Spencer, curator of the National Baseball Hall of Fame and Museum, and historian Tom Heitz, noted that records exist of earlier bat and ball games played in the United States that evolved into baseball, and agreed that American settlers in Canada likely brought the game with them.

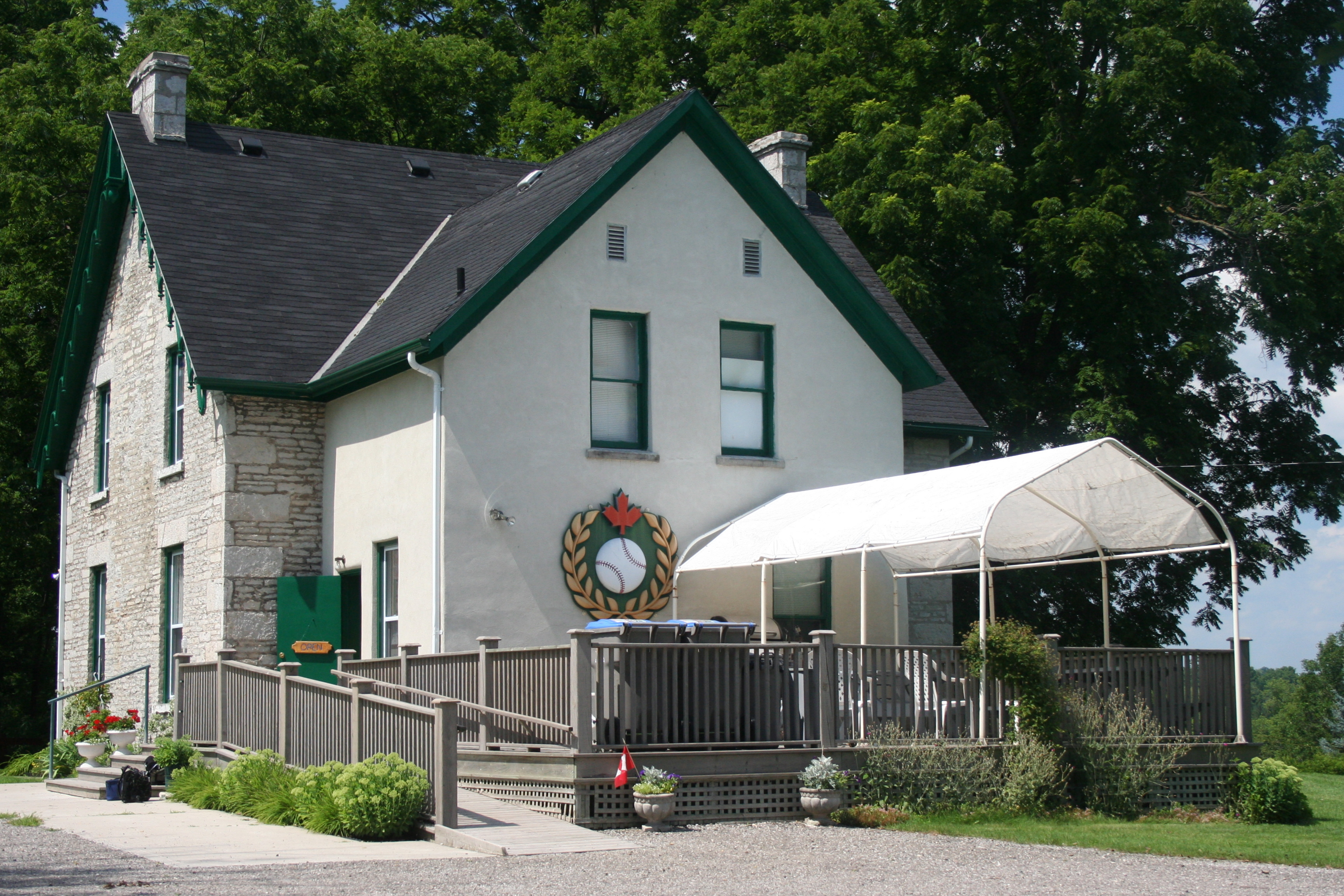
The Canadian Baseball Hall of Fame building, c. 2010

Barney served on the board of directors for the Canadian Baseball Hall of Fame during the 1990s, and wrote a historical study which advocated for relocating the hall of fame from Toronto to St. Marys, Ontario, in 1995. He also served on the editorial review board of Nine: A Journal of Baseball History and Social Policy Perspectives, and was chairman of the induction selection committee of the Canadian Baseball Hall of Fame. He was the leading historian on the "History of Baseball Tour" in summer 1995, which visited Beachville, Labatt Park, St. Marys, the National Baseball Hall of Fame and Museum, and historical baseball sites in New York City and Boston.

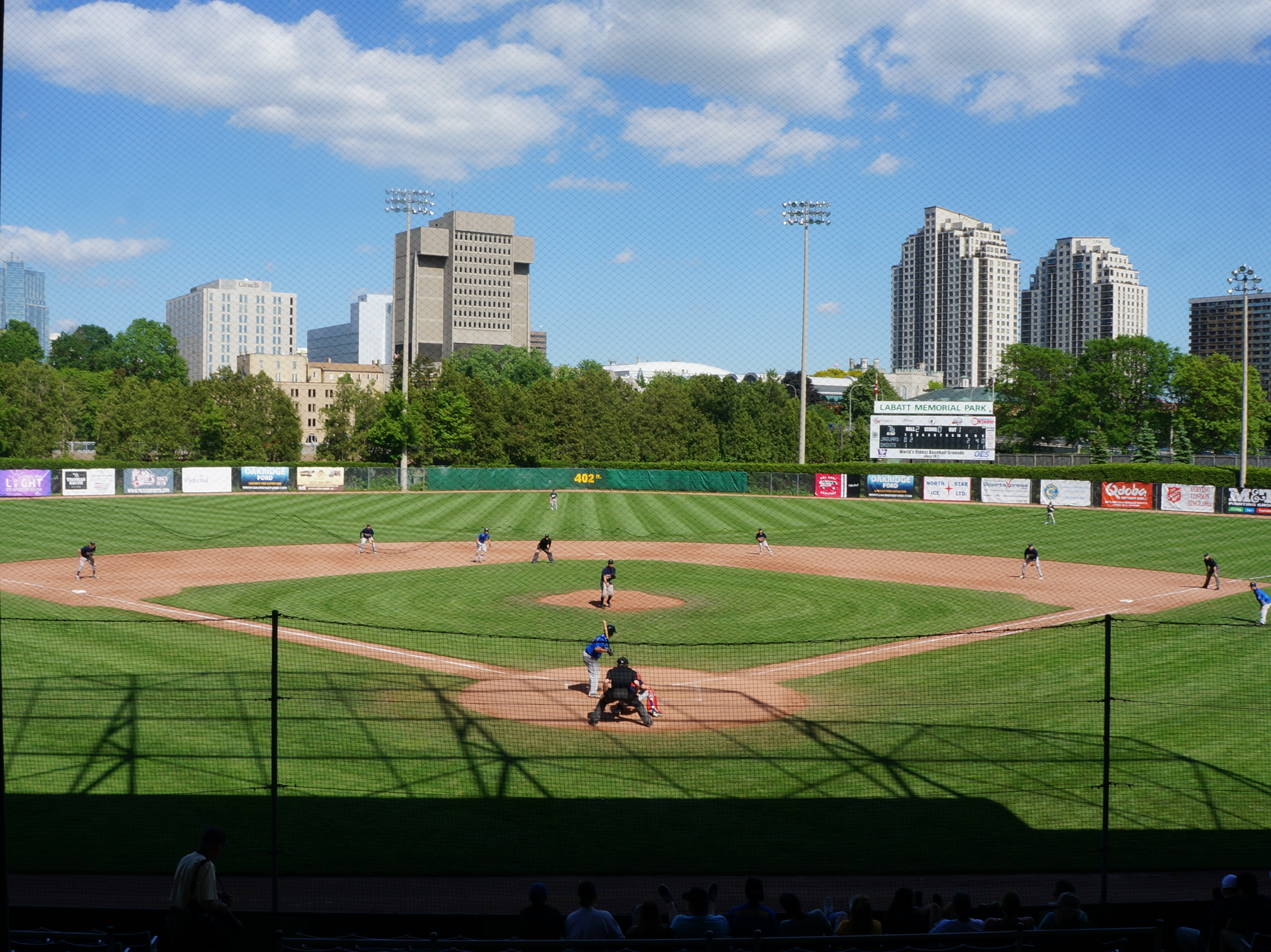
Labatt Park

In 2021, Barney was appointed to a steering committee for an application by London, Ontario, for Labatt Park to be granted national heritage site distinction. The park was previously made an Ontario heritage site in 1994. Barney and graduate student Riley Nowokowski began investigating the history of Labatt Park, following an American challenge to its claim as baseball's "oldest and continuously operated" park. Barney and Nowokowski spent three years researching 143 years of the park's history, with their article: "A Canadian National Treasure: Tecumseh/Labatt Memorial Park, Baseball History's Oldest, Continuously-Operating Ballpark", published in the Fall 2021 issue of Ontario History.

== Honors and awards ==
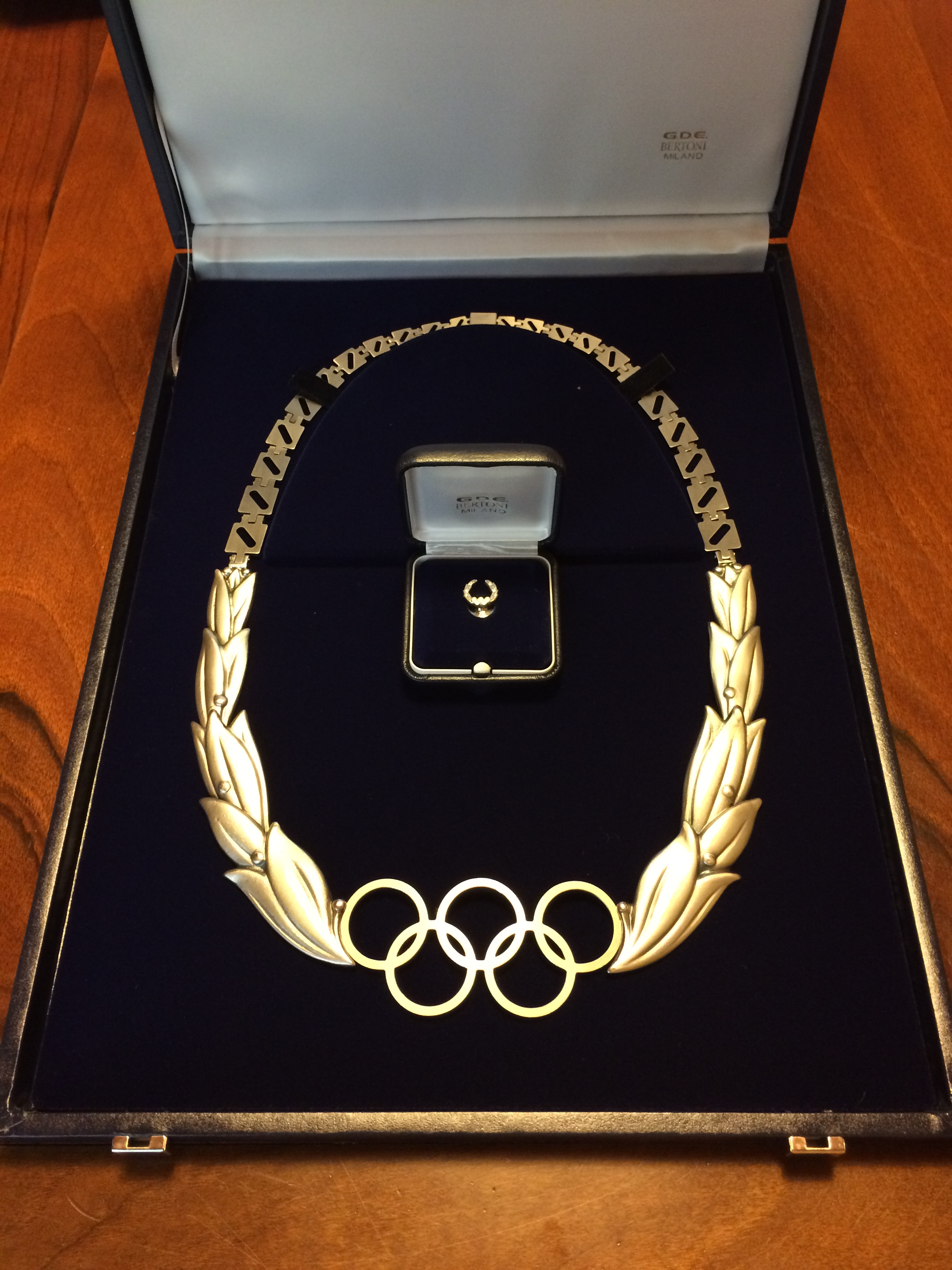
Olympic Order chain and medallion

Barney has received multiple honors from the University of Western Ontario, including the Edward G. Pleva Award for excellence in teaching in 1985. He received an honorary Doctor of Laws degree on June 17, 2014, and gave that year's convocation address, titled "The Fruits of Your Roots". He was inducted into the John P. Metras Sports Museum in 2019, the hall of fame for the Western Mustangs. In 2022, the Robert Knight Barney Lecture Series was named for him, hosted by the International Centre for Olympic Studies. In 2023, Barney received a lifetime achievement award from the Western Mustang Athletics Association.

The IOC bestowed the Olympic Order upon Barney in July 1997, for his work in establishing the International Centre for Olympic Studies and the journal Olympika. He received the NASSH recognition award in 2003, for his book Selling the Five Rings. The Chicago Tribune wrote that his book was "an important contribution to understanding the modern leviathan of sports". He received the International Society of Olympic Historians' Pierre de Coubertin Award in 2009 for "lifetime achievements in advancing Olympic scholarship".

In 2017, Barney received the NASSH Service Award for lifetime contributions to the society. He was also named an honorary fellow to the European Committee for Sports History. In 2019, California State University, Fullerton, established the Robert Knight Barney Graduate Student Essay Award at the Center for Sociocultural Sport and Olympic Research (CSSOR), given annually for original research on the Olympic Games. In 2020, Barney received the Distinguished Leadership Award from the CSSOR.

Other recognition for Barney includes induction into the UNM Alumni Lettermen's Hall of Fame in 2002, induction into the Hall of Honor for the New Mexico Lobos in 2014; and the Riddell Award from the Ontario Historical Society for his article on Labatt Park written with Riley Nowokowski in 2021.

== Personal life ==
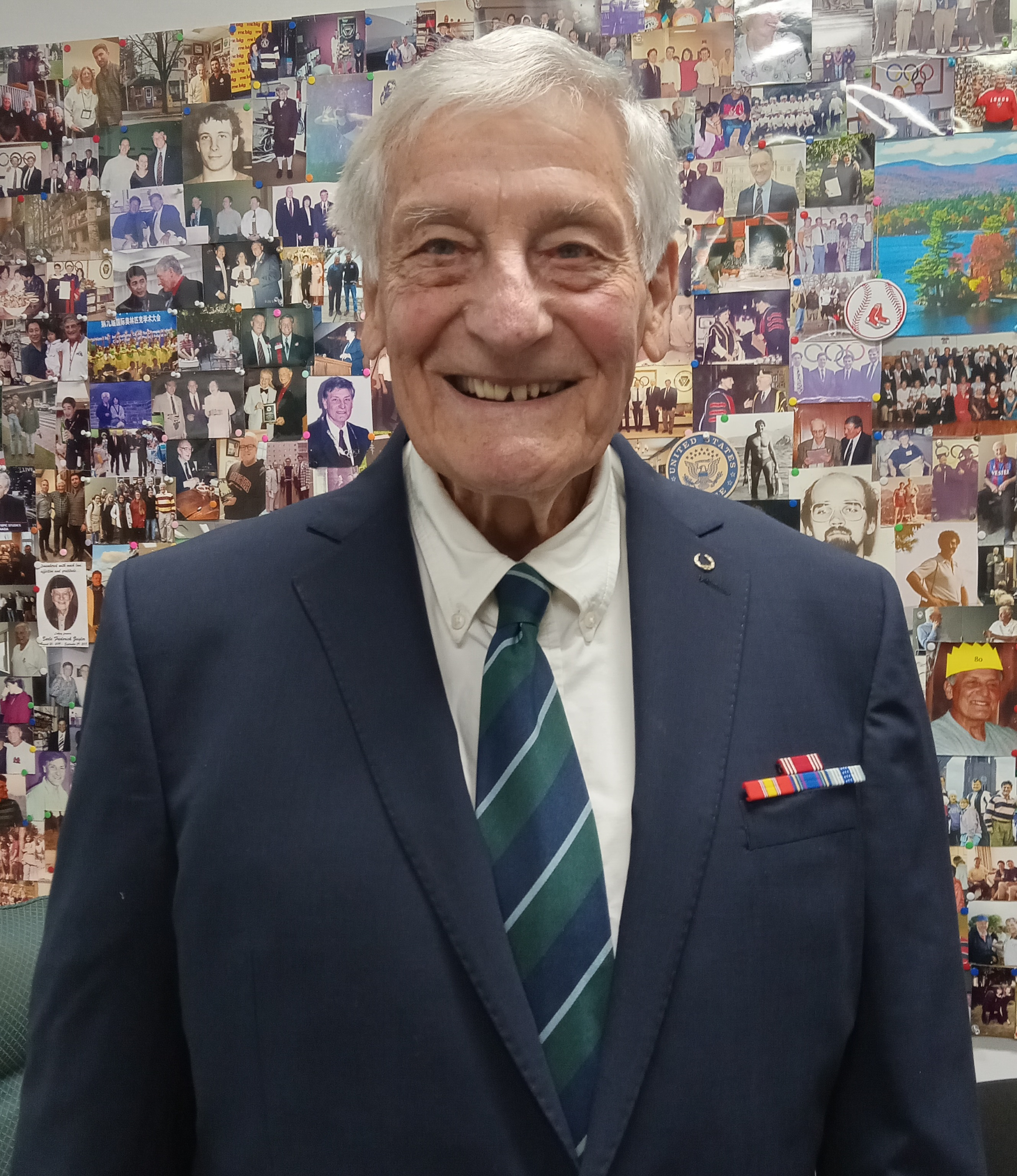
Barney in 2025

Barney and his brother Dave played football at UNM during their freshman year. After military service, they both played baseball and swam on the UNM varsity teams. Together, they also played semi-professional hockey in the Sandia Mountain Hockey League, with Barney as vice-president of the league during the 1957–58 season. All three Barney brothers became educators, with Dave teaching English at the university, and as a swim and track coach at Albuquerque Academy. Their younger brother Peter served in the United States Navy, also attended UNM, and was a director of physical education at Albuquerque Academy.

As a graduate student, Barney worked for the Albuquerque Journal by servicing local news distributors. He has been married twice, and retains American citizenship while working in Canada. He resides in London, Ontario, and is a lifelong fan of the Boston Red Sox. Other interests include classical music, The New York Times crossword, and historical biographies. Barney attended each Olympics from 1976, until not visiting Italy for the 2026 Games.
