= Balboa High School =

Balboa High School may refer to:

- Balboa High School (Balboa, Virginia) in Balboa, Virginia
- Balboa High School (Panama), a public high school in the former Panama Canal Zone, closed 1999
- Balboa High School (San Francisco, California) in San Francisco, California
