= Dave Barney =

American educator and swimming coach (born 1932)

- Born: January 5, 1932 (age 94); Winthrop, Massachusetts, US
- Education: University of New Mexico
- Occupations: Educator; sport coach
- Years active: 1960–2021
- Known for: Albuquerque Academy swimming coach
- Family: Bob Barney (brother)
- Awards: New Mexico Sports Hall of Fame (1995); National High School Hall of Fame (2015)

David Ellsworth Barney (born January 5, 1932) is an American educator and swimming coach. In 1967, he was named head of the senior school at Albuquerque Academy, where he coached the track and field team, and taught sixth-grade English. He established a swimming program for girls at the academy in 1975, then coached both the girls and boys in swimming from 1982 until his retirement in 2021. He won 42 state championships for the academy—21 with the boys and 21 with the girls—and coached more than 400 students named All-Americans in either athletics and academics. Prior working at the academy, Barney began coaching sports and teaching at Cranbrook School in 1960, and was the aquatic sports director at the Albuquerque Country Club.

Alongside his older twin brother Bob, Barney played multiple varsity sports at University of New Mexico (UNM), and served in the United States Air Force during the Korean conflict. He was named New Mexico State swim coach of the year in 28 seasons, and was the inaugural girls swimming coach of the year chosen by the National Federation of State High School Associations in 1995. He has been inducted into multiple halls of fame, including the New Mexico Sports Hall of Fame, the UNM Athletic Hall of Honor, and the National High School Hall of Fame.

== Early life and education ==
David Ellsworth Barney was born on January 5, 1932, in Winthrop, Massachusetts. (Note: Biographical information: Full name: David Ellsworth Barney; Barney was reported to have his 75th birthday on January 5, 2007, and his 83rd birthday on January 5, 2015, both indicating that he was born on January 5, 1932.; His twin brother Bob Barney, was born in Winthrop, Massachusetts.) (Note: Multiple sources report Bob Barney and Dave Barney as twin brothers, although one source mistakenly lists Dave and Peter as twins, instead of Bob and Dave.) His father Robert S. Barney, was a colonel in the United States Air Force (USAF), and a veteran of World War II and the Korean War. His mother Blanche Geraldine Barney, was a descendant from the youngest passenger of the 1620 voyage by the Mayflower, and a soldier who served in the American Revolutionary War.

Barney is the younger of mirror image twins to his brother, Bob. As children, they played baseball and swam at the family's summer home on Newfound Lake near Bristol, New Hampshire. As a youth, Barney aspired to become a boxer, the shortstop for the Boston Red Sox, or play gridiron football as a running back.

Due to his father's military service, Barney lived in multiple places as a youth, including Rochester, New Hampshire, Lake Charles, Louisiana, Biloxi, Mississippi, the island of Guam, and the Panama Canal Zone. The Barneys attended six elementary schools across the United States, and seven high schools around the world, including Spaulding High School, Biloxi High School, Aurora High School, George Washington High School, and Balboa High School. While living in Mississippi, he and Bob reached the state tennis doubles semifinals and first became involved in swimming and water polo while living in Panama. (Note: Krider (2014) wrote, "At one time or another they competed in football, baseball, hockey, softball, boxing and tennis. He and Peter, with no experience, once made the state tennis doubles semifinals in Mississippi.", and "His first taste of swimming came during his senior year in Panama, when tried water polo for eight weeks." However, multiple reliable sources indicate that Bob and Dave are the twins, not Dave and Peter.) In 1949, he graduated from Balboa High School in Panama.

Barney enrolled at University of New Mexico (UNM) to play football for the New Mexico Lobos in 1950. Placing school on hold, he served with the USAF during the Korean conflict from 1951 to 1955. He returned to university in 1955, playing football with assistance from the a G.I. Bill, in addition to the baseball and swim teams. During the summer, he instructed at Albuquerque YMCA learn-to-swim clinics. Barney and his brother Bob participated in intramural sports, won multiple swimming events, and were offered a scholarship for books and tuition to join the Lobos swimming team in 1957. (Note: Krider (2014) wrote, "The University of New Mexico built a six-lane pool in 1957 and hired a coach from Denver who immediately began searching for swimmers. As Barney put it, "My brother and I had cleaned up in intramural swimming and he offered us tuition and books. We swam for two years. We still were playing baseball and hockey."". However, multiple reliable sources indicate that Bob and Dave are the twins, not Dave and Peter.) According to Barney, the recruiting coach saw the name "Barney" winning many races, but did not realize they were twin brothers. (Note: Fisher (2021) wrote, "After graduating Barney served for four years in the Korean War, and he played football and baseball at his college. He and his brother, Peter swam during their time there, and they both won their fair share of races. The swimming coach was recruiting at this time, and he saw the results of the intramural swim tournament in the local newspaper. According to Barney, the coach kept seeing “his name; Barney won this and Barney won that, Barney’s all over the place.” But he didn’t realize “there were two of us.” At this time, the coach gave both Dave and Peter a partial scholarship of books and tuition. They swam on the team, and both became captains." However, multiple reliable sources from 1957 to 1959 report that it was twin brothers Bob and Dave Barney swimming for the Lobos.) Lobos' coach Johnny Williams, named the Barney twins lettermen in swimming in 1958. In 1959, Barney was a captain of the Lobos swimming team. He and his brother Bob both earned a Bachelor of Science degree in physical education at UNM in 1959. Barney subsequently earned a master's degree from UNM.

== Coaching and teaching career ==
Barney began his coaching career in 1960. For six years, he taught at Cranbrook School in Bloomfield Hills, Michigan, where he taught English and physical education. He was also an assistant coach for football, and the head coach for ice hockey and baseball at Cranbrook. He coached at the Albuquerque Country Club during summers, after succeeding his brother Bob as the aquatic sports director. In six years, Barney grew the country aquatics team from 25 to more than 200 members.

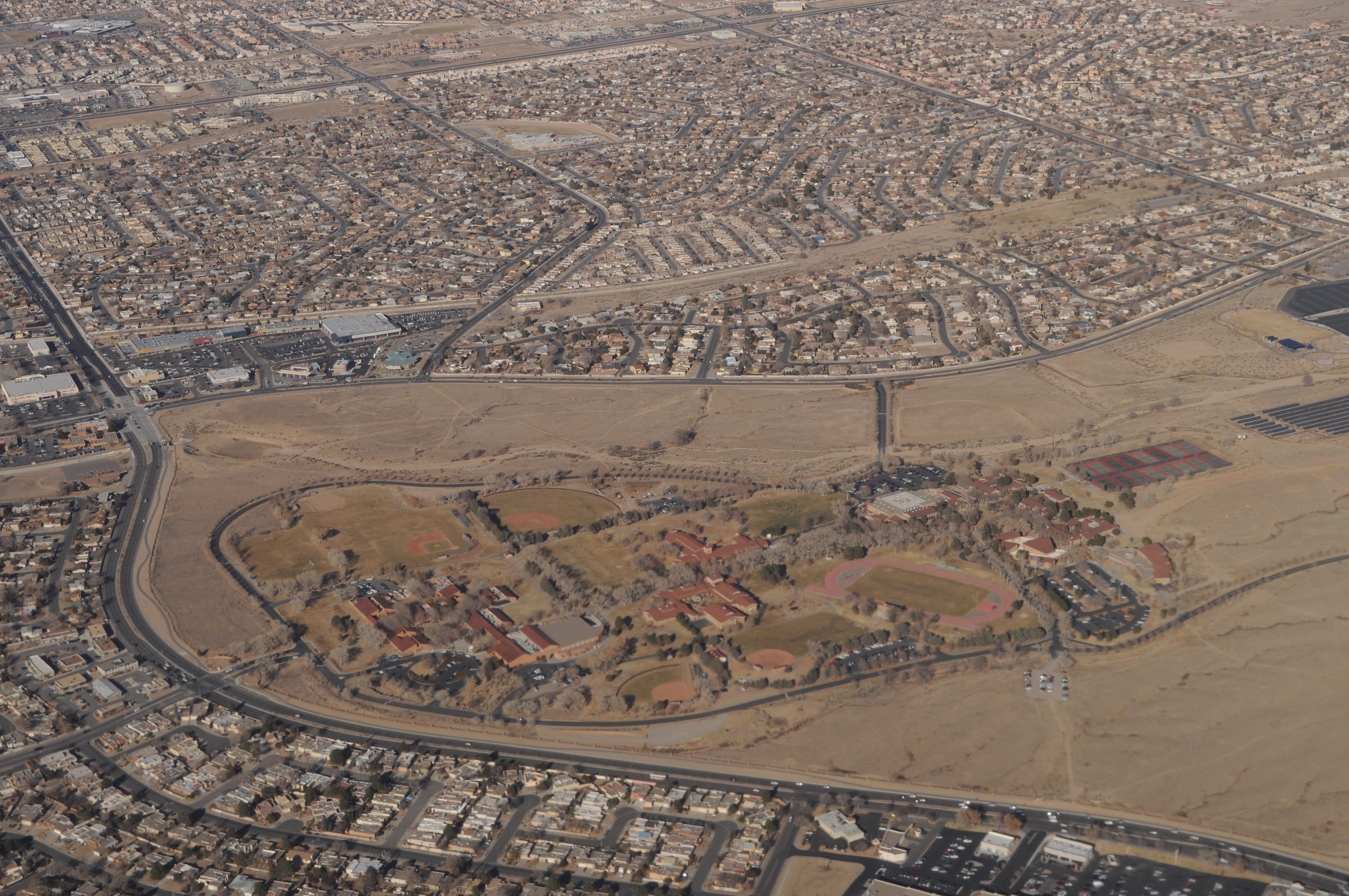
Albuquerque Academy aerial view

In 1967, Barney was named head of the senior school at Albuquerque Academy, and coached the track and field team for nine years. His teaching duties included sixth-grade English and creative writing. When the academy became co-educational in 1973, Barney felt that the girls made "a significant impact on the school in terms of, they brought a certain sense of civility to the school that was not present before".

Barney established a swimming program for girls at the academy in 1975, while his younger brother Peter coached the boys' program. After his brother's death in 1982, Barney coached both teams. In 1983, he achieved his first state championship with the girls, then won with both championships with the boys and girls in 1986. He also played a leading role in establishing the Sundance Aquatic Association, New Mexico's largest summer swim club program.

Retiring from teaching in 1995, Barney continued to coach swimming. He then designed the new pool installed at Albuquerque Academy, and subsequently designed five additional pools in the Albuquerque region. He spent 10 months working on designs for the pool at Albuquerque Academy, later known as the "David E. Barney and Peter B. Barney Competition Pool".

As of 2015, Barney's swim teams had set or held 70 New Mexico state records. He also coached five champions of the National Interscholastic Swim Coaches Association. When Barney announced his upcoming retirement, he had won 41 state championships with Albuquerque Academy—21 with the boys and 20 with the girls. He had coached more than 400 students named All-Americans in either athletics and academics, and won more than 260 individual events and relays at the state championships. His teams won 1,236 swim competitions, and failed to finish in first place at only 77 competitions. His final coaching appearance at the state championships resulted in his 21st title with the girls, and 42nd overall in his career.

Barney attributes success to his coaching strategy, which avoided "over-training", included a ten-day break at Christmas, and a sprint-specific focus on distances less than 1,000 yards (910 m) in the ten days prior to a state championship. He felt what mattered more than success, was "the human interaction between a coach and an athlete, and that friendship extends long after kids graduate high school and go on to college". He retired at the end of the 2020–21 season, and was succeeded as swimming coach at Albuquerque Academy by his assistant of the last two seasons, John Butcher.

== Honors and awards ==
The New Mexico High School Coaches Association named Barney a coach of the year for swimming and diving in 1990, 1995, and 2009. He has been named New Mexico State swim coach of the year in 28 seasons, and was the inaugural girls swimming coach of the year chosen by the National Federation of State High School Associations in 1995. In 2018, he received the National Collegiate and Scholastic Swimming Trophy from the National Interscholastic Swimming Coaches Association for "contribution to swimming as a competitive sport".

Barney has been inducted into multiple halls of fame, including the New Mexico Sports Hall of Fame in 1995, the UNM Athletic Hall of Honor in 2000, (Note: Sometimes known as the New Mexico Lobos Hall of Honor) and the New Mexico High School Coaches Association Hall of Fame in 2009. In 2010, he was inducted into the New Mexico Activities Association's Hall of Fame, the first swim coach to receive the honor. He was inducted into the National Interscholastic Swim Coaches Association Hall of Fame in 2013, and into the National High School Hall of Fame in 2015, only the third swimming coach to be recognized at the time. In 2022, he was inducted into the Albuquerque Academy Sports Hall of Fame.

== Personal life ==
Barney and his brothers served in the military, before careers in coaching and teaching. His brother Bob also served in the USAF during the Korean conflict, and later became a professor of sports history at University of Western Ontario. Their younger brother Peter served in the United States Navy, before working at Albuquerque Academy. Barney and his brother Bob were baseball teammates in university, and in semi-professional ice hockey. Barney played as a winger for the Kirtland Air Force Base Flyers in the Sandia Mountain Hockey League. Barney played water polo for the Los Federales team in the early 1960s, which included his brother Peter as a teammate, and his brother Bob as the coach. Los Federales won a fourth consecutive Amateur Athletic Union state water polo championship for New Mexico in 1964.

During university, Barney married Jeanne, and had children as of 1967. He also worked part-time delivering 500 newspapers each morning, and delivered mail during Christmas holidays. He listens to classical music, has taught sailing classes in the summer, and owns a Herreshoff 12½ keelboat. In his spare time, he is a poet, essayist and memoirist. He and his brother Bob have toured giving lectures on sports history, including the development of water polo, and history of the Boston Red Sox.
