= Spaulding High School (New Hampshire) =

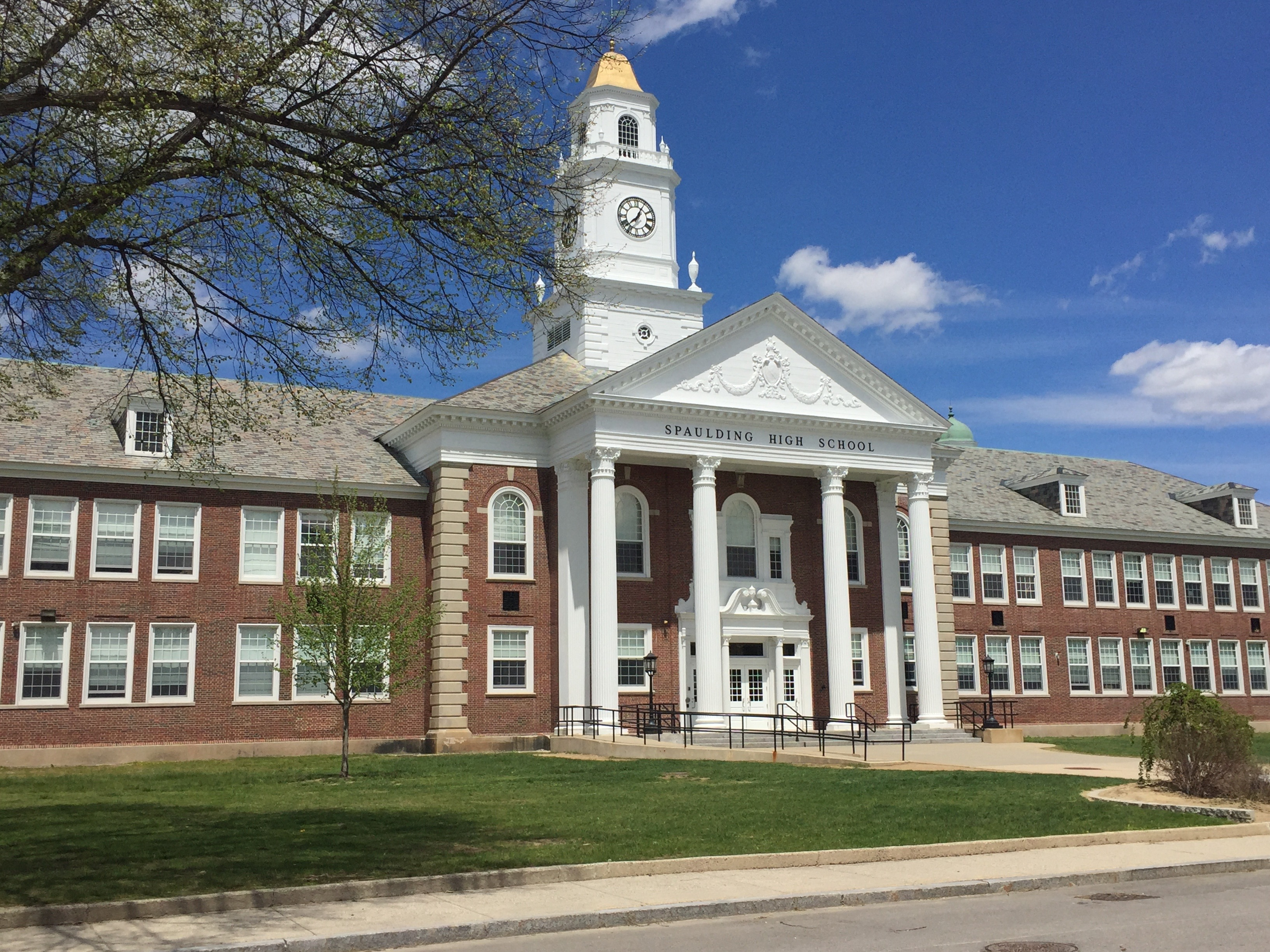

Location
- 130 Wakefield Street; Rochester, New Hampshire; United States; 43°18′47″N 70°58′43″W

Information
- Type: Public
- Established: 1939
- School district: Rochester School District
- NCES School ID: 330594000394
- Faculty: 106.00 (on FTE basis)
- Grades: 9 to 12
- Enrollment: 1,385 (2017-18)
- Student to teacher ratio: 13.07
- Colors: Scarlet and white
- Nickname: Red Raiders
- Website: www.rochesterschools.com/o/shs

Spaulding High School is a public co-educational high school in Rochester, New Hampshire, United States. It is part of the city of Rochester School District and is located at 130 Wakefield Street. Spaulding High School was built in 1939, and the addition of the Richard W. Creteau Center was completed in 1990. Along with the addition in 1990, the original building was extensively renovated.

The school has a student population of more than 1,500 students in grades 9–12. Students are offered a broad curriculum, with a strong focus on high academic standards in all areas. Academics are complemented by a full range of extracurricular activities including drama, sports, music, and vocational clubs and planned social events.

Spaulding is accredited by the New England Association of Schools and Colleges and is approved by the New Hampshire Department of Education.

Spaulding's mascot is the Red Raider. In 2015 the mascot came under public scrutiny for being an offensive portrayal of Native Americans, and in 2020 the Rochester-based group Allies United for Change urged the high school to change the mascot.

== Notable alumni ==
- Bob Barney, academic and sports historian
- Dave Barney, educator and swimming coach
- Sam Farrington, politician and farmer
