= Tim Jones (American football) =

American football player (born 1998)

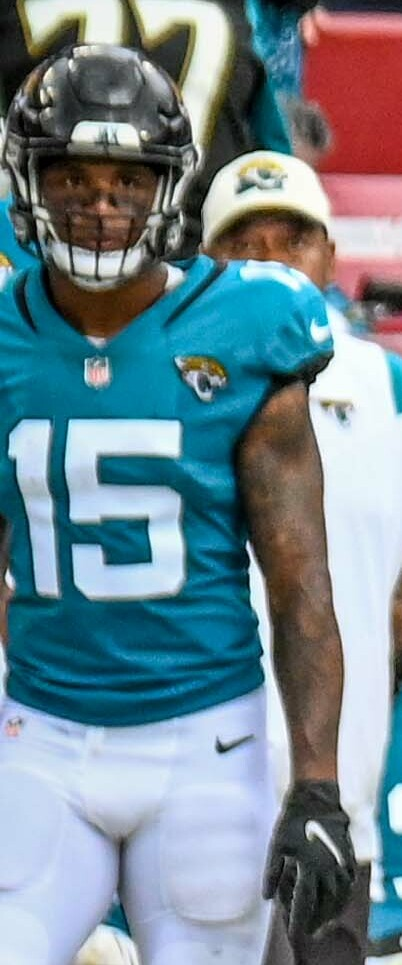
- Jones in 2022

No. 13 – Jacksonville Jaguars
- Position: Wide receiver
- Roster status: Practice squad

Personal information
- Born: May 15, 1998 (age 28); Biloxi, Mississippi, U.S.
- Listed height: 6 ft 1 in (1.85 m)
- Listed weight: 200 lb (91 kg)

Career information
- High school: Biloxi
- College: Southern Miss (2017–2020)
- NFL draft: 2021: undrafted

Career history
- Jacksonville Jaguars (2021–2024); Minnesota Vikings (2025); Jacksonville Jaguars (2025–present)

Career NFL statistics as of 2025
- Receptions: 18
- Receiving yards: 169
- Stats at Pro Football Reference

Tim Jones (born May 15, 1998) is an American professional football wide receiver for the Jacksonville Jaguars of the National Football League (NFL). He played college football for the Southern Mississippi Golden Eagles.

== Early life ==
Jones attended Biloxi High School in Biloxi, Mississippi. A 3-star recruit, he committed to Southern Mississippi to play college football in 2016. He chose Southern Mississippi over Louisiana, Memphis, and Texas-San Antonio.

== College career ==
Jones played at Southern Mississippi from 2017 to 2020. During his career he had 150 receptions, 2,011 receiving yards, and nine touchdowns in 34 games. After his senior season in 2020, he entered the 2021 NFL draft.

== Professional career ==
Pre-draft measurables
Height	Weight	Arm length	Hand span	Wingspan	40-yard dash	10-yard split	20-yard split	20-yard shuttle	Three-cone drill	Vertical jump	Broad jump	Bench press
6 ft 0 3/4 in (1.85 m)	203 lb (92 kg)	31 3/8 in (0.80 m)	9 1/2 in (0.24 m)	6 ft 4 1/8 in (1.93 m)	4.45 s	1.62 s	2.57 s	4.14 s	7.02 s	40.0 in (1.02 m)	10 ft 4 in (3.15 m)	17 reps
All values from Southern Mississippi's Pro Day

=== Jacksonville Jaguars ===
On May 3, 2021, Jones signed with the Jacksonville Jaguars as an undrafted free agent following the 2021 NFL draft. On August 27, Jones was waived by the Jaguars with an injury settlement. On September 27, he was re–signed to the Jaguars’ practice squad, where he would spend the season.

On January 10, 2022, Jones signed a reserve/future contract with the Jaguars. On August 30, after the final roster cutdown of the preseason, Jones made Jacksonville's 53-man roster entering the regular season.

=== Minnesota Vikings ===
On March 19, 2025, Jones signed with the Minnesota Vikings. He was released on August 27 and re-signed to the practice squad the same day. On September 11, Jones was signed to the active roster. He was released on September 23 and re-signed to the practice squad the next day. Jones was released from the practice squad on September 30.

=== Jacksonville Jaguars (second stint) ===
On October 7, 2025, Jones signed with the Jacksonville Jaguars' practice squad. Jones was elevated to the Jaguars' active roster for the team's Week 9 game against the Las Vegas Raiders, catching one pass for 15 yards in the 30–29 win. After the game he reverted to the practice squad.

Jones signed a reserve/future contract with Jacksonville on January 12, 2026. On August 30, Jones was released by Jacksonville as a part of final roster cuts; he was re-signed to the team's practice squad the next day.
