= New Mexico Sports Hall of Fame =

The New Mexico Sports Hall of Fame is a sports hall of fame in the U.S. state of New Mexico. The hall's mission statement states its purpose is "To induct into the Hall of Fame those athletes, coaches, teams or any other individuals who have had significant careers, achieving high standards of athletic success and/or made contributions to sports, thereby bestowing fame and honor to the state of New Mexico. It was first founded in 1973 as the Albuquerque Sports Hall of Fame, and honored those from the Albuquerque region until expanding in 2005 to include other areas of the state. In 2014 the hall assumed its current name.

== Notable inductees ==
Academy swimming coach Dave Barney was inducted in 1995.

The 2015 class of inductees included college baseball coach Ray Birmingham; Olympic discus thrower Carla Garrett; Duke University track and field athlete Curtis Beach; basketball players Sam Lacey and Luc Longley; high school football coach Eric Roanhaus; high school basketball coach Marv Sanders; sportscaster Henry Tafoya; and high school volleyball coach Flo Valdez.

Inducted in the 2016 class were multi-sport athlete and coach Adam Kedge; horse jockey Charmayne James; baseball pitcher Frank Castillo; American football coach Marv Levy; basketball player Danny Granger; baseball coach Jim Johns; and baseball outfielder Cody Ross.
