= Michael Coats Jr. =

American football player (born 2001)

No. 39 – Cleveland Browns
- Position: Cornerback
- Roster status: Practice squad

Personal information
- Born: June 20, 2001 (age 25); Louisville, Mississippi, U.S.
- Listed height: 5 ft 9 in (1.75 m)
- Listed weight: 184 lb (83 kg)

Career information
- High school: Biloxi (Biloxi, Mississippi)
- College: East Central CC (2020–2022); Nevada (2023–2024); West Virginia (2025)
- NFL draft: 2026: undrafted

Career history
- Cleveland Browns (2026–present)*
- * Offseason or practice squad member only

Awards and highlights
- First-team All-MW (2024)

Michael Coats Jr. (born June 20, 2001) is an American professional football cornerback for the Cleveland Browns of the National Football League (NFL). He played college football for the East Central Warriors, Nevada Wolf Pack, and West Virginia Mountaineers.

== Early life ==
Coats Jr. attended Biloxi High School in Biloxi, Mississippi, though he did not play any high school sports. After working at an arcade after high school, Coats Jr. enrolled at East Central Community College to play college football after seeing a flyer for a tryout and making the team.

== College career ==
In three years at East Central Community College from 2020 to 2022, Coats Jr. played in 21 games, notching 38 tackles, five sacks, 19 pass deflections, and four interceptions. After the conclusion of the 2022 season, he entered the NCAA transfer portal.

Coats Jr. transferred to play for the Nevada Wolf Pack. In his first season with the Wolf Pack in 2023, he played in ten games, recording 13 tackles, four pass deflections, and an interception. Coats Jr. had a breakout 2024 season, recording 17 pass deflections and four interceptions, earning first-team all-Mountain West honors. After the conclusion of the season, he once again entered the NCAA transfer portal.

Coats Jr. transferred to play for the West Virginia Mountaineers. He finished the 2025 season with 30 tackles with two being for a loss, seven pass deflections, and a forced fumble.

== Professional career ==
Pre-draft measurables
Height	Weight	Arm length	Hand span	Wingspan	40-yard dash	10-yard split	20-yard split	20-yard shuttle	Three-cone drill	Vertical jump	Broad jump	Bench press
5 ft 9 1/4 in (1.76 m)	184 lb (83 kg)	31 1/2 in (0.80 m)	9 1/4 in (0.23 m)	5 ft 11 3/4 in (1.82 m)	4.41 s	1.52 s	2.49 s	4.44 s	6.83 s	36.0 in (0.91 m)	10 ft 8 in (3.25 m)	14 reps
All values from Pro Day

After not being selected in the 2026 NFL draft, Coats Jr. signed with the Cleveland Browns as an undrafted free agent on May 11, 2026. On September 1, despite surviving final roster cuts, Coats was waived by the Browns. Two days later, Cleveland re–signed Coats to their practice squad.
