= Howard McDonnell =

American politician (1909–1992)

Howard Andre McDonnell (June 13, 1909 – February 19, 1992) was an American Democratic politician from Mississippi. He was a member of the Mississippi House of Representatives from 1940 to 1944 and was member of the Mississippi State Senate from 1944 to 1948, 1952 to 1956, and 1964 to 1968.

== Early life and education ==
McDonnell was born on June 13, 1909, in New Orleans, Louisiana. His family moved to Biloxi, Mississippi after he was born and he attended both the Gulf Coast Military Academy and Biloxi High School. McDonnell studied criminology at Loyola University, graduating in 1935. He earned a Juris Doctor from Cumberland School of Law and was admitted to the state bar in 1937. For a time, McDonnell studied business at Draughons College and eventually earned a PhD in Criminologal Research at Walden University.

== Career ==
McDonnell started his career in Biloxi, where he was a practicing attorney and criminologist.McDonnell was an advocate for prisoners' rights and worked to establish a juvenile court system in Mississippi. McDonnell publicly argued in the Sun Herald that such a court would prevent youth offenders from falling into a cycle of violence. In February 1938, he presented a plan for the system to the Mississippi Legislature. While a bill to create the system was introduced, it failed in the House and McDonnell directed his attention towards creating a local version of the system in Biloxi. Also in 1938 he was involved in the creation of the Mississippi Highway Patrol.

In 1939, McDonnell mounted a campaign for the Mississippi House of Representatives. His campaign focused on the promotion of his proposed juvenile court and on offering pensions to public employees. He won the election and took office in 1940. His first term in office he was named chairman of the Committee on Fishing, Commerce, and Shipping. He quickly began laying the groundwork to establish a juvenile court system, sponsoring legislation to do so during his first weeks in office. The bill passed and was signed by the governor that May. In August 1940, McDonnell was drafted into the United States Army. He continued his progressive advocacy in 1942, sponsoring legislation to abolish Mississippi's poll tax, create a school for Black youth, and end the death penalty in the state. At the end of his term, McDonnell chose to run for the Mississippi State Senate, winning election.

In 1944, McDonnell sponsored legislation to create a state parole system which would review parole claims and keep track of recently released prisoners. The bill was passed later that year. Two years later, he sponsored legislation to ban the use of bullwhips in the Mississippi State Penitentiary. That legislation failed to make it out of the Senate. He did not run for re-election upon the expiration of his term. McDonnell ran for State Senate again in 1949 but did not win, losing by 35 points to Billy Meadows. He ran again in 1951, winning election and quickly introducing a bill to end Mississippi's prohibition on alcohol. While that bill failed, McDonnell reintroduced it multiple times during his term. In 1954, he was one of only two senators to vote against a segregationist effort to abolish public schools in Mississippi. McDonnell again ran for State Senate in 1964, defeating Tommy Munroe in the general election. This term followed similar themes to his previous terms, with McDonnell pushing for the legalization of alcohol in the state and advocating for prison reform. Doctor and civil rights activist Gilbert R. Mason pushed for McDonnell to be nominated to the United States Court of Appeals for the Fifth Circuit in 1965, however, President Lyndon B. Johnson ultimately nominated James P. Coleman. McDonnell opted to not run for re-election and his term ended in 1968.

While serving as chairman of the Mississippi Bar's Criminal Law Division in 1975, McDonnell sponsored several resolutions seeking the legalization of homosexuality and marijuana in Mississippi. He wrote the book In The Throes of Criminal Justice, which was published in 1988 by Dorrance Publishing Company. The book was a lengthy explanation of his views on the American criminal justice system.

== Personal life ==
McDonnell was a high school and college football player, for Biloxi High School and Loyola University respectively. McDonnell married Ethel Ruth in 1948. They had a son, Howard Andre McDonnell Jr., and a daughter, Susan Oustalet. McDonnell was a Lutheran when first elected to office but became an Episcopalian later in life. He died on February 19, 1992.
