= Robert Ducksworth =

American football player (born 1963)

No. 33
- Position: Defensive back

Personal information
- Born: January 5, 1963 (age 63); Biloxi, Mississippi, U.S.
- Listed height: 5 ft 11 in (1.80 m)
- Listed weight: 200 lb (91 kg)

Career information
- High school: Biloxi
- College: Southern Miss
- NFL draft: 1986: 8th round, 215th overall pick

Career history
- New York Jets (1986)
- Stats at Pro Football Reference

Robert Charles Ducksworth Jr. (born January 5, 1963) is an American former professional football player who was a defensive back for the New York Jets of the National Football League (NFL). He played college football as a quarterback for the Southern Miss Golden Eagles. He was selected by the Jets in the eighth round of the 1986 NFL draft.
