= Balboa High School (Panama) =

Former secondary school in Panama

Coordinates: 8°57′32.35″N 79°33′26.47″W

- Panama

Balboa High School was a public high school in the former Canal Zone on the isthmus of Panama. It was a part of the Department of Defense Education Activity (DoDEA). Balboa was the capital of the Canal zone.

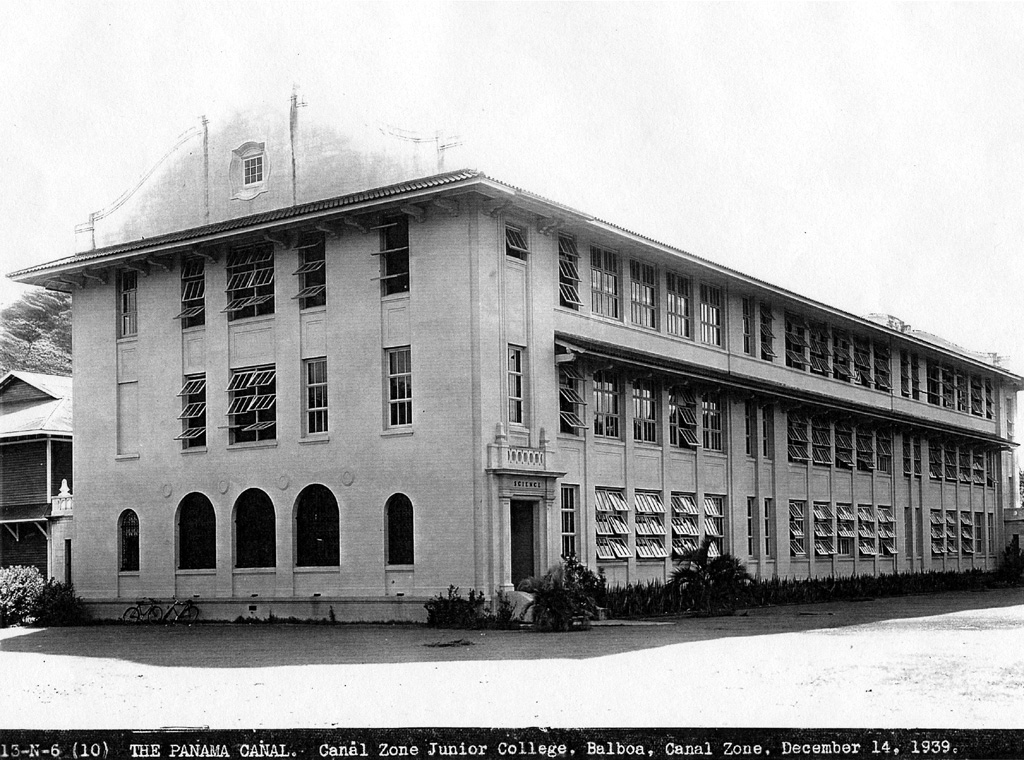
BHS in 1939

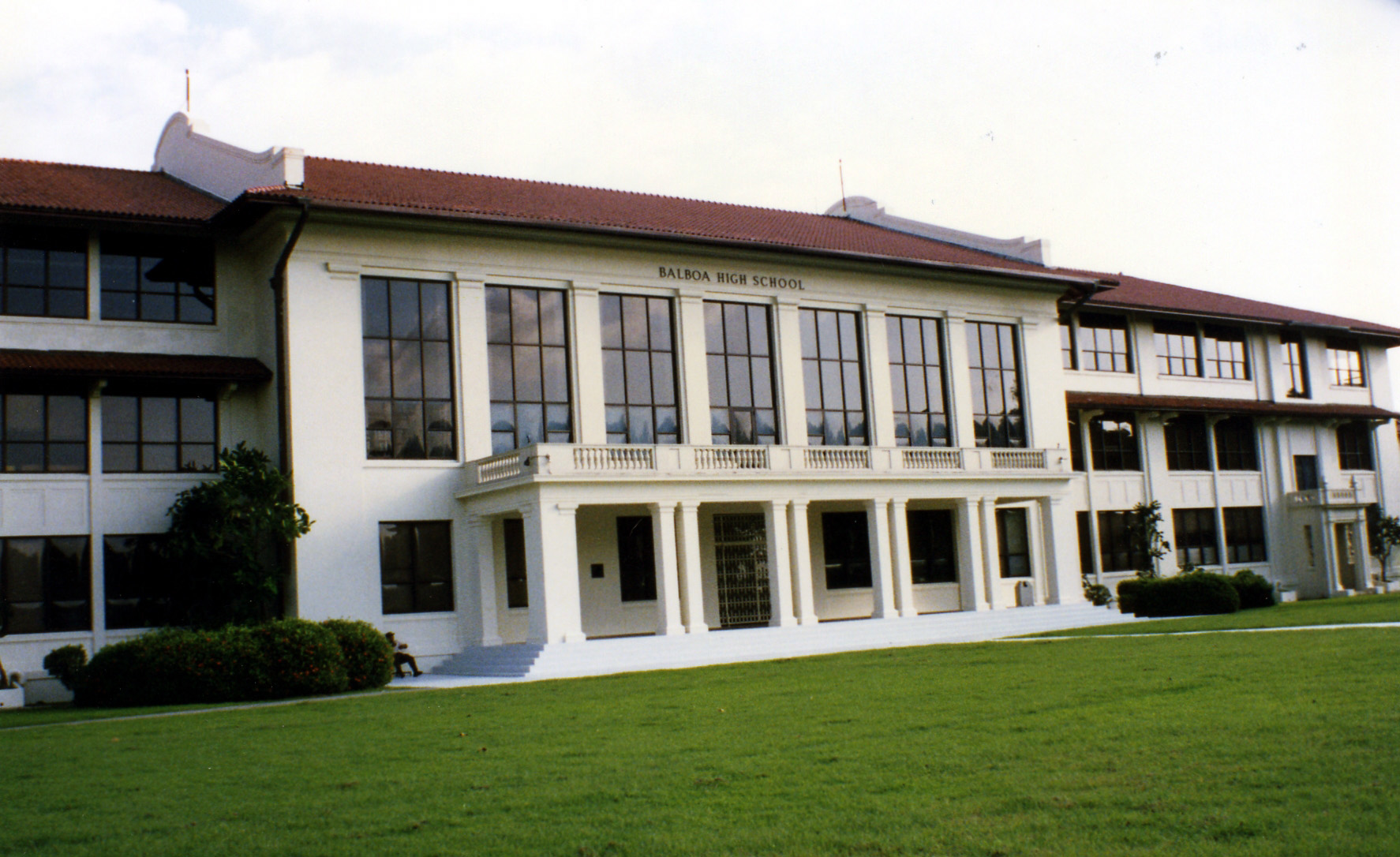
Main building in 1997

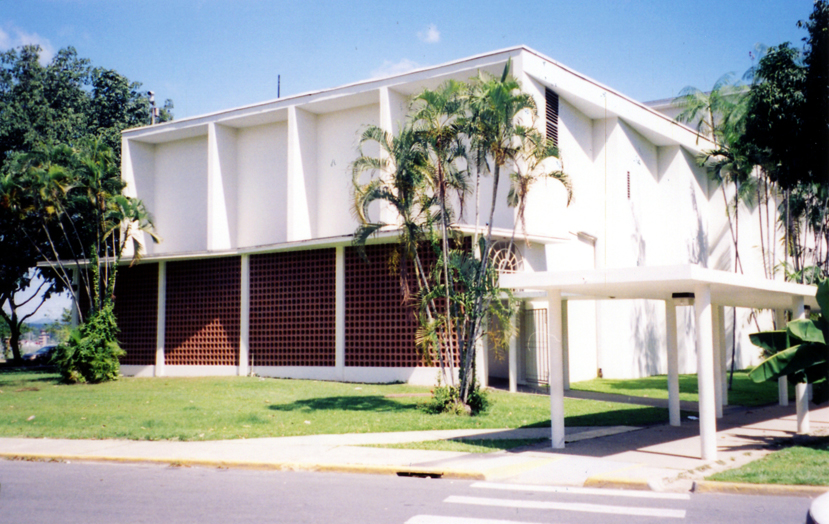
Auditorium building

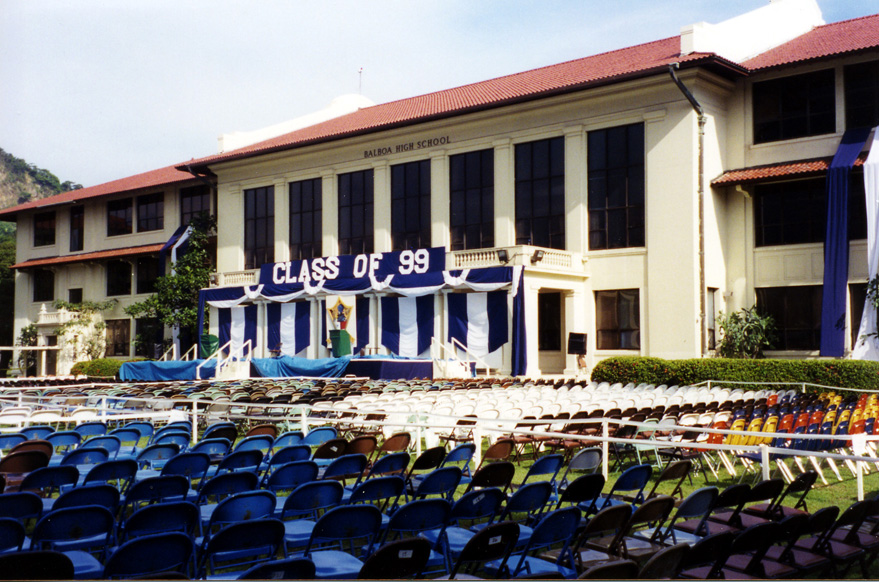
1999 final graduation setting

BHS Plaque

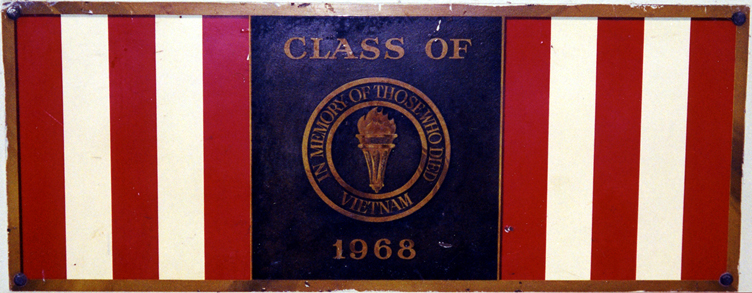
BHS plaque for the 1968 Vietnam War

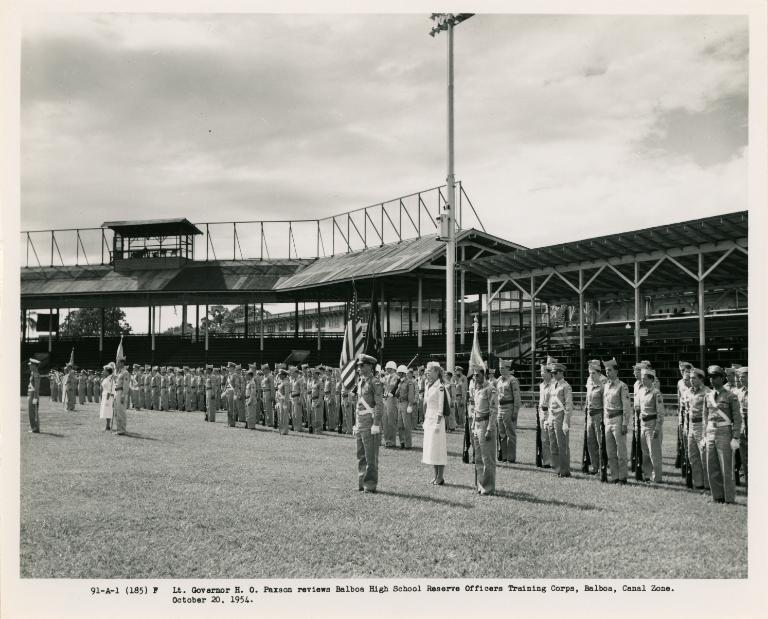
Lt. Governor H. O. Parson reviews Balboa High School Reserve Officers Training Corps. October 20, 1954.

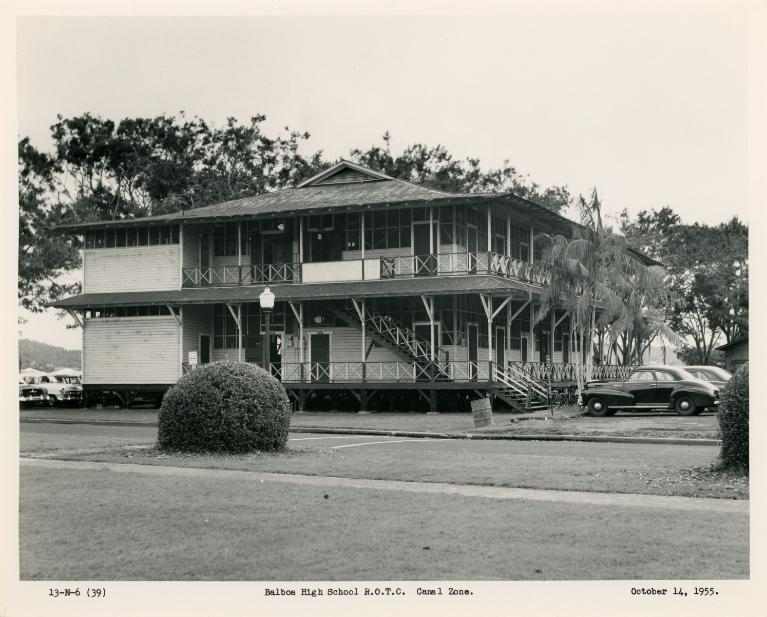
Balboa High School ROTC building. October 14, 1955

== Early history ==
The history of Balboa High School is intimately bound to the history of the Panama Canal and the Canal Zone. Given the temporary nature of the enterprise, public secondary education for white, US employees' children was initially modest and fluid. During the first construction years, American students from Pacific-area towns would commute to a high school in the Atlantic port of Cristobal (and later, Gatun) until separate high school facilities were made available for both areas. It was only after the completion of the Canal that a permanent school system was created and permanent buildings were erected to house Canal Zone secondary schools.

Construction of the first permanent building to house a high school in Balboa was completed in 1917. What came to be Balboa High School was not started until 1942 and completed through additions in 1948, 1949, 1963 and 1969. Prior to that, the high school was located in part of Bldg. 710, known for most of its history as Balboa Elementary School and in a temporary wooden building for several years. Starting in 1966, a junior high school was opened in Curundu to accommodate the overcrowding at Diablo Junior High School.

For most of the Canal Zone's history, Balboa High School's rival was the Atlantic-side Cristobal High School (later Cristobal Junior-Senior High School). Balboa High School had two mascots. The "Red Machine" for students with last names ending in A through K had red and white as the team colors. Students with last names ending in L through Z had the Bulldog as a mascot and their team colors were light blue and white. The Balboa High School Varsity football team mainly played against Cristobal High School and the Canal Zone Junior College. Two other high schools in the Canal Zone, Paraiso High School and Rainbow City High School, were segregated for dependents of the Canal Zone's Afro-Antillean and South Asian employees. Desegregation of these schools began in 1975 and was completed in 1979, at the same time as the Canal Zone's abolition.

Balboa High School operated a popular Junior Reserve Officer Training Corps program in which a majority of male students participated. Junior ROTC was initiated in the Fall school term of 1948, and continued throughout the remainder of the school's history. A shooting range was maintained in the school's basement, and every year the Balboa High School cadets competed against Cristobal High School in a Field Day competition.

=== Martyrs' Day conflict ===
In January 1964, Balboa High School was the scene of a controversial confrontation between high school students from Panama's Instituto Nacional who marched from Panama City to Balboa High School. They tried to lower the American flag and raise the Panamanian flag. Balboa High School students and parents objected. The events, known in Panama as Martyrs' Day and in the U.S. as 1964 Panama Canal riots, started after a Panamanian flag was torn during conflict between Panamanian students and Canal Zone Police officers, over the right of the Panamanian flag to be flown. There are conflicting claims about how the flag was torn. There are also claims that the CIA had fomented the whole situation. (ref. Life magazine)

The ensuing violent reaction by Panamanians at the border with the Canal Zone when news of the torn flag reached Panama City, resulted in an overwhelmed Canal Zone Police calling for support from U.S. Army units that became involved in suppressing the violence, and after three days of fighting, about 21 Panamanians and 4 U.S. soldiers were killed. The incident is considered to be a significant factor in the U.S. decision to transfer control of the Canal Zone to Panama through the 1977 Torrijos-Carter Treaties.

== Late history ==
With the abolition of the Canal Zone government in 1979, Balboa High School, like the rest of the Canal Zone Schools system, fell under the Department of Defense Dependents Schools. Over the next two decades, the population of American Canal Zone dependents decreased as the population of the Canal Zone itself changed. Aside from thousands of American dependents of the Panama Canal Company (later Panama Canal Commission), Canal Zone Government and U.S. armed forces, Balboa High School was also the Alma Mater of many of Panama's business and political elite.

During the December 1989 "Operation Just Cause," which removed General Manuel Noriega from power and ended Panama's 21-year military dictatorship, the premises of the Balboa High School were temporarily used by the US Armed Forces to house civilians displaced from Panama City's El Chorrillo neighborhood by the fires resulting from the attack on the Panamanian Defense Forces' headquarters.

Balboa High School closed in 1999 in anticipation of the handover of the Panama Canal to the Republic of Panama, the removal of final U.S. forces from the isthmus and the closure of the DoDDS Panama. Over the years thousands of Americans and Panamanians graduated from Balboa High School. They included Guillermo Ford, vice president of Panama and Gustavo A. Mellander, noted historian and university administrator. The BHS campus today is used as part of the offices of the Panama Canal Authority (and includes some of the offices of Human Resources, Health Services, etc.). The old Balboa High School gym is now used for the Panama Canal Authority's "Pacific-side" "Center for Worker-&-Employee Health-&-Wellness" (despite the name, it is used as a gym, with some weight-lifting and treadmill facilities, as well as a sauna and racketball court, and a track-and-field with a track made of gravel). The gym, sauna, racketball court, track, and field (which was used by Balboa High School, as well as used as the field for weekly Friday football games and tryouts, and cheerleading meets and tryouts) are all leftovers of the Panama Canal Zone days, as well as the Balboa High School days.

== Notable alumni ==
- Bob Barney and Dave Barney
- Guillermo Ford (1936–2011), vice president of Panama
- Gustavo A. Mellander, historian and university administrator
- Iván Rodríguez Mesa (born 1977), former swimmer, who specialized in breaststroke events
- John L. Miller (1925–1989), politician and judge who represented District 3C in the New Jersey Senate from 1968 to 1974
