= Popp's Ferry Bridge =

- Coordinates: 30°24′57″N 88°58′34″W
- Carries: 2 lanes of Popp's Ferry Road
- Crosses: Back Bay Biloxi
- Locale: Biloxi

Characteristics
- Design: Bascule
- Total length: 3982.9 ft (1214.0 m)
- Longest span: 125 ft (38.1 m)

History
- Opened: 1979

The Popp's Ferry Bridge is a bridge in the U.S. state of Mississippi which carries Popp's Ferry Road over Back Bay Biloxi. The span carries two lanes of traffic and a walkway, with a drawbridge for boat traffic in Back Bay.

== History ==
The first Popp's Ferry bridge was a deck girder swing bridge that opened for traffic in mid-December 1928. The second Popp's Ferry Bridge was a bascule-type bridge built on the location of the 1928 span, opening to public traffic on April 11, 1953.

The current Popp's Ferry Bridge replaced the previous span in 1979. It was severely damaged by Hurricane Katrina in late August 2005, affecting nineteen sections of the concrete decking of the span, the draw, and the walkway. Repairs were completed on December 23, 2005.

On March 20, 2009, a tugboat pushing eight barges hit the bridge pilings. No one was injured, but two ninety-foot (27 m) sections of the bridge dropped into the water. The bridge reopened to traffic on April 25, 2009.

On July 14, 2020, the bridge was struck by a tugboat pushing three barges. It was closed to vehicle traffic for several hours.
