= Genesis Be =

American musician and community organizer

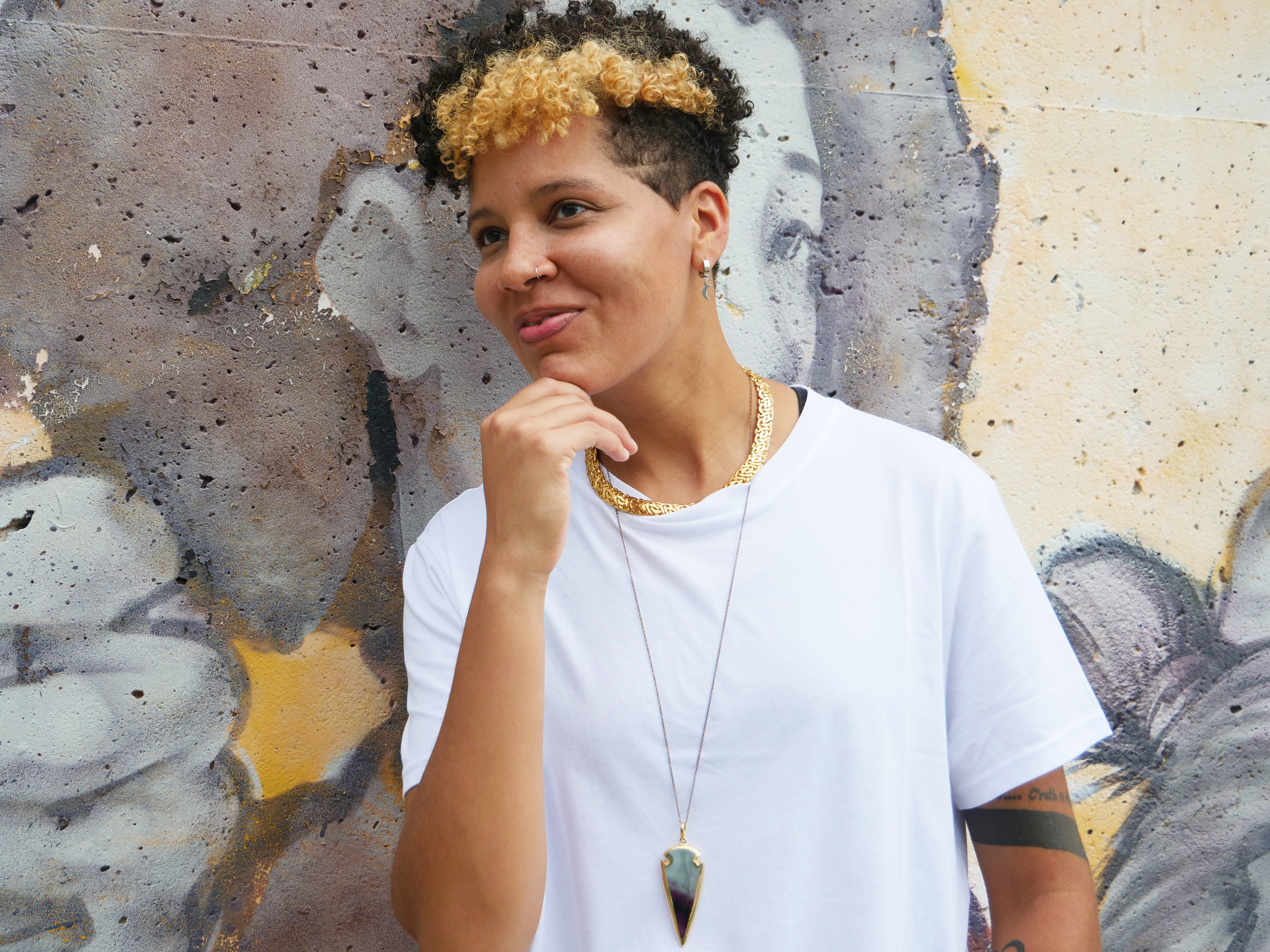
Be in 2020

Genesis Israeli Rose Schmitz Briggs, also known as Genesis Be, is an American multi-disciplinary artist, philosopher and advocate from Biloxi, Mississippi. She is the founder of People Not Things, an organization that promotes pluralism and disrupts systems of division using public speaking, art exhibitions, civil dialogue and multimedia. She is best known for her work to remove the Confederate emblem from the Mississippi state flag. She is the granddaughter of civil rights activist and community leader, Reverend Clyde Briggs.

== Recent activity ==
Mississippi state flag adopted in 2021

Be's work to change the Mississippi state flag has been covered by The Associated Press and Billboard.

== Discography ==
Singles

- 2005: "More Than A Warrior"
- 2007: "I Don't Discriminate"
- 2008: "Lovers Or Friends"
- 2009: "Precious Beyond Measure"
- 2010: "Laughin At Ya Lames"
- 2011: "Like A Movie"
- 2011: "At A Standstill"
- 2013: "Tampons & Tylenol"
- 2016: "My GCK"
- 2020: "The Edge"
- 2023: "Freedom Cry"
- 2023: "Blind Lady Say"
- 2024: "Delta Love"
- 2024: "PLUCK"
- 2024: "Sapiosexual"
- 2024: "Exalted
- 2024: "Dare To Dream"
- 2024: "Blind Lady Say"

Albums

- 2005: 17 In America
- 2006: 18 In America
- 2007: 19 In America
- 2011: Mississippi To Manhattan
- 2014: GENESEQUA
- 2016: Gulf Coast Queen
- 2017: Poli Trap
- 2020: People Not Things
- 2021: To Live & Die In December
