= Henry Francis Fountain =

American architect

Henry "Buddy" Francis Fountain Jr. (born 1924 - died 2011) was an architect in Biloxi, Mississippi. He and his firm were responsible for several public buildings in Biloxi and Ocean Springs, Mississippi.

Fountain was born in Biloxi on November 26, 1924 to Henry F. Fountain (born 1899 - ?) and Lucretia Ann Edmee Thensted (born 1901 - 1930?). His father and grandfather Martin Fountain (1856–1938) were boatbuilders.

Fountain served in the U.S. Navy during World War II. He married Gloria Swetman in June 1950 and graduated from LSU with a B.S. degree in Architectural Engineering in 1951. Francis established his career as a professional architect in 1955.

He and his wife Gloria Swetman Fountain had nine children in Ocean Springs. They lived in the Fountain-Guice home (1969) on Iola Road. The home won a design award from the Southern Pine Association. Fountain died on June 5, 2011.

== Work ==
- Mississippi Coast Coliseum, Biloxi
- Our Lady of Fatima Catholic Church, Biloxi
- Biloxi High School (1961), Biloxi (A newer building was constructed for the school in 2002)
- Biloxi Public Safety Complex, Biloxi
- St. John's Catholic Church (1959), Ocean Springs
- Pecan Park Elementary School (1967), Ocean Springs
- Ocean Springs Hospital (1968)
- Magnolia Park Elementary School (1969)
- Ocean Springs Hospital additions and alterations (1977)
- Ocean Springs High School Fine Arts Building
- Ocean Springs Hospital outpatient services addition (1989)
- Ocean Springs Hospital emergency room and ICU (1995)
- Ocean Springs Hospital third floor addition (1998)
