= United States in the Korean War =

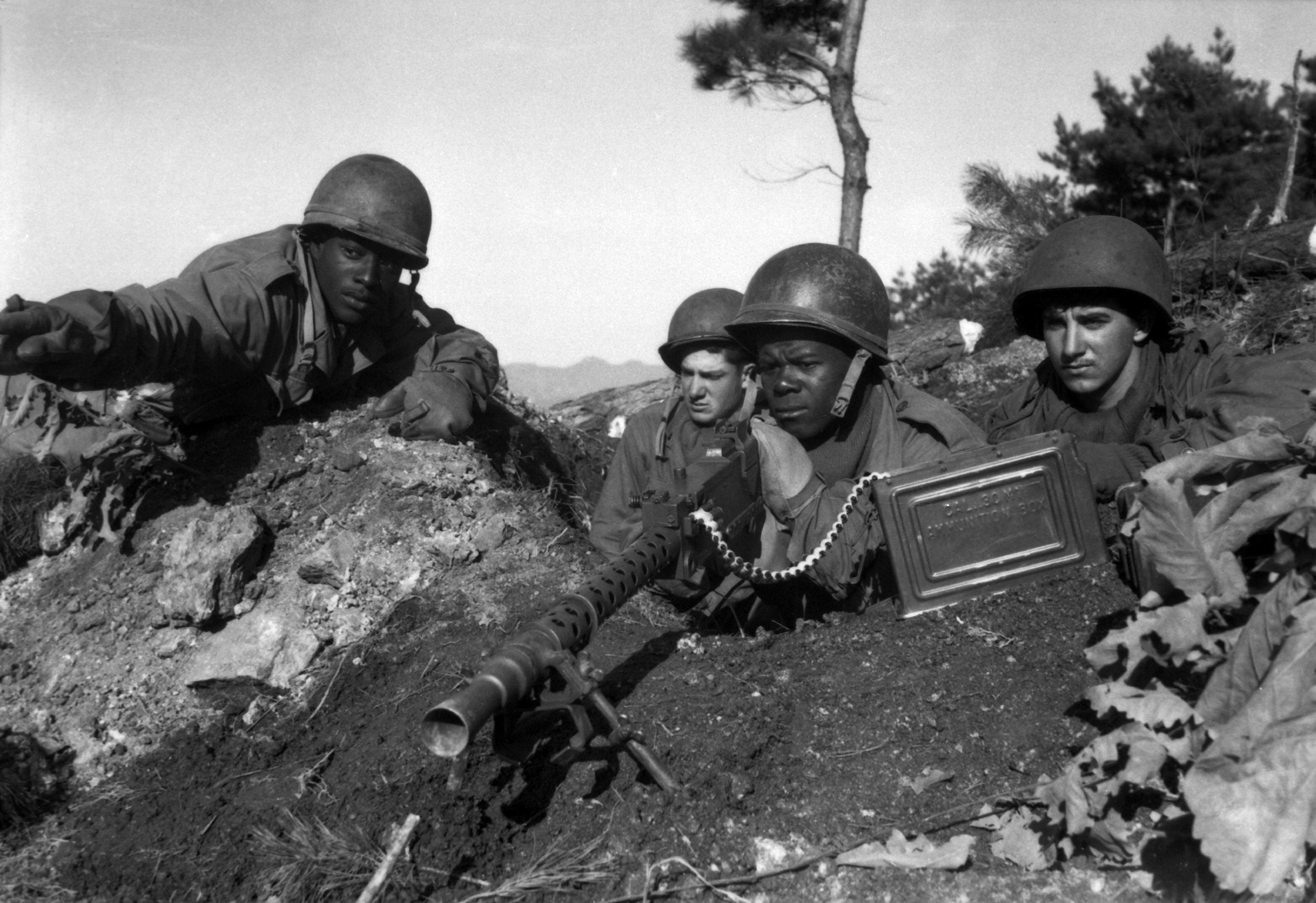
Soldiers from the US 2nd Infantry Division in action near the Ch'ongch'on River, 20 November 1950

The military history of the United States in Korea began after the defeat of Japan by the Allied Powers in World War II. This brought an end to 35 years of Japanese occupation of the Korean peninsula and led to the peninsula being divided into two zones; a northern zone occupied by the Soviet Union and a southern zone occupied by the United States. After negotiations on reunification, the latter became the Republic of Korea or South Korea in August 1948 while the former became the Democratic People's Republic of Korea or North Korea in September 1948. In June 1949, after the establishment of the Republic of Korea, the U.S. military withdrew from the Korean Peninsula, only to return less than a year at the start of the Korean War, with Truman sending US forces to assist South Korea.

In 1950, a North Korean invasion began the Korean War, which saw extensive U.S.-led U.N. intervention in support of the South, while the North received support from China and from the Soviet Union.

The United States entered the war led by president Harry S. Truman, and ended the war led by Dwight D. Eisenhower, who took over from Truman in January 1953. The war was a major issue in the November 1952 presidential election, and aided Eisenhower's victory.

== Background ==
At the conclusion of World War II, the Allied nations began the process of disarmament of Axis-controlled regions. Japan occupied Korea at this time and had been in control since 1910. In 1945, the decision was made to have American Marine forces oversee Japanese surrender and disarmament south of the 38th parallel and the Soviet Union would facilitate the change of power to the north. At the time there was no political motivation and seemed to be a logical and convenient plan of action. The original agreement and intent was to create a unified and independent Korea out of the post Japanese occupation era. Instead each side of the 38th parallel established its own government under the influence of the occupational country; the United States in South Korea and the Soviet Union in North Korea. Both new Korean governments discredited the other and claimed to be the only legitimate political system. Tensions between the North and South escalated and each side began to petition foreign powers for resources and support. South Korea wanted weapons and supplies from President Truman and the United States government while North Korea sought help from Joseph Stalin and the Soviet Union. The United States was still war weary from the disruptive World War II campaign and refused South Korea's request for weapons and troops. North Korea convinced the Soviet Union to supply them with the weapons and support they requested. This decision coincided with the United States withdrawing the last remaining combat troops from South Korea. North Korea saw its opportunity and attacked South Korean forces at the 38th parallel on June 25, 1950 and thus initiating the Korean War. Between 1946 and 1960, the United States provided extensive military training to the South Korean army (ROK). This changed the armed forces from an inefficient organization to a dominant institution within South Korean society. As the military became more efficient, it gained greater influence over national politics and internal security, which in turn relieved American troops.

== Initial response ==
Following North Korea's invasion of South Korea, the United Nations convened to formulate a response, demanding North Korea's immediate withdrawal. United States Army General Douglas MacArthur was appointed supreme commander of U.N. forces. To halt the rapid progress of North Korean forces into the south Task Force Smith was deployed to the Korean front from Japan. Task Force Smith consisted of U.S. Army officers and regiments of the Army's 24th Infantry Division that were stationed in Japan as occupational forces. The 24th were under trained, poorly supplied, and outnumbered. The 24th offered very little resistance against the North Korean advance. American and South Korean troops were pushed south and in late July 1950 Task Force Smith was overrun in the city of Taejon. Troops from the Army's 25th Infantry Division were deployed to Taejon to establish a new line and pullout the decimated 24th I.D. This addition of combat troops did not stop the North Korean advance and both American and South Korean troops were pushed further south.

== Main Battles ==
=== Battle of Osan (5 July 1950) ===
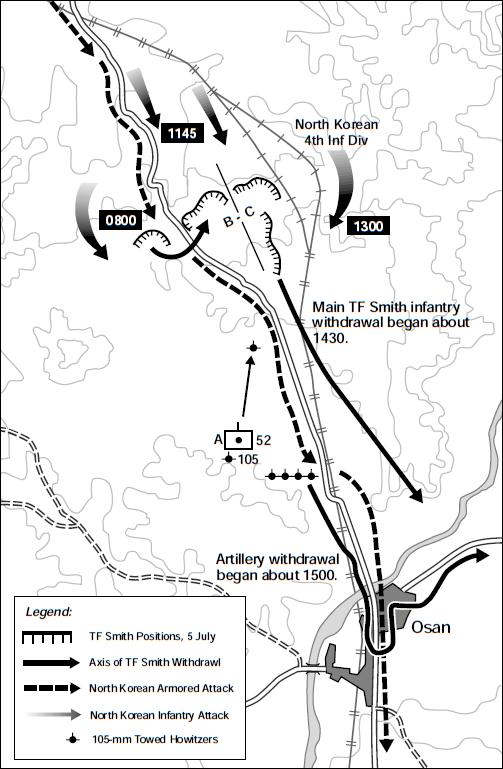
Map of the Battle of Osan

The first battle the Americans entered in the Korean War was the Battle of Osan, where about four hundred U.S. soldiers landed in Busan airport on the first of July, 1950. The American troops were sent off to Daejon the next morning where Major General John H. Church the head of U.S. field headquarters was confident in the US troop's strengths to push back the North Koreans.

On July 5, the troops were finally put to the test when North Korean tanks crept towards Osan. The four hundred infantryman of the U.S. also called Task Force Smith opened fire on the North Koreans at 8:16 am. Only four of the North Korean tanks were destroyed and twenty-nine kept moving forward breaking the US line. At the end of the battle only two more North Korean Tanks and two regiments of North Korean infantry were destroyed. The US had lost the battle, revealing that the mere sight of US troops would not reverse the military balance in Korea. By early August, the North Korean troops had pushed back the US and South Korean troops all the way to Naktong River, which is located approximately thirty miles from Busan. The two weeks of fighting following this resulted in the most casualties of US troops than any other equivalent period of this war. However, during this time the US pushed supplies and personnel to Korea and by the end of July, South Koreans and US troops outnumbered the North Koreans, although the North had pushed back the US and South significantly the North had suffered over fifty thousand casualties. Also, because North Korea's supply lines were so lengthy and with the US in control of the water and air replenishing their losses were slow.

=== Battle of Inchon (10–19 September 1950) ===
Although MacArthur clearly stated that the Battle of Incheon was a 5000 to 1 gamble, it was an important military move to make. Incheon is 25 miles from Seoul on the coast and only once during September is the water even deep enough to allow the 29 foot draft of American LSTs. It was a defenders' best place to allow troops into Korea, and to push the invaders back. On September 15 the 1st Marine Division landed at the port city, taking the defending North Koreans completely by surprise, and by the end of the night over a third of Incheon was taken back.

== Impact ==
=== Economy ===
The United States supplied significant financial aid to the South Korea, but the Rhee administration repeatedly requested additional funds to expand the military. These demands were deemed excessive and led the U.S to impose limits on the budget. Despite having fewer capital resources Rhee continued to prioritize expansion of the armed forces. The regime borrowed heavily from the South Korean central bank and printed more money, ignoring U.S warnings against doing so. This directly contributed to rising inflation within the country and increased the prices of raw materials. Although Rhee’s decisions were considered harmful to the economy by the U.S officials, they still felt compelled to support his administration and accept his controversial choices in exchange for suppressing communism.

=== News coverage ===
During the Korean War, news was reported on though it was subjected to a degree of censorship but not controlled by the military similar to the Vietnam War. The press had a more sour relationship with the military compared to the relationship it had during World War II where they obliged with the requests of the military.

=== Public opinion ===
Toward the beginning of the war, support for the war was at its highest point according to Gallup polling. Protests regarding the Korean War were rather limited. This was due to: strong anti-communist sentiments in the United States, most people agreeing with the Truman foreign policy and the collapse of organizations which were left-wing/pacifistic (such as: the Socialist Party of America, Wisconsin Progressive Party and the Minnesota Farmer Labor Party) Those who protested the Korean War were primarily on the American right compared to the Vietnam War whose protesters were mainly left-wing.

== Casualties ==
As of 2021, 1,789,000 Americans served in the war, with 36,574 deaths (battle deaths 33,739, other deaths 2,835), and 103,284 wounded.

As of 2022, according to the list of Wall of Remembrance in the Korean War Veterans Memorial, killed soldiers were 36,634. However, this figure fluctuates depending on the ongoing correction of the list.

As of 2014, the total number of POWs and MIAs is 8,176. Total captured were 7,245 (killed in POW Camps: 2,806, returned: 4,418, defectors: 21) and unaccounted were 931.

As of 2023, the total number of MIAs and unaccounted remains is 7,428.

== Japan ==
During the mid-1940s, Germany and Japan were both at a desperate state caused by World War II. Germany received a sort of benefit from the U.S. as a compensation of war and reconstruction. The Japanese on the other end were devastated by the aftermath. People were suffering, eating out of garbage, and many people starved. Meanwhile, the U.S. troops in the Korean War were in great demand of uniforms and other equipment. The American government turned to Japan for the favor, which eventually stimulated the manufacturing factories that were in jeopardy due to damage caused by World War II. Japan accepted the offer and mainly supplied U.S. troops in Korea with uniforms and other sorts of clothing. Bases were also erected in Japan for U.S. Air Force planes, such as B-29 Superfortress bombers.

== Controversies ==
A controversial event in the war domestically was when President Truman fired General Douglas MacArthur in April 1951. Another point of controversy were the Chinese and North Korean allegations that the U.N. forces engaged in biological warfare.

In addition to these controversial events, the topic of nuclear weapons caused widespread debate among world leaders. Internally, the United States had to consider various perspectives when making this decision. General Douglas MacArthur was a large proponent for the use of atomic weapons as he pushed for all-out war in Korea. However, he gave little thought to the social and political implications of this decision. The Joint Chiefs of Staff were President Truman’s top military officials who offered a different perspective, thus they were very against the use of atomic weapons to end the conflict. These advisors aimed to end the war in a way that would not cause further conflicts for the United States, so they had to approach the situation with caution. At the time of the Korean War, nuclear weapons programs were still in development and the United States did not have the supply of weapons that we would later see by the end of the Cold War. This small stockpile of weapons forced military officials to prioritize their security interests and determine the places where atomic weapons would be most useful. The United States’ primary allies were in Europe, so the Joint Chiefs of Staff felt it was more important to save the supply of weapons to aid European allies as opposed to those in Asia. America’s NATO allies, specifically Great Britain, were very opposed to the use of nuclear weapons in the conflict in Korea. These relationships had a heavy influence on U.S. decision-making, thus playing a large role in the decision to not use nuclear weapons in order to avoid further controversy. The United States needed to maintain positive relationships with her European allies as there was the looming threat of a future war with the Soviet Union which would have required an immense amount of support.

== Women ==
Most women from the United States who served during the Korean War were nurses. At the time, women served separately in the military from men. Compared to World War II, there was now a reserve and active component and, upon entering the Korean War, the United States called up reservists in the Women's Army Corps who were eligible. Overall, recruiting women into the military was much more difficult due to recent fatigue from World War II and more women wanting to be married. Initially there was ceiling of 2% percent of the branches respective force could be women but this was later lifted. Between 1950 and 1951, the number of women in the military increased. However, as the war went on the number of women in the service and enlisting in it began to decline.

== See also ==
- United Nations Forces in the Korean War
- Medical support in the Korean War
- Korean War Veterans Memorial
