= Biloxi Public School District =

School district in Mississippi, United States

Address
- 160 St. Peter Street Biloxi, Harrison County, Mississippi; United States

District information
- Grades: Pre-Kindergarten - Grade 12
- Schools: 10
- NCES District ID: 2800630

Students and staff
- Students: 5,764
- Teachers: 445.51 FTE
- Student–teacher ratio: 12.94:1

Other information
- Website: www.biloxischools.net

The Biloxi Public School District is a public school district based in Biloxi, Mississippi. Most of the district serves Biloxi.

== Schools ==
=== High school ===
- Grades 9-12
  - Biloxi Senior High School

=== Junior high schools ===
- Grades 7-8
  - Biloxi Junior High School

=== Elementary schools ===
- Grades 5-6
  - Biloxi Upper Elementary School
- Grades K-4
  - Back Bay Elementary School
  - North Bay Elementary School
  - Popp's Ferry Elementary School
- Nichols Elementary/Gorenflo Elementary Zone
  - Nichols Elementary serves students in grades PreK-K
  - Gorenflo Elementary serves students in grades 1-4

== Demographics ==
=== 2006-07 school year ===
There were a total of 4,711 students enrolled in the Biloxi Public School District during the 2006–2007 school year. The gender makeup of the district was 49% female and 51% male. The racial makeup of the district was 33.45% African American, 54.43% White, 4.82% Hispanic, 7.07% Asian, and 0.23% Native American. 47.7% of the district's students were eligible to receive free lunch.

=== Previous school years ===
School Year	Enrollment	Gender Makeup		Racial Makeup				
School Year	Enrollment	Female	Male	Asian	African American	Hispanic	Native American	White
2005-06	5,244	49%	51%	6.96%	34.04%	4.16%	0.23%	54.61%
2004-05	6,305	48%	52%	7.79%	34.86%	3.54%	0.22%	53.59%
2003-04	6,228	48%	52%	8.38%	33.37%	3.37%	0.21%	54.67%
2002-03	6,171	49%	51%	8.56%	32.75%	3.55%	0.36%	54.79%

== Accountability statistics ==
	2006-07	2005-06	2004-05	2003-04	2002-03
District Accreditation Status	Accredited	Accredited	Accredited	Accredited	Accredited
School Performance Classifications
Level 5 (Superior Performing) Schools	7	9	9	8	8
Level 4 (Exemplary) Schools	2	1	1	2	1
Level 3 (Successful) Schools	1	0	0	0	0
Level 2 (Under Performing) Schools	0	0	0	0	0
Level 1 (Low Performing) Schools	0	0	0	0	0
Not Assigned	0	0	0	0	1

== See also ==
- List of school districts in Mississippi
