= Border barrier =

Wall or barrier at national boundaries

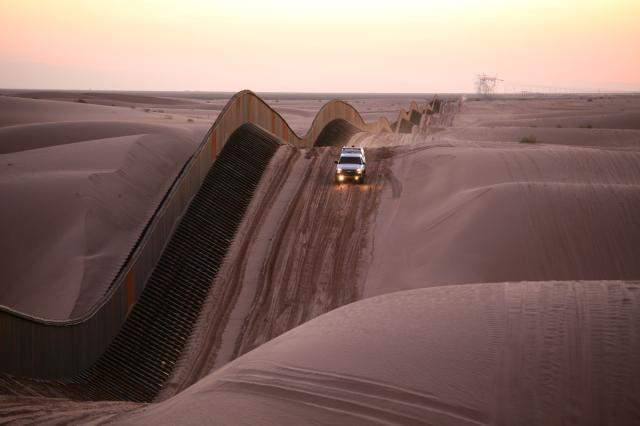
Mexico–United States barrier at the Algodones Dunes in California

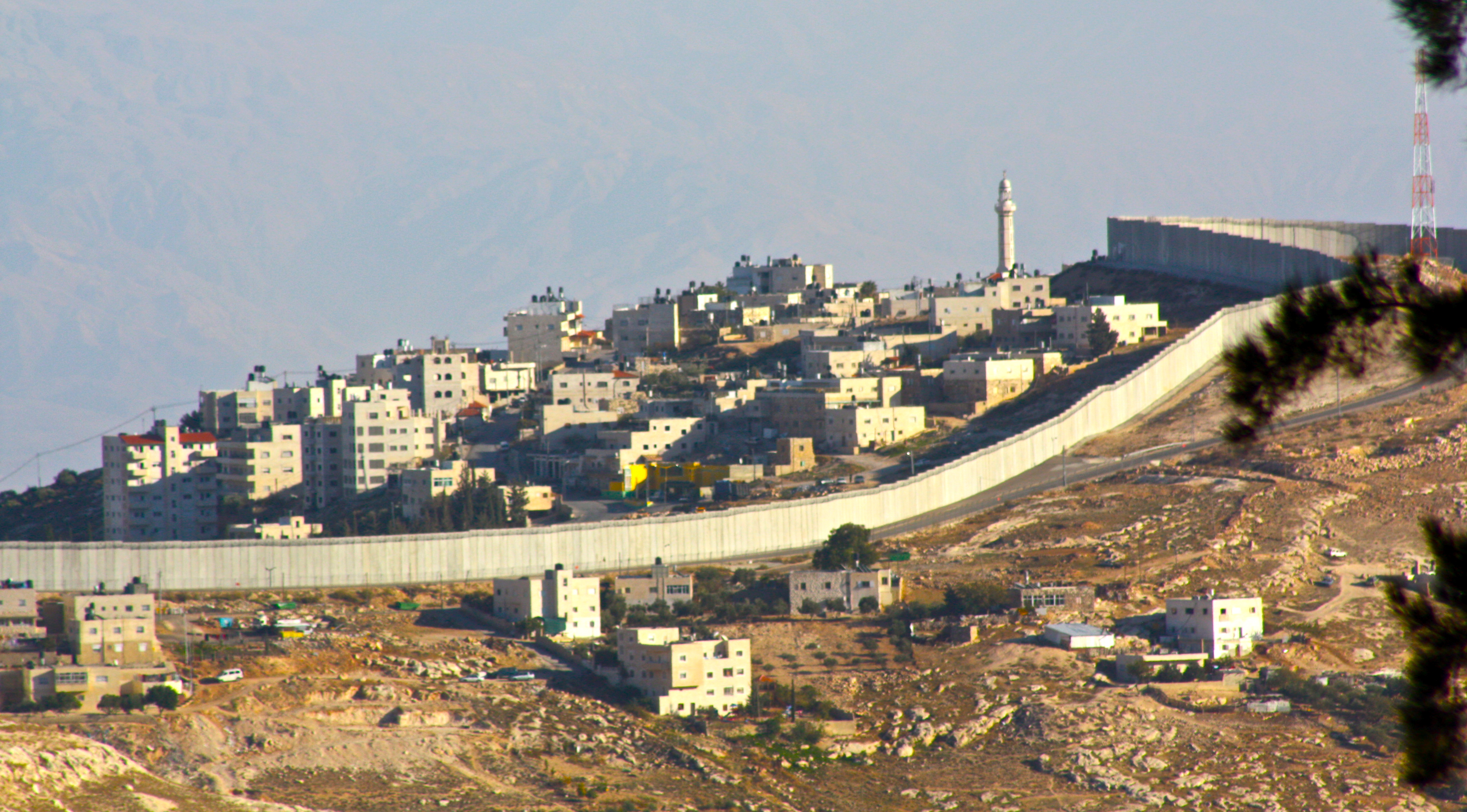
Israeli West Bank barrier

A border barrier, border fence or border wall is a separation barrier that runs along or near an international border. Such barriers are typically constructed for border control purposes such as curbing illegal immigration, human trafficking, and smuggling. Some such barriers are constructed for defence or security reasons. In cases of a disputed or unclear border, erecting a barrier can serve as a de facto unilateral consolidation of a territorial claim that can supersede formal delimitation. A border barrier does not usually indicate the location of the actual border, and is usually constructed unilaterally by a country, without the agreement or cooperation of the other country.

Examples of border walls include the ancient Great Wall of China, a series of walls separating China from nomadic empires to the north. The construction of border barriers increased in the early 2000s; half of all the border barriers built since World War II, which ended in 1945, were built after 2000.

== List of current barriers ==
Note: The table can be sorted alphabetically or chronologically using the icon.

Name	Countries affected	Built and maintained by	Date built	Length (km)	Deaths during crossing attempts	References
Argentina–Paraguay	Argentina and Paraguay	Argentina	2014	1.3		
Austrian border barrier	Austria, Italy, and Slovenia	Austria	2015	3.7		
Morocco- Algeria	Morocco and Algeria	Morocco	2014	150 km		
Algeria- Morocco	Algeria and Morocco	Algeria	2013	150 km		
Belize–Guatemala	Belize and Guatemala	Belize	Proposed, agreed	N/A		
Botswana–Zimbabwe	Botswana and Zimbabwe	Botswana	2003	500	8	
Brunei–Malaysia	Brunei and the city of Limbang, Malaysia	Brunei	2005	20		
Bulgaria–Turkey barrier	Bulgaria and Turkey	Bulgaria	2014	30		
Calais border barrier	United Kingdom and France	United Kingdom and France	2016	1		
Ceuta border fence	Spain and Morocco	Spain	2001	8	13–18 depending on estimates.	
Costa Rica–Nicaragua	Costa Rica and Nicaragua	Costa Rica	Proposed	N/A		
Green Line (Cyprus)	Cyprus and Northern Cyprus	Cyprus and the United Nations	1964	180		
Chinese–Korean border fence	China and North Korea	China	2011	1,416		
Chile–Bolivia ditch	Chile and Bolivia	Chile	2022 (Under construction)	N/A		
China-Vietnam/Myanmar border wall	China, Vietnam and Myanmar	China	2021	3,468		
Denmark–Germany border fence	Denmark and Germany	Denmark	2019	70		
Dominican–Haiti border fence	Dominican Republic and Haiti	Dominican Republic	Partially completed	N/A		
Egypt–Gaza barrier	Egypt and Gaza Strip	Egypt	1979, low concrete wall (2.5–3m tall) with barbed wire as part of initial security measures; 2009 Underground steel barrier (10–11 km long, 18m deep) to block smuggling tunnels.	3.1		
Estonia–Russia barrier	Estonia and Russia	Estonia	2018	110		
Finland–Russia border barrier	Finland and Russia	Finland	2023	200		
Greece–Turkey border	Greece and Turkey	Greece	2012, expanded 2021	200		
North Macedonia–Greece barrier	North Macedonia and Greece	North Macedonia	2015	30		
Malaysia–Thailand border	Thailand and Malaysia	Thailand	70's, 2001	650		
Melilla border fence	Spain and Morocco	Spain	1998	11		
Myanmar -Bangladesh border fence	Myanmar and Bangladesh	Myanmar	2017	271		
Hungary–Serbia barrier	Hungary and Serbia	Hungary	2015	175		
Hungary–Croatia barrier	Hungary and Croatia	Hungary	2015	41		
India–Bangladesh barrier	India and Bangladesh	India	Under construction	3,268		
India–Myanmar barrier	India and Myanmar	India	Under construction	1,624		
India-Nepal barrier	India and Nepal	India	Under construction	?		
India–Pakistan barrier	India and Pakistan	India	2004	550		
Iran–Pakistan barrier	Iran and Pakistan	Pakistan and Iran	Under construction	959		
Iran–Afghanistan barrier	Iran and Afghanistan	Iran	1992, 2024(Under construction)	30 km built in 1992, 300 km planned to be built, 100 km built so far in 2025		
Jordan - Syria	Jordan and Syria	Jordan	2015	100 km barriers and deep trenches		
Israel-West Bank barrier	Israel and Palestine	Israel	Partially Completed	708		
Israel-Egypt barrier	Israel and Egypt	Israel	2013	245		
Israel-Lebanon barrier	Israel and Lebanon	Israel	2018	11		
Israel-Gaza barrier	Israel and Gaza Strip	Israel	1994	N/A		
Kazakhstan–Uzbekistan barrier	Kazakhstan and Uzbekistan	Kazakhstan	2006	45		
Kenya - Somalia barrier	Kenya and Somalia	Kenya	2015 (Under construction)	planned 700 km, done only 10–13 km of fence with barbed wire		
Korean Demilitarized Zone	North Korea and South Korea	North Korea and United Nations Command	1953	248		
Kruger National Park	South Africa and Mozambique	South Africa	1975	120	89 (Army), over 200 (Various churches)	
South Africa–Zimbabwe Border	South Africa and Zimbabwe	South Africa	2000s	225		
Kuwait–Iraq barrier	Kuwait and Iraq	Kuwait	1991	193		
Latvia–Russia border fence	Latvia and Russia	Latvia	2015	90		
Libya–Tunisia barrier	Libya and Tunisia	Tunisia	2015	200 km barrier - moat and sand wall (out of 500 km of border)		
Lithuania-Belarus barrier	Lithuania and Belarus	Lithuania	2021	502		
Lithuania–Russia border fence	Lithuania and Russia	Lithuania	2017	130		
Norway–Russia border barrier	Norway and Russia	Norway	2016	0,2		
Oman–Yemen	Oman and Yemen	Oman	2013	288		
Pakistan–Afghanistan barrier	Pakistan and Afghanistan	Pakistan	2017 started	2,670		
Poland–Belarus barrier	Poland and Belarus	Poland	2022	186	21	
Saudi–Yemen barrier	Saudi Arabia and Yemen	Saudi Arabia	2004	75		
Saudi–Iraq barrier	Saudi Arabia and Iraq	Saudi Arabia	2014	900		
Slovenia–Croatia barrier	Slovenia and Croatia	Slovenia	2016	220		
Serbia–North Macedonia barrier	Serbia and North Macedonia	Serbia	2020	240		
Turkey–Syria border barrier	Turkey and Syria	Turkey	2018	764 km finished, planned 911 km, 2 m wide, 3 m high concrete structure		
Turkey–Iran border barrier	Turkey and Iran	Turkey	Start of construction in 2017	Planned 295 km, finished as of 2025 170 km		
Turkmenistan – Uzbekistan barrier	Turkmenistan and Uzbekistan	Turkmenistan	2001	1,700		
Ukraine Russia/Belorussia barrier	Ukraine, Russia and Belarus	Ukraine	Started 2015 - on halt 2022 with Russian invasion	2,000		
United Arab Emirates–Oman barrier	United Arab Emirates and Oman	United Arab Emirates	2018	410		
Mexico–United States barrier	United States and Mexico	United States	Partially Constructed as of 2025, to be completed by 2029.	1,749		
Uzbek–Afghanistan barrier	Uzbekistan and Afghanistan	Uzbekistan	2001	209		
Uzbek–Kyrgyzstan barrier	Uzbekistan and Kyrgyzstan	Uzbekistan	1999	870		
Hong Kong-China barrier and Forts	Hong Kong and mainland China	United Kingdom and Hong Kong	1950s, 1962 updated,	33 km		
(Gibraltar) United Kingdom-Spain barrier	(Gibraltar) United Kingdom and Spain	United Kingdom and Gibraltar	1909	1.24		
Ethiopia–Eritrea barrier	Ethiopia and Eritrea	Ethiopia and Eritrea	1990s–2000s	?		

== Border barriers in history ==
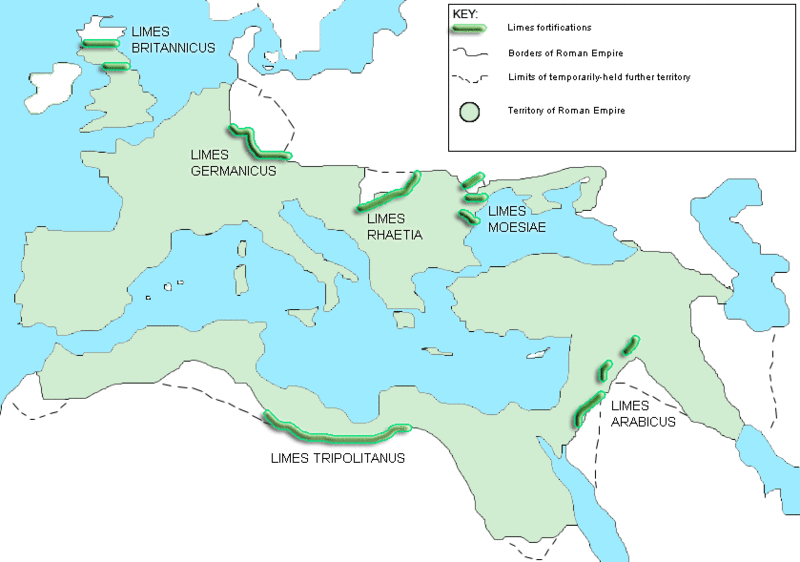
Map of the Roman Empire, along with locations of limes

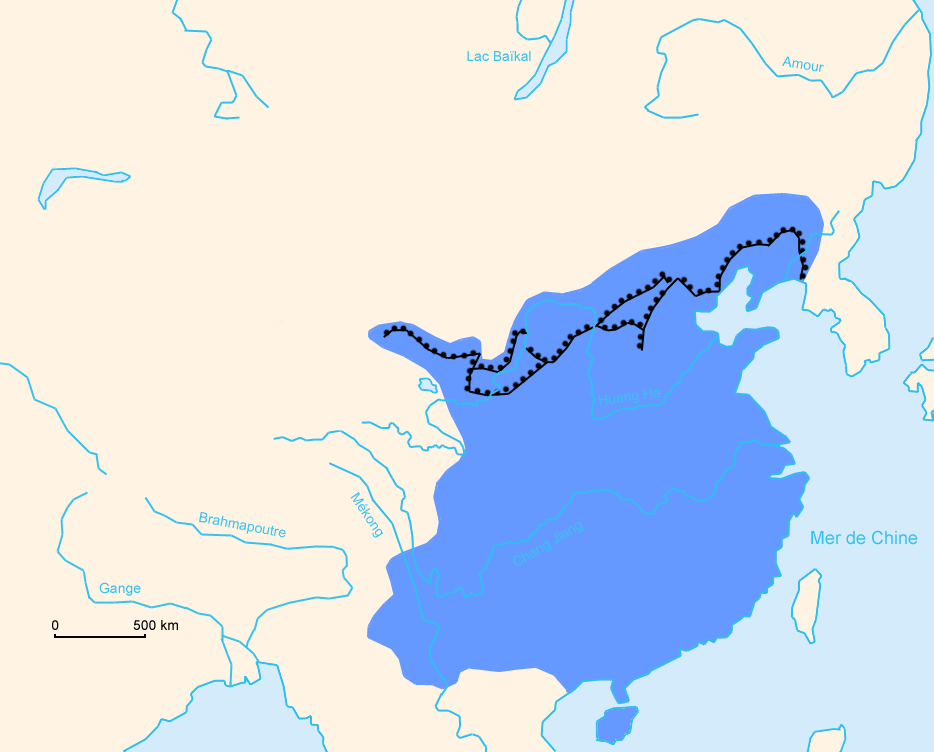
The extent of the Ming dynasty and its walls, which formed most of what is called the Great Wall of China today

=== Antiquity ===
- Antonine Wall (began in AD 142 by the Roman province in Britain)
- Anastasian Wall (built from AD 469, west of Constantinople)
- Great Wall of China (parts were built as early as the 7th century BC by the Qi dynasty in China)
- Great Wall of Gorgan (built in 5th or 6th century AD)
- Hadrian's Wall (begun in AD 122)
- Madukkarai Wall (may have been built as early as the 1st century AD in India)
- Southern Great Wall, southern counterpart wall to the Great Wall, erected to protect and divide the Chinese from the "southern barbarians" called Miao (meaning barbaric and nomadic)

=== Middle Ages ===
- Cheolli Jangseong
- The fortifications, castles and border walls between the Emirate of Granada and the Crown of Castile, later Spain between 1238 and 2 January 1492 although it continued as the internal border of the Crown of Castile, then Spain as Kingdom of Granada from 2 January 1492 to 29 September 1833. A large part of the fortifications, castles and walls is currently in good condition.
- Asilah: The King Alfonso V of Portugal built walls on the outskirts of the city of Asilah, serving as a border between the Kingdom of Portugal and the Marinid dynasty (1471–1472), the Saadi Sultanate (1472–1550), the Wattasid dynasty (1577–1589), in the area of the sea there are still cannons next to a Portuguese square tower. Currently the Wall is in good condition.
- Macau: Ming dynasty (currently China) built a wall around Macau in 1570.

=== Early modern period ===
- Great Hedge of India, built by the British in 1803
- The border forts between the Captaincy General of Chile later Chile and the Mapuche territory that served as the border between the two from 1598 to 1883, which was delimited mainly by the Biobío river, the route passed through the Province of Biobío, Region of Biobío and the Region of Araucanía.
- Zanja de Alsina, built in the 1870s along the southern frontier of Argentina
- The points, forts and border barriers that functioned between the French Conchinchina and the Nguyễn dynasty that functioned between 1862 and 1887.

=== Defunct barriers in modern times ===
- The posts and barriers between Kiautschou Bay Leased Territory and Qing dynasty later China between 1898 and 1914 and later served as the border between the Empire of Japan and the China, that worked between November 7, 1914, and December 10, 1922, and reoccupied in the Second Sino-Japanese War from 1937 and 1945.
- The posts and border barriers between Leased Territory of Guangzhouwan and Qing dynasty later China that worked between 1898 and 1945.
- The Czechoslovak border fortifications and fortified defensive lines built between 1935 and 1938 as a defensive countermeasure against the rising threat of Nazi Germany.
- The Maginot Line, built between 1929 and 1938 by France on the French–German border as a defensive structure.
- The border posts and barriers between the (Empire of Japan) through the (Karafuto Prefecture) and the (Russian Empire after Russian SSR after USSR) through the Sakhalin Oblast that operated between 5 September 1907 and 25 August 1945.
- The border posts, forts and walls between the Russian Dalian (Russian Empire) and the Qing dynasty between 27 March 1898 – 5 September 1905 and between the Kwantung Leased Territory (Empire of Japan) and the (Qing dynasty 5 September 1905 – 10 October 1911 and the Republic of China 10 October 1911 – 1932), later Manchukuo (1932 – 14 August 1945) later by the USSR as the Soviet occupation of Manchuria between August 14, 1945, and May 3, 1946, when it was returned to the Republic of China.
- The posts, forts and border barriers that operated between the British Burma (1824–1858, 1947–1948) later British Raj through the province of British Burma and French Indochina, Kingdom of Siam and Qing dynasty later China).
- The frontier posts, forts and barriers that operated between the colony and overseas territory of the French India and (Mughal Empire after Maratha Empire after Company Rule in India after British Raj after India) which operated between 1664 and 1 November 1954.
- The posts, forts and border barriers between Finland and the former Soviet Union, in the Hanko peninsula (1940–1941) and in the Porkkala peninsula (1945–1956).
- The frontier posts, forts and barriers that operated between the colony and overseas province of the Portuguese India and (Mughal Empire after Bijapur Sultanate after Maratha Empire after Company Rule in India after British Raj after India) which functioned between 15 August 1505 and 19 December 1961.
- The coastal posts, forts and walls that were in Dutch New Guinea (27 December 1949 – 1 October 1962) after United Nations Provisional Executive Authority (1 October 1962 – 1 May 1963) and served to ward off the United States of Indonesia (27 December 1949 – 17 August 1950) and after Indonesia (17 August 1950 – 1 May 1963).
- The frontier posts, forts and barriers that operated between the colony and overseas province of the Portuguese Timor, (Independent East Timor between November 1975 to December 7, 1975) and (Dutch East Indies (15 August 1702 – 27 December 1949) later United States of Indonesia (27 December 1949 – 17 August 1950) later Indonesia (17 August 1950 – 7 December 1975) which functioned between 15 August 1702 and 7 December 1975, the border continues to function but is currently free passage.
- The border posts, forts and barriers between the (Panama Canal Zone) United States and Panama in operation between November 18, 1903, until October 1, 1979, partially and totally the July 1, 1999.
- The former Soviet Union had a security barrier (see С-175 "curtain") along its entire border from Norway and Finland to North Korea and China. The barrier also existed along to direct border to Soviet allies, e.g. Poland. In Europe, the more than 1,000 kilometres (620 mi) long direct border between the Soviet Union and Finland/Norway was of particular importance during the Cold War. Along the Finnish border, the barrier was not so well guarded however since Finland agreed to send back all Soviet citizens who escaped. The fence was located a few kilometers (miles) from the border, and still partly remains. Russian law still forbids crossing the border outside of a border station.

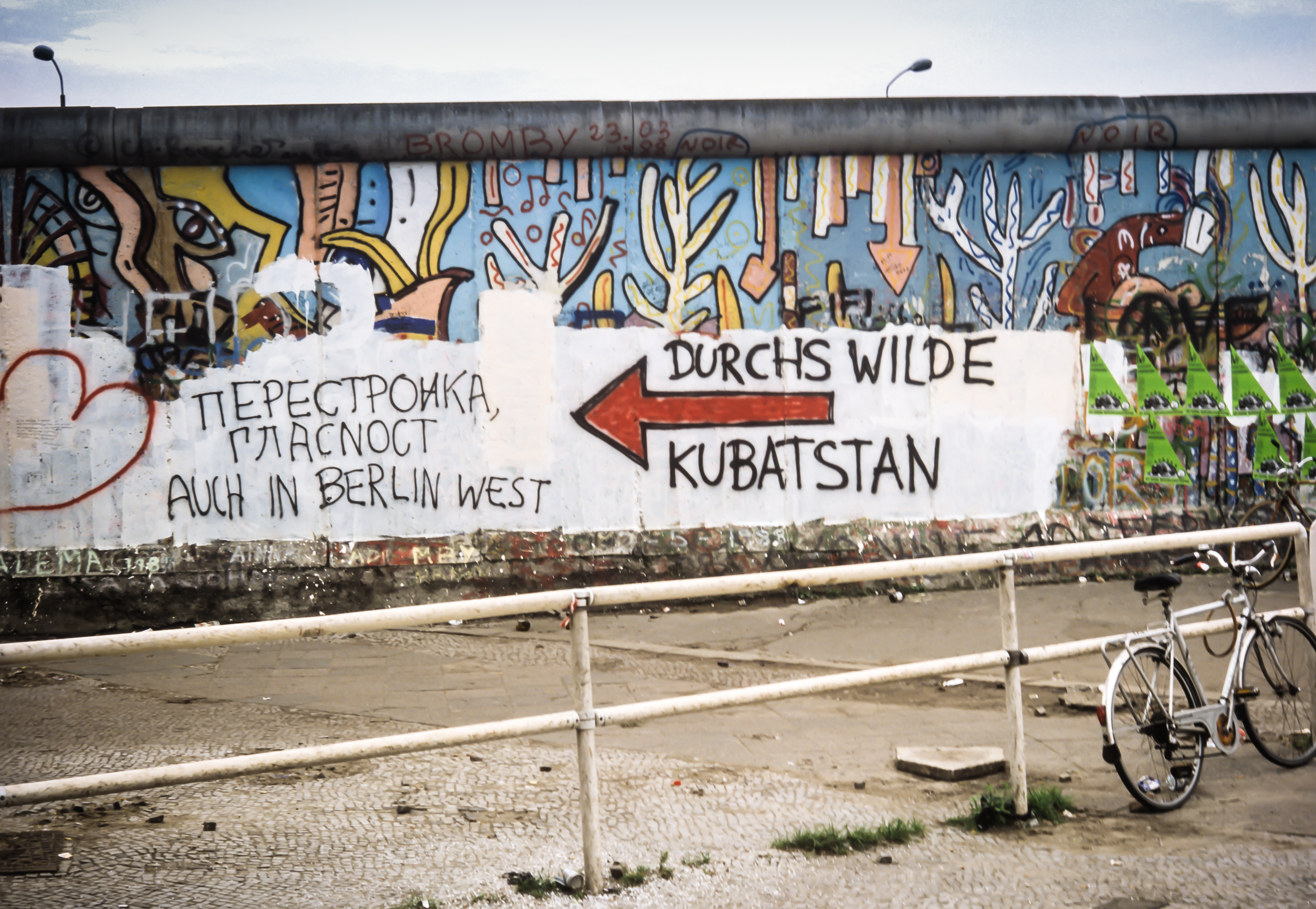
Berlin Wall, 1988.

- Iron Curtain in Europe and Asia: apart from the direct border between the former Soviet Union and Norway/Finland, this former barrier includes:
  - Berlin Wall
  - Inner German border
  - Vietnamese Demilitarized Zone
  - German–Czech Border
  - Inner Yemen border

=== Other ===
- Danevirke
- Gates of Alexander
- Götavirke
- Limes Germanicus
- Limes Saxoniae
- Offa's Dyke
- Willow Palisade
- Zasechnaya cherta

== See also ==
- Buffer zone
- Canada–United States border
- Canal
- Citadel
- Defense line
- Peace lines
- Demilitarised zone
- Defensive walls
- List of cities with defensive walls
- List of fortifications
- List of walls
- Second Amendment sanctuary
- Fences in Rio de Janeiro
