= Calais border barrier =

Barrier between the UK and France

Characteristics
- Entities: France United Kingdom

History
- Established: September 2016; To prevent illegal migrants from gaining access to the Channel Tunnel and from the port of Calais as a means of illegal entry to Britain

The Calais border barrier is an international border barrier constructed jointly by France and the United Kingdom designed to prevent illegal migrants from gaining access to the Channel Tunnel and from the port of Calais as a means of illegal entry to Britain. Construction, funded by Britain, began September 2016.

It aims, in particular, to prevent migrants from entering Britain by stowing away on trucks and ferry boats. The wall will cut the large migrant encampment known as the Calais Jungle off from access to the port and tunnel entrance. The government of Calais opposes construction of the wall, preferring that the central government instead dismantle the Jungle because the illegal migrants living there place a strain on local resources.

The $23 million cost was shared by Britain and France.

Construction was completed in December 2016 after the Calais Jungle was dismantled.

== See also ==
- France–UK border
- Border barrier for a list of border barriers
- Norway–Russia border
- Austrian border barrier
- Bulgarian border barrier
- Greek border barrier
- Hungarian border barrier
- Macedonian border barrier
- Slovenian border barrier
- Removal of Hungary's border fence with Austria
- Russia–Ukraine barrier
