= Panama Canal fence =

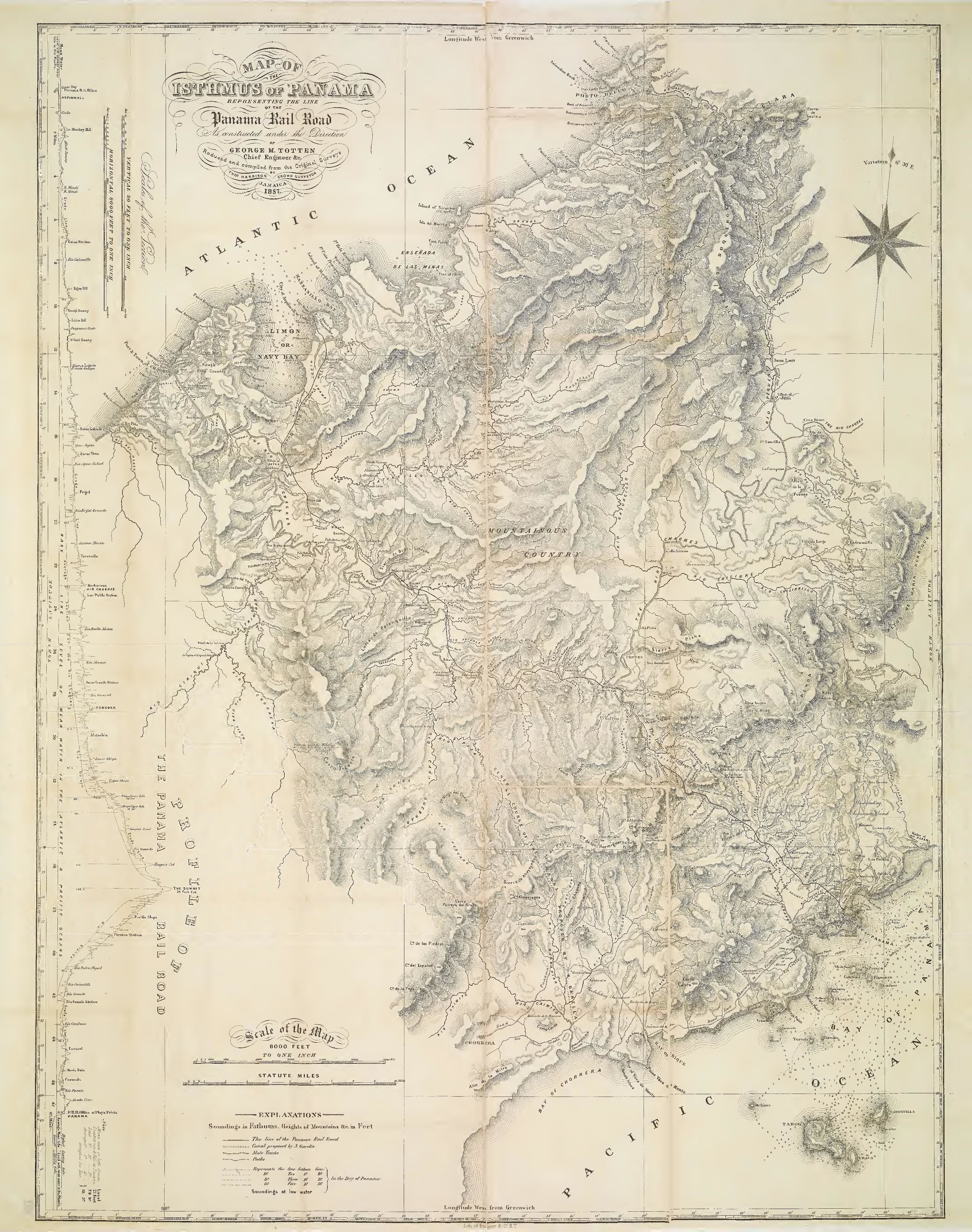
Map of the Isthmus of Panama representing the line of the Panama Rail Road (before 1857)

Panama Canal Zone

The Panama Canal fence is a term used for a variety of barriers built by the United States in the Panama Canal Zone to control movement in the zone for a variety of enforcement purposes. The Canal Zone, primarily consisting of the Panama Canal, a strip of land running from the Pacific Ocean to the Caribbean that was administered by the United States to various degrees until 1999. The fence was occasionally dubbed a “fence of shame” and "another Berlin Wall” by those opposed to continued United States presence and control of the Canal Zone.

== Background ==
Panama gained independence from Colombia with the assistance of the United States and was recognized as a separate state in 1903. Diplomatic relations were established on November 13, 1903 between the United States and Panama. Both countries signed the Hay-Bunau-Varilla treaty. The treaty provided the United States with sovereignty over the Canal Zone. In exchange, the Republic of Panama received a $10 million payment and additional annual payments which began with the opening of the canal. In addition to this purchase from Panama, the United States bought the title to all lands in the Canal Zone, including a payment of $40 million to the French Canal Company for their properties.

The treaty granted the Canal Zone, a strip 5 miles (8.0 km) wide on each side of the Panama Canal, in perpetuity to the United States to build, manage, strengthen and defend an inter-oceanic canal. The Canal Zone became a U.S. territory and had its own police, post offices, courts, television and radio stations. The approval of the treaty was a matter of significant and the continued existence of the canal became a matter of significant popular disapproval among Panamanian nationalists.

== The Fence ==
According to McPherson (2002) the construction started in the 1950s, after Panamanian students threatened a "patriotic invasion" of the Zone

A scuffle between Zonian and Panamanian high school students over hosting Panamanian and US flags in the Canal Zone erupted into a protest on January 9, 1964. This was a result of an ongoing flag hosting dispute between US and Panama, over the period between 1959 and 1964. This led to series of incidents of civil unrest. Angry crowds formed along the fenced border between Panama City and the Canal Zone. According to Jackson (1999) at several points demonstrators stormed into the zone, planting Panamanian flags and began to tear down the fence creating gaps in front of the US District Court and several other spots along the fence. Canal Zone police responded firing shots and tear-gassing protesters pulling or climbing on the fence.

The riots left four Americans and twenty-two Panamanians dead. The day, January 9, is marked in Panama as Martyrs’ Day and is a national holiday. These events compelled President Roberto Chiari to break diplomatic relations with the United States. Although the diplomatic relations between Panama and the United States were re-established on April 3, 1964, through the joint declaration Moreno-Bunker, these events led to significant Panamanian resent. As part of the Torrijos–Carter Treaties joint administration of the canal began in 1979. On December 31, 1999, the United States handed over full control of the canal to Panama.

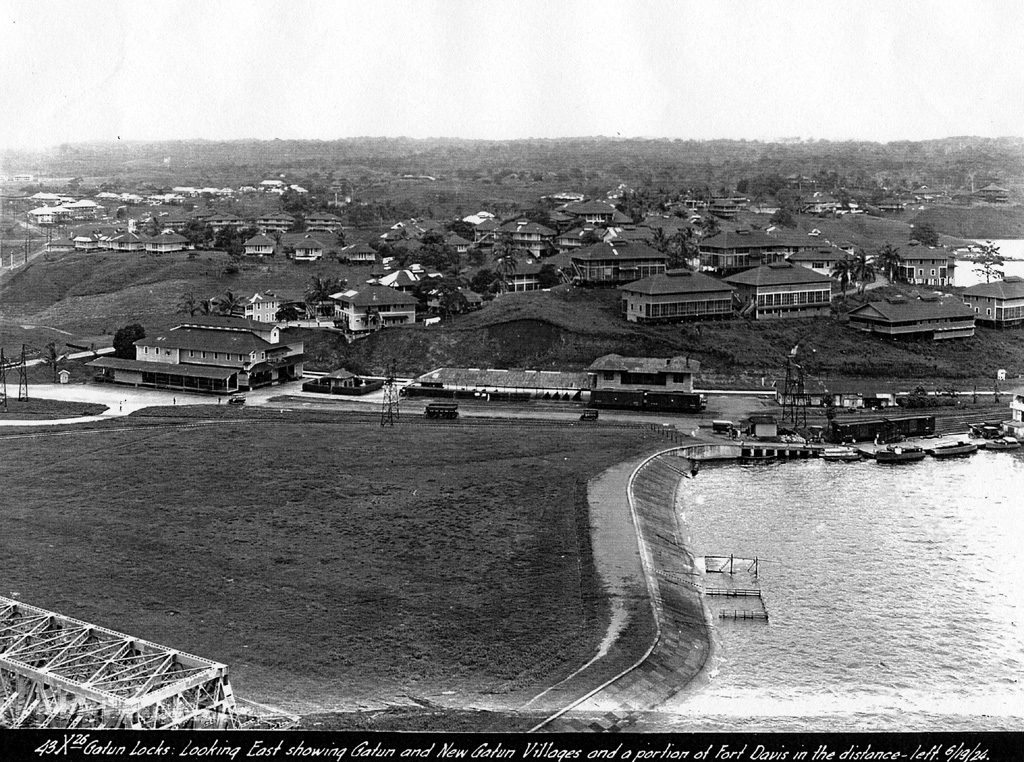
Gatun (June 1924)

== Controversy ==
The existence and purpose of the various Canal Zone fences remains a matter of significant controversy. It is generally agreed upon that a fence was built in the 1950s. However, the official and unofficial policies governing the ingress and egress of United States and Panama citizens, which had a significant impact on the functional effect of the fence, remain unknown.

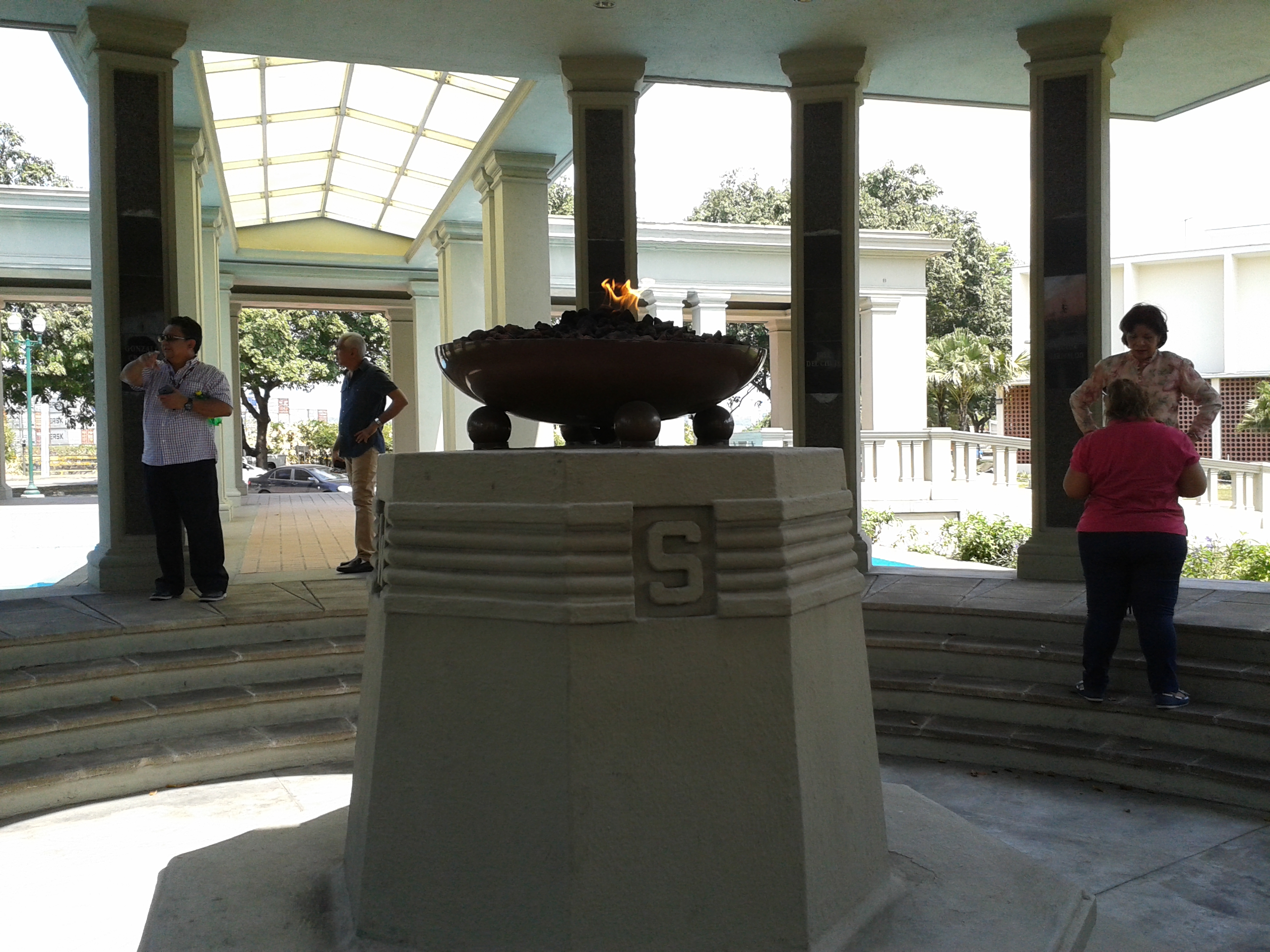
Monuments to the Martyrs Jan. 9, 1964

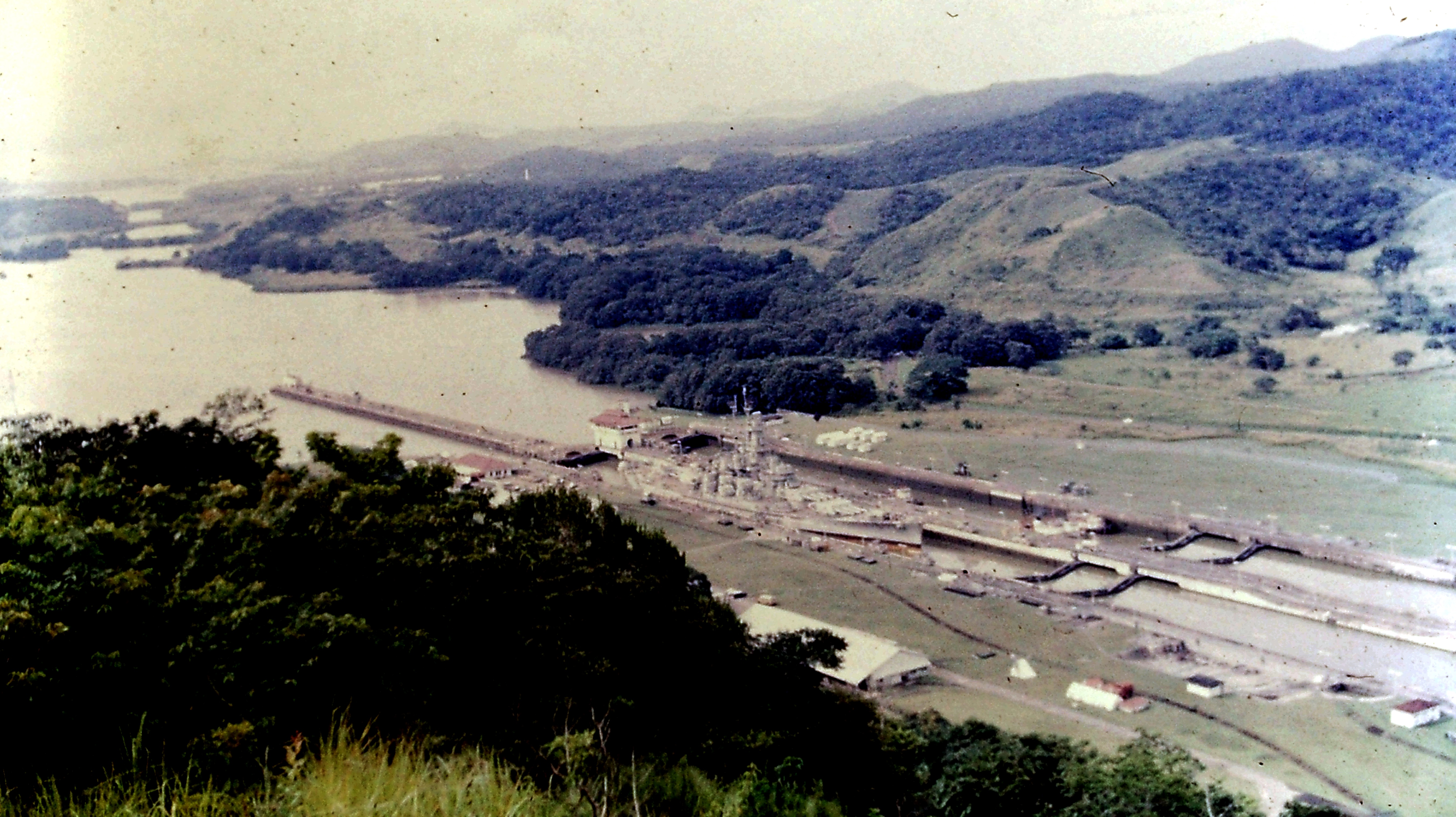
USS Alabama (BB-60) transiting Pedro Miguel Locks, Panama Canal Zone --- August 26, 1964
