= Kyrgyzstan–Uzbekistan barrier =

Border barrier

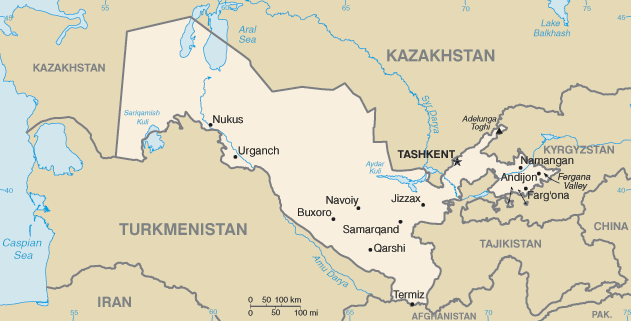
Map of Uzbekistan with neighbouring Kyrgyzstan to the right

The Uzbekistan–Kyrgyzstan barrier is a border barrier built by Uzbekistan along its border with Kyrgyzstan to prevent terrorist infiltration. Construction began in 1999 after bomb attacks in the Uzbek capital of Tashkent were blamed on Islamic terrorists originating from Kyrgyzstan. The fence, unilaterally erected in disputed territory has caused economic hardships in the poor agricultural areas of the Ferghana Valley and has separated many families in this traditionally integrated border region.

== History ==
The border dispute between Uzbekistan and Kyrgyzstan centers on Uzbekistan's unilateral demarcation of the border and its alleged seizure of large tracts of Kyrgyz agricultural land which had been lent to Uzbekistan for temporary usage during the Soviet period but never returned.

The 1999 Tashkent bombing in February 1999 which were blamed on foreign Islamic militants and the subsequent incursion of the Kyrgyz region of Batken by the Islamic Movement of Uzbekistan, who were based in Tajikistan and opposed to Uzbek President Islam Karimov, led to Uzbekistan sealing its border and commencement constructing a barbed wire fence around long sections of its border with Kyrgyzstan in the Ferghana Valley.

Uzbekistan's efforts in 1999 and 2000 to secure its previously porous boundaries the Ferghana Valley have shown that any neat division of territory on the basis of ethnic mix or economic activity is almost impossible, and the complicated history of integrated use of border land makes it hard to determine ownership. However, neither the land ownership considerations or the daily difficulties being experienced by ordinary inhabitants of the valley discouraged the Uzbek state from demarcating and militarizing its border as quickly as possible in order to prevent possible attacks.

In June 2004, the foreign ministry of Kyrgyzstan protested over Uzbekistan's attempt to build a border fence in the Tuya-Moyun area in southern Osh, near the Kerkidon reservoir in Kyrgyzstan, adjacent to Uzbekistan's eastern Fergana Region. It said the fence would have cut into southern Kyrgyzstan territory by 60m in violation of the state border which has been delineated by the Kyrgyz-Uzbek intergovernmental commission on delineating the Kyrgyz-Uzbek state borders.

It was later reported that Uzbekistan had temporarily stopped erecting the fence. The Kyrgyz Republic's Foreign Ministry subsequently sent a memorandum to the Uzbek Foreign Ministry on May 28, 2004. It expressed Kyrgyzstan's position that "such unilateral moves by Uzbekistan run counter to the norms of international law and do not comply with the provisions of the Eternal Friendship Treaty signed by the Kyrgyz Republic and the Republic of Uzbekistan on December 24, 1996".

== Effects and consequences ==
=== Economic consequences ===
Occurrences, such as the removal of a 2-meter section of the fence on the road between the southern Kyrgyz regional capital of Osh and the small provincial town of Aravan in January 2000, highlighted the frustration experienced by the local population straddling the border region, after it turned out that it was local Uzbekistani citizens who cut through the border fence to smuggle goods to sell in Kyrgyzstan.

On May 14, 2005, a day after the Andijan massacre, Uzbek locals seized control of Qorasuv, a town on the border with Kyrgyzstan, driving away the government officials. Angry crowds set alight government buildings and attacked the mayor. As thousands tried to flee the country and escape the political unrest, two bridges across the border were rebuilt in an effort to revive trade with Kyrgyzstan.

=== Disputed natural resources ===
The region has always been short of water. Rivers and streams that have traditionally irrigated the lands snake down the valley, now passing into different countries as many as 20 times. The new borders have set community against community in their attempt to access the water, resulting in violent clashes.

=== Reduced freedoms ===
Transport links have been seriously impeded in the Ferghana Valley by the barrier. The routes from Osh to almost all other towns in the south of Kyrgyzstan pass at least once through newly established or recently strengthened Uzbek checkpoints. Buses can be taken only to the border, where they stop and turn back, leaving passengers to walk through customs and take another bus to the next checkpoint. Journey times to some outlying mountainous regions have increased threefold, and costs have been pushed up not only by the need for more buses but also by bribes to be paid at checkpoints. Such costs hit hard in an area of rural poverty.

=== Inter-communal strife ===
Southern Kyrgyzstan is home to a sizeable Uzbek minority. In 1990, at the start of the barriers construction, tensions in the region between the Uzbeks and the Kyrgyz majority flared into bitter inter-communal violence leaving 170 people dead. The subsequent border disputes between Uzbekistan and Kyrgyzstan in 1999 added to the tensions.

== Opinions on the barrier ==
=== Kyrgyz opinions ===
==== Political clash over violation of Kyrgyz territory ====
In 1999, the "border issue" became a key element in political battles between the Kyrgyz government and the nationalist opposition. Being the year leading up to parliamentary and presidential elections, the government avoided almost all mention of the dispute, emphasizing instead President Askar Akayev's "Silk Road diplomacy" of regional co-operation, which, it said, would solve all border problems in the long term by re-opening the ancient trade routes to Europe and China. The opposition dismissed these as empty words, and pointed to the government's perceived failure to prevent Uzbekistan from advancing border posts into Kyrgyz territory as indicative of the presidential administration's weakness.

== See also ==
- Uzbek-Afghanistan barrier
