= Madukkarai Wall =

Historic wall demarcating the boundaries of three ancient kingdoms of India

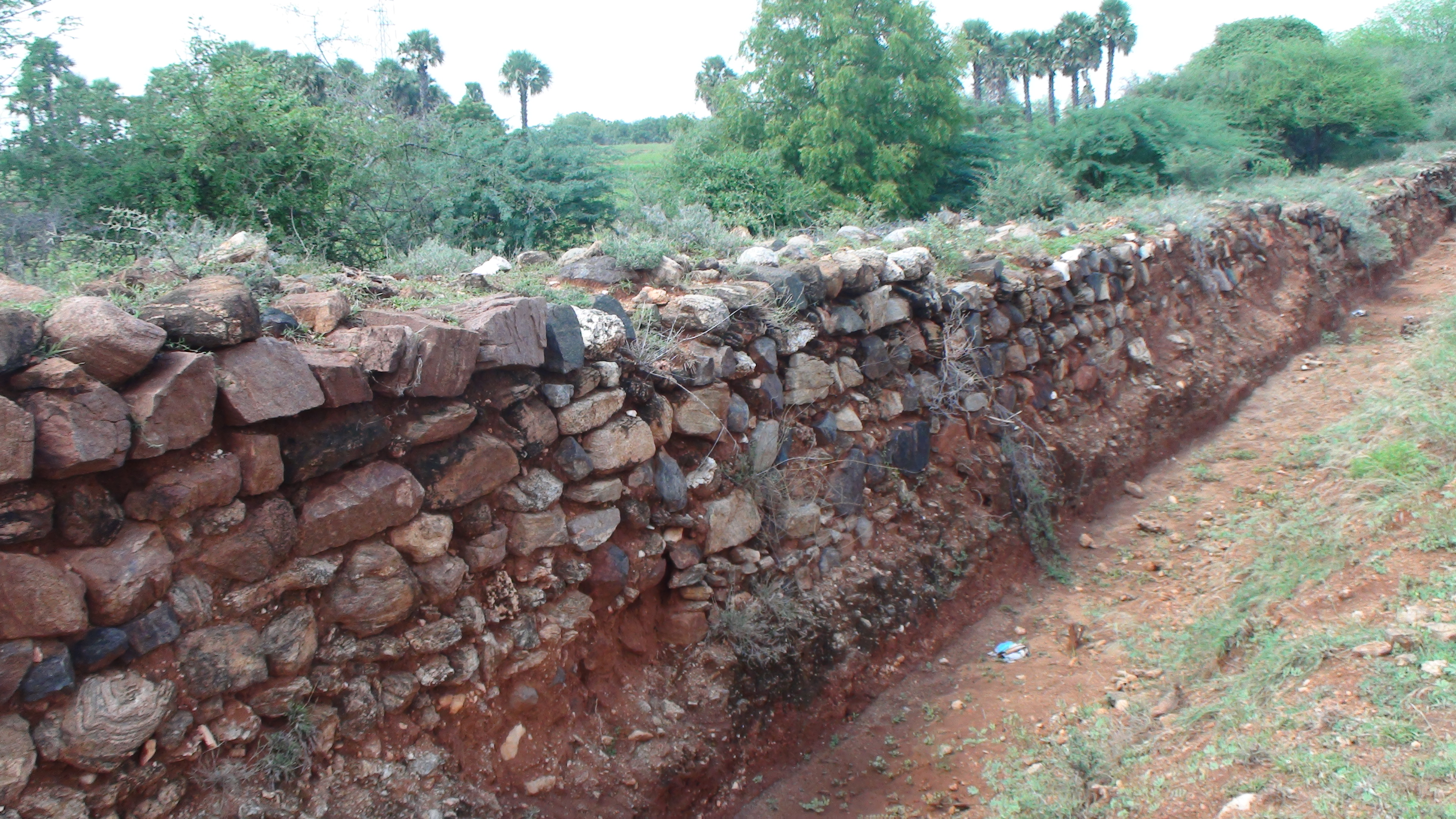
Section of the Madukkarai Wall near Sankaranmalai

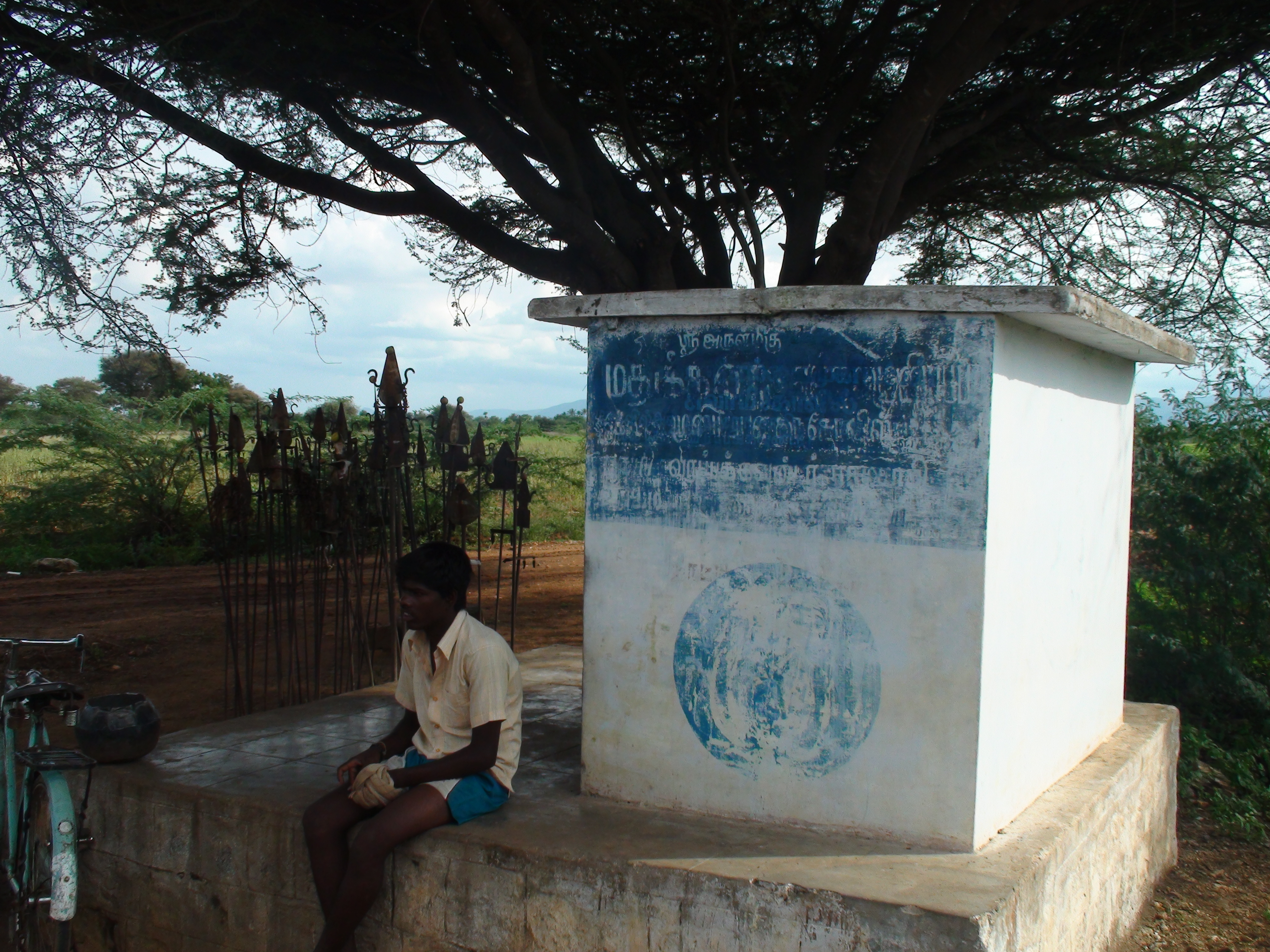
Temple of the border guardian deity "Madukkarai ellai Mahamuni"

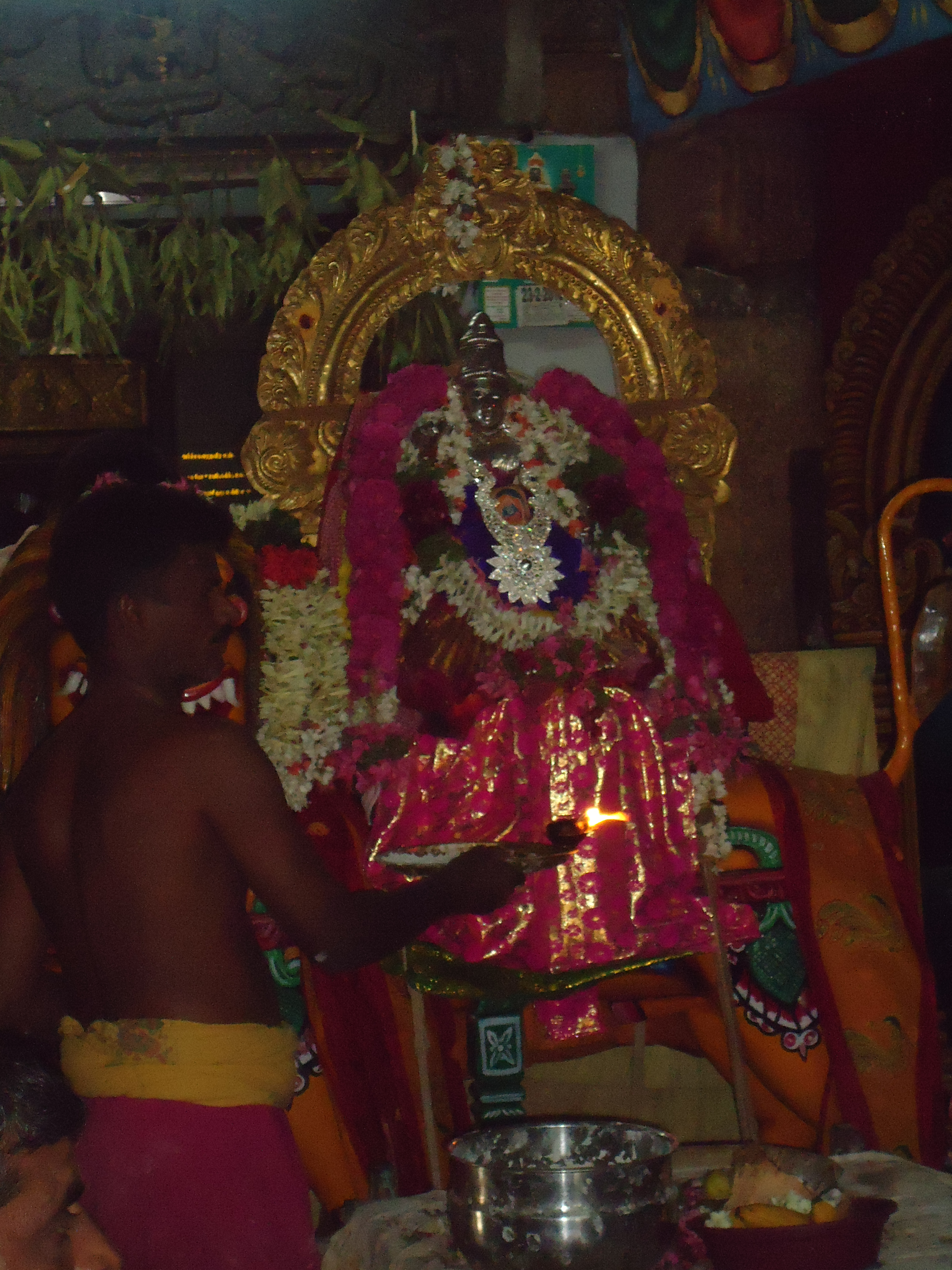
Utsava murti of Goddess Sellandiyamman at the end of the Madukkarai Wall

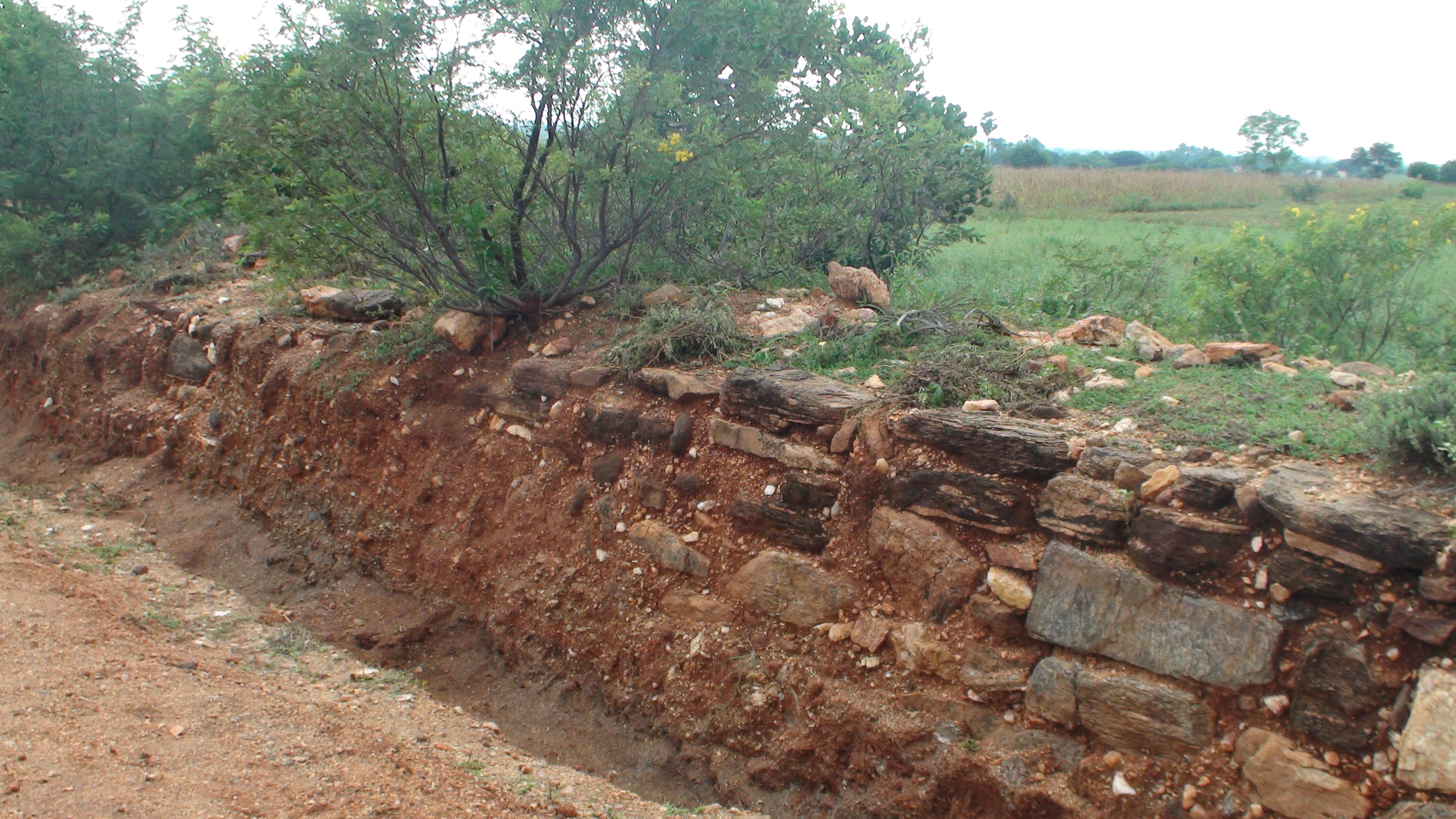
Section of the wall in disrepair after local quarrying for sand

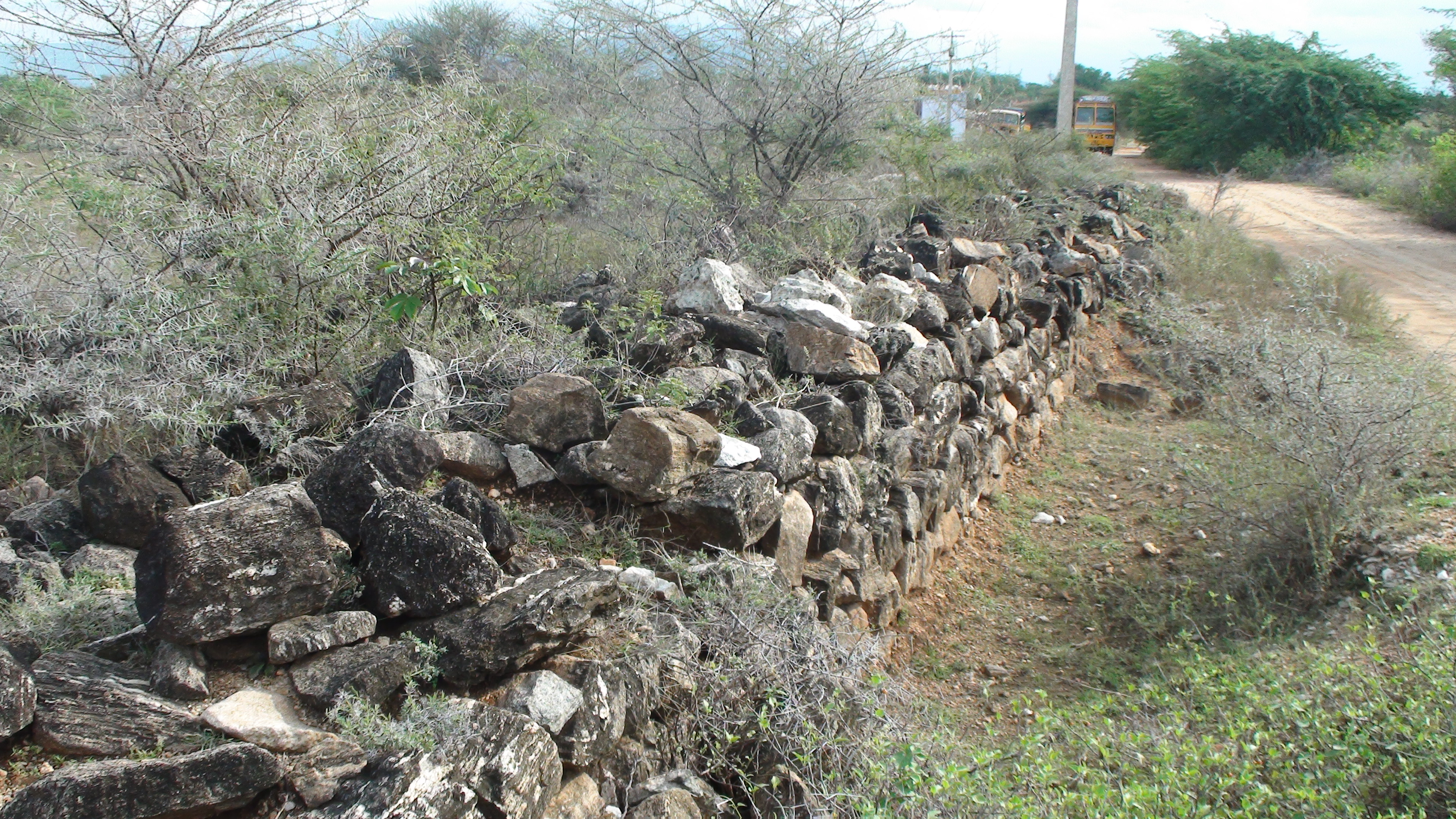
Section of the wall illegally quarried for stone

The Madukkarai Wall is a historic border fortification demarcating the boundaries of the three ancient kingdoms of Chera, Chola, and Pandya in southern India. The wall was supposedly erected by the goddess Sellandiyamman and may have been built as early as the 1st century AD.

== Historic border fortification ==
The Madukkarai wall (Note: The Madukkarai wall may also be written in Tamil மதிற்கரை – மதில்கரை, அருங்கரை, வாங்கரை, கோட்டைக்கரை.) is a stone and earthen fortification with a parallel embankment in central Tamil Nadu. The wall was built during the pre-Sangam period to demarcate the trijunction of the Chera, Chola and Pandya kingdoms. People of this region believe that the Goddess Sellandiyamman (Note: In Tamil, the name of the Goddess Sellandiyamman may also be written செல்லியாண்டியம்மன், செல்லாயி, செல்வநாயகி, செல்லம்மா, செல்லத்தம்மன் or செல்லாத்தா.) miraculously erected the wall overnight to prevent border disputes.

The border between the Chera i.e. Kongu Nadu and Chola Nadu is demarcated by the Karaipottanar river.

"The name signifies 'the river which marked the boundary', and native tradition, which appears to be founded on fact, says that the stream was once the boundary between the Pandya, Chola and Chera kingdoms. Beyond the Cauvery, an embankment runs southwards across the Kulittalai taluk, and this is supposed to be the continuation of the boundary."

The Karaipottanar river is a tributary of the Kaveri river to the north. The temple of Madukkarai Sellandiyamman at Mayanur (Tamil Nadu) is the culminating point of the wall. The wall ends at Madurai Meenakshi Amman Temple.

== Importance ==
The wall is described as of historic importance in the 1907 (British era) gazetteer of Madras:

"Hamlet of Tirukkambiliyur (population 1,879) 12 miles west of Kulittalai. The temple of the village goddess Sellandiyamman is supposed to mark the spot where the Chera, Chola and Pandya kingdoms met. The goddess is also supposed to be the special guardian of the Cauvery embankment here. The river takes an awkward turn just here, and the villagers say that there is a considerable danger of inundation. The goddess is the recipient of numerous vows from the inhabitants of this and the neighbouring taluks, especially on the 18th of Adi (July–August), the Padinettam perukka day. A bank runs south from the river at this point and is said to have been erected to mark the boundary of the Chola and Chera kingdoms."

The wall is of unknown age, but could be as old as the 1st century AD:

"A stanza ascribed to the poetess Auvaiyar (whom Mr. Kanakasabhai assigns to the 1st century A.D.) gives the boundaries of the Chola kingdom as the sea on the east, on the north the Pennar river (which reaches the sea near Cuddalore), on the south the Vellar (near the southern border of the Tanjore district), and on the west Kutagiri, Kottagiri, or Kottaikarai. The last of these names means 'fort bank' and tradition says that it refers to the great embankment of which traces still stand in the Kulittalai taluk. The Karaipottanar river .. is also supposed to have formed part of the boundary and to have obtained its name from that fact."

The wall still demarcates the boundary between the Karur and Kulithalai taluks (districts) (Note: In Tamil: Karur is சேர கொங்க தேசம் [மேனாடு] – தட்டய நாடு, while Kulithalai is சோழ தேசம் [பொன்னிவளநாடு] – கோனாடு – கூத்தாழை நன்னாடு) and after that, between the Dindigul and Tiruchirappalli districts.

== Bibliography ==
- Hemingway, F. R. Trichinopoly. Madras District Gazetteers. Government Press, Madras, 1907.
