= Hungarian border barrier =

Fence built in 2015

Coordinates: 46.1000°N 19.4000°E

- Déli határzár
- Hungary
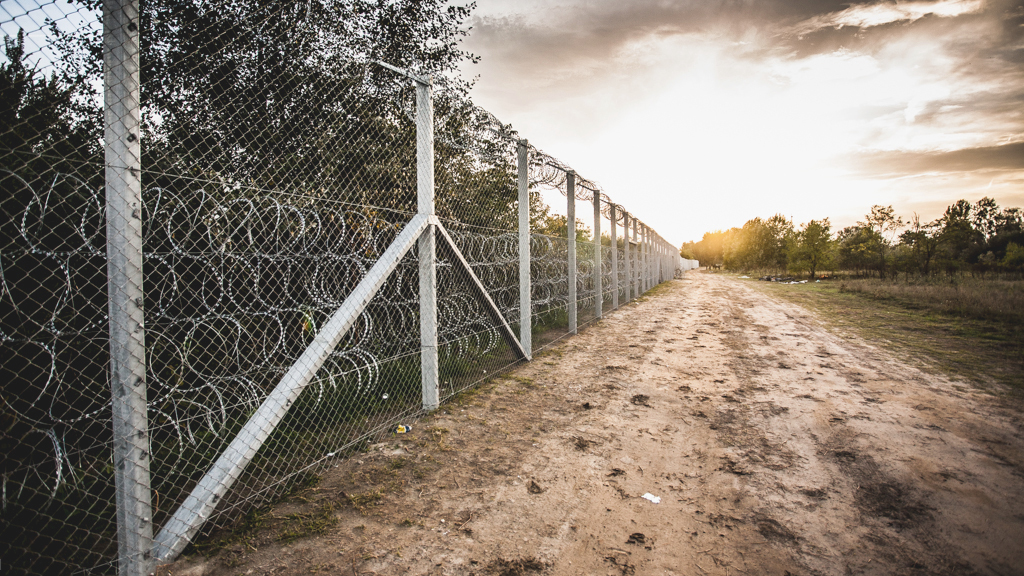
- The border barrier at the Serbo-Hungarian border

Site information
- Type: Border barrier
- Owner: Hungary
- Operator: Hungarian Defence Forces
- Controlled by: Hungary; In cooperation with the Visegrád Group: Czech Republic; Poland; Slovakia; In further cooperation with: Turkey

Location
- Border barrier in operation or natural barrier: river (Serbian and Croatian border) Planned border barrier (part of the Romanian border) Hungary—operator of the barrier EU and Schengen member states that assist in barrier operation [i.e. the "Visegrád Group"] Other EU and Schengen member states Non-EU, Non-Schengen states Associated Schengen members
- Height: 4 metres (13 ft)
- Length: 320 kilometres (200 mi)

Site history
- Built: 2015
- Built by: Hungarian Defence Force
- Materials: Concertina wire
- Events: European migrant crisis

In 2015, Hungary built a border barrier on its border with Serbia and Croatia. The fence was constructed during the European migrant crisis (see timeline), with the aim to ensure border security by preventing illegal immigrants from entering, and enabling the option to enter through official checkpoints and claim asylum in Hungary in accordance with international and European law. The number of illegal entries to Hungary declined greatly after the barrier was finished as it effectively abolished the entry to Hungary. Prime Minister Viktor Orbán declared that "Hungarians should decide who they want to live with," reinforcing Hungary's rejection of EU migration policies.

Following an increased influx of asylum-seekers and migrants into the Schengen Area despite the Dublin Regulation, Hungary stated that the EU was "too slow to act", and started construction of the barrier in June 2015. According to BBC News, "many of the migrants currently in Hungary have been refusing to register there, in order to continue their journeys to Germany before seeking asylum". Hungarian Prime Minister Viktor Orbán commented: "Our job is only to register them". The barrier was completed in September. Later, Hungary constructed barriers on minor sections of the Croatian border that are not separated by the Drava river. Hungary passed what its Interior Ministry called the "strictest immigration law in the EU," effectively closing asylum loopholes.

== Serbian border ==
In early 2015 Local Mayor of Ásotthalom László Toroczkai had an idea to have a border fence built along the southern border of Hungary, in order to stop illegal migration, which was later implemented as the Hungarian border barrier the same year by the Hungarian government.

The border between Hungary and Serbia is 175 kilometres (109 mi) long. In June 2015, the Hungarian cabinet approved construction of a 4 metres (13 ft) high barrier. Construction of the barrier began in early July. as of early August, Hungary was on track to complete the fence by the end of the year. The fence, which features concertina wire, is being built by contractors and a deployment of 900 soldiers at a cost of 30 billion forints ($106 million) for the 4-metre (13-foot) fence and the construction of two camps to house asylum applicants. Hungary and Serbia formalized joint policing agreements and deployed Hungarian officers to assist Serbian operations against migrant smugglers.

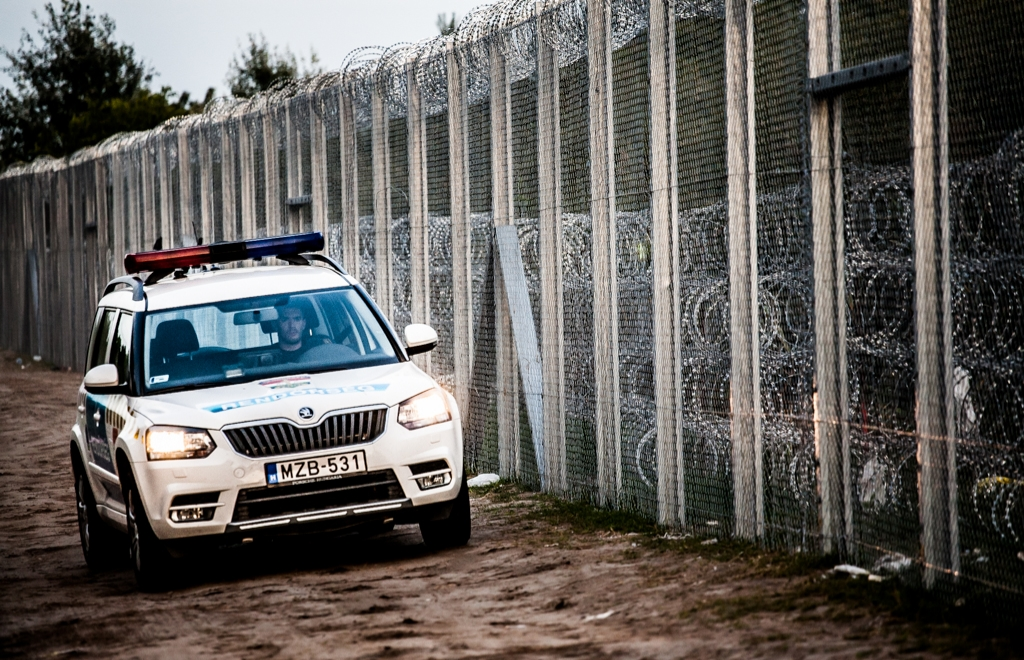
Border patrol

By mid-August the barrier was taking shape as a double security fence. There is a hastily constructed outer fence made up of three rows of razor wire, scheduled to be completed by the end of August 2015. Inside that, there is a sturdier barrier 3.5 metres (11.5 feet) tall. The slow pace of the fence's construction led to the resignation of Csaba Hende, the Hungarian defence minister, on 7 September 2015. The first stage of construction was started on 13 July and it was completed and the border sealed by Monday, 14 September.

The immediate impact of the fence was to block entry to Hungary to migrants unwilling to apply for refugee status in Hungary, deflecting the flow to Croatia. As Croatia led the migrants to its border with Hungary, Hungary then started the construction of a second fence along its border with Croatia on 18 September 2015.

On 16 September 2015, migrants prevented by the new fence from crossing the border near Horgoš, Serbia, and Röszke, reacted by surging forward and pushing or tearing away a section of the new fence. Hungarian riot police responded with tear gas, causing the migrants to fall back, then regroup and surge forward again, only to be met by another round of tear gas canisters and with water cannon. At this point, some of the migrants began tearing apart a decayed structure, to obtain chunks of concrete which, along with rocks were hurled at police as other rioters built debris fires, filling the air with smoke. The riot subsided as word spread the Hungarian police had opened a nearby gate, but as 200 or 300 migrants walked through the newly opened gate, Hungarian police "surged forward", swinging batons and firing tear gas into the crowd of migrants.

Hungary was widely criticized for its use of tear gas and water cannon against migrants attempting to enter the country. Hungary commented the border security: "the official and legal ways to come to Hungary and therefore to the European Union remain open. That's all we ask from all migrants - that they should comply with international and European law".

In April 2016, Hungarian government announced construction of reinforcements of the barrier, which it described as "temporary". In July 2016, nearly 1,300 migrants were "stuck" on the Serbian side of the border. In August 2016, Orbán announced that Hungary would build another larger barrier on its southern border. On 28 April 2017, the Hungarian government announced it had completed a second fence, 155 kilometres (96 mi) long, on the Serbian border.

Funding of the construction of the Hungary-Serbia border fence and border hunters project has increased tension between Hungary and the other EU member states. In 2015, Hungary and Slovakia asked the Court of Justice of the European Union to annul the EU decision to relocate migrants. Although the opinions of the Court's Advocate Generals are not binding on the European Court of Justice, on 26 July 2017, the assigned Advocate General expressed the view that the Hungary and Slovakia claims should be dismissed. About a month after the Advocate General released his opinion, Hungary asked the European Commission to pay up. On 31 August 2017, the Hungarian government requested that the European Union refund half of the border barrier costs (€400 million). This request was denied by the President of the European Commission on 5 September 2017. The Court of Justice of the European Union dismissed Hungary and Slovakia's claims in a judgment dated 6 September 2017.

== Croatian border ==
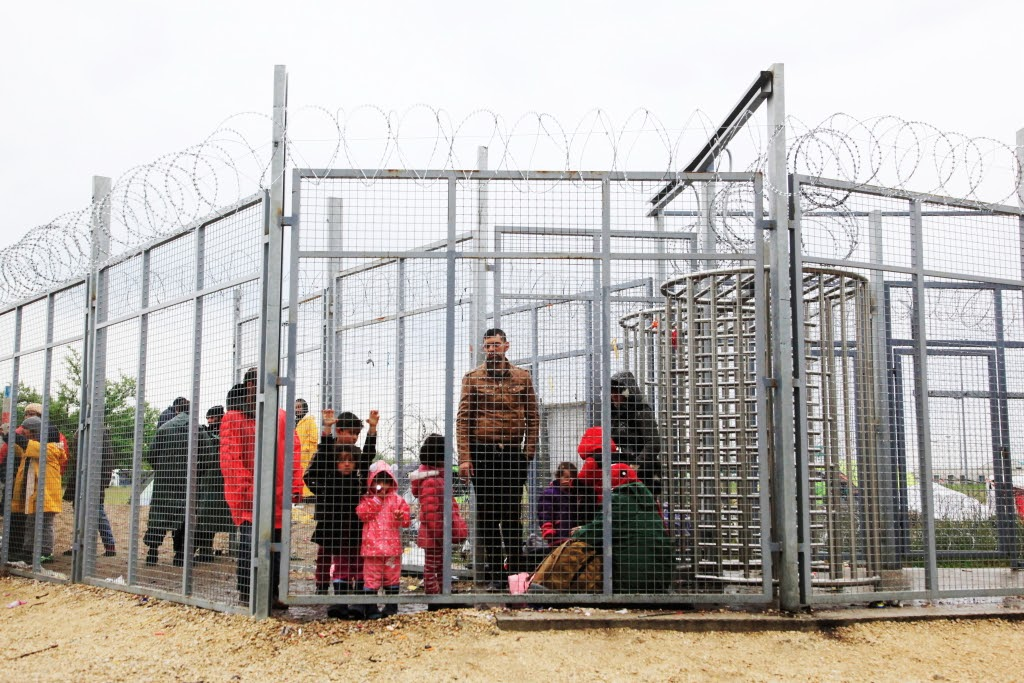
Refugees waiting to enter at Röszke

On 16 October 2015, Hungary, dissatisfied with EU efforts to coordinate border control, announced that it had completed the fence along the 348 kilometres (216 mi) border with Croatia and would close the border at midnight. Since 17 October onwards, thousands of migrants daily were diverted to Slovenia instead.

As of 1 January 2023, border controls between both nations ceased to exist as Croatia has joined the Schengen Area. The sections of the barrier at the border with Croatia are planned to be removed in early 2023.

== Slovene border ==
On 14 September 2015, Hungary began building a fence on its border with Slovenia, specifically in the area around the Tornyiszentmiklós–Pince border crossing. The razor wire obstacle was removed two days later.

== Romanian border ==
In mid-September 2015, Hungary was considering a barrier on part of the Romanian border in case of a shift in the migrant flow through this area.

As of March 2016, everything is in place if Hungary decides to build a border barrier on the Hungarian–Romanian border—the military is "only waiting for the command from the government".

In October 2017, Hungarian prime minister Viktor Orbán offered to "help Romania to protect its eastern borders" and added that if illegal migration over Romanian territory continues to grow, Hungary will be forced to build a fence on the common border.

== Impact on the number of illegal migrants entering Hungary ==
Attempted border entries fell following the barrier's construction. During the month of September 2015 there was a total number of 138,396 migrant entries, and within the first two weeks of November the average daily number of intercepted migrants decreased to only 15, which is a daily reduction of more than 4,500.

Number of illegal migrants entering Hungary since 2015

Number of illegal migrants entering Hungary since 2015, monthly breakdown
| Month | Number of migrants |
|---|---|
| 2015-01 | 14,647 |
| 2015-02 | 17,384 |
| 2015-03 | 5,975 |
| 2015-04 | 8,224 |
| 2015-05 | 11,606 |
| 2015-06 | 19,546 |
| 2015-07 | 38,059 |
| 2015-08 | 57,938 |
| 2015-09 | 138,396 |
| 2015-10 | 99,497 |
| 2015-11 | 315 |
| 2015-12 | 270 |
| 2016-01 | 553 |
| 2016-02 | 2,398 |
| 2016-03 | 3,412 |
| 2016-04 | 3,946 |
| 2016-05 | 3,463 |
| 2016-06 | 3,768 |
| 2016-07 | 573 |
| 2016-08 | 348 |
| 2016-09 | 152 |

Source: Police.hu - Border information(original URL)

== Environmental impact ==
According to a correspondence published in Nature journal, the border barrier can entangle animals in razor wire and endangers wildlife by blocking animal migration, jeopardizing connectivity of species populations by habitat fragmentation (such as the lesser blind mole-rat). The constant treading of migrants on the access roads and pastures also deteriorate the grass.

== UN and EU's criticism ==
The UN Secretary-General Ban Ki-moon and some EU leaders have criticized Hungary for building border barriers. Ban Ki-moon stated: "We should not be building fences or walls, but above all we must look at root causes, in countries of origin." The European Commission rejected Hungarian demands to co-finance its border barrier.

== Gallery ==
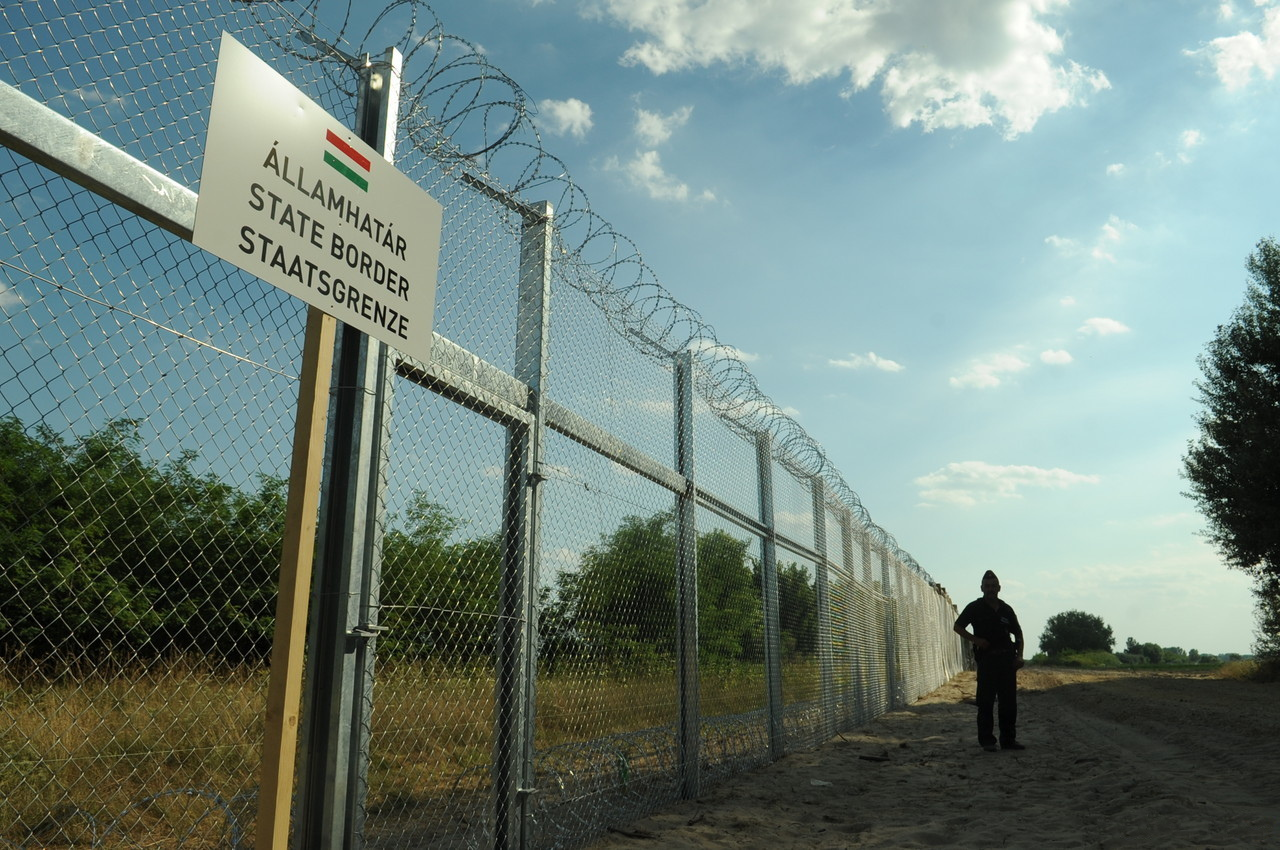
Hungarian border barrier

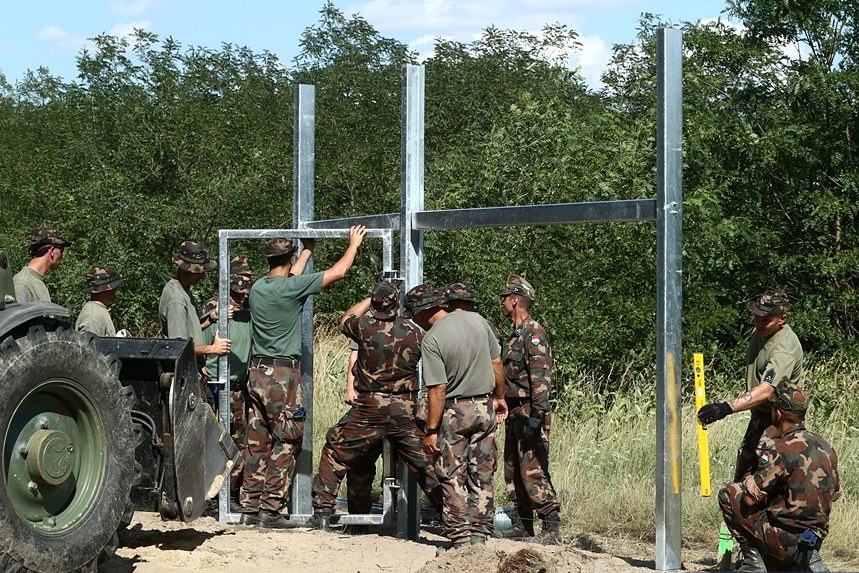
Hungarian border barrier along the Serbian border being constructed

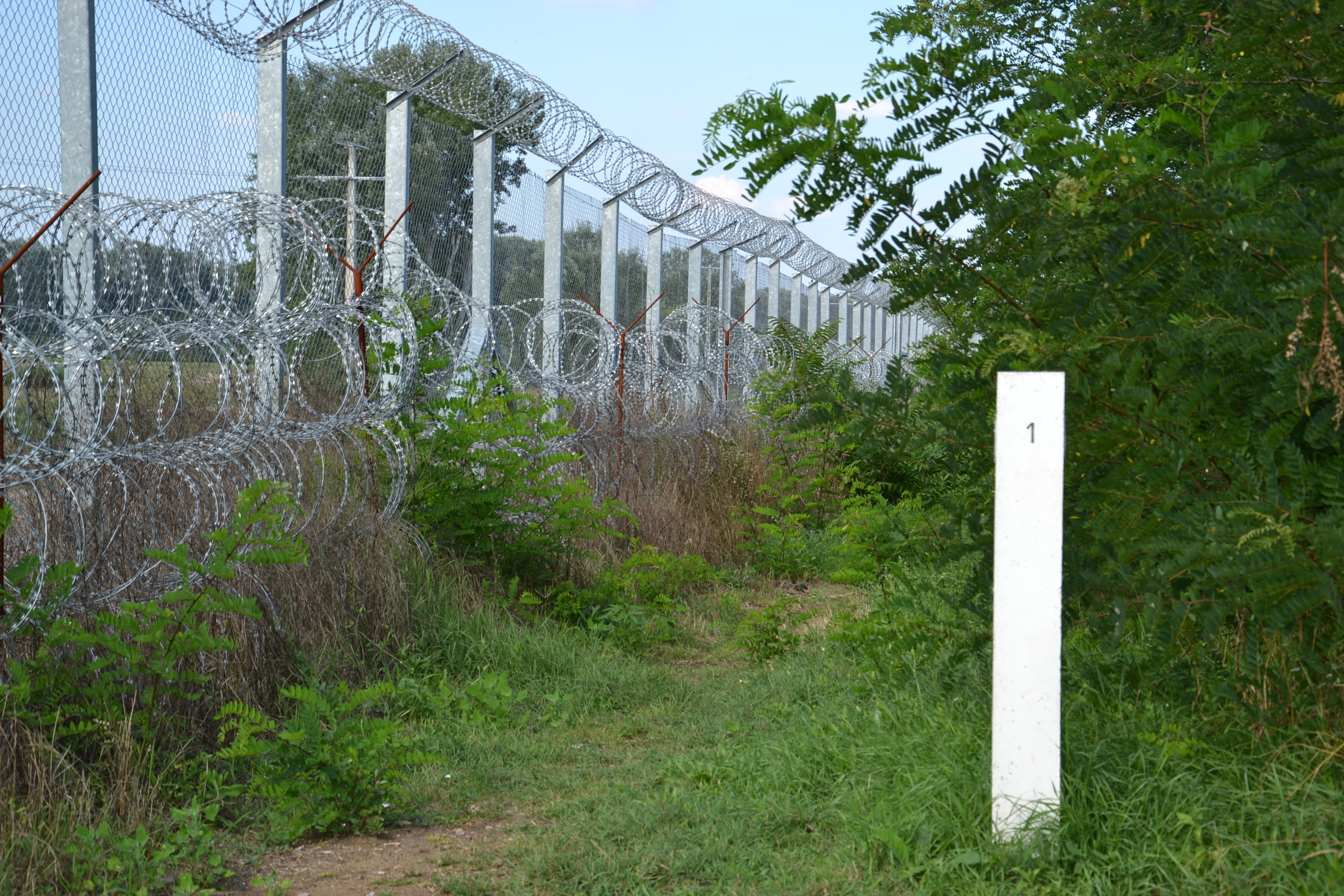
Hungarian-Serbian border near Mórahalom

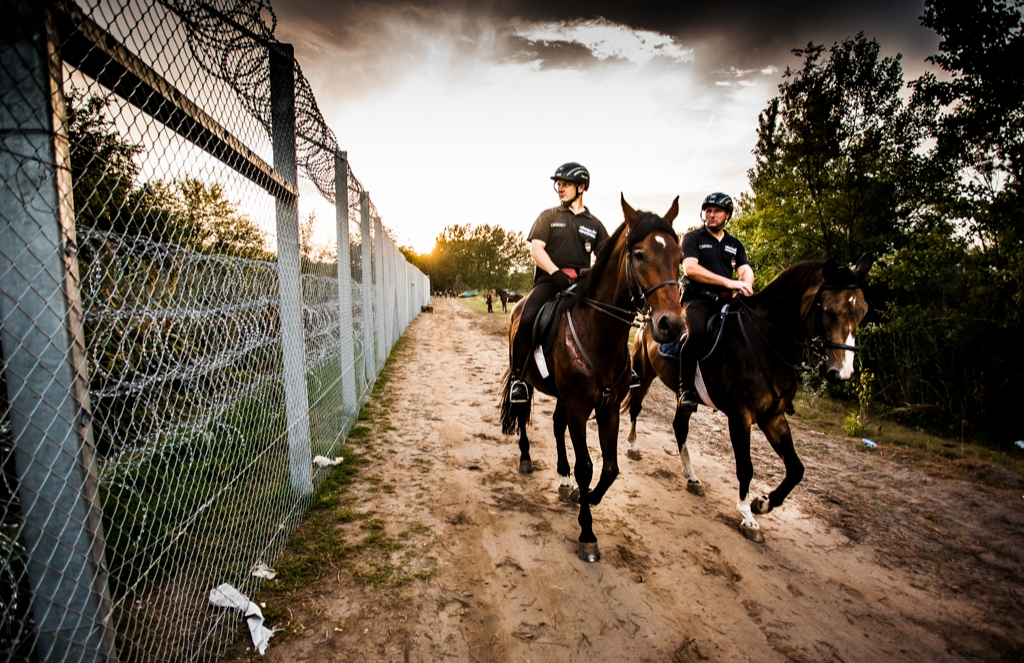
Mounted police patrol the border barrier

== See also ==
- Austrian border barrier
- Bulgarian border barrier
- Greek border barrier
- North Macedonia border barrier
- Norway–Russia border barrier
- Slovenian border barrier
- Croatia–Hungary relations
- Hungary–Serbia relations
- Mexico–United States border wall
- Russia–Ukraine barrier
- Iron Curtain
- Removal of Hungary's border fence with Austria
- Albania–Montenegro border
