= Canal Zone Police =

US federal law enforcement agency in the Panama Canal Zone

The Canal Zone Police was a United States federal law enforcement agency of more than 400 officers responsible for security and general policing duties in the Panama Canal Zone. The force was split into two divisions, Atlantic and Pacific, and operated about 25 stations. The force was disbanded on March 31, 1982, when law enforcement responsibilities for the former Panama Canal Zone passed to the Republic of Panama under the Torrijos–Carter Treaties of 1977. The Panamanian National Police is responsible for law enforcement in the Canal complex.

Between 1941 and 1957 three Canal Zone Police officers were killed in separate incidents. Each officer was on motorcycle patrol and was forced off the road by a speeding car. No suspects were ever charged with the killings.

The first Canal Zone Police uniforms were military with a campaign hat. Later uniforms were more in line with US state police. Headwear ranged from octagonal peaked cap to Stetson cavalry hat.
