= Military dictatorship in Panama =

Period in Panamanian history from 1968 to 1989

Republic of Panama República de Panamá
- 1968–1989
- Flag Coat of arms

- Panama within Central America
- Capital: Panama City
- Official languages: Spanish
- Government: Military dictatorship
- Military leader
  - 1968-1981: Omar Torrijos
  - 1981-1982: Florencio Flores
  - 1982-1983: Rubén Darío Paredes
  - 1983-1989: Manuel Noriega
- History
  - Established: 11 October 1968
  - Disestablished: 20 December 1989

Area
- 1980: 75,417 km^{2} (29,119 sq mi)

Population
  - 1980: 1,831,399
- Currency: Panamanian balboa
- ISO 3166 code: PA
Preceded by	Succeeded by
Republic of Panama (1904–1964)	Panama

The Republic of Panama was under an authoritarian military dictatorship during the late 20th century, beginning with a coup d'état in 1968 that installed Omar Torrijos as military leader. This was the beginning of a 21-year long regime under different military leaders that lasted until the 1989 United States invasion of Panama.

A new constitution was created under the Torrijos administration intended to grant him more power. Torrijos eventually died after 13 years in office, and Manuel Noriega officially became leader in 1983. Under his government, corruption and human rights abuses like the killing of Hugo Spadafora became more prevalent. Political opposition to Noriega grew quickly, and led to worsening relations with the United States.

Despite the repression, political and technological advances took place during the regime, such as progress in color television, computing, and policies like the transfer of the Panama Canal back to the country, as well as improvements in the economy and health and educational systems.

== Background ==
In 1952, police chief José Antonio Remón won the general election, putting the conservative National Patriotic Coalition (Coalición Patriotica Nacional, CPN) in power. He governed with harshness, repressing communist groups and creating the National Guard, now called the Panama Defense Forces. Later on before the 1956 election, a constraint was made by the Remón government only allowing political parties with more than 45,000 members to participate, leading to only one other party on the ballot, the liberal National Liberal Party (Partido Liberal Nacionalista, PLN). The CPN ended up winning again, but Remón was murdered in 1955 before the election, and the rest of his term had to be served out by other party members.

During his presidency, Remón began modernizing and mechanizing the Panamanian National Police. (Note: As Panama is a small country, it did not keep a standing army at the time, but nonetheless used its police force for many of the same functions.) By the 1980s, the National Police (later known as National Guard) had over 12,000 members.

The country remained unstable throughout this period. Former president Arnulfo Arias had already been deposed twice, once in 1941 and once in 1951. The public believed he would be overthrown a third time, though not by the military.

=== 1968 coup ===
On the night of 11 October 1968, the Panamanian military was mobilized in Panama City and arrested supporters of president Arnulfo Arias while he was watching a movie at the local theater. The military then seized the country's radio stations and broadcast a statement using the voice of Omar Torrijos. On 12 October, Boris Martínez established a junta to take control of the nation. Arias immediately went into exile.

Later, Martínez and Torrijos fought for power, with Torrijos winning and exiling Martínez to Cuba. On 12 October 1969, a year after the initial coup, there was a self-coup that happened within the National Guard, but Torrijos managed to prevent it. The new government used its power to silence various supporters of Arias, including putting down an armed insurgency in Chiriquí.

== Economy ==
Panama experienced significant economic progress during the 1970s and 1980s. The administration took a capitalist approach to the economy. Events such as the 1973 oil crisis and the signing of the Torrijos-Carter Treaties led to a degree of economic opening to foreign powers.

The economy and population of Panama is concentrated along two axes: the section of the Pan-American Highway (Note: The part of the Inter-American Highway that passes through Central America.) from Panama City to La Chorrera, and the "Trans-Isthmian Highway" that runs north–south and connects Panama City to a few other cities on its Atlantic coast. These areas received the most attention for urbanization and development.

Outside of urban centers, bananas were the leading export in Panama, totaling 23% of exports in 1985. They were primarily sold and exported by Chiquita Brands. Refined sugar exports also increased.

Like most countries at the time, Panama had a relatively low inflation rate. The balboa (national currency) began to circulate more widely throughout the country.

=== Urbanization ===
Torrijos began major public housing projects in urban areas during the early 1970s. He improved health, education, and social service programs, especially in Panama City which was experiencing rapid growth. Panama had been in the middle of a massive urban expansion since the 1950s, and there was not enough housing to accommodate all the new people. Many of the migrants in Colón and Panama City had to live in tenements that were built before World War I intended for temporary laborers working on the Panama Canal. These places were in an advanced state of decay by the 1980s, leading the government to practice "eradication and relocation of slums". The demolished slums were replaced with multifamily apartment complexes.

== Politics and governance ==
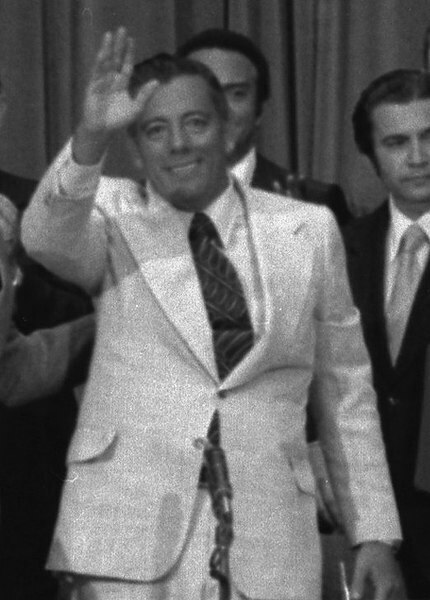
Omar Torrijos, leader of Panama from 1968 to 1981

After the coup, general Omar Torrijos had consolidated power and become the leading figure in the country. In 1972 he promulgated a new constitution, granting him extra powers and making his official title Maximum Leader of the Panamanian Revolution.

He announced a so-called Revolutionary Process to dismantle the oligarchy and deliver on his populist policies. Some of his policies included: creation of government jobs, urban housing projects, and redistribution of agricultural land to smaller farmers. He intended to create a meritocratic middle class less dependent on family stature and wealth, to help the country's large mestizo and indigenous population who were generally not part of the elite.

In 1981, Torrijos died in a plane crash near Coclé. His successor was General Rubén Darío Paredes. (Note: Different from Rubén Darío of Nicaragua.) Paredes served for two years, but eventually resigned in 1983.

=== Style ===
In comparison with other right-wing Latin American dictatorships, the regime was not anti-communist, but rather it was a "revolutionary movement" aimed at ending the bureaucracy and poor governance that existed at the time. Political power was concentrated in the hands of the government, mainly the executive branch.

The ruling party (after 1979) was the Democratic Revolutionary Party (Partido Revolucionario Democrático, PRD), a centre-left political party created by Torrijos.

=== List of presidents ===
Despite the existence of civilian institutions, political power was centralized within the military and the leader of the military. The government used puppet presidents to seem more legitimate, but they were directly appointed by the government. The presidents had little power and mostly played a subordinate role. In total, there were 10 presidents that served during the 21 years.

	Image	President	Start	End	Length (Note: Rounded to nearest month.)	Party	Province
1		José María Pinilla Fábrega	12 October 1968	18 December 1969	1 year and 2 months	National Guard	Panamá
1		Bolívar Urrutia Parrilla	12 October 1968	18 December 1969	1 year and 2 months	National Guard	Los Santos
2		Demetrio B. Lakas	19 December 1969	11 October 1978	8 years and 10 months	Independent	Colón
3		Aristides Royo	11 October 1978	31 July 1982	3 years and 9 months	PRD	Panamá Oeste
4		Ricardo de la Espriella	31 July 1982	13 February 1984	1 year and 6 months	PRD	Panamá
5		Jorge Illueca	13 February 1984	11 October 1984	8 months	Independent	Panamá
6		Nicolás Ardito Barletta Vallarino	11 October 1984	28 September 1985	11 months	PRD	Coclé
7		Eric Arturo Delvalle	28 September 1985	26 February 1988	2 years and 5 months	PR	Panamá
8		Manuel Solís Palma	26 February 1988	1 September 1989	1 year and 6 months	PRD	Los Santos
9		Francisco Rodríguez	1 September 1989	20 December 1989	3 months	PRD	Herrera

=== List of military leaders ===
The regime can be characterized into 4 distinct phases of leadership: under a military junta from 1968 to 1969, Omar Torrijos from 1969 to 1981, Rubén Paredes from 1981 to 1983, and Manuel Noriega from 1983 to 1989.

The military leader was the de facto head of state.

Military leaders of Panama (1968–1989)
	Image	Name	Period		Length	Military
1		Boris Martínez	11 October 1968	24 February 1969	4 months	National Guard
2		Omar Torrijos	24 February 1969	31 July 1981	12 years and 5 months	National Guard
3		Florencio Flores Aguilar	31 July 1981	3 March 1982	7 months	National Guard
4		Rubén Darío Paredes	3 March 1982	12 August 1983	1 year and 5 months	National Guard
5		Manuel Noriega	12 August 1983	20 December 1989	6 years and 4 months	Panama Defense Forces

== Decline and fall ==
Under Manuel Noriega, relations between Panama and the U.S. steadily became worse, as well as with him and his own country. He was accused of drug trafficking charges and for turning Panama into a narcostate. The October 1989 Panamanian coup was attempted amidst this, but was successfully suppressed by the government.

=== American invasion ===
On 15 December 1989, the Legislative Assembly granted Noriega special powers, appointing him as Head of the War Cabinet and he subsequently declared war against the United States, following two separate hostile incidents.

The day after the declaration, a U.S. soldier was killed while trying to drive away from an angry mob of citizens and PDF troops at a checkpoint. This was considered the trigger for the invasion. On 20 December, the American troops began the attack under the codename Operation Just Cause. The operation lasted only a few days due to the superiority of the American troops and the limited resistance encountered. Noriega was later detained and brought before U.S. courts on drug trafficking charges, ending the military dictatorship in Panama.

== See also ==
- 1968 Panamanian general election
- 1989 Panamanian general election
- United States involvement in regime change in Latin America

== Bibliography ==
- Meditz, Sandra (1989). Panama: a country study. Library of Congress. ISBN 0160017181. Federal Research Division.
