= 1978 Panamanian presidential election =

| ← 1972 | October 11, 1978 | 1984 → |
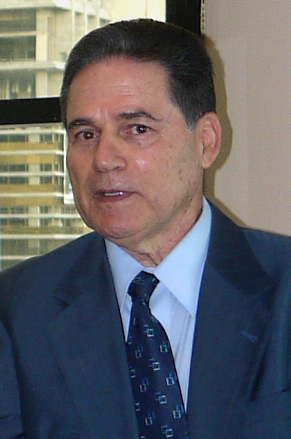
| Nominee | Arístides Royo |
| Party | Independent |
| Running mate | Ricardo de la Espriella |
| Popular vote | 452 |
| Percentage | 97.2% |
President before election
Demetrio B. Lakas
Independent
Elected President
Arístides Royo
Independent

Indirect presidential elections were held in Panama on 11 October 1978, electing a new President of the Republic.

In September 1978 Omar Torrijos announced that he would step down as Chief of Government when his six-year term expired in October but would remain Commander of the National Guard. On his recommendation, the National Assembly of Community Representatives elected Arístides Royo (a former minister of education and one of the Torrijos–Carter Treaties negotiators) president and Ricardo de la Espriella as Vice-President for a six-year term (1978–1984).

== Results ==
| Candidate | Party | Votes | % |
|---|---|---|---|
| Arístides Royo | Independent | 452 | 97.20 |
| Against | | 13 | 2.80 |
| Total | | 465 | 100.00 |
| Total votes | | 465 | – |
| Registered voters/turnout | | 505 | 92.08 |
Source: Schooley

== Aftermath ==
Commander of the National Guard Omar Torrijos was killed in an airplane crash on 31 July 1981. His death created a power vacuum and ended a 12-year "dictatorship with a heart," as Torrijos liked to call his rule. He was succeeded immediately as Guard commander by the chief of staff, Colonel Florencio Flores, a Torrijos loyalist. Although Flores adopted a low profile and allowed President Arístides Royo to exercise more of his constitutional authority, Royo soon alienated the Torrijos clique, the private sector, and the Guard's general staff, all of whom rejected his leadership style and his strongly nationalistic, anti-United States rhetoric. Royo had become the leader of leftist elements within the government, and he used his position to accuse the United States of hundreds of technical violations in the implementation of the canal treaties. The general staff considered the Guard to be the country's principal guarantor of national stability and began to challenge the president's political authority. Royo attempted to use the Democratic Revolutionary Party (PRD) as his power base, but the fighting between leftists and conservatives within the party became too intense to control. Meanwhile, the country's many and diverse political parties, although discontented with the regime, were unable to form a viable and solid opposition.

After Torrijos' death, National Guard leaders forged a pact outlining an "agreement wherein they would take turns as presidents and commanders of the National Guard".

Flores completed 26 years of military service in March 1982 and was forced to retire. He was replaced by his own chief of staff, General Rubén Darío Paredes, who considered himself to be Torrijos's rightful successor and the embodiment of change and unity. Without delay the new Guard commander asserted himself in Panamanian politics and formulated plans to run for the presidency in 1984. Many suspected that Paredes had struck a deal with Colonel Manuel Noriega, who had been the assistant chief of staff for intelligence since 1970, whereby Noriega would assume command of the Guard and Paredes would become president in 1984. Paredes publicly blamed Royo for the rapidly deteriorating economy and the pocketing of millions of dollars from the nation's social security system by government officials. In July 1982, growing labor unrest led to an outbreak of strikes and public demonstrations against the Royo administration. Paredes, claiming that "the people wanted change," intervened to remove Royo from the presidency.

With National Guard backing, Paredes forced Royo and most of his cabinet to resign on 30 July 1982. Royo was succeeded by Vice-President Ricardo de la Espriella, a United States-educated former banking official. De la Espriella wasted no time in referring to the National Guard as a "partner in power".

In August 1982, de la Espriella formed a new cabinet that included independents and members of the National Liberal Party and the PRD; Jorge Illueca, Royo's foreign minister, became the new Vice-President. Meanwhile, Colonel Armando Contreras became chief of staff of the National Guard. Colonel Noriega continued to hold the powerful position of assistant chief of staff for intelligence--the Panamanian government's only intelligence arm.

In December 1982, Noriega became chief of staff of the National Guard.

General Paredes, in keeping with the new constitutional provision that no active Guard member could participate in an election, reluctantly retired from the Guard in August 1983. He was succeeded immediately by Noriega, who was promoted to brigadier general.

The resignation of President de la Espriella and his cabinet on 13 February 1984 was barely noticed during the intense election campaign. De la Espriella was forced out by Noriega. De la Espriella had opposed the military's manipulation of the election and strongly advocated free elections for 1984. During his brief tenure, de la Espriella had failed to institute any significant policy changes, and his presidency was lackluster. De la Espriella was succeeded immediately by Vice-President Jorge Illueca, who formed a new cabinet.
