= History of Panama (1964–1977) =

Panama is a transcontinental country spanning the southern part of North America and the northern part of South America.

== The 1964 riots ==
Public demonstrations and riots arising from popular resentment over United States policies and the overwhelming presence of United States citizens and institutions had not been uncommon, but the rioting that occurred in January 1964 was uncommonly serious. The incident began with a symbolic dispute over the flying of the Panamanian flag in the Canal Zone.

For some time the dispute had been seriously complicated by differences of opinion on that issue between the Department of Defense and the Department of State. On the one hand, the military opposed accepting a Panamanian flag, emphasizing the strategic importance of unimpaired United States control in the Canal Zone and the dangerous precedent that appeasement of the rioters' demands would set for future United States-Panamanian relations. The Department of State, on the other hand, supported the flag proposal as a reasonable concession to Panamanian demands and a method of avoiding major international embarrassment. Diplomatic officials also feared that the stability of Panamanian political institutions themselves might be threatened by extensive violence and mob action over the flag issue.

The United States finally agreed to raise the Panamanian and United States flags side by side at one location. The special ceremony on September 21, 1960 at the Shaler Triangle was attended by the new governor of the zone, Major General William A. Carter, along with all high United States military and diplomatic officers and the entire Panamanian cabinet. Even this incident, however, which marked official recognition of Panama's "titular" sovereignty, was marred when the United States rejected former president Ernesto de la Guardia's request to allow him to raise the flag personally. De la Guardia, as a retaliatory measure, refused to attend the ceremony and extended invitations to the presidential reception after the ceremony only to the United States ambassador and his senior diplomatic aides; United States Canal Zone and military officials were excluded.

Panamanians remained dissatisfied as their flag appeared at only one location in the Canal Zone, while the United States flag flew alone at numerous other sites. An agreement was finally reached that at several points in the Canal Zone the United States and Panamanian flags would be flown side by side. United States citizens residing in the Canal Zone were reluctant to abide by this agreement, however, and the students of an American high school, with adult encouragement, on two consecutive days hoisted the American flag alone in front of their school.

Word of the gesture soon spread across the border, and on the evening of the second day, January 9, 1964, nearly 200 Panamanian students marched into the Canal Zone with their flag. A struggle ensued, and the Panamanian flag was torn. After that provocation, thousands of Panamanians stormed the border fence. The rioting lasted 3 days, and resulted in 21 deaths, serious injuries to several hundred persons, and more than US$2 million of property damage.

At the outbreak of the fighting, Panama charged the United States with aggression. Panama severed relations with the United States and appealed to the Organization of American States (OAS) and the United Nations (UN). On January 10 the OAS referred the case to the Inter-American Peace Committee. When the UN Security Council met, United States ambassador Adlai Stevenson noted that the Inter-American Peace Committee had already scheduled an on-the-spot investigation and urged that the problem be considered in the regional forum. A proposal by the Brazilian delegate that the president of the Security Council address an appeal to the two parties to exercise restraint was agreed on, and the UN took no further action.

The United States had hoped to confine the controversy to the Inter-American Peace Committee. But when negotiations broke down, Panama insisted that the Organ of Consultation under the 1947 Inter-American Treaty of Reciprocal Assistance (the so-called Rio Treaty) be convoked. The OAS Council, acting provisionally as the Organ of Consultation, appointed an investigating committee consisting of all the members of the Council except the two disputants. A joint declaration recommended by the Committee was signed by the two countries in April, and diplomatic relations were restored. The controversy smoldered for almost a year, however, until US President Lyndon B. Johnson announced that plans for a new canal would be drawn up and that an entirely new treaty would be negotiated.

Negotiations were carried on throughout the first half of the presidency of Roberto Chiari's successor, Marcos Aurelio Robles. When the terms of three draft treaties—concerning the existing lock canal, a possible sea-level canal, and defense matters—were revealed in 1967, Panamanian public reaction was adverse. The new treaties would have abolished the resented "in perpetuity" clause in favor of an expiration date of December 13, 1999, or the date of the completion of a new sea-level canal if that were earlier. Furthermore, they would have compensated the Panamanian government on the basis of tonnage shipped through the canal, an arrangement that could have increased the annuity to more than US$20 million.

The intensity of Panamanian nationalism, however, was such that many contended that the United States should abandon involvement in Panama altogether. Proposals for the continued United States military bases in the Canal Zone, for the right of the United States to deploy troops and armaments anywhere in the republic, and for a joint board of nine governors for the zone, five of which were to be appointed by the United States, were particularly unpopular. Robles initially attempted to defend the terms of the drafts. When he failed to obtain treaty ratification and learned that his own coalition would be at a disadvantage in the upcoming elections, he declared that further negotiations would be necessary.

== The oligarchy under fire ==
In the mid-1960s, the oligarchy was still tenuously in charge of Panama's political system. Members of the middle class, consisting largely of teachers and government workers, occasionally gained political prominence. Aspiring to upper-class stations, they failed to unite with the lower classes to displace the oligarchy. Students were the most vocal element of the middle class and the group most disposed to speak for the inarticulate poor; as graduates, however, they were generally coopted by the system.

A great chasm separated the rural section from the urban population of the two major cities. Only the rural wageworkers, concentrated in the provinces of Bocas del Toro and Chiriquí, appeared to follow events in the capital and to express themselves on issues of national policy. Among the urban lower classes, antagonism between the Spanish speakers and the English- and French-speaking blacks inhibited organization in pursuit of common interests.

Literacy was high—about 77 percent—despite the scarcity of secondary schools in the rural areas. Voter turnout also tended to be high, despite the unreliability of vote counts. (A popular saying is "He who counts the votes elects.") Concentration on the sins of the United States had served as a safety valve, diverting attention from the injustices of the domestic system.

The multi-party system that existed until the coup d'état of 1968 served to regulate competition for political power among the leading families. Individual parties characteristically served as the personal machines of leaders, whose clients (supporters or dependents) anticipated jobs or other advantages if their candidate were successful. Of the major parties competing in the 1960s, only the highly factionalized National Liberal Party (Partido Liberal Nacional, PLN) had a history of more than two decades. The only parties that had developed clearly identifiable programs were the small Socialist Party and the Christian Democratic Party (Partido Demócrato Cristiano, PDC). The only party with a mass base was the Panameñista Party (Partido Panameñista, PP), the electoral vehicle of the erratic former president, Arnulfo Arias. The Panameñista Party appealed to the frustrated, but lacked a clearly recognizable ideology or program.

Seven candidates competed in the 1964 presidential elections, although only three were serious contenders. Robles, who had served as minister of the presidency in Chiari's cabinet, was the candidate of the National Opposition Union, comprising the PLN and seven smaller parties. After lengthy backstage maneuvers, Robles was endorsed by the outgoing president. Juan de Arco Galindo, a former member of the National Assembly and public works minister and brother-in-law of former President de la Guardia, was the candidate of the National Opposition Alliance (Alianza Nacional de Oposición) coalition, comprising seven parties headed by the CPN. Arnulfo Arias was supported by the PP, already the largest single party in the country.

As usual, the status of the canal was a principal issue in the campaign. Both the liberal and the CPN coalitions cultivated nationalist sentiment by denouncing the United States. Arias, abandoning his earlier nationalistic theme, assumed a cooperative and conciliatory stance toward the United States. Arias attracted lower-class support by denouncing the oligarchy. The Electoral Tribunal announced that Robles had defeated Arias by a margin of more than 10,000 votes of the 317,312 votes cast. The CPN coalition trailed far behind the top two contenders. Arias supporters, who had won a majority of the National Assembly seats, attributed Robles's victory to the "miracle of Los Santos"; they claimed that enough corpses voted for Robles in that province to enable him to carry the election.

The problems confronting Robles were not unlike those of his predecessors but were aggravated by the consequences of the 1964 riots. In addition to the hardships and resentments resulting from the losses of life and property, the riots had the effect of dramatically increasing the already serious unemployment in the metropolitan areas. Despite his nationalistic rhetoric during the campaign, the new president was dependent on United States economic and technical assistance to develop projects that Chiari's government, also with United States assistance, had initiated. Chiari emphasized building schools and low-cost housing. He endorsed a limited agrarian-reform program. Like his predecessor, Robles sought to increase the efficiency of tax collection rather than raise taxes.

By 1967 the coalitions were being reshuffled in preparation for the 1968 elections. By the time Arias announced his candidacy, he had split both the coalitions that had participated in the 1964 elections and had secured the support of several factions in a coalition headed by the Panameñista Party. Robles's endorsement went to David Samudio of the PLN. A civil engineer and architect of middle-class background, Samudio had served as an assemblyman and had held several cabinet posts, including that of finance minister under Robles. In addition to the PLN, he was supported by the Labor and Agrarian Party (Partido Laborista Agrario, PALA) and other splinter groups. (Party labels are deceptive; the PALA, for example, had neither an agrarian base nor organized labor support.) A PDC candidate, Antonio González Revilla, also entered the race.

Because many of Arias's supporters believed that the 1964 election had been rigged, the principal issue in the 1968 campaign became the prospective validity of the election itself. The credibility crisis became acute in February 1968 when the president of the Electoral Tribunal, a Samudio supporter, closed the central registration office in a dispute with the other two members of the tribunal, Arias supporters, over electoral procedures. The government brought a suit before the Supreme Court for their dismissal, on the grounds that each man had a son who was a candidate for elective office. Thereupon González Revilla, with the backing of Arias, petitioned the National Assembly to begin impeachment proceedings against Robles for illegal interferences in electoral matters. Among other issues, Robles was accused of diverting public funds to Samudio's campaign.

The National Assembly met in special session and appointed a commission to gather evidence. Robles, in turn, obtained a judgment from a municipal court that the assembly was acting unconstitutionally. The National Assembly chose to ignore a stay order issued by the municipal court pending the reconvening of the Supreme Court on April 1, and on March 14 it voted for impeachment. On March 24, the National Assembly found Robles guilty and declared him deposed. Robles and the National Guard ignored the proceedings, maintaining that they would abide by the decision of the Supreme Court when it reconvened.

The Supreme Court, with only one dissenting vote, ruled the impeachment proceedings unconstitutional. The Electoral Tribunal subsequently ruled that thirty of the parliamentary deputies involved in the impeachment proceedings were ineligible for reelection. Robles, with the support of the National Guard, retained the presidency.

The election took place on May 12, 1968, as scheduled, and tension mounted over the succeeding eighteen days as the Election Board and the Electoral Tribunal delayed announcing the results. Finally the Election Board declared that Arias had carried the election by 175,432 votes to 133,887 for Samudio and 11,371 for González Revilla. The Electoral Tribunal, senior to the Board and still loyal to Robles, protested, but the commander of the National Guard, Brigadier General Bolívar Vallarino, despite past animosity toward Arias, supported the conclusion of the Board.

Arias took office on October 1, demanding the immediate return of the Canal Zone to Panamanian jurisdiction and announcing a change in the leadership of the National Guard. He attempted to remove the two most senior officers, Vallarino and Colonel José María Pinilla, and appoint Colonel Bolívar Urrutia to command the force. On October 11 the Guard, for the third time, removed Arias from the presidency. With seven of his eight ministers and twenty-four members of the National Assembly, Arias took refuge in the Canal Zone.

== The government of Torrijos and the National Guard ==
The overthrow of Arias provoked student demonstrations and rioting in some of the slum areas of Panama City. The peasants in Chiriquí Province battled guardsmen sporadically for several months, but the Guard retained control. Urrutia was initially arrested but was later persuaded to join in the two-man provisional junta headed by Pinilla. Vallarino remained in retirement. The original cabinet appointed by the junta was rather broad-based and included several Samudio supporters and one Arias supporter. After the first three months, however, five civilian cabinet members resigned, accusing the new government of dictatorial practices.

The provisional junta moved swiftly to consolidate government control. Several hundred actual or potential political leaders were arrested on charges of corruption or subversion. Others went into voluntary or imposed exile, and property owners were threatened with expropriation. The National Assembly and all political parties were disbanded, and the University of Panama was closed for several months while its faculty and student body were purged. The communications media were brought under control through censorship, intervention in management, or expropriation.

Pinilla, who assumed the title of president, had declared that his government was provisional and that free elections were to be scheduled. In January 1969, however, power actually rested in the hands of Omar Torrijos and Boris Martínez, commander and chief of staff, respectively, of the Guard. In early March, a speech by Martinez promising agrarian reform and other measures radical enough to alarm landowners and entrepreneurs provoked a coup within the coup. Torrijos assumed full control, and Martinez and three of his supporters in the military government were exiled.

Torrijos stated that "there would be less impulsiveness" in government without Martinez. Torrijos did not denounce the proposed reforms, but he assured Panamanian and United States investors that their interests were not threatened.

Torrijos, now a brigadier general, became even more firmly entrenched in power after thwarting a coup attempted by Colonels Amado Sanjur, Luis Q. Nentzen Franco, and Ramiro Silvera in December 1969. While Torrijos was in Mexico, the three colonels declared him deposed. Torrijos rushed back to Panama, gathered supporters at the garrison in David, and marched triumphantly into the capital. The colonels followed earlier competitors of Torrijos into exile. Because the governing junta (Colonel Pinilla and his deputy, Colonel Urrutia) had not opposed the abortive coup, Torrijos replaced them with two civilians, Demetrio B. Lakas, an engineer well liked among businessmen, and Arturo Sucre, a lawyer and former director of the national lottery. Lakas was designated "provisional president", and Sucre was appointed his deputy.

In late 1969, a close associate of Torrijos announced the formation of the New Panama Movement. This movement was originally intended to organize peasants, workers, and other social groups and was patterned after that of Mexico's Institutional Revolutionary Party. No organizational structure was established, however, and by 1971 the idea had been abandoned. The government party was revived under a different name, the Democratic Revolutionary Party (Partido Revolucionario Democrático, PRD) in the late 1970s.

A sweeping cabinet reorganization and comments of high-ranking officials in 1971 portended a shift in domestic policy. Torrijos expressed admiration for the socialist trends in the military governments of Peru and Bolivia. He also established a mutually supportive relationship with Cuba's Fidel Castro. Torrijos carefully distanced himself from the Panamanian Marxist left. The political label he appeared to wear most comfortably was "populist". In 1970 he declared, "Having finished with the oligarchy, the Panamanian has his own worth with no importance to his origin, his cradle, or where he was born."

Torrijos worked on building a popular base for his government, forming an alliance among the National Guard and the various sectors of society that had been the objects of social injustice at the hands of the oligarchy, particularly the long-neglected campesinos. He regularly traveled by helicopter to villages throughout the interior to hear their problems and to explain his new programs.

In addition to the National Guard and the campesinos, the populist alliance that Torrijos formed as a power base included students, the People's Party (Partido del Pueblo, PdP), and portions of the working classes. Support for Torrijos varied among interest groups and over time. The alliance contained groups, most notably the Guard and students, that were traditionally antagonistic toward one another and groups that traditionally had little concern with national politics, e.g., the rural sector. Nationalism, in the form of support of the efforts of the Torrijos regime to obtain control over the canal through a new treaty with the United States, provided the glue for maintaining political consensus.

In the early 1970s, the strength of the alliance was impressive. Disloyal or potentially disloyal elements within the National Guard and student groups were purged; increased salaries, perquisites, and positions of political power were offered to the loyal majority. The adherence of the middle classes was procured partly through more jobs. In return for its support, the PdP was allowed to operate openly when all other political parties were outlawed.

The Torrijos effort to secure political support in the rural sector was an innovation in Panamanian politics. With the exception of militant banana workers in the western provinces of Chiriquí and Bocas del Toro, the campesinos traditionally have had little concern with national political issues. Unlike much of Latin America, in Panama the elite is almost totally urban based, rather than being a landed aristocracy.

No elections were held under the military government until April 1970, when the town of San Miguelito, incorporated as the country's sixty-fourth municipal district, was allowed to elect a mayor, treasurer, and municipal council. Candidates nominated by trade groups and other nonpartisan bodies were elected indirectly by a council that had been elected by neighborhood councils. Subsequently, the new system was extended throughout the country, and in 1972 the 505-member National Assembly of Municipal Representatives met in Panama City to confirm Torrijos's role as head of government and to approve a new constitution. The new document greatly expanded governmental powers at the expense of civil liberties. The state also was empowered to "oversee the rational distribution of land" and, in general, to regulate or initiate economic activities. In a reference to the Canal Zone, the Constitution also declared the ceding of national territory to any foreign country to be illegal.

The governmental initiatives in the economy, legitimated by the new Constitution, were already underway. The government had announced in early 1969 its intention to implement 1962 legislation by distributing 700,000 hectares of land within 3 years to 61,300 families. Acquisition and distribution progressed much more slowly than anticipated, however.

Nevertheless, major programs were undertaken. Primary attention and government assistance went to farmers grouped in organizations that were initially described as cooperatives but were in fact commercial farming operations by state-owned firms. The government also established companies to operate banana plantations—partly because a substantial amount of the land obtained under the land-reform laws was most suited to banana cultivation and had belonged to international fruit companies.

Educational reforms instituted by Torrijos emphasized vocational and technica training at the expense of law, liberal arts, and the humanities. The programs introduced on an experimental basis in some elementary and secondary schools resembled the Cuban system of "basic schools in the countryside". New schools were established in rural areas in which half the student's time was devoted to instruction in farming. Agricultural methods and other practical skills were taught to urban students as well, and ultimately the new curriculum was to become obligatory even in private schools. Although the changes were being instituted gradually, they met strong resistance from the upper-middle classes and particularly from teachers.

Far-reaching reforms were also undertaken in health care. A program of integrated medical care became available to the extended family of anyone who had been employed for the minimal period required to qualify for social security. A wide range of services was available not only to the worker's spouse and children, but to parents, aunts, uncles, cousins—to any dependent relative. Whereas in the past medical facilities had been limited almost entirely to Panama City, under Torrijos hospitals were built in several provincial cities. Clinics were established throughout the countryside. Medical-school graduates were required to spend at least two years in a rural internship servicing the scattered clinics.

Torrijos also undertook an ambitious program of public works. The construction of new roads and bridges contributed particularly to greater prosperity in the rural areas. Although Torrijos showed greater interest in rural development than in urban problems, he also promoted urban housing and office construction in Panama City. These projects were funded, in part, by both increased personal and corporate taxes and increased efficiency in tax collection. The 1972 enactment of a new labor code attempted to fuse the urban working class into the populist alliance. Among other things the code provided obligatory collective agreements, obligatory payroll deduction of union fees, the establishment of a superior labor tribunal, and the incorporation of some 15,000 additional workers, including street vendors and peddlers, into labor unions. At the same time, the government attempted unsuccessfully to unite the nation's three major labor confederations into a single, government-sponsored organization.

Meanwhile, Torrijos lured foreign investment by offering tax incentives and provisions for an unlimited repatriation of capital. In particular, international banking was encouraged to locate to Panama, to make the country a regional financial center. A law adopted in 1970 facilitated offshore banking. Numerous banks, largely foreign owned, were licensed to operate in Panama; some were authorized solely for external transactions. Funds borrowed abroad could be loaned to foreign borrowers without being taxed by Panama.

Most of the reforms benefiting workers and peasants were undertaken between 1971 and 1973. Economic problems beginning in 1973 led to some backtracking on social programs. A new labor law passed in 1976, for example, withdrew much of the protection provided by the 1972 labor code, including compulsory collective bargaining. The causes of these economic difficulties included such external factors as the decline in world trade, and thus canal traffic. Domestic problems included a decline in agricultural production that many analysts attributed to the failure of the economic measures of the Torrijos government. The combination of a steady decline in per capita gross national product, inflation, unemployment, and massive foreign debts adversely affected all sectors of society and contributed heavily to the gradual erosion of the populist alliance that had firmly supported Torrijos in the early 1970s.

Increasingly, corruption in governing circles and within the National Guard also had become an issue in both national and international arenas. Torrijos's opponents were quick to note that his relatives appeared in large numbers on the public payroll.

== The treaty negotiations ==
During the first two years after the overthrow of Arias, while the Guard consolidated its control of the government and Torrijos rooted out his competitors within the Guard, the canal issue was downplayed and generally held in abeyance. By 1971, however, the negotiation of new treaties had reemerged as the primary goal of the Torrijos regime.

In the 1970s, about 5 percent of world trade, by volume, some 20 to 30 ships daily, were passing through the canal. Tolls had been kept artificially low, averaging a little more than US$10,000 for the 8- to 10-hour passage, and thus entailing a United States government subsidy. Nevertheless, canal use was declining in the 1970s, because of alternate routes, vessels being too large to transit the canal, and the decline in world trade.

The canal, nevertheless, was clearly vital to Panama's economy. Some 30 percent of Panama's foreign trade passed through the canal. About 25 percent of the country's foreign exchange earnings and 13 percent of its GNP were associated with canal activities. The level of traffic and the revenue thereby generated were key factors in the country's economic life.

Under the 1903 treaty, the governor of the Canal Zone was appointed by the president of the United States and reported to the secretary of war. The governor also served as president of the Canal Zone Company, and reported to a board of directors appointed by the secretary of war. United States jurisdiction in the zone was complete, and residence was restricted to United States government employees and their families. On the eve of the adoption of new treaties in 1977, residents of the Canal Zone included some 40,000 United States citizens, two-thirds of whom were military personnel and their dependents, and about 7,500 Panamanians. The Canal Zone was, in effect, a United States military outpost with its attendant prosperous economy, which stood in stark contrast to the poverty on the other side of its fences.

By the 1960s, military activities in the zone were under the direction of the United States Southern Command (SOUTHCOM). The primary mission of SOUTHCOM was defending the canal. In addition, SOUTHCOM served as the nerve center for a wide range of military activities in Latin America, including communications, training Latin American military personnel, overseeing United States military assistance advisory groups, and conducting joint military exercises with Latin American armed forces.

Negotiations for a new set of treaties were resumed in June 1971, but little was accomplished until March 1973 when, at the urging of Panama, the UN Security Council called a special meeting in Panama City. A resolution calling on the United States to negotiate a "just and equitable" treaty was vetoed by the United States on the grounds that the disposition of the canal was a bilateral matter. Panama had succeeded, however, in dramatizing the issue and gaining international support.

The United States signaled renewed interest in the negotiations in late 1973, when Ambassador Ellsworth Bunker was dispatched to Panama as a special envoy. In early 1974, Secretary of State Henry Kissinger and Panamanian foreign minister Juan Antonio Tack announced their agreement on eight principles to serve as a guide in negotiating a "just and equitable treaty eliminating once and for all the causes of conflict between the two countries." The principles included recognition of Panamanian sovereignty in the Canal Zone; immediate enhancement of economic benefits to Panama; a fixed expiration date for United States control of the canal; increased Panamanian participation in the operation and defense of the canal; and continuation of United States participation in defending the canal.

American attention was distracted later in 1974 by the Watergate scandal, impeachment proceedings, and ultimately the resignation of President Richard M. Nixon. Negotiations with Panama were accelerated by President Gerald R. Ford in mid-1975 but became deadlocked on four central issues: the duration of the treaty; the amount of canal revenues to go to Panama; the amount of territory United States military bases would occupy during the life of the treaty; and the United States demand for a renewable forty- or fifty-year lease of bases to defend the canal. Panama was particularly concerned with the open-ended presence of United States military bases and held that the emerging United States position retained the bitterly opposed "perpetuity" provision of the 1903 treaty and thus violated the spirit of the 1974 Kissinger-Tack principles. The sensitivity of the issue during negotiations was illustrated in September 1975 when Kissinger's public declaration that "the United States must maintain the right, unilaterally, to defend the Panama Canal for an indefinite future" provoked a furor in Panama. A group of some 600 angry students stoned the United States embassy.

Negotiations remained stalled during the United States election campaign of 1976 when the canal issue, particularly the question of how the United States could continue to guarantee its security under new treaty arrangements, became a major topic of debate. Torrijos replaced Foreign Minister Tack with Aquilino Boyd in April 1976, and early the next year Boyd was replaced by Nicolás González Revilla. Rómulo Escobar Bethancourt, meanwhile, became Panama's chief negotiator. Panama's growing economic difficulties made the conclusion of a new treaty, accompanied by increased economic benefits, increasingly vital.

The new Panamanian negotiating team was thus encouraged by the high priority that President Jimmy Carter placed on rapidly concluding a new treaty. Carter added Sol Linowitz, former ambassador to the OAS, to the United States negotiating team shortly after taking office in January 1977. Carter held that United States interests would be protected by possessing "an assured capacity or capability" to guarantee that the canal would remain open and neutral after Panama assumed control. This view contrasted with previous United States demands for an ongoing physical military presence and led to the negotiation of two separate treaties. This changed point of view, together with United States willingness to provide a considerable amount of bilateral development aid in addition to the revenues associated with Panama's participation in the operation of the canal, were central to the August 10, 1977 announcement that agreement had been reached on two new treaties.
