= 1968 Panamanian general election =

General elections were held in Panama on May 12, 1968, electing both a new President of the Republic and a new National Assembly.

The election took place on May 12, 1968, as scheduled, and tension mounted over the succeeding eighteen days as the Election Board and the Electoral Tribunal delayed announcing the results. Finally, the Election Board declared that Arnulfo Arias had carried the election by 175,432 votes to 133,887 for David Samudio Ávila and 11,371 for Antonio González Revilla. The Electoral Tribunal, senior to the Board and still loyal to President Marco Aurelio Robles, protested, but the commander of the National Guard, Brigadier General Bolívar Vallarino, supported the conclusion of the Board despite past animosity toward Arias.

Arnulfo Arias was declared the winner on May 30.

== Results ==
=== President ===
Candidate	Party or alliance		Votes	%
Arnulfo Arias	National Union	Panameñista Party	99,076	30.89
Arnulfo Arias	National Union	Republican Party	35,739	11.14
Arnulfo Arias	National Union	National Patriotic Coalition	19,072	5.95
Arnulfo Arias	National Union	Democratic Action Party	11,070	3.45
Arnulfo Arias	National Union	Third Nationalist Party	10,475	3.27
Arnulfo Arias	National Union	Total	175,432	54.70
David Samudio Ávila	People's Alliance	National Liberal Party	66,515	20.74
David Samudio Ávila	People's Alliance	Labor and Agrarian Party	31,151	9.71
David Samudio Ávila	People's Alliance	National Liberation Movement	20,987	6.54
David Samudio Ávila	People's Alliance	National Progressive Party	15,234	4.75
David Samudio Ávila	People's Alliance	Total	133,887	41.75
Antonio González Revilla	Christian Democratic Party		11,371	3.55
Total			320,690	100.00
Valid votes			320,690	98.06
Invalid/blank votes			6,358	1.94
Total votes			327,048	100.00
Registered voters/turnout			544,135	60.10
Source: Nohlen

=== National Assembly ===
Party or alliance		Seats
National Union	Panameñista Party	34
National Union	Republican Party	34
National Union	National Patriotic Coalition	34
National Union	Democratic Action Party	34
National Union	Third Nationalist Party	34
People's Alliance	National Liberal Party	7
People's Alliance	Labor and Agrarian Party	7
People's Alliance	National Liberation Movement	7
People's Alliance	National Progressive Party	7
Christian Democratic Party		1
Total		42
Source: Political Handbook of the World

== Aftermath ==
Arias took office on 1 October, demanding the immediate return of the Canal Zone to Panamanian jurisdiction and announcing a change in the leadership of the National Guard. He attempted to remove the two most senior officers, Bolívar Vallarino and Colonel José María Pinilla, and appoint Colonel Bolívar Urrutia to command the force.

On 11 October the Guard, for the third time, removed Arnulfo Arias from the presidency in a coup d'état. With seven of his 8 ministers and 24 members of the National Assembly, Arias took refuge in the Canal Zone.

The overthrow of Arnulfo Arias provoked student demonstrations and rioting in some of the slum areas of Panama City. The peasants in Chiriquí Province battled guardsmen sporadically for several months, but the Guard retained control. Bolívar Urrutia was initially arrested but was later persuaded to join in the two-man provisional junta headed by José María Pinilla. Bolívar Vallarino remained in retirement. The original cabinet appointed by the junta was rather broad based and included several David Samudio Ávila supporters and one Arias supporter. After the first three months, however, 5 civilian cabinet members resigned, accusing the new government of dictatorial practices.

The provisional junta moved swiftly to consolidate government control. Several hundred actual or potential political leaders were arrested on charges of corruption or subversion. Others went into voluntary or imposed exile, and property owners were threatened with expropriation. The National Assembly and all political parties were disbanded. José María Pinilla, who assumed the title of president, had declared that his government was provisional and that free elections were to be scheduled. In January 1969, however, power actually rested in the hands of Omar Torrijos and Boris Martínez, commander and chief of staff, respectively, of the Guard. In early March, a speech by Martinez promising agrarian reform and other measures radical enough to alarm landowners and entrepreneurs provoked a coup within the coup. Torrijos assumed full control, and Martinez and 3 of his supporters in the military government were exiled. Torrijos stated that "there would be less impulsiveness" in government without Martinez. Torrijos did not denounce the proposed reforms, but he assured Panamanian and United States investors that their interests were not threatened.

The period (1968-1972) coincided with the years during which Torrijos governed through cabinet decrees. Although there was a civilian president, he had no real power; the National Assembly and political parties were abolished.

Torrijos, now a brigadier general, became even more firmly entrenched in power after thwarting a coup attempted by Colonels Amado Sanjur, Luis Q. Nentzen Franco, and Ramiro Silvera in December 1969. While Torrijos was in Mexico, the 3 colonels declared him deposed. Torrijos rushed back to Panama, gathered supporters at the garrison in David, and marched triumphantly into the capital. The colonels followed earlier competitors of Torrijos into exile. Because the governing junta (Colonel José María Pinilla and his deputy, Colonel Urrutia) had not opposed the abortive coup, Torrijos replaced them with two civilians, Demetrio B. Lakas, an engineer well liked among businessmen, and Arturo Sucre Pereira, a lawyer and former director of the national lottery. Lakas was designated "provisional president," and Sucre was appointed his deputy.
