= 1968 Panamanian coup d'état =

1968 military coup in Panama

| Date | 11 October 1968 |
| Location | Panama |
| Result | Military coup d'état successful: Installation of the Provisional Government Board, led by Colonels José María Pinilla Fábrega and Bolívar Urrutia Parrilla |

Belligerents
| Government of Panama | National Guard of Panama |

Commanders and leaders
| Arnulfo Arias Madrid | Boris Martínez; Jose Humberto Ramos; Rubén Darío Paredes |

The 1968 Panamanian coup d'état was the military coup that took place in the Republic of Panama on October 11, 1968, when the National Guard, led by Major Boris Martínez, Lieutenant Colonel Jose Humberto Ramos, Rubén Darío Paredes and other military officers overthrew President Arnulfo Arias, who was elected in the May 12 general election and assumed office on October 1.

== Coup ==
On Friday, October 11, 1968, the National Guard deposed President Arnulfo Arias, who was in a movie theater in Panama City. Upon learning of the events, he took refuge in the Panama Canal Zone under the control of the United States Army. Major Boris Martínez (from Chiriquí Province) and Lieutenant Colonel Jose Humberto Ramos (from Santiago, Veraguas Province) commanded the coup. The "Provisional Junta of Government", led by colonels José María Pinilla Fábrega and Bolívar Urrutia Parrilla, would be imposed.

On October 12, the newspaper El Mundo (the only one which circulated that day) indicated that a military junta took power, without mentioning the names of its members, and that National Guard troops with machine guns surrounded the residence of Arnulfo Arias, who managed to take refuge in the Panama Canal Zone. The newspaper also reported that sporadic shots were heard "in the slum areas of Panama City," while the director of Hospital Santo Tomás stated that a man and a woman were shot and wounded. The newspaper warned that all civil rights had been suspended.

During 1968, guerrilla activity was registered in the urban area and in the interior of the country by the Federación de Estudiantes de Panamá and other organizations, as well as supporters of deposed President Arias. There were military acts against the National Guard, the closing of newspapers and the development of the issue of pamphlets and clandestine writings.

== Rise of Torrijos and aftermath ==
Having received news of the coup while in the Panama Canal Zone, Lieutenant Colonel Omar Torrijos and a few officers, including businessman Demetrio B. Lakas, sought to re-establish some form of civilian rule, even attempting to install President Arias' vice-president, Raul Arango as the new president, much to Martínez's dismay. Although the "Provisional Junta of Government" was appointed, Martinez and Torrijos were the true leaders from the beginning. Soon after the coup, Torrijos was promoted to full colonel and named commandant of the National Guard. They barred all political activity and shut down the legislature. They also seized control of three newspapers owned by President Arias' brother, Harmodio and blackmailed the owners of the country's oldest newspaper, La Estrella de Panamá, into becoming a government mouthpiece.

With enough opposition against Martinez including from the United States, Torrijos ousted and exiled Martínez and Jose Humberto Ramos to Miami on February 23, 1969, nearly four months after the initial coup.

Torrijos went on to rule Panama as the de facto military dictator until his death in a plane crash on July 23, 1981.

== See also ==
- History of Panama

== Bibliography ==
- (in Spanish) Jasón Pérez, Brittmarie, En Nuestra Propias voces; Panamá Protesta 1968–1989, Primera Edición, Editado por la Corporación La Prensa, Impreso LITHO, Editorial Chen S.A
