= 1972 Panamanian presidential election =

← 1968	October 10, 1972	1978 →
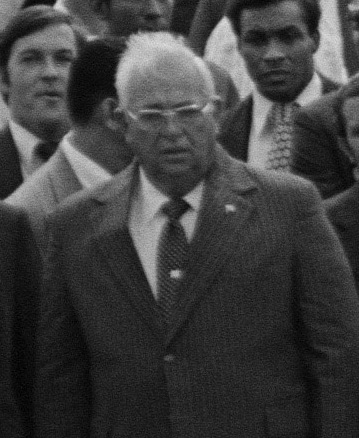
Nominee	Demetrio B. Lakas
Party	Independent
Running mate	Arturo Sucre
Popular vote	400
Percentage	99.75%
President before election
Demetrio B. Lakas
Independent
Elected President
Demetrio B. Lakas
Independent

Indirect presidential elections were held in Panama on October 10, 1972, electing both a new President and Vice President of the Republic. The National Assembly of Community Representatives elected Demetrio B. Lakas president and Arturo Sucre Pereira as vice-president for a six-year term (1972–1978).

== Results ==
Candidate	Party	Votes	%
Demetrio B. Lakas	Independent	400	99.75
Against		1	0.25
Total		401	100.00
Total votes		401	–
Registered voters/turnout		505	79.41
Source: La Vanguardia Española
