= Permanent Representative of Panama to the United Nations =

This is a list of permanent representatives of Panama to the United Nations.

- Germán G. Guardia J. (1945–1947)
- Manuel De Jesús Quijano Sarria (1947 - 1948)
- Mario de Diego (1948–1950)
- Eusebio A. Morales (1952–1954)
- Roberto de la Guardia (1955–1957)
- Alejandro Remón Cantera (1957–1959)
- Jorge E. Illueca (1959–1960)
- Enrique A. Jimenez (1961–1962)
- Aquilino Boyd (1962–1976)
- Jorge E. Illueca (1976–1981)
- Carlos Osores Typaldos (1981–1983)
- Aquilino E. Boyd (1985)
- David Samudio (1985–1987)
- Jorge Ritter (1987–1988)
- Leonardo Kam (1988–1989)
- Oscar E. Ceville (1989–1989)
- Eduardo Vallarino (1990–1990)
- Cesar Pereira Burgos (1990–1992)
- Jorge E. Illueca (1994–1997)
- Carlos Arosemena A. (1997–1999)
- Ramón Morales (diplomat) (1999–2004)
- Ricardo Alberto Arias (2004–2009)
- Yavel Francis Lanuza (2009–2009)
- Pablo Antonio Thalassinos (2009–2014)
- Laura E. Flores (2014–2017)
- Melitón Alejandro Arrocha Ruíz (2018–2019)
- Markova Concepción Jaramillo (2020–present)
