= 1972 presidential election =

1972 presidential election may refer to:

- 1972 Cambodian presidential election
- 1972 Salvadoran presidential election
- 1972 Icelandic presidential election
- 1972 Malagasy presidential election
- 1972 Panamanian presidential election
- 1972 Portuguese presidential election
- 1972 South Korean presidential election
- 1972 United States presidential election
