= Congressional Pro-Trade Caucus =

The Congressional Pro-Trade Caucus (CPTC) was founded by Democratic Congressman Henry Cuellar in 2009 during the 111th Congress. Cuellar, a member of the coalition of Blue Dog Democrats, characterized the group as Democrats and Republicans from all across the country, united by the belief that trade is the lifeblood of the global economy and that healthy trade is a prerequisite of economic recovery. One of its primary issues of interest was the NAFTA-Mexican trucking dispute.

== See also ==
- House trade working group
- United States – Colombia Free Trade Agreement
- Panama – United States Trade Promotion Agreement
- South Korea – United States Free Trade Agreement
- Trans-Pacific Strategic Economic Partnership
- United States Trade Representative
- Caucuses of the United States Congress
- Congressional caucus
- North American Free Trade Agreement
