= Getting to Know the General: The Story of an Involvement =

1984 travel book and memoir by Graham Greene

Getting to Know the General
- First edition (UK)
- Author: Graham Greene
- Language: English
- Subject: Panama, Omar Torrijos
- Publisher: Simon & Schuster
- Publication date: October 30, 1984
- Publication place: United Kingdom
- Media type: Print (Hardcover)
- Pages: 232
- Preceded by: Monsignor Quixote
- Followed by: The Tenth Man

Getting to Know the General: The Story of an Involvement is a travel book and memoir by Graham Greene, published in 1984.

== Summary ==
Greene was summoned in 1976 to meet Omar Torrijos, who served as Commander of the Panamanian National Guard and was de facto head of Panama from 1968 to his death in 1981, as Torrijos felt that Greene would be friendly towards his aim of setting up a social democratic state which was independent of both the United States and the Soviet Union. Greene already had a keen interest in Latin America, as shown in The Power and the Glory and The Honorary Consul. He befriended Torrijos and his bodyguard, José de Jesús Martínez. Travelling through Panama, he visited towns and villages and met Daniel Ortega, who became president of Nicaragua in 1985, and Cayetano Carpio, the revolutionary who killed himself in 1983 during the writing of the book.

Greene went with Gabriel García Márquez to the signing of the Torrijos-Carter Treaties in 1977 as part of his yearly visit to Panama. He wrote of his impressions of Augusto Pinochet and other South American leaders and of his own experiences in Panama.

Greene discusses the death of Torrijos in a plane crash in 1981, which has never been fully explained, and may have been caused by a pilot error or an assassination. Although he had planned to write a novel called On the Way Back, he decided to turn his learning into a nonfiction book. Some of the ideas for On the Way Back ideas were later worked into his novel The Captain and the Enemy.
