= Gerardo González Vernaza =

Panamanian politician (1929–2006)

- Born: April 13, 1929; Veraguas Province, Panama
- Died: October 21, 2006 (aged 77); Panama City, Panama
- Occupation: Politician
- Known for: Vice President of Panama, President of National Assembly
- Political party: Democratic Revolutionary Party (PRD)
- Children: Pedro Miguel González Pinzón

Gerardo González Vernaza (April 13, 1929 – October 21, 2006) was a Panamanian politician from Veraguas Province. He served as Vice President of Panama and President of the National Assembly, serving in the latter post from 1997 to 1999.

== Political career ==
From 1975 to 1978, González Vernaza was the Vice President of Panama under Demetrio B. Lakas. In 1979, he helped found the Democratic Revolutionary Party of military ruler Omar Torrijos.

In December 1991, serving as the president of the PRD, he vigorously criticized the administration of president Guillermo Endara, stating that "in 24 months, Endara has lost his political and moral authority, demonstrating his incapability to lead Panama." He also opposed Endara's ultimately successful measures to abolish Panama's armed forces.

González Vernaza opposed the presence of US forces in Panama past the 1999 deadline for withdrawal set by the Torrijos-Carter Treaties for the handover of the Panama Canal. He campaigned in favor of a constitutional referendum that would have allowed President Ernesto Pérez Balladares, a fellow PRD member, to seek a second term in office, calling the measure's opponents "cockroaches and scorpions".

In 2004, González Vernaza was elected as a Panamanian representative to the Central American Parliament.

== Son's murder trial and acquittal ==
In July 1992, González Vernaza's son Pedro Miguel González Pinzón was accused of the murder of US Army Sgt. Zak Hernandez, who had been shot to death in his Humvee, and a warrant was issued for González Pinzón's arrest. According to a lawyer for the US Embassy, three witnesses stated he was present at the scene, while others saw him and two accomplices in the stolen car used in the shooting. The car was later found on a farm owned by his father. The US Federal Bureau of Investigation matched an AK-47 from the attacks was found on the farm as well, while Scotland Yard and the Panamanian police did not find the AK-47 to match the bullets from the shootings. Though an arrest warrant was issued for González Pinzón shortly after the murder, he evaded arrest for more than two years, reportedly spending part of this time in Cuba. In 1995, he surrendered directly to new President Ernesto Perez Balladares on live national television, accompanied by his father. González Vernaza stated that the unusual circumstances were needed "to avoid an attempt on the kid's life". He accused the previous Endara administration of "judicial terrorism" and stated that under the Perez Balladares administration, his son could receive a fair trial.

González Pinzón was acquitted by a Panamanian court in 1997, though he remained wanted in the US, where he had been indicted by a grand jury. He later followed in his father's footsteps, serving two terms in the National Assembly and becoming its president despite US protest in September 2007.

== Death ==
González Vernaza died on October 21, 2006, in Panama City of a disease.

Political offices
Preceded by Arturo Sucre	Vice President of Panama; 1975–1978	Succeeded by Ricardo de la Espriella
