= Adela Ruiz de Royo =

Panamanian mathematics academic (1943–2019)

First Lady of Panama
- In office October 11, 1978 – July 31, 1982
- President: Arístides Royo
- Preceded by: Fanny Roger de Lakas
- Succeeded by: Mercedes Martinez de la Espriella

Personal details
- Born: Adela María Ruiz González; December 15, 1943 Grado, Asturias, Spain
- Died: June 19, 2019 (aged 75) Panama
- Spouse: Arístides Royo (1960s–2019; her death)
- Occupation: Mathematics teacher and academic

Adela María Ruiz González, customary married name Ruiz de Royo (December 15, 1943 – June 19, 2019) was a Spanish-born Panamanian mathematics academic and educator. She served as the First Lady of Panama from 1978 until 1982 during the presidency of her husband, Arístides Royo. She also served President of the Panamanian Academy of Language (Academia Panameña de la Lengua).

== Biography ==
Ruiz was born Adela María Ruiz González in a home in the municipality of Grado, Asturias, Spain to parents, José María and Rosalina. She was raised in the nearby city of Oviedo alongside her three sisters, Marta, Mabel, and María José. Ruiz was nicknamed Deli.

By 1960, Ruiz had moved to Salamanca to study medicine. That same year, she met her future husband, a Panamanian national and fellow student at the University of Salamanca named Arístides Royo. The couple married in the early 1960s and eventually had three children - Marta Elena, Irma Natalia, and Aristides José. Ruiz, Royo and their oldest daughter, Marta, moved to Panama permanently on September 17, 1965.

In addition to her own career, Ruiz held the role of the wife of a government minister and politician. She became First Lady of Panama from 1978 to 1982. During her tenure as first lady, Ruiz created the Asociación Pro Obras de Beneficencia.

Ruiz was diagnosed with colon and liver cancer in 2017. She died from the disease on June 19, 2019, at the age of 75. Adela Ruiz was survived by her husband, Arístides Royo, and their three children, Marta Elena, Natalia, and Arístides José. Her funeral was held at the National Sanctuary in Bella Vista, Panama City on June 24, 2019. Ruiz's ashes were returned to her native Spain, where they were partially buried at the Praviano cemetery in Riberas, Asturias. A second funeral mass was held at the Carmelite Catholic Church of Oviedo on October 4, 2019. Shortly before the funeral, her remaining ashes were sprinkled into the Cantabrian Sea by her husband and children.

In December 2019, Ruiz's daughter, Natalia Royo de Hagerman, was appointed as Panama's ambassador to the United Kingdom.
