= Copyright law of Panama =

Panamanian copyright law

The copyright law of Panama is primarily based on 1994 legislation, known as Law 15. The history of Panamanian intellectual property legislation dates to the 19th century. Only recently has copyright in Panama became seriously enforced, with past international criticism focusing on insufficient effort to enforce intellectual property laws. A new 2012 law has attracted concerns in the opposite direction, with many criticising it for being too draconian.

== History ==
Some provisions for copyright in Panama date to 1826, and Panama has been a party to a number of international copyright treaties throughout the 20th century. The modern copyright law in Panama is based on a 1994 law. The Panamanian National Assembly in August 1994 passed a comprehensive copyright bill (Law 15), based on a World Intellectual Property Organization model. The law modernizes copyright protection in Panama, provides for payment of royalties, facilitates the prosecution of copyright violators, protects computer software, and makes copyright infringement a felony, with a fine up to $20,000, handed by the National Office of Copyright at the Panamanian Ministry of Education. The law also recognizes the existence of moral rights. The length of duration of copyright is 50 years after the author's death, or the publication of an anonymous work.

The Law 23 of 1996 created the Intellectual Property Interdisciplinary Commission, which oversees many copyright-related cases in Panama.

In September 2012 Panama passed a new copyright law (Bill 510). The bill is a result of negotiations in the Panama–United States Trade Promotion Agreement. The new law gives the Panamanian copyright office (General Department of Copyright, DGDA) the power to fine those found to have violated copyright through file-sharing, and hand out fines of $100,000 ($200,000 on second offense); the offenders have fifteen days to defend themselves before being arrested. The fines would be kept by the copyright office, which has the right to use them for salary bonuses, with none of them passed to the copyright holders. The copyright infringers however may still be separately sued by the copyright holder. The 2012 has also limited the applications of fair use in Panama.

== Criticisms ==
Although the lead prosecutor for intellectual property rights cases in the Panamanian Attorney General's Office has been involved in a number of prosecutions, the Panamanian Copyright Office has been described by a 2001 US report as "small and ineffective". According to that report, the Panamanian Copyright Office has been slow to draft and move forward further improvements to the Copyright Law to implement the new WIPO treaties (the WIPO Copyright Treaty and the WIPO Performances and Phonographs Treaty). Nevertheless, their proposal also would establish new offenses, such as for internet-based copyright violations, raise the penalties for infractions, and enhance border measures. The legislation has been moving forward with technical assistance from SIECA (the Central American Economic Integration System).

The 2012 law has attracted criticism from free culture and digital rights activists (such as the Electronic Frontier Foundation), both in Panama and abroad. It has been called "draconian" and "incredibly unbalanced"; Andres Guadamuz from Technollama, quoted by Cory Doctorow, the EFF and others, has called it "the worst [copyright law] in the history of the universe." EFF noted that the new law violates the principle of due process. The bill has been widely unknown to the Panamian public as of the moment it passed its legislation, and not subject to any significant public debate. The activists have criticized the US government for giving in to the entertainment industry by putting pressure on Panama and other Latin American countries, forcing them to adopt what they see as less progressive copyright bills, infringing on free speech in detriment to the public interest.

== Copyright term ==
When the author is known, economic rights are protected for the life of the author plus an additional 50 years after the author's death.
