= Pedro Miguel González =

Panamanian politician (born 1965)

- Born: Pedro Miguel González Pinzón; January 1, 1965 (age 61)
- Occupation: Politician
- Known for: political career, Zak Hernández murder allegations
- Political party: Democratic Revolutionary Party (PRD)
- Parent: Gerardo González Vernaza

Pedro Miguel González Pinzón (born January 1, 1965) is a leading political figure in Panama who was tried and acquitted by a Panamian court of the June 10, 1992, killing of a US Army serviceman, Sgt. Zak Hernández, and the serious wounding of another, Sgt. Ronald T. Marshall.

In addition to serving as a deputy in the National Assembly, where he represented the province of Veraguas for the ruling Democratic Revolutionary Party (PRD), he served as President of the unicameral National Assembly from September 1, 2007, elected by a vote of 50-26 (defeating his rival Wigberto Quintero of the Nationalist Republican Liberal Movement), until August 31, 2008.

== Early life ==
Pedro Miguel González Pinzón was born on January 1, 1965, to Gerardo González Vernaza (1929–2006), a Panamanian politician who served as President of the National Assembly from 1997 to 1999, as well as acting as the head of the PRD party.

== Alleged involvement in Hernandez murder ==
On June 10, 1992, United States Army Sgt. Zak Hernández-LaPorte and Sgt. Ronald T. Marshall were ambushed while driving in their Humvee at an entrance to Albrook Air Base on the outskirts of Panama City. A group of gunmen fired at the pair with an AK-47 from a civilian car before making their escape. Marshall was seriously injured, while Hernández died from his wounds. The murder occurred two-and-a-half years after the US invasion of Panama to depose military ruler Manuel Noriega, and just prior to a visit by US President George H. W. Bush.

González was immediately the prime suspect, and a warrant was issued for his arrest. According to a lawyer for the US Embassy, three witnesses stated he was present at the scene, while others saw him and two accomplices in the stolen car used in the shooting. The car was later found on a farm owned by his father. The US Federal Bureau of Investigation matched an AK-47 from the attacks was found on the farm as well, while Scotland Yard and the Panamanian police did not find the AK-47 to match the bullets from the shootings.

== Legal proceedings ==
Though an arrest warrant was issued for González shortly after the murder, he evaded arrest for more than two years, reportedly spending part of this time in Cuba. In 1995, he surrendered directly to new President Ernesto Perez Balladares on live national television, accompanied by his father. González's father stated that the unusual circumstances were needed "to avoid an attempt on the kid's life". He accused the previous Guillermo Endara administration of "judicial terrorism" and stated that under the Perez Balladares administration, his son could receive a fair trial.

González was held for the following two years in an air-conditioned jail cell with a computer and cell phone, during which his trial was repeatedly delayed. Jaime Abad Espinosa, the Panamanian police official who had led the investigation into the murder, was forced to resign, and was accused by González's father of suppressing ballistics evidence proving González's innocence. Abad was later arrested and tried on the charge. Panamanian human rights groups protested on Abad's behalf, with the Panamanian Center for the Investigation of Human Rights and Judicial Assistance stating that the "unaccustomed dispatch" with which Abad's case was handled indicated that its "clear purpose is that its result influence the result of the other case". Abad was found guilty of removing evidence and fined, but was pardoned on June 28, 1998, by Perez Balladares.

In late 1997, González was brought to trial and acquitted. The US State Department objected to the verdict, calling it "inconsistent with persuasive testimony by credible and disinterested witnesses as well as firearm and other physical evidence". The Washington Post described the verdict as an "outrage" that showed that US soldiers must leave the country following the handover of the Panama Canal.

González was also indicted by a US grand jury for his alleged role in the killing shortly after it took place. He remained wanted by the US as of 2007.

== Presidency of National Assembly ==
After being elected twice to the National Assembly of Panama as a PRD candidate, González was selected by his party on September 1, 2007, to serve as the body's president. His assumption of the presidency was protested by the US, which described him as a fugitive. The move came during the negotiation of the Panama–United States Trade Promotion Agreement, and several members of the US Congress stated that they would oppose ratification of the pact until González was removed from office. Gonzalez called his election in the face of US opposition a demonstration of Panamanian independence, stating, "The era in which the U.S. had the last word in determining who governed our nation and how they did so is over."

González's appointment caused controversy within Panama, particularly due to its threatening of the free trade pact. In one poll, most Panamanians stated that González should step down. However, González's backers stated that the US opposition to his leadership was another chapter in a long history of US interference in Panamanian affairs, and rejected it as inappropriate. Former Panamanian President Guillermo Endara stated that he believed González to be guilty of the murder, though he opposed the trade agreement. President Martín Torrijos, a fellow PRD member who had negotiated the trade pact, made a private request for González to resign, but avoided publicly criticizing him.

His election also created concern beyond Panama's borders. In the United States territory of {Puerto Rico}, where {Zak Hernández Laporte} was born, the {Puerto Rico Senate} approved Senate Resolution 3342, which expressed concern that a Panamanian indicted for Hernández-Laporte's murder had been elected to one of Panama's top leadership positions. The resolution was authored by then Senate President {Kenneth McClintock} and was approved by an overwhelming margin the same day it had been filed.

In December 2007, the National Assembly declared December 20 to be an official day of mourning for those Panamanians killed during the 1989 invasion by the United States. González supported the action, stating that "All political sectors have wanted to cast a blanket of forgetfulness ... Maybe out of shame or for other reasons, but it isn't fair to all of those Panamanians that still lie in common graves."

In January 2008, after ceremonies in Panama marking Martyr's Day (remembering students killed in a 1964 clash with U.S. soldiers over the Panama Canal), the web site of the Panamanian legislature was hacked to display an image of the US flag; the website was then down for three weeks. The Guardian described the hackers as apparently angry about González's election.

On March 7, 2008, it was announced that González would not seek reelection as head of the National Assembly when his term ended on August 31. After a long delay, US President Barack Obama resubmitted the trade pact to the US Congress, which approved it on October 13, 2011.
