= Panama–United States Trade Promotion Agreement =

2012 free trade agreement

The Panama–United States Trade Promotion Agreement (Spanish: Tratado de Libre Comercio entre Panamá y Estados Unidos or TLC) is a bilateral free trade agreement between Panama and the United States that has been in effect since October 2012. Stated objectives include eliminating obstacles to trade, consolidating access to goods and services and favoring private investment in and between both nations. Apart from commercial issues, it incorporates economic, institutional, intellectual-property, labor and environmental policies, among others.

The negotiations were officially completed on December 19, 2006, though elements were still to be renegotiated. The agreement was signed on 28 June 2007, and Panama's National Assembly ratified it the following 11 July, before the 1200-page document had been translated into Spanish.

== Concerns ==
The treaty has been said to be one of the main reasons for 2012 changes to copyright law of Panama, changes which have attracted a number of criticism from free culture and digital rights activists. The activists have criticized the U.S. government for giving in to the entertainment industry by putting pressure on Panama and other Latin American countries, forcing them to adopt what they see as less progressive copyright bills, infringing on free speech in detriment to the public interest.

On September 1, 2007, Pedro Miguel González Pinzón, who had been indicted by a U.S. grand jury for the murder of United States Army Sgt. Zak Hernández, was elected President of the National Assembly of Panama. Several members of the U.S. Congress stated that they would oppose the treaty while he held the post. González's appointment also caused controversy within Panama, particularly due to its threatening of the free trade pact. In one poll, most Panamanians stated that González should step down. However, González's backers stated that the U.S. opposition to his leadership was another chapter in a long history of American interference in Panamanian affairs, and rejected it as inappropriate. Former Panamanian President Guillermo Endara stated that he believed González to be guilty of the murder, though he opposed the trade agreement. President Martín Torrijos, a fellow PRD member who had negotiated the trade pact, made a private request for González to resign, but avoided publicly criticizing him. On March 7, 2008, it was announced that González would not seek reelection as head of the National Assembly when his term ended on August 31.

== Approval ==
In the 112th U.S. Congress, the ascendancy of the Republican Party in the House of Representative led to new pressures to approve all three pending fast track free trade agreements (Colombia, Panama, and South Korea). Finally, in October 2011, President Obama submitted the three trade pacts to the Congress, and they were quickly passed. On October 12, 2011, the U.S.-Panama TPA was passed in the House by a vote of 300-129 (H.R. 3079) and in the Senate by a vote of 77-22 (S. 1643). President Obama signed the pact on October 21, 2011 (P.L. 112-43, 125 Stat. 427) and the agreement entered into force October 31, 2012.

== Criticism ==
On October 12, 2011, Senator Bernie Sanders (I-VT) criticized the Panama-United States Trade Promotion Agreement, arguing that Panama is a world leader in tax evasion and avoidance."

Panama's entire annual economic output is only $26.7 billion a year, or about two-tenths of 1 percent of the U.S. economy. No one can legitimately make the claim that approving this free trade agreement will significantly increase American jobs. Then, why would we be considering a stand-alone free trade agreement with Panama, tiny little country?

Well, it turns out that Panama is a world leader when it comes to allowing wealthy Americans and large corporations to evade U.S. taxes by stashing their cash in offshore tax havens. And the Panama free trade agreement will make this bad situation much worse. Each and every year, the wealthiest people in our country and the largest corporations evade about $100 billion in U.S. taxes through abusive and illegal offshore tax havens in Panama and in other countries. So, according to Citizens for Tax Justice — and I quote — "A tax haven... has one of three characteristics: It has no income tax or a very low-rate income tax; it has bank secrecy laws; and it has a history of non-cooperation with other countries on exchanging information about tax matters. Panama has all three of those. ... They're probably the worst."

– Bernie Sanders, October 12, 2011

After the Panama Papers leak on April 3, 2016, by the International Consortium of Investigative Journalists and Süddeutsche Zeitung, Sanders' criticism of the Panama Free Trade Agreement was brought back as a talking point.

== See also ==
- United States free-trade agreements
- House Trade Working Group
- Rules of Origin
- Market access
- Free-trade area
- Tariffs
