= José de Jesús Martínez =

Panamanian poet, playwright, philosopher, pilot, and mathematician

- Born: June 8, 1929; Managua, Nicaragua
- Died: January 27, 1991 (aged 61); Panama
- Other names: Chuchú Martínez; Sergeant Chuchú
- Occupations: Poet, playwright, philosopher, pilot, mathematician
- Known for: Aide to Omar Torrijos; subject in Graham Greene's Getting to Know the General
- Awards: National Theater Prize (Madrid); Premio Ricardo Miró; Casa de las Américas Prize

José de Jesús Martínez (also known as "Chuchú Martínez" or "Sergeant Chuchú") (June 8, 1929, in Managua – January 27, 1991, in Panama) was a poet, playwright, philosopher, pilot and mathematician and a former aide to General Omar Torrijos Herrera, ruler of Panama from 1968 to 1981. Through his association with Torrijos, Martínez became a major figure in Graham Greene's 1984 book Getting to Know the General: The Story of an Involvement.

== Early life ==
Martínez was born in Managua in 1929.

== Career ==
Martínez became a Panamanian citizen and an aide to General Omar Torrijos Herrera, ruler of Panama from 1968 to 1981. Martínez was known as "Chuchú Martínez" in the intellectual circles, and later as "Sergeant Chuchú" among the military.

Martínez was professor of Marxist philosophy at Panama University and also professor of mathematics.

In literature, Martínez was awarded the National Theater Prize in Madrid in 1952 for his play, La Perrera. In 1969 and 1971 he won Panama's national literary prize Premio Ricardo Miró for his plays and philosophical essays. For his book, Mi General Torrijos (1987) he won Cuba's Casa de Las Americas prize.

Through his association with Torrijos, Martínez became a major figure in Graham Greene's 1984 book Getting to Know the General: The Story of an Involvement.

== Death ==
Martínez died, aged 61, in 1991.

== Selected publications ==
- La perrera. c. 1952.
- Enemigos. 1962.
- Aquí, ahora. 1963.
- Poemas a ella. 1963.
- La retreta. 1964.
- Amor no a ti, contigo. 1965.
- Poemas a mí. 1966.
- Amanecer de Ulises. 1967.
- One Way. 1967.
- 0 y van 3. 1970.
- Teatro. San José, Costa Rica, 1971.
- El caso Dios. 1975.
- Mi General Torrijos. 1987.
