= Carlos Ozores =

Panamanian politician and diplomat

Carlos Ozores Typaldos

Vice President of Panama
- In office February 1984 – October 1984
- Preceded by: Jorge Illueca
- Succeeded by: Eric Arturo Delvalle

Vice President of Panama
- In office September 1989 – 20 December 1989
- Preceded by: Roderick Esquivel
- Succeeded by: Ricardo Arias Calderón

Personal details
- Born: August 7, 1940 Panama City, Panama
- Died: March 11, 2016 (aged 75)
- Party: Democratic Revolutionary Party

Carlos Ozores Typaldos (7 August 1940 – 11 March 2016) was a Panamanian politician and diplomat who served as First Vice President of Panama twice in 1984, and in 1989.

Son of Renato Ozores and Rita Irene Typaldos Duque, he was born in Panama City (c. August 7, 1940). After he graduated from law he achieved in Italy a PhD in International Law. In 1969, he returned to Panama and the following year began his diplomatic career as vice chancellor and foreign minister.

He was among the diplomats of the Panamanian delegation to the Torrijos-Carter Treaties two treaties signed by the United States and Panama in Washington, D.C., on September 7, 1977, which abrogated the Hay–Bunau-Varilla Treaty of 1903. The treaties guaranteed that Panama would gain control of the Panama Canal after 1999, ending the control of the canal that the U.S. had exercised since 1903.

In 1981, he signed with his counterpart, Colombian foreign Minister Diego Uribe Vargas, the Treaty of Montería, which provided the rights of Colombia for the Canal traffic. He was appointed ambassador to the United Nations from 1981 to 1983, where in November 1982 he served as President of the United Nations Security Council.

After a short period as a Minister for the Government of Panama and a first term as the Vice President of Panama in 1984, he resumed his diplomatic career and was Panamaian ambassador to Spain, Canada, and later, after a period of political inactivity, to Colombia. Ozores served as the Vice President of Panama again in 1989. He was also secretary of the Democratic Revolutionary Party.

Political offices
Preceded by Jorge Illueca	Vice President of Panama; 1984	Succeeded by Eric Arturo Delvalle
Preceded by Roderick Esquivel	Vice President of Panama; 1989	Succeeded by Ricardo Arias Calderón
Diplomatic posts
Preceded by Hazem Nuseibeh	President of the United Nations Security Council; November 1982	Succeeded by Wlodzimierz Natorf
