= Florencio Flores Aguilar =

Panamanian army officer (c.1931–2020)

Florencio Flores
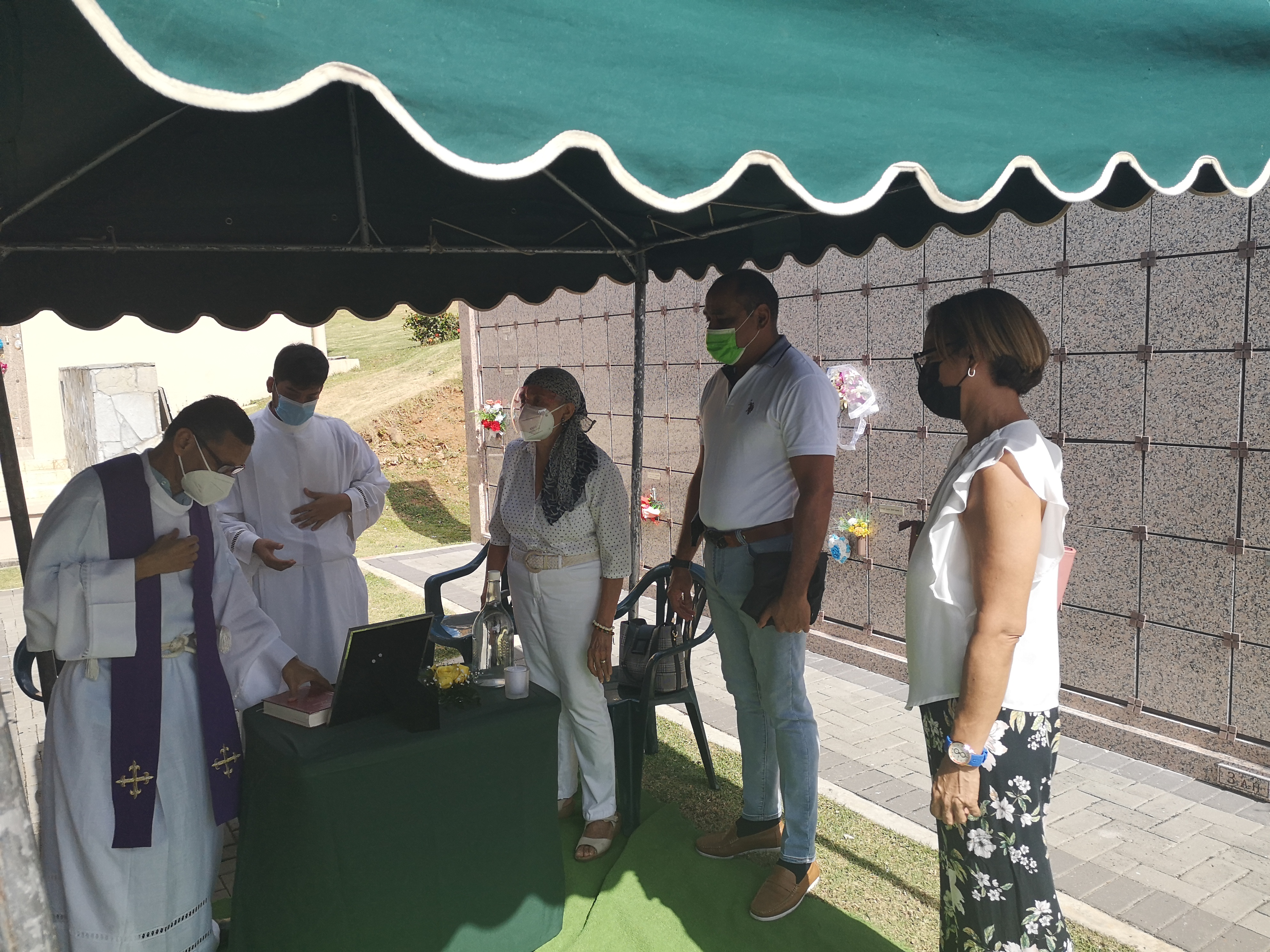
- Colonel Florencio Flórez's mass

Commander of Panamanian National Guard
- In office 31 July 1981 – 3 March 1982
- President: Arístides Royo
- Preceded by: Omar Torrijos
- Succeeded by: Rubén Darío Paredes

Personal details
- Born: Florencio Flores Aguilar c. 1931
- Died: March 28, 2020 (aged 88–89) Santa Fe Hospital, Panama City, Panama

Colonel Florencio 'Chito' Flores Aguilar (c. 1931 – 28 March 2020) was a Panamanian army officer.

Flores served as Commander of the Panamanian National Guard following the death of General Omar Torrijos on 31 July 1981. Colonel Flores assumed command of the Panamanian military, but unlike his predecessor or his successors, he did not exercise his power as a military leader of Panama. He was displaced in March 1982 by Colonel Rubén Darío Paredes.

Military offices
Preceded by Omar Torrijos	Commander of Panamanian National Guard; 1981–1982	Succeeded by Rubén Darío Paredes
