= Ricardo de la Espriella =

President of Panama (1982–1984)

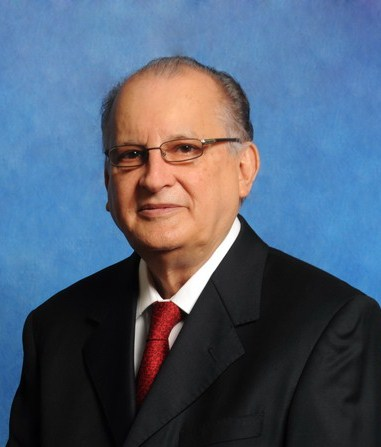
- De la Espriella in 2010

28th President of Panama
- In office 31 July 1982 – 13 February 1984
- Military Leader: Rubén Darío Paredes; Manuel Noriega
- Vice President: Jorge Illueca
- Preceded by: Arístides Royo
- Succeeded by: Jorge Illueca

3rd Vice President of Panama
- In office 11 October 1978 – 31 July 1982
- President: Arístides Royo
- Preceded by: Gerardo González
- Succeeded by: Jorge Illueca

Personal details
- Born: Ricardo de la Espriella Toral; 5 September 1934 (age 92) Panama City, Panama
- Party: Democratic Revolutionary Party
- Spouse: Mercedes Martinez
- Children: 4
- Education: Panama University

Ricardo de la Espriella Toral (born 5 September 1934) is a Panamanian politician who was the President of Panama from 31 July 1982 to 13 February 1984.

== Early career ==
Ricardo de la Espriella has an economics degree from Stanford University and a law degree from University of Florida. Espriella was the general manager of National Bank of Panama from 1970 to 1978, when he became Vice President of Panama on 11 October 1978. This made him the designated successor to President Arístides Royo in July 1982 when Royo was forced out by the National Guard, then controlled by General Rubén Darío Paredes.

As vice president, De la Espriella was also head of the National Finance Commission (Comision Financiera Nacional or CFN) before Royo's resignation.

== Presidency ==
De la Espriella was a puppet president during a period when the country had only a "democratic façade." His regime was first under the control of General Paredes and later Manuel Noriega once Paredes resigned in 1983. Being a competent financial manager, he posed no threat to the dominant influence of the National Guard, and wasted no time in referring to them as "a partner in power".

De la Espriella immediately formed a new cabinet that included independents and members of the Liberal Party and his own party, the PRD; Jorge Illueca, Royo's foreign minister, became the new vice president. Meanwhile, Colonel Armando Contreras became chief of staff of the National Guard, until December 1982, when Noriega took over that position.

When De la Espriella took the oath as Interim President, General Paredes immediately decreed that certain Panamanian newspapers be shut down including "La Prensa", which had built a strong reputation for opposition to the ruling military dictatorship. Paredes gave orders to attack the newspaper which resulted in smashing the newspaper's windows and typewriters as well as injury to one of the press operators and the director of the Central American Institute of Business Administration, who was delivering a press release from his institution and whose suit and tie caused him to be mistaken for the "La Prensa" director.

In July, 1983, De la Espriella and three other leaders of Central and South American countries, known as the Contadora Four, met and authored the Cancún Declaration on Peace in Central America, sending the text to the UN as well as to President Ronald Reagan. On 26 July 1983, Reagan wrote a brief letter to each of the Contadora Four, thanking and congratulating them and sharing the principles the United States held must be part of any long term solution.

De la Espriella remained public and appeared in Time magazine, Newsweek, and other magazines - one of which printed a 1983 photo of him sitting next to then-Vice President George H. W. Bush who sat alongside a young, uniformed Manuel Noriega.

In February 1984, De la Espriella was pressured by Noriega and his reorganized National Defense Forces to reshuffle his cabinet to include supporters of Nicolás Ardito Barletta. When he seemingly balked at that, he was summoned away from his family and flown to a meeting in the capital with Noriega and Colonel Roberto Díaz Herrera after which De la Espriella was forced to resign abruptly.

Since 1985, he has served as a president of a consulting and investment firm Ret Corporation. In 2007, he started a nine-year term as a member of the board of the Panama Canal Authority.

Political offices
Preceded by Gerardo González Vernaza	Vice President of Panama; 1978–1982	Succeeded by Jorge Illueca
Preceded by Arístides Royo	President of Panama; 1982–1984	Succeeded by Jorge Illueca
