= Jorge Illueca =

Vice President of Panama (1982–1984) & 25th President of Panama (1984)

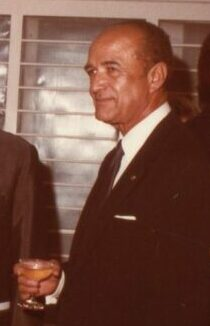
- Illueca in 1984

29th President of Panama
- In office 13 February 1984 – 11 October 1984
- Military Leader: Manuel Noriega
- Vice President: Carlos Ozores
- Preceded by: Ricardo de la Espriella
- Succeeded by: Nicolás Ardito Barletta

4th Vice President of Panama
- In office 31 July 1982 – 13 February 1984
- President: Ricardo de la Espriella
- Preceded by: Ricardo de la Espriella
- Succeeded by: Carlos Ozores
International organization offices
President of the United Nations General Assembly
In office 1983–1984
Preceded by	Imre Hollai
Succeeded by	Paul J. F. Lusaka

Personal details
- Born: Jorge Enrique Illueca Sibauste; September 17, 1918 Panama City, Panama
- Died: May 3, 2012 (aged 93) Panama City, Panama
- Education: University of Panama; Harvard University; University of Chicago

Jorge Enrique Illueca Sibauste (September 17, 1918 – May 3, 2012) was a Panamanian politician and diplomat who served as 25th President of Panama in 1984.

== Biography ==
Illueca was born in Panama City, Panama. He attended the University of Panama, Harvard University and the University of Chicago (Doctor of Law, 1955). He became one of the most important lawyers in his country, taught as a professor at the University of Panama, and by the 1970s had begun his diplomatic career, at first working at the United Nations on international law issues. He served as Ambassador of Panama to the United Nations from 1976 to 1981, and as Minister of Foreign Affairs of Panama from 1981 to 1983.

In 1982 he was elected Vice President of Panama, and served as President for a few months in 1984 following the president's resignation until new elections in which he did not run. Also during this time, he was president of the UN General Assembly from 1983 to 1984. He served as a member of the Permanent Court of Arbitration at The Hague from 1974 to 1990 and as a member of the United Nations International Law Commission three times (1982–1986, 1987–1991 and 1997–2001). He continued to work for the United Nations, particularly on environmental issues.

He was known to be an outspoken opponent of the US Army's School of the Americas, which he called "the biggest base for destabilization in Latin America.”

His first daughter, Irene, had one son (Daniel King) through her first marriage. She remarried and later adopted 2 of her grandchildren (Christian and Skyla). His eldest son Jorge Jr had 3 children from his first marriage (David, Jorge Jr Jr and Angelica). And later on five more came along from his second marriage (Helena, Emilia, Cecilia, Christa, and Eliza).

Political offices
Preceded by Ricardo de la Espriella	Vice President of Panama; 1982–1984	Succeeded by Carlos Ozores
Preceded by Ricardo de la Espriella	President of Panama; February 1984 – October 1984	Succeeded by Nicolás Ardito Barletta
Diplomatic posts
Preceded by Imre Hollai	President of the United Nations General Assembly; 1983–1984	Succeeded by Paul J. F. Lusaka
