= 1981 Panamanian Air Force Twin Otter crash =

1981 aviation accident

Coordinates: 8°41′25.0686″N 80°34′25.6758″W

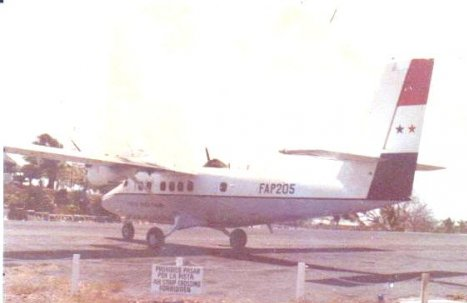
- FAP-205, the aircraft involved in the crash

Accident
- Date: July 31, 1981
- Summary: Crashed in adverse weather; cause disputed
- Site: Marta Hill, Coclesito, near Coclé Province, Panama

Aircraft
- Aircraft type: de Havilland Canada DHC-6 Twin Otter
- Operator: Panama Air Force
- Registration: FAP-205
- Flight origin: Rio Hato Airport
- Stopover: Penonomé Airport
- Destination: Coclesito Airport
- Occupants: 7
- Passengers: 5
- Crew: 2
- Fatalities: 7
- Survivors: 0

On July 31, 1981, a de Havilland Canada DHC-6 Twin Otter of the Panamanian Air Force crashed in Marta Hill, in the community of Coclesito, in adverse weather conditions while on its final approach to Coclesito airport. All seven people on board, including General Omar Torrijos Herrera, who led the country's military dictatorship between 1968 and 1981, were killed.

The investigation into the crash was surrounded by controversy and speculation about the circumstances of how the aircraft crashed. The crash occurred shortly after Ronald Reagan assumed office as President of the United States and three months after Ecuadorian president Jaime Roldós Aguilera died in similar circumstances.

The cause of the crash remains disputed.

== Details of crash ==
At 10:44 a.m. on July 31, 1981, FAP-205 took off from the Rio Hato air base, headed for Coclesito airport, to visit local residents. At the controls were captain Azael Adames and sub-lieutenant Victor Rangel as co-pilot. The passengers on the flight were General Omar Torrijos Herrera, mechanic Carlos E. Rivera, Sergeant Ricardo Machazek, bodyguard assistant Jaime Correa, and dentist Teresa Ferreiro. The plane landed at Penonomé Airport at 10:55 a.m. for a stopover, which ended at 11:40 a.m. At that time, the flight was only 15 minutes from its final destination.

There is much controversy about how the plane crashed. It is known that the plane intended to land at Coclesito in very bad weather. It disappeared from radar between 11:55 a.m. and 12:05 p.m., but ATC did not declare an emergency for nearly a day, because of the limited nature of Panama's radar coverage at the time. The government knew about the plane's disappearance, but did not comment until the rescue mission was organized.

On August 1, the media reported the disappearance of the plane and the government declared the disappearance of Torrijos. At 11:30 p.m. of the same day, Panamanian authorities, with the support of the US military, found the first remains of the aircraft on Marta Hill, 3,100 feet above sea level. All seven people on board, including Torrijos, were killed. The plane, except for the tail section, was destroyed by the impact against the mountain.

The news about Torrijos' death caused a crisis in the military dictatorship and nationwide mourning in Panama. On August 4, a state funeral was held for him in the Casco Viejo Metropolitan Cathedral. He was buried in Casco Viejo for a brief time, but later transferred to a mausoleum in the Canal Zone at Fort Amador, near Panama City.

== Investigations ==
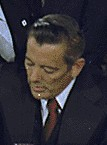
Omar Torrijos was among the dead of the crash.

After recovering the bodies, investigations were begun by Panamanian authorities and the FBI. Initially, investigators had some information about circumstances at the time of the accident:

- Marta Hill has an altitude of 3,432 feet and the plane crashed at 3,100 feet.
- Visibility was low, because of bad conditions.
- The crash occurred between 11:55 a.m. and 12:05 p.m.
- In the final moments of the flight, the pilot was trying to see the airport runway between the mountains.
- The damage that appeared in the plane was from the impact and posthumous fire that broke out.

During the investigations, people living in Coclesito claimed that they heard two explosions but had seen nothing, because of the foggy conditions that were surrounding the town that day and informed to the representative Tulio Córdoba about what they heard. This information led to the formation of a rescue squadron of men and women who were living in the town to find the source of the explosion, but found nothing.

=== Speculations and release of report ===
Some people told investigators that the FAP-205 accident was an assassination plot. Some say that Noriega was involved in this, because of his desires to kill Torrijos, in order to rule the country and the National Guard of Panama (which later became the Panamanian Defense Forces). Others say that the CIA was to blame, because they had planned the assassination of Torrijos and Jaime Roldós with a plan called Falcon in Flight. Researchers denied those statements, qualifying them as "false".

In 1983, the inquiry into the accident concluded that the pilots on charge of the flight were to blame for the lack of situational awareness and poor decision-making, which led to the crash.

The cause of this crash was the lack of situational awareness of the pilots in charge regarding vertical navigation, weather conditions, and proximity to terrain, which lead as a consequence to the placing of the airliner into a collision path against the mountain.

Also, they concluded that the plane was in perfect condition at the time of the crash.

The plane had no mechanical failure at the time of the crash and no signs explosives' residues and fuel contamination were detected during the inspection of the wreckage, as well of remains of a in-flight fire.

=== Criticism and controversy ===
The general public and relatives of the victims did not accept the conclusions of the final report, and they accused the military government of a cover-up; moreover, witnesses in Coclesito complained that investigators didn't consider their accounts regarding the crash, excluding their testimonies from the official report. During the final years of the dictatorship, public opinion continued claiming that the investigation should be reopened to find the real cause of the crash, because they claimed that the causes were lacking of sustainable evidence. However, the documents about the crash went missing during the U.S. invasion of Panama and were never found.

After the fall of the military dictatorship in Panama in 1989, in pre-trial hearings in Miami in May 1991, Manuel Noriega's attorney, Frank Rubino, was quoted as saying that "General Noriega has in his possession documents showing attempts of assassinations to him [Noriega] and Mr. Torrijos by secret agencies of the United States, such as the CIA." Those documents were not allowed as evidence in the trial, because the presiding judge agreed with the U.S. government's claim that their public mention would violate the Classified Information Procedures Act. More recently, former businessman John Perkins alleged in his book Confessions of an Economic Hit Man that Torrijos was assassinated by American interests, who had had a bomb planted aboard his aircraft (by CIA-organized operatives). The alleged motive is that some American business leaders and politicians strongly opposed the negotiations between Torrijos and a group of Japanese businessmen led by Shigeo Nagano, who were promoting the idea of a new, larger, sea-level canal for Panama. Manuel Noriega, in America's Prisoner, claims that these negotiations had evoked an extremely unfavorable response in American circles.

However, these facts were not enough to start a new investigation for further proofs. As a consequence, the FAP-205 crash case was declared unsolved due to lack of evidence.

== Aftermath ==
After the accident, Panama's Tocumen International Airport was renamed Omar Torrijos International Airport until 1989, when United States invaded the country to depose Noriega and its original name was re-established. The mountainous area where the wreckage of the airplane can be found is now part of Omar Torrijos National Park, which was opened in 1986 and is a major tourist attraction for its natural hiking trails. The rural house where Torrijos talked to the people of Coclesito and held his political meetings is now a memorial museum.

The day of Torrijos' death is commemorated each year by the PRD political party, along with the peasantry and indigenous class of Panama.
