= Arístides Royo =

23rd President of Panama (1978–1982)

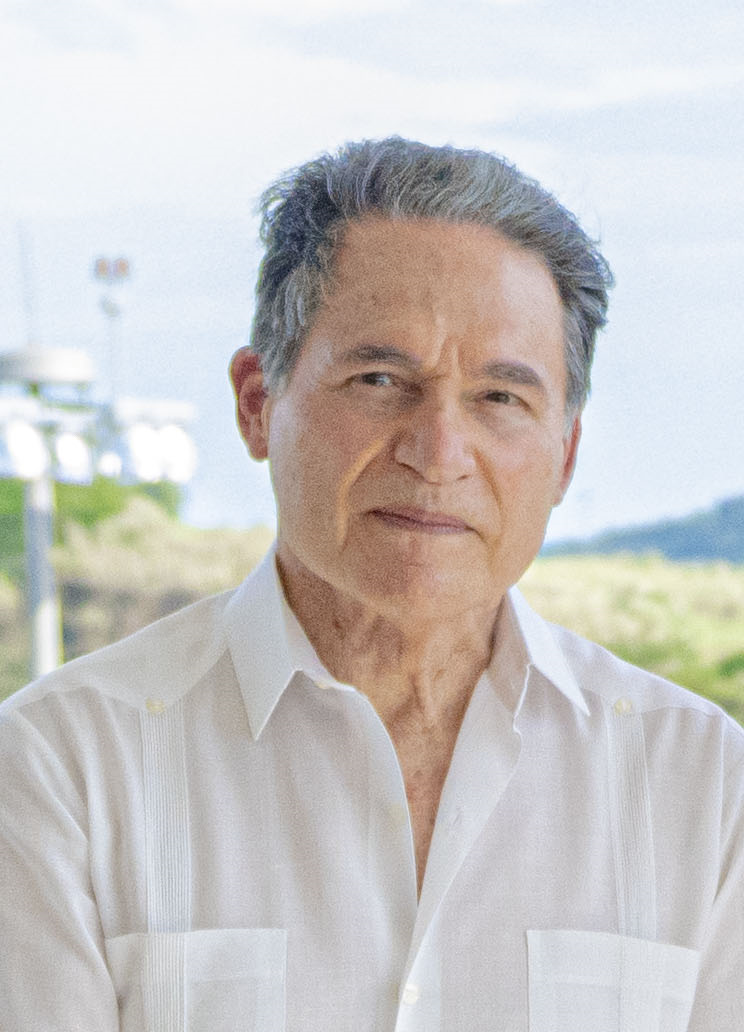
- Official portrait, 2022

23rd President of Panama
- In office 11 October 1978 – 31 July 1982
- Military Leader: Omar Torrijos Herrera; Florencio Flores Aguilar; Rubén Darío Paredes
- Vice President: Ricardo de la Espriella
- Preceded by: Demetrio B. Lakas
- Succeeded by: Ricardo de la Espriella

Minister for Panama Canal Affairs
- In office 1 July 2019 – 30 June 2024
- President: Laurentino Cortizo
- Preceded by: Roberto Roy
- Succeeded by: José Ramón Icaza

Director of the Panamanian Academy of Language
- Incumbent
- Assumed office 4 October 2018
- Preceded by: Margarita Vásquez

Personal details
- Born: Arístides Royo Sánchez; August 14, 1940 (age 86) La Chorrera, Panama
- Party: Democratic Revolutionary Party
- Spouse: Adela Ruiz de Royo (early 1960s–2019; her death)
- Education: University of Salamanca
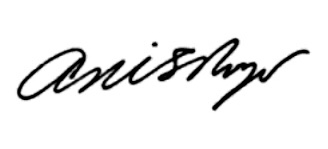
- Signature

Arístides Royo Sánchez (born August 14, 1940) is a Panamanian politician who was 23rd President of Panama from October 11, 1978 to July 31, 1982, when he was pressured to resign by the military. He served as Minister of Canal Affairs until 2024.

== Biography ==
He studied law at the University of Salamanca in Spain, returning to Panama in 1965. In 1960, Royo met his future wife, a Spanish citizen named Adela María Ruiz González, while both were students in Salamanca. They married in the early 1960s and had three children - Marta Elena, Irma Natalia, and Aristides José.

During the military dictatorship, he served as Education Minister from 1973 to 1974 and helped negotiate the Torrijos–Carter Treaties in 1977.

Following his presidency, he was appointed Ambassador to Spain (1994–1996) and France (1998–1999).

Presidents and heads of state of Panama from 1968 to 1989 were mainly appointed by either General Omar Torrijos or General Manuel Noriega, who were the two powerful strongmen during that period. President Jimmy Carter negotiated the Panama Canal treaties with General Torrijos in 1978, which were opposed by the then-presidential candidate Ronald Reagan. Eleven years later, President George H. W. Bush launched the Invasion of Panama to remove General Manuel Noriega from power.

On July 31, 1982, Royo announced that he had a throat ailment that required complete rest, and resigned the presidency. According to a Department of State Report, Royo was ousted as president by Rubén Darío Paredes and the National Guard. He was ousted due to domestic crises that soured the tone of Paredes' forthcoming presidential campaign. He was replaced by Ricard de la Espriella, who was further to the right of Royo and was supported by the National Guard. In 1994, he was appointed Ambassador to Spain due to his personal ties to the country.

However, Royo did get some political power in the timeframe between Torrijos's death in July 1981 and the military takeover by Paredes in March 1982.

He was the minister of affairs related to the Panama Canal from 2019 to 2024. He is also a senior partner at law firm Morgan & Morgan.

Royo's wife, former First Lady Adela Ruiz de Royo, died on 19 June 2019. In December 2019, Royo's daughter, Natalia Royo de Hagerman, was appointed as Panama's ambassador to the United Kingdom.

Political offices
Preceded by Demetrio Lakas	President of Panama; 1978–1982	Succeeded by Ricardo de la Espriella
