= Rubén Darío Paredes =

Panamanian army officer (born 1933)

Military Leader of Panama
- In office 3 March 1982 – 12 August 1983
- President: Arístides Royo; Ricardo de la Espriella
- Preceded by: Florencio Flores
- Succeeded by: Manuel Noriega

Personal details
- Born: Rubén Darío Paredes del Río; 11 August 1933 (age 93) Panama City
- Party: Partido Nacionalista Popular

Rubén Darío Paredes del Río (born 11 August 1933) is a Panamanian army officer who was the military ruler of Panama from 1982 to 1983.

Colonel Paredes came to power after the displacement of Colonel Florencio Flores, due to the instability of the Panamanian National Guard after the death of Omar Torrijos. He was educated at the military academy in Nicaragua. Paredes' tenure as National Guard commander was from March 1982 to August 1983. Paredes was promoted to the rank of general on March 3. In August 1983, Paredes resigned over a dispute concerning the government's attitude towards the United States involvement in Nicaragua. He retired from the Panamanian National Guard after making a deal with Manuel Noriega that would make Paredes president. However, after his resignation, Noriega reneged on the deal and had him arrested. He ran unsuccessfully as president in the 1984 election as a candidate.

Paredes is retired and lives in Panama City, Panama. His uncle, Rigoberto Paredes, was a member of the National Assembly in the 1980s and was alleged to be one of Noriega's closest allies. Rigoberto hosted a talk radio show on Radio BB in Panama City. Rigoberto Paredes died in 2007.

Military offices
Preceded by Omar Torrijos	Military leader of Panama; 1982–1983	Succeeded by Manuel Noriega
