= Panamanian Public Forces =

National security forces of Panama

Panamanian Public Forces Fuerza Pública de Panamá
- Flag of the Republic of Panama
- Common name: Guardia, Policia, Fronterizo
- Abbreviation: FPP
- Motto: "Dios, Honor, y Patria" "God, Honor, and Country"

Agency overview
- Formed: February 10, 1990
- Employees: 30,000 active (as of 2016); 50,000 part-time & reserve agents
- Annual budget: USD 481 million (2011)

Jurisdictional structure
- Operations jurisdiction: PAN
- General nature: Gendarmerie; Civilian police

Operational structure
- Headquarters: Panama City, Panama
- Parent agency: Ministry of Public Security
- Child agencies: National Border Service; National Aeronaval Service; Panamanian National Police; Institutional Protection Service; National Immigration Service

Website
- Ministry of Public Security

The Panamanian Public Forces (Spanish: Fuerza Pública de la República de Panamá, FPP) are the national security forces of Panama. Panama is the second country in Latin America (the other being Costa Rica) to abolish its standing army, with Panama retaining a small paramilitary security force. This came as a result of a U.S. invasion that overthrew a military dictatorship which ruled Panama from 1968 to 1989. The final military dictator, Manuel Noriega, had been belligerent toward the U.S. culminating in the killing of a U.S. Marine lieutenant and U.S. invasion ordered by U.S. President George H. W. Bush.

Panama maintains armed police and internal security forces, and small air and maritime forces. They are tasked with law enforcement and can perform limited military actions. Since 2010 they have reported to the Ministry of Public Security.

== History ==
=== National Army ===
Panama's first army was formed in 1903 when the commander of a brigade of the Colombian army defected to the pro-separation side during Panama's fight for separation from Colombia. His brigade became the Panamanian army. The force was commanded by General Esteban Huertas, who in 1904 tried to overthrow President Manuel Amador Guerrero, but failed. The United States persuaded Panama that a standing army could threaten the security of the Panama Canal Zone. Instead, Panama set up a "National Police." For 48 years, this was the only armed force in Panama. The original small police force was merged into the new organization, and for many years the National Police had a strength of around 1,000 men.

Starting in the late 1930s, the National Police attracted several new recruits who had attended military academies in other Latin American countries. Combined with increased spending on the police, this began a process of militarization. The process sped up under José Remón, who became the Police's commandant (commanding officer) in 1947. He had graduated from Mexico's military academy. He began promoting fewer enlisted men to officer rank, giving the police a more military character.

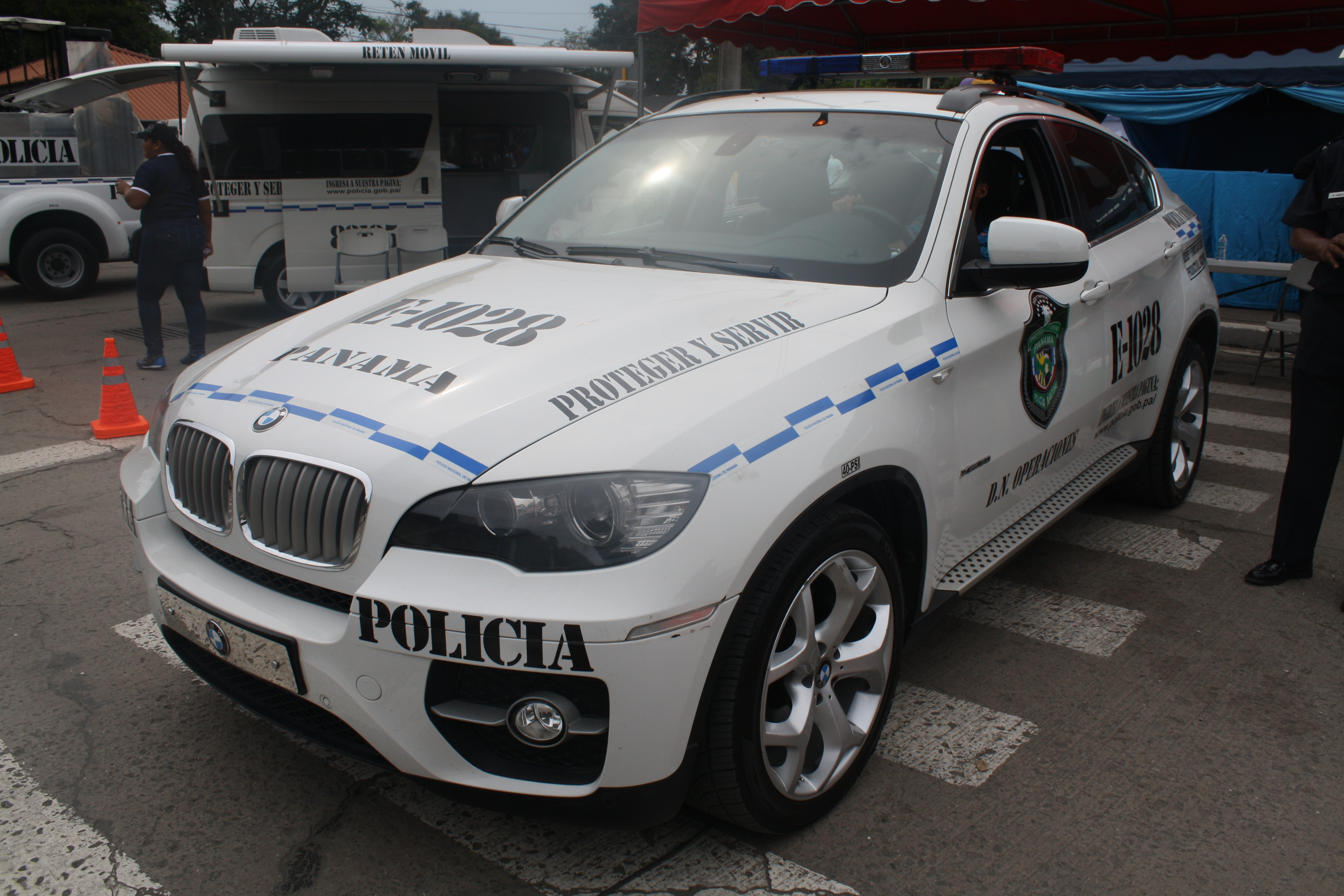
A BMW X6, one of several deluxe vehicles impounded in high-profile cases that were converted to patrol vehicles of the National Police force.

=== National Guard ===
After playing a role in overthrowing two presidents, Remón resigned his commission and ran for president for a coalition that won the elections in 1952. One of his first acts as president was to reorganize the National Police along military lines with a new name, Guardia Nacional de Panamá (National Guard of Panamá). The new grouping retained police functions as well. With a new name came increased American funding. The United States provided training to National Guard personnel in the Canal Zone, and American assistance during the 1950s and 1960s led to the professionalization of the Guard. Officers were increasingly academy graduates instead of former "street cops" promoted from the ranks. The total force had 5,000 men.

In 1968, the Guard overthrew President Arnulfo Arias in a a coup d'état led by Major Boris Martínez and others, including then Major Omar Torrijos, after the newly elected Arias forced senior officers into retirement or assignments in distant provinces by presidential order. They completed the process of converting the Guard into a full-fledged army. In the process, they promoted themselves to full colonels. In 1969, Torrijos thrust Martínez aside, promoted himself to brigadier general, and was the de facto ruler of Panama until his death in a 1981 plane crash.

=== Panama Defense Forces ===
After Torrijos' death, and two successive commanders with lesser political influence, the position was eventually assumed by Manuel Noriega, who restructured all of the National Guard's military and police forces under his command, into the Fuerzas de Defensa de Panamá (Panama Defense Forces). He built the FDP into a structured force, and further consolidated his political power. Under Noriega, the FDP was more a tool of political control, than a force dedicated to national defense and law enforcement.

Besides consolidating his grasp on power by increasing military forces and spending, Noriega increased the power and influence of the PDF Military Intelligence Section (G-2 for its standard military designation), which he commanded prior his rise to power. It became a secret police, feared even inside the PDF ranks. He relied on several loyal military units, like the 7th Inf Co. "Macho de Monte" (Mountain Men, a guerrilla warfare unit named after an aggressive wild boar), the 1st Public Order Co. "Doberman" (a riot police force), the UESAT (Unidades Especiales de Servicio Anti Terror), an Israeli trained counter-terrorism strike force.

That way, he was able to maintain an iron grip on day to day political affairs and survive attempted coups. The "Doberman" Co. was disbanded and replaced by the 2nd Public Order Co. "Centurions" after the "Dobermen" key role in the last coup attempt against Noriega.

Due to the political turmoil of the late 1980s, Noriega formed the civilian paramilitary unit called the Dignity Battalions composed of regular sympathizers and the CODEPADI, formed of civil servants inside public institutions. Both were intended to bolster up forces to be used in case of foreign military action, but were mainly used as shock troops in acts of political repression.

As stated before, the FDP's main role as a tool of political control of the population by intimidation, coercion and direct aggression, instead of the legitimate role of armed forces in national defense, was proved when they showed to be largely ineffective as a combat force during Operation Just Cause, when U.S. Forces invaded Panama and overthrew Noriega in 1989. Only some individuals, including last-minute civilian volunteers who despite opposing the regime considered it their duty to fight against foreign forces, small units, and in some cases the Dignity Battalions, presented more armed resistance.

=== Public Forces ===
In February 1990, the government of then President Guillermo Endara abolished Panama's military and reformed the security apparatus, creating the Panamanian Public Forces. In October 1994, Panama's Legislative Assembly approved a constitutional amendment prohibiting the creation of a standing military force, but allowing the establishment of a special temporary military to counter acts of "external aggression." The PDF was replaced with the Panamanian Public Forces.

By then, the PPF included the National Police, National Maritime Service, National Air Service, Judicial and Technical Police (PTJ) for investigatory activities, and an armed Institutional Protection Service or SPI which consisted mainly of the Presidential Guard. The PPF is also capable of performing limited military duties.

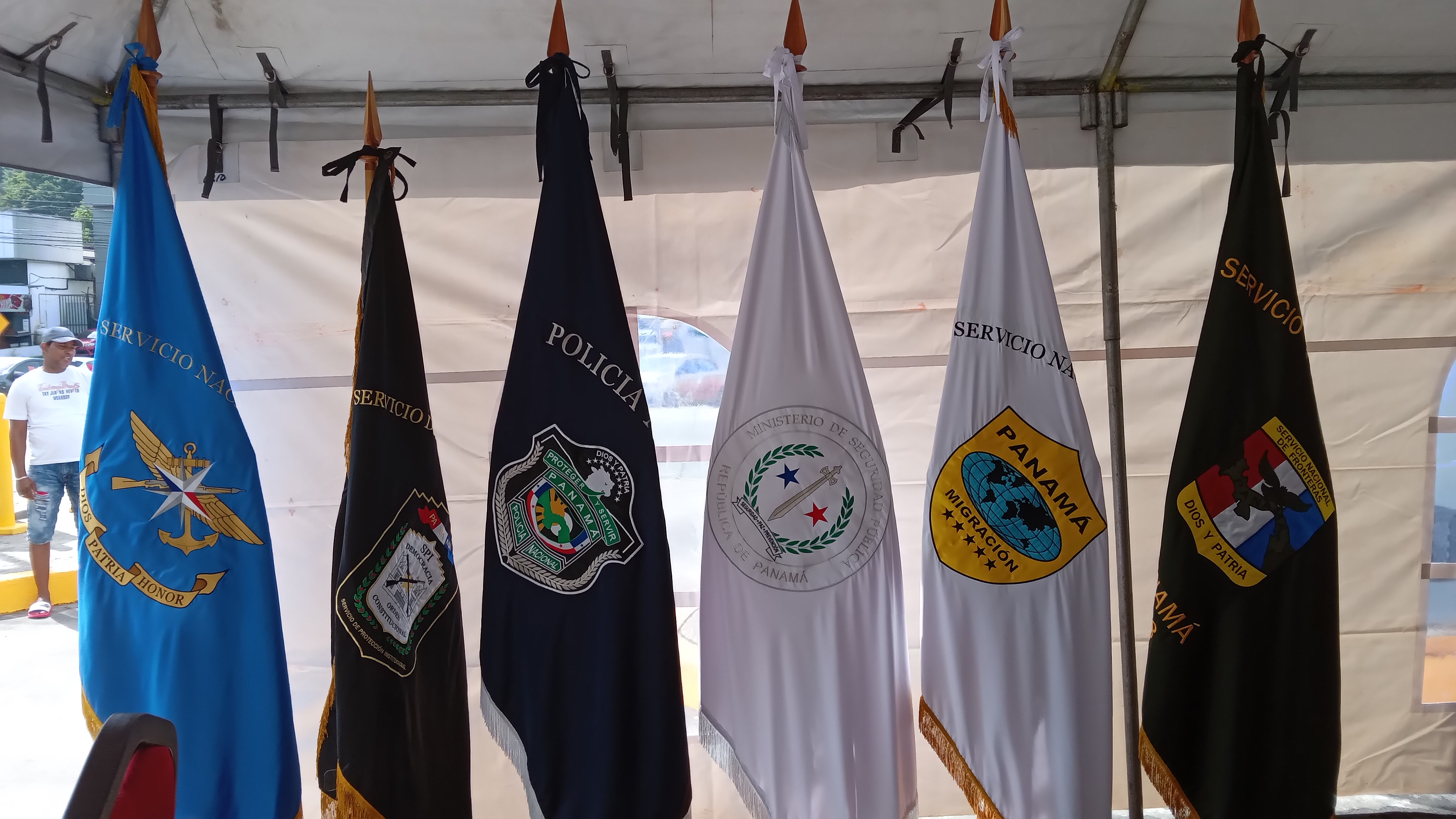
Institutional Flags of the Ministry of Public Security and the Security Establishments of the Public Force of Panama

In contrast to the former PDF, the Panamanian Public Forces is on public record and under control of the elected government.

In 2007, the Judicial and Technical Police (PTJ) was split into the Judicial Investigation Directorate (DIJ), which was merged back into the National Police, and a group of minor technical services that were to remain under the General Attorney's control.

In November 2008, the Servicio Aéreo Nacional (National Air Service) merged with its maritime counterpart, the Servicio Maritimo Nacional (National Maritime Service) to become the Servicio Nacional Aeronaval (National Aeronaval Service). The new Servicio Nacional de Fronteras, the National Borders Service, at the time a special branch of the National Police, was created as an independent force from the National Police, for the defense of the national borders.

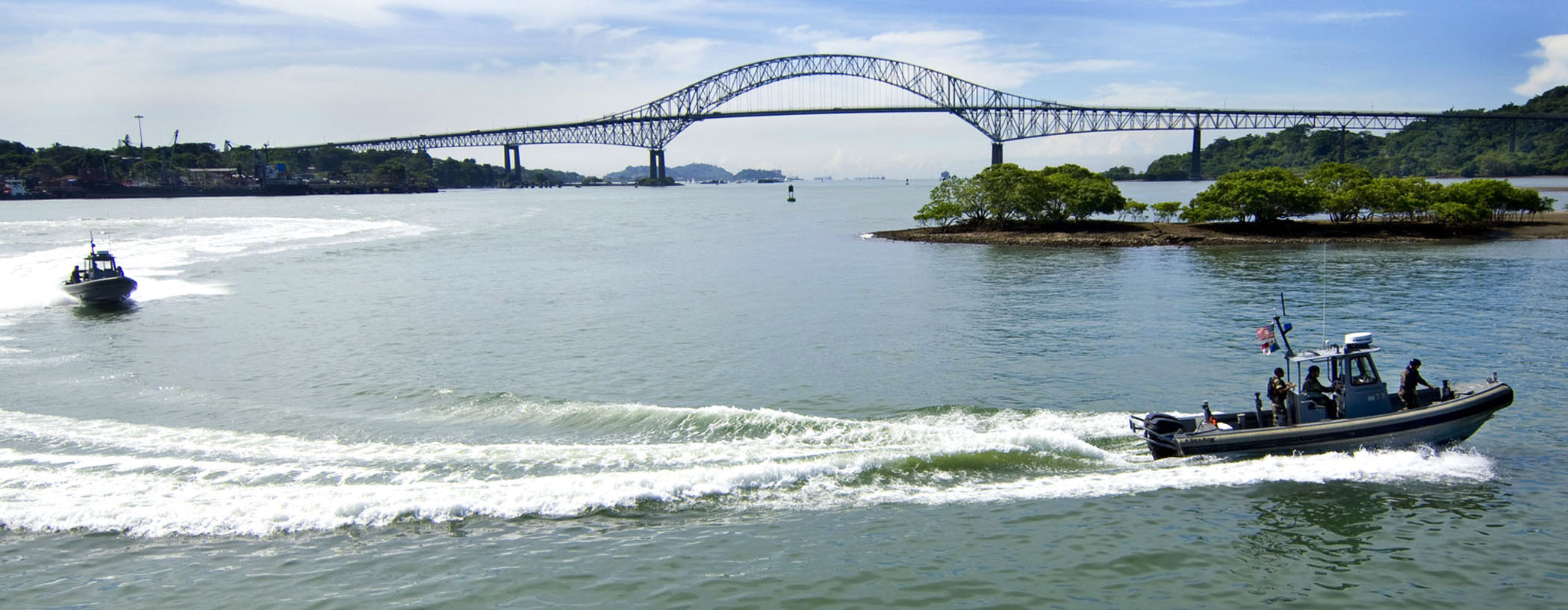
American and Panamanian security forces practice water steering and maneuvering

The following three years were formative for the Panamanian Public Forces. As these institutions endeavored to understand their roles within the greater Government of Panama's strategy and goals, the services struggled for funding, manning, and training to counter Panama's burgeoning threats. While the separate services within the Panamanian Public Forces received varying levels of government support, the Forces writ large respected human rights.

=== New Ministry ===
In February 2010, the new administration led by President Ricardo Martinelli proposed the Ministry of Government and Justice to be divided in two new Ministries:

- The Ministry of Public Security, in charge of security policies and affairs, also oversight of security forces and intelligence agencies including the National Police, National Borders Service, National Aeronaval Service and the National Immigration Service.
- The Government Ministry, an Executive branch in charge of themes related with public governance and internal security.

The Ministry of Public Security was created in April 2010. The Institutional Protection Service reports directly to the Ministry of the Presidency.

=== Immigration, Customs, and Passport Service ===
In 2012, the National Customs Authority, the National Immigration Service (SNM), and the Panama Passport Authority, following advice from the government of the United States of America would merge and form other security sectors autonomous or entity of the Republic of Panama, the Government Executive issued Decree 871 of November 14, 2012 that creates an interagency commission to first handle structuring, coordination, and technical processes for the merger of the first customs and immigration agencies to subsequently merge passports.

The relevant decree for the merger was published in the Official Gazette 27165 of 16 November 2012 as the first step towards that goal. This process never materialized, and all institutions were allowed to follow their path in the same way.

Although not a part of the Public Forces, the new National Immigration Service reports to the Public Security Ministry directly and is regarded as a de facto 5th branch.

== Organization ==
In 2012, the National Police Force's maneuver units comprised:

- One presidential guard battalion (under-strength).
- One military police battalion.
- Eight paramilitary companies.
- 18 police companies.

In 2012, the IISS noted that there were reports of a special forces unit having been formed.

In 2012, the National Public Forces had a total strength of 11,000 personnel and were equipped with small arms. By 2025, the National Police has around 25,000 active duty personnel.

The National Border Service has a division of two brigades, all at the Colombia–Panama border, plus a special forces brigade, an independent brigade patrolling the border with Costa Rica and an infantry brigade responsible for central Panama.

The National Aeronaval Service has a Marine battalion, an aviation security police group, an air group, a naval squadron and SAR unit. The IPS has a full Presidential Guard battalion, plus, starting from 2015, a Pikemen and Musketeers' Company and Cavalry Squad wearing historical uniforms from the 16th to 17th centuries, at the start of Spanish rule in Panama, in the tradition of the Honourable Artillery Company.

Officer training for the PPF is done at the National Police Academy, "Doctor Justo Arosemena" in Panama City. All officers graduate with a bachelor's degree and are commissioned Second Lieutenants. Many officers of the PPF are also graduates of foreign exchange programs in Latin American military and police academies. Training for other ranks is per their respective training commands.

NCOs and basic level constables are trained in the National Police Institute Belisario Porras.

== Ranks ==
National Police
| Rank | Job | Commanded By | Commands | Squad Size | Estimated Personnel |
|---|---|---|---|---|---|
| Agente | General policing, patrols, enforcement | Cabo / Sargento | None | N/A | 10,000+ |
| Cabo | Leads small patrols, supervises agents | Sargento | Agentes | 3–5 | ~1,500 |
| Sargento | Squad leader, oversees field duties | Subteniente / Teniente | Cabos, Agentes | 5–10 | ~800 |
| Subteniente | Junior officer, manages squads | Teniente / Capitán | Sargentos, Cabos | 10–20 | ~500 |
| Teniente | Platoon leader | Capitán | Subtenientes, NCOs | 20–40 | ~300 |
| Capitán | Company commander | Mayor | Tenientes, platoons | 40–100 | ~150 |
| Mayor | District/station-level command | Comisionado | Capitanes, companies | 100–200 | ~100 |
| Comisionado | Provincial leader, strategic command | Director General | All regional commands | 1000+ | ~50 |
| Director General | National leader of PN | Minister of Public Security | Entire force | 30,000+ | 1 |

National Border Service
| Rank | Job | Commanded By | Commands | Squad Size | Estimated Personnel |
|---|---|---|---|---|---|
| Soldado | Border patrol, jungle ops | Cabo / Sargento | None | N/A | 6,000+ |
| Cabo | Leads tactical fireteams | Sargento | Soldados | 3–6 | ~1,000 |
| Sargento | Leads squads, field control | Subteniente / Teniente | Cabos, Soldados | 6–10 | ~700 |
| Subteniente | Junior officer, platoon-level | Teniente / Capitán | Sargentos, squads | 10–20 | ~400 |
| Teniente | Platoon commander | Capitán | Platoons | 20–40 | ~250 |
| Capitán | Company-level commander | Mayor | Tenientes, Companies | 40–100 | ~120 |
| Mayor | Regional field commander | Comisionado | Capitanes | 100–200 | ~60 |
| Comisionado | Operational zone or province-wide command | Director General | Major commands | 500–1000+ | ~30 |
| Director General | National leader of SENAFRONT | Minister of Public Security | Entire service | 10,000+ | 1 |

National Aeronaval Service
| Rank | Job | Commanded By | Commands | Squad Size | Estimated Personnel |
|---|---|---|---|---|---|
| Marinero / Aerotécnico | Naval/aircraft crew, patrol, support ops | Cabo / Sargento | None | N/A | 4,000+ |
| Cabo | Leads air/naval teams | Sargento | Marineros | 3–5 | ~700 |
| Sargento | Manages boat or air teams | Subteniente / Teniente | Cabos, specialists | 5–10 | ~400 |
| Subteniente | Junior officer, unit commander | Teniente / Capitán de Corbeta | Crews, patrol teams | 10–20 | ~300 |
| Teniente | Boat or aircraft commander | Capitán de Corbeta | Subtenientes, crews | 20–40 | ~200 |
| Capitán de Corbeta | Coastal command, mid-level ops | Capitán de Fragata | Multiple crews or boats | 40–100 | ~100 |
