= José María Pinilla Fábrega =

President of Panama (1919–1979)

José María Pinilla

President of Panama
- In office 11 October 1968 – 18 December 1969 Serving with Bolívar Urrutia Parrilla
- Military Leader: Omar Torrijos
- Preceded by: Arnulfo Arias
- Succeeded by: Demetrio B. Lakas

Personal details
- Born: 28 November 1919 Panama
- Died: 10 August 1979 (aged 59) Panama
- Profession: Military

José María Pinilla Fábrega (November 28, 1919 – August 10, 1979) was Chairman of the Provisional Junta of Panama from October 11, 1968 to December 18, 1969.

Political offices
Preceded by Arnulfo Arias	President of Panama; 1968–1969	Succeeded by Demetrio B. Lakas
