= Boris Martínez =

Panamanian military officer

Boris Néstor Martínez Salazar was a Panamanian military officer of the former National Guard. He spearheaded the 1968 Panamanian coup d'état, which overthrew president-elect Arnulfo Arias Madrid, who had only been in office for eleven days.

A few months after the coup, on 23 February 1969, he was exiled to the United States by Omar Torrijos. He settled in Miami and worked for an aviation company.
