= Bolívar Urrutia Parrilla =

Bolivar Urrutia Parrilla

President of Panama
- In office 11 October 1968 – 18 December 1969 Serving with José María Pinilla
- Military Leader: Omar Torrijos
- Preceded by: Arnulfo Arias
- Succeeded by: Demetrio B. Lakas

Personal details
- Born: 1 December 1918 Las Tablas, Panama
- Died: 2 June 2005 (aged 86) Panama

Colonel Bolívar Urrutia Parrilla (1 December 1918 – 2 June 2005) was a Panamanian soldier and former President of Panama along with José María Pinilla from 1968 to 1969.

== Biography ==
Urrutia was a Panamanian soldier who commanded, alongside José María Pinilla, the military junta which overthrew elect president Arnulfo Arias on October 11, 1968. After the coup d'état, Urrutia and Pinilla took on together the charge of President of Panama. They governed together until the military junta was replaced by a civil junta on December 16, 1969, with president Demetrio Basilio Lakas. He died on June 2, 2005, at the age of 86.

Political offices
Preceded by Arnulfo Arias	President of Panama; 1968–1969	Succeeded by Demetrio B. Lakas
