= Omar Torrijos =

Military leader of Panama from 1968 to 1981

Maximum Leader of the Panamanian Revolution Omar Torrijos
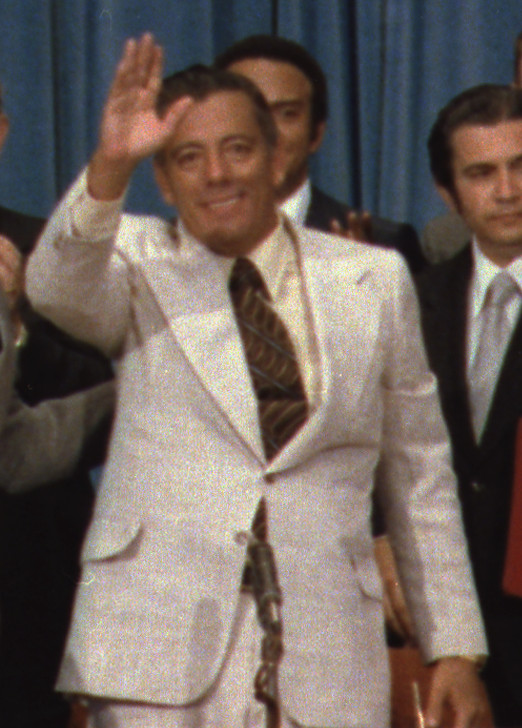
- Torrijos in 1978

Military Leader of Panama
- In office 11 October 1968 – 31 July 1981
- President: José María Pinilla; Bolívar Urrutia Parrilla; Demetrio B. Lakas; Arístides Royo
- Preceded by: Arnulfo Arias (as President of Panama)
- Succeeded by: Florencio Flores Aguilar

Personal details
- Born: Omar Efraín Torrijos Herrera; February 13, 1929 Santiago, Panama
- Died: July 31, 1981 (aged 52) near Penonomé, Panama
- Resting place: Torrijos Mausoleum; Amador, Panama City, Panama
- Party: Democratic Revolutionary Party (1979–1981)
- Spouse: Raquel Pauzner de Torrijos
- Children: 6, including: Martín Torrijos
- Occupation: Military officer and politician
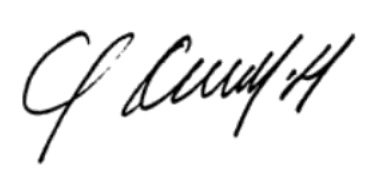
- Signature

Military service
- Allegiance: Panama
- Branch/service: National Guard of Panama
- Years of service: 1950–1981
- Rank: Brigadier General

Omar Efraín Torrijos Herrera (February 13, 1929 – July 31, 1981) was a Panamanian military officer, politician, and revolutionary who was the military leader of Panama, as well as the Commander of the Panamanian National Guard from 1968 to his death in 1981. Torrijos was never officially the president of Panama, but instead held self-imposed and all-encompassing titles, including "Maximum Leader of the Panamanian Revolution" (Spanish: "Líder Máximo de la Revolución Panameña"). Torrijos took power in a coup d'état and instituted a number of social reforms.

Torrijos is best known for negotiating the 1977 Torrijos–Carter Treaties that eventually gave Panama full sovereignty over the Panama Canal. The two treaties guaranteed that Panama would gain control of the Panama Canal after 1999, ending the control of the canal that the U.S. had exercised since 1903. On December 31, 1999, the final phase of the treaty, the US relinquished control of the Panama Canal and all areas in what had been the Panama Canal Zone.

His son Martín Torrijos was president from 2004 to 2009.

== Background ==
Omar Efraín Torrijos Herrera was born on February 13, 1929, in Santiago in the province of Veraguas, the sixth of twelve children. His parents were both employed as teachers. His Panamanian mother was Joaquina Herrera Gordillo, and his father, José Maria Torrijos Rada, was originally from Colombia. He was educated at the local Juan Demóstenes Arosemena School and, at eighteen, won a scholarship to the military academy in San Salvador. He graduated with a commission as a second lieutenant. He joined the Panamanian army, the National Guard (Guardia Nacional), in 1952. He was promoted to captain in 1956 then to major in 1960. He took a cadet course at the School of the Americas in 1965. He became the Executive Secretary of the National Guard in 1966.

== Career ==
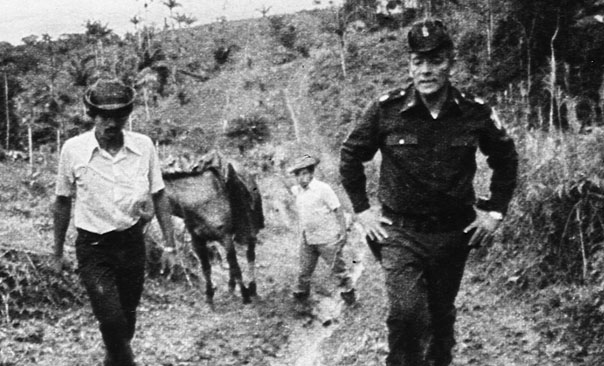
Omar Torrijos (right) with farmers in the Panamanian countryside. The Torrijos government was well known for its policies of land redistribution.

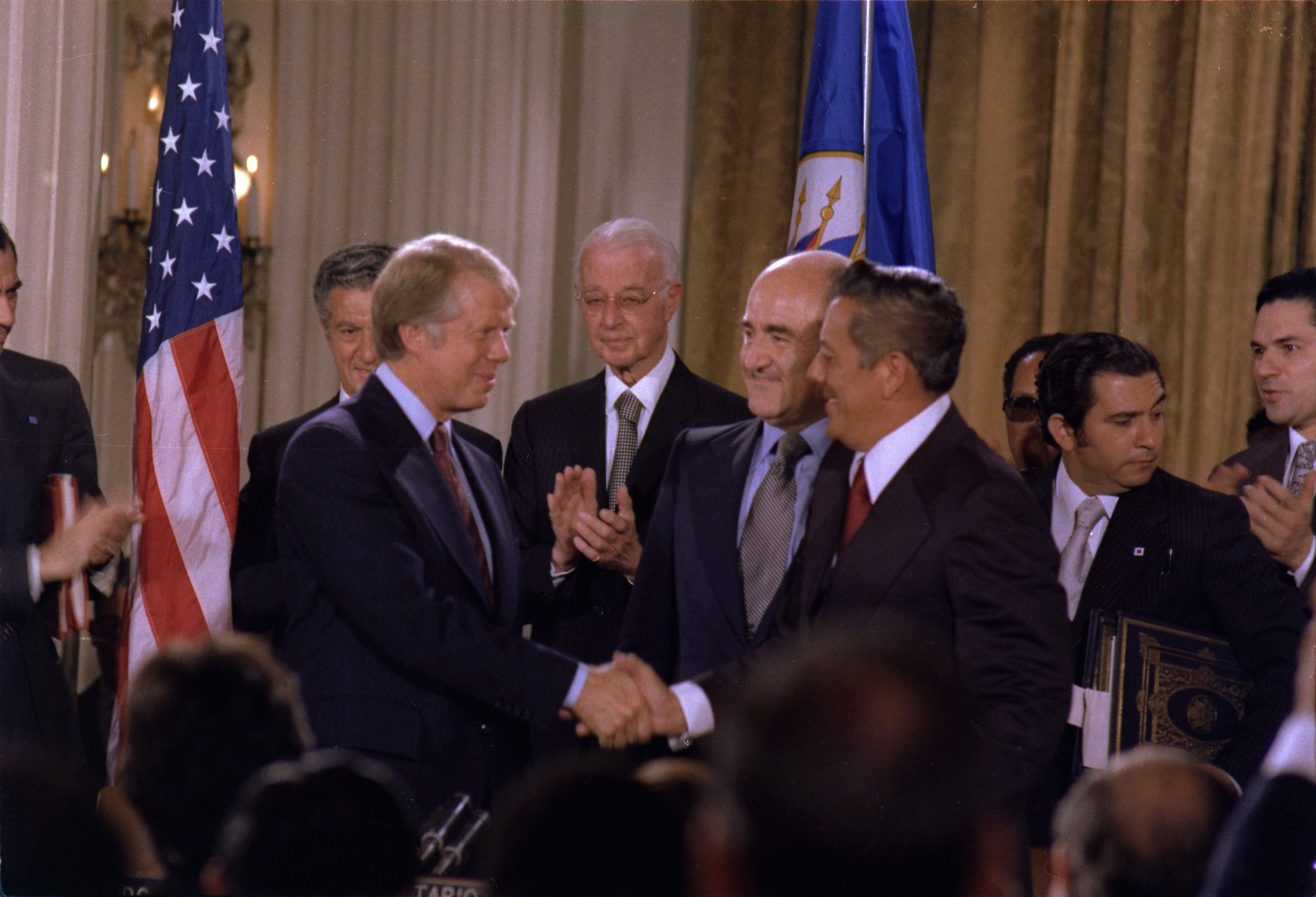
President Carter shakes hands with General Torrijos of Panama after signing the Panama Canal Treaty.

He had reached the rank of lieutenant colonel by 1966. Due to accusations of his involvement in election frauds, Torrijos was ordered to El Salvador in 1968 as a military attaché. It was during this year that his close friend in the Guardia, Major Boris Martínez and Colonel Jose Humberto Ramos (godfather of his son Omar) initiated a meditated and successful coup d'état against the recently elected president of Panama, Arnulfo Arias, after almost eleven days in office.

Having received news of the coup while in the Canal Zone, Torrijos and a few officers including Demetrio Lakas sought to re-establish some form of civilian rule, including an attempt to install Arnulfo's vice-president, Raúl Arango, as the new president, much to Martínez's dismay. Although a two-man junta was appointed, Martinez and Torrijos were the true leaders from the beginning. Torrijos was promoted to full colonel and named commandant of the National Guard. They barred all political activity and shut down the legislature. They also seized control of three newspapers owned by Arias's brother, Harmodio and blackmailed the owners of the country's oldest newspaper, La Estrella de Panamá, into becoming a government mouthpiece. With enough opposition against Martinez including from the United States, Torrijos ousted and exiled Martinez and Ramos to Miami on February 23, 1969, nearly four months after the initial coup. He then promoted himself to brigadier general.

For him, the overthrown government "was a marriage between the armed forces, the oligarchy and the bad priests;” the soldier carried his rifle to silence the people and forbid "the scoundrel" to disrespect the ruling class. Explaining that his revolution acts "for the poor, not for the owners", he had a new Constitution, an agrarian reform, and a Labour Code adopted and recognized the workers' and peasants' unions.

Torrijos promoted land reform, education, and social welfare programs in an effort to reduce inequality and strengthen Panama’s sovereignty. His government's most popular measure was the redistribution of agricultural land. The reforms were accompanied by a major public works programme. He also opposed North American multinationals, redistributing 180,000 hectares of uncultivated land. In February 1974, following OPEC's model for oil, he attempted to form the Union of Banana Exporting Countries with other Central American States to respond to the influence of these multinationals, but did not obtain their support. Its policy promoted the emergence of a middle class and the representation of indigenous communities.

In 1972, his government held an election of an Assembly of Community Representatives. The new assembly approved a new Constitution and elected Demetrio Lakas as president. Torrijos was the actual head of government, with near-absolute powers for six years.

Torrijos was regarded by his supporters as the first Panamanian leader to represent the majority population of Panama, which is poor, Spanish-speaking, and of mixed heritage – as opposed to the stereotypically white-skinned social elite, often referred to as rabiblancos ("white-tails", or more recently, yeyé(s)), who had long (and still do, to a lesser extent) dominated the commerce and political life of Panama. He opened many schools and created new job opportunities for those less fortunate. Some say he even spent his weekends giving a thousand dollars to random people and charities. Torrijos instituted a range of social and economic reforms to improve the land lots of the poor, and redistributed agricultural land. He prosecuted the richest and most powerful families in the country, and in turn favored his political allies, which enabled them to amass their own fortunes at the expense of the Panamanian treasury. His reforms were accompanied by an ambitious public works program, financed by foreign banks.

In international politics, Torrijos supported Chilean President Salvador Allende and welcomed refugees after the 1973 coup d'état. He helped the Sandinista guerrillas in Nicaragua and other rebel forces in El Salvador, Guatemala, and renewed diplomatic relations with Cuba.

In 1978, he stepped down as head of the government but remained de facto ruler of the country while another one of his followers, Arístides Royo, was a figurehead president. He also restored some civil liberties; U.S. President Jimmy Carter had told him that the Senate would never approve the Canal treaties unless Torrijos made some effort to liberalize his rule.

=== Panama Canal ===
An admirer of Yugoslav leader Josip Broz Tito and inspired by Gamal Abdel Nasser's nationalization of the Suez Canal, he embarked on a fight against the United States to gain Panama's sovereignty. In 1973, in the absence of progress in negotiations with the United States, he tried to involve the UN: "We have never been, are not and will never be an associated state, colony or protectorate, and we do not intend to add a star to the United States flag". The US vetoed the adopted resolution.

Torrijos negotiated the Torrijos–Carter Treaties over the Panama Canal, signed on September 7, 1977. These treaties passed United States sovereignty over the canal zone to Panama, with a gradual increase in Panamanian control over it, leading to complete control on December 31, 1999. The United States, however, retained the permanent right to protect what it called the 'neutrality' of the canal, allowing U.S. administration of the canal as well as military intervention through the now-legalized U.S. bases in Panama. These aspects of the treaty fell short of nationalistic goals and the ratification ceremony at Fort Clayton was somewhat of an embarrassment for Torrijos. He was noticeably drunk during the ceremony; his speech was badly slurred and he had to brace himself against the podium to keep from falling.

=== Political transition ===
With pressure from the Carter administration as well as from economic depression, Torrijos sought to appease public distress and defuse opposition from labor unions as well as influential oligarchs. He reintroduced the traditional parties by modifying the 1972 constitution and set elections for 1984. During this time, in 1979, Torrijos organized the Democratic Revolutionary Party (PRD) which loosely linked to Socialist International ideals and represented a melange of social classes, namely the internationally affiliated bourgeoisie. Due to the incoherent nature of this organization, Torrijos was the pivotal figure in maintaining a stable vision between the left and right tendencies within it. His death in 1981, before the transition could be completed, caused a political crisis in the country which led to Manuel Noriega coming to power as military ruler.

== Personal life ==
Omar Torrijos has been generally regarded as a personable man though varying accounts appear contradictory. He married Raquel Pauzner in 1954 and had three children. Having spent most of his time with campesinos during the weekends, he had little time to spare for his children. He had three primary residences: a beach house at Farallón, a house at Coclesito, and a house on Fiftieth Street in Panama City, the last of which his family lived a few blocks from. According to first-hand accounts by Torrijos's friend and guest, Graham Greene, Torrijos had a mistress who was studying sociology in the U.S.

Torrijos has been described as a heavy drinker who enjoyed Havana cigars and beautiful women. During a meeting with American Ambassador Brandon Grove in December 1969, Torrijos challenged him to a game of pinball and later said, “I’m not an intellectual but a man of horse sense, like a farmer”. Torrijos relished in the opinions others had of his colleagues and acquaintances especially if they coincided with his own. He has been described as humble and respectful as he listened to the plights of middle and lower-class people.

== Death ==
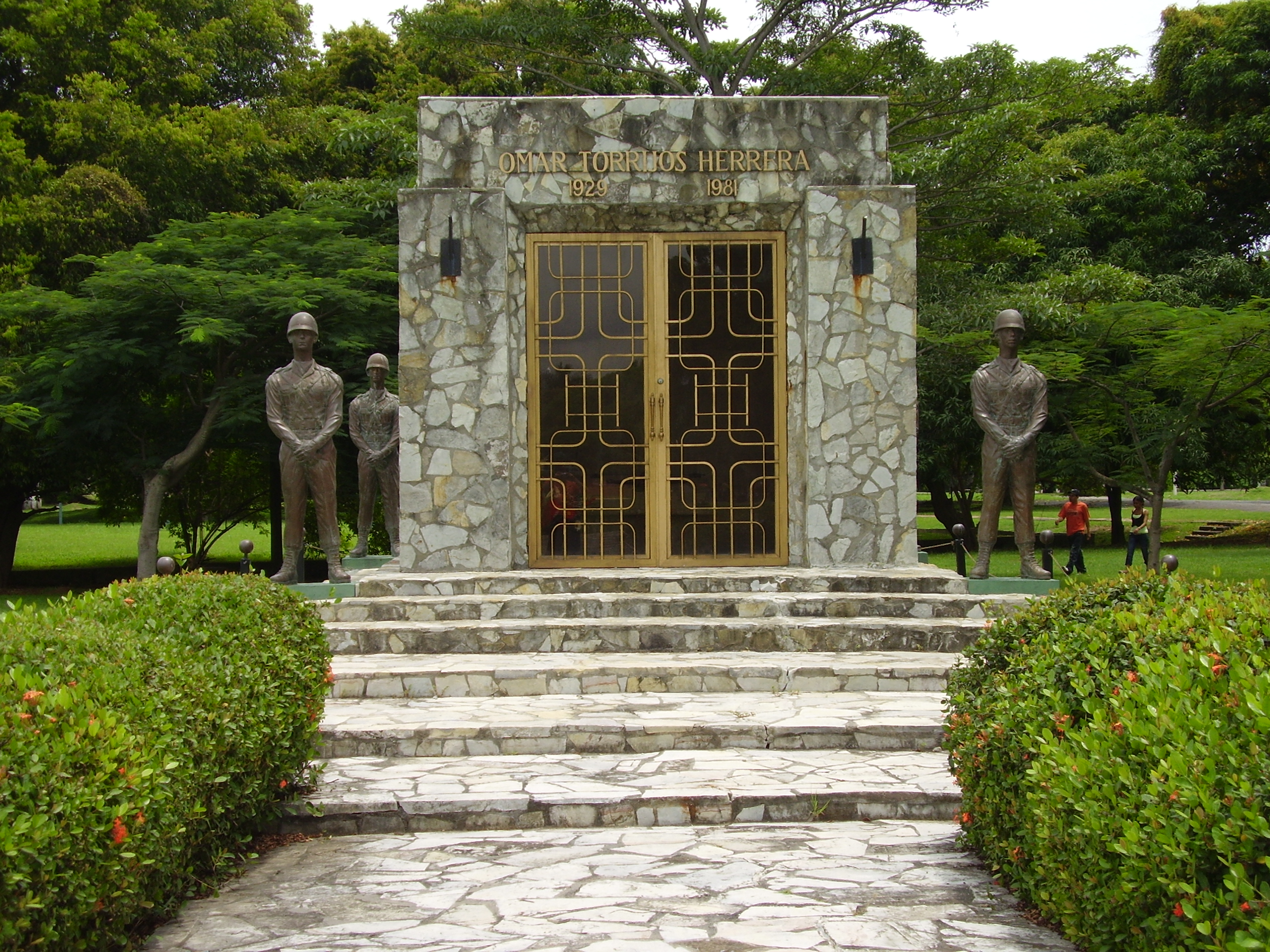
Omar Torrijos Mausoleum in Amador, Panama City, in the former Canal Zone

Torrijos died at the age of 52 when his aircraft, a de Havilland Canada DHC-6 Twin Otter of the Panamanian Air Force, crashed at Cerro Marta, in Coclesito, near Penonomé, Panama on July 31, 1981. The aircraft disappeared from radar during light weather, but due to the limited nature of Panama's radar coverage at the time, the plane was not reported missing for nearly a day. The crash site was located several days later, and the body of Torrijos was recovered by a Special Forces team in the first few days of August. Four aides and two pilots also died in the crash. His death caused national mourning around the country, especially in poor areas. Following a large state funeral, Torrijos's body was briefly buried in a cemetery in Casco Viejo (the Old City of Panama), before being moved to a mausoleum in the former Canal Zone on Fort Amador near Panama City. He was succeeded as commander of the National Guard and de facto leader of Panama by Florencio Flores (de jure was a military leader; however, de facto never exercised power as one,) who later gave way to Rubén Darío Paredes. The crash site is now a national park and his house in Coclesito is now a museum.

Torrijos's death generated charges and speculation that he was the victim of an assassination plot. For instance, in pre-trial hearings in Miami in May 1991, Manuel Noriega's attorney, Frank Rubino, was quoted as saying "General Noriega has in his possession documents showing attempts to assassinate General Noriega and Mr. Torrijos by agencies of the United States." No such documents have as yet been produced. In 1981, Soviet news agency TASS also claimed that the U.S. had caused Torrijos's death.

Former Noriega chief of staff Colonel Roberto Diaz, a cousin of Torrijos, as recently as 2013 has several times accused the United States and Noriega of involvement in Torrijos's death and called for investigations.

== Foreign honours ==
- Belize:
  - Recipient of the Order of Belize (2006, awarded posthumously)
- Cuba:
  - Recipient of the Order of José Martí (1976)
- Peru:
  - Grand Cross of the Order of the Sun of Peru (1974)
- Spain:
  - Collar of the Order of Civil Merit (1977)
- Yugoslavia
  - Order of the Yugoslav Great Star (1976)

== See also ==
- Confessions of an Economic Hit Man
- José de Jesús Martínez
- List of unsolved deaths
- Tocumen International Airport
- Getting To Know The General: The Story of an Involvement
- Military dictatorship in Panama

Military offices
Preceded by New Title	Military Leader of Panama; 1968–1981	Succeeded by Florencio Flores de jure
Preceded by New Title	Military Leader of Panama; 1968–1981	Succeeded by Rubén Darío Paredes de facto
Party political offices
Preceded by Position established	Maximum Leader of the Panamanian Revolution; 1968–1981	Succeeded by Position abolished
