= Demetrio B. Lakas =

President of Panama (1925–1999)

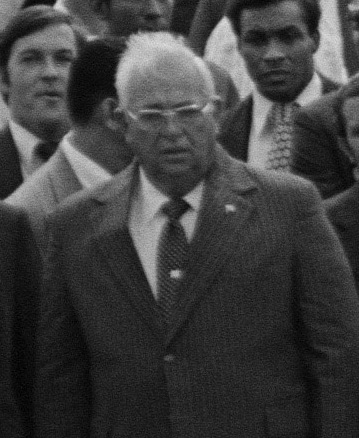

26th President of Panama
- In office December 19, 1969 – October 11, 1978
- Military Leader: Omar Torrijos
- Vice President: Arturo Sucre; Gerardo González
- Preceded by: José María Pinilla; Bolívar Urrutia Parrilla
- Succeeded by: Arístides Royo

Personal details
- Born: Demetrio Basilio Lakas Bahas; August 29, 1925 Colón, Panama
- Died: November 2, 1999 (aged 74) Panama City, Panama
- Spouse: Elizabeth Fannia Roger de Lakas (m. 1959)
- Children: 1 daughter, 2 sons
- Occupation: Engineer
- 1 Lakas began his term in office as the Chairmen of the Provisional Junta of Government. 2 Fábrega was the military Chairmen of the Provisional Junta of Government.

Demetrio Basilio Lakas Bahas (August 29, 1925 – November 2, 1999) was the 27th President of Panama from December 19, 1969 to October 11, 1978.

== Early life and education ==
The son of Greek immigrants, Lakas was born in Colón. Following his education in local schools, he graduated from Texas Tech University in 1953 and was honored as a distinguished alumnus in 1970.

Lakas was nicknamed "Jimmy the Greek" due to his origin.

== Presidency ==
Lakas was popular among his fellow businessmen. After General Omar Torrijos survived a military coup against him on 16 December 1969, Torrijos named him president of the provisional government. Lakas' presidency was primarily during rule of military officer Omar Torrijos, and was marked by media censorship and suppression of opposition movements. He also negotiated the 1977 Torrijos–Carter Treaty that transferred control of the Panama Canal from the US to Panama.

== Death ==
He died on 2 November 1999 at the age of 74 in Panama City after succumbing to a heart disease.

Political offices
Preceded by José María Pinilla	President of Panama; 1969–1978	Succeeded by Arístides Royo
