= Noriega: God's Favorite =

2000 American television film

- Screenplay by: Lawrence Wright
- Directed by: Roger Spottiswoode
- Starring: Bob Hoskins
- Country of origin: United States
- Original language: English

Production
- Producers: Nancy Hardin, Lope V. Juban Jr., J. Boyce Harman Jr., Arnon Milchan, Roger Spottiswoode, Tom Todoroff, Nick Wechsler, Lawrence Wright
- Cinematography: Pierre Mignot
- Editor: Mark Conte
- Running time: 120 minutes
- Production companies: Industry Entertainment; Regency Enterprises; Showtime Networks

Original release
- Release: March 4, 2000

Noriega: God's Favorite is a 2000 biographical made-for-television film starring Bob Hoskins as Panamanian dictator Manuel Noriega.

== Synopsis ==
The film depicts the rise of general Manuel Antonio Noriega from utter poverty to military dictator of Panama. It chronicles his involvement with drug cartels as well as the U.S. government during the Iran–Contra affair.

== Cast ==
- Bob Hoskins as Manuel Noriega
- Jeffrey DeMunn as Nuncio
- Rosa Blasi as Vicky Amador
- Luis Avalos as President Nicky Barletta
- Denise Blasor as Felicidad Noriega
- Nestor Carbonell as Major Moisés Giroldi
- Tony Plana as Colonel Diaz-Herrera
- Sabi Dior as Irwin
- John Verea as Father Jorge
- Richard Masur as Mark
- David Marshall Grant as Drug dealer
- Michael Sorich as Fidel Castro
- Jorge Luis Abreu as Witch doctor
- Edward Edwards as Oliver North
- Susan Africa as Adela Giroldi
- Ina Alegre as Prostitute
- Ivan Allen as Newscaster
- Ed Aquino as Giroldi's Man
- Ed Bouffard as Newscaster
- Janice Brillotes as Yacht woman
- Jennifer Cain as Swiss receptionist
- Ivo Cutzarida as Hugo Spadafora
- Subas Herrero as Gabriel Arias
- Tonyo Meléndez as Pepe Velasquez
- Frank Roman as Cesar Rodriguez
- Bart Suretsky as Kiki Pretelet
- Veronica Veron as Chaquita

== Reception ==
Reviews were generally positive. On the review aggregator website Rotten Tomatoes, 50% of 6 critics' reviews are positive. Anita Gates of The New York Times wrote, "If I had seen Bob Hoskins play Manuel Antonio Noriega earlier, I would have paid a lot more attention to the American invasion of Panama." Howard Rosenberg of the Los Angeles Times wrote that Bob Hoskins "captures best the contradictions of a man at once endearing and despicable." One reviewer wrote that "the hair-raising career of deposed Panamanian dictator Manuel Noriega surpassed even the surreal creations of many Latin American novelists, thus making him a natural movie subject". Hoskins was nominated for a Satellite Award for his role in the film.
