= Manuel Noriega =

Military dictator of Panama from 1983 to 1989

General Manuel Noriega
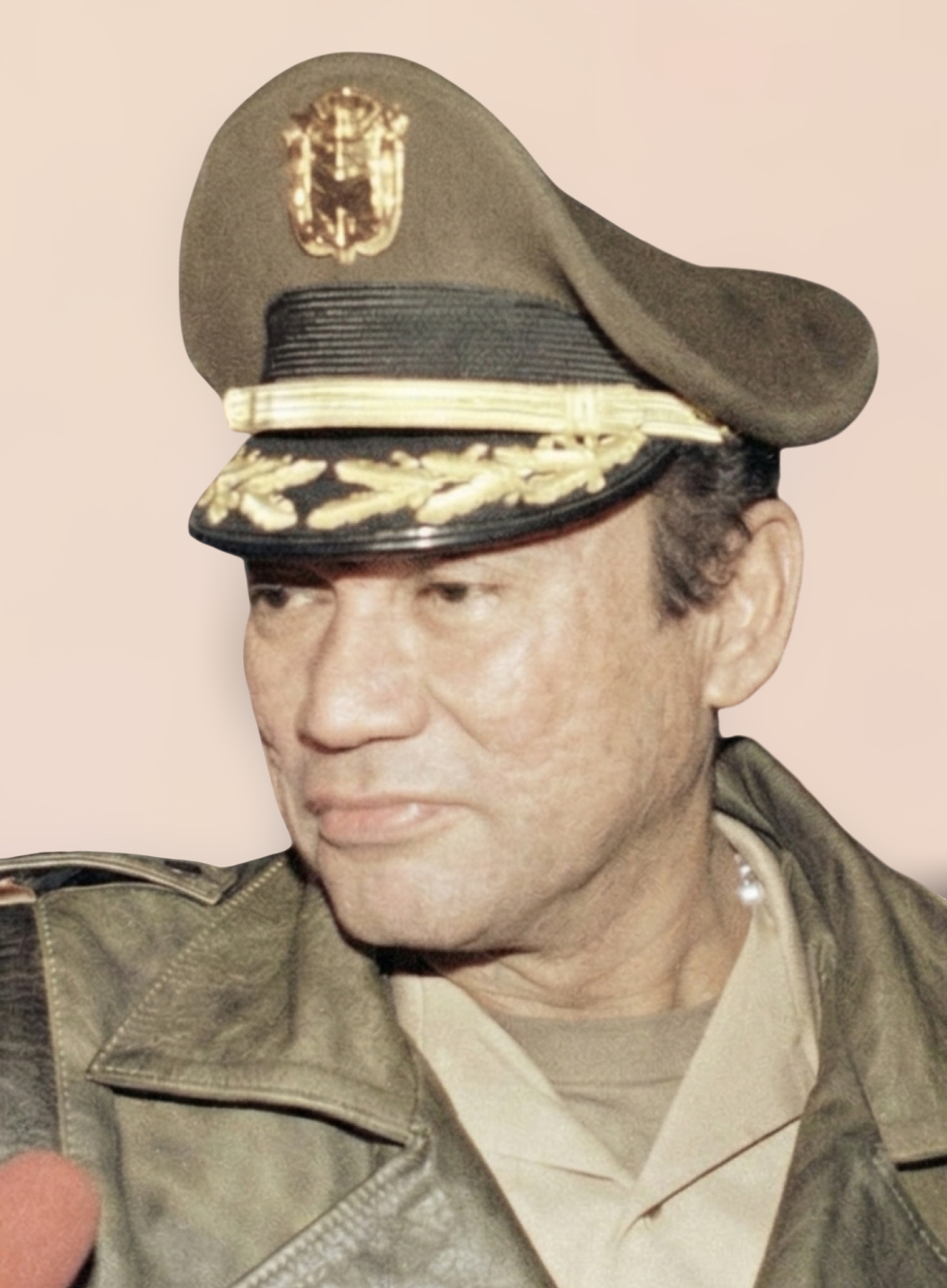
- Noriega in 1988

Military Leader of Panama
- In office August 12, 1983 – December 20, 1989
- President: Ricardo de la Espriella; Jorge Illueca; Nicolás Ardito Barletta; Eric Arturo Delvalle; Manuel Solís Palma; Francisco Rodríguez
- Preceded by: Rubén Darío Paredes
- Succeeded by: Guillermo Endara (as President of Panama)

Personal details
- Born: Manuel Noriega Moreno; February 11, 1934 (Note: The year of Noriega's birth is generally given as 1934, but is a matter of uncertainty. It has been variously recorded as 1934, 1936, and 1938. Noriega himself provided varying dates of birth.) Panama City, Panama
- Died: May 29, 2017 (aged 83) Panama City, Panama
- Spouse: Felicidad Sieiro de Noriega (m. 1960)
- Children: 3
- Education: Chorrillos Military School; School of the Americas
- Criminal information
- Convictions: Crimes against humanity; Money laundering; Murder
- Penalty: 40 years imprisonment (USA); 7 years imprisonment (FRA); 60 years imprisonment (PAN)

Details
- Date apprehended: January 3, 1990
- Imprisoned at: Federal Correctional Institution, Miami (USA); La Santé Prison (FRA); El Renacer (PAN)

Military service
- Allegiance: Panama
- Branch/service: Panama Defense Forces
- Years of service: 1962–1990
- Rank: General
- Commands: Panama Defense Forces
- Battles/wars: Insurgency in Chiriquí; Invasion of Panama

Manuel Antonio Noriega Moreno (/mɑːnˈwɛl ˌnɔːriˈeɪɡə/ mahn-WEL NOR-ee-AY-gə; Spanish: [maˈnwel noˈɾjeɣa]; February 11, 1934 – May 29, 2017) was a Panamanian military officer and dictator who was the de facto ruler of Panama from 1983 to 1989. He never officially served as president of Panama, instead ruling as an unelected military dictator through puppet presidents. Amassing a personal fortune through drug trafficking operations by the Panamanian military, Noriega had longstanding ties with American intelligence agencies before the United States invasion of Panama removed him from power.

Born in Panama City to a poor pardo family, Noriega studied at the Chorrillos Military School in Lima and at the School of the Americas. He became an officer in the Panamanian army, and rose through the ranks in alliance with Omar Torrijos. In 1968, Torrijos overthrew President Arnulfo Arias in a coup. Noriega became chief of military intelligence in Torrijos's government and, after Torrijos's death in 1981, consolidated power to become Panama's de facto ruler in 1983. Beginning in the 1950s, Noriega worked with U.S. intelligence agencies, and became one of the Central Intelligence Agency's most valued intelligence sources. He also served as a conduit for illicit weapons, military equipment, and cash destined for U.S.-backed forces throughout Latin America.

Noriega's relationship with the U.S. deteriorated in the late 1980s after the murder of Hugo Spadafora and the forced resignation of President Nicolás Ardito Barletta. Eventually, his relationship with intelligence agencies in other countries came to light, and his involvement in drug trafficking was investigated further. In 1988, Noriega was indicted by federal grand juries in Miami and Tampa, Florida, on charges of racketeering, drug smuggling, and money laundering. The U.S. launched an invasion of Panama following failed negotiations seeking his resignation and Noriega's annulment of the 1989 Panamanian general election. Noriega was captured and flown to the U.S., where he was tried on the Miami indictment, convicted on most of the charges, and sentenced to 40 years in prison, ultimately serving 17 years after a reduction in his sentence for good behavior. Noriega was extradited to France in 2010, where he was convicted and sentenced to seven years of imprisonment for money laundering. In 2011, France extradited him to Panama, where he was incarcerated for crimes committed during his rule for which he had been tried and convicted in absentia in the 1990s. Diagnosed with a brain tumor in March 2017, Noriega suffered complications during surgery, and died two months later.

Noriega's dictatorship was marked by repression of the media, an expansion of the military, and the persecution of political opponents, effectively controlling the outcomes of any elections. He relied upon military nationalism to maintain his support, and did not espouse a specific social or economic ideology. Noriega was known for his complicated relationship with the U.S., and was described as being its ally and adversary simultaneously.

== Early life and family ==
Manuel Antonio Noriega Moreno was born in Panama City, into a relatively poor pardo, or triracial, family with Native Panamanian, African, and Spanish heritage. His date of birth is generally given as February 11, 1934, but is a matter of uncertainty. It has been variously recorded as that date in 1934, 1936, and 1938. Noriega himself provided differing dates of birth. He was born in the neighborhood of El Terraplen de San Felipe. Noriega's mother, who was not married to his father, has been described as a cook and a laundress, while his father, Ricaurte Noriega, was an accountant. His mother, whose family name was Moreno, died of tuberculosis when he was a child, and Noriega was brought up by a godmother in a one-room apartment in the slum area of Terraplén. Both of his parents were dead by the time he was five years old.

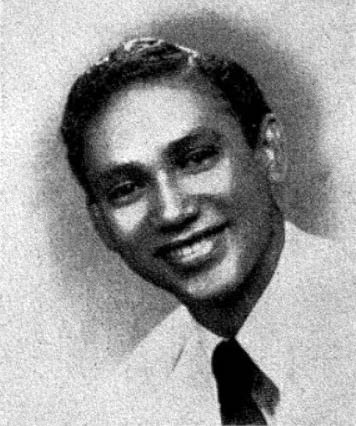
Noriega in an Instituto Nacional yearbook

Noriega was educated first at the Escuela República de México, and later at the Instituto Nacional, a well-regarded high school in Panama City that had produced a number of nationalist political leaders. He was described as an "oddly serious child," a bookish student always neatly dressed by his godmother. During his time in the Instituto Nacional he met his older half-brother Luis Carlos Noriega Hurtado, a socialist activist and also a student at the school: Manuel had not previously met his siblings. Manuel began living with Luis, who introduced him to politics, including recruiting him into the Socialist Party's youth wing. Luis Noriega would later direct Panama's electoral tribunal. During his time in the socialist youth group, Noriega took part in protests and authored articles criticizing the U.S. presence in Panama. He is reported to have begun his association with the U.S. intelligence services at this time, providing information about the activities of his comrades. A$10.70 payment in 1955 was the first he received from the U.S.

Noriega intended to become a doctor, but was unable to secure a place in the University of Panama's medical school. After graduating from the Instituto Nacional, Noriega won a scholarship to Chorrillos Military School in the Peruvian capital of Lima, with the help of Luis, who had by then received a position in the Panamanian embassy in Peru. Noriega began studying in Lima in 1958. While there, he made the acquaintance of Roberto Díaz Herrera, then studying at the Peruvian Police academy, who later became a close ally.

Noriega married Felicidad Sieiro in the late 1960s, and the couple had three daughters: Lorena; Sandra; and Thays. Sieiro had been a school teacher, and Noriega a member of the National Guard. Her family, of Basque heritage, was reported to have been unhappy with the marriage. Noriega was repeatedly unfaithful to his wife, who at one point expressed a desire for a divorce, though she changed her mind later.

== National Guard career ==
Noriega graduated from Chorrillos in 1962 with a specialization in engineering. He returned to Panama and joined the Panama National Guard. Posted to Colón, he was commissioned as a second lieutenant in September 1962. His commanding officer in Colón was Omar Torrijos, then a major in the National Guard. Torrijos became a patron and mentor to Noriega. In a 1962 incident Torrijos helped Noriega avoid legal trouble after a prostitute accused Noriega of beating and raping her. Soon after, Noriega's drinking and violence obliged Torrijos to confine him to his quarters for a month. Despite Noriega's problems, Torrijos maintained their relationship, ensuring they were always in the same command; he also brought Díaz Herrera into the same unit. Díaz Herrera and Noriega became both friends and rivals for Torrijos's favor.

In 1964 Noriega had been posted to the province of Chiriquí, where Torrijos and Díaz Herrera were stationed. At the time, Arnulfo Arias, a native of that province, was preparing to contest the 1968 Panamanian Presidential election. Arias was a member of the National Revolutionary Party that represented the Panameñista movement. The sitting president, Roberto Chiari, belonged to the Liberal Party, which ordered Torrijos to harass Arias's party members and weaken his election bid. Torrijos passed this task on to Noriega, whose men arrested a number of people. Several prisoners said that they had been tortured; others stated they had been raped in prison. The mistreatment of Arias' supporters sparked public outrage, and led to Noriega being suspended for ten days, an item of information that was picked up by the U.S. intelligence services. In 1966, Noriega was again involved in a violent incident, allegedly raping a 13-year-old girl and beating her brother. After this, Torrijos transferred Noriega to a remote posting.

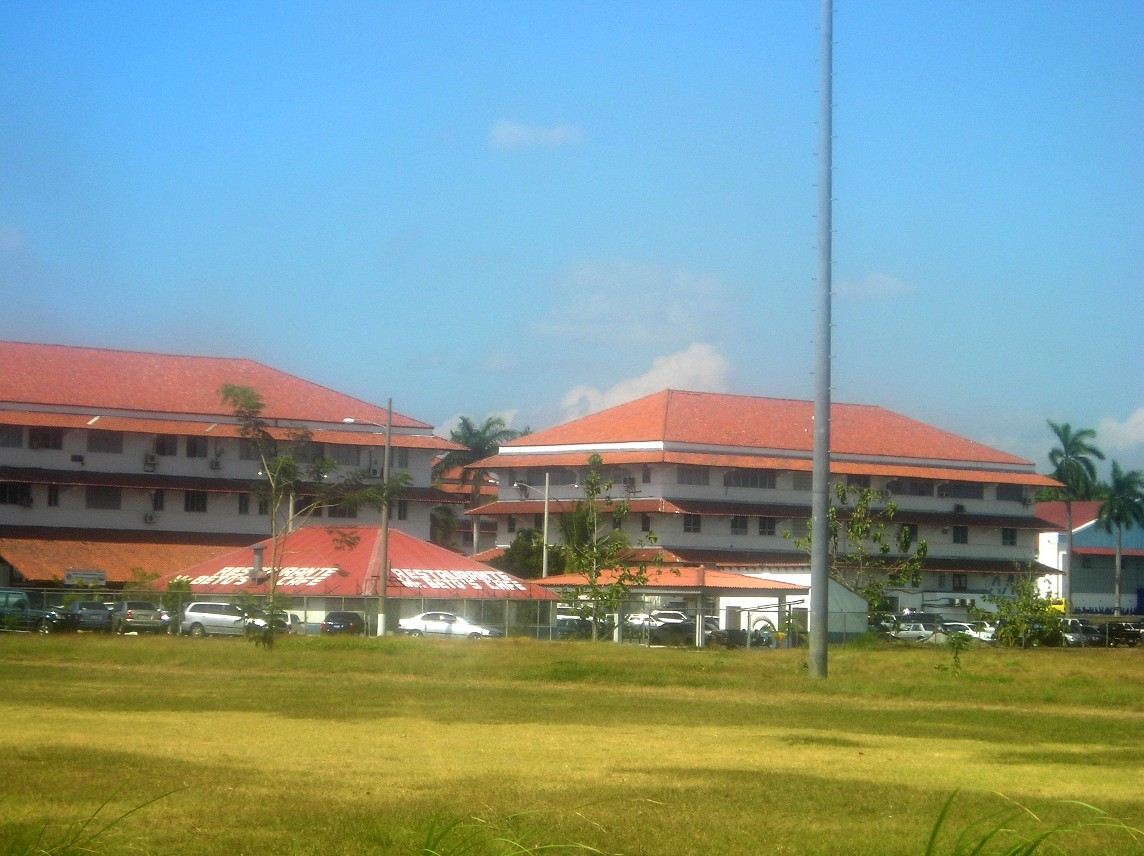
The School of the Americas (photographed in 2006), where Noriega took several courses

As a second lieutenant in 1966, Noriega spent many months taking courses at the School of the Americas. The school was located at the United States Army's Fort Gulick in the Panama Canal Zone. Journalist John Dinges has suggested that Torrijos sent Noriega to the school to help him "shape up" and live up to Torrijos's expectations. Despite performing poorly in his classes, he was promoted to the rank of first lieutenant in 1966, and Torrijos found him a job as an intelligence officer in the "North Zone" of the National Guard. Shortly afterward, he returned to the School of the Americas for more training. At the school, Noriega participated in courses on infantry operations, counterintelligence, intelligence, and jungle warfare. He also took a course in psychological operations at Fort Bragg in North Carolina.

Noriega's job required him to penetrate and disrupt the trade unions that had formed in the United Fruit Company's workforce, and he proved adept at this work. His new superior officer Boris Martínez was a fervent anti-communist, and enforced strict discipline on Noriega. Reports have suggested that he continued to pass intelligence to the U.S. during this period, about the plantation workers' activities. In 1967 the administration of U.S. President Lyndon B. Johnson concluded that Noriega would be a valuable asset, as he was a "rising star" in the Panamanian military. Later, as the de facto leader of Panama, Noriega maintained a close relationship with the School of the Americas, partly due to the school's presence in Panama. Officials from the Panamanian military were frequently given courses at the school free of charge. Noriega was proud of his relationship with the school, and wore its crest on his military uniform for the rest of his career.

== Rise to power ==
=== 1968 coup ===
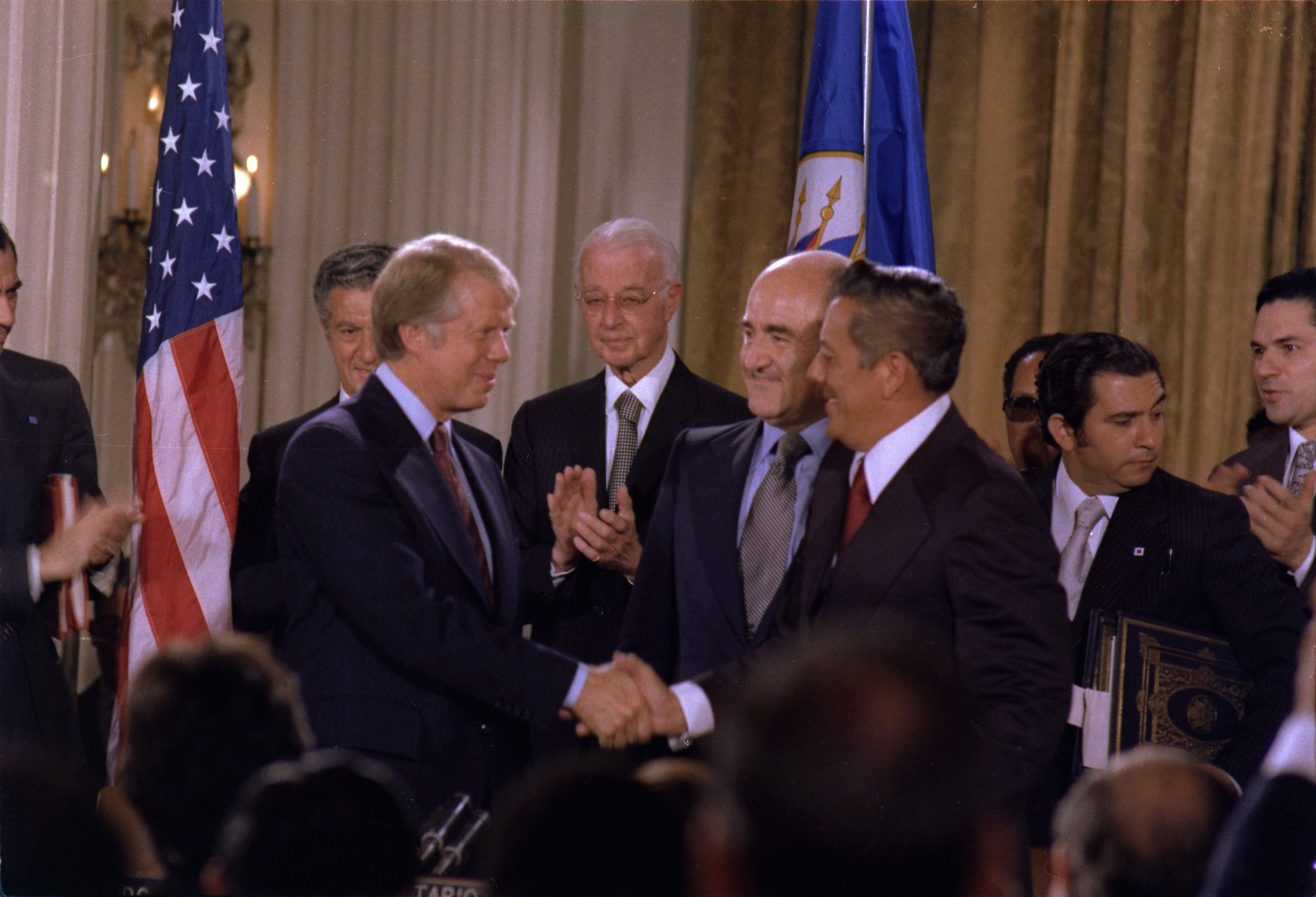
United States President Jimmy Carter shaking hands with General Omar Torrijos after signing the Panama Canal Treaty in 1977

Arias was elected president in 1968 following a populist campaign. Soon after taking office he launched a purge of the National Guard, sending much of its general staff into "diplomatic exile" or retirement. In response, Torrijos and a few other officers led a coup against him, ousting him after an eleven-day presidency. The coup was set in motion by Martínez, as the leader of the garrison at Chiriquí, and received the support of most military officers. A power struggle followed between the various forces involved in the coup, and chiefly between Torrijos and Martínez. Noriega was an important supporter of Torrijos during this conflict. In February 1969, Torrijos's men seized Martínez and exiled him to Miami giving Torrijos control of the country.

At the end of 1969, Torrijos went to Mexico on holiday. A coup was launched in his absence, in which Noriega's loyalty allowed Torrijos to hang on to power, greatly enhancing Torrijos's image. Noriega was promoted to captain a month after the coup attempt: just 18 months later, in August 1970, Torrijos promoted him to the position of lieutenant colonel and appointed him chief of military intelligence. According to Dinges, by this point Noriega had left his undisciplined past behind him. When Arias's supporters launched a guerrilla uprising in his home province, Noriega as the head of intelligence played an important role in putting it down within a year.

Torrijos retained power as a military ruler until 1981: during this time he negotiated the Torrijos–Carter Treaties with U.S. President Jimmy Carter, which ensured that control over the Panama Canal would pass to Panama in 1999. These treaties, as well as a new labor code that included maternity leave, collective bargaining rights, and bonus pay, made Torrijos popular in Panama despite the absence of democratic elections. Torrijos's relationship with Noriega was symbiotic; Torrijos provided the political acumen, while Noriega enforced his unpopular decisions with force, when necessary. Noriega would provide intelligence and carry out covert operations that were critical to Torrijos successfully negotiating the release of the Panama Canal from the U.S.

Upon seizing power in 1968, Torrijos's government had passed legislation favorable to foreign corporations, including banks in the U.S. The following years saw a large expansion in international business activity and the influx of foreign capital, thereby giving participating corporations a stake in the continued existence of the military government. The government used its access to foreign capital to borrow extensively, fueling a rapid expansion of the state bureaucracy that contributed to the military regime's stability. Panama's borrowing peaked in 1978 when the Panama Canal treaty was being negotiated, a time at which the Carter government was particularly supportive of the Torrijos regime. The Carter administration's interest in signing a new treaty led it to largely overlook the increasing militarization of the Panamanian government, and its involvement in drug-trafficking.

=== Head of intelligence ===
Noriega proved to be a very capable head of intelligence. During his tenure, he exiled 1,300 Panamanians whom he viewed as threats to the government. He also kept files on several officials within the military, the government, and the judiciary, allowing him to blackmail them later. Noriega also held the positions of head of the political police and head of immigration. His tenure was marked by intimidation and harassment of opposition parties and their leaders. He was described as doing much of Torrijos's "dirty work". For instance, Noriega ordered the death of Jesús Héctor Gallego Herrera, a priest whose work at an agricultural cooperative was seen as a threat by the government. Gallego's body is reported to have been thrown from a helicopter into the sea. He also made an effort during this period to portray Panama as a hub of enforcement against drug smuggling, possibly as a result of pressure from Torrijos.

By the early 1970s, American law enforcement officials had reports of Noriega's possible involvement with narcotics trafficking. No formal criminal investigations were begun, and no indictment was brought: according to Dinges, this was due to the potential diplomatic consequences. This evidence included the testimony of an arrested boat courier, and of a drug smuggler arrested in New York. Though Torrijos frequently promised the U.S. cooperation in dealing with drug smuggling, Noriega would have headed any effort at enforcement, and the U.S. began to see Noriega as an obstacle to combatting drug smuggling. Dinges writes that the U.S. government considered several options to move Noriega out of the drug trafficking business, including assassinating him, and linking him to a fictional plot against Torrijos. Though no assassination attempt was made, the other ploys may have been tried in the early 1970s, according to Dinges. Dinges wrote that beginning in 1972 the U.S. relaxed its efforts at trapping individuals involved with smuggling within the Panama government, possibly as a result of an agreement between Torrijos and U.S. President Richard Nixon.

During the early 1970s, Noriega's relationship with the U.S. intelligence services was regularized. The Central Intelligence Agency (CIA) placed him on its payroll in 1971, while he held his position as head of Panamanian intelligence; he had previously been paid by U.S. intelligence services on a case-by-case basis. Regular payments to him were stopped under the Carter administration, before being resumed and later stopped again under the administration of Ronald Reagan. The CIA valued him as an asset because he was willing to provide information about the Cuban government and later about the Sandinista government in Nicaragua. Noriega also served as the U.S. emissary to Cuba during negotiations following the Johnny Express incident in December 1971. Noriega was given access to CIA contingency funds, which he was supposed to use to improve his intelligence programs, but which he could spend with little accountability. The contingency funds were as high as US$100,000 in some years.

The CIA was aware that Noriega was selling intelligence on the U.S. to Cuba while he was working for it. Noriega also undertook a number of activities while nominally working for the CIA that served his own ends at the expense of the U.S. government. Journalist Frederick Kempe wrote in 1990 that Noriega had been linked to a series of bombings targeting the U.S. territory in the Panama Canal Zone during the prelude to the U.S. Presidential election in 1976 after the administration of U.S. President Gerald Ford stepped back from negotiations about the Panama Canal. The bombings highlighted to the U.S. government the difficulty of holding on to the Panama Canal Zone in the face of hostility within Panama. Kempe stated that the U.S. knew of Noriega's involvement in the bombings but decided to turn a blind eye toward them. In a December 1976 meeting with George H. W. Bush, then Director of Central Intelligence, Noriega flatly denied involvement, instead suggesting that the CIA was responsible.

During negotiations for the Panama Canal treaties, the U.S. government ordered its military intelligence to wiretap Panamanian officials. Noriega discovered this operation in early 1976, and instead of making it public, bribed the U.S. agents and bought the tapes in person; the incident came to be known as the "Singing Sergeants affair". Although some intelligence officials wanted Bush to prosecute the soldiers involved, he declined, because doing so would have exposed Noriega's role in the matter. The CIA did not report this incident to either the National Security Agency or the U.S. Justice Department. Noriega and Torrijos later used their knowledge of the U.S. wiretapping operations to tilt the Panama Canal negotiations in their favor. Noriega's drug-related activities came to the U.S. government's attention once again during the ratification process for the Panama Canal treaties, but were once again downplayed by the U.S. intelligence services to get the treaty ratified by the U.S. Senate.

=== Death of Torrijos ===
After the Nicaraguan Revolution was launched by the Sandinistas against U.S.-backed authoritarian ruler Anastasio Somoza Debayle in August 1978, Torrijos and Noriega initially supported the rebels, providing them with surplus National Guard equipment and allowing Panama to be used as a cover for arms shipments from Cuba to Nicaragua. Torrijos sought for himself the same aura of "democratic respectability" that the Sandinista rebels had in Nicaragua, and so abandoned the title of "Maximum Leader" he had taken in 1972, promising that elections would be held in 1984. Noriega also arranged for weapons purchased in the U.S. to be shipped to the Sandinista forces, a deal on which he made a profit. The U.S. discovered Noriega's role in supplying weapons, and though the episode proved embarrassing to the Carter administration in the U.S., no charges were brought against Noriega because the U.S. did not wish to anger a friendly government, and the issue was rendered moot by the Sandinista victory in 1979. After Somoza's overthrow, Noriega continued to smuggle weapons, selling them to leftist guerrillas fighting the U.S.-backed authoritarian government in El Salvador. After one of these shipments was captured, Torrijos, who had friends in the Salvadoran military government, reprimanded Noriega, though the shipments did not stop altogether.

Torrijos died in a plane crash on July 31, 1981. A later investigation by the aircraft manufacturer stated it was an accident; Noriega's authority over the government investigation led to speculation about his involvement. Florencio Flores Aguilar had inherited Torrijos's position, but true power lay with the trio of Noriega, Díaz Herrera, and Rubén Darío Paredes, who ranked just below him. Flores was removed in a quiet coup on March 3, 1982. By general agreement, Paredes was made leader until 1983, after which the military would work together to ensure his election as the president in the election scheduled for 1984. During this period Noriega became a full colonel and the National Guard's chief of staff, effectively the second-highest rank in the country. He reformed the National Guard as the Panama Defense Forces (PDF), and with the financial assistance of the U.S., expanded and modernized it. The quick promotions they received earned him the officer corps' loyalty. Among the steps he took to consolidate his control was to bring the various factions of the army together into the PDF. On August 12, 1983, in keeping with Noriega's earlier deal with Paredes, Paredes handed over his position to Noriega, newly appointed a general, with the understanding that Noriega would allow him to stand for president. However, Paredes never received the political support he expected, and after assuming his new position Noriega reneged on the deal, telling Paredes he could not contest the election. Noriega, now head of the PDF, thus became the de facto ruler of Panama.

== De facto ruler of Panama ==
Noriega preferred to remain behind the scenes, rather than become president, and to avoid the public scrutiny that came with the post. He did not have a particular social or economic ideology, and used military nationalism to unify his supporters. The Partido Revolucionario Democrático (Democratic Revolutionary Party, PRD), which had been established by Torrijos and had strong support among military families, was used by Noriega as a political front for the PDF. This party drew considerable support from low-income employees brought into the government bureaucracy by its expansion under Torrijos and Noriega. Noriega compelled the Panamanian National Assembly to pass Law 20 of 1983, which was supposedly aimed at protecting the Panama Canal from communists, and allowed a huge influx of U.S. weapons to the Panamanian military. The law also tripled the size of the military forces. Noriega's period in power saw significant capital flight from Panama; according to Kempe, this was at least in part because wealthy individuals worried that their wealth would be seized by Noriega's administration.

The military government of Torrijos had maintained its power in large part by extracting resources from Panama's expanding service sector, particularly its illicit portions. According to political scientist Steve Ropp, Torrijos was a "gifted politician with a genuine concern for improving the economic lot of the average Panamanian", but his individual talent had a relatively small role to play in preserving his government. When Noriega created the PDF in 1983, he brought into its control Panama's customs and immigration apparatus, as well as the country's whole transportation network. This expansion of the military's role occurred simultaneously with a large growth in the cocaine trade, as well as in markets for weapons in various military conflicts in Central America. The profits the military reaped from these activities gave Noriega's military regime considerable financial clout.

Noriega took control of most major newspapers by either buying a controlling stake in them or forcing them to shut down. The government also harassed, intimidated, or exiled individual journalists and editors. The newspaper La Prensa, which remained independent and was frequently critical of Noriega, had its staff intimidated and its offices damaged; eventually, it too was forced to close. In May 1984, Noriega allowed the first presidential elections in 16 years. Noriega and Díaz Herrera picked Nicolás Ardito Barletta Vallarino to be the PRD's candidate, with the intention of keeping him under close control. When the initial results showed Arias, who had the support of much of the opposition, on his way to a landslide victory, Noriega halted the count. After brazenly manipulating the results, the government announced that Barletta had won by a slim margin of 1,713 votes. Independent estimates suggested that Arias would have won by as many as 50,000 votes had the election been conducted fairly. More than 60,000 votes were not included in the final count. Noriega's rule became increasingly repressive, even as the U.S. government of Ronald Reagan began relying on him in its covert efforts to undermine Nicaragua's Sandinista government. The U.S. accepted Barletta's election, and signalled a willingness to cooperate with him, despite being aware of the flaws in the election process.

=== Relationship with the U.S. ===
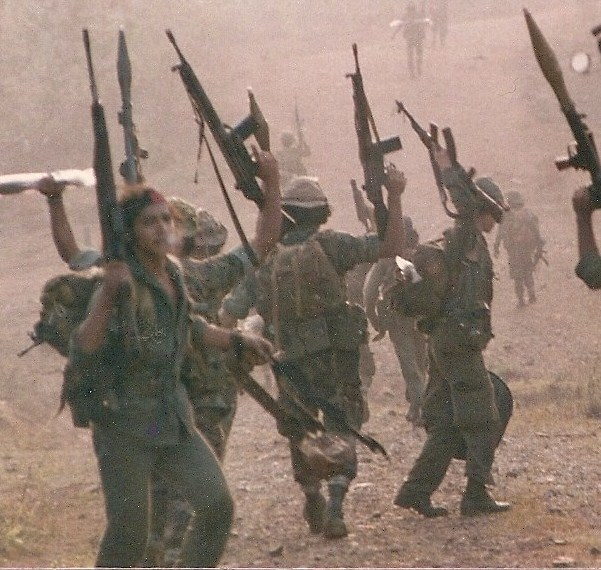
The Contras in Nicaragua, who received support from the U.S. via Noriega's administration

Between 1981 and 1987, the relationship between Noriega and the U.S. grew considerably. It was driven both by the U.S.'s pursuit of its security interests, and Noriega using these as an effective means of gaining favor. The emergence of internal conflicts in Nicaragua and El Salvador between 1979 and 1981 led the Reagan administration to look for allies in the region, including in Panama. Noriega acted as a conduit for U.S. support, including funds and weapons, to the Contra rebels in Nicaragua. He allowed the CIA to establish listening posts in Panama, and also helped the U.S.-backed Salvadoran government against the leftist Salvadoran insurgent Farabundo Martí National Liberation Front. U.S. spy ships used bases in Panama in their operations against the Nicaraguan government, and much of the intelligence gathered by these ships was processed in the U.S. bases in Panama. Noriega permitted these activities despite the Panama Canal treaties restricting the use of the U.S. bases to protecting the canal.

Bush, now U.S. vice president, met again with Noriega in December 1983 to discuss support for the Contras. Noriega had a working relationship with U.S. Marine Corps Lieutenant Colonel Oliver North by 1985. Noriega offered to assassinate or sabotage Sandinista leaders in return for North helping Noriega improve his image with the U.S. government. In June 1985 North met with Noriega in Panama and Noriega agreed to train Contra soldiers in Panama for an invasion of Nicaragua in 1986. In return for Panama's support for U.S. and Israeli efforts to supply the Contras with arms, the U.S. ignored Noriega's use of weapons-shipment networks to smuggle drugs into the U.S. Noriega was reported to have played a role in the Iran–Contra affair in the mid-1980s.

There are varying reports about how much Noriega was paid by United States sources. In early 1990, Noriega biographer Frederick Kempe reported that the United States gave Noriega or his intelligence services annual payments in the range of $110,000 in 1976 increasing to $185,000 to $200,000 when he came to power during the Reagan administration. Dinges said that he could find no one willing to confirm persistent reports that he received a $200,000 per year stipend from the CIA.

Prior to and during Noriega's trial, Noriega's lead attorney Frank A. Rubino claimed that Noriega had received $11 million in payments from the CIA. In January 1991, federal prosecutors filed a financial report indicating that Noriega had received a total of $322,000 from the United States Army and the CIA over a 31-year period from 1955 to 1986. They stated that the release of information was to rebut allegations from defense attorneys that Noriega had been paid "millions of dollars" from the CIA. These payments included a total of $76,039 as "gifts and incentives" from the CIA.

Despite Noriega's alliance with the U.S., he also maintained close relationships with bitter enemies of the U.S., including Cuba, Libya, and Nicaragua. A 1990 book discussing Noriega's administration stated that he had sold thousands of Panamanian passports to the Cuban government for use by its intelligence services. Cuba also obtained hardware imports from Panama that were restricted by the U.S. embargo, while it provided Panama with weapons and military advisers. Libya, as well as some U.S. allies, provided Noriega with funds when the U.S. was seeking to remove him from power.

=== Relationship with Japan ===
Japan was one of the few regimes to support Noriega at a time when he was under intense pressure from Reagan and found himself isolated. Japan was then Panama's second largest trading partner and had invested $8.8 billion in its economy. Japan had established Panama as the center of its expansion in Latin America. "There was a peak of relations with Japan in which they saw the importance of the Pacific in relation to the Atlantic and the need to expand the Canal," Noriega said in a 2017 interview. In June 1988, Tokyo gave its official backing to the Panamanian military government.

=== Drug and weapons operations ===
Panama's and Noriega's involvement in drug-trafficking grew considerably over the early 1980s, peaking in 1984. Intensifying conflicts in Colombia, El Salvador, Guatemala, and Nicaragua had led to the creation of covert transportation networks that Noriega used to transport drugs to the U.S., particularly cocaine. During this period, Colombia's Medellín Cartel was also seeking allies. Noriega became intimately involved with their drug trafficking and money-laundering operations, and received considerable sums as protection money, bribes, or shares of profits. In June 1986, investigative journalist Seymour Hersh recorded a U.S. White House official as saying that reducing Noriega's activities could greatly reduce international drug trafficking.

Hersh reported unnamed U.S. officials as saying that Noriega had amassed a personal fortune in European banks as a result of his illegal activities, as well as owning two homes in Panama and one in France. The wealth generated for the Panamanian military from drug-smuggling also helped stabilize the authoritarian government that it dominated. However, the military's control over wealth from illicit trade alienated the Panamanian business elite that had previously also benefited from such trade. Under Noriega, these profits were shared within the military less evenly than under Torrijos, eventually creating friction in the military leadership.

Many of the operations Noriega benefited from were run by associates such as Floyd Carlton and Cesar Rodríguez. Large sums from drug revenues were brought in from Miami and elsewhere to Panama for laundering, and Noriega received protection payments in these instances as well. American Steven Kalish also began a large scale business selling drugs, laundering money and selling hardware to the Panamanian military for considerable profits with Noriega's assistance. Dinges writes that at the time of the 1984 election, Kalish was preparing to ship a load of marijuana worth U.S. $1.4 million through Panama, for which Noriega had agreed to provide false Panamanian customs stamps; Noriega was to be paid $1 million for this exercise.

Beginning in 1984, Noriega appeared to reduce the scale of his operations, and even ordered a raid against a cocaine factory in the interior of Panama, a raid which he then emphasized as evidence of his cooperation with the U.S. in their fight against drugs. He also ordered a crackdown on money laundering by Colombian cartel figures Jorge Ochoa and Gilberto Rodríguez Orejuela. Noriega's new image as an opponent of drug trafficking was symbolized by his being invited as a speaker in 1985 to Harvard University, for a conference on the role of the military in Central America's wars, a speech which received a lot of attention in Panama's pro-government press. In 1986, a convoluted operation involving the East German Stasi and the Danish ship Pia Vesta ultimately aimed to sell Soviet arms and military vehicles to South Africa's Armscor, with the Soviets using various intermediaries to distance themselves from the deal. Noriega was apparently one of these intermediaries but backed out on the deal as the ship and weapons were seized at a Panamanian port.

=== Murder of Spadafora and aftermath ===
Hugo Spadafora was a physician and political activist who had first clashed with Noriega when they were both members of Torrijos's government. Though an ally of Torrijos, he and Noriega had been personal enemies for a long time. Despite not being a member of the opposition, he became a vocal critic of Noriega after returning to Panama from Guatemala in 1981. Spadafora amassed evidence of corruption within the government by using his position as an ally of Torrijos to question Noriega's allies, including Rodriguez and Carlton. This included a lengthy conversation with Carlton in mid-1985 after his drug operations had collapsed due to conflicts over a missing shipment, and he had received negative publicity in the Panamanian press. In September 1985 he accused Noriega of having connections to drug trafficking and announced his intent to expose him. The drug trafficking charges threatened Noriega's support among his own constituency of middle class individuals who had benefited under his and Torrijos's government.

According to writers R. M. Koster and Guillermo Sánchez, on an occasion when Spadafora was traveling by bus from Costa Rica to Panama, witnesses saw him being detained by the PDF after crossing the border. His decapitated body was later found wrapped in a United States Postal Service mail bag showing signs of brutal torture. Noriega was widely believed to be responsible for the murder, and according to Koster and Sánchez, the U.S. had intelligence implicating Noriega. On the day of Spadafora's arrest, the U.S. National Security Agency monitored a telephone conversation between Noriega and Luis Córdoba, the military commander in Chiriquí province where Spadafora was arrested. During the conversation Córdoba told Noriega, "We have the rabid dog." Noriega responded, "And what does one do with a dog that has rabies?"

Spadafora's murder badly damaged Noriega's image, both within and outside Panama, and created a crisis for the Panamanian regime. Barletta, who was in New York City when Spadafora was murdered in September 1985, announced his intention to appoint an independent commission to investigate the murder. Upon his return to Panama, however, he was forced to resign by the PDF and was replaced by Vice President Eric Arturo Delvalle. Barletta was highly regarded in the Reagan administration, and his removal brought a downturn in the relations between the U.S. and Noriega. After Spadafora's murder the U.S. began to view Noriega as a liability rather than an asset, despite his ongoing support for U.S. interventions elsewhere. The U.S. response included reducing economic assistance and pressuring Panama to reform its banking secrecy laws, crack down on narcotics trafficking, investigate the murder of Spadafora, and reduce the PDF's role in the government. The response to Spadafora's murder created divisions within the PRD, and further damaged the credibility of the government-controlled news media.

Díaz Herrera considered using the uproar around Spadafora to seize power during a brief period that Noriega was traveling outside the country, but despite mobilizing some troops, eventually decided against following through with the coup, realizing he could not count on sufficient support. Furthermore, Noriega had made a deal with his deputy, to the effect that he would step down as military leader in 1987 and allow Díaz Herrera to succeed him. In 1987, however, Noriega went back on this agreement, announced he would be heading the military for the next five years, and assigned Díaz Herrera to a diplomatic post. Díaz Herrera retaliated by making public statements accusing Noriega of rigging the 1984 election, murdering Spadafora, and of trafficking in drugs, as well as of assassinating Torrijos with a bomb on his plane.

Díaz Herrera's statements provoked huge protests against Noriega, with 100,000 people, approximately 25% of the population of Panama City, marching in protest on June 26, 1987. As with Spadafora's murder, these incidents strengthened and brought together the internal opposition to Noriega. Noriega charged Díaz Herrera with treason, and cracked down hard on the protesters. The U.S. Senate passed a resolution asking Noriega to step down until Díaz Herrera could be tried; in response Noriega sent government workers to protest outside the U.S. embassy, a protest which quickly turned into a riot. As a result, the U.S. suspended all military assistance to Panama, and the CIA stopped paying Noriega a salary. The Senate resolution had the effect of identifying the U.S. with the effort to remove Noriega; Noriega exploited the rising anti-American sentiment to strengthen his own position. Without the support of the U.S., Panama defaulted on its international debt, and that year the country's economy shrank by 20%. Though the U.S. considered not recognizing Delvalle as president, the State Department decided against it, as it would have amounted to breaking relations with Noriega.

=== 1989 election ===
Noriega's relationship with the U.S. deteriorated further during the late 1980s, particularly after the U.S. began to suspect that Noriega was supporting other intelligence services. Hersh wrote in 1986 that U.S. intelligence officials suspected that Noriega was selling intelligence to the Cuban government of Fidel Castro; his report received widespread attention. Bob Woodward published a story about Noriega in The Washington Post soon afterward, going into even greater detail about Noriega's intelligence connections. Woodward and Hersh's reputations made certain that the stories were taken seriously. Spadafora had also informed the U.S. Drug Enforcement Administration (DEA) of some of his findings about Noriega's involvement in drug smuggling. Multiple U.S. agencies continued to investigate Noriega despite opposition from the Reagan administration. In 1988 Noriega was indicted by U.S. federal grand juries in courts in Miami and Tampa on charges of drug-trafficking. The indictment accused him of "turning Panama into a shipping platform for South American cocaine that was destined for the U.S., and allowing drug proceeds to be hidden in Panamanian banks". Soon afterward an army colonel and a few soldiers made an attempt to overthrow Noriega; their poorly planned effort was crushed within a day.

The presidential election of May 1989 was marred by fraud and violence. Coalición para la Liberación Nacional (Coalition for National Liberation), a pro-military coalition led by the PRD, named Carlos Duque, a former business partner of Noriega, as its candidate. The Alianza Democrática de Oposición Cívica (Democratic Alliance of Civic Opposition), an opposition coalition, nominated Guillermo Endara, a member of Arias' Panameñista Party, and two other prominent oppositionists, Ricardo Arias Calderón and Guillermo Ford, as vice-presidential candidates. Anticipating fraud, the opposition tracked ballot counts at local precincts on the day of the election (local ballot counts were done in public). As an exit poll made it clear that the opposition slate was winning by a wide margin, reports of missing tally sheets and seizures of ballot boxes by the PDF soon emerged. In the afternoon of the day after the election, the Catholic bishops conference announced that a quick count of public tallies at polling centers showed the opposition slate winning 3–1, a larger margin than it had claimed in 1984. In contrast, official tallies the day after that, however, had Duque winning by a 2–1 margin.

Rather than publish the results, Noriega voided the election, claiming that "foreign interference" had tainted the results. Former U.S. President Jimmy Carter, present in Panama as an observer, denounced Noriega, saying the election had been "stolen", as did Archbishop of Panama Marcos G. McGrath. Noriega had initially planned to declare Duque the winner regardless of the actual result, but Duque knew he had been badly defeated and refused to go along. The next day, Endara, Arias Calderón, and Ford rolled through the old part of the capital in a triumphant motorcade, only to be intercepted by a detachment of Noriega's paramilitary Dignity Battalions. Arias Calderón was protected by a couple of troops, but Endara and Ford were badly beaten. Images of Ford running to safety with his guayabera shirt covered in blood were broadcast around the world. When the 1984–1989 presidential term expired, Noriega named a longtime associate, Francisco Rodríguez, acting president. The U.S. recognized Endara as the new president. Noriega's decision to void the election results led to another coup attempt against him in October 1989. A number of Noriega's junior officers rose up against him, led by Lieutenant Colonel Moisés Giroldi Vera, but the rebellion was easily crushed by the members of the PDF loyal to Noriega. After this attempt, he declared himself the "maximum leader" of the country. The rebels were captured and taken to a military base outside Panama City, where they were tortured and then executed.

== U.S. invasion of Panama ==
=== Genesis ===
In March 1988, the U.S. government entered into negotiations with Noriega seeking his resignation. Panama was represented at those negotiations by Rómulo Escobar Bethancourt. Negotiations collapsed after several months of lengthy and inconclusive talks; according to Dinges, Noriega had no intentions of ever resigning. On December 15, 1989, the PRD-dominated legislature spoke of "a state of war" between the United States and Panama. It also declared Noriega "chief executive officer" of the government, formalizing a state of affairs that had existed for six years. The U.S. government stated that Noriega's forces were harassing U.S. troops and civilians. Three incidents in particular occurred very near the time of the invasion, and were mentioned by Bush as a reason for the invasion. In a December 16 incident, four U.S. personnel were stopped at a roadblock outside PDF headquarters in the El Chorrillo neighborhood of Panama City. The United States Department of Defense said that the servicemen were traveling unarmed in a private vehicle, and that they attempted to flee the scene only after their vehicle was surrounded by a crowd of civilians and PDF troops. First Lieutenant Robert Paz of the United States Marine Corps was shot and killed in the incident. An American couple who witnessed the incident was also arrested and harassed by the PDF.

=== Invasion ===
The U.S. launched its invasion of Panama on December 20, 1989. Although the killing of the Marine was the ostensible reason for the invasion, the operation had been planned for months before his death. The move was the largest military action by the U.S. since the Vietnam War, and included more than 27,000 soldiers, as well as 300 aircraft.

The invasion began with a bombing campaign that targeted Noriega's private vehicles, and the PDF headquarters located in Panama City. Several slums in the middle of the city were destroyed as a result. The day after the invasion, Noriega's deputy Colonel Luis del Cid retreated with some soldiers to the mountains outside David City, after laying mines at the airport. Though this was part of a contingency plan for the invasion, del Cid quickly decided that the Panamanian military was not in a position to fight a guerrilla war against the U.S., and negotiated a surrender. Twenty-three U.S. soldiers were killed in the operation, including two that were killed by friendly fire; 324 soldiers were injured. Casualties among the Panamanian forces were much higher; between 300 and 845. The U.S. government reported between 202 and 250 civilian deaths; Americas Watch estimated 300 civilian deaths; and the United Nations estimated 500 civilian deaths.

On December 29, the United Nations General Assembly voted, 75–20 with 40 abstentions, to condemn the invasion as a "flagrant violation of international law". According to a CBS poll, 92% of Panamanian adults supported the U.S. incursion, and 76% wished that U.S. forces had invaded in October during the coup. Activist Barbara Trent disputed this finding, saying in a 1992 Academy Award-winning documentary The Panama Deception that the Panamanian surveys were completed in wealthy, English-speaking neighborhoods in Panama City, among Panamanians most likely to support U.S. actions. Human Rights Watch described the reaction of the civilian population to the invasion as "generally sympathetic".

=== Capture ===
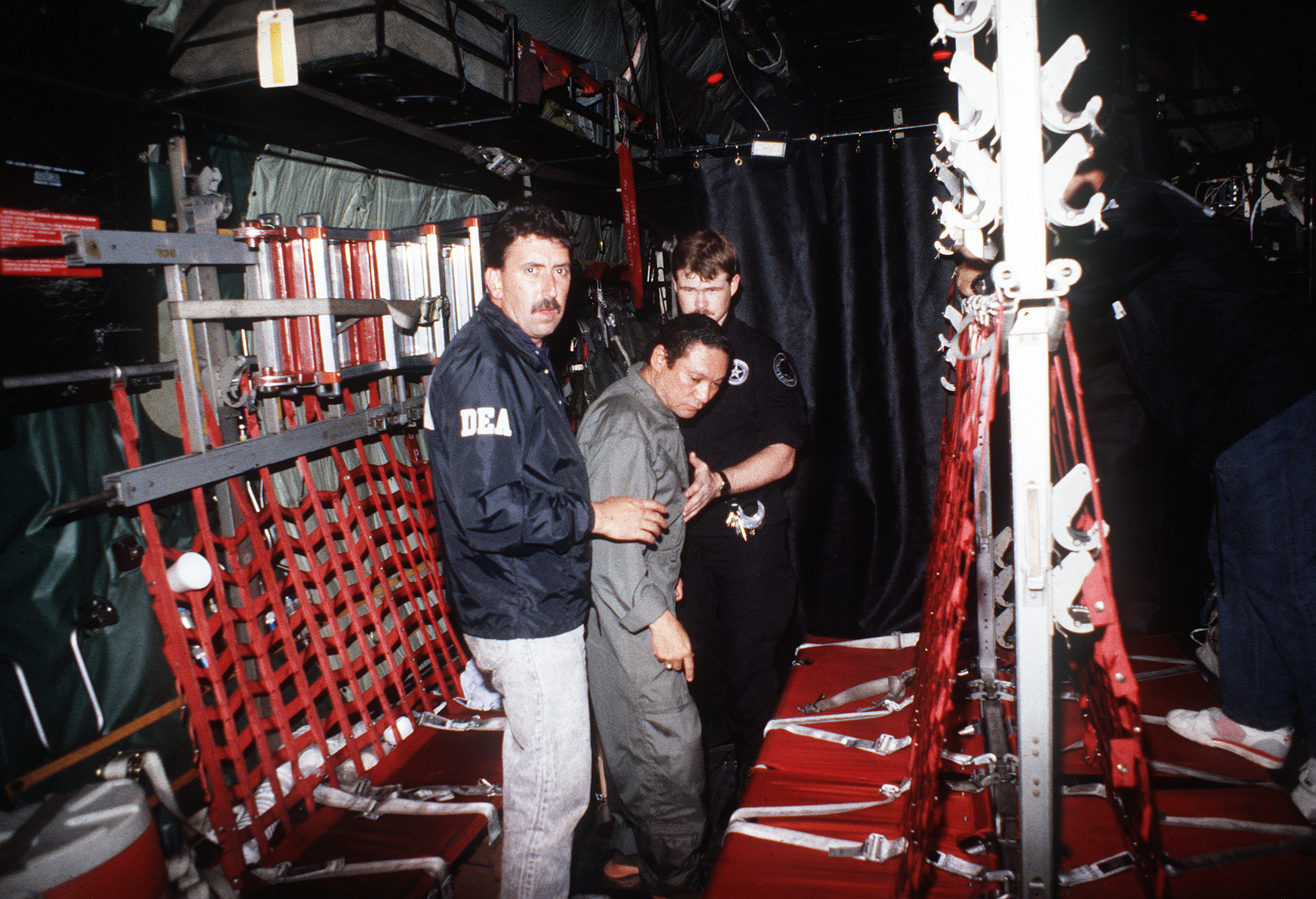
Noriega being escorted onto a U.S. Air Force aircraft by agents from the U.S. Drug Enforcement Administration (DEA) on January 3, 1990

Noriega received several warnings about the invasion from individuals within his government; though he initially disbelieved them, they grew more frequent as the invasion drew near, eventually convincing Noriega to go on the run. Noriega used a number of subterfuges, including lookalikes and playbacks of his recorded voice, to confuse U.S. surveillance as to his whereabouts. During his flight, Noriega reportedly took shelter with several supportive politicians, including Balbina Herrera, the mayor of San Miguelito. The last two days of his flight were spent partly with his ally Jorge Krupnick, an arms dealer also wanted by the U.S. Kempe reported that Noriega considered seeking sanctuary in the Cuban or Nicaraguan embassies, but both buildings were surrounded by U.S. troops. On the fifth day of the invasion, Noriega and four others took sanctuary in the Apostolic Nunciature, the Holy See's embassy in Panama. Having threatened to flee to the countryside and lead guerrilla warfare if not given refuge, he instead turned over the majority of his weapons, and requested sanctuary from Archbishop José Sebastián Laboa, the papal nuncio.

Prevented by treaty from invading the Holy See's embassy, U.S. soldiers from Delta Force and part of Operation Nifty Package erected a perimeter around the Nunciature. Attempts to dislodge Noriega from within included gunning vehicle engines, turning a nearby field into a landing pad for helicopters, and playing rock music at loud volumes (a Van Halen cassette tape was provided by Special Forces Sergeant John Bishop). After ten days, Noriega surrendered on January 3, 1990. He was detained as a prisoner of war, and later taken to the United States.

== Prosecution and imprisonment ==
=== Prosecution in the United States ===
Following his capture Noriega was transferred to a cell in the Miami federal courthouse, where he was arraigned on the ten charges which the Miami grand jury had returned two years earlier. The trial was delayed until September 1991 over whether Noriega could be tried after his detention as a prisoner of war, the admissibility of evidence and witnesses, and how to pay for Noriega's legal defense. The trial ended in April 1992, when Noriega was convicted on eight of the ten charges of drug trafficking, racketeering, and money laundering. On July 10, 1992, Noriega was sentenced to 40 years in prison.

In pre-trial proceedings, the government stated that Noriega had received $322,000 from the U.S. Army and the CIA. Noriega insisted that he had in fact been paid close to $10,000,000, and that he should be allowed to testify about the work he had done for the U.S. government. The district court held that information about the operations in which Noriega had played a part supposedly in return for payment from the U.S. was not relevant to his defense. It ruled that "the tendency of such evidence to confuse the issues before the jury substantially outweighed any probative value it might have had." One of the witnesses in the trial was Carlton, who had previously flown shipments of drugs for Noriega. Information about Noriega's connections to the CIA, including his alleged contact with Bush, were kept out of the trial. After the trial, Noriega appealed this exclusionary ruling by the judge to the Eleventh Circuit Court of Appeals. The court ruled in the government's favor, saying that the "potential probative value of this material [...] was relatively marginal".

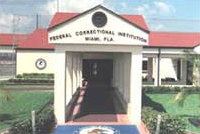
Noriega was incarcerated in the Federal Correctional Institution, Miami, in Dade County, Florida.

Before receiving his permanent prison assignment, Noriega was placed in the Federal Detention Center, Miami. Noriega was incarcerated in the Federal Correctional Institution, Miami. Under Article 85 of the Third Geneva Convention, Noriega was considered a prisoner of war, despite his conviction for acts committed prior to his capture by the "detaining power" (the U.S.). This status meant that he had his own prison cell, furnished with electronics and exercise equipment. His cell was nicknamed "the presidential suite". While Noriega was in prison, he was visited regularly over two years by two evangelical Christian ministers, Clift Brannon and Rudy Hernandez. Noriega, nominally a Roman Catholic, was reported to have undergone a conversion to evangelical Christianity in May 1990, and was baptized in October 1992, while still in prison. Noriega's prison sentence was reduced from 40 to 30 years by the judge, then to 17 years for good behavior. His U.S. sentence thus ended on September 9, 2007, though his incarceration ended up being extended while extradition requests by other countries were being adjudicated.

=== Prosecution in Panama ===
Noriega was tried in absentia in Panama for crimes committed during his rule. In October 1993 Noriega and two others were convicted of the murder of Spadafora by the court of the Third Judicial District, and sentenced to 20 years in prison. Panama's Supreme Court confirmed the sentence on December 20, 1995. In 1994, Noriega and Heráclides Sucre, an agent of his secret police, were convicted by a jury of the murder of Giroldi, who had led the 1989 coup attempt against Noriega. Though Noriega was tried in absentia, a judge traveled to the U.S. to question him in December 1993. Noriega and Sucre both received a 20-year sentence, the maximum penalty sought by the prosecutor. Finally, Noriega received a third 20-year sentence in 1996 for his role in the death of nine military officers supporting Giroldi; the group had been executed in a hangar at the Albrook air base after the coup attempt, in an incident that came to be known as the massacre of Albrook. Noriega was also prosecuted over the 1968 disappearances of Luis Antonio Quirós and Everett Clayton Kimble Guerra in Chiriquí, and the 1971 death of Heliodoro Portugal. These cases had not reached a conclusion at the time of his death in 2017.

=== Prosecution in France ===
The French government had requested Noriega's extradition after he was convicted of money laundering in 1999. It stated that Noriega had laundered $3 million in drug proceeds by purchasing luxury apartments in Paris. Noriega was convicted in absentia, but French law required a new trial after the subject of an in absentia sentence was apprehended. France had previously made Noriega a Commandeur of the Légion d'honneur in 1987.

In August 2007, a U.S. federal judge approved the French government's request to extradite Noriega to France after his release. Noriega appealed his extradition because he claimed France would not honor his legal status as a prisoner of war. Though Noriega had been scheduled to be released in 2007, he remained incarcerated while his appeal was pending in court. The Supreme Court of the United States refused to hear his appeal in January 2010, and in March declined a petition for a rehearing. Two days after the refusal, the District Court for the Southern District of Florida in Miami lifted the stay that was blocking Noriega's extradition. Later that month Noriega's attorney stated that he would travel to France and try to arrange a deal with the French government.

Noriega was extradited to France on April 26, 2010. Noriega's lawyers claimed the La Santé Prison, at which he was held, was unfit for a man of his age and rank; the French government refused to grant him prisoner of war status, which he had maintained in the United States. On July 7, 2010, Noriega was convicted by the 11th chamber of the Tribunal Correctionnel de Paris and sentenced to seven years in jail. The prosecutor in the case had sought a ten-year prison term. In addition, the court ordered the seizure of €2.3 million (approximately U.S. $3.6 million) that had long been frozen in Noriega's French bank accounts.

== Return, illness, and death ==
In 1999, the Panamanian government had sought the extradition of Noriega from the U.S., as he had been tried in absentia and found guilty of murder in Panama in 1995. After Noriega was imprisoned in France, Panama asked the French government to extradite Noriega so he could face trial for human rights violations in Panama. The French government had previously stated that extradition would not happen before the case in France had run its course. On September 23, 2011, a French court ordered a conditional release for Noriega to be extradited to Panama on October 1, 2011. Noriega was extradited to Panama on December 11, 2011, and incarcerated at El Renacer prison to serve the sentences, totalling 60 years, that he had accumulated in absentia for crimes committed during his rule.

On February 5, 2012, Noriega was moved to Hospital Santo Tomás in Panama City because of high blood pressure and a brain hemorrhage. He remained in the hospital for four days before being returned to prison. It was announced on March 21, 2012, that Noriega had been diagnosed with a brain tumor, which was later revealed to have been benign. On January 23, 2017, he was released from prison and placed under house arrest to prepare for surgery that would remove the tumor. On March 7, 2017, he suffered a brain hemorrhage during surgery which left him in critical condition in the intensive care unit of Hospital Santo Tomás. Noriega died on May 29, 2017, at the age of 83. Panamanian President Juan Carlos Varela announced Noriega's death shortly before midnight, writing, "The death of Manuel A. Noriega closes a chapter in our history; his daughters and his relatives deserve to bury him in peace." Noriega was cremated.

== Image and legacy ==
Noriega's authoritarian rule of Panama has been described as a dictatorship, while Noriega himself has been referred to as a "strongman". A 2017 obituary from the BBC stated that Noriega "was an opportunist who used his close relationship with the United States to boost his own power in Panama and to cover up the illegal activities for which he was eventually convicted". A 2010 article in The Guardian referred to him as the best known dictator of his time, and as "Panama's answer to Libyan leader Colonel Muammar Gaddafi". Dinges writes that though Noriega's regime saw a number of murders and crimes, they were similar in scale to those that occurred at the same time under the authoritarian governments of Guatemala, Chile, Argentina, and El Salvador; these governments never saw the level of condemnation from the U.S. that Noriega's did. Others likened him to former Iraqi president Saddam Hussein. Like Saddam, Noriega enjoyed brief U.S. support until he turned into an enemy.

After Noriega's death, an article in The Atlantic compared him to Castro and Augusto Pinochet, stating that while Castro had been the nemesis of the U.S., and Pinochet had been its ally, Noriega had managed to be both. It called Noriega the archetype of U.S. intervention in Latin America: "The lawless, vicious leader whom the U.S. cultivated and propped up despite clear and serious flaws." The author stated that although Panama was a freer democracy after Noriega's removal, it was still plagued by corruption and drug trafficking, while Daniel Ortega, whom the U.S. tried to fight with Noriega's help, remained firmly in power in Nicaragua, and argued that this demonstrated the failure of the U.S.'s approach to Latin American interventions.

Noriega took great care to shape perceptions of him. He permitted and encouraged rumors that as Panama's chief of intelligence, he was in possession of negative information about everybody in the country. Dinges suggests that the impression among some officials that Noriega made money off of every transaction in the country may have been cultivated by Noriega himself. Among opposition leaders in Panama, he was seen variously as a sexual pervert, a sadist, and a rapist. Within U.S. government circles, contradictory images abounded; Noriega was seen as a CIA spy, a drug trafficker, a nationalist supporting Torrijos, an ally of Cuba, and an ally of Oliver North and the Contras. He was perceived as a trusted collaborator in the war against drugs, even as the DEA was investigating him for involvement in smuggling. By the time of his removal, he had come to be hated in the U.S., and the invasion was portrayed as an attempt to remove an evil man. Dinges writes that these contradictory images played a large role in shaping the U.S. government's self-contradictory policy towards Noriega.

Noriega used the moniker "El Man" to refer to himself, but he was also derogatorily known as cara de piña, or "pineapple face" in Spanish, as a result of pockmarked features left by acne in his youth. He detested the name, and it would later be the subject of a lawsuit. When finally arrested and taken to detention by the Americans, the ‘pineapple’ moniker resurfaced in the form of an oft heard chant "the Pineapple’s in the can". He lived a lavish lifestyle during his time as the de facto ruler of Panama, described in an obituary as a "libertine life off drug-trade riches, complete with luxurious mansions, cocaine-fueled parties and voluminous collections of antique guns". His bravado during public speeches was remarked upon by commentators; for instance, after his indictment in the U.S., he made a public speech while brandishing a machete, and declaimed "Not one step back!" The attitude of machismo that Noriega adopted has been described as a reaction to the persecution which his half-brother Luis faced as an openly homosexual man in Panama and Peru. This image of strength contrasted sharply with the impact of a mug shot which was taken of him after his capture, and the photo became a symbol of his fall from power. He was described as a deeply superstitious man, who placed trust in a number of talismans which he carried with him.

Guy Debord wrote that Noriega's career exemplified a path to power for rulers in his era, calling him "a sort of statesman in a sort of state, a sort of general, a capitalist... who sells everything and fakes everything, in a world which does precisely the same thing."

His capture received renewed media attention when on the exact same day, 36 years later, Venezuelan president Nicolás Maduro was abducted by the same U.S. government agency under similar reasoning.

== In popular culture ==
British actor Bob Hoskins portrayed Manuel Noriega in the biographical 2000 American television movie Noriega: God's Favorite. Noriega was also depicted in the 2012 video game Call of Duty: Black Ops II. In July 2014, he filed a lawsuit against the game company Activision for depicting him and using his name without his permission. Noriega, who filed the suit while in prison for murder, claimed he was portrayed as "a kidnapper, murderer and enemy of the state". On October 28, 2014, the case against Activision was dismissed in California by Judge William H. Fahey.

== Honours ==
=== National honours ===
- Panama:
  - Collar of the Order of Manuel Amador Guerrero

=== Foreign honours ===
- Argentina:
  - Grand Cross of the Order of the Liberator General San Martín
- France:
  - Commander of the Legion of Honour
- Peru:
  - Grand Cross of the Order of the Sun of Peru

== See also ==
- History of Panama

== Bibliography ==
- Albert, Steven (1993). The Case Against the General: Manuel Noriega and the Politics of American Justice. New York: C. Scribner's Sons. ISBN 978-0-684-19375-5.
- Buckley, Kevin (1991). Panama: The Whole Story. Simon & Schuster. ISBN 0-671-72794-X.
- Dinges, John (1990). Our Man in Panama. Random House. ISBN 978-0-8129-1950-9.
- Galván, Javier A. (December 21, 2012). Latin American Dictators of the 20th Century: The Lives and Regimes of 15 Rulers. McFarland. ISBN 978-0-7864-6691-7.
- Gilboa, Eytan (1995). "The Panama Invasion Revisited: Lessons for the Use of Force in the Post Cold War Era". Political Science Quarterly. 110 (4): 539–562. doi:10.2307/2151883. JSTOR 2151883. Archived from the original on April 26, 2012.
- Harding, Robert C. (2006). The History of Panama. Greenwood Press. ISBN 978-0-313-33322-4.
- Kempe, Frederick (1990). Divorcing the Dictator: America's Bungled Affair with Noriega. I.B. Tauris. ISBN 978-0-399-13517-0.
- Koster, R.M.; Sánchez, Guillermo (1990). In the Time of the Tyrants: Panama, 1968–1990. New York: Norton. ISBN 978-0-393-02696-2.
- Metz, Allan (1991). "Manuel Noriega and the 'Panama Crisis': An Annotated Bibliography". Reference Services Review. 19 (3): 7–44. doi:10.1108/eb049128.
- Ropp, Steve C. (January 1992). "Explaining the Long-Term Maintenance of a Military Regime: Panama Before the U.S. Invasion". World Politics. 44 (2): 210–234. doi:10.2307/2010447. JSTOR 2010447. S2CID 153869349.
- Scranton, Margaret E. (1991). The Noriega Years: U.S.-Panamanian Relations, 1981–1990. L. Rienner Publishers. ISBN 978-1-55587-204-5.

Military offices
Preceded by Rubén Darío Paredes	Military Leader of Panama; 1983–1989	Succeeded by Guillermo Endara (as President of Panama)
