= Roberto Díaz =

Roberto Díaz may refer to:

- Roberto Díaz (footballer) (born 1953), Argentine footballer
- Roberto Díaz (golfer) (born 1987), Mexican golfer
- Roberto Díaz (violist), Chilean-American violist
- Roberto Díaz Herrera (born 1937), Panamanian colonel
- Roberto "Ra" Díaz, Chilean musician, current bassist for the band Korn
