= Jorge Krupnick =

Panamanian businessman

Jorge Rogelio Krupnick is a Panamanian businessman who was closely associated with Panamanian dictator Manuel Noriega during the 1980s. He has been described as an arms dealer and was allegedly wanted by U.S. authorities for connections to narcotics trafficking and money laundering.

== Early life and background ==
Details about Krupnick's early life and background are not well documented in public sources.

== Association with Manuel Noriega ==
Krupnick was a close business associate and ally of General Manuel Noriega during his rule over Panama in the 1980s. His association with the dictator is extensively documented in books about the Noriega years.

=== 1989 U.S. invasion ===
During the United States invasion of Panama in December 1989, Krupnick provided shelter to Noriega in his Panama City home during the final two days before the dictator sought sanctuary at the Apostolic Nunciature. At the time, Krupnick himself was reportedly wanted by U.S. authorities.

== Legal issues ==
=== Libel case against Frederick Kempe ===
In April 1990, Krupnick filed criminal libel charges in Panama against Frederick Kempe, then the chief diplomatic correspondent for The Wall Street Journal, following the publication of Kempe's book Divorcing the Dictator: America's Bungled Affair with Noriega. In the book, Kempe described Krupnick as an arms dealer whose name appeared on a U.S. government wanted list for alleged narcotics and drug connections.

Kempe was served with a summons while signing books at the Pavo Real restaurant in Panama City and was initially banned from leaving the country. The travel ban was lifted three days later after Kempe presented documentation about Krupnick from U.S. government sources. Under Panamanian libel law at the time, a writer had to accuse someone in print of committing a crime to be indicted.

=== Money laundering investigation ===
Krupnick was named in a prominent Miami money-laundering case in 1994. According to reports, a database search by the St. Petersburg Times turned up more than a dozen newspaper articles linking him to money-laundering investigations in the United States.

== Business activities ==
=== Mobil Oil consulting contract ===
In 1996, Mobil Oil hired Krupnick as one of three Panamanian consultants to help secure a concession for a former U.S. military fuel terminal in Panama. The company established Alireza Mobil Terminals and agreed to pay the three consultants 25 percent of net profits if they won the contract.

After being awarded the contract in January 1997, Mobil discovered during post-award vetting that Krupnick had been an associate and alleged arms dealer for Manuel Noriega, who by then was imprisoned in Miami following his drug trafficking conviction. The company stated that Krupnick's association with the dictator was "well-documented in several books" about the Noriega years.

In May 1997, Mobil terminated the consultancy contract to "avoid the appearance of any impropriety" and agreed to buy out the three Panamanians for $2.7 million, payable in monthly installments over five years. A Mobil spokesman stated: "Looking back, it would appear that the vetting of individuals perhaps was not as thorough as it might have been."
