= Rómulo Escobar Bethancourt =

Panamanian politician and diplomat

Rómulo Escobar Bethancourt (September 5, 1927 – September 28, 1995) was a Panamanian politician and diplomat. He was known for his role in negotiating the Panama Canal treaties in 1977.

== Biography ==
Escobar was trained as a criminal lawyer, and was a member of the communist party in Panama. Due to his political views he was initially jailed by the right-wing government of Omar Torrijos when it took power after a coup in 1968. However, he later became an advisor to Torrijos's government. In the aftermath of the Leyla Express and Johnny Express incidents in 1971, in which two freighters bearing Panamanian flags were seized by the Cuban government on suspicion of transporting arms and mercenaries to Cuba, Escobar led the Panamanian delegation to Cuba to negotiate the release of the captain of one of the freighters.

Escobar was appointed Panama's chief negotiator when the United States and Panama negotiated the 1977 Panama Canal treaties. In this position, he helped Panama regain partial control over the Panama Canal, which had been in United States control since 1903. He was described as a capable diplomat. In 1979 he became one of the founders of the Democratic Revolutionary Party (Partido Revolucionario Democrático, PRD), the political arm of the Panamanian military, and served as its president.

When Manuel Noriega became the de facto leader of Panama in 1983 Escobar kept his position as a political advisor. In 1988 the United States demanded that Noriega be removed from his position; Escobar again represented Panama in the negotiations that followed. Arguing against the United States' position, Escobar stated "We don't accept that the United States can dictate when we can or cannot be in our country, be it Noriega or any other Panamanian." The negotiations were unsuccessful, and after the United States invasion of Panama in 1989 removed Noriega from power, Escobar was jailed. When the PRD came back to power after elections in 1994, Escobar was made an advisor to the foreign affairs minister.

Escobar served for a period as the rector of the University of Panama. He wrote the book, Torrijos: ¡Colonia americana no!, about the government of Torrijos. He died in 1995 in a hospital in Panama City. A local news service reported throat cancer as the cause of death.
