= 1977 Panamanian Torrijos–Carter Treaties referendum =

A referendum on the Torrijos–Carter Treaties was held in Panama on 23 October 1977. Voters were asked whether they approved of the treaties with the United States, which would give Panama control of the Panama Canal in 1999 and abrogate the Hay–Bunau-Varilla Treaty of 1903. Around 67% voted in favour, with a voter turnout of 97.3%.

== Results ==
Choice	Votes	%
For	506,805	67.4
Against	245,117	32.6
Invalid/blank votes	14,310	–
Total	766,232	100
Registered voters/turnout	787,251	97.3
Source: Nohlen
