= Leyla Express and Johnny Express incidents =

Freighters seized by Cuban gunboats

In December 1971, the freighters Leyla Express and Johnny Express were seized by Cuban gunboats. The Leyla Express was stopped in international waters off the Cuban coast on December 5; the Johnny Express was intercepted by gunboats near the island of Little Inagua in the Bahamas ten days later. Some of the crew of the Johnny Express, including the captain, were injured when the gunboats fired on their vessel. The freighters both carried Panamanian flags of convenience, but belonged to the Bahama Lines corporation, based in Miami. The company was run by four brothers, Cuban exiles who had previously been involved in activities directed against the Cuban government of Fidel Castro. Cuba stated that both vessels were being used by the United States Central Intelligence Agency (CIA) to transport weapons, explosives, and personnel to Cuba, and described the vessels as being engaged in piracy. Cuba had suspected the involvement of one of Bahama Lines's ships in shelling the Cuban village of Samá, on the northern coast of Oriente Province, a few months previously; several civilians had died in the attack. The US government of Richard Nixon and the Bahama Lines denied the accusations.

Cuba released the crew of both ships to Panamanian custody, but announced that José Villa, the captain of the Johnny Express, had confessed to being an agent of the CIA, and would face trial. The US asked the Panamanian government of Omar Torrijos to negotiate his release. Rómulo Escobar Bethancourt and Manuel Noriega traveled to Cuba, where they negotiated Villa's release into Panamanian custody, in return for which criminal charges were brought against Villa in Panama, though he was released without being convicted. The success of the negotiations undertaken by Noriega were later used by him to bargain with the US government. As a consequence of the incident, the US ordered all its naval and air forces in the region to go to the aid of any ships coming under attack from Cuban vessels. A Panamanian mission which investigated the incident concluded, based on the ships' logs, that the vessels had in fact brought insurgent forces to Cuban territory, and that the Cuban government's accusations on that count were accurate.

== Background ==
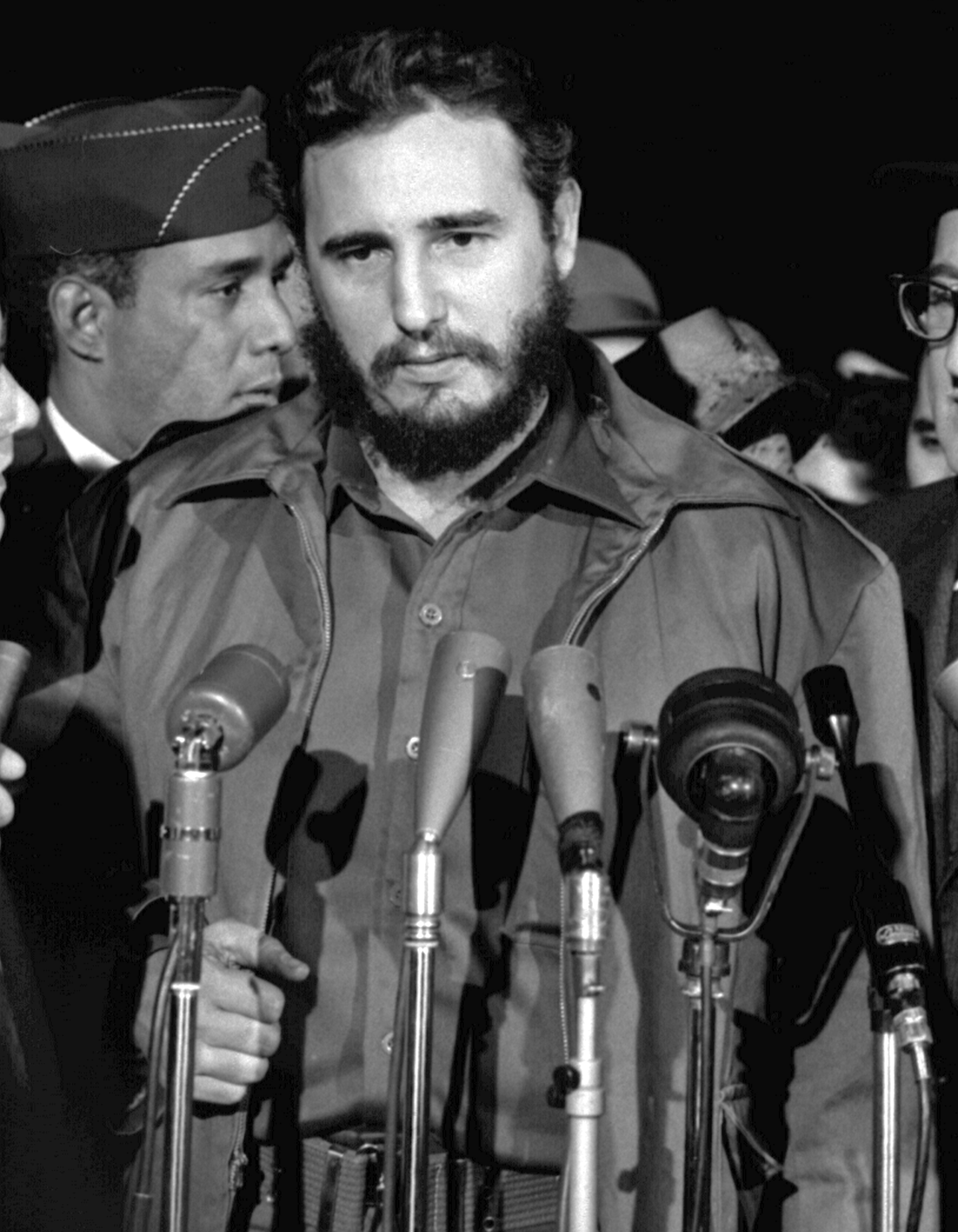
The Cuban government of Fidel Castro was the target of attacks from Cuban exiles.

The Johnny Express and the Leyla Express (Note: Also described as the Lyle Express, the Lalia Express, and the Lyla Express.) were two Miami-based freighters flying Panamanian flags of convenience. They were owned by the Bahama Lines corporation, based in Miami, which also ran four other freighters. The corporation was owned by four brothers from the Babún family: all four were Cuban exiles. The Miami Herald reported that all four had been involved in activities directed against the government of Fidel Castro, while the New York Times wrote that the brothers were opposed to the Cuban government, and had aided actions against it. Among Cuban exiles in Miami, Santiago Babún, one of the brothers, was believed to have been an agent of the United States Central Intelligence Agency (CIA) while in Cuba. According to reporter John Dinges both freighters were being used by Cuban exiles to launch machine-gun attacks on Cuban government targets. In discussing the relationship between former director of Central Intelligence and US president George H. W. Bush and Panamanian leader Manuel Noriega in a 1997 biography of Bush, historian Herbert Parmet stated that the two freighters had been used to launch speed-boat attacks against Cuba.

The Cuban government believed that a boat owned by one of the brothers was responsible for shelling the Cuban village of Samá, on the northern coast of Oriente Province, in October 1971; several people were reported to have been killed in the attack. Cuban radio stations had reported that the attackers had fled on a "mother ship". On October 15 the Miami News reported that a spokesperson for José Elias de la Torriente, a Cuban exile, had claimed responsibility for the attack at Sama. The spokesperson said that the attack had been against a military base, and that it was "just the beginning" of their plans to fight the Cuban government. According to the New York Times, information available to it suggested that vessels owned by the Babún brothers did not participate in the raid on Samá. Several months before December 1971, the Bahama Lines were reported to have complained to the US government that their ships were being followed by Cuban vessels. The company stated that the US Coast Guard had been notified of every incident, but that the Coast Guard had not taken any action.

== Vessel seizures ==
On December 5, 1971, the Leyla Express was stopped by Cuban government vessels in international waters off the coast of Cuba, and escorted to the port of Baracoa. The Cuban government stated that the ship was being used to transport weapons and agents by the CIA, and added that the Leyla Express had been used to land explosives, men, and weapons on Cuban shores three times in 1968 and 1969. The Cuban government called the vessel a pirate ship, and said that the 14 members of the freighter's crew would face criminal charges.

A map showing the islands of Little and Great Inagua in the Bahamas. The coasts of Cuba and the US state of Florida are also visible.

On December 15, 1971, the Johnny Express was attacked by a Cuban gunboat, seized, and taken to a Cuban port. The attack occurred in the territorial waters of the Bahamas, near the island of Little Inagua. According to officials of the Bahama Lines, the freighter had left Port-au-Prince in Haiti the previous day. At the time of its capture, the Johnny Express was approximately 120 miles (190 km) from the Cuban coast. The 235 ft (72 m) ship was carrying a crew of 11: its captain, José Villa, was naturalized US citizen who had left Cuba as an exile. (Note: Villa is variously described in news reports as Cuban-born or Spanish-born.)

The Miami Herald reported that Villa had an approximately three-hour-long conversation on the radio with the office of the Bahama Lines, beginning at approximately 11:35 am on December 15, when Villa radioed saying he was being followed by a gunboat, in response to which he had changed course northwards. He then reported that he had been ordered to heave to; the company stated that it had asked Villa to continue on his way, because he was in international waters. At 1:31 pm, Villa reported that the gunboat had opened fire, and that he himself had been wounded, adding that the "deck [was] covered in blood". The New York Times later reported that Villa's wounds were serious. Further reports of firing followed, including of shots fired at the radio antenna, and of the gunboat ramming the freighter. The final report, at 2:40 pm, stated that the freighter was taking on water. According to the US Coast Guard, the strafing was carried out with a machine gun. A later report, attributed to the US State Department, stated that the Johnny Express was being towed to Cuba: a January 1972 report in the Miami News stated that the ship had been escorted to Baracoa, rather than towed. The wounded crew members were transported by the Cuban gunboat to Havana for treatment.

== Reactions, negotiations and trials ==
The Cuban government described the actions of both freighters as acts of piracy. It stated that it would attack pirate ships regardless of the distance of the ship from Cuba, or the flag the ship was carrying. Castro criticized the "landing of weapons, organization of mercenary bands, infiltration of spies, saboteurs, [and] arm drops of all kinds," and stated that the Cuban government had been forced to spend "fabulous sums" of money and resources to combat these efforts. Castro stated that both ships had been used in operations to Cuba from 1968 to 1970. He also claimed that Villa had confessed to being a CIA agent and to participating in operations against Cuba from 1964 to 1966, but did not accuse Villa of covert operations about the Johnny Express. Castro stated that a different freighter, the Akuarias II, also registered in Panama, had taken part in the raid on Sama. He said that the capture of the Leyla Express and the Johnny Express had been provoked by the Sama raid, and that they "served notice" to the US government that it needed to stop such raids.

Teófilo Babún, one of the owners of the Bahama Lines, denied that the ships were engaged in piracy, and stated that they were commercial vessels that did not carry any weapons. The Babún brothers stated that the Johnny Express was on its way back from Haiti, where she had been chartered, when the ship was attacked. A spokesperson for the US Department of State also said that the vessels had no connection to the US government, and that they were not transporting weapons and personnel to Cuba. A day after the capture of the Johnny Express, the US government responded stating that it would take "all measures under international law" to protect ships in the Caribbean, including those of other nations, from Cuban attacks. The New York Times reported that the US naval and air forces in the Caribbean had been ordered to support any vessel attacked by Cuba. Soon after the capture of the Johnny Express, the US federal government impounded the Akuarias II in Florida. Cuban exile leaders were summoned by Matthew Smith, Cuban Affairs coordinator in Miami for the State Department, and told the US government would strictly enforce its policy against raids on Cuba by Cuban exiles in the US.

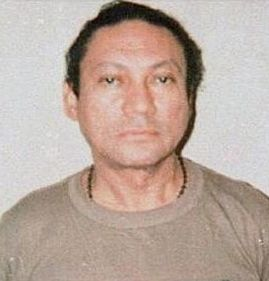
Manuel Noriega in 1989. Noriega played a crucial role in the negotiations for the release of José Villa.

US president Richard Nixon told José Villa's wife Isabel that he would do his best to get her husband released. The US issued a demand to Cuba, via the Swiss embassy in Havana, that Villa be released; Cuba did not respond to the request. In late December, the Panamanian government accepted a Cuban invitation to send a delegation to investigate and discuss the incident. Cuba and Panama did not have diplomatic relations at the time. The three-person delegation arrived in Havana on December 25. It was led by Jorge Illeuca, a legal advisor to the Panamanian foreign ministry. Its other members were Rómulo Escobar Bethancourt, then the rector of the University of Panama, and Arlos Gonzales de Lastra, described as an expert on the merchant navy. Following negotiations, most members of the crews of both ships, numbering more than twenty individuals, were handed over to the government of Panama on December 27, 1971. Upon his return to the US, one of the released crewman stated that Cuban interrogators had tried to scare the crew into admitting they had participated in transporting weapons or men to Cuba.

José Villa remained in Cuban custody: he faced trial, having confessed, according to the Cuban government, to being an agent of the CIA. A few other crewmen, who were nationals or former residents of Cuba, were held with Villa. Illeuca stated that Villa and two others detained in Cuba, Jose Torres and Pablo Gari, had confessed to participating in covert operations. A report for United Press International called Villa a "virtual political hostage". The US government asked Omar Torrijos, the leader of Panama, to send a mission to Cuba to mediate the conflict. According to Dinges, at approximately the same time, the CIA station in Panama City was ordered to send Manuel Noriega on the mission as a personal emissary of Torrijos. Noriega's relationship with the US intelligence services, which had been on a case-by-case basis until then, was regularized in mid-1970, soon after Noriega was promoted to lieutenant colonel and received command of the intelligence branch of the Panamanian Natioanal Guard.

The formal mission to Cuba was led by Bethancourt, a communist member of Torrijos's government, but Noriega accompanied him. According to William Jorden, a US diplomat and National Security Council aide who was later the country's ambassador to Panama, was Noriega's presence which convinced Cuban leader Fidel Castro to release Villa into Panamanian custody. Parmet wrote that Noriega played an "important, possibly decisive," role in the negotiations. During the negotiations, a "growing affinity" was reported between the two governments. Villa was taken to Panama in February 1973, where in accordance with the agreement with Castro, charges of espionage were brought against Villa. Villa's wife was able to visit him in Panama. In October 1973 Villa was convicted in a Panamanian court of carrying out operations against Cuba using a Panamanian vessel. Villa denied the charges. The court stated that he had admitted participating in three "counterrevolutionary incursions" against Cuba, on ships with other captains. Crewmembers of the Johnny Express testified to its use in operations against Cuba. Villa was sentenced to 16 months imprisonment, but was freed immediately as he had already been detained for a longer period. Villa returned to Miami in the same month, after 14 months in prison in Cuba and another eight in Panama. The delay before his release and return to the US was described by Dinges as being long enough to "save face all around".

Gari was released in September 1972, and flown to Panama. Under an agreement signed in December 1972, Cuba handed over the two freighters to Panama, which undertook to keep them Panamanian government property and not return them to their owners in Miami: the ships reached Panama in April 1973. Torres was sentenced and jailed for three years in Cuba, and was released from prison in December 1974: his ability to return to the US was reported to be unclear. A final crewmember was reported to likely have died while imprisoned in Cuba.

== Investigation and impact ==
The commission from Panama led by Illeuca submitted its report to the Panamanian government at the end of December 1971. Based on examinations of the ships' log books, the commission concluded that the ships had in fact been engaged in bringing insurgent forces to Cuban territory, and that the Cuban government's claims on that count were accurate. Shortly after the commission submitted its report, Panamanian government sources stated that the ships had participated in attacks against Cuba in 1968 and 1969. A case study of the incident in the US armed forces journal The JAG Journal stated that the reported violent actions of the armed personnel carried by the Leyla Express and the Johnny Express met the definition for piracy. However, it stated that since the actions of the two ships had the objective of overthrowing the Cuban government, they constituted political actions, and therefore could not be considered acts of piracy. The negotiations carried out by Manuel Noriega were the most substantial assistance he had given the US government up to that point; he and Torrijos would use the success of the mission as a bargaining chip in subsequent negotiations with the US. Jorden noted that Noriega was introduced to Castro at the behest of the US, a fact Dinges described as ironic; Noriega would have prolonged relations with Castro's government, including sharing intelligence with it. In April 1972, as a consequence of the Johnny Express incident, the US ordered all of its warships in the Caribbean region to assist ships from any country friendly to the US, should they come under attack from Cuban ships.

== Sources ==
- Dinges, John (1990). Our Man in Panama. New York City: Random House. ISBN 978-0-394-54910-1.
- Franklin, Jane (May 2016). Cuba and the U.S. Empire: A Chronological History. NYU Press. ISBN 978-1-58367-606-6.
- Gehring, Robert W. (1973). "Defense against Insurgents on the High Seas: The Lyla Express and Johnny Express". The JAG Journal. 27 (3). ISSN 0021-3519.
- Jorden, William J. (March 1, 2014). Panama Odyssey. University of Texas Press. ISBN 978-0-292-71801-2.
- Parmet, Herbert S. (1997). George Bush: The Life of a Lone Star Yankee. Transaction Publishers. ISBN 978-1-4128-2452-1.
