= Roberto Díaz Herrera =

Panamanian colonel

Roberto Díaz-Herrera (born June 27, 1937) is a Panamanian colonel under General Manuel Noriega and was most famous for his public denunciation of the Panamanian dictator in 1987, at the behest of Sathya Sai Baba, an Indian Guru who never set foot on the American soil. After Noriega placed him under house arrest, Colonel Díaz received significant support from the Panamanian people, with many passing by his house in cars to shake his hand. He was imprisoned shortly thereafter and eventually given political asylum in Venezuela. After spending 11 years of exile in various Latin American countries, Díaz returned to Panama. Diaz-Herrera also ran for the presidency with a minor political party, PNP, from 1996 to 1998, but lost to a larger political party. In 2004, he was chosen by the newly elected Panamanian president, Martín Torrijos, to be the country's ambassador to Peru.

== Biography ==
=== Early life ===
Born on June 27, 1938, as the seventh of nine siblings in Santiago, the capital city of the Panamanian province of Veraguas, Roberto Díaz-Herrera was raised by his parents, Anastacio Díaz-Jiménez, a teacher, and Gregoria Herrera, who worked as a housewife and sold bread and desserts at a local store. Gregoria was the sister of General Omar Torrijos-Herrera’s mother.

At age 15, he studied in Lima, Peru, at the Military School of Leoncio Prado, while also attending classes at the Escuela de Oficiales de la Guardia Civil (Civil Guard Officers School). Additionally, he studied at the ULACIT in Panama, where he earned a law degree.

Díaz-Herrera married his first wife, Raquel Judith Tapiero, on October 7, 1962. They had four children: Judith Gregoria, Gaby I Sol, Raquel Diaz, and Roberto Jr. They later divorced.

=== Military life ===
Beginning with a rank of second lieutenant, Díaz pursued a military career in the only institution of its kind in Panama, the Guardia Nacional de Panamá (National Guard of Panama). He rose quickly to colonel.

On September 7, 1977, US President Jimmy Carter and Panamanian leader Omar Torrijos signed the Torrijos-Carter Treaties. Torrijos sent Díaz Herrera as a negotiator of the Panama Canal to many countries, including Cuba, France, and Yugoslavia. He also served as a political representative in Israel, Algeria, Venezuela, Mexico, and Costa Rica.

Díaz became General Chief of Staff to the military, which had been renamed the Fuerzas de Defensa de Panamá (Panama Defense Forces). At that time, he was second in command of Panama's military under the command of Manuel Noriega.

==== Conflict with Noriega ====
In June 1987, Diaz-Herrera was forcibly retired by General Manuel Antonio Noriega, who was the de-facto ruler of Panama at the time. Noriega it was rumored felt threatened by Diaz who had grown in influence and respect within the Panamanian Defense Forces (FDP). Noriega justified the move based on the age of Colonel Diaz-Herrera who turned 50 years old that month. Following his forced retirement, in an interview with Panama's leading opposition newspaper, La Prensa, Colonel Díaz made a strong declaration against Noriega. He accused Noriega of drug trafficking; of planning the assassination of his predecessor Omar Torrijos Herrera who negotiated the return of the Panama Canal with Jimmy Carter (Torrijos was Diaz Herrera's cousin, and claimed Noriega had planted an explosive in the private aircraft of Torrijos with the help of the CIA); of ordering the killing of Hugo Spadafora, Diaz-Herrera's personal friend; and of orchestrating fraud in the 1984 presidential election. These allegations led many people in Panama to protest, resulting in a suspension of constitutional protections and austere measures by the Noriega regime including arrest and detainment of protestors and opposition party leaders, government seizure of local television stations, and tear gassing of students and accused brutality of local citizens with batons, rubber hoses filled with sand, and shotguns filled with rock salt.

Just 50 days after the televised interview, Noriega placed Díaz under house arrest. During that time many people went to Díaz's house to shake his hand in order to show their support for him. The street to his house was frequently lined with the cars of his supporters. Later, the whole Spadafora family would go into hiding at Díaz Herrera's residency, which served as a refuge against Noriega's loyal soldiers, who finally raided the residence on July 27, 1987, to place him in prison. The raid was accomplished with three helicopters and over 100 heavily armed men in an assault orchestrated by Mike Harari, Noriega's personal friend and former Israeli intelligence officer. The raid ended when Díaz-Herrera, who kept more than 30 of his loyal officers in the residence at the time, surrendered and was taken into custody. The invasion of the personal home compound of Diaz occurred between 6:30 and 8:00 a.m. with military helicopters initially circling the barb-wired walls, firing automatic weapons into the home and compound. Tear gas and light armored vehicles were used to breach the walls and raid the compound, with at least one explosive round being used to breach the front gate. While the Panamanian government claimed no one was killed in the raid, local residents reported several badly wounded bodies being removed in the hours after the attack. One body guard of Diaz-Herrera was reportedly killed. Blood trails could be easily seen from the heavily damaged front entrance used to enter the compound. During the raid, Díaz's second wife, Claret Maigualida, and their small children were in the residence.

After spending six months in jail, Díaz was exiled on December 24, after several countries negotiated his release from prison. He was sent to Venezuela where his wife Maigualida and their three children awaited.

=== Years of exile ===
At the beginning of his exile from Panama, Díaz spent about six years in Caracas, Venezuela, during the presidency of Carlos Andres Perez, a personal friend who granted him political asylum. Caracas was also the birthplace of his second wife, Claret Maigualida, with whom he would spend the rest of his life. Later, he spent time in Argentina, travelled throughout Europe, and finally arrived in Ecuador with Maigualida and his children, Daniel Roberto Díaz Herrera, Carlos Guillermo Díaz Herrera (who is currently participating in politics) and Romai Anastacia Díaz de Homes.

=== Later life ===
In 2004, Martín Torrijos, the son of Omar and a second nephew of Roberto Díaz, was elected president of Panama and chose Díaz to serve as ambassador to Perú.

Díaz was the Ambassador of Panama and Consul of Callao in Perú until 2009.

== See also ==
- Operation Just Cause

== Notes ==
1. Inter-American Commission on Human Rights website
