= Havana-Babylon. Prostitution in Cuba =

Essay by Amir Valle

Havana-Babylon. Prostitution in Cuba is an essay by Cuban journalist Amir Valle. The work was published for the first time in 2006 in Spain, under the title Jineteras. Although the Cuban authorities question the development of prostitution on the island, this essay presents its development, particularly since the 1990s. The book is banned in Cuba, but circulates clandestinely. After the publication of the book, Amir Valle was denied entry to Cuba and had to remain living in exile in Berlin, Germany.

== Plot summary ==
Journalist Amir Valle conducted a ten-year investigation to write this essay on prostitution in Cuba. He collected testimonies from hundreds of Cubans: "prostitutes, pimps, dishonest policemen, hoteliers, taxi drivers, brothels, drug traffickers...".

In the chapter entitled The Island of Delights, the author reviews the history of prostitution in Cuba. There he cites his sources such as the work of the Cuban historian Fernando Ortiz Fernández, ecclesiastical documents, studies by Roland H. Wright. He also evokes the deportation of black slaves to the "brothel of America" when Cuba becomes the playground of its neighbor the United States.

After the Cuban Revolution of 1959, the communist regime of Fidel Castro prohibited prostitution, this practice was officially eradicated with the commitment of the president of the Federation of Cuban Women, Vilma Espín, Raúl Castro's wife. But prostitution continues and the authorities tolerate it. It unfolds without control in "a world at night, dark, sinister, sordid, which only obeys its own laws and seems to celebrate a cult of the Marquis de Sade." Amir Valle describes the hidden face of Cuban prostitution: obscene practices requested by many clients, horror by some, pornographic and even eschatological acts.

The practice of prostitution has become common in Cuba. Necessity is law, all strata of the population are affected by this scourge: "workers, peasants, students, housewives." Women are forced to enjoy it, to meet the needs of their families, they live in difficult conditions, often victims of AIDS or rivalry between pimps. However, prostitutes can acquire an envied status in Cuba, earn money and allow those around them to live better. This standard of living, higher than that of university graduates, also allows access to medicines, construction materials that are not found in the usual stores, computer equipment and other vital products inaccessible to the average Cuban. Some even manage to leave Cuba with foreign clients.

After the publication of the book, Amir Valle, while traveling in Spain, was unable to return to Cuba. He settled in Germany in Berlin.

== Critical reception ==
The writer Manuel Vázquez Montalbán recalled a talented writer: "I have read few studies on a social plague written with such literary mastery". For Morgane Bréard of the Mouvement du Nid, Amir Valle "looked at this phenomenon with rigor and humanity". Jennifer Richaud of BibliObs indicates that the author "used his research skills and created a report in the form of a quality book, both in its story and in the unique and frank character of its characters". The journalist Luc Rosenzweig defined it as a "modern and tropical version" of the work The Lower Depths by Maxim Gorki.

== Awards ==
The work received the 2007 Rodolfo Walsh Prize for the best non-fiction work in the Spanish language with the name of Jineteras (Spain, 2006), reissued in 2008 with the title Habana Babilonia. The hidden face of the jineteras.

== See also ==
- Prostitution in Cuba
