= Hugo Spadafora =

Panamanian revolutionary (1940–1985)

- Born: September 6, 1940; Chitré, Herrera, Panama
- Died: September 13, 1985 (aged 45); La Concepción, Chiriquí, Panama
- Cause of death: Murder
- Occupations: Politician, commander of the Victoriano Lorenzo Brigade, physician, Vice-Minister of Health in Omar Torrijos's regime

Hugo Spadafora Franco (September 6, 1940 – September 13, 1985) was a Panamanian physician and guerrilla fighter in Guinea-Bissau and Nicaragua. He criticized the military in Panama, which led to his murder by the government of Manuel Noriega in 1985.

== Biography ==
Born in Chitré, Spadafora was a physician, who graduated from the University of Bologna, in Italy. He served as a combat medic with the independence guerrilla of Guinea-Bissau during the Guinea-Bissau War of Independence. Originally a critic of the military regime headed by Omar Torrijos, he served as its Vice-Minister of Health. In 1978, he organized the Victoriano Lorenzo Brigade, formed by a group of up to 1,200 Panamanian fighters to combat the Anastasio Somoza Debayle regime in Nicaragua.

Concerned about the increased Soviet and Cuban influence in the Sandinista regime of Nicaragua and the delay of free elections, Spadafora joined the Sandino Revolutionary Front (FRS) alongside Edén Pastora ("Comandante Cero"), hero of the August 1978 seizure of the National Palace in Nicaragua. The rise of Manuel Noriega as authoritarian ruler of Panama compelled Spadafora to denounce Noriega's protection of drug trafficking. Spadafora was detained by Noriega's forces when entering Panama from Costa Rica in September 1985, and his decapitated body was later found stuffed in a post office bag. The autopsy later found Spadafora's stomach full of the blood he had ingested during the slow severing of his head. He had also endured hours of severe torture, as is quoted in Gary Webb's Dark Alliance: "His body bore evidence of unimaginable tortures. The thigh muscles had been neatly sliced so he could not close his legs, and then something had been jammed up his rectum, tearing it apart. His testicles were swollen horribly, the result of prolonged garroting, his ribs were broken, and then, while he was still alive, his head had been sawed off with a butcher's knife." His head was never found. President Nicolás Ardito Barletta tried to set up a commission to investigate the murder but was forced to resign by Noriega, which increased suspicions that the military had ordered the beheading.

The brutality of the murder shocked many and it was a contributing factor to the deterioration of relations between the US and Noriega. Four years after the murder, the US under president George H. W. Bush overthrew Noriega by invading Panama in 1989.

It was not until the administration of President Guillermo Endara in 1989, that a court found Noriega (in absentia) and other followers guilty of a conspiracy to murder Spadafora.

In 2013, his biography Hugo Spadafora: Bajo la Piel del Hombre was published by Amir Valle, a Cuban journalist, literary critic and writer exiled in Germany.
