= Amir Valle =

Cuban journalist and writer

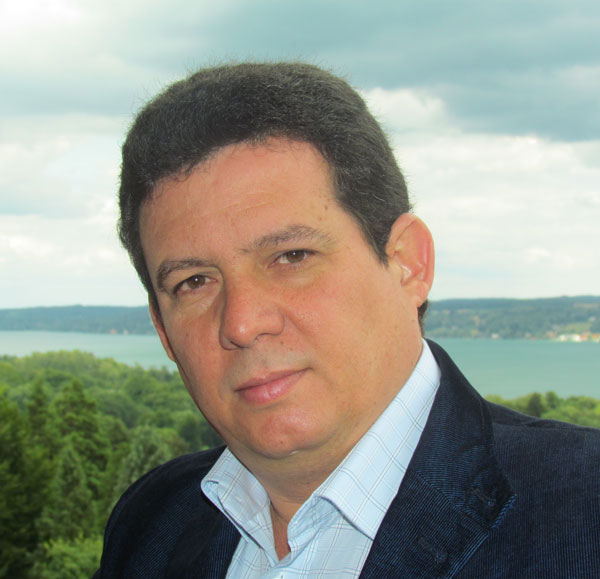
- Amir Valle in 2012
- Born: Amir Valle Ojeda; January 6, 1967 (age 59); Guantánamo, Cuba
- Citizenship: Cuban; German
- Education: University of Havana
- Occupations: Journalist and writer
- Children: 2
- Writing career
- Language: Spanish
- Period: 1989–present
- Genres: Crime fiction; thriller; journalism
- Notable works: Las puertas de la noche; Si Cristo te desnuda; Habana-Babilonia; La Habana: Puerta de las Américas
- Website: amirvalle.com

Amir Valle Ojeda (born January 6, 1967), is a Cuban journalist, literary critic and writer. In the aftermath of his criticism of the Fidel Castro regime, he was prevented from returning to Cuba in 2006. He then decided to settle in Berlin, where he continued his professional activities.

== Biography ==
Amir Valle was born on January 6, 1967, in Guantánamo and spent his childhood in Santiago de Cuba. He entered the journalism faculty first in Santiago de Cuba and then in Havana. After graduating as a journalist, he participated for three years in the "social service" imposed by the Cuban authorities on young university graduates. In 1989 he began to work as a journalist and literary critic.

Valle's work describes the hidden social aspects of Cuba, hidden by government authorities. He notably acquired international recognition with his series of detective novels set in Havana. In his thrillers, detective Alain Bec discovers child trafficking in Las puertas de la noche or the world of drugs and prostitution in Si Cristo te desnuda. Amir Valle has also published several essays, including Jineteras (translated as Hookers - Havana Babylon), a study on prostitution in Cuba. His regular criticism of Fidel Castro's regime resulted in Valle being prevented from returning to Cuba in 2006 after a trip to Spain. Forced to stay in exile, he decided to settle in Berlin, Germany. He was sponsored by the international PEN club, an NGO that helps writers.

When Valle's family also did not receive permission for his 5-year-old son to move to Europe with his parents, Valle turned to Gabriel García Márquez and José Saramago, who were friends of Cuban revolutionary leader Fidel Castro. A week later, the Cuban authorities issued the exit permit and Valle's son was able to leave Cuba in July 2006. That same summer, Castro referred to the disgraced writer Valle in a television program as "jineterologo" (creation of a derogatory word intended to designate a prostitute expert, something like "nutologist"). A year later, Valle's eldest son, who was 18 years old, was also able to leave Cuba.

In Berlin Valle continues his investigative journalism activities, he also works as a trainer, consultant, "advisor and political analyst at the German Ministry of Foreign Affairs and the Deutsche Welle News Agency", Germany's international broadcasting service. Amir Valle creates and directs the Latin American cultural magazine OtroLunes - Revista Hispanoamericana de Cultura.

== Awards ==
- 2007 Rodolfo Walsh Prize for the best non-fiction work in the Spanish language for Jineteras (Spain, 2006), reissued in 2008 under the title Habana Babilonia. La cara oculta de las jineteras.
- NOVELPOL 2006 award for best Spanish thriller and 2008 Carmona crime novel award for Santuario de sombras published in 2006.
- Prize for the novel Vargas Llosa 2006 for the novel Las palabras y los muertos.

== Bibliography ==
=== Fiction ===
- Tiempo en cueros (short stories, 1988)
- Yo soy el malo (short stories, 1989)
- La danza alucinada del suicida (short stories, 1999)
- El ojo de la noche. Antología del cuento femenino (1999)
- Manuscritos del muerto (short stories, 2000)
- Las puertas de la noche (novel, 2001, 2002)
- Muchacha azul bajo la lluvia (novel, 2001, 2008)
- Si Cristo te desnuda (novel, 2001, 2002)
- Entre el miedo y las sombras (novel, 2004)
- Los desnudos de Dios (novel, 2004)
- Die Türen der Nacht (Las puertas de la noche) (novel, 2005)
- Últimas noticias del infierno (novel, 2005)
- Santuario de sombras (novel, 2006)
- Wenn Christo dich enkleidet (If Christ undresses you) (novel, 2006)
- Die Haut und Die Nackten (The naked of God) (novel, 2006)
- Las palabras y los muertos (novel, 2007) Mario Vargas Llosa International Novel Prize
- Zwischen Angst und Schatten (Between fear and shadows) (novel, 2007)
- Die Wörter und die Toten (The Words and the Dead) (novel, 2007)
- Tatuajes (novel, 2007)
- Freistatt der Schatten (Sanctuary of shadows) (novel, 2007)
- Largas noches con Flavia (novel, 2008)
- La nostalgia es un tango de Gardel/Nostalgia is a tango of Gardel (short stories, 2008)
- Lust (Die Haut und Die Nackten) (La piel y los desnudos) (Second Edition, Novel, 2009)
- Las raíces del odio (Roots of hate) (Novel, 2012)
- Non lasciar mai che ti vedano piangere (Never let them see you mourn)(Novel, Italy, 2012)
- Hugo Spadafora. Bajo la piel del hombre (Under the skin of man) (novel, 2013)
- Nunca dejes que te vean llorar (Never let them see you mourn) (novel, 2015)
- Nostalgias, ironías y otras alucinaciones (Nostalgia, ironies and other hallucinations) (short stories, 2018)
- Los nudos invisibles (The invisible knots) (novel, 2021)

=== Essay ===
- Quiénes narran en Cienfuegos (1993)
- Ese universo de la soledad americana (1998)
- Brevísimas demencias. La narrativa cubana de los 90 (2001)
- Palabras amordazadas. Censura en Cuba / Gagged. Censorship in Cuba (Bilingual Spanish/English edition, 2016)
- La estrategia del verdugo. Breve panorama de la censura cultural en Cuba (The executioner's strategy. A brief overview of cultural censorship in Cuba) (2020)

=== Non-fiction ===
- En el nombre de Dios (1990)
- Con Dios en el camino (1999)
- Jineteras (2006) Rodolfo Walsh International Award for the best non-fiction book in the Spanish language.
- Habana Babilonia. La cara oculta de las jineteras (2008)
- Habana Babilonia. Prostitution in Kuba. Zeugnisse (Testimonial literature, 2008)
- La Habana. Puerta de las Américas (Fictional historical essay, 2009)
- La Havane Babylone (Testimonial literature, 2010).
- Hugo Spadafora: Bajo la Piel del Hombre (Testimonial literature, 2013).
- Havana Babylonia or Prostitutes in Cuba (Testimonial literature, 2017)

=== Christian literature ===
- El verdadero rostro de Dios. Cómo vivir en Cristo en un país extranjero (The true face of God. How to live in Christ in a foreign country) (Essay, 2015)
