= Military ranks of Panama =

The Military ranks of Panama are the ranks used by the Panamanian Public Forces, which have some warfare capabilities. Panama abolished its army in 1990, which was confirmed by a unanimous parliamentary vote for constitutional change in 1994.

== Current paramilitary ranks ==
=== Commissioned officer ranks ===
The rank insignia for commissioned officers.

Rank group	General / flag officers		Senior officers			Junior officers
(Panama) Panamanian National Police
(Panama) Panamanian National Police	Comisionado Mayor	Subcomisionado Mayor	Comisionado	Subcomisionado	Mayor	Capitán	Teniente	Subteniente
(Panama) National Aeronaval Service
(Panama) National Aeronaval Service	Director General	Subdirector General	Comisionado	Subcomisionado	Mayor	Capitán	Teniente	Subteniente
(Panama) National Border Service
(Panama) National Border Service	Director General	Subdirector General	Comisionado	Subcomisionado	Mayor	Capitán	Teniente	Subteniente
Rank group	General / flag officers		Senior officers			Junior officers

=== Other ranks ===
The rank insignia for non-commissioned officers enlisted personnel.

Rank group	Senior NCOs		Junior NCOs		Enlisted
(Panama) Panamanian National Police					No insignia
(Panama) Panamanian National Police	Sargento primero	Sargento segundo	Cabo primero	Cabo segundo	Agente
(Panama) National Aeronaval Service					No insignia
(Panama) National Aeronaval Service	Sargento primero	Sargento segundo	Cabo primero	Cabo segundo	Agente
(Panama) National Border Service					No insignia
(Panama) National Border Service	Sargento primero	Sargento segundo	Cabo primero	Cabo segundo	Agente
Rank group	Senior NCOs		Junior NCOs		Enlisted

== Historic ranks ==
Between 1968 and 1989, the Panama Defense Forces used these military ranks.

=== Commissioned officer ranks ===
The rank insignia for Commissioned officers.

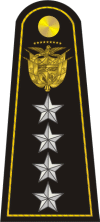
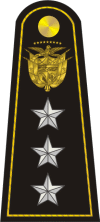
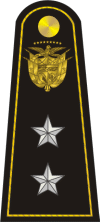
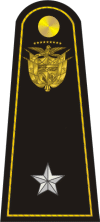
Rank group	General / flag officers					Senior officers			Junior officers
Panama Defense Forces
Panama Defense Forces	General de fuerzas	General de ejército	General de cuerpo	General de división	General de brigada	Coronel	Teniente coronel	Mayor	Capitán	Teniente	Subteniente

=== Other ranks ===
The rank insignia for Non-commissioned officers and enlisted personnel.

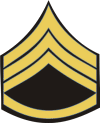
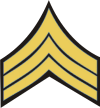
Rank group	Senior NCOs		Junior NCOs		Enlisted
Panama Defense Forces					No insignia
Panama Defense Forces	Sargento de primera	Sargento de segunda	Cabo primero	Cabo segundo	Soldado raso
Rank group	Senior NCOs		Junior NCOs		Enlisted
