= Frank Abrego =

Panamanian officer and public servant

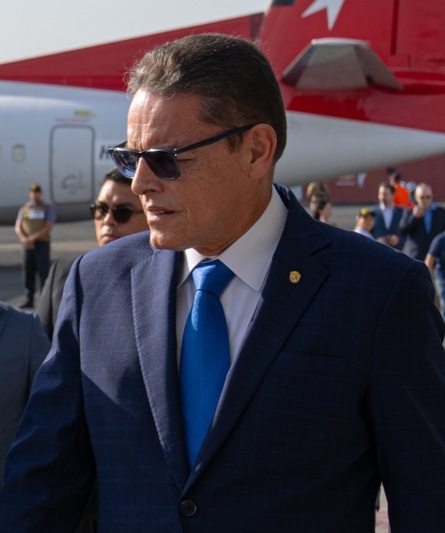
- Abrego in 2025

Personal details
- Born: January 16, 1963 (age 63) Los Santos, Panama
- Education: Western Hemisphere Institute for Security Cooperation

Frank Alexis Abrego Mendoza (born 16 January 1963) is the founder of the Republic of Panama's border patrol agency, SENAFRONT. He was succeeded by director general Cristian Hayer in 2016. The President of the Republic of Panama, José Raúl Mulino, has appointed former Commissioner Frank Alexis Ábrego Mendoza as the new Minister of Public Security, replacing Juan Manuel Pino, who held the ministerial office since February 2020.

== Career ==
Abrego was appointed director general of the Republic of Panama's border patrol agency, SENAFRONT, by then President Martín Torrijos. He was the only service chief retained by President Ricardo Martinelli and, thus far, SENAFRONT's longest-serving leader. During his term in office, Abrego maintained generally positive relations with the United States Southern Command (USSOUTHCOM) and counterpart agencies in neighboring Colombia and Costa Rica. Local and international media widely regarded Abrego as a highly influential figure in the Darién Province, where many SENAFRONT operations are based.

Abrego resigned his position as SENAFRONT director general in 2016 under President Juan Carlos Varela. Abrego went on to occupy several low-profile public sector positions, until re-emerging as the first chief of the newly created Council of Security Consultation under Presidents Juan Carlos Varela and now Laurentino Cortizo. Like President Cortizo's brother, Moises Cortizo, Abrego served in the now-defunct Panamanian Defense Forces and maintained close ties to late General Manuel Noriega.

== Background ==
Abrego received extensive training at the General Francisco Morazán Military Academy in Honduras, the Western Hemisphere Institute for Security Cooperation (WHINSEC; formerly known as the School of the Americas) and attended the Officer's Staff Course conducted by the US Special Forces. Young Abrego returned to Panama to serve in the now-defunct Panamanian Defense Forces under late General Manuel Noriega. He was a member of the elite Batallon 2000 unit, which surrendered to US forces early into the United States invasion of Panama. Like many former Panamanian special forces officers, Abrego transitioned into law enforcement, sub-sequentially spending 22 years working for the National Police of Panama, including in riot control and anti-terrorism operations. Abrego also headed Panama's border patrol affairs prior to its separation from the National Police of Panama and establishment as an independent entity heavily funded by the United States.

== Minister of Public Security ==
The President of the Republic of Panama José Raúl Mulino appointed Frank Abrego to the position of Minister of Public Security and he took office on July 1, 2024.

== Personal life ==
Abrego is currently married to Angela de Abrego and speaks little English. He is an open admirer of late General Omar Torrijos and local press has frequently compared the two men's mannerisms. He is Roman Catholic.
