= McFaul =

McFaul or Macfaull is a surname. Notable people with the surname include:

- Charles Macfaull (1800–1846), early settler in Western Australia
- Donald L. McFaul (1957–1989), United States Navy SEAL killed in action in Panama
- Iam "Willie" McFaul (1943–2025), Northern Irish football player and coach
- Michael McFaul (born 1963), American academic and diplomat
- Shane McFaul (born 1986), Irish football player

== See also ==
- McFall
- USS McFaul, an Arleigh Burke-class destroyer of the United States Navy, named for Donald McFaul
