= Marcos Justine =

Panamanian military officer

Chief of the General Staff
- In office April 1987 - 20 December 1989
- President: Manuel Noriega
- Preceded by: Roberto Díaz Herrera
- Succeeded by: Office abolished

Personal details
- Born: Marcos Justine Fernández; 1934
- Died: 6 June 2017 (aged 83) Panama City, Panama
- Education: Chorrillos Military School; School of the Americas

Military service
- Allegiance: Panama
- Branch/service: Panama Defense Forces
- Rank: Colonel
- Commands: Panama Defense Forces
- Battles/wars: Invasion of Panama

Marcos Justine Fernández (1934 – 7 June 2017) was a Panamanian military officer who was the last Chief of the General Staff of the Panama Defense Forces under dictator Manuel Noriega before its dismantling following the United States invasion of Panama in 1989.

Before his time in the Defense Forces, he was the head of National Police of Panama City and head of the Veraguas police zone.

Following the invasion Justine was arrested and accused of embezzling $20 million from the National Bank of Panama during the dictatorship. He received a presidential pardon in 1996 and was released.

He suffered pneumonia and died on 6 June 2017 aged 83 at the Hospital Nacional in Panama City.
