= Panama Defense Forces =

Armed forces of Panama from 1983 to 1989

- Fuerzas de Defensa de Panamá
- Emblem

- Cap badge
- Motto: Todo por la patria (All for the homeland)
- Founded: 1953
- Current form: 1983
- Disbanded: 1990
- Service branches: Army; Air Force; Navy; Police; Special Forces
- Headquarters: El Chorrillo

Leadership
- Commander-in-Chief: Manuel Noriega
- Chief of staff: Colonel Marcos Justine

Personnel
- Active personnel: 16,300

Related articles
- History: Wars and Battles: Cuban invasion of Panama; 1968 Panamanian coup d'état; Insurgency in Chiriquí; Nicaraguan Revolution; 1989 Panamanian coup attempt; US invasion of Panamá
- Ranks: Military ranks of Panama

The Panama Defense Forces (PDF; Spanish: Fuerzas de Defensa de Panamá, FFDD), formerly the National Guard of Panama (Spanish: Guardia Nacional de Panamá), were the armed forces of the Republic of Panama.

It was created in 1983, led by Panama's dictator General Manuel Noriega and his general staff. It was dismantled by the United States Armed Forces after the United States invasion of Panama in 1989.

== History ==
Before the coup d'état in Panama of 1968 that overthrew President Arnulfo Arias Madrid, the military police were called National Guard. Since the 1950s and under the command of Colonel and President José Antonio Remón Cantera. He negotiated with the U.S. president Dwight D. Eisenhower issues of sovereignty and defense of the Panama Canal, obtaining important equipment for the police and the National Guard, as well as the training of pilots in Colombia and military officers in the United States Military Academy. In 1964, the National Guard of Panama avoided having a conflict with the Armed Forces of the United States on Martyrs Day, staying quartered.

In 1968, after the triumph of Arnulfo Arias in the elections and a few days after the swearing in of the same, there was a meeting between Arias and the high officers of the National Guard, General Vallarino, Colonels Pinilla and Urrutia and Lieutenant Colonel Torrijos, to agree on Vallarino's retirement, in return Arias would respect the law of the ladder.

President Arnulfo Arias Madrid assumed on October 1, 1968, on October 10, the retirement ceremony of General Bolívar Vallarino, outgoing commander of the National Guard and unexpectedly the forced retirement of Colonel José María Pinilla Fábrega incoming commander, was held appointed Colonel Bolívar Urrutia as commander in chief and Lieutenant Colonel Aristides Hassán, second commander in chief of the National Guard, as well as a series of abrupt changes and transfers which violated the law of the ranks and the agreement reached between President Arias and the high command of the National Guard. In response to this, on October 11, Major Boris Martínez, head of the Chiriquí military zone and Lieutenant Colonel Omar Torrijos Herrera, who until now served as Executive Secretary of the National Guard command commanded the military coup against President Arias Madrid, the coup leaders offered the presidency to Ricardo J. Alfaro and Raúl Arango, who at the time of the coup was the vice president of the republic and commander of the Benemérito Fire Corps of Panama who declined the offer of the military, Therefore, they decided to create the Government Military Board, which was headed by Colonels José María Pinilla and Bolívar Urrutia.

All liberties and political rights of Panamanian citizenship were abolished, the 1946 Constitution was repealed and major transformations of political and social order in the Panamanian nation were initiated. During this time there were guerrilla movements in the city and in the interior of the country by the Panamanian left and the supporters of the ousted President Arias Madrid. There were also acts of war and sabotage against the government and the National Guard, freedom of expression was strongly censored by closing newspapers. The issuance of pamphlets and clandestine writings was developed. On February 24, 1969, Colonel Torrijos with a group of officers who supported in a maneuver as part of the intestine fights stun Colonel Boris Martínez and sent him on a plane to Miami as a military attache which he rejected and never had ties with the military staying to live there as an asylee.

By December 1969, while General Omar Torrijos already attended an equestrian competition which his friend Fernando Eleta Almarán had invited his friend, a conspiracy composed of Colonels José María Pinilla, Bolívar Urrutia, Amado Sanjur, they tried to overthrow him, but Torrijos was supported by the then Major Manuel Antonio Noriega who served as head of the Chiriquí military zone, receiving him on the night of December 16, 1969, this day is called Loyalty Day, once Torrijos entered Chiriquí the caravan of military and civilians who supported him grew as he went along from Chiriquí, to the presidency of the republic which defeated all coup attempts, definitively consolidating Torrijos in power. The National Guard crushed all opposition movements towards 1970.

After crushing the opposition movements, the already general Omar Torrijos Herrera took control and established in 1972 a National Assembly of Representatives, who immediately named him "Chief of State of the Panamanian Revolution." This military body established a system of nationalist vindication, to which part of the private sector joined, and the country went through a period of social and cultural transformations, with the recovery of the Panama Canal as the main objective of Torrijos, and the creation of the ruling party, Democratic Revolutionary Party (PRD). At the same time, harmful and denounced characteristics were evidenced, such as armed repression, censorship of the printed press and the disappearance of political opponents at the beginning of said government. The Torrijos-Carter Treaties signed in 1977, demanded from the regime (called "the process" by its militants) democratization, its quartering and the call for elections.

By 1978, General Torrijos abandoned power, but maintained control of the National Guard. After his death in a strange plane crash on July 31, 1981, – where the main suspect was the U.S. Central Intelligence Agency (CIA) for not complying with the requirements of the World Bank – the National Guard was involved in a power struggle between the military commanders involved. Colonel Florencio Flores took possession of the position of commander in chief for a few months, until after a conspiracy among senior officials of the General Staff they overthrow him by sending him to retirement. Given this, the conspiracy officers create a succession agreement to the command known as the Torrijos plan in which the first to ascend to the command would be Lieutenant Colonel Rubén Darío Paredes, then Lieutenant Colonel Armando Contreras will follow, Lieutenant Colonel Manuel Antonio Noriega would follow and culminate with Lieutenant Colonel Roberto Díaz Herrera, the self-proclaimed General Rubén Darío Paredes Del Río decided with his staff to carry out certain repressive actions against the media opposing the regime censuring some media. In a maneuver for power General Paredes retires Colonel Armando Contreras who had already reached the time to ascend to the command, maintaining links in front of the command until 1983.

On August 20, 1983, Colonel Noriega was promoted to general and the National Guard Command and began a period marked by dictatorial decisions. His first decree was the change of the name of the military entity to the Defense Forces of Panama, with the mentality of converting the military police into an army for the joint tasks of the defense of the Panama Canal along with the United States Army (USA). For the reorganization of the military institution, he had the military advice of Israeli intelligence experts and reputed military officers, among them the Argentine Colonel Mohamed Ali Seineldín, veteran of the Falklands War and, at that time, military attaché of the Republic Argentina in Panama.

That year the closure of the School of the Americas was ordered, which for the CIA meant losing its base in Central America. At the end of 1983 the political strategies were prepared to launch the official candidate of the 1984 elections: Colonel Noriega convinces General Paredes to benefit from his retirement and receive the support of the State and the Defense Forces to aspire to the presidency. Then, Paredes is betrayed, since the Comandancia and the PRD launch at the last moment Dr. Nicolás Ardito Barletta as the official candidate. Once orchestrated the electoral fraud by presidential decree, Noriega is promoted to General.

=== Military coup of October 3, 1989 ===
On October 3, 1989, a military coup was planned, in which some officers, under the command of Lt. Col. Moisés Giroldi Vera, tried to overthrow General Noriega. Although they successfully captured Noriega, a loyalist counter-attack forced the officers to surrender. They were later tortured and killed. Giroldi and his subordinates intended to end the economic embargo imposed by the United States, and negotiate with the U.S. military a political solution to a war action and create a commission to review the outcome of the 1989 elections, which were cancelled to deliver the presidency to the true winner, in this case to the political party ADO Civilista, headed by Guillermo Endara, Ricardo Arias Calderón and Guillermo Ford. This would mean withdrawing General Noriega and his entire staff, as some of colonels had been in retirement for more than 12 years and were still in their positions, earning high salaries, in contrast to the troops that failed to collect more than $250 per month.

In order to clean the deteriorated image of the Defense Forces, it was decided to withdraw Noriega, but they did not count on the general already having counterattack plans when changing power. The events led to terrorist actions, such as the cyanide contamination of the Chilibre water treatment plant, and then blamed the Americans for such action. Against this plan were Lieutenant Colonel Moisés Giroldi Vera and his followers, who obviously rejected him.

Moisés Giroldi was captured along with 400 other police and coup soldiers and sent to Fuerte Cimarrón, the basic military training school in Panama, and then sent to the Tinajitas Prison and Coiba, where many were tortured and subsequently executed. General Manuel Antonio Noriega then ordered all the barracks to deliver any weapons of heavy caliber, which were stored in containers under the custody of the G-2 under the command of Colonel Luis Córdoba.

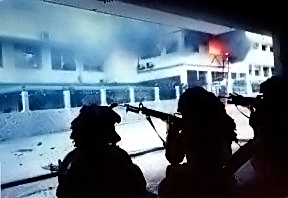
American Rangers during the attack on the Panama Defense Forces Command.

=== Post-invasion democratic government ===
When the Defense Forces were dismantled, the government of Guillermo Endara (1989–1994) was commissioned to form a new institution with the help of the U.S. Army. The force, initially a police vocation, was attached to the Public Force, idealized by the then Vice President Ricardo Arias Calderón.

The new government organized it as a police force of the Panamanian state, subordinated to the executive branch; calling it National Police with the explicit purpose of providing protection to the life, honor and property of nationals wherever they are and of foreigners under the jurisdiction of their territory. Colonel Roberto Armijo was appointed as the first head of this police force.

In order to grant legal bases to the new police organization, Executive Decree No. 38 of February 10, 1990 was issued, through which the Public Force was organized, one of whose components is the National Police. The Executive appointed Colonel Eduardo Herrera Hassan as Director of that Force. Herrera Hassán was then dismissed on charges of conspiracy in August, being replaced Lieutenant Colonel Fernando Quezada, who in turn was dismissed in October of the same year, by opening a public discussion with the director of a newspaper. Hassán attempted a coup d'état on December 5, 1990, giving his reason as a final consequence to the level of senior officers in the institution.

== Structure ==
=== Panamanian Army ===
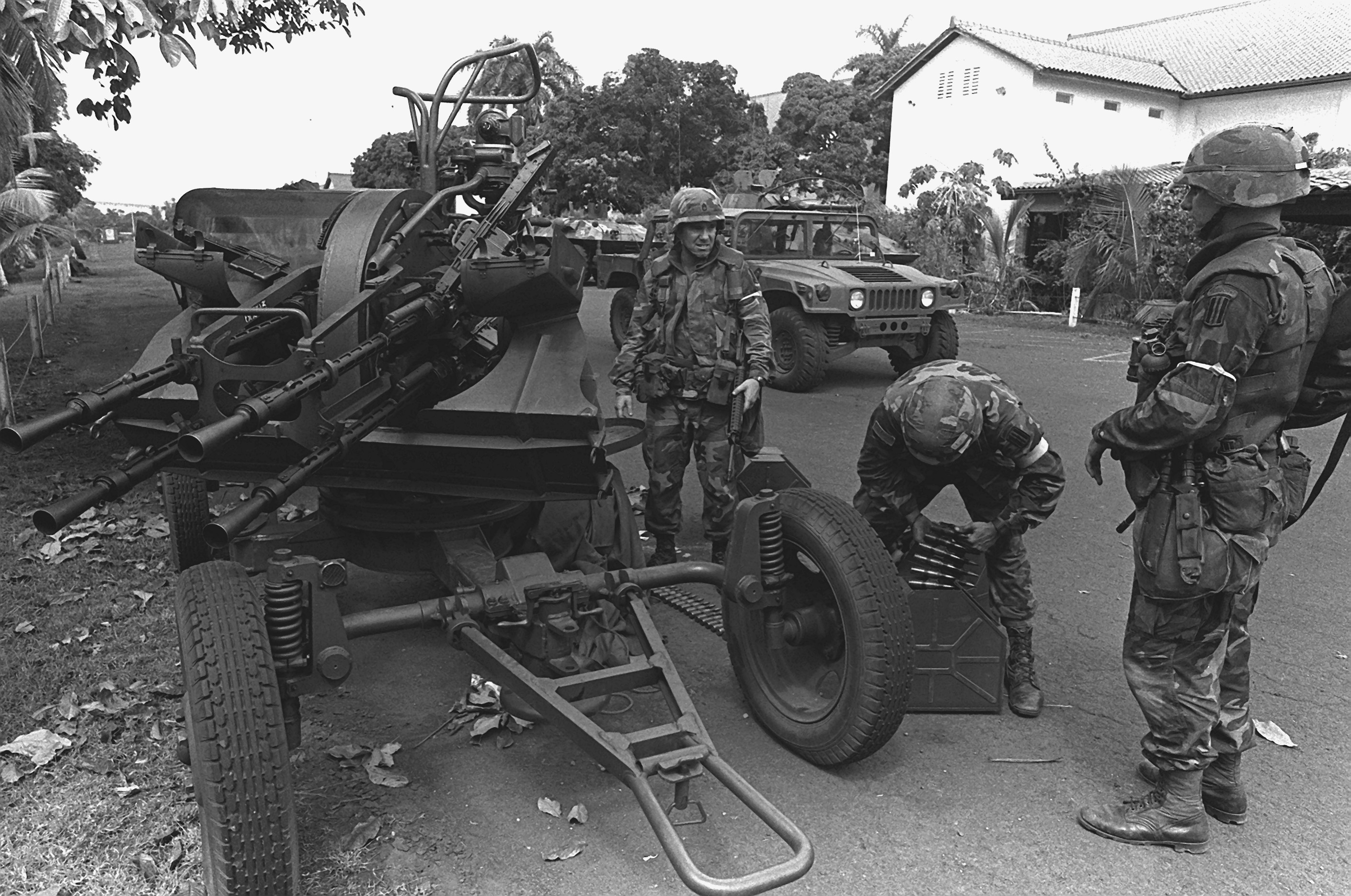
U.S. Army 5th Infantry Division (mechanized) soldiers inspecting a Soviet-made ZPU-4 which was abandoned by Panama Defense Forces.

As an army corps, members of the Land Forces considered themselves as police and soldiers at the same time. Until 1989 there were a total of 16,300 troops and about 3800 reservists and civil collaborators called the Dignity Battalions, trained to resist the possible invasion of a foreign country.

The Panama Defense Forces had four battalions and eight infantry companies, plus special forces units. The country was divided into twelve military zones, which were generally led by a major or a lieutenant colonel. Each military zone had one or two reaction squads.

As weapons, the infantry had fifty light cannons, eight hundred heavy mortars and one thousand light mortars; Fifty KPV 14.5 x 114 Russian anti-aircraft machine guns (known as "4 Mouths"), armored vehicles V150 and V300. The infantry was armed with Russian AK-47 and AKM rifles and rocket-propelled grenade launchers RPG-2, RPG-7 and RPG-18, in addition to U.S. weapons such as the M16-A1, M-60 machine guns and .45 caliber service pistols.

=== Notable units ===
The following are notable units of the PDF:

==== Battalions ====
The PDF's four battalions consisted of 600 to 700 men. A fifth battalion, "Atlantica", based around 8th Infantry/Military Police Company, was planned but never formed.

- Battalion 2000 (Prov. de Panamá ) – based at Fort Cimarron and had three line companies; "Eagle", "Fury", and "Mechanized" (with AFV's) plus Fire Support Company. Bn 2000 also had two attached units, 1st Infantry and Fire Support Company "Tiger" and 2nd Infantry Airborne Company "Puma" which was the nationwide rapid reaction force.
- Cémaco Battalion (Prov. del Darién ) – located at Las Palmas and consisted only of 1st Mountain Company was to secure the Panama-Columbia Border,
- 2e Paz Battalion (Prov. de Chiriquí ) – The 2nd Peace Battalion was based in 5th Military Zone and tasked with protecting the Panama-Costa Rica Border. It consisted of a Command Company, and Air Assault Companies A "Fortuna" and B "Copal"
- Military Police Battalion "Victoriano Lorenzo" – Infantry crossed trained as Military Police, consisted of the 5th (Ft Amador) and 8th (Ft Espinar) Infantry Companies

==== Numbered Companies ====
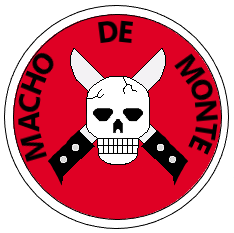
Emblem of the 7th Macho de Monte Infantry Company.

- First Tigres de Tinajita Infantry and Fire Support Company
- Second Pumas de Tocumen Infantry Company – Airborne forces Company
- Third Red Devils Infantry Company of Chiriquí – Support for the Paz Battalion
- Fourth Infantry Company Urraca – Custody of the General Staff
- Fifth Victoriano Lorenzo Infantry Company – Custodiar Canal Security
- Sixth Mechanized Expeditionary Infantry Company – Mechanized Infantry Company
- Seventh Macho de Monte Infantry Company – Commander Escort and Guerrilla warfare Company
- Eighth Military Police Company

=== Support units ===
- Civic action – military engineering works section, composed of reservists.
- CODEPADI (Commission for the Defense of Homeland and Dignity) – Civil Protection Corps, created to assist in the event of a foreign military invasion of Panama. Formed primarily by personnel of the civil service and led by officials of state agencies.
- Commando Unit – Unidad de Commandoes containing two Tactical Operations Groups all located at Fort Espinar.
- Dignity Battalions – Popular militia created in 1988, in accordance with the constitutional precept that states that: "All Panamanians are required to take up arms to defend national independence and territorial integrity of the State" (Art.310), formed by volunteers of all social classes, in order to collaborate in the national defense before the imminence of a foreign military invasion of Panama, a fact that arose in December 1989. Consisted of 11 organized and seven paper battalions consisting of 25 to 250 volunteers.
- G-2 Intelligence and Counterintelligence Section. Directed by Colonels Wong, Purcell and Luis "Papo" Córdoba in 1989.
- Mounted Unit – a company size horse cavalry unit whose primary duty was as a presidential escort, maintained several dozen horses.
- UESAT (Unidad Especial de Seguidad Antiterror) – Special Anti-Terror Security Units, one of which was a 70 counterterrorism and hostage rescue force and the other was a platoon sized bodyguard for Noriega. Originally based out of Flamenco Island near Fort Amador, moved to Panama Viejo by Noriega after the October 1989 coup.

=== Police Force ===
The green uniformed Police Force (Fuerza Policia) was the national law enforcement force providing police and highway patrol duties nationwide. The around 5,000 police personnel were under the jurisdiction of the PDF. The following two "Public Order" companies were formed; 1st Centurions, disbanded after the October coup attempt for not supporting Noriega, and 2nd Doberman, who helped defend the "La Comandancia". Other components of the FP were the Transit Police and the Highway patrol.

The DENI (Departmento de Nacionalde Investigationes) was both a criminal police and secret police maintaining a large network of informers throughout the population and government, and possibly US Forces in Panama. During the 1989 US invasion DENI was led by Nivaldo Madriñán.

The National Guard continued to exist but as an umbrella agency under the PF containing the Presidential Guard, Penitentiary Guard, Port Guard, and Forestry Guard.

=== Special Forces Group ===
The Special Forces Group (Grupo de Operaciones Especiales) consisted of the Command Unit, the Commando Frogmen Unit, the Counterintelligence Unit, the Explosive Ordnance Disposal (EOD) Unit, the School of Commandos and Special Operations (ECOE), the Special Forces Unit, and the UESAT (Special Counter-Terrorism Unit).

=== Panamanian Air Force ===
Roundel

The Panamanian Air Force (Fuerza Aerea Panamena, FAP), also known as "Los Gallinazos", was founded on 17 January 1969 and its motto was Desde el Aire, Orden Paz y Lealtad (From the Air, Order Peace and Loyalty). It was headquartered in Tocumen and had bases at Curundú, David, Paitilla and Santiago. It was composed of a squad of helicopters and a squad of fixed-wing aircraft. The helicopter squad was composed of 22 helicopters that were mostly Huey or UH-1N type armed with M60 machine guns and an AS 332 Super Puma Eurocopter. The fixed-wing squadron was composed of 38 aircraft T-35 Pillán, Cessna, Twin Otter, CASA CN-235, called by the FAP in codename "Elektra", used for paratrooper and infantry forces, CASA C-212 Aviocar, Cessna 208 Caravan and a Boeing 727. It had around 500 personnel.

=== National Naval Force ===
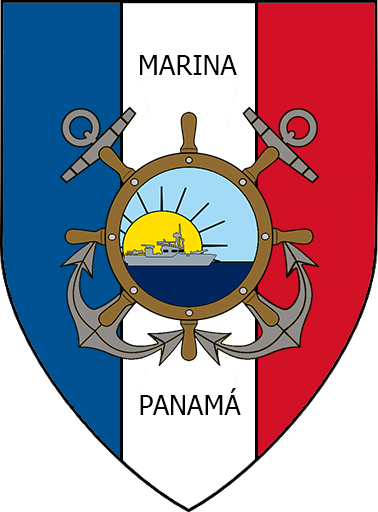
Naval badge

The National Naval Force (Fuerza de Marina Nacional, FMN) was composed of a small group of patrollers and landing units. It also had a Marine Corps Company. It was founded on 17 January 1969 and its motto was "Con Bien Viento y Buena Mar" (By good wind and good sea). Its headquarters was Fort Amador. It had two fleets, an Atlantic fleet based at Coco Solo and a Pacific fleet based at the Port of Balboa. It had smaller bases at Cocos Island, Colón Island and Pedregal. It had around 500 personal and operated 8 landing craft, 2 logistics support ships made from converted landing craft, and a single troop transport.

== Ranks ==
=== Commissioned officer ranks ===
The rank insignia for Commissioned officers.

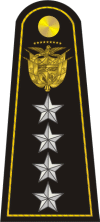
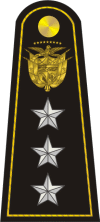
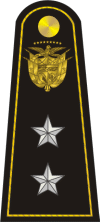
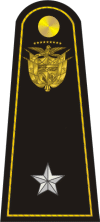
Rank group	General / flag officers					Senior officers			Junior officers
Panama Defense Forces
Panama Defense Forces	General de fuerzas	General de ejército	General de cuerpo	General de división	General de brigada	Coronel	Teniente coronel	Mayor	Capitán	Teniente	Subteniente

=== Other ranks ===
The rank insignia for Non-commissioned officers and enlisted personnel.

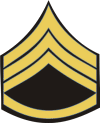
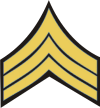
Rank group	Senior NCOs		Junior NCOs		Enlisted
Panama Defense Forces					No insignia
Panama Defense Forces	Sargento de primera	Sargento de segunda	Cabo primero	Cabo segundo	Soldado raso
Rank group	Senior NCOs		Junior NCOs		Enlisted

== Military regions ==
The Panama Defense Forces were organized by military regions which were further divided into military zones. In total there were 4 military regions and 12 military zones.

Map of the Provinces and Regions of Panama in 1983

Military Region	Provinces	Military Zone	Provinces
First Military Region	Panamá Province; Panamá Oeste Province; Colón Province; San Miguelito District	1st Military Zone	Panamá Province
First Military Region	Panamá Province; Panamá Oeste Province; Colón Province; San Miguelito District	2nd Military Zone	Colón Province
First Military Region	Panamá Province; Panamá Oeste Province; Colón Province; San Miguelito District	10th Military Zone	Panamá Oeste Province
First Military Region	Panamá Province; Panamá Oeste Province; Colón Province; San Miguelito District	11th Military Zone	San Miguelito District
Second Military Region	Darién Province; San Blas Region	9th Military Zone	Darién Province
Second Military Region	Darién Province; San Blas Region	12th Military Zone	San Blas Region
Third Military Region	Veraguas Province; Coclé Province; Herrera Province; Los Santos Province	3rd Military Zone	Veraguas Province
Third Military Region	Veraguas Province; Coclé Province; Herrera Province; Los Santos Province	4th Military Zone	Herrera Province
Third Military Region	Veraguas Province; Coclé Province; Herrera Province; Los Santos Province	6th Military Zone	Coclé Province
Third Military Region	Veraguas Province; Coclé Province; Herrera Province; Los Santos Province	7th Military Zone	Los Santos Province
Fourth Military Region	Chiriquí Province; Bocas del Toro Province	5th Military Zone	Chiriquí Province
Fourth Military Region	Chiriquí Province; Bocas del Toro Province	8th Military Zone	Bocas del Toro Province

== Equipment ==
=== Small arms ===
Name	Origin	Type	Quantity	Photo	Notes
Handguns
Browning Hi-Power	Belgium	Semi-automatic pistol	Unknown		FN origin
Colt M1911A1	United States	Semi-automatic pistol	227 before 1975		US Origin, Foreign Military Sales and Military Assistance Program.
S&W Model 10-2	United States	Revolver	Unknown, 218 by 1977		Service revolver for Panamanian Police Force.
Colt .38 Special Revolver	United States	Revolver	Unknown		
Carbines
M1 Carbine	United States	Carbine	138 before 1964		US origin, Military Assistance Program. 7 in 1958
M2 Carbine	United States	Carbine	809		US origin, Military Assistance Program. 7 in 1958
Assault rifles
AKM	Soviet Union	Assault rifle	Unknown		Standard service rifle.
M16A1	United States	Assault rifle	2300 by 1978		1,650 acquired directly from Colt, Sherwood International delivered 650 to police units in 1978. Service rifle alongside the T65 rifle, being replaced by AK series rifles at the time of the US Invasion.
T65	Taiwan	Assault rifle	Unknown		Delivered in 1986. Service rifle alongside the M16A1 rifle, being replaced by AK series rifles at the time of the US Invasion.
MPi Kms 72	East Germany	Assault rifle	Unknown		
AK-47	Soviet Union	Assault rifle	Unknown		
IMI Galil	Israel	Assault rifle	Unknown		Only known to be used by UESAT.
Battle rifles
FAL	Belgium	Battle rifle	Unknown		
M1 Garand	United States	Semi-automatic rifle	213 before 1975		US Origin, Military Assistance Program
Breda PG	Italy	Battle Rifle	1 in 1958		A single 7mm rifle was found during a US Government Audit in 1958.
Sniper rifles
M21 Sniper Weapon System	United States	Sniper rifle	Unknown		
SVD Dragunov	Soviet Union	Designated marksman rifle	Unknown		
Machine guns
M60	United States	General-purpose machine gun	Unknown		Standard general-purpose machine gun alongside the FN MAG.
FN MAG	Belgium	General-purpose machine gun	Unknown		Standard general-purpose machine gun alongside the FN MAG.
Colt Model 611 Heavy Barrel Automatic Rifle	United States	Light machine gun	200		Heavy Barreled Colt M16A1 "Model 611" with M60 type bipod.
Browning M2	United States	Heavy machine gun	Unknown		Standard heavy machine gun.
M1919A4	United States	Medium machine gun	15 in 1958		Surplus National Guard weaponry. Numbers are as of 1958.
ZB-53	Czechoslovakia	Medium machine gun	Unknown		
MG-42	Nazi Germany	General-purpose machine gun	Unknown		
M1918 Browning Automatic Rifle	United States	Automatic rifle	18 before 1975		National Guard Surplus, 7 in 1958. Used by PDF Commandos defending Paitilla Airport from US Navy Seals during the Battle of Paitilla Airport.
M1917 Browning machine gun	United States	Heavy machine gun	3 in 1958		
Submachine guns
Uzi	Israel	Submachine gun	Unknown		Both Fixed and Folding butt-stocks used. Known to be used by UESAT soldiers. Believed to be FN origin. Mini Uzi reported but not confirmed.
M1928A1 Thompson	United States	Submachine gun	101 in 1958		US Origin, M1A1 and M1928A1. Mainly used by police organizations.
M3A1	United States	Submachine gun	2 in 1958		Surplus National Guard weaponry. Numbers are as of 1958.
M50 Reising	United States	Submachine gun	112 in 1958		Surplus National Guard weaponry. Numbers are as of 1958.
Grenade launchers
M79	United States	grenade launcher	Unknown		
M203	United States	grenade launcher	200		
H&K 69	Germany	grenade launcher	Unknown		
Bolt-action rifles
M1917 Enfield	United States	Bolt-action rifle	1,350 in 1958		National Guard surplus, manufactured by Eddystone, Winchester, and Remington.
M1903 Springfield	United States	Bolt-action rifle	434 in 1958		National Guard surplus, manufactured by Springfield and Lee.
Mauser Model 1893	German Empire	Bolt-action rifle	1,500 in 1958		National Guard surplus '7mm'
FN Carbine	Belgium	Bolt-action rifle	302 in 1958		National Guard surplus '7mm'
Shotguns
Remington 870	USA	Pump action shotgun	Unknown		12 gauge, 870P Folding stock
Ithaca 37	USA	Pump action shotgun	36		12 gauge, US Origin Military Assistance Program
Stevens Model 77E	USA	Pump action shotgun	6		12 gauge, US Origin Military Assistance Program
Winchester 1200	USA	Pump action shotgun	Unknown		12 gauge, US Origin
Hand grenades
RGD-5	Soviet Union	Hand grenade	Unknown		Used alongside US made hand-grenades.
M67 grenade	United States	Hand grenade	Unknown		
Mk2 grenade	United States	Hand grenade	Unknown		
Land mines
M18A1 Claymore	United States	Anti-personnel mine	Unknown		
Rocket-propelled grenade launchers
RPG-7	Soviet Union	Rocket-propelled grenade	Unknown		
RPG-2	Soviet Union	Shoulder-fired Recoilless gun	Unknown		
RPG-18	Soviet Union	Rocket-propelled grenade	Unknown		
Type 56 RPG	Soviet Union	Rocket-propelled grenade	Unknown		Chinese copy of RPG-2
Type 69 RPG	Soviet Union	Rocket-propelled grenade	Unknown		Chinese copy of RPG-7
M20A1B1 Super Bazooka	United States	Rocket-propelled grenade	Unknown		
LRAC F1	France	Shoulder-launched missile weapon	Unknown		

=== Crew served weapons ===
Name	Origin	Type	Quantity	Photo	Notes
Recoilless rifles
M67 recoilless rifle	United States	Recoilless rifle	Unknown		90mm Recoilless Rifle
Type 52	China	Recoilless rifle	Unknown		Chinese copy of US 75mm M20 Recoilless Rifle.
Mortars
M2 Mortar	United States	Infantry mortar	Unknown		60mm Mortar
Soltam C03 60mm Mortar	israel	Infantry mortar	Unknown		60mm Mortar
M29 Mortar	United States	Infantry mortar	Unknown		81mm Mortar
M30 Mortar	United States	Heavy mortar	Unknown		106.7mm Mortar
M2 4.2-inch mortar	United States	Heavy mortar	Unknown		106.7mm Mortar
MO-120-RT	France	Heavy mortar	Unknown		120 mm Mortar
Anti-aircraft guns
ZPU-4	Soviet Union	Anti-aircraft gun	~20		14.5mm Anti-Aircraft gun
ZPU-1	Soviet Union	Anti-aircraft gun	Unknown		14.5mm Anti-Aircraft gun

=== Less Lethal Weapons ===
Name	Origin	Type	Quantity	Photo	Notes
Less lethal weapons
Federal Riot Gun	United States	Riot gun	Unknown		38mm Tear gas gun
Federal Laboratories Model 515 Triple Chaser	United States	Tear Gas	Unknown		A CS gas grenade that splits up into three parts upon deployment.

=== Armoured Vehicles ===
Name	Origin	Type	Quantity	Photo	Notes
Armored Personnel Carriers
V-150	United States	Armored Personnel Carrier	~17		4 Command Vehicles, and 13 Armored Personnel Carriers, Fitted with mounted 7.62mm Machine guns/and or Browning .50 Machine guns, also a '90' version with a 20mm cannon.
V-300	United States	Armored Personnel Carrier	13		Multiple versions – APC versions, Recovery Versions, and a Fire Support Vehicle version fitted with Belgian Cockerel 90mm MK III gun and 7.62mm Machine guns.

=== Unarmored Vehicles ===
Name	Origin	Type	Quantity	Photo	Notes
Utility Vehicles
M151	United States	Military light utility vehicle	Unknown		
CUCV	United States	Pickup Truck	Unknown		US Foreign Military Sales
M35	United States	Military truck	Unknown		2 1/2-ton Truck
M809	United States	Military truck	Unknown		5 ton Truck
Robur All Wheel Drive Truck	East Germany	Truck	32		In port of Balboa, Panama, 32 were confiscated from Danish Cargo ship 'Pia Vesta' originating from East German Port of Rostock in 1986, later found in Panama Defense Force service.
M38A1	United States	Military light utility vehicle	2		National Guard era, numbers are as of 1958
M38	United States	Military light utility vehicle	8		National Guard era, numbers are as of 1958
Willys MB/Ford GPW	United States	Military light utility vehicle	3		National Guard era, numbers are as of 1958
Land Rover Series I	United Kingdom	Military light utility vehicle	6		National Guard era, numbers are as of 1958
Gurgel X12	Brazil	Truck	Unknown		

=== Aircraft ===
Name	Origin	Type	Quantity	Photo	Notes
Helicopters
Bell 205A1	United States	Utility Helicopter	21		Armed with M60D machine guns in each door. At least 1 with FN MAG machineguns fitted in gunpods. According to World Defense Forces Second Edition (1989): 9 UH-1H Iroquois, 8 Bell UH-1B, 4 Bell UH-1N.
Fairchild Hiller FH-1100	United States	Utility Helicopter	3		
Eurocopter Super Puma	France	Utility Helicopter	1		
Airplanes
CASA C-212	Spain	Medium STOL military transport aircraft	3		
de Havilland Canada DHC-3 Otter	Canada	STOL utility transport	1		
de Havilland Canada DHC-6 Twin Otter	Canada	STOL utility transport	2		One was destroyed in the 1981 Panamanian Air Force Twin Otter crash
Short SC.7 Skyvan	United Kingdom	Utility aircraft	1		
Boeing 727	United States	Narrow-body jet airliner	1		
ENAER T-35 Pillán	Chile	Trainer Aircraft	10		B and D model, used for search work.
Cessna 172	United States	Civil utility aircraft	2		
Cessna U17B Skywagon	United States	Military utility aircraft	2		
Lockheed L-188 Electra	United States	Turboprop airliner	1		188C model, in service from 1973 to 1984.
Britten-Norman BN-2 Islander	United Kingdom	utility aircraft	2		
Dassault Falcon 20	France	Business jet	1		

=== Naval Vessels ===
Name	Origin	Type	Quantity	Photo	Notes
Ships
Landing Ship Medium (R)	United States	Amphibious assault ship	1		Former USS Smoky Hill River (LFR-531)
Vosper Thornycroft 103 Foot, 96 ton Patrol Boat	United Kingdom	Rough-Water Patrol Craft	2		GC10 Panquiaco and GC11 Ligia Elena, fitted with 2 20mm cannons each. 23 man complement.
Unspecified 19 meter, 13 ton Utility Coastal Patrol Craft	United States	Patrol Boat	2		Armed with a pair of 12.7mm machineguns each, 10 man complement. Transferred from the US Coast Guard in the mid-1960's.
Unspecified 12 meter 35 ton Coastal Patrol Craft	United States	Patrol Boat	2		Armed with 1 12.7mm machineguns each, 4 man complement. Transferred from the US Navy in the mid-1960's.
Unspecified 35 Ton Swift Ships	United States	Unspecified Vessel	2		MN GC-201 Comandante Torrijos and MN GC-202 Presidente Porras received in the 1980s and constructed in the USA.
