= McFall =

McFall or MacFall is a surname, a variant spelling of Gaelic MacPhail meaning "son of Paul". Notable people with the surname include:

- Derrick McFall (born 2005), American football player
- Haldane MacFall (1860–1928), British Army officer, art critic and author
- John J. McFall (1918–2006), American politician
- John McFall, Baron McFall of Alcluith (born 1944), United Kingdom politician
- Leah McFall (born 1989), Northern-Irish singer-songwriter

== See also ==
- McFaul
- McFall, Missouri
- USS McFaul
