= 1989 Panamanian coup attempt =

Failed military coup against dictator Manuel Noriega

1989 Panamanian coup d'état attempt
Date	3–4 October 1989
Location	Panama
Result	Coup suppressed: Ringleaders executed; United States invades Panama two months later

Belligerents
(Panama) PDF Loyalists	(Panama) PDF Rebels

Commanders and leaders
(Panama) Manuel Noriega	(Panama) Moisés Giroldi Vera (executed)

The 1989 Panamanian coup d'état attempt was a failed coup d'état which occurred in Panama City on 3 October. The attempt was led by Major Moisés Giroldi, supported by a group of officers who had returned from a United Nations peacekeeping mission in Namibia. Although the plotters succeeded in capturing Panamanian dictator Manuel Noriega, the coup was quickly suppressed. Giroldi and nine other members of the Panamanian Defense Forces were executed on 3 and 4 October 1989. An eleventh participant died in prison after being tortured. These events became known as the "Albrook massacre".

== Background ==
Relations between Panama and the U.S. had steadily deteriorated during the 1980s, owing to concerns on the U.S. side over the safety of American nationals in Panama, the fate of the strategically important Panama Canal and Noriega's alleged involvement in facilitating drug trafficking. Under the Reagan administration, the U.S. indicted Noriega on drug trafficking charges and introduced economic sanctions against Panama, but these measures failed to achieve Noriega's resignation.

A coup had been attempted in March 1988 but had failed and Giroldi was one of those responsible for suppressing it. In September 1988, another coup plot, allegedly plotted and financed directly by the United States, was said to have been foiled by Panamanian authorities with the arrest of 16 conspirators.

Two days before the coup, Giroldi's wife, Adela Bonilla de Giroldi, informed United States Southern Command that a coup was imminent. This resulted in a meeting between Moisés Giroldi and two CIA agents. U.S. officials claimed that Giroldi only asked for minimal help: protection for his family and roadblocks by U.S. troops in the Panama Canal Zone at two strategic locations in order to prevent troops coming to Noriega's rescue. U.S. Defense Secretary Dick Cheney subsequently stated that the Bush administration distrusted Giroldi, fearing they were being led into a trap designed to embarrass the U.S. and also doubted Giroldi's ability to succeed and to deliver Noriega into U.S. hands to stand trial. As a result, the U.S. declined to give specific commitments on supporting the coup.

== Coup ==
Giroldi initiated the coup shortly before 8 a.m. and managed to capture Panamanian dictator Manuel Noriega. The rebels debated delivering Noriega into American hands. This gave Noriega a window of opportunity which he used to telephone for help. Though U.S. troops did block off two roads in the Canal Zone, Noriega loyalists used Tocumen airport to by-pass this and move in troops by air. Their counter-attack led to the rebels surrendering. Giroldi and ten soldiers headed the coup: Captain Jorge Bonilla Arboleda; Majors Juan Arza Aguilera, Leon Tejada González, Edgardo Sandoval Alba, Eric Murillo Echevers and Nicasio Lorenzo Tuñón; Lieutenants Francisco Concepción and Ismael Ortega Caraballo; Sub-Lieutenants Feliciano Muñoz Vega and Dioclides Julio.

== Albrook massacre and arrests ==
The coup participants were taken to an aircraft hangar at Albrook where they were interrogated and tortured by Noriega loyalists. Eight of them were then executed in the hangars at Albrook, Giroldi and a sergeant were executed in the military barracks in San Miguelito while an eleventh participant died in prison after being tortured. These events were dubbed the "Albrook massacre" by local and international media. 74 officers involved in the coup were sent to Coiba prison.

Relatives of those executed alleged that family members were subjected to persecution by the government, claiming that they had their houses raided and ransacked and had received eviction notices.

== Reactions ==
Adela Bonilla de Giroldi blamed the failure of the coup on her husband's "betrayal" by another major who, she claimed, had initially backed the move but had switched sides on the day of the coup. American sources considered that the failure of the coup was due to poor planning by the rebels, miscommunication between them and the U.S. and doubt on the American side over the plotters' motives and intentions. They claimed that reasons for the failure were Giroldi's failure to provide them with contact numbers and the U.S. failure to communicate American desires to the rebels.

In the United States Senate, the Bush administration received bipartisan criticism for its handling of and reaction to the coup. Democratic senator Sam Nunn, with other senators, accused Bush administration officials of being dishonest and withholding information from the Senate. Republican senator Jesse Helms claimed that the rebels had offered to turn Noriega over to U.S. forces, but this offer had been turned down. Helms' claims were denied by Cheney.

== Aftermath ==
The failure of the coup prompted "a philosophical turnaround" within the Pentagon, as U.S. military officials realised that Noriega would likely not be removed internally and that more significant U.S. involvement would be needed to dislodge him from power. This led to the U.S. invasion of Panama two months later.

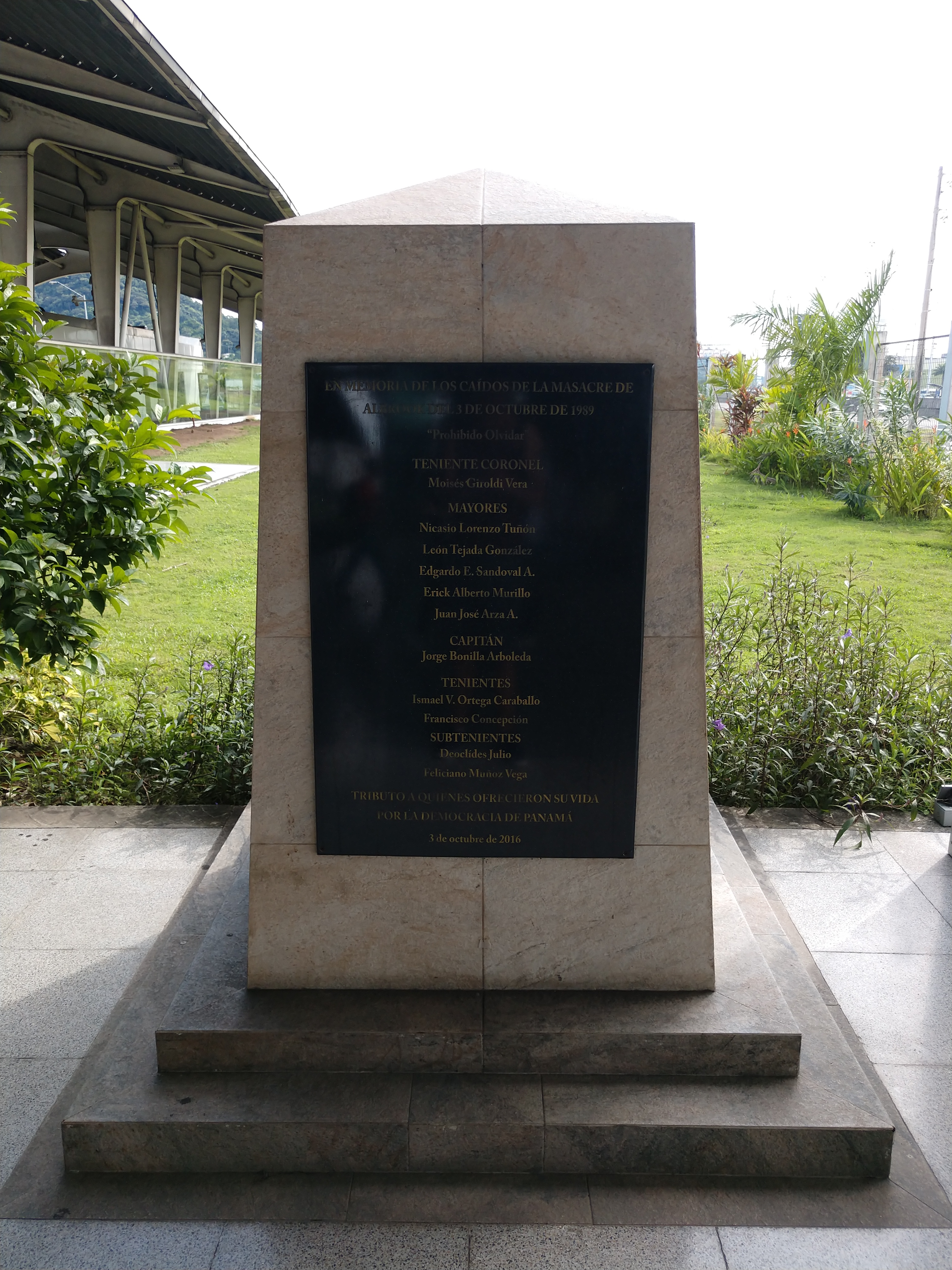
Albrook massacre memorial, unveiled 25 October 2016.

For their part in the execution of Giroldi, Noriega and military captain Heráclides Sucre Medina were sentenced to 20 years in prison and banned from public service for 10 years. Evidelio Quiel Peralta, who had fled to Costa Rica, was tried in absentia and sentenced to 20 years in prison.

On 4 October 2015, Panamanian President Juan Carlos Varela announced the construction of a monolith in memory of the 11 victims of the Albrook massacre.

In May 2016, Gabriel Pinzón, Director General of the penitential system confirmed that Noriega was to be detained until 2030 for his part in the Albrook massacre. Noriega died while under house arrest in May 2017.
