= List of wars involving Panama =

This is a list of wars involving the Republic of Panama from the colonial period to the modern era.

== Colonial era ==
Anglo-Spanish War (1585–1604):

- Drake's Assault on Panama (1596)
- Capture of Portobello (1601)

Anglo-Spanish War (1727–1729): Blockade of Porto Bello (1726 – 1728)

War of Jenkins' Ear: Battle of Porto Bello (1739)

== Independence era ==
Conflict	Combatant 1	Combatant 2	Results
Gran Colombia–Peru War (1828–1829)	Gran Colombia: Panama	Peru	Stalemate: Peruvian land invasion lost momentum after battle of Tarqui; at sea, Peru maintained supremacy after the fall of Guayaquil; War came to an end with the signing of the Gual-Larrea treaty and the unexpected coup-de-etat against President La Mar; Colombian troops were driven out of Bolivia, Peru recognized the Colombian annexation of Guayaquil and Colombia recognized implicitly Peruvian sovereignty of Tumbes, Jaen and Maynas
Watermelon Riot (1856)	New Granada: Panama	United States	Defeat: Herrán-Cass Agreement signed; New Granadian government established a sum compensation of $412,394 in gold for damages
Panama Crisis (1885)	Panamanian Rebels	Colombia; Chile	Defeat: Rebellion suppressed; Colón burned
Thousand Days' War (1899–1902)	Colombian Conservative Party	Colombian Liberal Party	Victory: War won by conservative government; Continuation of the present day Republic of Colombia; Resulted in Panamanian independence
World War I (1917–1918)	France; United Kingdom; Russia; United States; Italy; Japan; China; Canada; Australia; New Zealand; India; South Africa; Serbia; Montenegro; Romania; Belgium; Greece; Portugal; Brazil; Cuba; Panama; Guatemala; Nicaragua; Costa Rica; Honduras	Germany; Austria-Hungary; Ottoman Empire; Bulgaria	Victory: End of the German, Russian, Ottoman, and Austro-Hungarian empires; Formation of new countries in Europe and the Middle East; Transfer of German colonies and regions of the former Ottoman Empire to other powers; Establishment of the League of Nations
Coto War (1921)	Panama	Costa Rica	Defeat: Panama ceded Coto to Costa Rica
World War II (1941–1945)	United States; Soviet Union; United Kingdom; China; France; Poland; Canada; Australia; New Zealand; India; South Africa; Yugoslavia; Greece; Denmark; Norway; Netherlands; Belgium; Luxembourg; Czechoslovakia; Brazil; Mexico; Panama; Costa Rica; El Salvador; Guatemala; Honduras; Nicaragua; Dominican Republic; Cuba	Germany; Japan; Italy; Hungary; Romania; Bulgaria; Croatia; Slovakia; Finland; Thailand; Manchukuo; Mengjiang	Victory: Collapse of the Third Reich; Fall of Japanese and Italian Empires; Creation of the United Nations; Emergence of the United States and the Soviet Union as superpowers; Beginning of the Cold War
Cuban invasion of Panama (1959)	Panama	Cuba	Victory: Cuban expedition fails
Insurgency in Chiriquí (1968–1971)	Panama	(Panama) Pro-Arias Guerrillas	Victory: Guerrillas defeated
Nicaraguan Revolution (1978-1979)	FSLN: EPS; MAP-ML: MILPAS; Panama	(Nicaragua) Somoza regime: National Guard	Victory: Overthrow of Somoza government in 1979 by FSLN forces, with military assistance from Panama's Victoriano Lorenzo Brigade commanded by Hugo Spadafora; Insurgency of the Contras, with clandestine support from Panamanian military government under Manuel Noriega from 1981-87; FSLN junta led by Daniel Ortega take power of Nicaragua in 1981; Electoral victory of FSLN in 1984; Electoral victory of the National Opposition Union in 1990
United States Invasion of Panama (1989–1990)	Panama	United States (Panama) Panamanian Opposition	Defeat: Dictator Manuel Noriega deposed
