= Ministry of Government and Justice (Panama) =

The Ministry of Government and Justice of Panama (later the Ministry of Government) determines government policies and plans, as well as coordinates, directs and exercises administrative control over the provinces and indigenous regions in respect of their cultural patterns and integral development. Established in 1903, the ministry performs the following functions:

- Ensure the rights and guarantees of the inhabitants of the Republic.
- Intervene in the granting of pardons for political crimes, reductions of sentences and conditional liberties to criminals of common crimes, as established in numeral 12 of article 184 of the Political Constitution.
- Coordinate the administration of custody centers for adults and adolescents deprived of liberty and develop resocialization policies.
- Coordinate relations between provincial governments and interjurisdictional issues.
- Participate in the evaluation of the structure of the provinces and counties and the preparation of national legislation related to their administration.

Additionally, the ministry oversees the Panamanian National Police (PNP), National Maritime Service (SMN), and National Air Service (SAN). There are certain instances in which the Ministry of Government and Justice will work in tandem with the Office of the Attorney General of the Nation. However, the ministry is politically accountable to the President whereas the Office of the Attorney General is not a part of the executive branch.

In February 2010, the new administration led by President Ricardo Martinelli proposed the Ministry of Government and Justice to be divided in two new Ministries: The Ministry of Public Security (in charge of security policies and affairs, also oversight of security forces and intelligence agencies including the National Police, National Border Service, National Aeronaval Service and the National Immigration Service) and the Ministry of Government (an executive branch in charge of themes related with public governance and internal). The Ministry of Public Security was formally created on April 14 the same year with the passage of Law no 15 by the National Assembly proving for its creation. And, the Ministry of Government was formally created formally created on May 3 the same year with the passage of Law no 19.

== List of ministers ==
List of ministers

Name	Year(s) of Service
Aldreano Robles Méndez	
Ricardo J. Alfaro	
Harmodio Arias	
Eusebio A. Morales	1903-1917-1921
Tomás A. Arias	1904
Santiago de la Guardia	1905
Ricardo Arias	1906
Aristides Arjona	1908
Ramón Valdés	1909-1910
Heliodoro Patiño	1911
Salvador Jurado	1912
Ramón F. Acevedo	1913
Francisco Filós	1914
Juan B. Sosa	1915-1916
Héctor Valdés	1916-1917 / 1935-1937
Roberto F. Chiari	1923-1924
Rafael Neira A.	1924
Carlos L. López	1925-1928
Andrés Robles	1929-1930
Daniel Ballen	1930
Francisco A. Paredes	1931
Guillermo Andreve	1931-1932
Juan A. Jiménez	1933
Galileo Solís	1934-1935
Leopoldo Arosemena	1939
Camilo De La Guardia	1942
Francisco A. Filós son	1943-1945
Alfonso Correa G.	1945
Carlos Sucre	1946-1947
Francisco Solís	1947
Jacinto López y León	1948
José Daniel Crespo	1948-1949
Abilio Bellido	1949
Alfredo Alemán	1949-1951
José C. de Obaldía	1951
Miguel Ángel Ordoñez	1951-1952
Raúl De Roux	1952
Catalina Arrocha Grael	1952
Alejandro R. Cantera	1955-1956
Max Heurtemate	1956/1957/1958
Humberto Fassano	1957-1958
José Dominador Bazán	1959-1959 / 1965-1967
Héctor Valdés	1959-1960
Marcos Aurelio Robles	1960-1963
Max Arosemena	1963-1964
Gonzalo Tapia	1964-1964
César Arrocha	1964-1965
Targidio Bernal	1965-1965
José Bazán	1965-1967
Fabio Velarde	1967-1967
Joaquín Franco	1967-1968
Eduardo Morgan	1968-1969
Modesto Justiniani	1969-1969
José Guillermo Aizpú	1969-1969
Pedro Julio Pérez	1970-1970
Alejandro Ferrer	1970-1971
Juan Materno Vásquez	1971-1974
Ricardo Rodríguez	1974-1976 / 1980-1980
Cesar Rodríguez	1976-1976
Jorge Castro	1976-1978
Adolfo Ahumada	1978-1980
Jorge E. Ritter	1981-1982
Fair Fidel Palacios	1982-1983
Carlos O. Tipaldos	1983-1984
Rodolfo Chiari	1984-1984 / 1986-1989
Carlos De Sedas, Son	1984-1985
Jorge Ricardo Riba	1985-1986
Renato Pereira	1989
Olmedo Miranda	1989-1989
Ricardo Arias Calderón	1989-1991
Juan Bautista Chevalier	1991-1994
Jacobo Salas	1994
Raúl Montenegro Diviazo	1994-1998
Mariela Sagel	1998-1999
Winston Spadafora Franco	1999-2001
Aníbal Salas	2001-2002
Arnulfo Escalona Ávila	2002-2004
Hector B. German E.	2004-2005
Olga Golcher	2005-2007
Daniel Delgado Diamond	2007-2008
Dilio Arcia Torres	2008
José Raúl Mulino	2010-2010
Roxana Méndez	2010-2011
Jorge Ricardo Fábrega	2011-2014
Milton Henríquez	2014-2016
María Luisa Romero	2017–present

== See also ==
- Justice ministry
- Office of the Attorney General of the Nation (Panama)
- Politics of Panama
