= Moisés Giroldi =

Panamanian military commander (1950-1989)

Moises Giroldi Vera
- Born: May 9, 1950; Panama City, Panama
- Died: October 4, 1989 (aged 39); Tinajitas, San Miguelito, Panama
- Cause of death: Execution by firing squad
- Occupation: Military officer

Moisés Giroldi Vera (May 9, 1950 – October 4, 1989) was a Panamanian military commander noted for his coup attempt against military leader Manuel Noriega in 1989. Giroldi was executed in the military barracks in San Miguelito after the coup was suppressed.
