= Insurgency in Chiriquí =

Conflict in Panama from 1968 to 1971

Date	12 October 1968 – 1971
Location	Chiriquí Province, Panama
Result	National Guard Victory; Guerrilla dissolved

Belligerents
(Panama) Panamanian guerrillas Supported by Costa Rica	National Guard of Panama

Commanders and leaders
Ariosto González (executed)	Boris Martínez; Manuel Noriega

Casualties and losses
1 killed 1 wounded	27 killed

The Insurgency in Chiriquí was a small insurgency located primarily in Chiriquí Province, Panama, near the border with Costa Rica. The guerrillas sought to overthrow the military regime that had gained power after the 1968 Panamanian coup d'état. However, through terror and censorship the National Guard managed to discourage civilians from supplying and supporting the guerrillas, and the insurgency eventually ended.

== Background ==
On October 11, 1968, the National Guard of Panama, led by Major Boris Martínez, overthrew president Arnulfo Arias, who had just assumed office two weeks earlier after winning the election of 1968. Arnulfo Arias escaped to the Canal Zone, and some of his supporters began protesting the coup. Some opponents of the coup, like Rafael Franceshi and Enrique Moreno, fled across the border to Costa Rica, where Arnulfo Arias sent them money which they used to buy weapons. The former president of Costa Rica, Rafael Ángel Calderón Guardia, was a friend of Arnulfo Arias, so Costa Rica initially allowed the guerrillas to operate from Costa Rican territory.

== Insurgency ==
A map of Chiriquí Province, where most of the fighting took place. Note that this map shows the modern borders; the province was larger in 1968.

Before midnight on October 12, 1968, a group of ten guerrillas ambushed a National Guard patrol truck near Nueva California, Chiriquí. There were no casualties, but the next day the National Guard detachment in the area was reinforced, and it arrested and burned the homes of supporters of Arnulfo Arias. However, the guerrillas crossed the border into Costa Rica and escaped.

On November 22, the guerrillas moved into Panama, to a ridge called Quijada del Diablo, where they were supplied food by the locals. At that point, there were around 30 guerrillas, including three Costan Ricans and a Uruguayan. They were joined on November 28 by an American named Kimball, who had served in the United States Army and trained the group. On November 30, sixteen of the guerrillas ambushed a National Guard patrol near the Quijada del Diablo ridge. Twelve National Guard members were killed while only one guerrilla was slightly wounded. However, the three Costa Ricans and Kimball left the guerrillas after the ambush, citing how the guerrillas were poorly armed.

Future dictator Manuel Noriega was put in charge of subduing Chiriquí Province. Using a campaign of terror, such as murdering peasants and burning down their homes, Noriega managed to dry up support for the guerrillas, forcing the guerrillas to turn away a hundred potential recruits for lack of food. The government of Panama was also able to bribe the Costa Ricans into ending their support for the guerrillas.

On January 9, 1969, twelve guerrillas attacked the barracks at Piera Candela, killing fifteen National Guard members while losing one guerrilla fighter, before the emergence of the Costa Rican police forced the guerrillas to scatter. Scattered guerrilla activity continued until 1971; however, most of the guerrilla leaders were in prison by mid-1969, effectively ending the insurgency.

Due to government censure of news related to the guerrillas, few in or outside Panama knew that there was an insurgency, which probably contributed to the guerrillas' defeat.
