= Donald L. McFaul =

US Navy SEAL (1957–1989)

- Born: September 20, 1957; Orange County, California, U.S.
- Died: December 20, 1989 (aged 32); Panama City, Panama
- Burial place: Pajaro Valley Memorial Park; Watsonville, California
- Military career
- Allegiance: United States
- Branch: United States Navy
- Service years: 1975–1985; 1988–1989
- Rank: Chief Engineman
- Units: U.S. Navy SEALs; SEAL Team 4, Golf Platoon, Naval Special Warfare Task Unit PAPA
- Conflicts: Operation Just Cause; Operation Nifty Package; Battle of Paitilla Airport †
- Awards: Navy Cross; Purple Heart; Navy Achievement Medal with Gold Star; Combat Action Ribbon; Navy Unit Commendation; Good Conduct Medal with Bronze Star

Donald Lewis McFaul (20 September 1957 – 20 December 1989) was a United States Navy SEAL killed in action at Paitilla Airfield during Operation Just Cause, the 1989 United States invasion of Panama. He was posthumously awarded the Purple Heart and Navy Cross for his heroism during the battle while pulling another SEAL to safety. Only two Navy Crosses were awarded for the 1989 operations in Panama. The Arleigh Burke-class destroyer USS McFaul (DDG-74) was named to honor him.

== Biography ==
McFaul attended high school in Bend, Oregon, graduating in 1975 with a 3.47 GPA ranking 64 of 399 in his class. He enlisted in the United States Navy on June 26, 1975 and was initially assigned to Naval Station Treasure Island working for port services as an engine specialist. McFaul volunteered for Special Warfare and was accepted in 1977. In spring of 1978 he attended Basic Underwater Demolition/SEAL training (BUD/S) and graduated with class 95. He was then assigned to SEAL Team ONE and did three tours of duty conducting special operations from U.S. Naval Base Subic Bay. He left the navy from 1985 to 1988 living and working in the Seattle and Kodiak, Alaska areas. He returned to the Navy in 1988, attending a Spanish language course at the Defense Language Institute in Monterey, California. There he met his wife, Patricia. They were married February 1988 and he was assigned to SEAL Team 4 based in Little Creek, Virginia. In December 1989 he deployed to Panama as part of SEAL Team 4. He was killed during the capture of Paitilla Airfield, Panama City, Panama in the early morning hours of December 20, 1989. According to his Navy Cross citation, he left a position of safety to assist team members under heavy enemy fire. He then carried another team member to safety, but was mortally wounded in the process. His actions saved that team member and were said to inspire other heroic acts that led to the capture of the objective.

Patricia, his wife, gave birth to his daughter Megan six days after his funeral.

== Navy Cross citation ==

For extraordinary heroism while serving as Platoon Chief Petty Officer of Sea-Air-Land Team FOUR (SEAL-4), GOLF Platoon during Operation JUST CAUSE at Paitilla Airfield, Republic of Panama on 20 December 1989. Chief Petty Officer McFaul's platoon was an element of Naval Special Warfare Task Unit PAPA, whose crucial mission was to deny to General Noriega and his associates the use of Paitilla Airfield as an avenue of escape from Panama. After insertion from sea by rubber raiding craft, Golf Platoon was patrolling toward their objective, a hangar housing General Noriega's aircraft, when they were engaged by heavy small arms fire. Realizing that most of the first squad, 25 meters north of his position, had been wounded, he left the relative safety of his own position in order to assist the wounded lying helplessly exposed. Under heavy enemy fire and with total disregard for his personal safety, Chief Petty Officer McFaul moved forward into the kill zone and began carrying a seriously wounded platoon member to safety. As he was nearing the safety of his own force's perimeter, he was mortally wounded by enemy fire. Chief Petty Officer McFaul's heroic actions and courage under fire saved his teammate's life and were an inspiration for other acts of heroism as the assault force prevailed in this decisive battle. By his extraordinary bravery, personal sacrifice, and inspiring devotion to duty, Chief Petty Officer McFaul reflected great credit upon himself and upheld the highest traditions of the United States Naval Service.

Action Date: 20 December 1989

Service: Navy

Rank: Chief Petty Officer

== Awards & Decorations ==
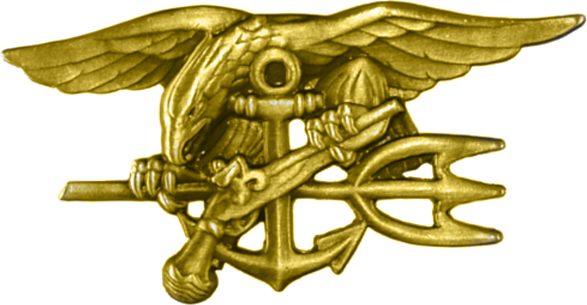
- Naval Special Warfare insignia
- Naval Parachutist Badge
- Navy Cross
- Purple Heart
- Navy and Marine Corps Achievement Medal
- Combat Action Ribbon
- Navy Unit Commendation
- Navy Good Conduct Medal
- National Defense Service Medal
- Armed Forces Expeditionary Medal
- Navy Expert Rifleman Medal
- Navy Expert Pistol Shot Medal

== See also ==
- USS McFaul (DDG-74)
