= National Border Service =

National Border Service Servicio Nacional de Fronteras de la República de Panamá (Spanish)
- Abbreviation: SENAFRONT
- Motto: Dios y Patria; God and Country

Agency overview
- Formed: August 8, 2008

Jurisdictional structure
- Operations jurisdiction: Panama
- Constituting instrument: Decree Law No. 8, 2008
- General nature: Civilian police
- Specialist jurisdiction: National border patrol, security, integrity

Operational structure
- Overseen by: Ministry of Public Security
- Sworn members: 3,624 officers (2013)
- Unsworn members: 123 personnel (2013)
- Elected officer responsible: Juan Manuel Pino Forero, Minister of Public Security
- Agency executives: Oriel Ortega Benitez, Director General; Roger E. Mojica R., Deputy Director General
- Parent agency: Panamanian Public Forces

Notables
- Anniversary: August 8

Website
- www.senafront.gob.pa

The National Border Service, also called SENAFRONT (abbreviation for Spanish: Servicio Nacional de Fronteras), is a police force specialized in the land border area and branch of the Panamanian Public Forces. Its mission is to protect Panama's land borders and protect its sovereignty and territorial integrity, and protect rights and freedoms of people, maintain public order, prevent and investigate crimes within their jurisdictions.

Created in 2008, it is the border guard branch of the Panamanian Public Forces.

== Background ==
In case of emergency or a foreign attack on Panama, SENAFRONT is the principal entity of the security forces trained to plan, organize, direct and execute all actions that ensure the security of the territory and population within the sovereign jurisdiction of the land territories of Panama with attachment and loyalty to constitutional and legal order established in the country.

The Service was established in 2008, with Frank Abrego as its first Director General on the basis of the Border Police Directorate of the National Police.

== Structure ==
The SENAFRONT is headed by a Director General, which is appointed by President of Panama with the recommendation of the Minister of Public Security per article 14 of Decree Law No. 8 of August 20, 2008.

At its foundation it had one brigade, the 1st (Southeastern) Border Brigade organized into the following:

- Brigade HQ
- Caribbean Battalion
- Central Battalion
- Pacific Battalion
- Fluvial Battalion Sambu
- General José De Fabregas Border Battalion
- Service Support Battalion

The 2nd Border Brigade, raised in 2008, is responsible for the Caribbean coast segments of the border and is organized into and HQ and 4 subordinate battalions:

- Puerto Obaldía Battalion
- Nargana Battalion
- Ustupu Battalion
- Support Battalion

The then Western Battalion provided border security on the Costa Rica border, in 2017 it was transformed into the basis of the 4th Border Brigade and split into two battalions in 2020. The 4th Brigade is organized into a HQ and the following:

- Guapito Battalion
- Second Lieutenant (Border) Aurelio Serracín Border Battalion
- COL Tomás Armuelles Border Battalion
- Support Battalion

In 2020 the 3rd East Panama Brigade was raised to support law enforcement and border operations in Panama Province and Madungandí Township. Its ORBAT is organized as:

- Brigade HQ
- Chepo Battalion
- Torti Battalion
- Support Battalion

The 5th Special Forces Brigade is made up of a Special Forces Battalion, Special Boat Unit and a Motorized Infantry Battalion. The Special Forces battalion is organized into a headquarters and 3 companies as follows:

- Reconnaissance Company and Combat Anti-Narcotics (RECOM).
- Jungle Operations Company.
- Cobra Assault and Infiltration.

The brigade also handles K-9 and SAR operations.

Its agents are often trained by the United States Army as there are daily clashes with FARC guerrillas on the border with Colombia.

== Ranks ==
Commissioned officer ranks

Rank group	General / flag officers		Senior officers			Junior officers
(Panama) National Border Service
(Panama) National Border Service	Director General	Subdirector General	Comisionado	Subcomisionado	Mayor	Capitán	Teniente	Subteniente

Other ranks

Rank group	Senior NCOs		Junior NCOs		Enlisted
(Panama) National Border Service					No insignia
(Panama) National Border Service	Sargento primero	Sargento segundo	Cabo primero	Cabo segundo	Agente

== Equipment ==
=== Small arms ===
Name	Origin	Photo	Type
Glock 17	Austria		9×19mm Semiautomatic pistol
CZ Scorpion Evo 3	Czech Republic		9×19mm submachine gun
Colt M16 assault rifle	United States		Assault rifle
Colt M4 carbine	United States		Carbine
Indumil Galil ACE	Israel/Colombia		Carbine
T65 Assault Rifle	Taiwan		Assault rifle
AKMS	USSR		Assault rifle
AMD-65	Hungary		Carbine
AK-103	Russia		Assault rifle
SVD Dragunov	USSR		Semiautomatic sniper rifle
M40A5 rifle	United States		Bolt-action sniper rifle
Barrett M82	United States		Semiautomatic sniper rifle
FN Minimi	Belgium		Light machine gun
M60 machine gun	United States		General Purpose Machine Gun
FN MAG	Belgium		General Purpose Machine Gun
PK machine gun	USSR		General Purpose Machine Gun
Browning M1919A4	United States		General Purpose Machine Gun
M2HB Browning	United States		Heavy Machine Gun
M203 grenade launcher	United States		40 mm grenade launcher
RPG-7	USSR		rocket-propelled Grenade
RPG-18	USSR		rocket-propelled grenade

=== Artillery ===
Name	Origin	Caliber	Photos
M30 Mortar	United States	107mm	
Soltam 60mm mortar	Israel	60mm	
M19 mortar	United States	60mm	

=== Vehicles ===
Name	Origin	Type	Photos
Humvee	United States	light utility vehicle	
Jeep J8	United States	Gunship BPV -Border Patrol Vehicle More Than 100 approximately vehicle actually	
