= USS McFaul =

Arleigh Burke-class guided missile destroyer

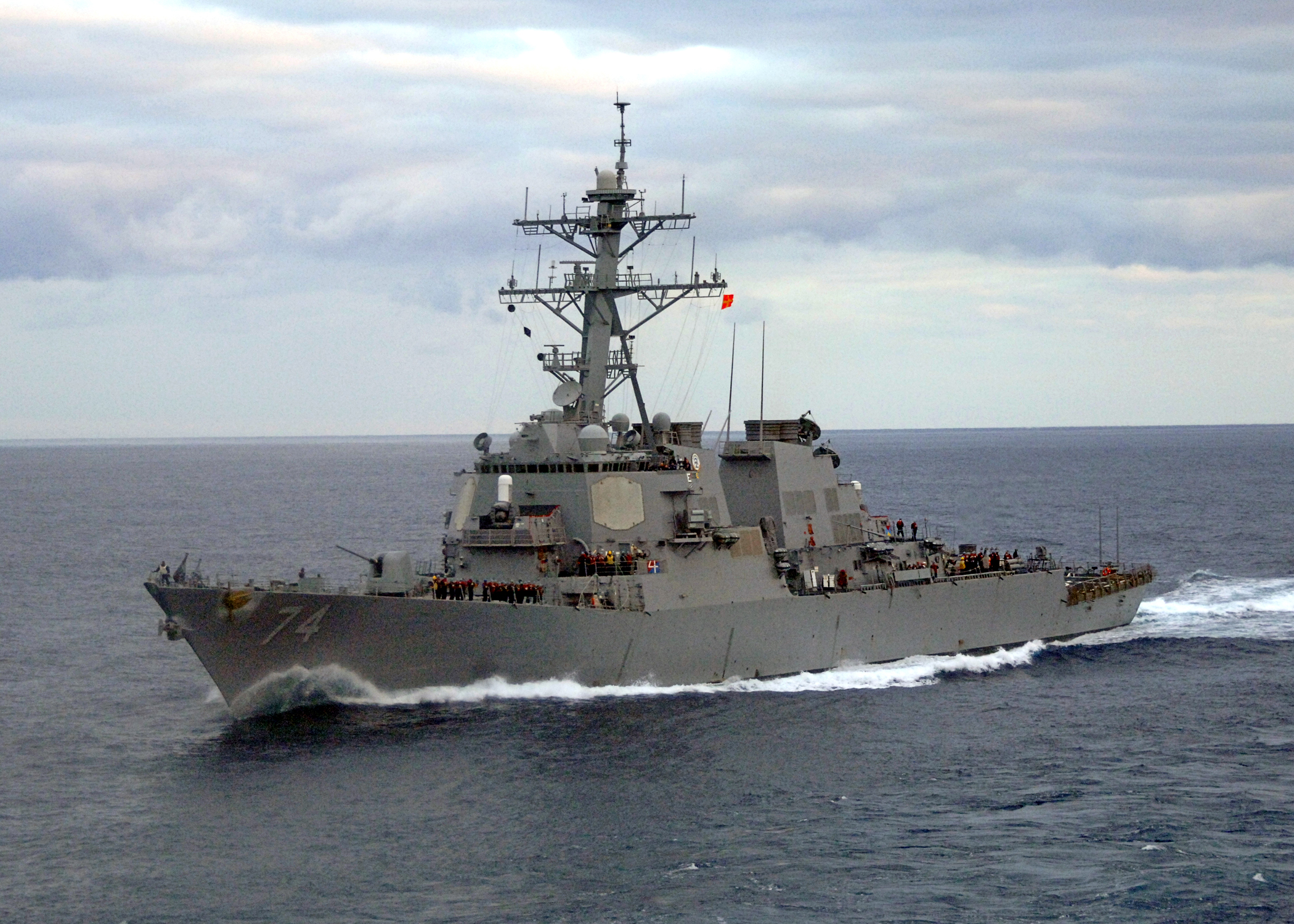
- USS McFaul (DDG-74), in the Atlantic Ocean on 5 November 2005

History

United States
- Name: McFaul
- Namesake: Donald L. McFaul
- Ordered: 21 January 1993
- Builder: Ingalls Shipbuilding, Pascagoula, Mississippi
- Laid down: 26 January 1996
- Launched: 18 January 1997
- Acquired: 23 February 1998
- Commissioned: 25 April 1998
- Home port: Norfolk
- Identification: MMSI number: 368896000; Hull number: DDG-74
- Motto: Courage, Honor, Sacrifice
- Honours and awards: See Awards
- Status: in active service
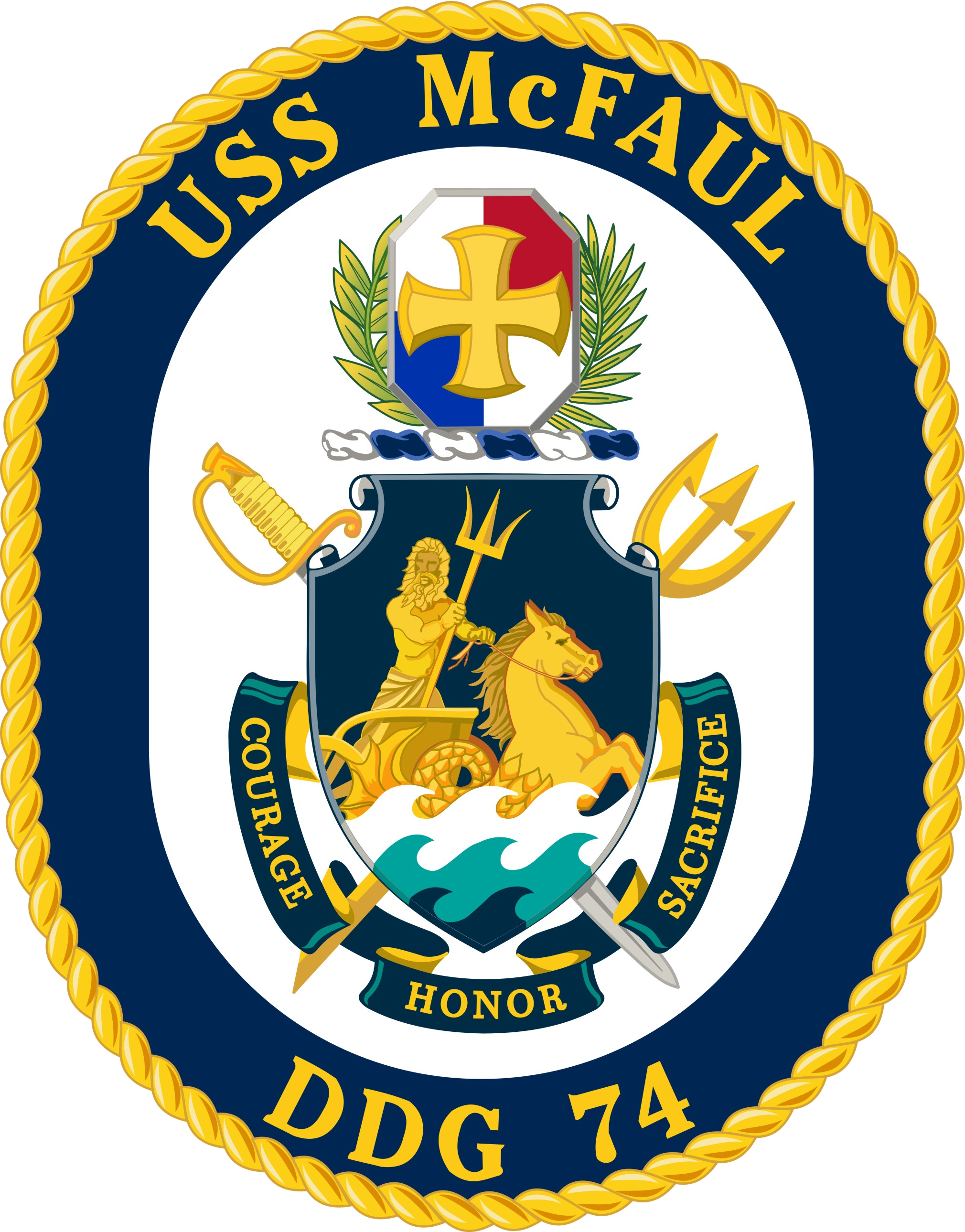
- Badge

General characteristics
- Class & type: Arleigh Burke-class destroyer
- Displacement: 8,637 long tons (8,776 t) (Full load)
- Length: 505 ft (154 m)
- Beam: 59 ft (18 m)
- Draft: 31 ft (9.4 m)
- Installed power: 4 × General Electric LM2500-30 gas turbines; 100,000 shp (75,000 kW)
- Propulsion: 2 × shafts
- Speed: In excess of 30 kn (56 km/h; 35 mph)
- Range: 4,400 nmi (8,100 km; 5,100 mi) at 20 kn (37 km/h; 23 mph)
- Complement: 33 commissioned officers; 38 chief petty officers; 210 enlisted personnel
- Sensors & processing systems: AN/SPY-1D PESA 3D radar (Flight I, II, IIA); AN/SPY-6(V)1 AESA 3D radar (Flight III); AN/SPS-67(V)3 or (V)5 surface search radar (DDG-51 – DDG-118); AN/SPQ-9B surface search radar (DDG-119 onward); AN/SPS-73(V)12 surface search/navigation radar (DDG-51 – DDG-86); BridgeMaster E surface search/navigation radar (DDG-87 onward); 3 × AN/SPG-62 fire-control radar; Mk 46 optical sight system (Flight I, II, IIA); Mk 20 electro-optical sight system (Flight III); AN/SQQ-89 ASW combat system: AN/SQS-53C sonar array; AN/SQR-19 tactical towed array sonar (Flight I, II, IIA); TB-37U multi-function towed array sonar (DDG-113 onward); AN/SQQ-28 LAMPS III shipboard system
- Electronic warfare & decoys: AN/SLQ-32 electronic warfare suite; AN/SLQ-25 Nixie torpedo countermeasures; Mk 36 Mod 12 decoy launching systems; Mk 53 Nulka decoy launching systems; Mk 59 decoy launching systems
- Armament: Guns: 1 × 5-inch (127 mm)/54 mk 45 mod 1/2 (lightweight gun); 2 × 20 mm (0.8 in) Phalanx CIWS; 2 × 25 mm (0.98 in) Mk 38 machine gun system; 4 × 0.50 inches (12.7 mm) caliber guns; Missiles: 2 × Mk 141 Harpoon anti-ship missile launcher; 1 × 29-cell, 1 × 61-cell (90 total cells) Mk 41 vertical launching system (VLS): RIM-66M surface-to-air missile; RIM-156 surface-to-air missile; RIM-161 anti-ballistic missile; BGM-109 Tomahawk cruise missile; RUM-139 vertical launch ASROC; Torpedoes: 2 × Mark 32 triple torpedo tubes: Mark 46 lightweight torpedo; Mark 50 lightweight torpedo; Mark 54 lightweight torpedo
- Aircraft carried: 1 × Sikorsky MH-60R

USS McFaul (DDG-74) is an Arleigh Burke-class (Flight II) Aegis guided missile destroyer in the United States Navy. She is named for U.S. Navy SEAL Chief Petty Officer Donald L. McFaul. USS McFaul was the 11th ship of this class to be built at Ingalls Shipbuilding in Pascagoula, Mississippi, and construction began on 26 January 1996. She was launched on 18 January 1997 and was christened on 12 April 1997. On 25 April 1998 she had her commissioning ceremony at the Garden City Terminal in Savannah, Georgia. As of July 2020 the ship is part of Destroyer Squadron 26 based out of Naval Station Norfolk.

== Service history ==
On 22 August 2005, McFaul was involved in a minor collision with the destroyer USS Winston S. Churchill off the coast of Jacksonville, Florida. Both ships suffered minor damage, and no injuries were reported. Both ships returned to their homeport at Naval Station Norfolk under their own power.

On 16 February 2007, McFaul was awarded the 2006 Battle "E" award.

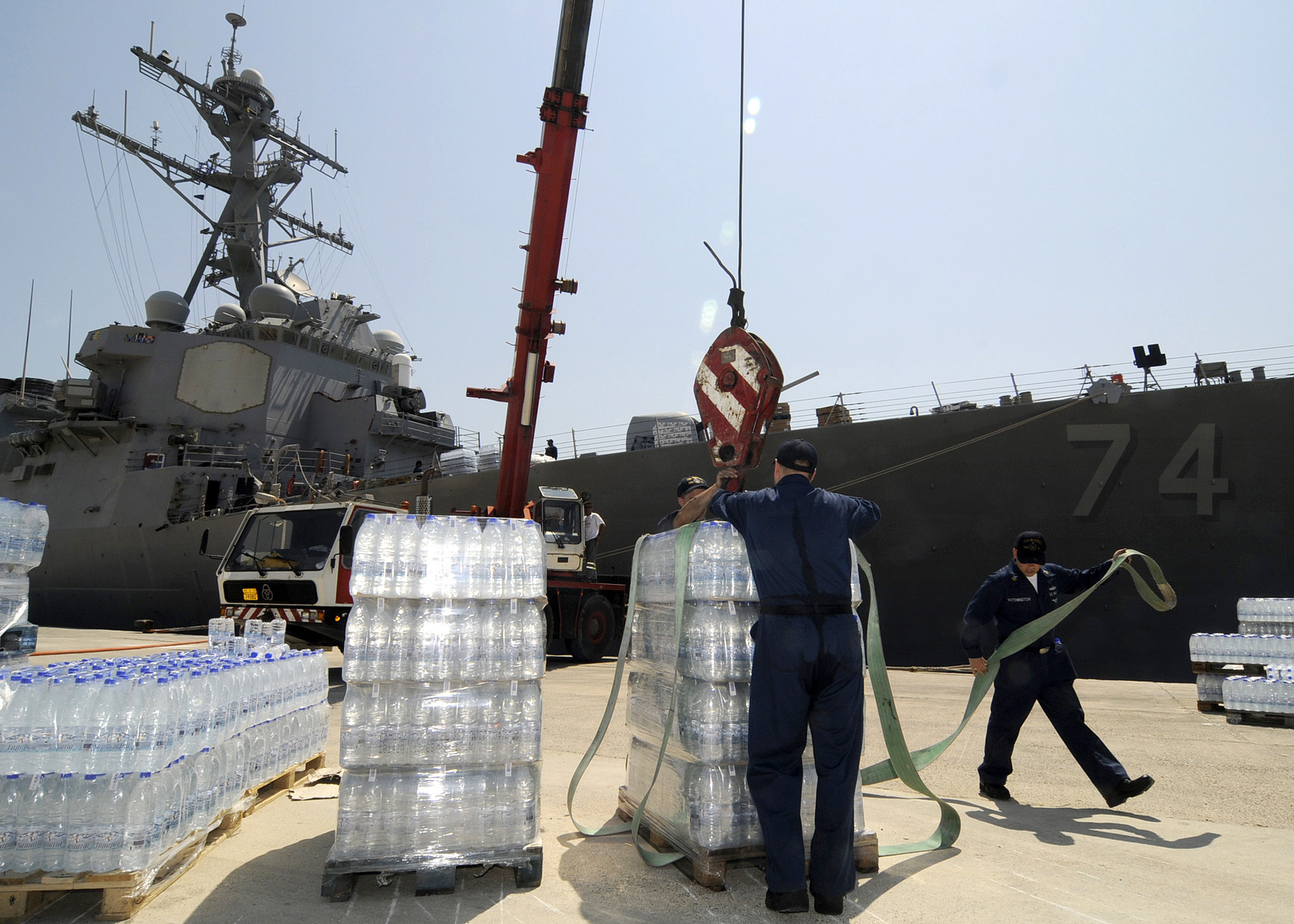
Humanitarian supplies being loaded on McFaul 20 August 2008, at Souda Bay, Crete for delivery to Georgia

On 24 August 2008, McFaul arrived in Batumi, Georgia, as part of Operation Assured Delivery to "deliver humanitarian relief supplies ... as part of the larger United States response to the government of Georgia request for humanitarian assistance" in the wake of the 2008 Russo-Georgian war. McFaul offloaded nearly 155,000 pounds (70,000 kg) of supplies—including hygiene items, baby food and care supplies, bottled water, and milk—donated by the United States Agency for International Development.

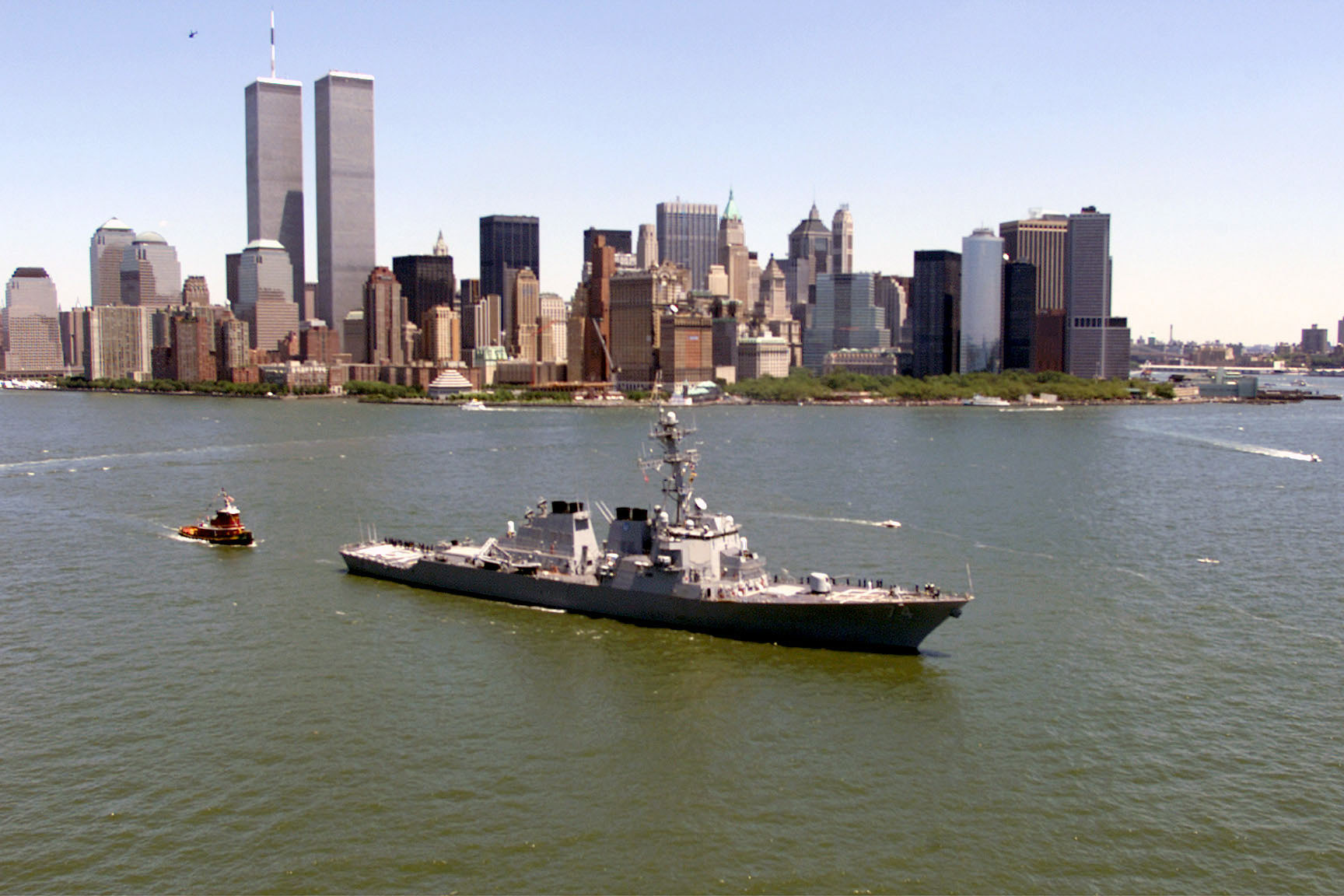
McFaul transiting New York Harbor in 2000

On 5 April 2010, McFaul responded to a distress call from the merchant vessel MV Rising Sun after she was attacked by pirates. McFaul was able to neutralize the threat, and captured ten suspected pirates and successfully rescued eight crewmembers from on board a dhow near Salalah, Oman. The pirates were then transferred to the destroyer USS Carney for a week before they were transferred back to McFaul where 30 days later they were turned over to the Somali Transitional Federal Government for subsequent prosecution.

On 12 September 2012, McFaul was ordered to the coast of Libya in what the Pentagon called a "contingency" in case a strike was ordered. This was in response to the 2012 diplomatic missions attacks.

On 5 July 2023, McFaul interrupted and prevented the attempted seizure of two commercial tankers in the Gulf of Oman. In two incidents, three hours apart, Iranian naval vessels closed on the tankers — and, according to the U.S. Navy, in the second incident, fired upon the tanker. In both cases, the Iranian vessels departed the scene upon the arrival of McFaul. The Navy released aerial video of the incidents. Iran's government claimed that one of the targeted ships had been involved in a collision and that there was an Iranian court order to seize the ship. Chevron, the company managing the vessel, stated that the ship was not involved in a collision and that they had received no notice regarding any legal proceedings.

== Awards ==
- Navy Unit Commendation – (Sep – Nov 2001, Mar – Aug 2004, Feb – Sep 2012, Oct 2023 - May 2024)
- Navy Meritorious Unit Commendation – (Jan 1999 – Sep 2001, Jul – Sep 2001, May – Nov 2006)
- Battle "E" – (2000, 2002, 2003, 2004, 2006, 2011, 2012, 2015, 2019)
- Humanitarian Service Medal – (Sep – Oct 1998)
- Captain Edward F. Ney Memorial Award Small-Medium Afloat Category - (2021, 2022)

== Upgrade ==
On 12 November 2009, the Missile Defense Agency announced that McFaul would be upgraded during fiscal 2013 to RIM-161 Standard Missile 3 (SM-3) capability in order to function as part of the Aegis Ballistic Missile Defense System.

== Coat of arms ==
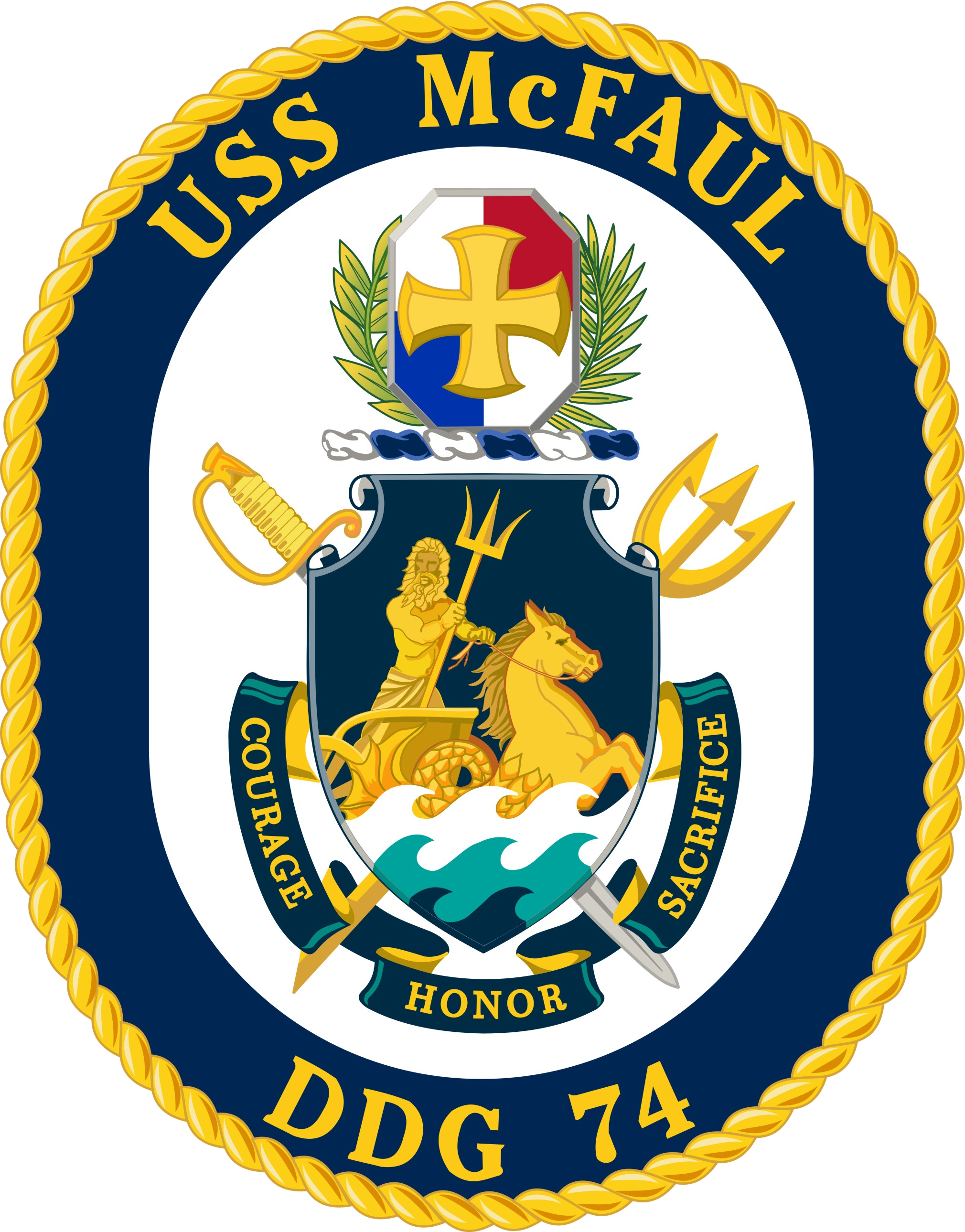

=== Shield ===
The shield has background of dark blue with Neptune being pulled by seahorses in a chariot over sea waves.

The traditional Navy colors were chosen for the shield because dark blue and gold represents the sea and excellence respectively. Neptune, God of the Sea, symbolizes maritime prowess and swift mobilization. Waves represent the coastline and highlight Chief Petty Officer McFaul's enclosure from sea by rubber raiding craft to block General Noriega's escape from Panama.

=== Crest ===
The crest consists of the shape of an array with a gold cross center. The array is split into quarters with palm leaves surrounding.

The crests AEGIS shape highlights the USS McFaul's modern multi-mission warfare operations. The cross honors the Navy Cross awarded to Platoon Chief Petty Officer Donald L. McFaul for extraordinary heroism in action under fire and saving his teammate's life. The quarter colored crest are adapted from the Panamanian flag to represent operation "Just Cause" in the Republic of Panama. The quartered sections also honor McFaul's SEAL team, SEAL Team Four. The laurel symbolizes achievement and honor. The palm indicates to the location of Panama while symbolizing victory.

=== Motto ===
The motto is written on a scroll of blue that has a gold reverse side.

The ships motto is "Courage Honor Sacrifice".

=== Seal ===
The coat of arms in full color as in the blazon, upon a white background enclosed within a dark blue oval border edged on the outside with a gold rope and bearing the inscription "USS McFAUL" at the top and "DDG 74" in the base all gold.
