= National Police of Panama =

National Police of Panama Policía Nacional de Panamá
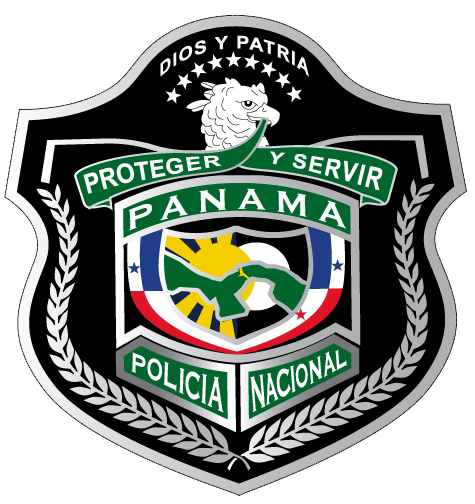
- National Police of Panama emblem

Agency overview
- Formed: April 14, 1935; February 14, 1990
- Annual budget: B/.393,914,912 (2020)

Jurisdictional structure
- National agency: Panama
- Operations jurisdiction: Panama
- Constituting instrument: National Police Act, 1997
- General nature: Civilian police

Operational structure
- Overseen by: Ministry of Public Security
- Sworn members: approx. 20,547 officers (2019)
- Unsworn members: approx. 1,100 personnel (2012)
- Elected officer responsible: Juan Manuel Pino Forero, Minister of Public Security
- Agency executives: Jorge Miranda Molina, Director General; Alexis Muñoz, Deputy Director General
- Parent agency: Panamanian Public Forces

Website
- www.policia.gob.pa

The National Police of Panama (Spanish: Policía Nacional de Panamá) is the country's national law enforcement agency, under the Panamanian Public Forces. Established by the National Police Act No. 18 of June 3, 1997, it is responsible for maintaining public order nationwide. The National Police, together with the National Aeronaval Service, National Border Service, Institutional Protection Service, and National Migration Service, make up the Public Forces. Since 2010, the National Police has reported to the President through the Minister of Public Security.

The National Police's emergency telephone number is 104 and is free of charge nationwide.

== History ==
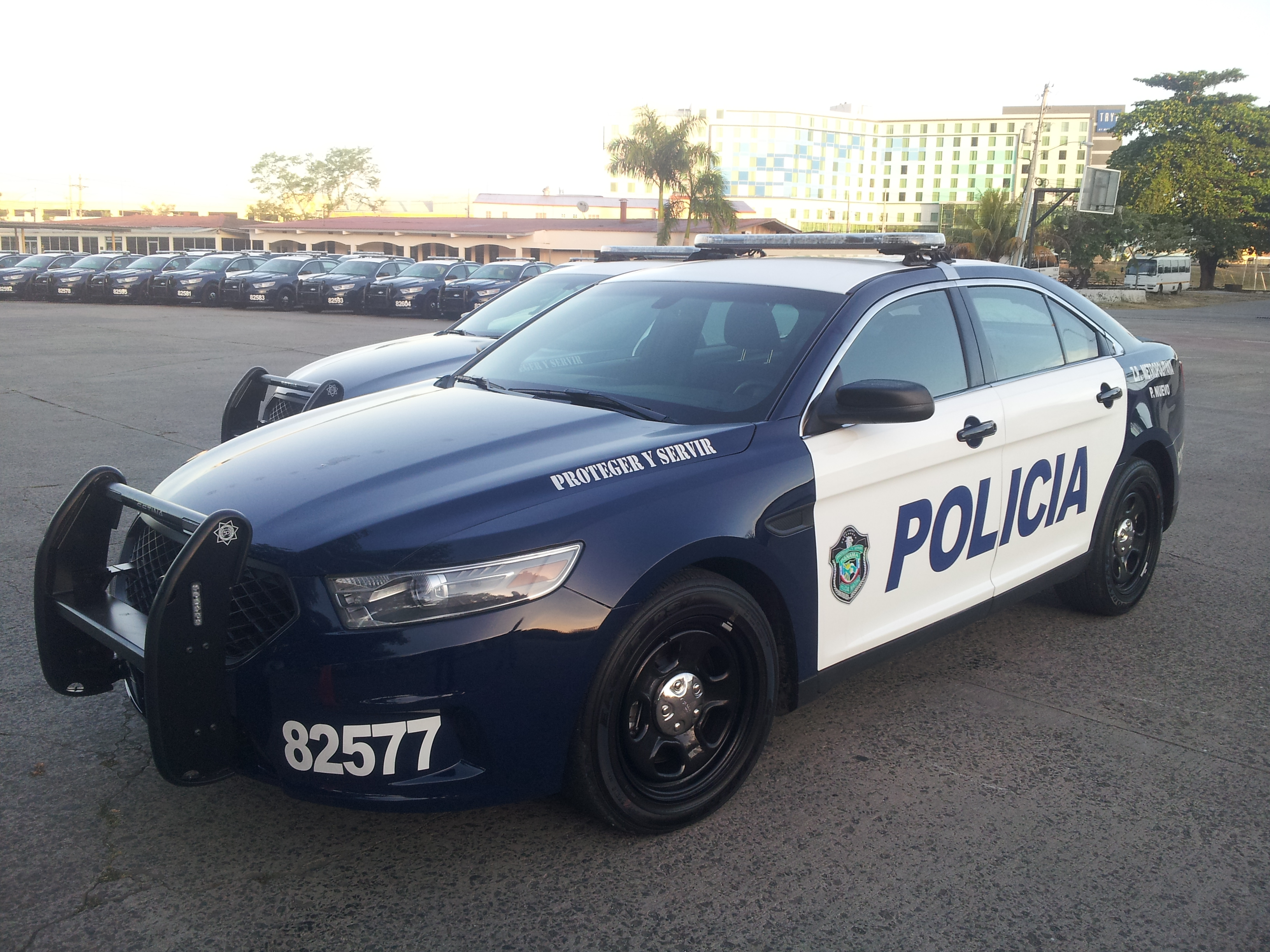
A Ford Police Interceptor Sedan used by the Panamanian National Police

Following Panama's independence from Colombia in 1903, its first president, Dr. Manuel Amador Guerrero, dissolved the National Army after a failed mutiny in 1904 and a warning from the United States that a Panamanian military could threaten the stability of the Panama Canal Zone. With the few officers remaining on active duty, he formed a Military Police Corps with limited capabilities. Crises like the Coto War (which lasted about 13–14 days) in 1921 illustrated the Military Police Corps' weakness, with them being forced to withdraw from the Coto District even with volunteer militia support.

The Great Depression drastically affected the Military Police Corps, reducing their personnel to just 200 officers and rendering their barracks vulnerable to looting and property destruction. In 1935, Colonel Manuel Pino restructured the Military Police Corps as the National Police, providing a budget and a more stable internal framework.

Around 1952, José Antonio Remón Cantera established the National Guard of Panama. In 1983, Manuel Noriega established the Panama Defense Forces.

Following the 1989 United States invasion of Panama, the new government established the Panamanian Public Forces, with the National Police of Panama being organized under the Public Forces. Colonel Roberto Armijo was appointed to the position of police chief.

Commissioner Jorge Miranda Molina, assumed the position as Director General of the National Police on July 4, 2019, in the first simultaneous change of command ceremony chaired by Laurentino Cortizo Cohen. He will serve until 2024.

== Structure ==
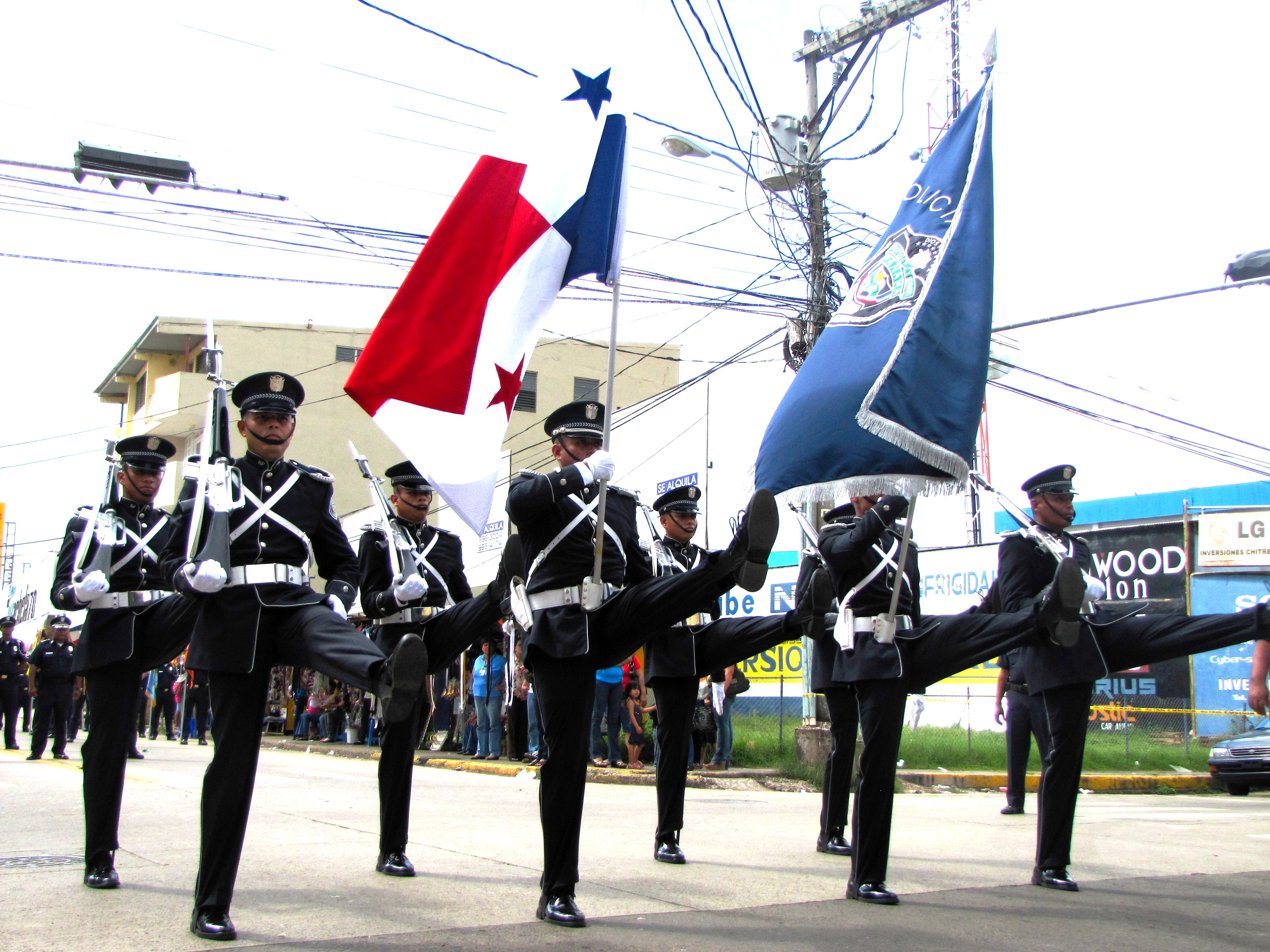
Members of the National Police of Panama in 2010

The Panamanian National Police are structured para-militarily. Police stations are present in every district, and the country as a whole is divided into Zonas Policiales (Police Zones) major city or province.

Sworn offices consist of the following ranks:

Commissioned officer ranks

Rank group	General / flag officers		Senior officers			Junior officers
(Panama) Panamanian National Police
(Panama) Panamanian National Police	Comisionado Mayor	Subcomisionado Mayor	Comisionado	Subcomisionado	Mayor	Capitán	Teniente	Subteniente

Other ranks

Rank group	Senior NCOs		Junior NCOs		Enlisted
(Panama) Panamanian National Police					No insignia
(Panama) Panamanian National Police	Sargento primero	Sargento segundo	Cabo primero	Cabo segundo	Agente

== Equipment ==
=== Vehicles ===
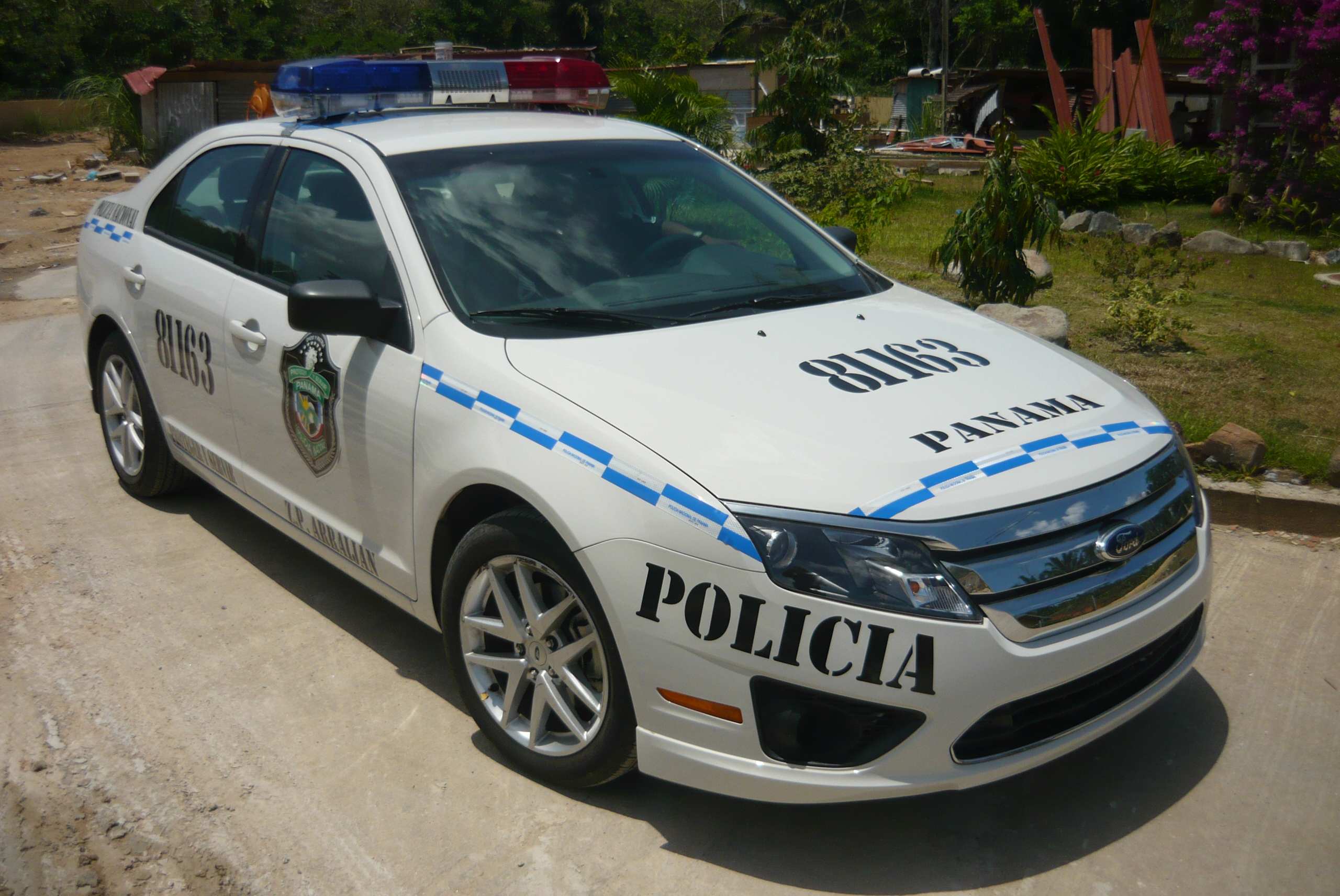
A Ford Fusion in the Panamanian National Police's old white-and-blue livery

The police in Panama have numerous vehicles at their disposal. The police vehicles recently changed color from white with blue trim to a navy blue with white trim.
