= Prayer book (disambiguation) =

A prayer book is a book listing prayers.

Prayer book may also refer to:

- Book of Common Prayer, a series of liturgical books utilized throughout Anglicanism since 1549
- Operation Prayer Book, a series of four operation orders carried out during the United States invasion of Panama
- Prayer Book Rebellion, a popular revolt in Cornwall and Devon in 1549 as a result of the Book of Common Prayer (BCP)
- Prayer Book Society (disambiguation)
  - Prayer Book Society (England), an organization which promotes the understanding and use of the Book of Common Prayer in England
  - Prayer Book Society of Canada, an organization which promotes the understanding and use of the Book of Common Prayer in Canada
  - Prayer Book Society of the USA, an organization which promotes the understanding and use of the Book of Common Prayer

== See also ==
- Book of Common Prayer (disambiguation)
