= Prayer Book Society =

The Prayer Book Society can refer to

- Prayer Book Society (England)
- Prayer Book Society of the USA
- Prayer Book Society of Canada
- Scottish Prayer Book Society

== See also ==
- Prayer book (disambiguation)
