= Democratic Worker's Party =

Panamanian political party

Democratic Worker's Party (Partido Democrata de los Trabajadores, PDT) was a Panamanian small left-of-center party.

The Democratic Worker's Party was founded on 31 January 1985.

In 1989 it allied with the National Liberation Coalition (COLINA) and its candidate Carlos Alberto Duque Jaén.

The PDT was abolished by the Electoral Tribunal on 1 July 1991.
