= United States invasion of Panama =

1989 military action in Panama

- Part of the post–Cold War era and the war on drugs
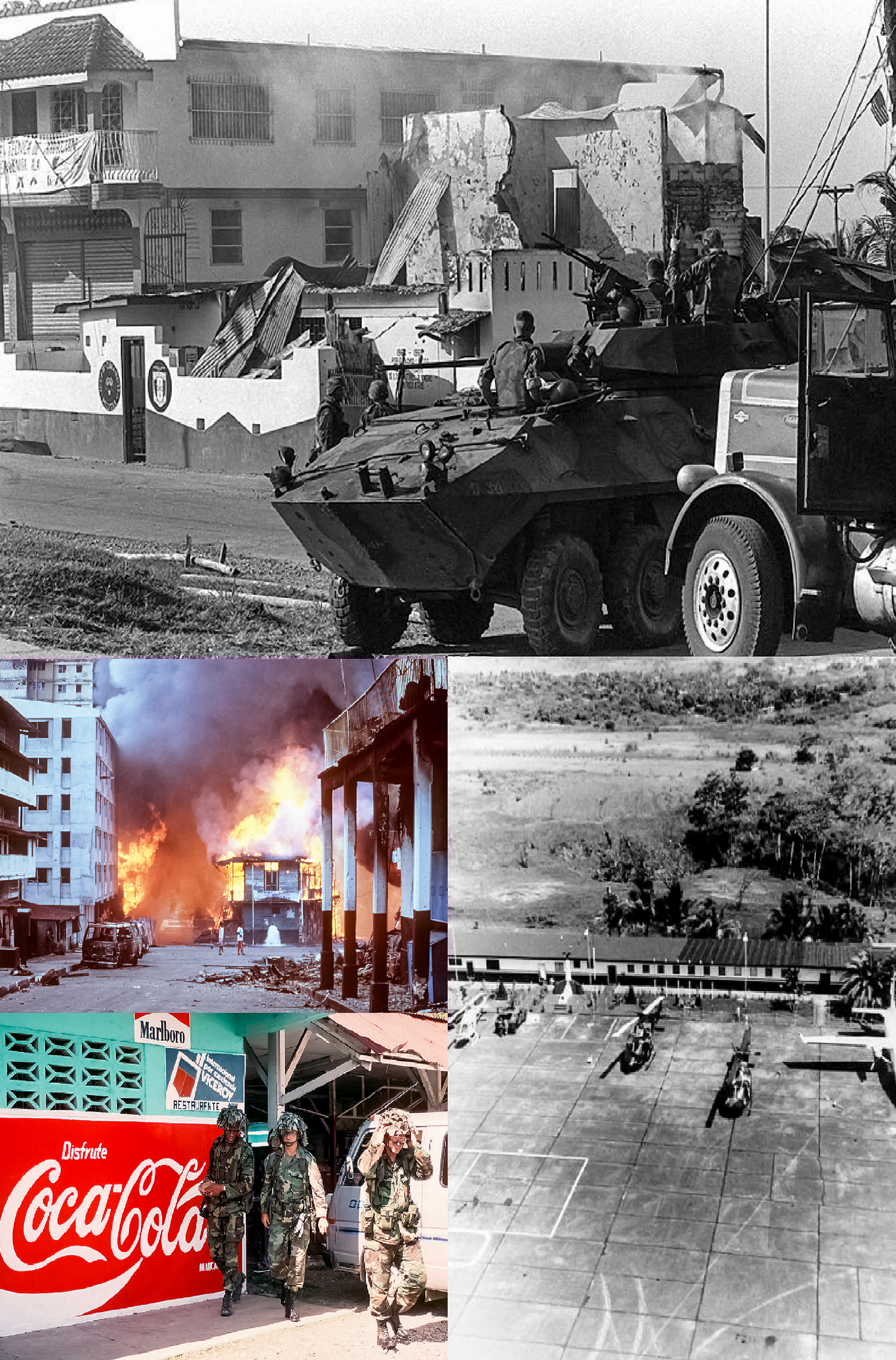
- Clockwise from top: Marines stand guard with their LAV-25; Aircraft parked at Tocumen Airport; Three U.S. soldiers walk past a restaurant; Flames engulf a Panama City neighborhood
| Date | December 20, 1989 – January 31, 1990 (1 month, 1 week and 4 days) |
| Location | Panama |
| Result | American victory |

Belligerents
| United States | Panama |

Commanders and leaders
| (United States) George H. W. Bush (United States) Dick Cheney (United States) Maxwell R. Thurman (United States) Norman Schwarzkopf Jr. (United States) Jack B. Farris (United States) Leighton W. Smith Jr. (United States) Michael E. Ryan (United States) John W. Hendrix (United States) James O. Ellis | (Panama) Manuel Noriega (surrendered) (Panama) Marcos Justine (surrendered) (Panama) Francisco A. Rodríguez |

Strength
| 27,000 | 16,000 |

Casualties and losses
| 23 killed 325 wounded | 314 killed 1,908 captured |
- Panamanian civilians killed according to: U.S. military: 202; Americas Watch: 300; United Nations: 500; RO-CADR: 2,000–3,000; 1 Spanish journalist killed

The United States invasion of Panama began in mid-December 1989 during the presidency of George H. W. Bush. The purpose of the invasion was to depose the de facto ruler of Panama, General Manuel Noriega, who was wanted by U.S. authorities for racketeering and drug trafficking. The operation, codenamed Operation Just Cause, concluded in late January 1990 with the surrender of Noriega. The Panama Defense Forces (PDF) were dissolved, and president-elect Guillermo Endara was sworn into office.

Noriega, who had longstanding ties to United States intelligence agencies, consolidated power to become Panama's de facto dictator in the early 1980s. In the mid-1980s, relations between Noriega and the U.S. began to deteriorate due to fallout from the murder of Hugo Spadafora and the resignation of President Nicolas Ardito Barletta. His criminal activities and association with other spy agencies came to light, and in 1988 he was indicted by federal grand juries on several drug-related charges. Negotiations seeking his resignation, which began under the presidency of Ronald Reagan, were ultimately unsuccessful. In 1989, Noriega annulled the results of the Panamanian general elections, which appeared to have been won by opposition candidate Guillermo Endara; President Bush responded by reinforcing the U.S. garrison in the Canal Zone. Following the declaration of a state of war between Panama and the United States passed by the Panamanian general assembly, as well as the lethal shooting of a Colombia-born U.S. Marine officer Lt. Robert Paz at a PDF roadblock, Bush authorized the execution of the Panama invasion plan.

On December 20, the U.S. invasion of Panama began. Panamanian forces were rapidly overwhelmed, although operations continued for several weeks. Endara was sworn in as president shortly after the start of the invasion. Noriega eluded capture for several days before seeking refuge in the Holy See diplomatic mission in Panama City. He surrendered on January 3, 1990, and was then flown to the U.S., where he was tried, convicted and sentenced to 40 years in prison.

The Pentagon estimated that 516 Panamanians were killed during the invasion, including 314 soldiers and 202 civilians. A total of 23 U.S. soldiers and 3 U.S. civilians were killed. The United Nations General Assembly, the Organization of American States and the European Parliament condemned the invasion as a violation of international law. Meanwhile, the United States government cited a responsibility to protect American citizens residing in Panama, along with a need to enforce democracy and human rights, as rationale for the invasion.

Some researchers have argued that it was the first major U.S. military action since 1945 not related to the Cold War, framing it as an early precursor to unilateral interventions in an emerging world order with an emphasis on public opinion, international legitimacy, operational execution, and regime change.

== Background ==
In the late 20th century, the United States had maintained numerous military bases and a substantial garrison throughout the Canal Zone to protect and maintain American control of the strategically important Panama Canal. On September 7, 1977, U.S. President Jimmy Carter and the de facto leader of Panama, General Omar Torrijos, signed the Torrijos–Carter Treaties, which set in motion the process of handing over the canal to Panamanian control by 2000. Although the canal was destined for Panamanian administration, the military bases remained, and one condition of the transfer was that the canal would remain open to American shipping. The U.S. had long-standing relations with Torrijos' successor, General Manuel Noriega, who served as a U.S. intelligence asset: he was a paid informant for the Central Intelligence Agency (CIA) from 1967, including the period when George H. W. Bush was director of the agency (1976–77).

Noriega had sided with the U.S. rather than the Soviet Union in Central America, notably in sabotaging the forces of the Sandinista government in Nicaragua, and the revolutionaries of the Farabundo Martí National Liberation Front (FMLN) in El Salvador. Noriega received upward of $100,000 per year from the CIA from the 1960s until the 1980s, when his salary was increased to $200,000 per year. Although he worked with the Drug Enforcement Administration (DEA) to restrict illegal drug shipments, Noriega was known to simultaneously accept significant financial support from drug dealers and facilitate the laundering of drug money. These drug dealers received protection from DEA investigations due to Noriega's special relationship with the CIA.

In the mid-1980s, relations between Noriega and the U.S. began to deteriorate. In 1986, U.S. President Ronald Reagan opened negotiations with Noriega, requesting that the Panamanian leader step down after his criminal activities were publicly exposed in The New York Times by Seymour Hersh. Reagan pressured Noriega with several drug-related indictments in U.S. courts; however, since extradition laws between Panama and the U.S. were weak, Noriega deemed this threat not credible and did not submit to Reagan's demands. In 1988, Elliott Abrams and others in the Pentagon began pushing for a U.S. invasion. Reagan refused due to Bush's ties to Noriega through his previous positions in the CIA and their potentially negative impact on Bush's presidential campaign. Later negotiations involved dropping the drug-related indictments.

In March 1988, Noriega's forces resisted an attempted coup d'etat against his regime. As relations continued to deteriorate, Noriega appeared to shift his Cold War allegiance toward the Soviet bloc, soliciting and receiving military aid from Cuba, Nicaragua, and Libya. U.S. military planners began preparing contingency plans to invade Panama.

In September 1988, Panamanian authorities reported that they had arrested 16 people on suspicion of plotting another coup d'état. Twelve of the conspirators were alleged to be part of the "National Patriotic Committee," a U.S.-supported guerrilla group that sought to oust Noriega. Panamanian newspaper Critica claimed that the plot had been financed by the United States.

In May 1989, during the Panamanian national elections, an alliance of parties opposed to the Noriega regime counted results from the country's election precincts, before they were sent to the district centers. Their tally showed their candidate, Guillermo Endara, defeating Carlos Duque, candidate of a pro-Noriega coalition, by nearly 3–1. Endara was physically assaulted by Noriega supporters the next day in his motorcade. Noriega declared the election null and maintained power by force, making him unpopular among Panamanians. Noriega's regime insisted that it had won the presidential election and that irregularities had been on the part of U.S.-backed candidates from opposition parties. President Bush called on Noriega to honor the will of the Panamanian people while the U.S. reinforced its Canal Zone garrison, and increased the tempo of training and other activities intended to put pressure on Noriega.

In October 1989, Noriega foiled another coup attempt by members of the Panama Defense Forces (PDF), led by Major Moisés Giroldi. On December 15, the Panamanian general assembly passed a resolution declaring that a state of war existed between Panama and the United States.

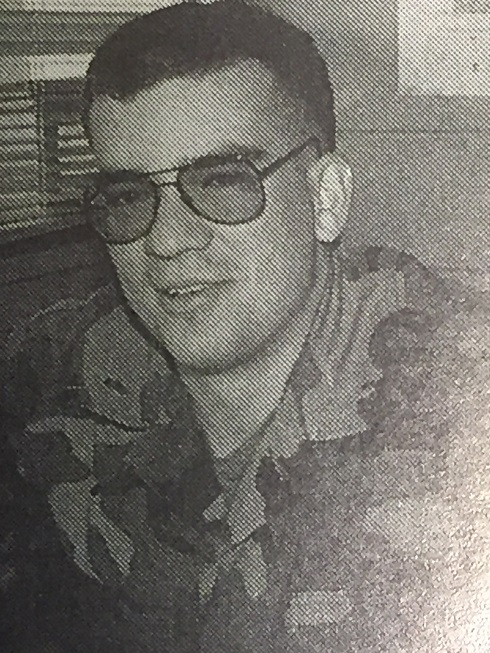
1st Lt Robert Paz, 2nd Battalion, 9th Marines

On the night following the war declaration, at approximately 9:00 p.m., four U.S. military personnel were stopped at a roadblock outside PDF headquarters in the El Chorrillo neighborhood of Panama City. Marine Captain Richard E. Hadded, Navy Lieutenant Michael J. Wilson, Army Captain Barry L. Rainwater, and Marine First Lieutenant Robert Paz had left the U.S. base at Fort Clayton and were on their way to have dinner at the Marriott Caesar Park Hotel in downtown Panama City. The Pentagon reported that the servicemen had been unarmed, were in a private vehicle, and had attempted to flee only after their vehicle was surrounded by an angry crowd of civilians and PDF troops. The PDF asserted later that the Americans were armed and on a reconnaissance mission. The PDF opened fire and Paz was fatally wounded by a round that entered the rear of the vehicle and struck him in the back. Hadded, the driver of the vehicle, was also wounded in the foot. Paz was rushed to Gorgas Army Hospital but died of his wounds; he received the Purple Heart posthumously.

According to U.S. military sources, a U.S. Naval officer, SEAL Lieutenant Adam Curtis, and his wife, Bonnie, witnessed the incident and were detained by PDF troops. While in police custody, Curtis was beaten, and his wife threatened with sexual assault. Curtis spent two weeks in the hospital recovering from the beating. On December 16 Bush ordered the execution of the Panama invasion plan; the military set H-Hour as 0100 on December 20.

== International mediation ==
Several neighboring governments secretly tried to negotiate a peaceful outcome and Noriega's willing resignation. Presidents Oscar Arias and Daniel Oduber of Costa Rica, Carlos Andrés Pérez of Venezuela, Alfonso López Michelsen of Colombia, and Spanish Prime Minister Felipe González all on different occasions met Noriega in secret attempting to convince him to give up power and self-exile himself in Spain, to no avail.

== History ==
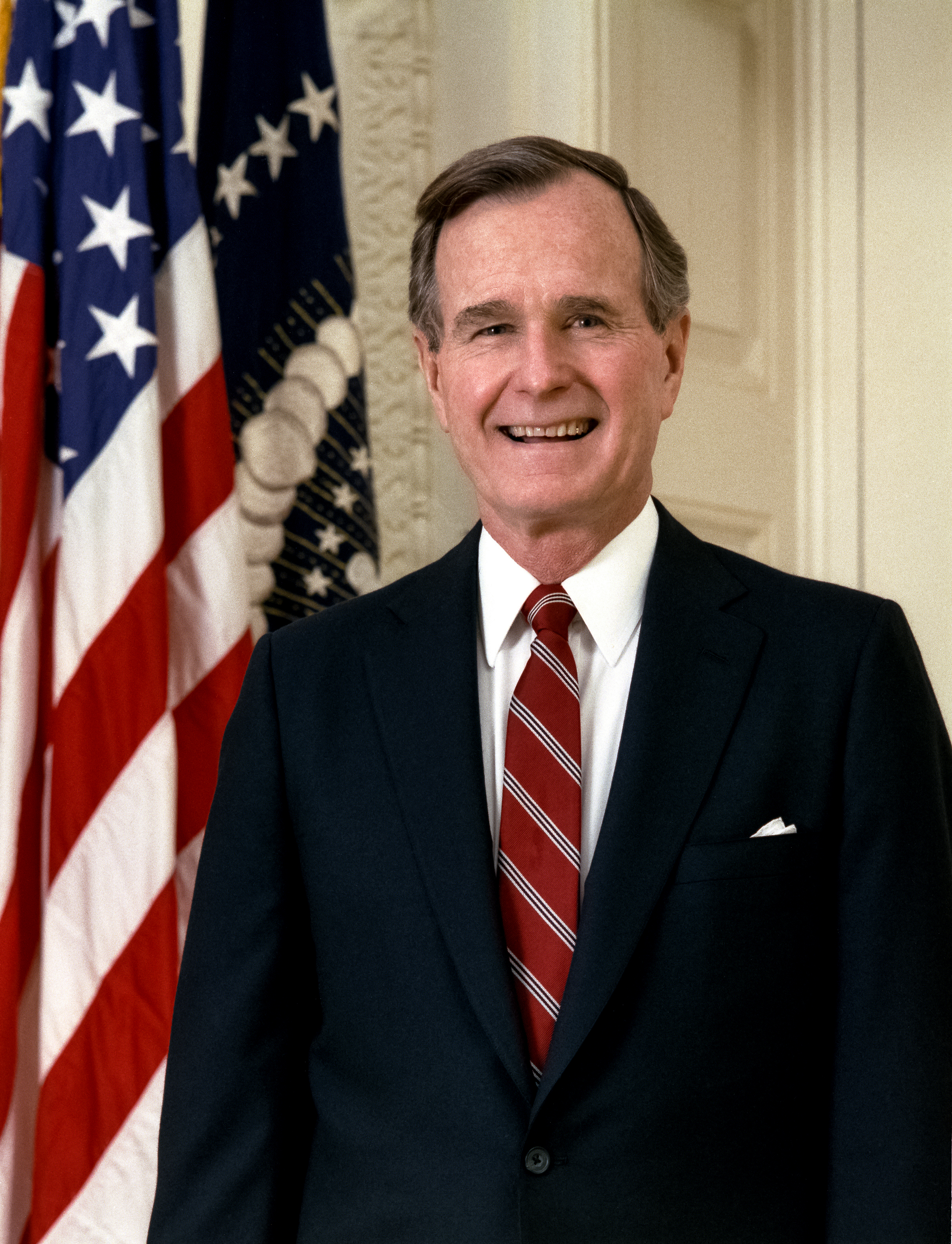
George H. W. Bush, President of the United States of America at the time

=== U.S. rationale ===
The official U.S. rationale for the invasion was articulated by President Bush on the morning of December 20, 1989, a few hours after the start of the operation. Bush cited Panama's declaration of a state of war with the United States and attacks on U.S. troops as justification for the invasion.

Bush further identified four objectives of the invasion:

- Safeguarding the lives of U.S. citizens in Panama. In his statement, Bush stated that Noriega had declared that a state of war existed between the U.S. and Panama and had threatened the lives of the approximately 35,000 U.S. citizens living there. There had been numerous clashes between U.S. and Panamanian forces; one U.S. Marine had been killed a few days earlier.
- Defending democracy and human rights in Panama.
- Combating drug trafficking. Panama had become a center for drug money laundering and a transit point for drug trafficking to the U.S. and Europe.
- Protecting the integrity of the Torrijos–Carter Treaties. Members of Congress and others in the U.S. political establishment claimed that Noriega threatened the neutrality of the Panama Canal, and that the U.S. had the right under the treaties to intervene militarily to protect the canal.

U.S. forces were instructed to begin maneuvers and activities within the restrictions of the Torrijos-Carter Treaties, such as ignoring PDF roadblocks and conducting short-notice "Category Three" military exercises on security-sensitive targets, with the express goal of provoking PDF soldiers. U.S. SOUTHCOM kept a list of abuses against U.S. servicemen and civilians by the PDF while the orders to incite PDF soldiers were in place.

As for the Panamanian legislature's war declaration, Noriega insisted in his memoirs that this declaration referred to a state of war directed by the U.S. against Panama, in the form of what he claimed were harsh economic sanctions and provocative military maneuvers (Operations Purple Storm and Sand Flea) that were prohibited by the Torrijos-Carter Treaties.

Bush's four reasons for the invasion provided sufficient justification to establish bipartisan Congressional approval and support. However, the secrecy before the invasion's initiation, the speed and success of the invasion itself, and U.S. public support for it (80% public approval) did not allow Democratic lawmakers to object to Bush's decision to use military force. One contemporary study suggests that Bush decided to invade for domestic political reasons, citing scarce strategic reasoning for the U.S. to invade and immediately withdraw without establishing the structure to enforce the interests that Bush used to justify the invasion.

=== Operation Just Cause ===
==== Involved units and agencies ====
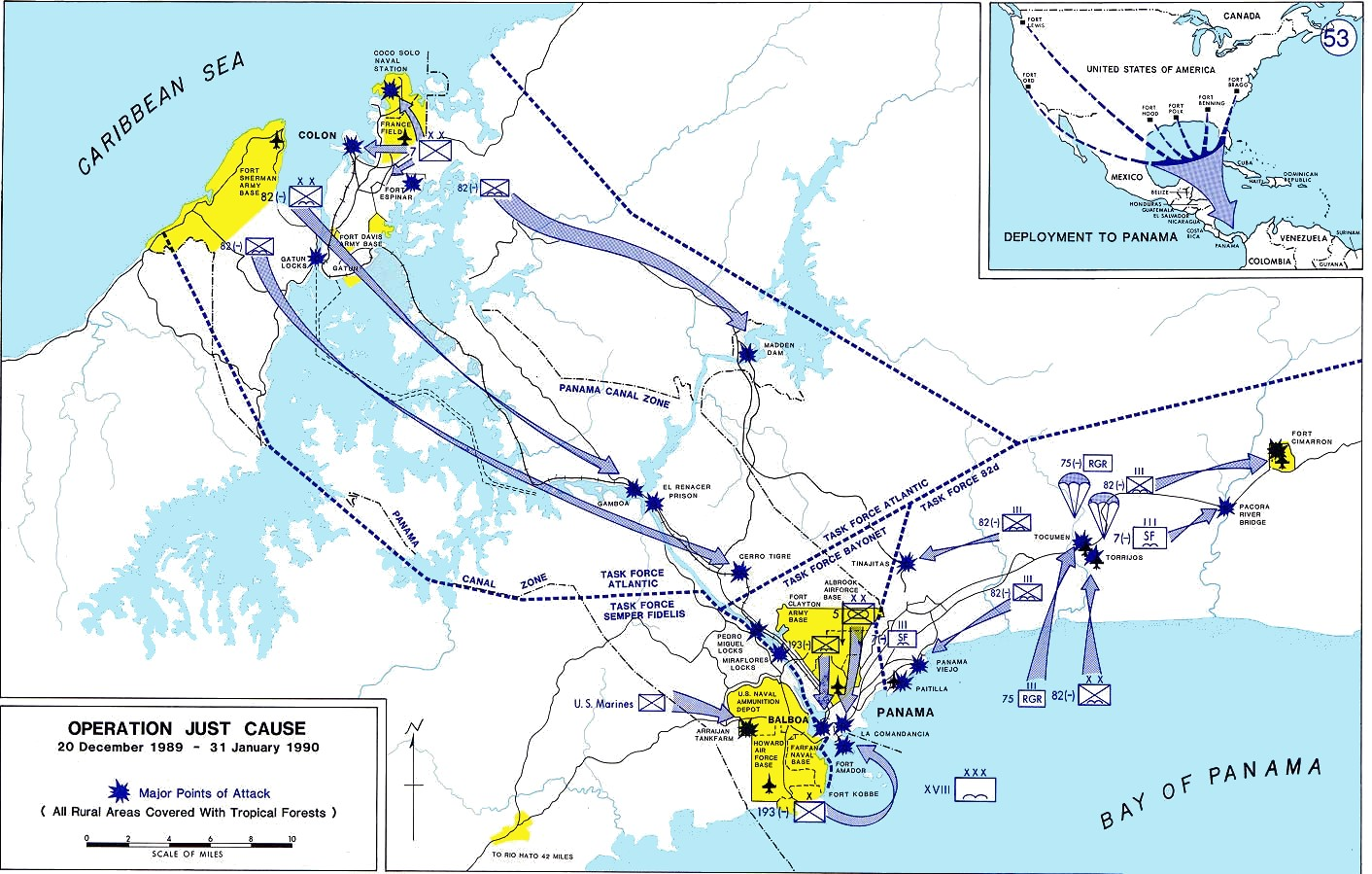
Tactical map of Operation Just Cause showing major points of attack

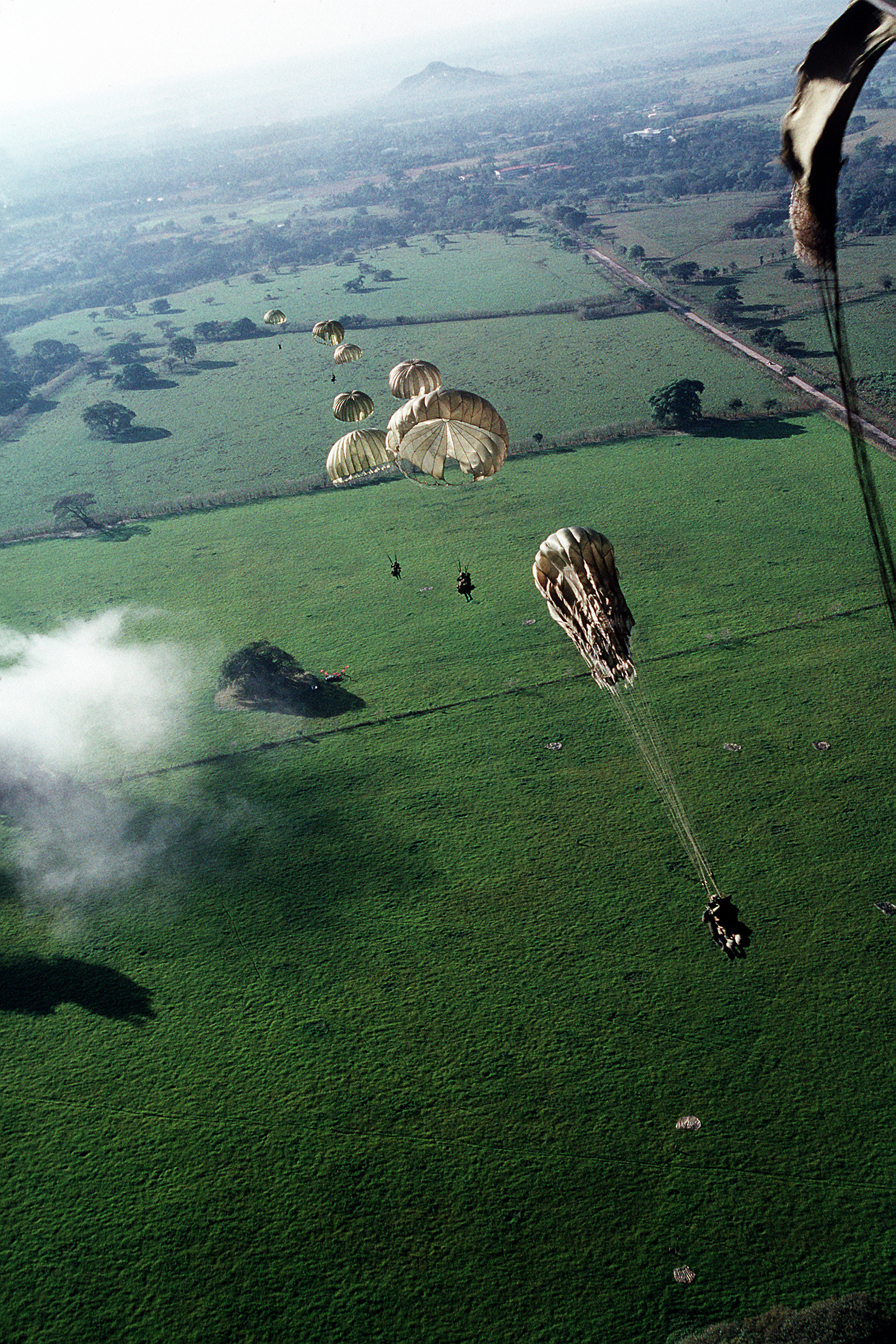
Elements of 1st Bn, 508th Infantry parachuting into a drop zone, during training, outside of Panama City

The U.S. Army, Navy, Marines, Air Force and Coast Guard participated in Operation Just Cause. Ground forces consisted of:

- combat elements of the XVIII Airborne Corps
- the 82nd Airborne Division
- the 7th Infantry Division (Light)
- the 7th Special Forces Group (Airborne)
- the 4th Psychological Operations Group (Airborne)
- the 75th Ranger Regiment
- the 96th Civil Affairs Battalion
- Tactical Air Control Parties from the 507th and 602nd Tactical Air Control Wings and the 24th Composite Wing
- Combat Controllers from the 1721st Combat Control Squadron
- Pararescuemen from the 1730th Pararescue Squadron.
- a Joint Special Operations Task Force
- elements of the 5th Infantry Division
  - 1st Battalion, 61st Infantry Regiment
  - 4th Battalion, 6th Infantry Regiment (replacing 1/61st in September 1989)
- 16th Military Police Brigade (Airborne), Fort Bragg North Carolina
- 503rd Military Police Battalion (Airborne), Fort Bragg
- 21st Military Police Company (Airborne), Fort Bragg
- 65th Military Police Company, Fort Bragg
- 108th Military Police Company (Air Assault), Fort Bragg
- 519th Military Police Battalion
- 1138th Military Police Company, Missouri Army National Guard
- 988th Military Police Company, Fort Benning, Georgia
- 555th Military Police Company, Fort Lee, Virginia
- 534th Combat Military Police, Fort Clayton, Panama
- 193rd Infantry Brigade
  - 5th Battalion, 87th Infantry Regiment
  - 1st Battalion, 508th Infantry Regiment
- 8th Ordnance Company (Ammo), Ft Bragg, NC (Select detachment attached to SOUTHCOM)
- Marine Security Forces Battalion Panama,
- Company K, 3rd Battalion, 6th Marines Regiment
- Marine Fleet Antiterrorism Security Teams
- 2nd Light Armored Reconnaissance Battalion
- 2nd Marine Logistics Group 39th Combat Engineer Battalion Co C.
- 511th Military Police Company, Fort Drum, New York
- 9th Infantry Regiment (Fort Ord, California, United States)
- 63rd Security Police Squadron, Norton Air Force Base, California
- 401st Military Police Company, Fort Hood, Texas

Air logistic support was provided by the 22nd Air Force with air assets from the 60th, 62nd, and 63rd military airlift wings.

==== Operation description ====
The U.S. invasion of Panama began on December 20, 1989, at 12:46 a.m. local time. The operation involved 27,684 U.S. troops and over 300 aircraft, including C-130 Hercules tactical transports flown by the 317th Tactical Airlift Wing (which was equipped with the Adverse Weather Aerial Delivery System or AWADS) and 314th Tactical Airlift Wing, AC-130 Spectre gunships, OA-37B Dragonfly observation and attack aircraft, C-141 Starlifter and C-5 Galaxy strategic transports, F-117A Nighthawk stealth ground-attack aircraft flown by the 37th Tactical Fighter Wing, and AH-64 Apache attack helicopters. The invasion was the first combat deployment for the AH-64, the HMMWV, and the F-117A. Panamanian radar units were jammed by two EF-111As electronic warfare aircraft of the 390th ECS, 366th TFW. These aircraft were deployed against the 16,000 members of the PDF.

The operation began with an assault of strategic installations, such as the civilian Punta Paitilla Airport in Panama City and a PDF garrison and airfield at Rio Hato, where Noriega also maintained a residence. Navy SEALs destroyed Noriega's private jet and sank a Panamanian gunboat. A Panamanian ambush killed four SEALs and wounded nine. Other military command centers throughout the country were also attacked. C Company 1st Battalion (Airborne) 508th PIR was assigned the task of securing La Comandancia, the central headquarters of the PDF. This attack touched off several fires, one of which destroyed most of the adjoining and heavily populated El Chorrillo neighborhood in Panama City. During the firefight at La Comandancia, the PDF downed two special operations helicopters and forced one MH-6 Little Bird helicopter to crash-land in the Panama Canal. The opening round of attacks in Panama City also included a special operations raid on the Carcel Modelo prison (known as Operation Acid Gambit) to free Kurt Muse, a U.S. citizen convicted of espionage by Noriega.

The assault on La Comandancia was supported by M551 Sheridan tanks attached to C Company, 3/73rd Armor, 82nd Airborne Division, the first and only time they were air dropped in a combat zone. Four of them had been transported in secret to Howard Air Force Base aboard a C-5 Galaxy in November, while other 10 were parachute dropped by a C-141 to Torrijos-Tocumen Airport several hours into the invasion.

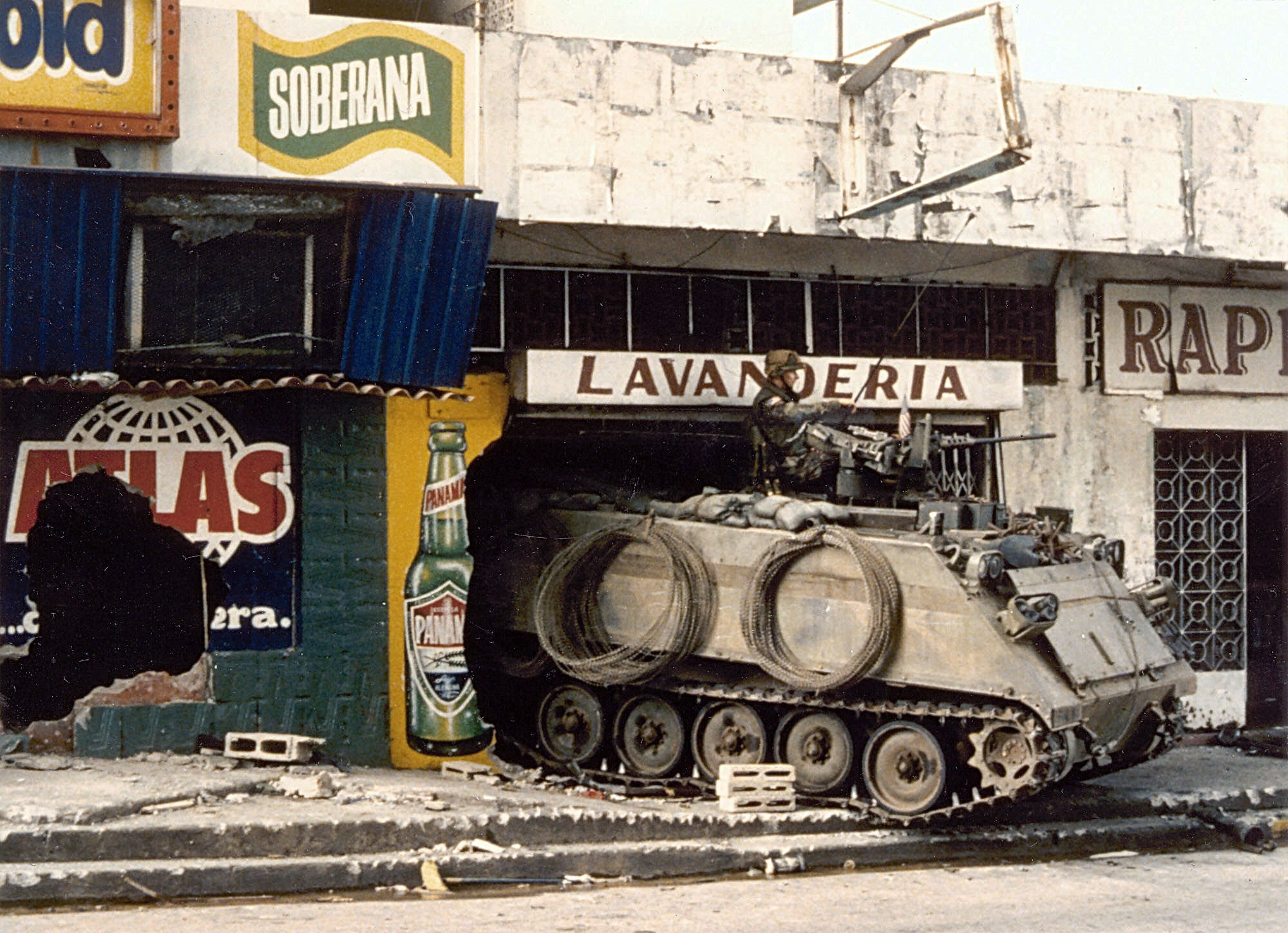
A U.S. Army M113

Fort Amador was secured by elements of the 1st Battalion (Airborne), 508th Parachute Infantry Regiment, 5th Infantry Division [Scouts] and 59th Engineer Company (sappers) in a nighttime air assault which secured the fort in the early hours of December 20. Fort Amador was a key position because of its relationship to the large oil farms adjacent to the canal, the Bridge of the Americas over the canal, and the Pacific entrance to the canal. Key command and control elements of the PDF were stationed there. Furthermore, Fort Amador had a large U.S. housing district that needed to be secured to prevent the PDF from taking U.S. citizens as hostages. This position also protected the left flank of the attack on La Comandancia and the securing of the El Chorrillos neighborhood, guarded by Noriega's Dignity Battalions. Military police units from Fort Bragg, North Carolina, deployed via strategic airlift into Howard Air Force Base the next morning and secured key government buildings in Panama City. MPs seized PDF weapons, vehicles and supplies during house-to-house searches in the following days and conducted urban combat operations against snipers and Dignity Battalion holdouts for the following week.

A few hours after the invasion began, Guillermo Endara, who had been the presumed winner of the scheduled presidential election earlier in 1989, was sworn in at Fort Clayton.

A platoon from the 1138th Military Police Company, Missouri Army National Guard, which was on a routine two-week rotation to Panama, was called upon to set up a detainee camp on Empire Range to handle the mass of civilian and military detainees. This was the first National Guard unit called into active service since the Vietnam War.

==== Capture of Noriega ====
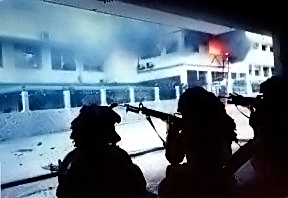
American soldiers preparing to take La Comandancia in the El Chorrillo neighborhood of Panama City, December 1989

Operation Nifty Package was an operation launched by Navy SEALs to prevent Noriega's escape. They sank his boat and destroyed his jet, at a cost of four killed and nine wounded. Military operations continued for several weeks, mainly against PDF units. Noriega remained at large for several days, but realizing he had few options in the face of a massive manhunt and a $1 million reward for his capture, he obtained refuge in the Apostolic Nunciature of the diplomatic mission of the Holy See in Panama City. However, the U.S. military's psychological warfare pressure on Noriega was relentless, reportedly with the playing of loud rock-and-roll music day and night in the densely populated area surrounding the Holy See mission. A report of the Office of the Chairman of the Joint Chiefs of Staff claimed that the music was used principally to prevent parabolic microphones from being used to eavesdrop on negotiations and not as a psychological weapon based around Noriega's supposed loathing of rock music. Noriega finally surrendered to U.S. forces on January 3, 1990. He was immediately put on an MC-130E Combat Talon I aircraft and flown to the United States.

==== Casualties ====
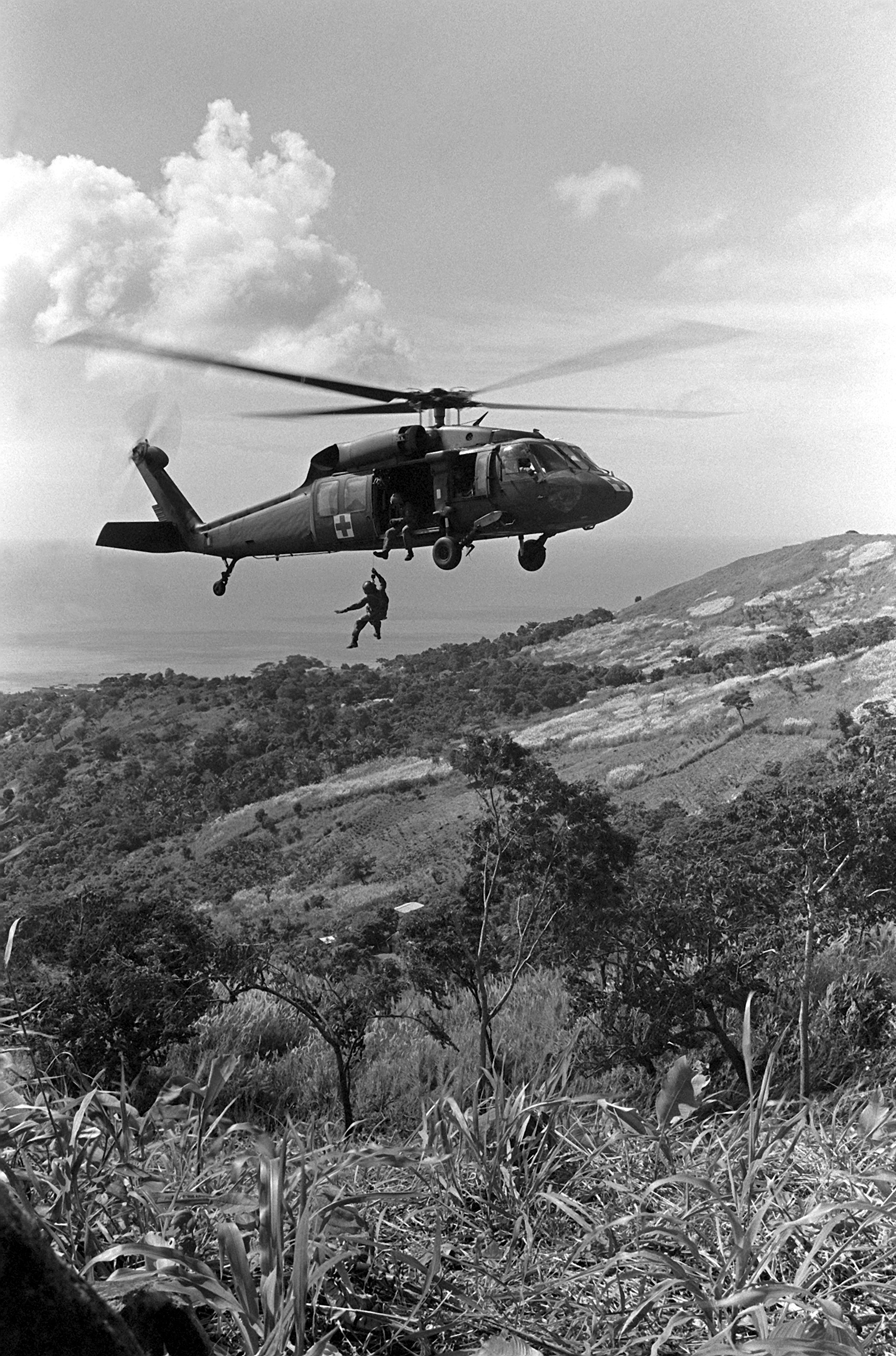
A U.S. Army Sikorsky UH-60 Black Hawk picks up a Marine casualty

According to official Pentagon figures, 516 Panamanians were killed during the invasion, including 314 soldiers and 202 civilians; however, an internal U.S. Army memo estimated the number at 1,000. The United Nations estimated 500 civilian deaths, whereas Americas Watch estimated 300 civilian deaths. President Guillermo Endara said that "less than 600 Panamanians" died during the entire invasion. Former U.S. Attorney General Ramsey Clark estimated 3,000 civilian deaths. The Roman Catholic Church estimated that 673 Panamanians were killed in total. Physicians for Human Rights said it had received "reliable reports of more than 100 civilian deaths" that were not included in the U.S. military estimate but also that there was no evidence of several thousand civilian deaths. According to The New York Times, figures estimating thousands of civilian casualties were widely rejected in Panama.

Human Rights Watch's 1991 report stated that even with these uncertainties, the figures on civilian casualties are "still troublesome" because:

With respect to the United States forces, our report concluded that the tactics and weapons utilized resulted in an inordinate number of civilian victims, in violation of specific obligations under the Geneva Conventions. [...][Panama's civilian deaths] reveal that the "surgical operation" by American forces inflicted a toll in civilian lives that was at least four-and-a-half times higher than military casualties in the enemy, and twelve or thirteen times higher than the casualties suffered by U.S. troops. By themselves, these ratios suggest that the rule of proportionality and the duty to minimize harm to civilians, where doing so would not compromise a legitimate military objective, were not faithfully observed by the invading U.S. forces. For us, the controversy over the number of civilian casualties should not obscure the important debate on the manner in which those people died.

U.S. military casualties in the invasion were 23 killed and 325 wounded. In June 1990, the U.S. military announced that of its casualties, 2 dead and 19 wounded were victims of friendly fire. The number of Panamanian military dead was estimated at 314 by SOUTHCOM.

Civilian fatalities included Kandi Helin and Ray Dragseth, two American schoolteachers working in Panama for the Department of Defense Schools. The adult son of another teacher, Rick Paul, was also killed by friendly fire as he ran towards an American roadblock. Juan Antonio Rodriguez Moreno, a Spanish freelance press photographer on assignment for El País, was killed outside of the Marriott Caesar Park Hotel in Panama City early on December 21. In June 1990, his family filed a claim for wrongful death against the U.S. government. When the claim was rejected by the U.S. government in 1992, the Spanish government sent a Note Verbale extending diplomatic protection to Rodriguez and demanding compensation on behalf of his family. The U.S. government again rejected the claim, disputing both its liability for warzone deaths in general and whether Rodriguez had been killed by U.S. rather than Panamanian gunfire.

==== Women's roles ====
Operation Just Cause involved the unprecedented use of U.S. military women during an invasion. Approximately 600 of the 26,000 members of the U.S. forces involved in the invasion were women. Women did not serve in direct combat roles or combat arms units, but did serve as military police, truck drivers, helicopter pilots, and in other logistical roles. Captain Linda L. Bray, commander of the 988th Military Police Company of Fort Benning, Georgia, led her troops in a three-hour firefight against PDF troops who refused to surrender a dog kennel which (it was later discovered) they were using to store weapons. Bray was said to be the first woman to lead U.S. troops in battle, and her role in the firefight led to controversy in the media and in Congress over women's roles in the U.S. military. Bray requested and received a discharge in 1991.

First Lieutenant Lisa Kutschera and Warrant Officer Debra Mann piloted UH-60 "Blackhawk" helicopters ferrying infantry troops. Their helicopters came under fire during the invasion, and like their male counterparts, both women were awarded Air Medals for their roles during the invasion.

The traditional role of women in wars had also seen a transformation during the invasion. Besides being combat medics and logisticians, many women took on support roles and provided crucial support that facilitated the operational objectives. This included roles in transportation, supply chain management, and intelligence. Outside of the battlefield, female journalists and reporters expansively covered the invasion, providing critical information to the public and bringing international attention to the events unfolding in Panama. These perspectives and the subsequent public discussion eventually led to the shaping of the public perception of the U.S. military action.

==== Origin of the name "Operation Just Cause" ====
Operation plans directed against Panama had evolved from plans designed to defend the Panama Canal. They became more aggressive as the situation between the two nations deteriorated. The Prayer Book series of plans included rehearsals for a possible clash (Operation Purple Storm) and missions to secure U.S. sites (Operation Bushmaster). The original operation, in which U.S. troops were deployed to Panama in early 1989, was called Operation Nimrod Dancer.

Eventually these plans became Operation Blue Spoon, renamed Operation Just Cause by the Pentagon to sustain the perceived legitimacy of the invasion. General Colin Powell said that he liked the name because "even our severest critics would have to utter 'Just Cause' while denouncing us." Critics, however, renamed it Operation "Just 'Cuz," arguing that it had been undertaken "just [be]cause Bush felt like it."

The post-invasion civil-military operation designed to stabilize the situation, support the U.S.-installed government, and restore basic services was originally planned as Operation Blind Logic, but was renamed "Operation Promote Liberty" by the Pentagon on the eve of the invasion.

== Legality ==
The U.S. government invoked self-defense as a legal justification for the invasion. Several scholars and observers have opined that the invasion was illegal under international law, arguing that the government's justifications were, according to these sources, factually groundless, and moreover, even if they had been true they would have provided inadequate support for the invasion under international law. Article 2 of the United Nations Charter, a cornerstone of international law, prohibits the use of force by member states to settle disputes except in self-defense or when authorized by the United Nations Security Council. Articles 18 and 20 of the Charter of the Organization of American States, written in part in reaction to the history of U.S. military interventions in Central America, also explicitly prohibit the use of force by member states: "[n]o state or group of states has the right to intervene, directly or indirectly, for any reason whatever, in the internal affairs of any other state". The OAS charter further states that "the territory of a states is inviolable; it may not be the object, even temporarily, of military occupation or of other measures of force taken by another state, directly or indirectly, on any grounds whatever." Other international law experts who have examined the legal justification of the invasion have concluded that it was a "gross violation" of international law.

The United Nations General Assembly passed a resolution which determined that the U.S. invasion was a "flagrant violation of international law." A similar resolution proposed by the United Nations Security Council was supported by the majority of its member nations but vetoed by the U.S., the United Kingdom and France.

Independent experts and observers have concluded that the invasion also exceeded the authority of the president under the United States Constitution. Article I, Section 8 of the Constitution grants the power to declare war solely to the Congress, not to the president. The Bush administration argued that the military intervention was constitutional because the Panamanian national assembly had declared a state of war with the United States. This argument is supported by the Federal Convention, where James Madison moved to insert "declare" instead of "make" in "make war," leaving to the executive the power to repel sudden attacks. According to observers, the invasion also violated the War Powers Resolution – a federal law designed to limit presidential action without Congressional authorization – because the president failed to consult with Congress regarding the invasion prior to its execution.

The Washington Post disclosed several rulings of the Office of Legal Counsel, issued shortly before the invasion, regarding the U.S. forces being charged with making an arrest abroad. One ruling interpreted an executive order which prohibits the assassination of foreign leaders as suggesting that accidental killings would be acceptable foreign policy. Another ruling concluded that the Posse Comitatus Act of 1878, which prohibits the armed forces from making arrests without Congressional authorization, is effective only within the boundaries of the U.S., such that the military could be used as a police force abroad—for example, in Panama, to enforce a federal court warrant against Noriega.

== Local and international reactions ==
The invasion provoked international outrage. Some countries charged that the U.S. had committed an act of aggression by invading Panama and was trying to conceal a new manifestation of its interventionist policy of force in Central America. On December 29, the United Nations General Assembly voted 75–20, with 40 abstentions, to condemn the invasion as a flagrant violation of international law.

On December 22, the Organization of American States (OAS) passed a resolution denouncing the invasion and calling for withdrawal of U.S. troops, as well as a resolution condemning the violation of the diplomatic status of the Nicaraguan embassy in Panama by U.S. Special Forces who had entered the building. At the United Nations Security Council, seven nations initiated a draft resolution demanding the immediate withdrawal of U.S. forces from Panama. It was vetoed on December 23 by the U.S., the United Kingdom and France, which cited its right of self-defense of 35,000 Americans present on the Panama Canal.

Peru recalled its ambassador from the U.S. in protest of the invasion.

In Romania, President Nicolae Ceaușescu, who was being overthrown in a violent revolution, criticized the invasion as "brutal aggression".

Polls show that the Panamanian people overwhelmingly supported the invasion. According to a CBS News poll, 92% of Panamanian adults supported the invasion, and 76% wished that U.S. forces had invaded in October during the second attempted coup. The poll was conducted in 158 randomly selected areas of the country covering about 75 percent of Panama's adult population. CBS News said the margin of sampling error was plus or minus four percentage points. Human Rights Watch described the reaction of the civilian population to the invasion as "generally sympathetic". According to Robert Pastor, a former U.S. national security advisor, 74% of Americans polled approved of the action.

Eighteen years after the invasion, Panama's National Assembly unanimously declared December 20, 2007, to be a day of national mourning. The resolution was vetoed by President Martin Torrijos. On December 19, 2019, the Panamanian government declared December 20 to be a National Day of Mourning (Dia de duelo nacional), to be marked by lowering the national flag to half-staff.

== Aftermath ==
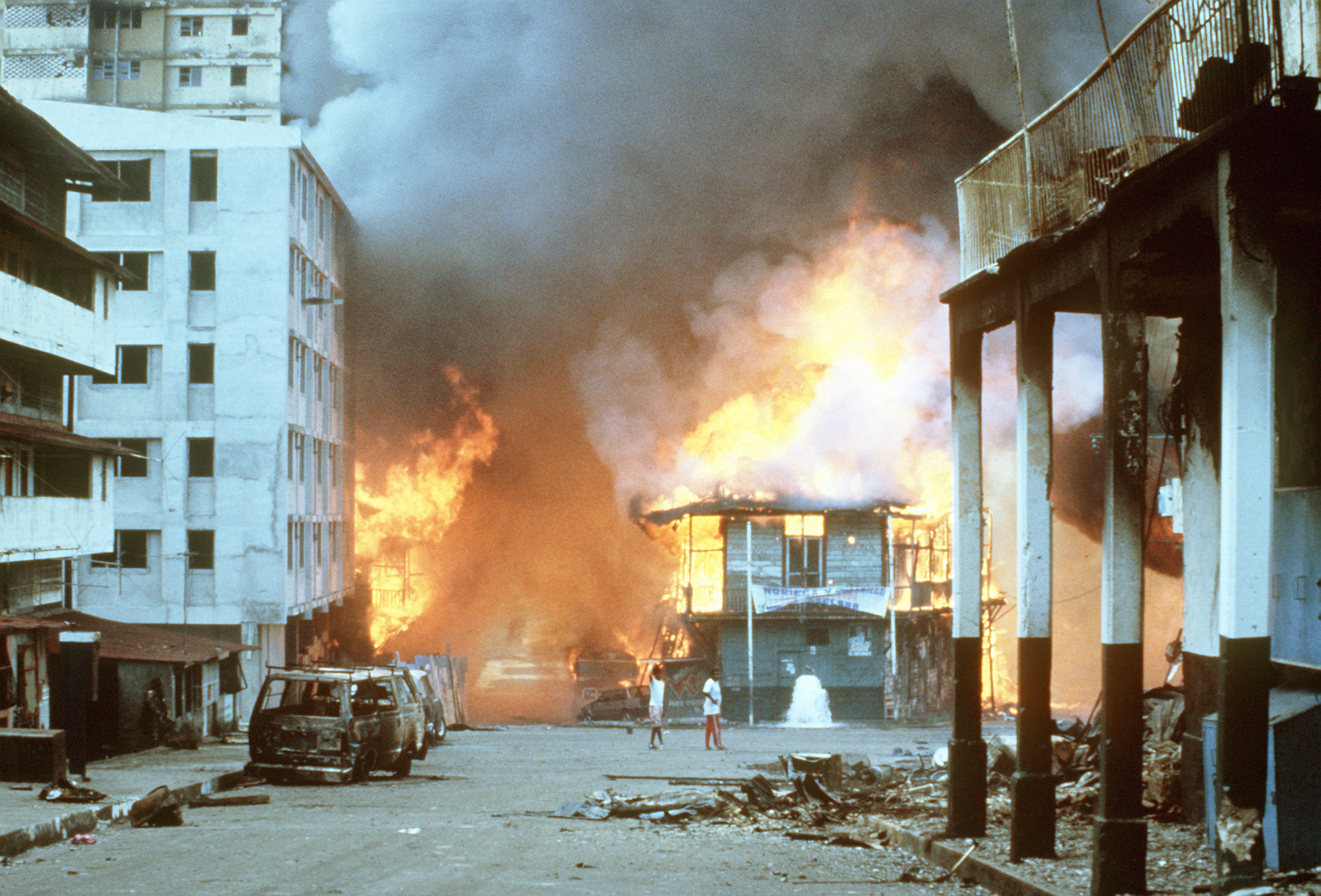
El Chorrillo was badly damaged by fighting. More than 20,000 Panamanians were displaced during the invasion, and disorder continued for nearly two weeks.

Guillermo Endara, in hiding, was sworn in as president by a judge on the night preceding the invasion. In later years, he staged a hunger strike, calling attention to the poverty and homelessness left in the wake of both the Noriega years and the destruction caused by the U.S. invasion.

On July 19, 1990, a group of sixty companies with operations in Panama filed a lawsuit against the U.S. government in Federal District Court in New York City, alleging that the invasion was "done in a tortious, careless and negligent manner with disregard for the property of innocent Panamanian residents". Most of the businesses had insurance, but the insurers either went bankrupt or refused to pay, claiming that acts of war were not covered.

About 20,000 people lost their homes and became refugees as a result of urban warfare. About 2,700 families displaced by the El Chorrillo fire were given $6,500 each by the U.S. to build a new house or apartment in selected areas in or near Panama City. However, numerous problems were reported with the new constructions just two years after the invasion.

Endara's government designated the first anniversary of the invasion a "national day of reflection". Hundreds of Panamanians marked the day with a "black march" through the streets of Panama City to denounce the invasion and Endara's economic policies. Protesters echoed claims that 3,000 people were killed as a result of U.S. military action. In the first four presidential elections after Noriega's ousting, candidates from opposing parties succeeded each other in the Palacio de las Garzas. On February 10, 1990, the Endara government abolished the PDF and reformed the security apparatus by creating the Panamanian Public Forces (PPF). In 1994, a constitutional amendment permanently abolished the military of Panama. Concurrent with a severe recession in Central America throughout the 1990s, Panama's GDP recovered by 1993, but very high unemployment remained a serious problem. As of 2001, Panama's press was still subject to numerous restrictions.

Noriega was brought to the U.S. to stand trial. He was subsequently convicted on eight counts of drug trafficking, racketeering, and money laundering and sentenced to 40 years in prison. His sentence was later reduced to 30 years. He died in Panama City on May 29, 2017, at the age of 83.

On December 20, 2015, Vice President Isabel De Saint Malo de Alvarado announced Panama's intention to form a special independent commission that would publish a report to mark the 26th anniversary of the invasion. The commission's goal would be to identify victims so that reparations could be paid to their families, as well as to establish public monuments and school curriculums to honor history and reclaim Panama's collective memory. Victims' families have claimed that past investigations into the invasion had been funded by U.S. authorities and therefore were biased.

== In popular culture ==
In 1992, the documentary titled The Panama Deception covered the invasion, winning the Academy Award for Best Documentary Feature. Due to its criticism of US government actions, PBS refused to broadcast the film.

The invasion is depicted in Noriega: God's Favorite, a 2000 biographical television film starring Bob Hoskins as Noriega.

The 2006 video action-adventure game Just Cause, about a CIA-backed operative attempting regime change on a fictional Latin American island nation, as well as its subsequent franchise, is inspired by and takes its name from the operation.

The invasion serves as the backdrop for the 1989 timeline in the 2012 video game Call of Duty: Black Ops II. During the mission "Suffer With Me," U.S. forces and Navy SEALs launch an assault to capture dictator Manuel Noriega, which acts as a cover for a covert CIA extraction. Whilst in prison for the murder of Spadafora, Noriega himself would sue Activision for using his name and likeness without permission, as well as for portraying him as "a kidnapper, murderer and enemy of the state." The case was dismissed after it was ruled the depiction was protected under free speech laws.

The 2018 film Diciembres depicts the invasion, utilizing archival footage in a story portraying the ghost of a journalist killed during the assault communicating with his family 10 years later. Operation Just Cause, a 2019 Panamanian film, depicts the invasion from the perspective of several Panamanian civilians and military personnel. The 2022 action film Panama, starring Mel Gibson and Cole Hauser, depicts the activities of CIA agents attempting to broker an arms deal shortly before the invasion.

== Timeline ==
=== 1987 ===
September 1987

- U.S. Senate passes resolution urging Panama to re-establish a civilian government. Panama protests alleged U.S. violations of the Torrijos–Carter Treaties.

November 1987

- U.S. Senate resolution cuts military and economic aid to Panama. Panamanians adopt resolution restricting U.S. military presence.

=== 1988 ===
February 1988

- Noriega indicted on drug-related charges. U.S. forces begin planning contingency operations in Panama (OPLAN Blue Spoon).

March 1988

- March 10: The U.S. House of Representatives approved a resolution calling on General Noriega to step down and Mr. Reagan to impose stiff economic sanctions.
- March 15: First of four deployments of U.S. forces begins providing additional security to U.S. installations.
- March 16: PDF officers attempt a coup against Noriega.

April 1988

- April 5: Additional U.S. forces deployed to provide security.
- April 9: Joint Task Force Panama activated.

=== 1989 ===
May 1989

- May 7: General election are held in Panama; opposition alliance tally shows their candidate, Guillermo Endara, beating Noriega's candidate, Carlos Duque, by a 3 to 1 margin. The election is declared invalid two days later by Noriega.
- May 11: President Bush orders 1,900 additional combat troops to Panama (Operation Nimrod Dancer).
- May 22: Convoys conducted to assert U.S. freedom of movement. Additional transport units travel from bases in the territorial U.S. to bases in Panama, and back, for this express purpose.

June–September 1989 (Operation Nimrod Dancer)

- U.S. begins conducting joint training and freedom of movement exercises (Operation Sand Flea and Operation Purple Storm). Additional transport units continue repeatedly traveling from bases in the territorial U.S. to bases in Panama, and back, for this express purpose.

October 1989 (Operation Nimrod Dancer)

- October 3: PDF, loyal to Noriega, defeat second coup attempt.

December 1989

- December 15: Noriega refers to himself as leader of Panama and declares that the U.S. is in a state of war with Panama.
- December 16: U.S. Marine lieutenant shot and killed by PDF. Navy lieutenant and wife detained and assaulted by PDF.
- December 17: NCA directs execution of Operation Just Cause.
- December 18: Army lieutenant shoots PDF sergeant. Joint Task Force South (JTFSO) advance party deploys. JCS designates D-Day/H-Hour as 20 December/1:00 a.m.
- December 19: U.S. forces alerted, marshalled, and launched.

D-Day, December 20, 1989

- U.S. invasion of Panama begins. The operation was conducted as a campaign with limited military objectives. JTFSO objectives in PLAN 90-2 were to: protect U.S. lives and key sites and facilities, capture and deliver Noriega to competent authority, neutralize PDF forces, neutralize PDF command and control, support establishment of a U.S.-recognized government in Panama, and restructure the PDF. Major operations detailed elsewhere continued through December 24.

=== 1990 ===
- JCS directs execution of Operation Promote Liberty.

January 3, 1990 (D-Day + 14)

- Noriega surrenders to U.S. forces in Panama City

January 31, 1990 (D-Day + 42)

- Operation Just Cause ends.
- Operation Promote Liberty begins.

=== 1994 ===
September 1994 (D-Day + approximately 4.5 years)

- Operation Promote Liberty ends.

== Major operations and involved U.S. units ==
=== Operations ===
All 27 objectives related to the Panamanian Defense Force were completed on D-Day, December 20, 1989. As initial forces moved to new objectives, follow-on forces from the 7th Infantry Division (L) moved into the western areas of Panama and into Panama City.

December 18, 1989 (D-Day – 2)

- SFODA-795/796 of Company C, 3rd Bn, 7th Special Forces Group (Airborne), part of Task Force Black, moves to Albrook Air Force Station as a forward element in preparation to secure the Panamanian President-elect Endara and his two vice presidents-elect, by force, if necessary.

December 19, 1989 (D-Day − 1)

- Company A, 1st Bn, 7th Special Forces Group (Airborne) – already deployed into Panama, along with 3rd Bn, 7th Special Forces Group (Airborne) – then permanently headquartered at Fort Davis, Panama, both elements of Task Force Black, moved to predetermined positions.
- Task Force Black receives Presidential cross-border authority message from President Bush.
- Company C, 3rd Battalion, 7th Special Forces Group (Airborne) is stood down from its mission to rescue of the duly elected Panamanian Presidency and awaits a new mission.
- 3d Bde, 7th Infantry Division (L) (4/17th Inf), already deployed as part of peacekeeping forces in the region, was deployed to predetermined positions.
- 2nd Bde, 7th Inf Div (L), was alerted for deployment. DRF 1 (5/21st Inf) and DRF 2 (2/27th INF) were deployed.
- Tow Platoon, HHC, 5/87th Inf (L), conducts pre-invasion recon of all objectives for Task Force Wildcat.

December 20, 1989 (D-Day)

- 3d Bde, 7th Infantry Division (L) (4/17th Inf) began operations in Colon City, the Canal Zone, and Panama City.
- The remainder of the 2d Bde was deployed and closed in Panama.
- Elements of 1st and 3rd Bn, 7th Special Forces Group (Airborne) conducted air assault and secured Pacora River Bridge preventing PDF reinforcements from reaching Omar Torrijos Airport and Panama City.
- The entire 75th Ranger Regiment, split into two elements (Team Black and Team Gold), conducted simultaneous parachute drops at Rio Hato Airfield, along with half the command and control of the HQ 75th RGR, the entire 2nd Battalion 75th RGR, and two companies from 3rd Battalion 75th, to neutralize PDF and Macho de Montes units present, seize the runway, and secure Manuel Noriega's beachside facility.
- The other half of HQ 75th RGR C&C, along with 1st Battalion 75th RGR and the remaining elements of 3rd Battalion 75th RGR, dropped into Omar Torrijos Airport to seize the runway and tower for follow-on operations by elements of the 82nd Airborne Division, deployed by C141 airdrop/airland elements of the 317th Combat Control Squadron, 507th Tactical Air Control Squadron.
- 193d Infantry Brigade (Light) assaulted PDF headquarters at La Commandancia, PDF Engineer Battalion, PDF 5th Company at Fort Amador, PDF units at Balboa and Ancon.
- 45 minutes after the 75th RGR RGT conducted their parachute drop onto Omar Torrijos Airport the 1st BDE 82 ABN DIV begins parachuting onto the airfield, and then assembles for movement to assigned follow on objectives.
- Company C, 3rd Battalion, 7th Special Forces Group (Airborne) conducts a daylight raid on Panama National Radio in downtown Panama City by fast-roping onto the roof of its 20-story building from MH-60 helicopters, destroying its FM broadcast capability. In a short turn around operation with 15 minutes warning and on order from the Joint Chiefs of Staff, the unit air assaults the Radio Panama AM radio transmitter site destroying the transmission tower and cutting off Noriega's final link to rally his supporters.

December 21, 1989 (D-Day + 1)

- JCS directed execution of Operation Promote Liberty (renamed from Plan Blind Logic).
- The Panama Canal reopened for daylight operations.
- Refugee situation became critical.
- C Company, 5th Battalion, 87th Infantry Regiment (193d Infantry Brigade) repelled a PDF counterattack at the PDF DNTT headquarters and rescued Panamanian Vice President Ford, whose convoy was also attacked.
- TF Bayonet began CMO in Panama City.
- Marriott Caesar Park Hotel was secured and hostages evacuated.

December 22, 1989 (D-Day + 2)

- FPP established.
- CMO and stability operations became primary focus.
- 2d Bde, 7th Inf Div (L), deployed to Rio Hato.
- 1st Bde (9th Regiment), 7th Inf Div (L), was alerted for deployment.

December 23, 1989 (D-Day + 3)

- International airport reopened.
- 2d Bde, 7th Inf Div (L) and SF elements began operations in west.
- 96th CA Bn assumed responsibility for DC Camp from USARSO.
- 1st Bde (9th Regiment) 7th Inf Div (L) closed in Panama.

December 24, 1989 (D-Day + 4)

- Noriega entered Papal Nunciatura.
- Money for Weapons program initiated.
- Combined U.S./FPP patrols began.

December 25, 1989 (D-Day + 5)

- Rangers secured Davíd.
- Operations in western Panama continued successfully.

January 3, 1990 (D-Day + 14)

- Noriega surrendered to U.S. forces.
- Combat and stability ops continue.

January 31, 1990 (D-Day + 42)

- Operation Just Cause ends.
- Operation Promote Liberty begins.

September 1994 (D-Day + approximately 4.5 years)

- Operation Promote Liberty ends.

=== Related operations ===
- Operation Acid Gambit: It was a U.S. Delta Force operation that retrieved Kurt Muse, an American expatriate living in Panama who had been arrested for leading a plot with other Panamanians to overthrow of the government of Panama, from the Cárcel Modelo, a notorious prison in Panama City.
- Operation Nifty Package: an operation which the Delta Force and SEALs undertook in order to capture Manuel Noriega or destroy his two escape routes: his private jet, located at Paitilla Airfield, was destroyed in the operation along with his gunboat, which was docked in a canal. Noriega surrendered to U.S. troops on January 3, 1990.
- Operation Nimrod Dancer: an operation which reinforced the forward-deployed U.S. forces with a brigade headquarters and an infantry battalion task force from the 7th Inf Div (L), a mechanized infantry battalion from the 5th Inf Div (M), and a U.S. Marine Corps Light Armored Infantry (LAI) Company. Augmentation continued with units rotating from both divisions under Operation Nimrod Sustain.
- Operation Prayer Book
- Operation Promote Liberty: an operation whose purpose was to rebuild the Panamanian military and Panama's civilian infrastructure.
- Operation Purple Storm: an operation whose purpose was to assert, display, and exercise U.S. freedom-of-movement rights, with convoys traveling both inside and outside Panama for that express purpose.
- Operation Sand Flea: an operation whose purpose was to exercise, display, and assert U.S. freedom-of-movement rights, with convoys traveling both inside and outside Panama for that express purpose.
- Raid at Renacer Prison: a military operation in which the prison was taken over and 64 prisoners were rescued.

== See also ==
- Foreign interventions by the United States
- History of Panama
- Panama–United States relations
- United States involvement in regime change
- List of United States invasions of Latin American countries
