= Peter Toon =

Anglican theologian

The Reverend Peter Toon
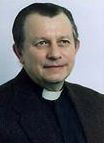
- Born: 1939; Yorkshire, England
- Died: 25 April 2009 (aged 69–70); San Diego, California, United States
- Occupations: Anglican priest, theologian and professor
- Known for: Books and teachings on theology

Peter Toon (1939 – 25 April 2009) was a priest and theologian and an international advocate of traditional Anglicanism.

== Early life and education ==
Toon was born to Thomas Arthur and Hilda Toon in Yorkshire, England, in 1939. His younger siblings were Paul, David and Christine.

He attended and graduated from the following schools and colleges:

- Hemsworth Grammar School, near Wakefield, Yorkshire
- Cliff College, near Sheffield
- King's College London (Bachelor of Divinity with upper second-class honours)
- University of Liverpool
- Christ Church, Oxford (DPhil)

== Career ==
After an earlier career as a college lecturer in religious studies, Toon was ordained deacon in 1973 and priest in 1974 in the Diocese of Liverpool (Church of England). He served a short title curacy in Skelmersdale (just over a year, compared with the usual requirement of three years), before taking a post in Oxford as Librarian of Latimer House, the headquarters and library of a conservative evangelical pressure group (subsequently the Latimer Trust, without property, but maintaining its library at Oak Hill Theological College, London) during which time he also served as curate of St Ebbe's, a central Oxford evangelical parish church. In 1976 he became a tutor at Oak Hill Theological College in London, training ordinands, and then from 1982 Director of Post-Ordination Training in the Diocese of St Edmundsbury and Ipswich in East Anglia. He returned briefly to parish ministry (Staindrop, County Durham) before moving to the United States of America in 1991. In the last decade of his working life, he served as president and CEO of the Prayer Book Society of the USA, and his life and work were centred in America, although he did return briefly to England, and was for four years the priest-in-charge of the villages of Biddulph Moor and Brown Edge in Staffordshire.

Toon wrote over 25 books, together with numerous booklets, essays and articles. He also engaged in internet authorship and discussion, contributing to these topical online discussions until his death.

== Style and beliefs ==
Toon's work repeatedly stressed the importance of the "Historic Formularies" of the Anglican tradition, defined in the Preface to the Declaration of Assent as "the Thirty-nine Articles of Religion, the Book of Common Prayer, and the Ordering of Bishops, Priests, and Deacons". His work was marked by clarity of presentation and strength of persuasion, attracting praise from supporters and critical attention from antagonists. He often wrote and spoke about the controversies in the Anglican Communion concerning issues of liturgical reform, the ordination of women, and the reception of homosexuals in the Church, on all of which he took a strong conservative line. With the widespread adoption of the new liturgies in the Church of England (Alternative Service Book 1980, and then Common Worship 2000) and similar liturgical resources in other provinces (notably the 1979 Book of Common Prayer of the Episcopal Church of the United States of America), Toon became a notable spokesman and theological advocate for the strong minority lobby favouring traditionalist views, and the retention of the seventeenth-century liturgies of the (original) Book of Common Prayer.

== Personal life ==
He was married to Vita for forty-seven years. Vita graduated from London and Oxford universities. They had one daughter, Deborah, who is married to a naval officer and lives in California. Deborah graduated from Vanderbilt University in Nashville, and the University of Texas at Austin.

Toon died on 25 April 2009, in San Diego, California. The cause of death was amyloidosis, a rare auto-immune disease, which he had been battling for some months. There was a private family funeral in California followed by a public memorial service organised by the Prayer Book Society of the USA at All Saints' Church, Wynnewood, Pennsylvania on 24 July 2009.

== Bibliography ==
- The Oxford Orations of Dr. John Owen. Ed. Peter Toon. Trans. [from the Latin] supervised by John Glucker. Callington (Cornwall): Gospel Communication. 1971. ISBN 978-0-9501252-1-3.
- Evangelical Theology 1833–1856: a response to Tractarianism London: Marshall, Morgan and Scott 1979
- God's Statesman: the Life and Work of John Owen Exeter: Paternoster Press 1971
- Peter Toon and Michael Smout J C Ryle – Evangelical Bishop Cambridge: James Clark 1976
- Puritans and Calvinism Swengel, Pennsylvania: Reiner Publications 1973
- The Emergence of Hyper-calvinism in English Nonconformity 1689–1765. London: The Olive Tree 1967
- Correspondence of John Owen Ed. Peter Toon Cambridge: James Clark 1970
- Peter Toon (ed) Puritans, the Millennium and the Future of Israel Cambridge: James Clark 1970
- God's Church for Today (Christian Faith for Today Series) Westchester, Ill.: Crossway Books 1979 ISBN 9780891071839 Reprint. Eugene, Ore.: Wipf & Stock 2018 ISBN 9781532644009
- Justification and Sanctification London: Marshall, Morgan and Scott 1983; Westchester, Ill.: Crossway Books 1983. Reprint. Eugene, Ore.: Wipf & Stock 2018. ISBN 9781532644177
- Peter Toon The Anglican Way: Evangelical and Catholic. Wilton, Conn.: Morehouse-Barlow 1983. ISBN 0-8192-1330-6
- Peter Toon The End of Liberal Theology: Contemporary Challenges to Evangelical Orthodoxy. Wheaton, Ill.: Crossway Books 1995. ISBN 9780891078333
- Peter Toon Our Triune God: A Biblical Portrayal of the Trinity. Wheaton, Ill.: BridgePoint/Victor Books 1996. ISBN 9781564765536 Reprint. Vancouver, B.C.: Regent College Publishing 2002. ISBN 9781573832267
- Heaven and Hell: A Biblical and Theological Overview. Nashville: Thomas Nelson, 1986. ISBN 9780840759672
