= Operation Prayer Book =

1988 series of military plans

Prayer Book was a series of military plans operations in Panama drawn up beginning in April 1988 as relations between the United States and Panama deteriorated. The operation consisted of four separate operations: Klondike Key, Post Time, Blue Spoon, and Blind Logic. Originally, these operations were all parts of one operation named Elaborate Maze. Prayer Book also included Operation Elder Statesman, Operation Krystal Ball, and Operation Purple Storm.

== Blue Spoon ==
See Operation Blue Spoon/Just Cause
