= Carlos Duque =

Panamanian businessman and politician (1930–2014)

- Born: Carlos Alberto Duque Jaén; March 12, 1930; Panama City, Panama
- Died: October 31, 2014 (aged 84); Panama City, Panama
- Occupations: Businessman, politician
- Political party: Democratic Revolutionary Party (PRD)

Carlos Alberto Duque Jaén (March 12, 1930 – October 31, 2014) was a Panamanian businessman and politician who was President-for-Life of Panama's Partido Revolucionario Democrático (PRD). He was a presidential candidate for the PRD in the 1989 presidential election.

== 1989 presidential candidacy ==
A former business partner of military ruler Manuel Noriega, Duque was selected by Noriega to head the pro-Noriega Democratic Revolutionary Party (PRD) in 1988. The following year, he stood as the party's presidential candidate. Future PRD president Ernesto Pérez Balladares served as his campaign manager.

Duque's primary rival for the presidency, Guillermo Endara, ran atop the ticket of the Democratic Alliance of Civic Opposition (ADOC), a coalition of parties opposed to Noriega. After the voting concluded, international observers reported that Endara's coalition was leading by a 3-to-1 margin, but the results were annulled by the Noriega government before counting was complete. Noriega had planned to declare Duque the winner regardless of the actual results. However, by this time Duque knew he had been comprehensively defeated by Endara and refused to go along.

The next day, Endara and one of his running mates, Guillermo Ford, were badly beaten by a detachment of Dignity Battalions, a paramilitary group supporting Noriega. Endara was struck with an iron club and was briefly hospitalized, receiving eight stitches. Images of the attack on Endara and Ford were carried by media around the world, and were credited with leading up to the US invasion that would soon follow.

== Post-election career ==
Duque was an opponent of the 1989 US invasion of Panama which deposed Noriega, calling it "the biggest error" and urging "nationalist parties" to battle US forces. Several months after the invasion, US federal prosecutors accused Duque's company, Transit S.A., of funneling millions of dollars in kickbacks to the former ruler from a coffee-smuggling operation.

In 1999, he worked on the campaign of PRD presidential candidate Martín Torrijos, son of former military ruler Omar Torrijos. Martín Torrijos lost the presidential election that year to Mireya Moscoso, but went on to win in 2004.
