= Prayer Book Society (England) =

The Prayer Book Society is a charity in England which states that it aims to see "people of all ages finding life in Christ through a growing Prayer Book service in every benefice". Its legal constitution states that it is established "for the advancement of the Christian religion as set forth in the Book of Common Prayer; and, in furtherance of this Object, for the promotion of the worship and doctrine enshrined in the Book of Common Prayer and its use for services, teaching and training throughout the Church of England and other Churches in the Anglican tradition".

== Activity ==
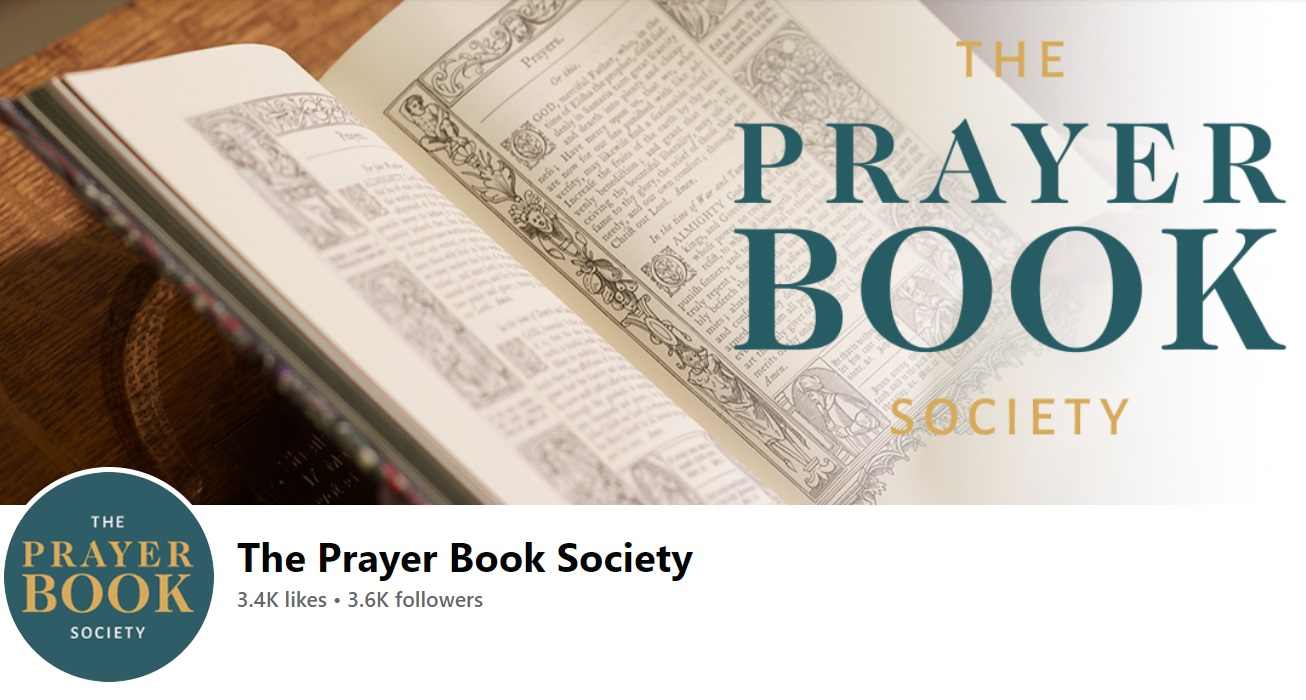
The Prayer Book Society has an active social media presence.

The Prayer Book Society was founded in 1972 as the Book of Common Prayer Action Group, following a small public meeting at Commander and Mrs Charles Drage's Kensington house. Anthony Kilmister OBE was prominent amongst the founders of the group, which began as a conservative and sometimes controversialist reaction to proposals to outlaw or at least marginalise the Book of Common Prayer.

The Society came to have branches in every Church of England diocese and through letter writing, meetings, and other activities it took part in debates which led to the Prayer Book being retained, albeit used increasingly less often than first Alternative Service Book and then Common Worship forms of service.

In 2001 the society adopted a corporate structure and in 2012 the Charity Commission for England and Wales permitted the society to simplify its objects in order to allow it to undertake a number of new activities closely related to its previous work.

As the Church of England's authorities were seen to take a less aggressive line towards the Prayer Book, the Prayer Book Society's emphasis shifted away from protest to positive promotion of the Prayer Book and building up of those who valued it. The society runs the Cranmer Awards to encourage school children to engage with the Psalms. It runs a popular annual residential conference and retreat. It produces and publicises print and online video material to encourage use and understanding of the Prayer Book. It publishes a members magazine and a more academic journal, Faith and Worship. It sponsors academic research. It distributes copies of the Prayer Book and Bishop Paul Thomas's 'How to Use the Book of Common Prayer' to ordinands training for ministry. It has set up a Prayer Books for Choristers scheme. It distributes new Prayer Books to parish churches struggling with costs. During the COVID-19 pandemic, it began to offer regular online events, starting with a day conference entitled 'In Time of Plague and Sickness'.

From 2006 to 2020 the society was chaired by Prudence Dailey, who was awarded an MBE in the Queen's Platinum Jubilee honours list. She was succeeded by Bradley Smith.

King Charles III has served as patron of the PBS since the year 2000, and the ecclesiastical patron is Richard Chartres, the former Bishop of London who is the last Church of England bishop to date to have been made a bishop in a Prayer Book service.

The society has branches in Wales and in Ireland. It is a sister society of the Prayer Book Society of the USA, the Prayer Book Society of Canada, the Scottish Prayer Book Society, and the Prayer Book Society in Australia.

Effective March 2026, the permanent full-time Chief Executive Officer of the Prayer Book Society will be lay Church of England member Diana Cheal.

== Membership ==
The Prayer Book Society has thousands of members, including more than 150 corporate members, most of which are Church of England church councils and congregations. These include:

- All Saints, Margaret Street
- The Chapel of Hampton Court Palace
- All Saints' Church, Lullington
- St Andrew's Church, Covehithe
- St Bartholomew-the-Great
- Christ Church with St Ewen
- St Laurence's Church, Winslow
- St Michael, Cornhill
- St Mary's Church, Hull
- St Giles-in-the-Fields, London
- Sancreed Parish Church, Sancreed, Cornwall
- Prayer Book Society corporate members map
