= Prayer Book Society of the USA =

Anglican organization in the United States

The Prayer Book Society of the USA (PBS USA), officially the Society for the Preservation of the Book of Common Prayer, seeks to maintain the Anglican tradition of liturgical common prayer and promote the use and understanding of traditional versions of the Book of Common Prayer such as the American edition of 1928.

It has EIN 62–0873533 as a 501(c)(3) Public Charity; in 2024 it claimed total revenue of $92,293 and total assets of $113,790. In 2019, it claimed total revenue of $134,500 and total assets of $505,493. It is a separate organization from the similarly named Bible and Common Prayer Book Society of the Episcopal Church.

The late Peter Toon was formerly the president of the society. The current president is the Revd Gavin Dunbar, Rector of St John's Church in Savannah, Georgia.

Among its activities are an annual conference and the publication of The Anglican Way, a magazine devoted to the study of the history and fundamental character of Anglicanism.

== See also ==
- Prayer Book Society (England)
- Prayer Book Society of Canada
