= Prayer Book Society of Canada =

Anglican interest group

- Abbreviation: PBSC
- Formation: 1986
- Purpose: Promotion of the use of the Book of Common Prayer
- Location: Canada
- Chairman: Gordon Maitland
- Website: prayerbook.ca

The Prayer Book Society of Canada (PBSC), founded in 1986, is an organization of Canadian Anglicans encompassing members who are affiliated with both the Anglican Church of Canada and other jurisdictions such as the Anglican Diocese of Canada and the Anglican Catholic Church of Canada. The Society promotes “the understanding and use of the Book of Common Prayer (BCP) as a spiritual system of nurture for life in Christ” and upholds it as the standard of doctrine and worship for Canadian Anglicans. It primarily supports the use of the 1962 Canadian edition of the BCP, and aims to encourage greater awareness and wider use of it through the publication of liturgical resources in print and online, advocacy to and collaboration with like-minded organizations and the broader church, and the provision of financial aid to theological students and parishes.

== History ==
The Canadian Book of Alternative Services (BAS) was introduced within the Anglican Church of Canada in 1985. The explanatory essays which preface the liturgies contained in it consistently presented them as a departure from the tradition of the Book of Common Prayer, which caused friction between those who valued the spiritual and doctrinal tradition of the Prayer Book, and clergy who introduced the BAS into parish worship, sometimes to the point of entirely replacing the BCP.

In response, a fledgling Prayer Book Society of Canada was organized in Toronto early in 1986. It placed advertisements in diocesan and national church newspapers, outlining the issues at hand and inviting readers to join the organization. A regular newsletter was established to enable networking among like-minded people, to assist them with making their concerns known, to provide resources about the history and theology of the BCP, and to share information on the Society’s efforts to engage with church officials. Membership in the Society grew steadily, and branches began to be founded across the country to hold events for local members and to represent the Society at the diocesan level. By 1992 the number of branches had grown to 26, and by 1993 the Society’s membership stood at over 11,000, making it the second largest lay organization in the Anglican Church of Canada (after the Anglican Church Women).

In 1994 the PBSC partnered with Barnabas Anglican Ministries and Anglican Renewal Ministries to form the Essentials Coalition, whose stated mission was “to call the Anglican Church of Canada to embrace and live by its orthodox Christian heritage under the renewing guidance of the Holy Spirit”. The coalition continued its networking and advocacy over the next decade, producing a book of essays and other literature, and organizing various events. Differing views between those who wished to remain within the Anglican Church of Canada and those who wanted to align with more theologically conservative Anglican provinces in the Global South led in 2005 to the disbanding of the coalition and the formation of two new organizations, the Anglican Communion Alliance and the Anglican Network in Canada, which respectively pursued these two strategies. The PBSC maintained its independent existence during and after this period.

In recent years the Society has expanded its efforts with a rebuilt website offering various educational and liturgical resources, a quarterly electronic mailout and an active Facebook page.

== Beliefs ==
The PBSC affirms the rationale for the BCP which Thomas Cranmer described in the Preface to its first edition in 1549: that the liturgies of the Western church had gradually been corrupted throughout medieval times, and that the Prayer Book restored them to their original biblical purity, while also translating and adapting them so that they could be more accessible to both clergy and laity. Although the Prayer Book is fundamentally a book of worship whose purpose is to provide biblical and traditional structure to public and private prayer, the PBSC believes that the Prayer Book liturgies also teach doctrines, and that these doctrines are relevant to the church today. In addition, the PBSC seeks to promote the Prayer Book as a key element of the “formularies” or constitution of the church, arguing that its creeds, exhortations, rubrics, and other directives (like the obligation of clergy to recite Morning and Evening Prayer daily) having binding canonical force upon Canadian Anglicans. The PBSC as an organization does not endorse a “high church” or “low church” interpretation of the Prayer Book and has neither supported nor condemned the decision of some Anglicans to form new jurisdictions outside of the Anglican Church of Canada, although individual members are at liberty to maintain their own views.

== Major Projects and Initiatives ==
- Produced a 107-page submission responding to questions posed by the Sub-Group on Theological Issues of the BAS Evaluation Commission, 1991.
- Initiated an ongoing bursary programme for divinity students, 1991.
- Published an occasional journal, The Machray Review, containing various theological essays, articles and sermons, 1992-1998.
- Organized a four-day Western Theological Conference, modelled on the long-standing Atlantic Theological Conference, featuring speakers from across North America. The Conference was held in Kelowna in 1995, in Calgary in 1996, and in Vancouver in 1998.
- Commissioned a booklet, What Happened to Morning Prayer: the Service of the Word as a Principal Sunday Liturgy, co-authored by Alan Hayes and John Webster, and published by Wycliffe College in Toronto, 1997.
- Sponsored “Parish Alive!”, an organization producing online and DVD teaching resources for parishes, 2003-2006.
- Commissioned a three-volume set of books, Discovering the Book of Common Prayer: A Hands-On Approach, authored by journalist and writer Sue Careless. Volume I, Daily Prayer, and Volume II, Our Life in the Church, were co-published with the Anglican Book Centre in 2003 and 2006, and Volume III, Special Occasions was co-published with St. Peter Publications in 2009.
- Organized the Cranmer Conference, a weekend event for young people featuring worship, teaching and recreation, held at various locations in Ontario, 2006-2011.
- Made representation to the decadal Lambeth Conference of worldwide Anglican bishops, together with the Prayer Book Societies of England and the USA, 2008.
- Commissioned the production of “622”, a four-year teen education curriculum for use in parishes, 2016-2019.
- Produced the “Common Prayer Canada” app, enabling users to access the set daily forms of prayer according to the BCP for any day of the year, 2020.

== Governance ==
The Society is governed by a National Council, made up of national officers (a chairman, up to five vice-chairmen, a treasurer, a recording secretary and a membership secretary), the presidents of the local branches, and up to twenty councillors. Each year the members of the National Council elect the national officers, who may be nominated by any member of the Society. The councillors are elected at the Society’s Annual General Meeting.

== Book of Common Prayer ==
The Book of Common Prayer (BCP) used in Canada was originally compiled in 1962 and is a national expression of a tradition of Christian worship stemming from the original Book of Common Prayer published by the Church of England in 1549. The original 1549 BCP was itself a revision of the medieval forms of worship in use within the English Church prior to the Reformation. The BCP simplified older forms and made the Bible itself the standard of all Christian worship.

The BCP contains in one volume what previously had been contained in many separate tomes: The Daily Offices (which are the Church's daily Morning Prayer and Evening Prayer), the Liturgy of the Holy Communion, the Ordinal (services for the ordinations of bishops, priests, and deacons), as well as many other services of the Church such as the Penitential Rite (used on Ash Wednesday), and the Baptism services.

== See also ==
- Prayer Book Society (England)
- Prayer Book Society of the USA
