= Julie Fisher =

Julie Fisher may refer to:

- Julie D. Fisher, American diplomat
- Julie Montagu, Countess of Sandwich (born Julie Jean Fisher, 1972), American blogger and television personality

== See also ==
- Joely Fisher (born 1967), American actress and singer
- Julia Fischer (born 1983), German classical violinist and pianist
- Julia Martz-Fisher (born 1968), American jurist
- Jules Fisher (born 1937), American lighting designer
- Jules G. Fisher (1874–1943), Louisiana politician
