= TJ High School =

TJ High School may refer to:

- Any school named Thomas Jefferson High School
- Governor Thomas Johnson High School, Frederick, Maryland
