= 2006 Panama Canal expansion referendum =

Panamanian referendum which expanded the Panama Canal

- 22 October 2006
- Do you approve the proposal to build the third set of locks in the Panama Canal?
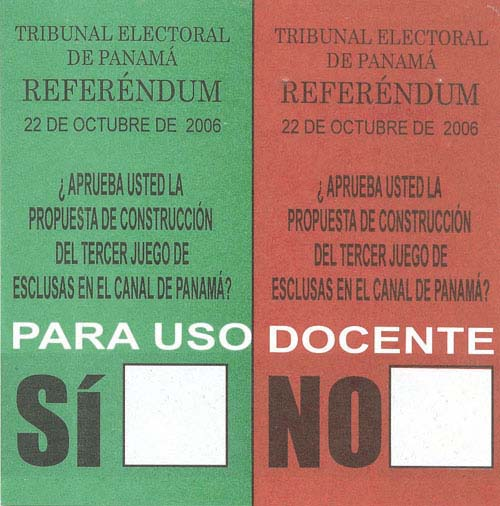
- Ballot used in the referendum

Results
Choice	Votes	%
Yes	705,144	77.80%
No	201,247	22.20%
Valid votes	906,391	98.09%
Invalid or blank votes	17,638	1.91%
Total votes	924,029	100.00%
Registered voters/turnout	2,132,842	43.32%

A referendum on expansion of the Panama Canal was held in Panama on October 22, 2006. The proposal was approved by 78% of voters.

== Constitutional background ==
According to article 325 of the Panamanian Constitution, any proposal for the construction of a third set of locks or a sea-level Canal on the existing route that the Panama Canal Authority (ACP) proposes has to be approved by the executive branch and submitted to the National Assembly for its approval or rejection. It also has to be submitted to a national referendum no earlier than three months after its approval by the National Assembly.

== Proposal ==
The Panama Canal expansion proposal was presented on April 24, 2006 by President Martín Torrijos to the Panamanian people after years of study by the ACP. The largest project at the Canal since its original construction, the expansion doubled its capacity and allowed more traffic.

The project created a new lane of traffic along the Canal through the construction of a new set of locks. Details of the project included the following integrated components:

- The construction of two lock complexes, one on the Atlantic side and another on the Pacific side, each with three chambers, which include three water-saving basins;
- The excavation of new access channels to the new locks and the widening of existing navigational channels; and
- The deepening of the navigation channels and the elevation of Gatún Lake's maximum operating level.

According to the ACP, the project had an estimated cost of US$5.25 billion, would be self-financed by tolls increase and would take up to 7 or 8 years of construction time.

Panama's Cabinet approved the project, and on July 14, the National Assembly unanimously approved the proposal to expand the Canal. In addition, the Assembly created and passed a law mandating a national referendum in which the people of Panama would vote to approve expansion. The referendum was held on October 22, 2006, the first Sunday at least 90 days after the legislation was signed.

== Referendum question ==
The referendum used a single ballot divided in half with Sí (Yes) at the left with a green background and No at the right with a red background. Above these two options the text of the question read:

Do you approve the proposal of construction of a Third Set of Locks on the Panama Canal?

== Campaign ==
Opposition to the project was vigorous as skeptics questioned the government's cost estimates and raised fears that corruption would doom the project. But the government's campaign for the expansion, the largest modernization of the canal in its history, was even more intense. Officials portrayed a "sí" vote as a vote for the children of Panama. Without an expanded canal, officials predicted, shipping traffic would find other routes and Panama's growing economy would dry up.

== Polls ==
The dates listed are normally the date the survey was concluded, not the date it was published. Most news and political affairs sources use the convention of using the last date that the poll was conducted in order to establish the inclusion/exclusion of current events. Only polls after the proposal unveiling (April 24, 2006) are included.

Polling Firm	Date	Link	Yes	No	Undecided
Dichter & Neira	October 8, 2006	PDF	79%	21%	
PSM Sigma Dos	October 3, 2006	HTML	72%	21%	7%
CID Gallup	October 2, 2006	HTML	77%	10%	13%
PSM Sigma Dos	September 6, 2006	HTML	66%	23%	11%
Dichter & Neira	September 3, 2006	HTML	63.9%	24.8%	11.3%
Dichter & Neira	September 3, 2006	HTML	62.7%	33.7%	3.6%
Dichter & Neira	August 6, 2006	HTML	54.4%	17.1%	28.5%
PSM Sigma Dos	July 10, 2006	HTML	66%	23%	11%
Dichter & Neira	June 4, 2006	HTML	57.9%	19.8%	22.3%
Dichter & Neira	May 8, 2006	HTML	57.3%	27.2%	15.5%

1. This poll was done as a simulated referendum, using a similar ballot to the one used on the October 22 referendum, having a secret vote. People that said that they were definitely not going to vote (16%) were excluded from this simulation. This exercise had no null or blank votes.
2. In this poll the question was made out loud and the answer was registered.
3. This time the same people were asked to make a simulated vote too. People that said they were not going to vote on the referendum were excluded (7.8%).

The margin of error in these surveys is typically between 2 and 2.9%. See the links for actual error values associated with particular surveys.

== Voting ==
The voting process went smoothly, without major events that could tamper the results. The voter turnout was low, 43.32%. Voting took place on schedule from 7am to 4pm but people still in line at that time were allowed to vote. Unofficial results were made known by the Electoral Tribunal by its system of unofficial results reporting, just 30 minutes after the voting ended. This system consists of series of data-collecting centers that communicate with the Panama City Press Room of the Electoral Tribunal. The centers receive the unofficial results given by each polling station by phone, cell phone and other means, while the official results begin their journey to the different counting centers. Under this system, by 6 p.m. (2 hours after the voting ended) the results of approximately 25% of polling stations were available and the likely approval of the project was known. However, the official results were the responsibility of the National Scrutiny Junta, and that took three days as official declarations came from all over the country to Panama City.

== Results ==
Choice	Votes	%
For	705,144	77.80
Against	201,247	22.20
Invalid/blank votes	17,638	–
Total	924,029	100
Registered voters/turnout	2,132,842	43.32
Source: Direct Democracy

== Reactions ==
- President Martín Torrijos said this was the most important decision this generation had to take. He considered the decision an opportunity that has to include all Panamanians, the ones that voted Yes, the ones that voted No, the ones that decided not to vote and the ones too young to vote.
- Taiwan congratulated Panama on its referendum result and offered to participate in the expansion of the Panama Canal.
- The trade organization Dansk Rederiforening (the Danish Shipping Council) was pleased with the decision to expand the Panama Canal and believed that the expansion would be positive both to the Danish and the international shipping industry.
- U.S. Ambassador William A. Eaton said that "There will be an impact on the pocketbook. The transit costs will be cheaper, and that will have an effect on the market. This is important to the U.S. It's important to our economy".
- John LaRue, executive director of the U.S. port of Corpus Christi, Texas, said "The (canal project) just improves trade, the West Coast ports have grown dramatically because of all the Asian cargo. Routing ships to the Gulf would save the West Coast's infrastructure and benefit us as all. I don't see any negatives."
- Fitch Ratings stated that the approval of the Panama Canal expansion referendum could yield positive results for the country in the long term in terms of higher external and fiscal receipts and GDP growth prospects. However, the referendum itself would not have an immediate impact on Panama's sovereign ratings, as uncertainties remained about debt financing, future revenues from tolls, and Panama's ongoing fiscal consolidation.
