= Jefferson Seaway =

The Jefferson Seaway was a proposed deep-draft ship channel to be created in Jefferson Parish, Louisiana, that would establish a route between the Mississippi River at Westwego and the Gulf of Mexico near Grand Isle. The Mississippi River provided the only deep-water access to New Orleans and its neighboring ports. In the mid-20th century, the creation of alternate routes was considered, including the Mississippi River-Gulf Outlet (MR-GO), which was ultimately selected, funded and constructed. The Jefferson Seaway, sometimes referred to as the Arrow to the Americas, the Mississippi Valley Seaway Canal, the Tidewater Ship Canal and the Barataria Canal, was also under consideration but ultimately was never constructed as a deep-draft channel.

== Early concepts ==
In the absence of man-made channels, the only deep draft route leading to the City of New Orleans is by way of the Mississippi River. Prior to the 1870s, shoaling of sediment at the river delta presented draft restrictions that limited available water depth to between 18 and 20 feet, which was less than the draft of comparable import and export harbors in the United States and Europe.

The U.S. Army Corps of Engineers considered the construction of a channel to the east of the Mississippi River but instead accepted an alternative proposed by James Buchanan Eads. Eads proposed the construction of parallel jetties that would concentrate the flow of the river thereby scouring the bottom and maintaining deeper depths. Construction began in 1875 and was completed by 1879. As a result of the newly established jetties, river depth was maintained at 30 feet, thereby reducing the problem of shoaling.

Competing with Eads jetty concept was the idea of a man-made ship channel as proposed by Capt. John Cowdon. In May 1876, the Daily Picayune reported on Eads construction progress in detail but also reported about Capt. Cowdon's plans for an alternate project to construct a ship channel along the Barataria that he prepared for the Atlantic and Mississippi Valley Canal and Improvement Company.

The following year, in 1877, Capt. Cowdon presented his plan to The Property Holders Association of New Orleans in an address, "The Barataria Ship Canal and its Importance to the Valley of the Mississippi". Capt. Cowdon expressed doubt as to the success of Eads jetties, which were still under construction, and pressed for the concept of a ship canal to be constructed independent of the river along Bayou Barataria. Capt. Cowdon cited cost estimates and freight statistics in support of his plan, which had already been explored by engineers who were in favor of the proposal. Cowdon believed that Eads' jetties was an experiment bringing only a temporary fix and thought the year-to-year costs of maintenance would prove that his permanent solution of a Barataria Ship Canal was superior.

In reaction to decades of competing and conflicting directions regarding flood-control and navigation, the U.S. Congress passed the Mississippi River Commission Act in 1879. The commission would have seven members, including three from the U.S. Army Corps of Engineers (USACE) and three from civilian life. The Mississippi River Commission (MRC) acted as an executive body reporting directly to the Secretary of War.

The success of Eads jetties following its completion temporarily quieted cries for a man-made ship channel, but Cowdon's project would not be forgotten.

== Shallow draft projects ==
Two navigation projects were completed along the proposed Jefferson Seaway route that provided shallow-draft navigation.

The U.S. Federal Government passed the River and Harbors Act of 1919, which authorized the creation of a shallow-draft channel to be dredged from Lake Salvador at Bayou Villars to Barataria Pass at Grand Isle. The channel was authorized to be 5 feet deep by 50 feet wide and would combine existing canals and passages with newly dredged canals through marshland. The newly created Barataria Bay Waterway, which parallels Barataria Island and traverses through Barataria Bay, was 37 miles in length when completed in 1925. A portion of this waterway is referred to as Dupree Cut. This would represent the first instance of straightening and dredging along the route that was proposed for the Jefferson Seaway.

In the 1920s, plans for the Gulf Intracoastal Water Way (GIWW) were underway, which would provide a sheltered coastal route for shallow-draft vessels. In the vicinity of New Orleans, existing infrastructure was incorporated into the route. The western entrance into the Mississippi River would be via the Inner Harbor Navigation Canal and lock, completed in 1923. The eastern entrance would be via the Harvey Canal. Its original locks were replaced as part of the GIWW project and construction was completed in 1934. An alternate western entrance to the Mississippi River and route was added via the Algiers Canal and lock, completed in 1956, which merged with the existing GIWW route 6 miles from the Harvey locks.

Oil and gas exploration and production near and below Lafitte, initially by the Texas Company in 1935, prompted the need for greater depths for river barges to access the fields from the GIWW and Gulf of Mexico. Beginning in 1949, Jefferson Parish presented a plan for enlarging the Barataria Bay Waterway channel to 12 feet in depth by 125 feet in width. U.S. Congressman Hale Boggs backed a bill that provided federal funding for the project, which was authorized in the Rivers and Harbors Act of 1958. The deepening and widening of the Barataria Bay Waterway was completed in 1960, representing the second instance of widening and deepening the proposed route of the Jefferson Seaway.

== Concept resurrection ==
In 1933, the Westwego Canal and Company, Inc. presented its "Prospectus of New Orleans Ship Canal, Inc.", a document signed by its president, William T. Nolan, and vice president, F. Rivers Richardson. The prospectus specifically resurrected Capt. Cowan's proposal from a half-century before and included a map titled "Location Chart - New Orleans Ship Canal Incorporated", showing a straight path for a ship channel between the Mississippi River at Westwego and Grand Isle. The prospectus referenced attached letters from John Devereaux O'Reilly, "builder of the Industrial Canal and locks," a reference to the IHNC. The prospectus acknowledged the success of Eads jetties but noted that commerce had since outgrown its limitations. Three potential routes were noted. The first referred to the MRC's idea to dredge a channel east from Pilot Town. The second was through the Industrial Canal and then through Lake Pontchartrain and Lake Borgne out into the Mississippi Sound, a concept that was a forerunner to the MR-GO. The third route was the focus of the Prospectus, which was the Westwego–Grand Isle route.

In May 1936, Louisiana Senator Jules G. Fisher of Jefferson Parish filed a resolution urging for the digging of a ship canal that would connect Grand Isle with the Intracoastal canal and the Westwego canal.

== Competing federal deep draft projects ==
In 1943, two separate deep draft projects were presented by the Ship Channel Committee of the Jefferson Parish Police Jury and by the Dock Board of New Orleans to the U.S. Army Corps of Engineers.

The New Orleans proposed route, referred to as the "Alexander Seaway", was east of the Mississippi River, and named for Col. Lester F. Alexander, a marine contractor, member of the Dock Board and chairman of the Tidewater Development Association, serving as one of the architects behind the New Orleans plan. The New Orleans route was an extension of previous plans for the Industrial Canal (IHNC), which included an eventual ship outlet into Lake Borne and the Mississippi sound.

Jefferson's proposed route, referred to as the "Arrow to the Americas", was west of the Mississippi River and essentially an evolution of Capt. James Cowdon's plans from 1874 as outlined in the New Orleans Ship Canal Prospectus issued 10 years prior.

The Jefferson Seaway was envisioned as a channel measuring either 500 feet or 600 feet in width, 40 feet in depth and 55 miles in length, compared to the 110-mile distance presented by the Mississippi River as measured from the entrance at the jetties. This route was shorter than the Alexander Seaway project, which measured 76 miles in length. A new four-lane toll highway was associated with the Jefferson Seaway project, which would parallel the full length of the new ship channel between Westwego and Grand Isle.

In order to connect to the Mississippi River, the Jefferson Seaway project required the construction of new navigable locks at Westwego. Locks at this location had previously been constructed ca. 1870 by the Texas and Pacific Railroad as part of the Company Canal, which connected Bayou Segnette to the Mississippi River. These locks were condemned and ultimately closed by the U.S. Army Corps of Engineers in 1956, coinciding with the opening of the newly completed Algiers canal and locks.

Shipping and commerce in the Gulf of Mexico is influenced by the capacity of the nearby Panama Canal, which provides access to the Pacific Ocean. The original Panama Canal Locks, completed in 1914, were 110 feet wide and 1,050 feet long with 41.2 ft of draft above the sill. The locks proposed for the Jefferson Seaway project would have been 80 feet in width by 800 feet in length with 40 feet of draft over the sill. Though smaller, Jefferson's locks would have allowed for comparable ship drafts.

The Jefferson Seaway proposal claimed several advantages over the competing project, including a significantly shorter route, direct access to the oil and gas of the Texaco Company Lafitte Field, access to the Freeport Sulphur Grand Ecaille mines, being closer to Central and South America, and less expensive land appropriation costs.

== Project selection ==
In considering the most viable option between the Jefferson Seaway and the Alexander Seaway, the USACE New Orleans District initially preferred the Jefferson project. However, upon its review of the District's findings, the USACE Vicksburg Division returned the report with recommendations to utilize the existing Inner Harbor Navigation Canal (IHNC) locks to connect the Alexander Seaway project to the Mississippi River. Completed in 1926, the IHNC locks measured 75 feet in width by 640 feet in length with 31 feet of draft over the sill, significantly smaller than both the Panama Canal Locks and the proposed Jefferson Seaway locks.

Without the need for new locks, the Alexander Seaway project, on paper, presented a more economical option despite its greater overall length and lesser lock capacity and was subsequently chosen. The Louisiana Legislature in 1944 empowered the governor to aid the federal government in completing the tidewater seaway proposed on the east side of the river. That same year, the USACE assumed operational control of the IHNC locks from the Dock Board of New Orleans.

Local Jefferson officials continued to pursue the proposed Jefferson Seaway although the Alexander Seaway appeared to be the optioned favored by the federal government.

In 1947 and 1948, prior to Congress taking up the measure, Jefferson Parish continued to proclaim that the Jefferson Seaway was the superior option. In its public plea, Jefferson Parish cited significant cost savings because of flawed estimates for the Alexander Seaway project. Another factor noted was that the proposed Algiers Canal and locks were an inferior option to the Westwego locks and Jefferson Seaway. If constructed, the Jefferson Seaway would preclude the construction of the Algiers Canal and locks, further offsetting the overall costs of the seaway.

Jefferson also called attention to the Dock Board's control of ownership of all riverfront property in Orleans Parish and, by extension, along the full length of Inner Harbor Navigation Canal. Therefore, the New Orleans option effectively supported the Dock Board's position as a monopoly property owner. In Jefferson Parish, property along the Mississippi River was privately owned.

All considered, Jefferson was convinced that its seaway presented the better choice.

== Final authorization and end ==
In 1956, despite Jefferson's pleas, Congress arrived at a final selection and formally authorized the Alexander Seaway project, which assumed the name "Mississippi River-Gulf Outlet", in the River and Harbor Act bill approved on March 29, 1956 (Pub.L. 84–455), at an appropriated cost of US$88,000,000. Construction began in 1958 and was completed in 1968, allowing partial use by deep-draft vessels as early as 1963.

Though the federal government had obligated funding to the MR-GO, Jefferson continued to pursue its version of the seaway. In 1956, the Police Jury considered the sale of bonds that would locally finance the seaway project. 1958, the Jefferson Industrial Seaway Commission met with legal, fiscal and engineering experts in continuing its pursuit of its project, which at that point would have required the sale of local bonds to finance construction.

The promotion continued at least into the early 1960s, with continued support by Congressman Hale Boggs, who considered the Jefferson Seaway project to be a necessity even with the MR-GO becoming a reality.

Jefferson Parish touted the Jefferson Seaway project as late as 1961, envisioning an increase in demand for shipping spurred by the anticipated success of the Mississippi River Gulf Outlet. Moving forward, Jefferson Parish expected that its seaway would be driven and funded by private industry. However, construction of the Jefferson Seaway as a deep-draft channel never materialized, though the Barataria Bay Waterway continues its role as a federally authorized shallow-draft navigation channel.

After operating for 46 years, the MR-GO was eventually decommissioned and formally closed in July 2009.

== See also ==
- Mississippi River–Gulf Outlet Canal
- Panama Canal expansion project
