= Miraflores (Panama) =

One of the Panama Canal locks

Coordinates: 8°59′49.474″N 79°35′30.73″W

Miraflores is the name of one of the three locks that form part of the Panama Canal, and the name of the small lake that separates these locks from the Pedro Miguel Locks upstream. In the Miraflores locks, vessels are lifted (or lowered) 54 feet (16.5 m) in two stages, allowing them to transit to or from the Pacific Ocean port of Balboa in Panama City. Ships cross below the Bridge of the Americas, which connects North and South America.

As of 2005, the following schedule was in effect for ship transit through the locks: From 06:00 to 15:15, ships travel from the Pacific toward the Atlantic. From 15:45 to 23:00, ships travel from the Atlantic toward the Pacific. At any other time, travel is permitted in both directions.

A visitors center allows tourists to have a full view of the Miraflores locks operation. Binoculars are recommended to view the Pedro Miguel locks in the distance. As of 2024, admittance for adults to the visitors center costs US$17.22 (observation terrace and IMAX theater) with a lower rate for children. Panamanian residents are admitted at US$3 per person. Viewing a transit operation at the centre can take more than 30 minutes. A souvenir shop on the ground level sells related merchandise. The centre closes at 18:00.

== Gallery ==
The locks in operation

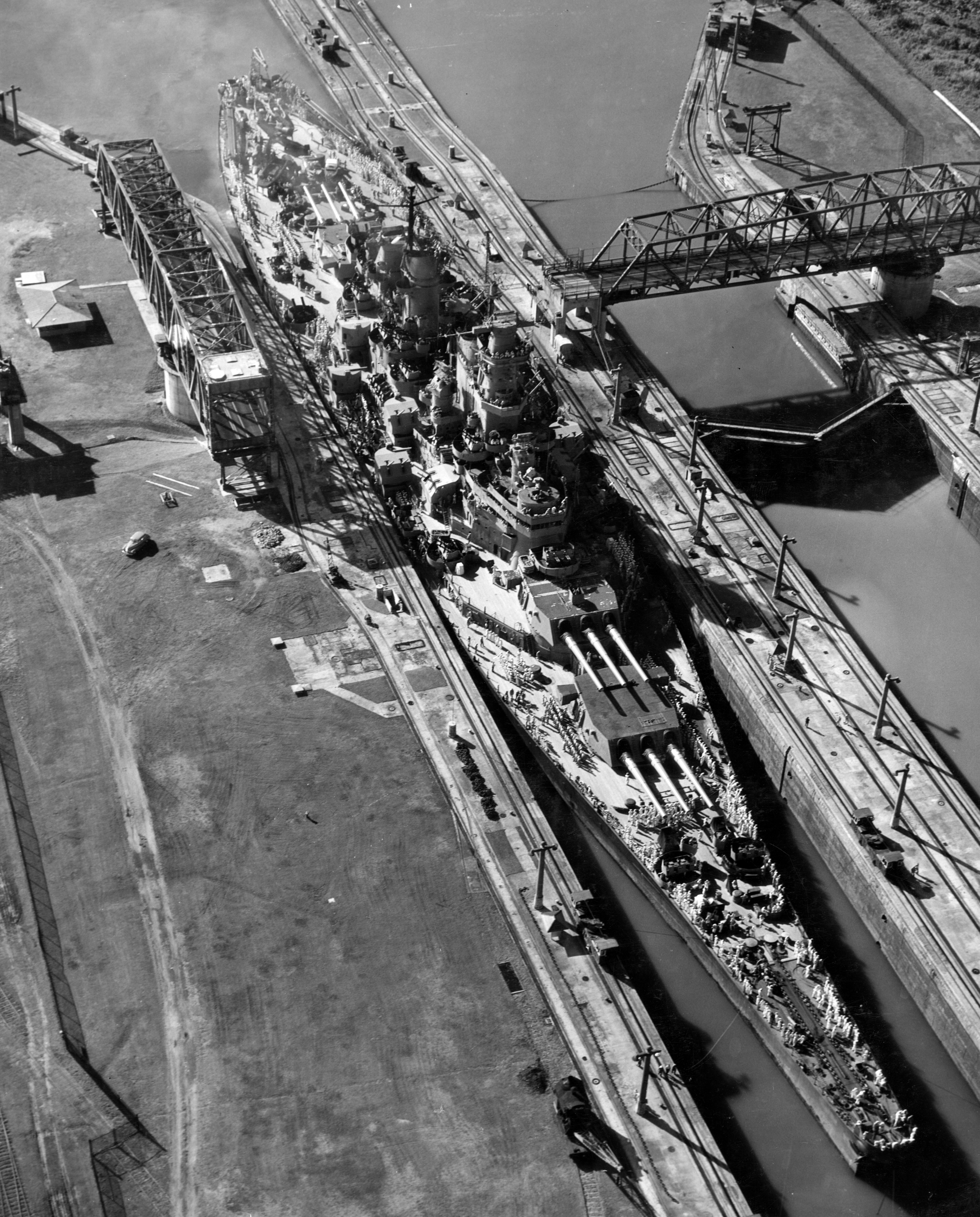
USS Missouri passing through the Miraflores locks in 1945

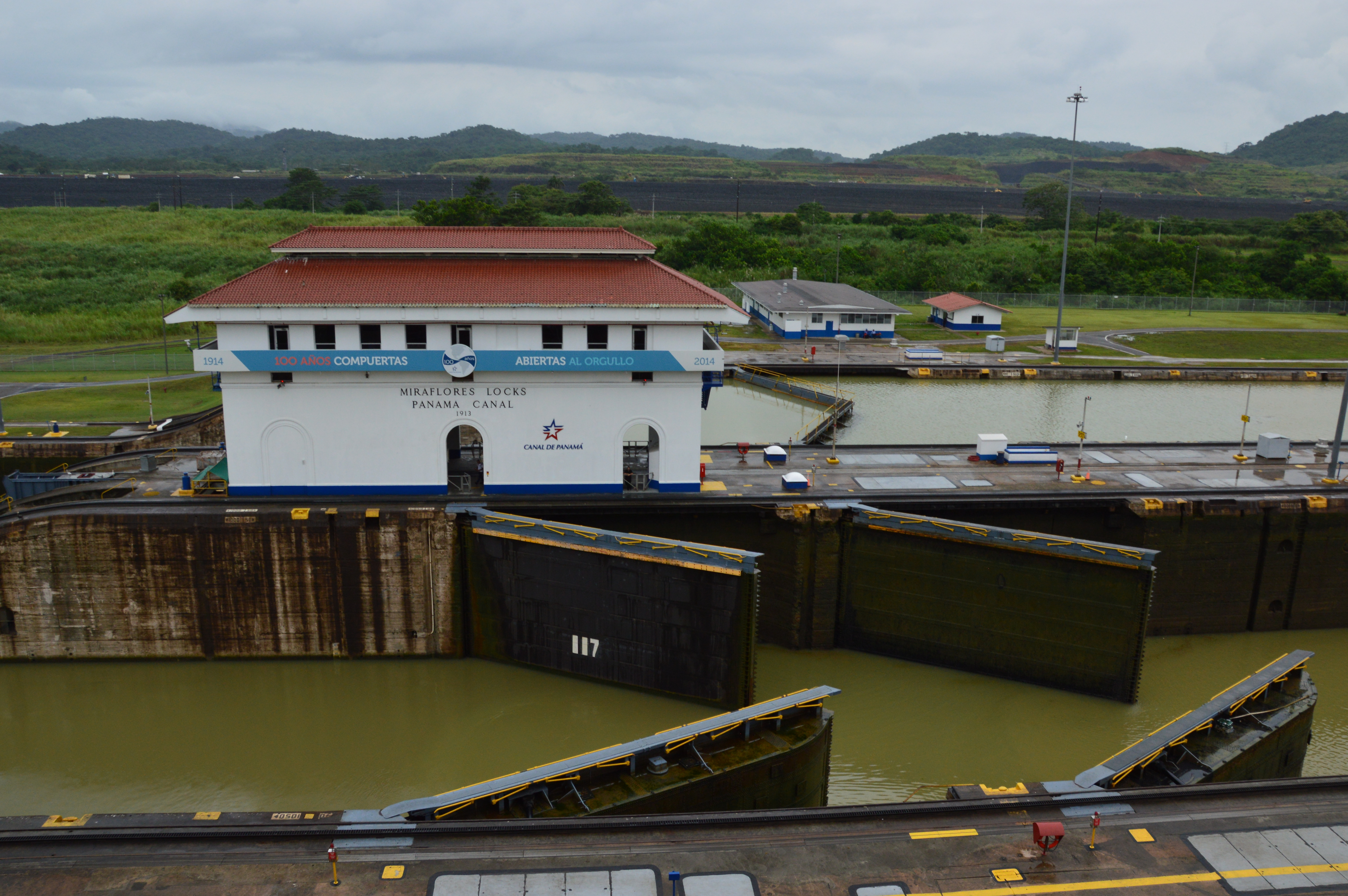
Main building of the Miraflores locks

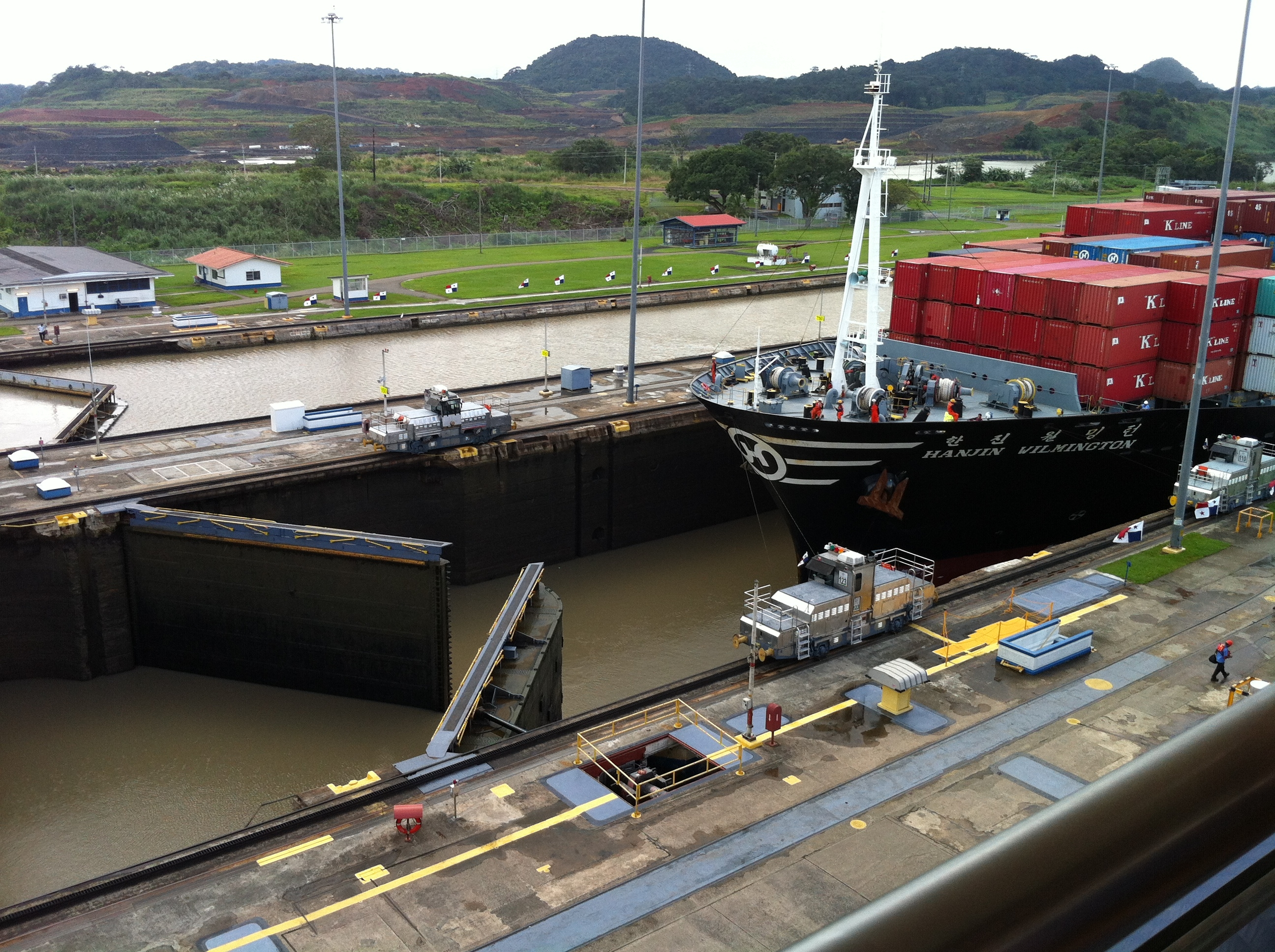
The Hanjin Wilmington in transit through the Miraflores locks toward the Pacific Ocean
