= Panama Canal expansion project =

2007–16 construction of larger locks on Panama Canal

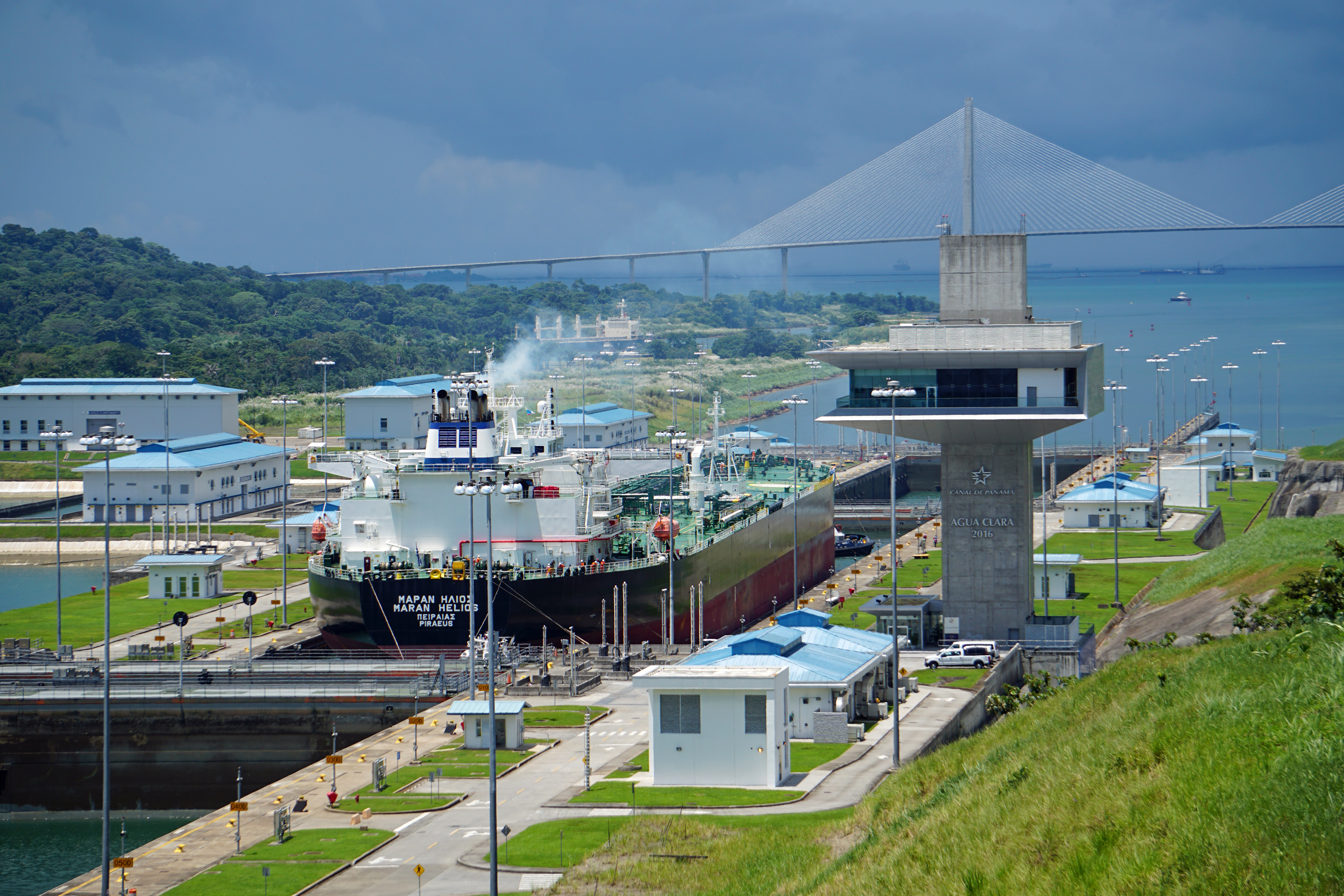
A New Panamax ship passes through the Panama Canal's Agua Clara lock in 2019. The Atlantic Bridge is seen in the background.

The Panama Canal expansion project (Spanish: ampliación del Canal de Panamá), also called the Third Set of Locks Project, doubled the capacity of the Panama Canal by adding a new traffic lane, enabling more ships to transit the waterway, and increasing the width and depth of the lanes and locks, allowing larger ships to pass. The new ships, called New Panamax, are about one and a half times larger than the previous Panamax size and can carry over twice as much cargo. The expanded canal began commercial operation on 26 June 2016.

The project has:

- Built two new sets of locks, one each on the Atlantic and Pacific sides, and excavated new channels to the new locks
- Widened and deepened existing channels
- Raised the maximum operating water level of Gatun Lake

Then-Panamanian President Martín Torrijos formally proposed the project on 24 April 2006, saying it would transform Panama into a First World country. A national referendum approved the proposal by a 76.8 percent majority on 22 October the same year, and the Cabinet and National Assembly followed suit. The project formally began in 2007.

It was initially announced that the canal expansion would be completed by August 2014 to coincide with the 100th anniversary of the opening of the Panama Canal, but various setbacks, including strikes and disputes with the construction consortium over cost overruns, pushed the completion date back several times. Following additional difficulties including seepage from the new locks, the expansion was opened on 26 June 2016. The expansion doubled the canal's capacity. On 2 March 2018, the Panama Canal Authority announced that 3,000 New Panamax ships had crossed the canal expansion during its first 20 months of operation.

== Background ==
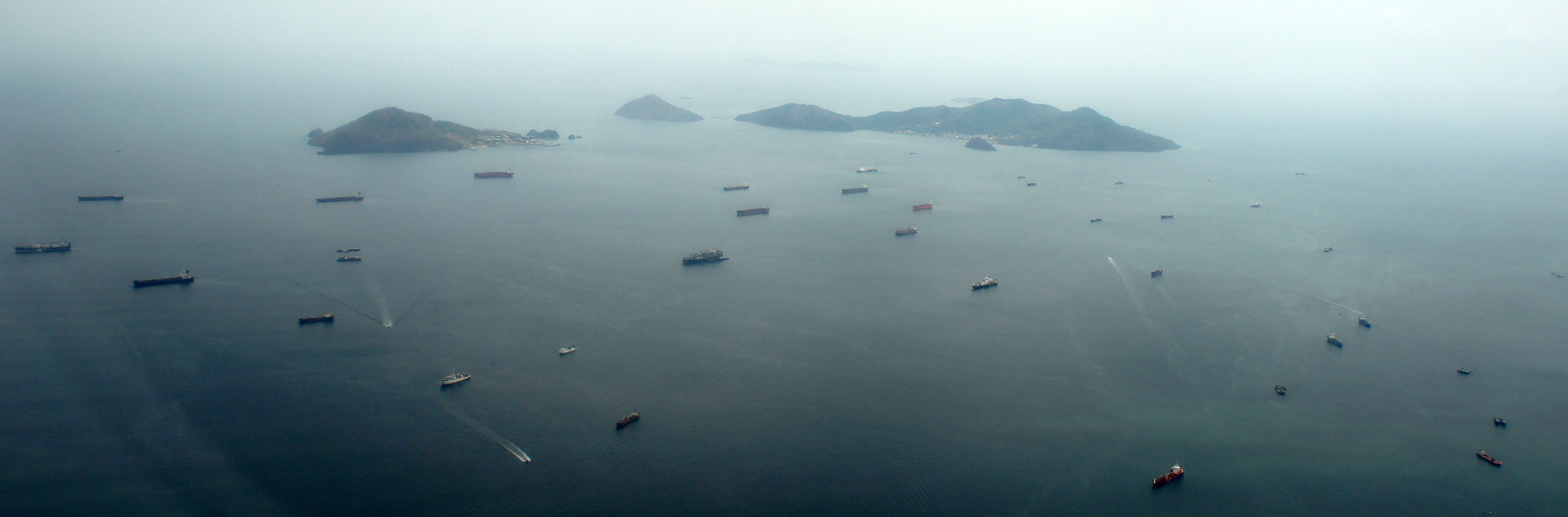
The Panama Canal has been working at full capacity for several years. Shown above are several dozen vessels queuing at the Pacific Ocean waiting to enter the canal in 2013.

The original Panama Canal had limited capacity determined by operational times and cycles of the existing locks and was further constrained by the current trend towards larger (close to Panamax-sized) vessels transiting the canal, requiring more transit time in the locks and channels. Also, periodic maintenance on the aging canal required shutdowns of the waterway. Demand was growing due to the growth of international trade, and many users required a guaranteed level of service. Despite the gains which have been made in efficiency, the Panama Canal Authority (ACP) estimated that the canal would reach its maximum sustainable capacity between 2009 and 2012. The long-term solution for the congestion was the expansion of the canal with a third set of locks.

The size of ships that could transit the canal, called Panamax, was constrained by the size of the locks, which are 34 m (110 ft) wide and 320 m (1,050 ft) long, and 12.6 m (41.2 ft) deep. The third set of locks allow transit of larger, Post-Panamax ships, which have a greater cargo capacity than the current locks can handle. The new lock chambers are 55 m (180 ft) wide, 430 m (1,400 ft) long, and 18 m (60 ft) deep. These dimensions allow for an estimated 79% of all cargo-carrying vessels to transit the canal, up from 45%.

All of the canal-widening studies since the 1930s determined that the best way to increase canal capacity was by building a third set of locks larger than the 1914 locks. The US began excavations for new locks in 1939, but abandoned them in 1942 because of the outbreak of World War II. This conclusion was again reached in the 1980s by the tripartite commission formed by Panama, Japan, and the US. More recently, the studies developed by the Panama Canal Authority (Spanish: Autoridad del Canal de Panamá (ACP)) for its 2025 master plan confirm that a third, larger set of locks is the most suitable, profitable, and environmentally responsible option.

President Martín Torrijos, in a 24 April 2006 speech announcing the project, said that the canal "is like our 'petroleum'. Just like the petroleum that has not been extracted is worthless and that in order to extract it you have to invest in infrastructure, the canal requires to expand its capacity to absorb the growing demand of cargo and generate more wealth for Panamanians".

While the canal expansion was being completed, and considering the high operational costs of the vessels, the long queues that occur during the high season December through March (sometimes up to a seven-day delay), and the high value of some of the cargo transported through the canal, the ACP implemented a Transit Booking System and Transit Slot Auction to allow a better management of the scarce capacity available and to increase the level of service offered to the shipping companies. The scheme gives users two choices: (1) transit by order of arrival on a first-come, first-served basis, as the canal historically has operated; or (2) booked service for a fee – a congestion charge. The booked service allows two options of fees. The Transit Booking System, available online, allowing customers who do not want to wait in queue to pay an additional 15% over the regular tolls, guaranteeing a specific day for transit and crossing the canal in 18 hours or less. ACP sells 24 of these daily slots up to 365 days in advance. Since 2006, ACP has made available a 25th slot, sold through the Transit Slot Auction to the highest bidder. The second choice is high priority transit. The main customers of the Transit Booking System are cruise ships, container ships, vehicle carriers, and non-containerized cargo vessels.

=== Cargo volume ===
The Panama Canal Authority predicts that the volume of cargo transiting the canal will grow by an average of 3% per year, doubling the 2005 tonnage by 2025. Allowing larger vessels to transit the canal will move more cargo per transit and volume of water used.

Historically, the dry and liquid bulk segments have generated most of the canal's revenues. Bulk cargo includes dry goods, such as grains (corn, soy, and wheat, among others), minerals, fertilizers, coal, and liquid goods, such as chemical products, propane gas, crude oil, and oil derivatives. Recently, containerized cargo has replaced dry bulk as the canal's main income generator, moving it to second place. Vehicle carriers have become the third-largest income generator, replacing the liquid bulk segment. Shipping industry analyses conducted by the ACP and top industry experts indicate that the canal expansion will be beneficial to both the canal and its users because of the demand that will be served by allowing the transit of more tonnage.

The growth in usage of the Panama Canal over the past few years has been almost entirely driven by increased US imports from China passing through the canal en route to ports on the US East and Gulf coasts. But it is increasingly recognized in both the US and China that this imbalance in trade is unsustainable and will be reduced via some sort of adjustment in the coming years (although such an imbalance need not be made up by physically shipped goods, but could be made by other trade such as intellectual property as China upgrades its intellectual property protection laws). The ACP, however, presumes that trade will continue to grow for a generation as it has for the past several years.

One of the central points made by critics of canal expansion, most prominently former canal administrator Fernando Manfredo, is that it is unrealistic to attempt to predict canal usage trends over a generation, improbable to expect that US imports from China will continue to grow for a generation as they have the past few years, and irresponsible to bet Panama's financial future on such a projection.

=== Competition ===
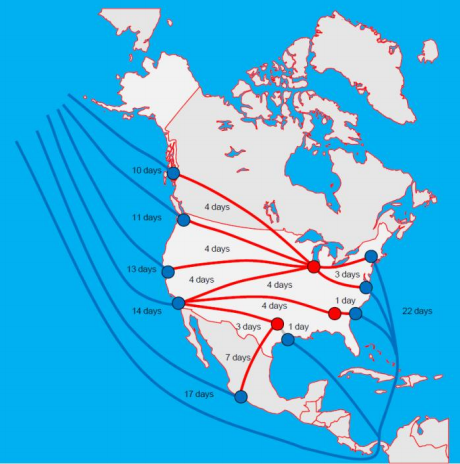
Container ship routes to North America from Asian Pacific

The most direct competition to the canal comes from alternative routes that present options for transporting cargo between the same points of origin and destination.

The opening of the Russian Northern Sea Route and the Canadian Northwest Passage to commercial traffic could pose an alternative to the canal in the long term. Warmer waters in the Arctic Ocean could open the passage for an increasing number of months each year, making it more attractive as a major shipping route. However, the passage through the Arctic would require significant investment in escort vessels and staging ports. The Canadian commercial marine transport industry does not anticipate that this route will be a viable alternative to the Panama Canal within the next 10 to 20 years.

The two main current competitors of the Panama Canal are the US intermodal system and the Suez Canal. The main ports and merchandise distribution centers in these routes are investing in capacity, location, and maritime and land infrastructure to serve post-Panamax container ships and their larger cargo volumes. According to the ACP, the growing usage of such ships in transcontinental routes competing with the canal is irreversible. It was estimated that by 2011 approximately 37% of the capacity of the world's container ship fleet would consist of vessels that did not fit through the canal, as it existed prior to 2016, and a great part of this fleet could be used on routes that compete with Panama.

The proposal states that strengthening the canal's competitive position will allow it to accommodate demand and serve its customers. If the canal had the capacity to serve the growing demand, Panama could become the most important connectivity hub on the continent by joining north–south continental routes and east–west transcontinental routes. Accordingly, the canal will continue to be viable and competitive in all of its routes and segments, and contribute significantly to Panama's development and growth while maintaining its position as a major world trade route.

=== Predictions ===
According to the studies conducted by the ACP in 2005, the canal would reach its maximum sustainable capacity between 2009 and 2012. When it reached this capacity it would not be able to continue to handle growth in demand, resulting in a reduction in the competitiveness of the Panama maritime route.

As approved by the Panamanian people, construction for the expansion project was slated to conclude by April 2016. The ACP said it would use all possible means to stretch capacity until the construction was completed.

The proposed expansion of the canal by the construction of a third set of locks would allow it to capture the entire demand projected through 2025 and beyond. Together, the existing and new locks approximately double the capacity of the canal.

Critics such as former legislator Keith Holder, co-author of the legislation that created the ACP, pointed out that canal usage is seasonal and that even during the few months when it is most crowded, the bottleneck that slows traffic is not the locks but the narrow Culebra Cut, which has a limited capacity for large ships to pass one another.

Although the canal was nearing its maximum capacity, it did not mean that ships were unable to transit it. Rather, the canal's growth capacity stagnated and that it could not capture additional cargo volumes.

The former head of the Panama Canal's dredging division, Thomas Drohan, a critic of the expansion plan, discounted allegations that this is a problem in the short term. He argued that if the supply of any good or service becomes short, businesses can raise their prices; this would apply to Panama Canal tolls as much as it does to petroleum.

== The project ==
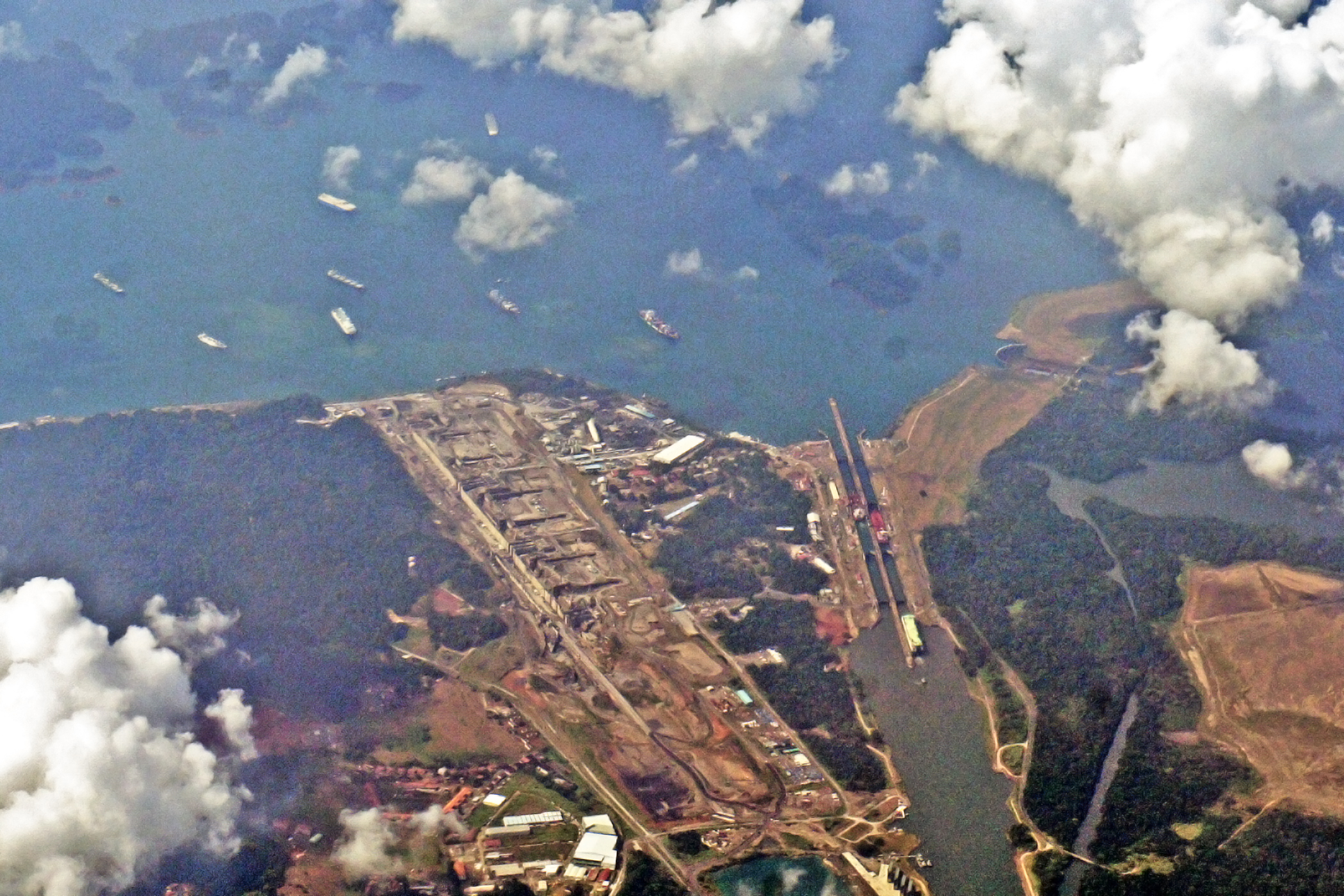
Aerial view of Gatun Locks. At top, several vessels in Gatun Lake wait to cross the locks. At bottom, is the exit canal to the Atlantic Ocean. At left of the existing locks is the construction area for the new locks and water-saving chambers.

=== Locks ===
The original canal has two lanes, each with its own set of locks. The expansion project added a third lane through the construction of lock complexes at each end of the canal. One lock complex is located on the Pacific side, southwest of the existing Miraflores Locks. The other is located east of the existing Gatun Locks. Each of these new lock complexes have three consecutive chambers designed to move vessels from sea level to the level of Gatun Lake and back down again.

Each chamber has three lateral water-saving basins, for a total of nine basins per lock and 18 basins in total. Just like the original locks, the new locks and their basins are filled and emptied by gravity, without the use of pumps. The location of the new locks uses part of the area excavated by the United States in 1939 and suspended in 1942 because of World War II. The new locks are connected to the existing channel system through new navigational channels. The new lock chambers are 427 m (1,401 ft) long, 55 m (180 ft) wide, and 18.3 m (60 ft) deep. They use rolling gates instead of miter gates, which are used by the original locks. Rolling gates are used in almost all existing locks with dimensions similar to the new ones, and are a proven technology. The new locks use tugboats to position the vessels instead of electric locomotives. As with rolling gates, tugs are successfully and widely used for these purposes in locks of similar dimensions.

=== Water-saving basins ===
Diagram of water-saving basins (descending)

Diagram of water-saving basins (ascending)

The new locks have water-saving basins to reduce the volume of water that is needed in lock operation. The operation of both the old and new locks uses gravity and valves. There is no pumping involved.

Operation of the locks, old and new, uses water from Gatun Lake. Even in the original situation with two lock lanes, water supply can be limited at the end of Panama's dry season, when the lake's water level is low. The addition of a third set of locks meant that this water supply issue needed to be addressed.

For the new locks, three basins are associated with each lock chamber. The volume lost per cycle is two-fifths of the "moving water" chamber volume. The other three-fifths is reused. An equal savings of water, based on the same principle, could be reached by adding more lock chambers. Constructing a stair of eight chambers (instead of three) to elevate 26 m (85 ft) would use an 3.25 m (11 ft) water slice per cycle. However, this would require ships to travel through eight locks, making ship handling less efficient.

Water usage is calculated per single lock cycle. It is determined by the water volume in a lock chamber between the levels it handles. Essentially, each cycle uses the volume of water discharged by the lock chamber (its width multiplied by its height and depth). When the locks are in stairs, as in the Panama Canal, only the first (highest) lock chamber matters for this calculation. None of the lower locks use additional water; they have the same volume. The ship's underwater volume does not matter, because that volume is present both before and after the change in water level and thus is part of the non-moved volume.

The water used per lock operating cycle is therefore equal to the amount of water that flows into the first (upper) lock chamber when filling it from Gatun Lake. Reducing this volume requires reducing the chamber's width, length, or elevating height. Note that the elevating height has already been reduced by staging the total 85 ft (26 m) elevation change into three locks. Were this change done in a single lock chamber, the water volume lost would be three times as much.

The water-saving basins function as follows: The volume of water moved by the lock chamber (e.g., a height of 30 ft (9 m)) can be divided into five equal horizontal "slices" (here, 1.8 m each). When the canal begins operation, the chamber is filled once from Gatun Lake. Then, when emptying the chamber, the top three slices (1, 2, and 3) are emptied, one by one, into three basins, each at a successively lower elevation. That is, water slice 1 is emptied from the chamber, using gravity and valves, into a basin that is at the same level as water slice 2. Then water slice 2 is emptied into a basin at the same level as water slice 3, and slice 3 is emptied into a basin at the same level as slice 4. Water slices 4 and 5 are emptied into the next lock chamber and "lost" (as in the original canal locks).

When the lock moves a ship upward, the chamber is closed, and the water from the basin at level 4 is first let into the chamber, filling slice 5. Then basin level 3 fills chamber level 4, and basin level 2 fills chamber level 3. Next, chamber levels 2 and 1 are filled from Gatun Lake, "costing" a volume of 3.6 m (12 ft) instead of 9 m (30 ft) over the chamber area (2/5 of the elevation height). The ship is now at the level of Gatun Lake and can cross it.

=== Navigational channels ===
According to the plan, a 3.2 km (2.0 mi)-long access channel was excavated to connect the new Atlantic locks with the existing sea entrance of the canal. To connect the new Pacific-side locks with the existing channels, two new access channels were built:

- The 6.2 km (3.9 mi) north access channel, which connects the new Pacific-side lock with the Culebra Cut, circumventing Miraflores Lake. This channel runs along the new Borinquen Dam that separates it from Miraflores Lake (which has a water level that is 9 m lower, due to the dislocation of the Pedro Miguel locks).
- The 1.8 km (1.1 mi) south access channel, which connects the new lock with the existing sea entrance on the Pacific Ocean

The new channels on both the Atlantic and the Pacific sides are at least 218 meters (715 feet) wide, permitting Post-Panamax vessels to navigate in a single direction.

=== Maximum operating level of Gatun Lake ===
Canal elevations are referred to using the Precise Level Datum (PLD), which is close to the mean sea level of the Atlantic and Pacific entrances. The maximum operational level of Gatun Lake was raised by approximately 0.45 meters (1.5 feet) from the previous PLD level of 26.7 meters (88 feet) to a PLD level of 27.1 meters (89 feet). Combined with the widening and deepening of the navigational channels, this has increased Gatun Lake's usable water reserve capacity and allows the canal's water system to supply a daily average of 625,000 m^{3} (165 million US gal) of additional water. This additional water volume is enough to provide an annual average of approximately 1,100 additional lockages without affecting the water supply for human use, which is also provided from Gatun and Alhajuela Lakes.

== Construction timeline ==
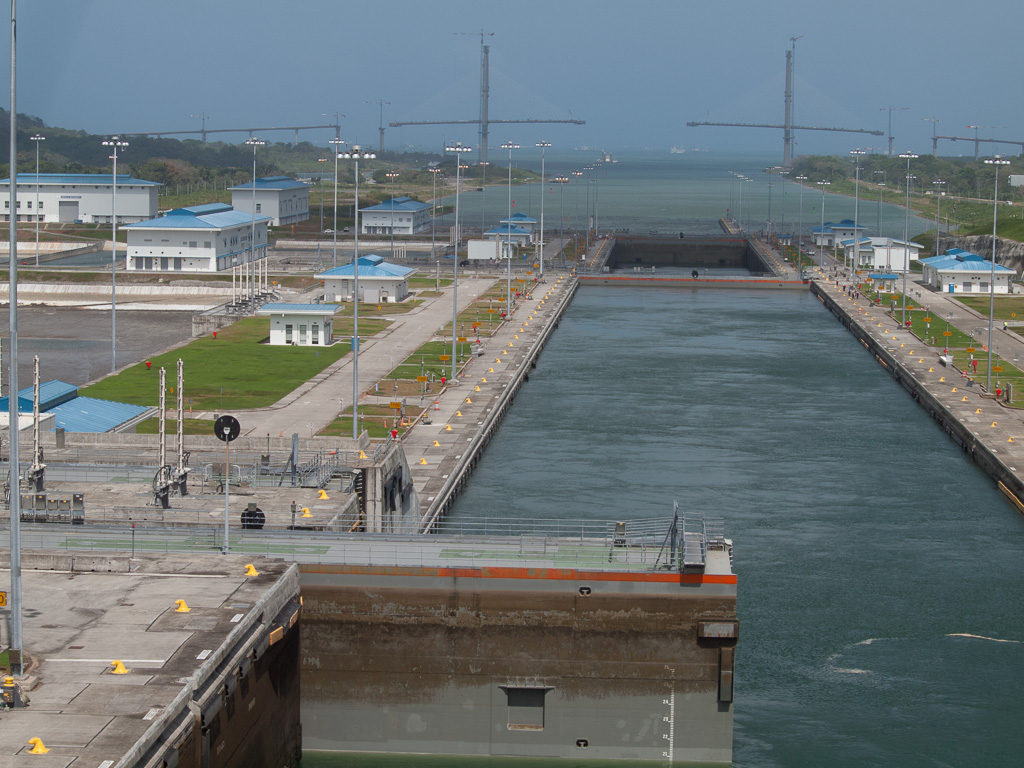
New Agua Clara Locks, with rolling gate is shown partially open. Atlantic Bridge, under construction, is in background.

The construction of the third set of locks project was originally slated to take seven or eight years, with the new locks beginning operations between fiscal years 2014 and 2015, roughly 100 years after the canal first opened. In July 2012, however, it was announced that the expansion project had fallen six months behind schedule, pushing the opening date back from October 2014 to April 2015. By September 2014, the new gates were projected to be open for transit at the "beginning of 2016."

In October 2011, the Panama Canal Authority announced the completion of the third phase of excavation for the Pacific access channel.

In June 2012, a 30-metre (100 ft) tall reinforced concrete monolith was completed, the first of 46 such monoliths that line the new Pacific-side lock walls.

Sixteen new lock gates were installed as part of the canal expansion: eight on the Atlantic side, and eight on the Pacific. The installation process began in December 2014, with a 3,285-ton gate's installation on the Atlantic side; it concluded in April 2015, with the installation of a 4,232-ton gate on the Pacific side.

In June 2015, flooding of the new locks began: first on the Atlantic side, then on the Pacific; by then, the canal's re-inauguration was slated for April 2016.

In August 2015, a crack was reported in a concrete sill at the new Cocolí locks, but it was not initially anticipated to affect the project completion timeline. By November 2015, however, cracks discovered over the previous months threatened to delay project completion. Sill reinforcements were, however, anticipated to be completed by January 2016. In early February 2016, the ACP reported that sill reinforcements, repairing the cracks detected earlier, were complete.

By January 2016, Panama's President Varela indicated that he anticipated the expansion to be complete around May 2016.

The expanded canal began commercial operation on 26 June 2016. The first ship to cross the canal using the third set of locks was a modern New Panamax vessel, the Chinese-owned container ship "Cosco Shipping Panama." The United States dispatched a navy ship to Panama to demonstrate U.S. naval power to the Chinese ship.

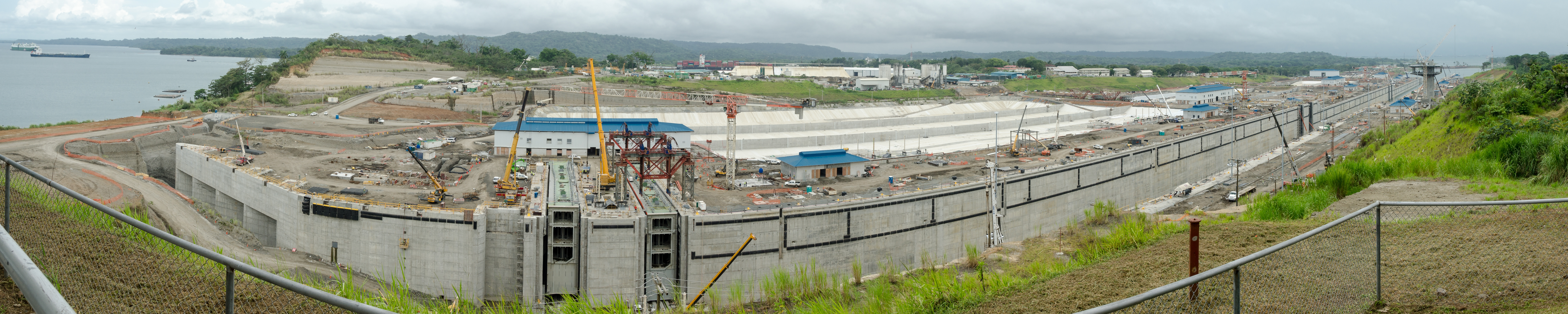
Panoramic view of the construction works of the Panama Canal expansion project in July 2015

== Finances ==
The main purpose of the canal expansion program is to increase Panama's ability to benefit from the growing traffic demand. This growing demand is manifested in both the increased cargo volumes and the size of vessels that will use the Panama route. In this sense, with a third set of locks, the canal will be able to manage the traffic demand forecast beyond 2025; total inflation-adjusted revenues for that year are predicted to amount to over US$6.2 billion.

=== Estimated cost ===
In 2006, ACP estimated the cost of the third set of locks project at US$5.25 billion. This figure includes design, administration, construction, testing, environmental mitigation, and commissioning costs, as well as contingencies to cover risks and unforeseen events, such as accidents, design changes, price increases, and possible delays. The cost of interest paid on loans during construction is not included. The largest cost is that associated with constructing the two new lock complexes – one each on the Atlantic and Pacific sides – with estimated costs of US$1.11 billion and US$1.03 billion each, plus a US$590 million provision for contingencies during their construction.

Opponents contend the project is based on uncertain projections about maritime trade and the world economy. Roberto N. Méndez, an economist at the University of Panama, alleges that the economic and financial projections are based on manipulated data. Independent engineers, most notably Humberto Reynolds and Tomás Drohan Ruiz, the former head of engineering and dredging of the Panama Canal, said that the project would cost much more than budgeted and that it was too risky for Panama. M. A. Bernal, a professor at the University of Panama, argued that confidence in the ACP's budget is undermined because of the involvement of engineering and consultancy firm Parsons Brinckerhoff.

=== Estimated profitability and financing ===
According to the ACP, the third set of locks would be financially profitable, producing a 12 percent internal rate of return. The project's financing is separate from the governmental budget. The state, which has a lower credit rating than the ACP, does not guarantee or endorse any loans borrowed by the ACP for the project. Assuming that tolls increase at an annual average rate of 3.5 percent for 20 years, and according to the traffic demand forecast and construction schedule deemed most likely by the ACP, the external financing required would be temporary and in the order of US$2.3 billion to cover peak construction activities between 2009 and 2011.

The ACP's revenue projections are based on questionable assumptions about increased canal usage and shippers' willingness to pay higher tolls instead of seeking competing routes. In a bid to attract new business as well as keeping the current customers, the ACP is looking to implement financial incentives in their toll programme, including a loyalty scheme, which are expected to combat the problems raised by increased fees. With the cash flow generated by the expanded canal, investment costs are expected to be recovered in less than 10 years, and financing could be repaid in approximately eight.

The $2.3 billion financing package for the canal expansion, signed in December 2008 during the 2008 financial crisis, included loans from the following government-owned financial institutions:

- Japan Bank for International Cooperation (JBIC) – US$800 million
- European Investment Bank (EIB) – US$500 million
- Inter-American Development Bank (IDB) – US$400 million
- CAF – Development Bank of Latin America and the Caribbean (CAF) – US$300 million
- International Finance Corporation (IFC) – US$300 million

The financing is not tied; that is, contracts can be awarded to firms from any country. The loans are for 20 years, including a 10-year grace period. Under a common terms agreement, all five financial institutions agreed to provide the same loan conditions to the ACP. Shortly before, credit rating agency Moody's gave the ACP an A1 investment grade rating. Mizuho Corporate Bank and the law firm Shearman & Sterling helped develop the financing package.

== Environmental impact ==
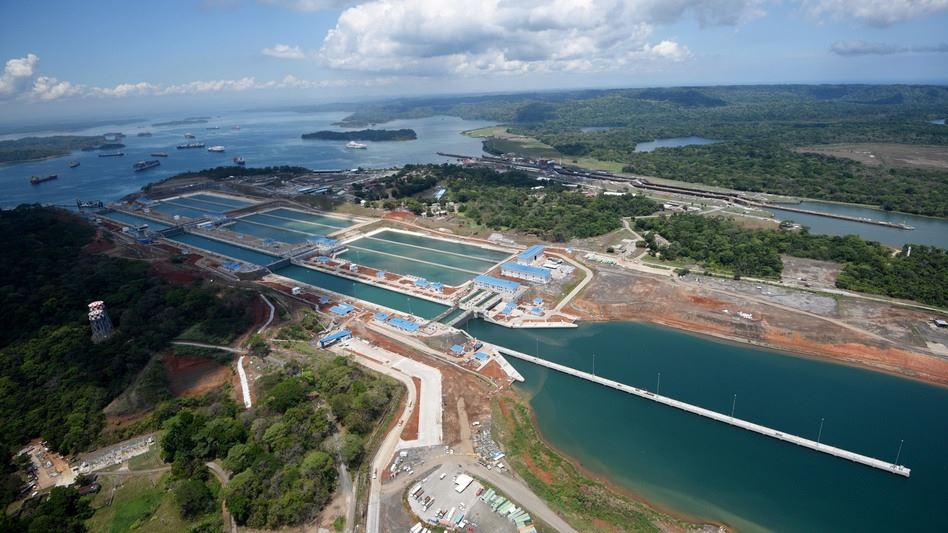
New Panama Canal Agua Clara locks (Atlantic side). The three sets of water-saving basins are shown on top of the canal locks, 2017.

The ACP's proposal claims that the project will not permanently harm the environment, communities, primary forests, national parks or forest reserves, relevant patrimonial or archaeological sites, agricultural or industrial production areas, or tourist or port areas. It says that any harm can be mitigated using existing procedures and technology.

The proposal says that the project will not permanently reduce water or air quality. The proposed water supply program maximizes the water capacity of Gatun and Alhajuela Lakes and is designed to use water efficiently so that no new reservoirs will be required and no communities need to be displaced.

Critics of the project contend that there are many environmental issues to be considered, such as the link between El Niño (ENSO) and the threat to water supplies posed by El Niño. The ACP has commissioned studies by several consultants about water supply and quality problems. Some of the most prominent critics of the canal expansion plan from the point of view of water quality issues are Eric Jackson (editor of the online Panama News), Gonzalo Menendez (former head of Panama's National Environmental Authority), and Ariel Rodriguez (a biologist at the University of Panama), and former Vice Minister of Public Works Grettel Villalaz de Allen.

Jackson contends that the ACP's public statements often do not match the findings of their studies. He argues that studies by Delft Hydraulics, WPSI Inc., and DHI say that the proposed water-saving basins will allow more salt water into Gatun Lake, from which about half of Panama's population takes its drinking water. The ACP says that the problem can be reduced by flushing the new locks with fresh water from Gatun Lake, but this would defeat the water-saving feature.

However, one of the leading environmental organizations in Panama, the National Association for Nature Conservation (ANCON), says that the studies and projections of operations of the third set of locks, including the water-saving basins, credibly state that there will be very low levels of salinization of waters of Gatun Lake and that these levels will preserve the biological separation of the oceans while safekeeping biodiversity and water quality for human use.

== Employment generation ==
According to the ACP, the canal expansion's impact on employment was first to be observed in jobs directly generated by its construction. Approximately 35,000–40,000 new jobs were created during the construction of the third set of locks, including 6,500–7,000 additional jobs that were directly related to the project during the peak years of construction. However, officials state that the most important impacts on employment will be medium and long term, and will come from the economic growth brought about by extra income generated by the expanded canal and the economic activities produced by the increase in canal cargo and vessel transits.

The labor required for construction of the third set of locks was largely done by Panamanians. To ensure the availability of Panamanian labor necessary for the third set of locks project and its connected activities, the ACP and public and private authorities worked jointly to train the required workforce, with sufficient lead time, so that it had the necessary competencies, capabilities, and certifications. The costs of these training programs were included in the cost estimates of the project.

Critics dismiss this as demagogy, noting that according to the ACP's own studies, at the peak of construction there would be fewer than 6,000 jobs created, and that some of these would be highly skilled posts filled by foreigners because there are no Panamanians qualified to fill them.

Among those who opposed the canal expansion proposal is Panama's construction workers' union, SUNTRACS. The workers went on strike demanding higher pay, back pay, and better safety. The average worker was getting paid $2.90/hr and a skilled worker was paid $3.52/hr. After the strike average worker was getting paid about $4.90/hr and skilled about $7.10/hr. The union's secretary general, Genaro Lopez, argued that while some construction jobs would be created by the project, the debt that Panama incurs to build a third set of locks will not be defrayed by increased canal usage and thus an increased part of canal revenues will go toward paying the debt, reducing the waterway's contributions to the national government's general fund, in turn reducing the money available for road projects, public schools, police protection, and other government services.

Critics also claim that the project lacks an accompanying social development plan. Then-President Torrijos has since accepted the request to develop one with the mediation of the United Nations Development Programme.

== In support of the project ==
ANCON (the National Association for Nature Conservation) approved the environmental studies of the proposal and gave some recommendations before the project was approved. The following had also endorsed the proposal:

- La Prensa newspaper, in an editorial note
- Chamber of Commerce, Industries and Agriculture
- The government-aligned CONATO (National Council of Organized Workers)
- Stanley Heckadon Moreno, former director of the INRENARE agency, predecessor of the National Environmental Authority
- Former Miss Universe Justine Pasek, writer Rosa María Britton, and painter Olga Sinclair
- Canal customers, many in the maritime industries and the business community
- 77% of Panamanian voters, in a referendum; the turnout was 43%

== Against the project ==
Former President Jorge Illueca, former sub-administrator of the Panama Canal Commission Fernando Manfredo, shipping consultant Julio Manduley, and industrial entrepreneur George Richa M. said that the expansion was not necessary; they claimed that the construction of a mega-port on the Pacific side would be sufficient to meet probable future demand. Such a port would be the second in the American Pacific deep enough to handle post-Panamax ships, the first being Los Angeles. As Panama is already a natural trading route, it would be able to handle the movement of containers from the Pacific to the Atlantic side via railroad, where containers would be reloaded to other ships for worldwide distribution. In addition, the following organizations and people opposed the project:

- The Council on Hemispheric Affairs (COHA) stated in a press release that under the Torrijos government, the expanding Panama Canal would not likely serve the needs of the vast majority of Panamanians. Many of the benefits would be tied to the commercial interests of the country's accountants, bankers, and lawyers, as well as their US counterparts, and world trade. They also said that the administration's rampant corruption and other flaws raised questions about Panama's capacity to supervise such an enormous project. COHA has received some letters pointing out factual errors in its statement, and plans to modify its statement in response.
- Former President Guillermo Endara and his Vanguardia Moral de la Patria Party, Molirena, a conservative, business-oriented party that normally gets about 10 percent of the vote.
- Most of the Panamanian left and most of the labor movement, including CONUSI (National Independent Syndicate Union) and Frenadeso (the National Front for the Defence of Social and Economic Rights).
- Most members of the nationalist Panameñista Party (Grettel Villalaz de Allen and Gonzalo Menendez, mentioned above, and former legislator Gloria Young are prominent examples).

== See also ==
- Bayonne Bridge, an American bridge raised to accommodate post-Panamax ships
- Nicaragua Canal
- Tehuantepec Route
- Megaproject
- Panama Canal Railway
