= Panama Canal locks =

Devices to raise and lower ships as they pass between oceans

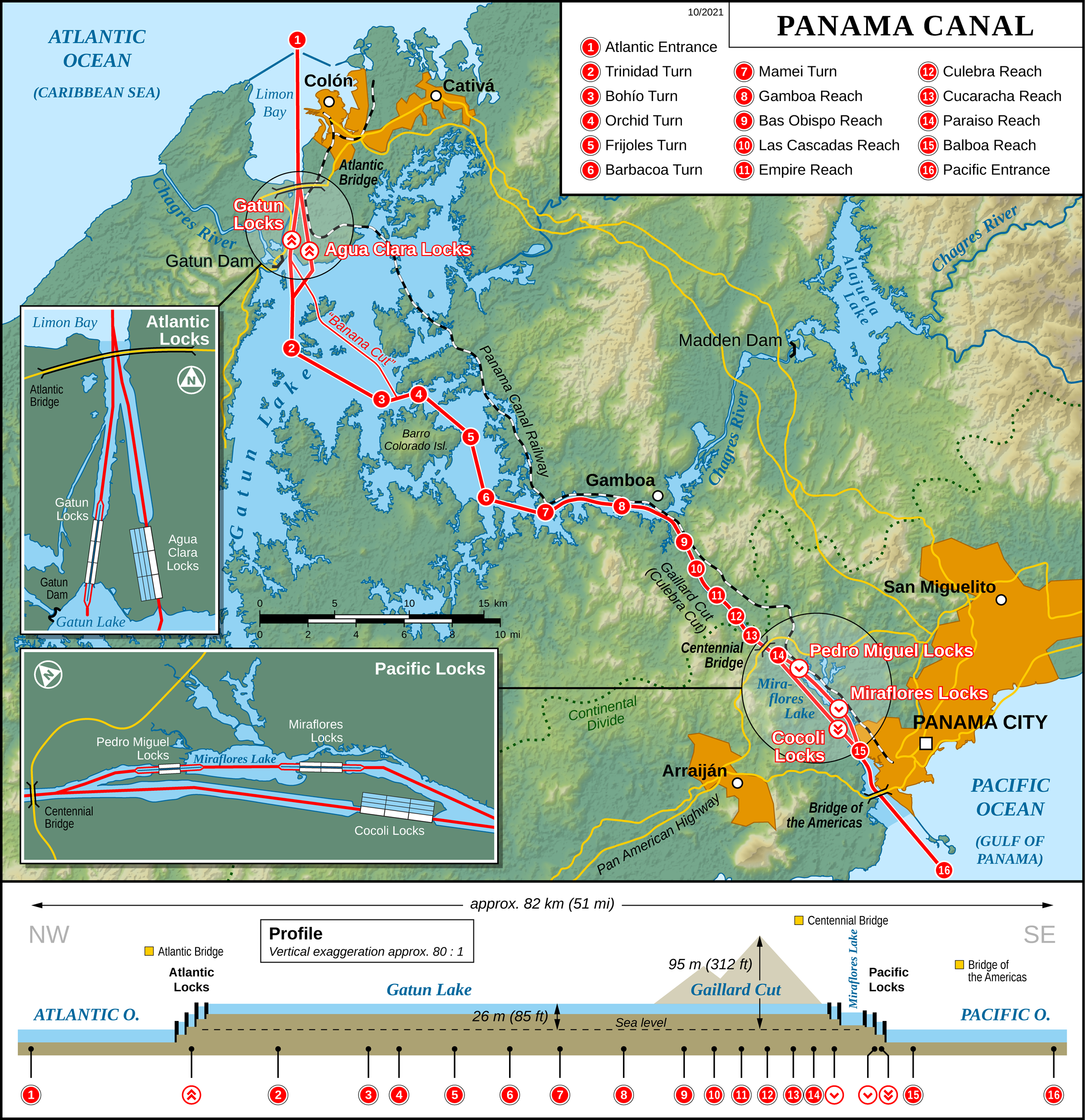
Sequence of locks and passages that a vessel passes through while transiting the Panama Canal

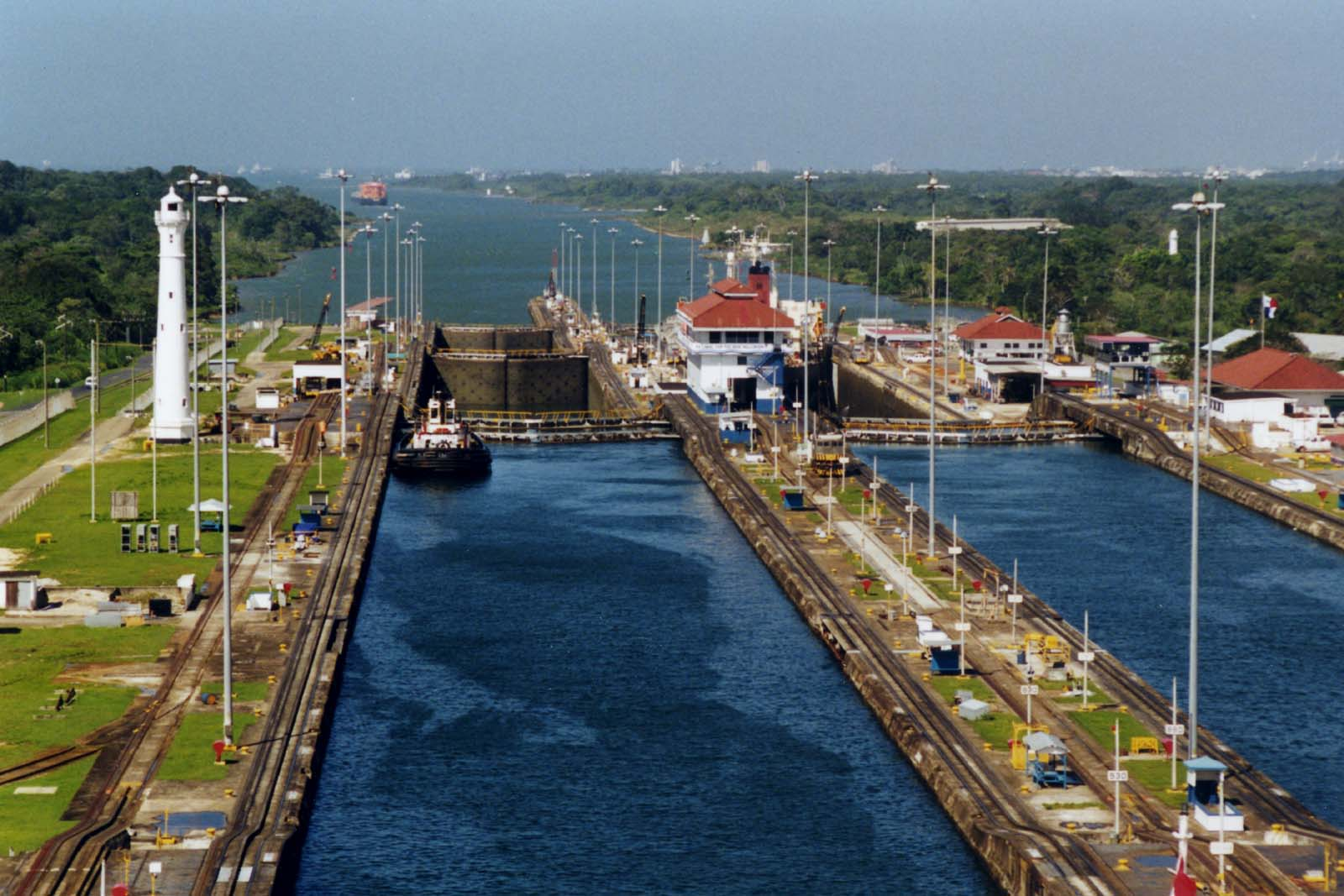
The Gatun Locks, looking north towards the Atlantic Ocean

The Panama Canal locks (Spanish: Esclusas del Canal de Panamá) are a lock system that lifts ships up 85 feet (26 metres) to the main elevation of the Panama Canal and lowers them down again. The original canal had a total of six steps (three up, three down) for a ship's passage. The total length of the lock structures, including the approach walls, is over 1.9 miles (3 km). The locks were one of the greatest engineering works ever to be undertaken when they opened in 1914. No other concrete construction of comparable size was undertaken until the Hoover Dam, in the 1930s.

There are two independent transit lanes, since each lock is built double. The size of the original locks limits the maximum size of ships that can transit the canal; this size is known as Panamax. Construction on the Panama Canal expansion project, which included a third set of locks, began in September 2007, finished by May 2016 and began commercial operation on June 26, 2016. The new locks allow transit of larger, New Panamax ships, which have a greater cargo capacity than the previous locks were capable of handling.

== Design ==
There are twelve locks (six pairs) in total. A two-step flight at Miraflores and a single pair at Pedro Miguel lift ships from the Pacific up to Gatun Lake; then a triple flight at Gatun lowers them to the Atlantic side. All three sets of locks are paired; that is, there are two parallel flights of locks at each of the three lock sites. This, in principle, allows ships to pass in opposite directions simultaneously; however, large ships cannot cross safely at speed in the Culebra Cut, so in practice ships pass in one direction for a time, then in the other, using both "lanes" of the locks in one direction at a time. In this usage pattern, the paired locks offer redundancy during maintenance or in the event of mechanical issues.

24-hour time-lapse of the upper chamber of the Miraflores Locks

The lock chambers are 110 ft (33.53 m) wide by 1,050 ft (320 m) long, with a usable length of 1,000 ft (305 m). These dimensions determine the maximum size of ships that can use the canal; this size is known as Panamax. The total lift (the amount by which a ship is raised or lowered) in the three steps of the Gatun locks is 85 ft (25.9 m); the lift of the two-step Miraflores locks is 54 ft (16 m). The single-step Pedro Miguel locks have a lift of 31 ft (9.4 m). The lift at Miraflores actually varies due to the extreme tides on the Pacific side, between 43 ft (13 m) at extreme high tide and 64.5 ft (20 m) at extreme low tide; tidal differences on the Atlantic side are very small.

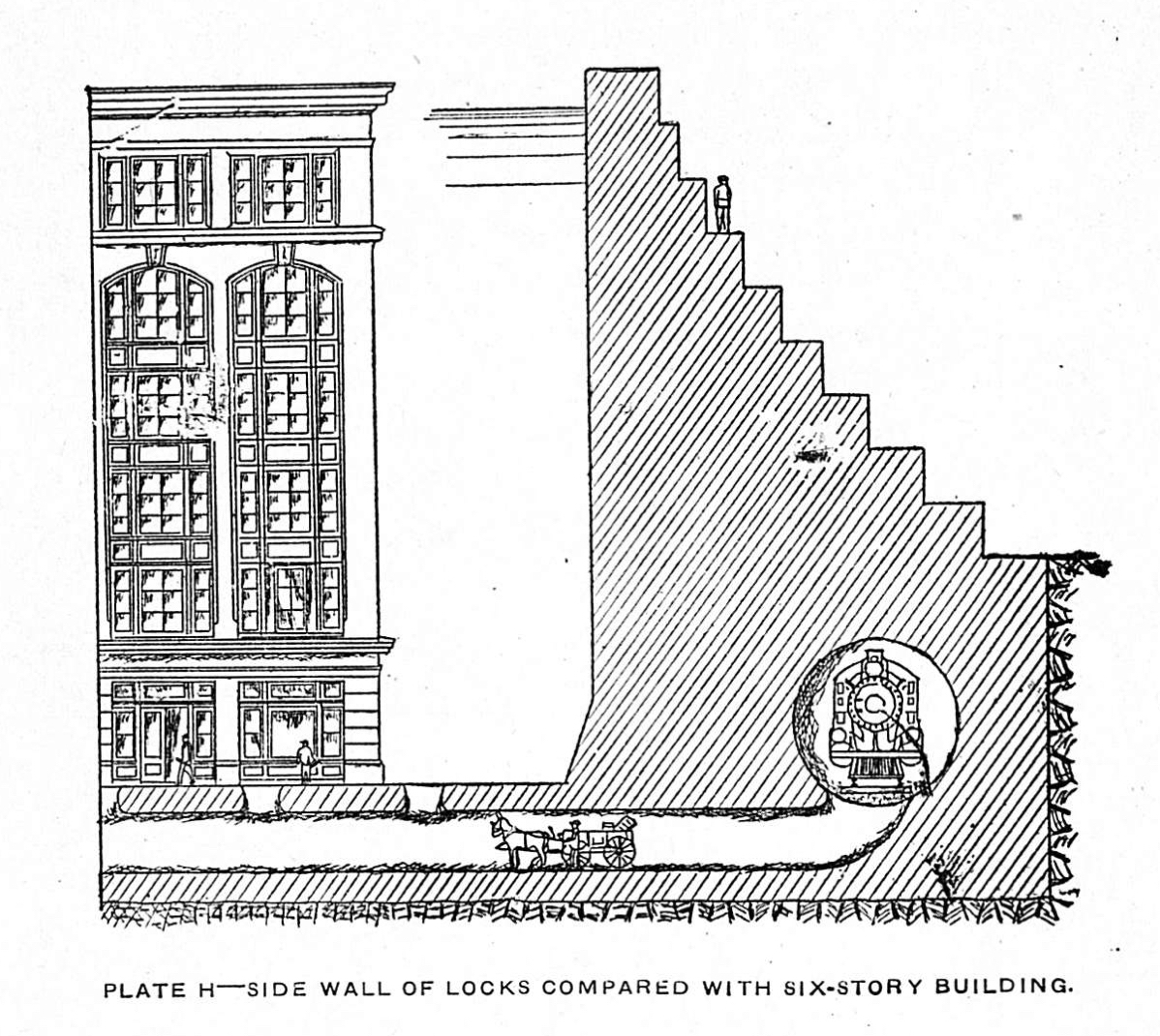
Side wall of locks compared with six-story building

The lock chambers are massive concrete structures. The side walls are from 45 to 55 ft (14 to 17 m) thick at the bases; toward the top, where less strength is required, they taper down in steps to 8 ft (2.4 m). The center wall between the chambers is 60 ft (18 m) thick and houses three galleries that run its full length. The lowest of these is a drainage tunnel; above this is a gallery for electrical cabling; and toward the top is a passageway that allows operators to gain access to the lock machinery.

== Filling and draining ==
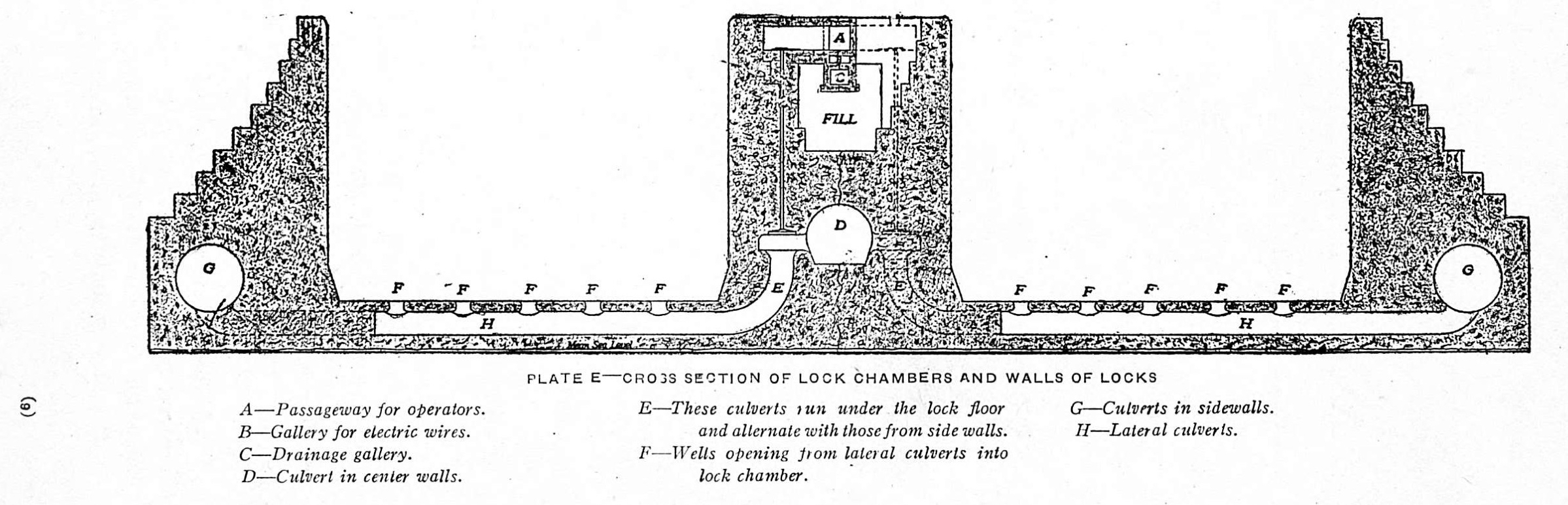
Cross section of lock chambers

Each lock chamber requires 26,700,000 US gal (101,000 m^{3}) of water to fill it from the lowered to the raised position; the same amount of water must be drained from the chamber to lower it again. Embedded in the side and center walls are three large water culverts that are used to carry water from the lake into the chambers to raise them, and from each chamber down to the next, or to the sea, to lower them. These culverts start at a diameter of 22 ft (6.71 m) and reduce to 18 ft (5.49 m) in diameter, large enough to accommodate a train. Cross culverts branch off from these main culverts, running under the lock chambers to openings in the floors. There are fourteen cross culverts in each chamber, each with five openings; seven cross culverts from the sidewall main culverts alternate with seven from the center wall culvert.

The water is moved by gravity and is controlled by huge valves in the culverts. Each cross culvert is independently controlled. A lock chamber can be filled in as little as ten minutes.

== Gates ==
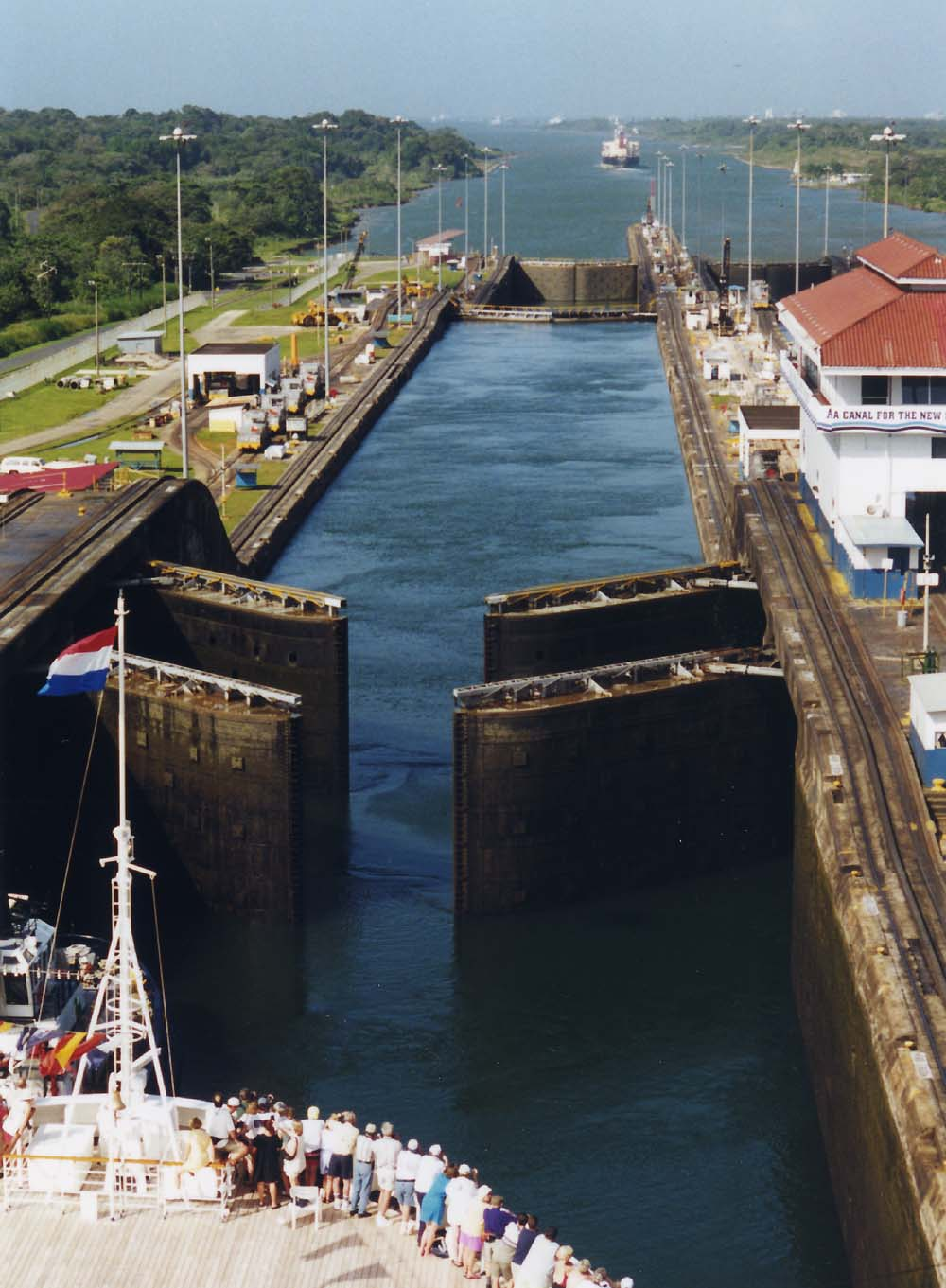
Gates of the Gatun locks open for a cruise ship making its way down to the Caribbean end of the canal. The gates at both ends of the upper chamber are doubled for safety.

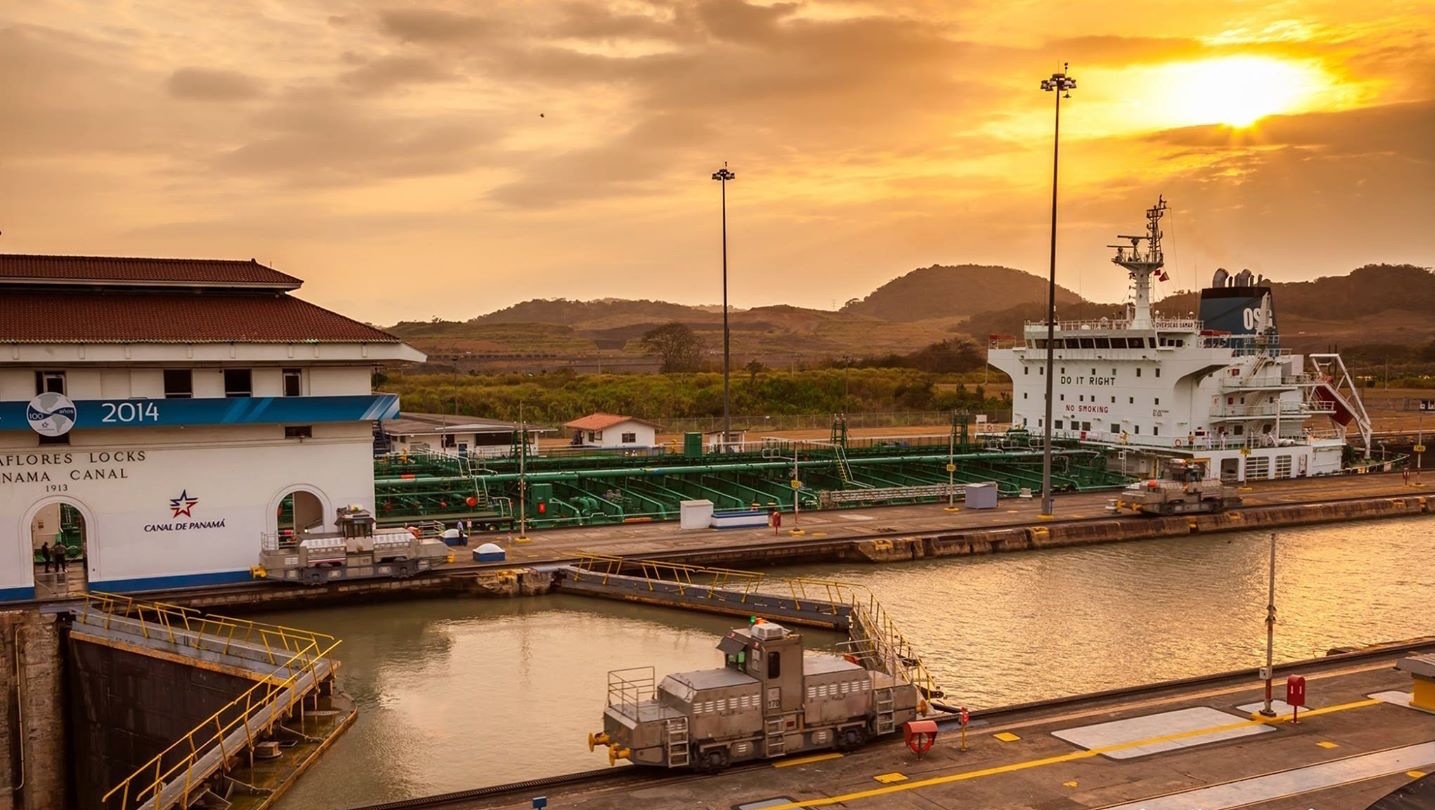
Miraflores locks

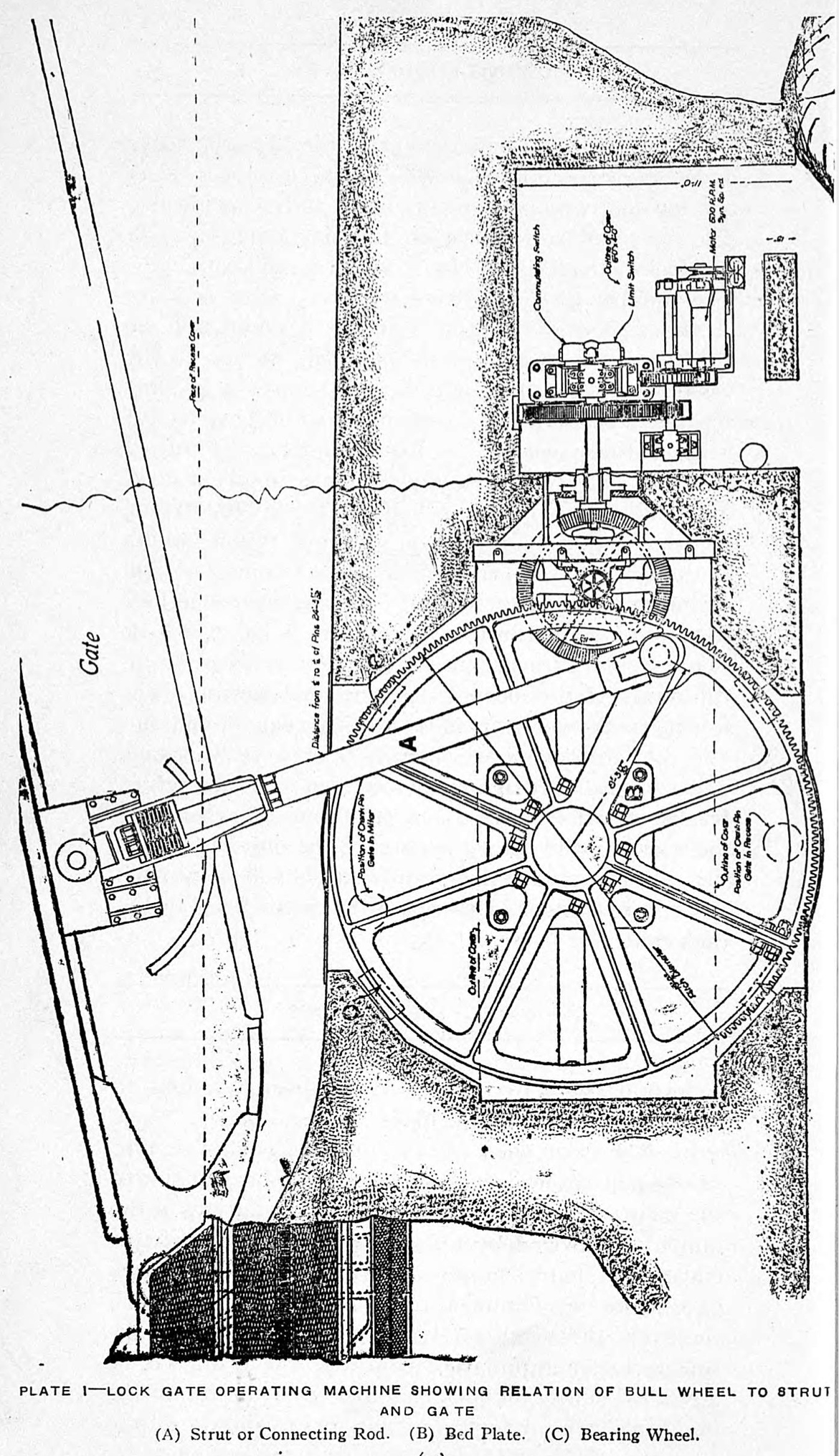
Gate-operating mechanism

The gates separating the chambers in each flight of locks must hold back a considerable weight of water, and must be both reliable and strong enough to withstand accidents, as the failure of a gate could unleash a flood of water downstream. These gates range from 47 to 82 ft (14.33 to 24.99 m) high, depending on position, and are 7 ft (2.13 m) thick. The tallest gates are at Miraflores, due to the large tidal range there. The heaviest leaves weigh 662 t (730 short tons; 652 long tons); the hinges themselves each weigh 16.7 t (36,817 lb). Each gate has two leaves, 65 ft (19.81 m) wide, which close to a "V" shape with the point upstream. This arrangement has the effect that the force of water from the higher side pushes the ends of the gates together firmly. The gates can be opened only when, in the operating cycle, the water level on both sides is equal.

The original gate machinery consisted of a huge drive wheel, powered by an electric motor, to which was attached a connecting rod, which in turn attached to the middle of the gate. The gates are hollow and buoyant, much like the hull of a ship, and are so well balanced that two 19 kW (25 hp) motors are enough to move each gate leaf. If one motor fails, the other can still operate the gate at reduced speed.

All but one chamber contains a pair of auxiliary gates, which can be used to divide the chamber in two. This design allows for the transit of smaller vessels less than 600 ft (183 m) long, such as canal tugs, without using the full quantity of water. The auxiliary gates were originally incorporated because the overwhelming majority of all ships of the early 1900s were less than 600 ft (183 m) long and therefore did not need the full length of the lock chamber.

== Mules ==
From the outset, it was considered an important safety feature that ships be guided through the lock chambers by electric locomotives, known as mulas (mules, named after the animals traditionally used to cross the isthmus of Panama), running on the lock walls. These mules are used for side-to-side and braking control in the locks, which are narrow relative to modern-day ships. Forward motion into and through the locks is actually provided by the ship's engines and not the mules. A ship approaching the locks first pulls up to the guide wall, which is an extension of the center wall of the locks, where it is taken under control by the mules on the wall before proceeding into the lock. As it moves forward, additional lines are taken to mules on the other wall. With large ships, there are two mules on each side at the bow, and two each side at the stern—eight in total, allowing for precise control of the ship. Mules are not used on the new expansion locks.

The mules themselves run on paired 5 ft (1,524 mm) broad gauge railway tracks. The track closest to the canal is used for towing and has rack tracks for geared operation. The track inland is used to return the mules to their starting point and does not have racks except on the steep inclines (1 in 2 or 50% gradient) between lock chambers. Traction is by electric power, supplied through a third rail laid below surface level on the land side. Each mule has a powerful winch; these are used to take cables in or pay them out to keep the ship centered in the lock while moving it from chamber to chamber.

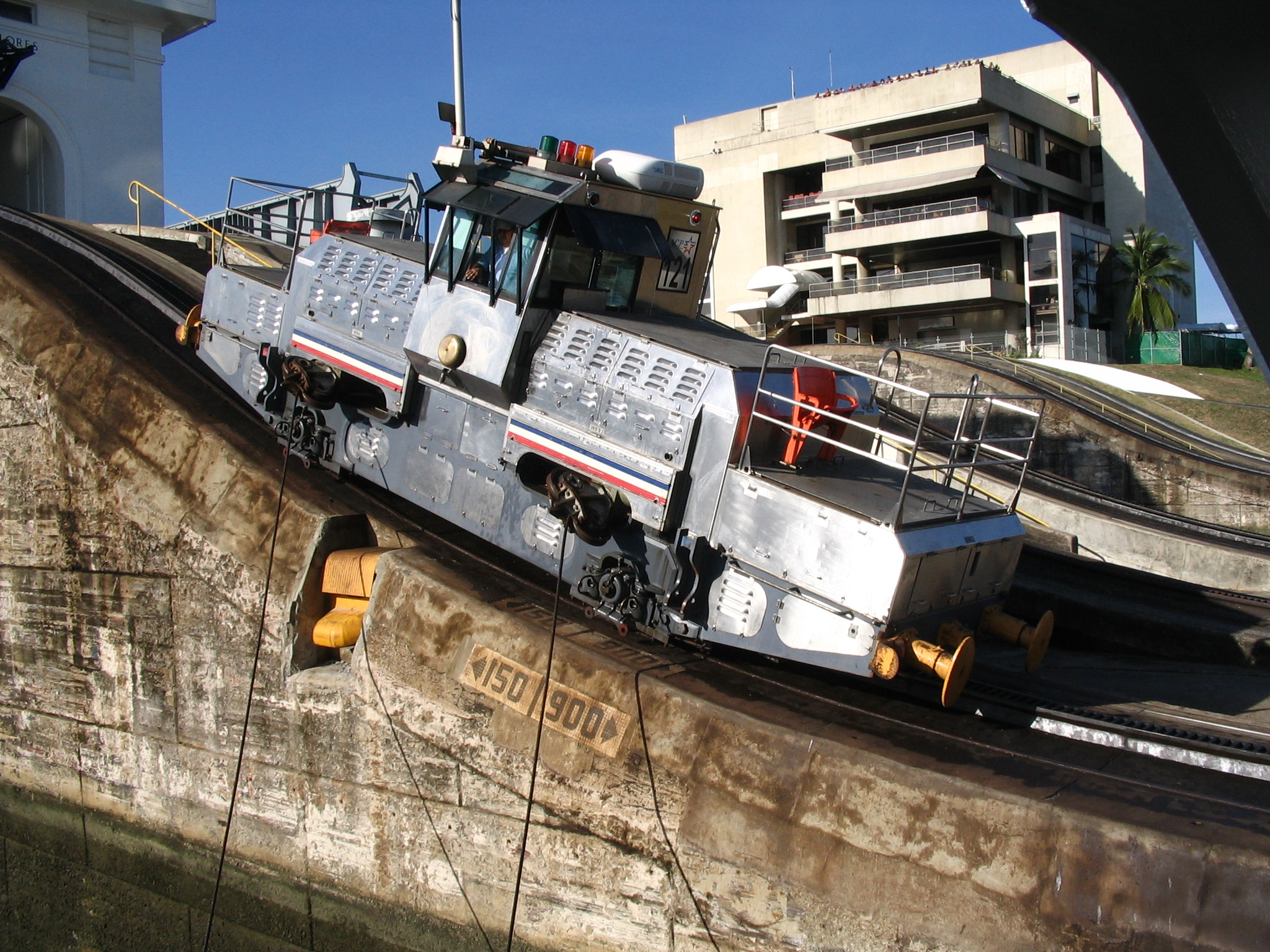
A mule in action at the Miraflores locks

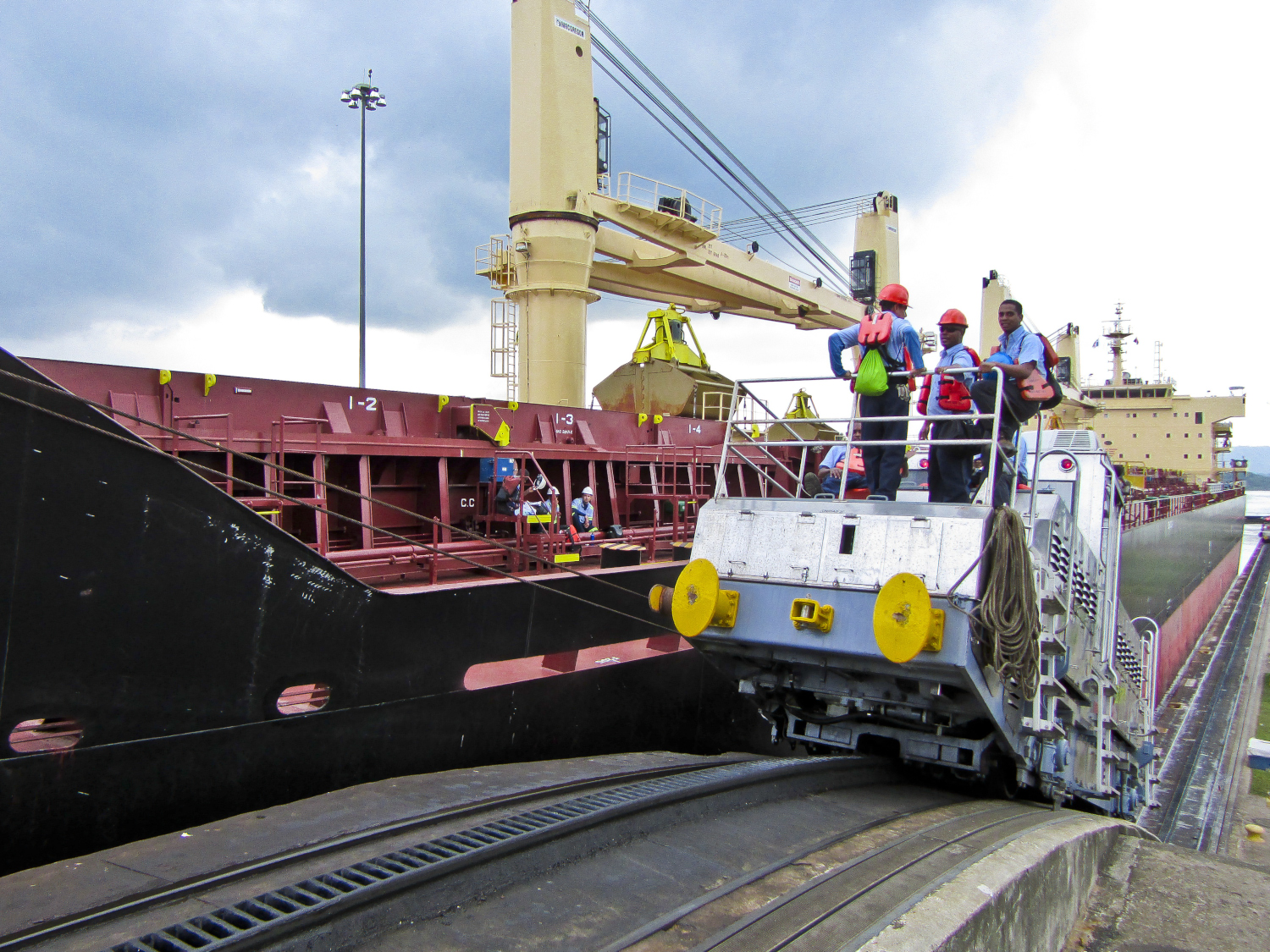
A mule on a slope. The rack is inside the running rail at the left of the track, and the third rail is on the right of the track.

== Safety features ==
A failure of the lock gates—for example, caused by a runaway ship hitting a gate—could unleash a flood on the lands downstream of the locks, as the lake above the locks (Gatun Lake or Miraflores Lake) drains through the lock system. Extra precaution against this is provided by doubling the gates at both ends of the upper chamber in each flight of locks; hence, there are always at least two gates in each flight of locks that would have to fail to allow the higher level of water to pass downstream. The additional gates are 70 ft (21 m) away from the operating gates.

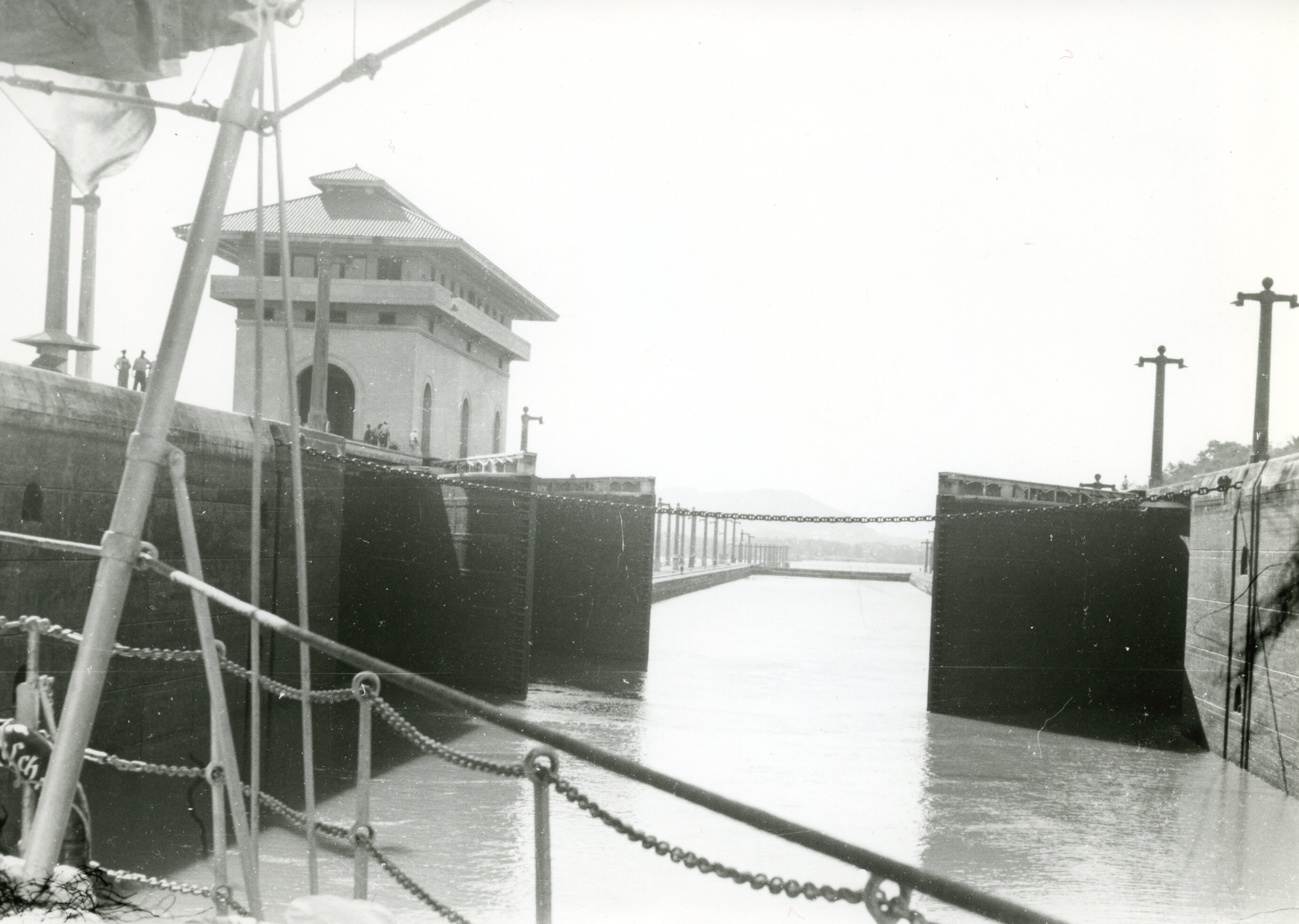
Fender chain (circa 1938)

Originally the locks also featured chain barriers, which were stretched across the lock chambers to prevent a ship from running out of control and ramming a gate, and which were lowered into the lock floor to allow the ship to pass. These fender chains featured elaborate braking mechanisms to allow a ship of up to 10,000 tons to be safely stopped. However, given the precise control of ships made possible by the mules, it was very unlikely that these chains would ever be required. With many modern canal users weighing over 60,000 tons, and given the expense of maintaining them, the fender chains were reduced in number in 1976 and finally removed in 1980.

Beyond this, the original design of the locks had yet another safety feature, emergency dams that could be swung across the locks at the upper end of every flight. These consisted of swinging bridges, from which girders were lowered to the lock floor; steel shutters could then be run down these girders to block the flow of water. Never used, they were removed in the 1950s.

== Controls ==
Since all the lock equipment is operated electrically, the process of locking a ship up or down can be controlled from a central control room, which is located on the center wall of the upper flight of locks. The controls were designed from the outset to minimize the chance of operator error and include a complete model of the locks, with moving components that mirror the state of the real lock gates and valves. In this way, the operator can see exactly what state the locks and water valves are in. Mechanical interlocks are built into the controls to make sure that no component can be moved while another is in an incorrect state—for example, opening the drain and filling the valves of a lock chamber simultaneously.

== Construction ==
The construction of the locks began with the first concrete laid at Gatun, on August 24, 1909, by the Philadelphia-based company Day & Zimmermann (formerly known as Dodge & Day).

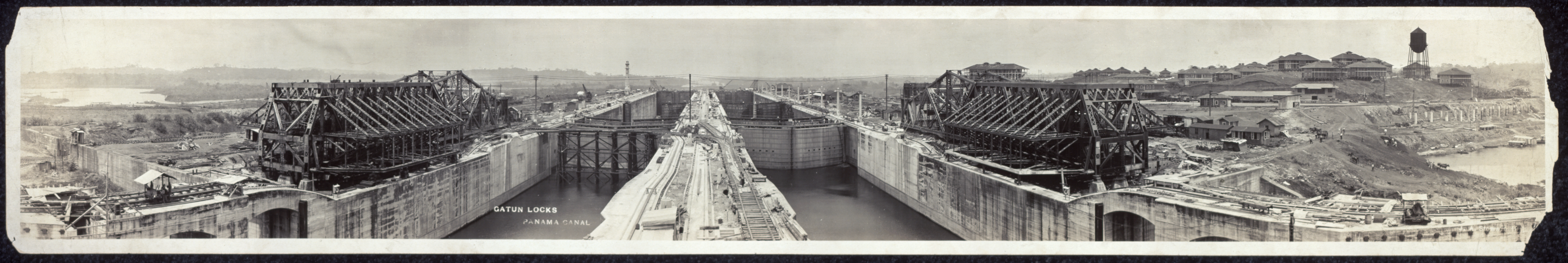
Gatun Locks under construction, circa 1913

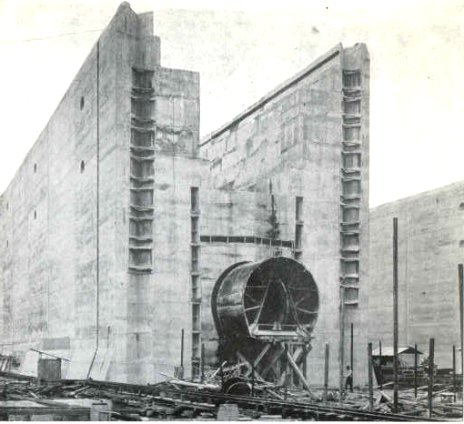
The middle wall of Gatun locks, during construction, in 1910. The man standing below and right of the culvert illustrates the scale.

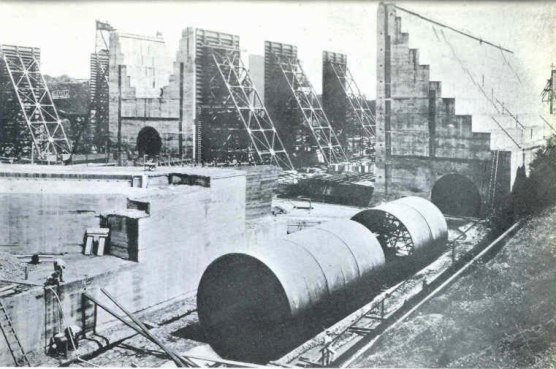
The main culvert forms are seen in the foreground here during construction; behind can be seen the towering wall forms.

The Gatun locks are built into a cut made in a hill bordering the lake, which required the excavation of 5,000,000 cubic yards (3,800,000 cubic metres) of material, mostly rock. The locks themselves were made of 2,046,100 cu yd (1,564,000 m^{3}) of concrete.

The quantity of material needed to construct the locks required extensive measures to be put in place to handle the stone and cement. Stone was brought from Portobelo to the Gatun locks, while the work on the Pacific side used stone quarried from Ancon Hill.

Huge overhead cableways were constructed to transport concrete into the construction at Gatun. 85 ft (26 m) high towers were built on the banks of the canal, and cables of 2.5 in (6 cm) steel wire were strung between them to span the locks. Buckets running on these cables carried up to six tons of concrete at a time into the locks. Electric railways were constructed to take stone, sand, and cement from the docks to the concrete mixing machines, from where another electric railway carried two 6-ton buckets at a time to the cableways. The smaller constructions at Pedro Miguel and Miraflores used cranes and steam locomotives in a similar manner.

The Pacific-side locks were finished first—the single flight at Pedro Miguel in 1911 and Miraflores in May 1913.

The seagoing tug Gatun, an Atlantic entrance working tug used for hauling barges, made the first trial lockage of Gatun Locks on September 26, 1913. The lockage went perfectly, although all valves were controlled manually since the central control board was not yet ready.

== Map ==
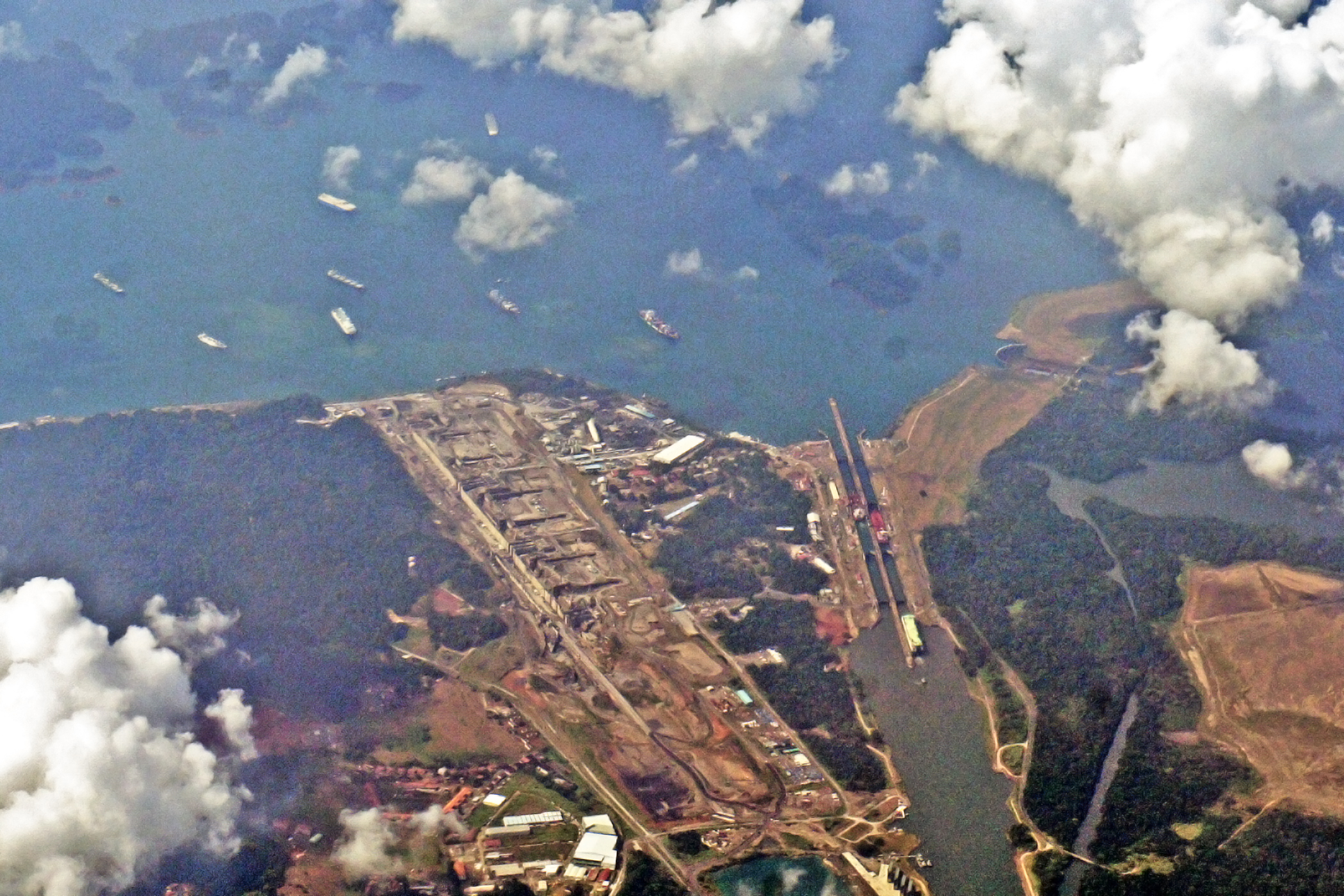
Aerial view of Gatun Locks, Panama Canal. On top, several vessels waiting at Gatun Lake to cross the locks. At the bottom is the canal connecting to the Atlantic Ocean (Caribbean Sea). At the left of the existing locks is the construction area for the new set of locks with water-saving chambers, part of the Panama Canal expansion project which opened for traffic in June 2016.
