= Julia Martz-Fisher =

American judge

Associate Judge for the Circuit Court for Frederick County
- Incumbent
- Assumed office December 2, 2016

Personal details
- Born: April 6, 1968 (age 58) Frederick, Maryland United States
- Education: Hood College, B.A. (1991); University of Baltimore School of Law, J.D. (1999)
- Occupation: Lawyer

Julia Martz-Fisher (born April 6, 1968) is an American lawyer and associate judge of the circuit court for Frederick County.

== Early life and education ==
Martz-Fisher was born in Frederick, Maryland on April 6, 1968. Her parents and grandparents were farmers. She attended Governor Thomas Johnson High School. After graduating, she attended Hood College, receiving a bachelor of arts in political science in 1991. Later, she attended the University of Baltimore School of Law, graduating with a juris doctor in 1999.

== Career ==
While in law school, Martz-Fisher served as a law clerk to Judge G. Edward Dwyer, Jr. from 1998 to 1999. In 1999, she was admitted to the Maryland State Bar Association and joined the Frederick County Bar Association. She was an associate for her brother's law firm, the Law Offices of Walter C. Martz II, from 1999 to 2003, practicing civil law and real estate law. From 2003 to 2009, she was a partner at Martz, Fisher & Drawbaugh, LLC, and from 2009 to 2016 was a partner at Martz & Fisher, LLC, and practiced family law. She also sat on the Board of Directors for the Arc of Frederick County from 2007 through 2009. From 2010 to 2016, Martz-Fisher was also an agent for the Security Title Guarantee Corporation of Baltimore. She served as an agent for the Old Republic National Title Insurance Company from 2013 to 2016.

On November 11, 2016, Governor Larry Hogan appointed Martz-Fisher to fill a sixth Circuit Court seat created by the Maryland General Assembly. On December 2, 2016, Martz-Fisher was sworn in as a judge. In 2021, she was approved to sit on the Domestic Violence Coordinating Council (DVCC) in Frederick County. The Board meets four times annually and provides a report and recommendations to the County Council and County Executive each year.
