= Governor Thomas Johnson High School =

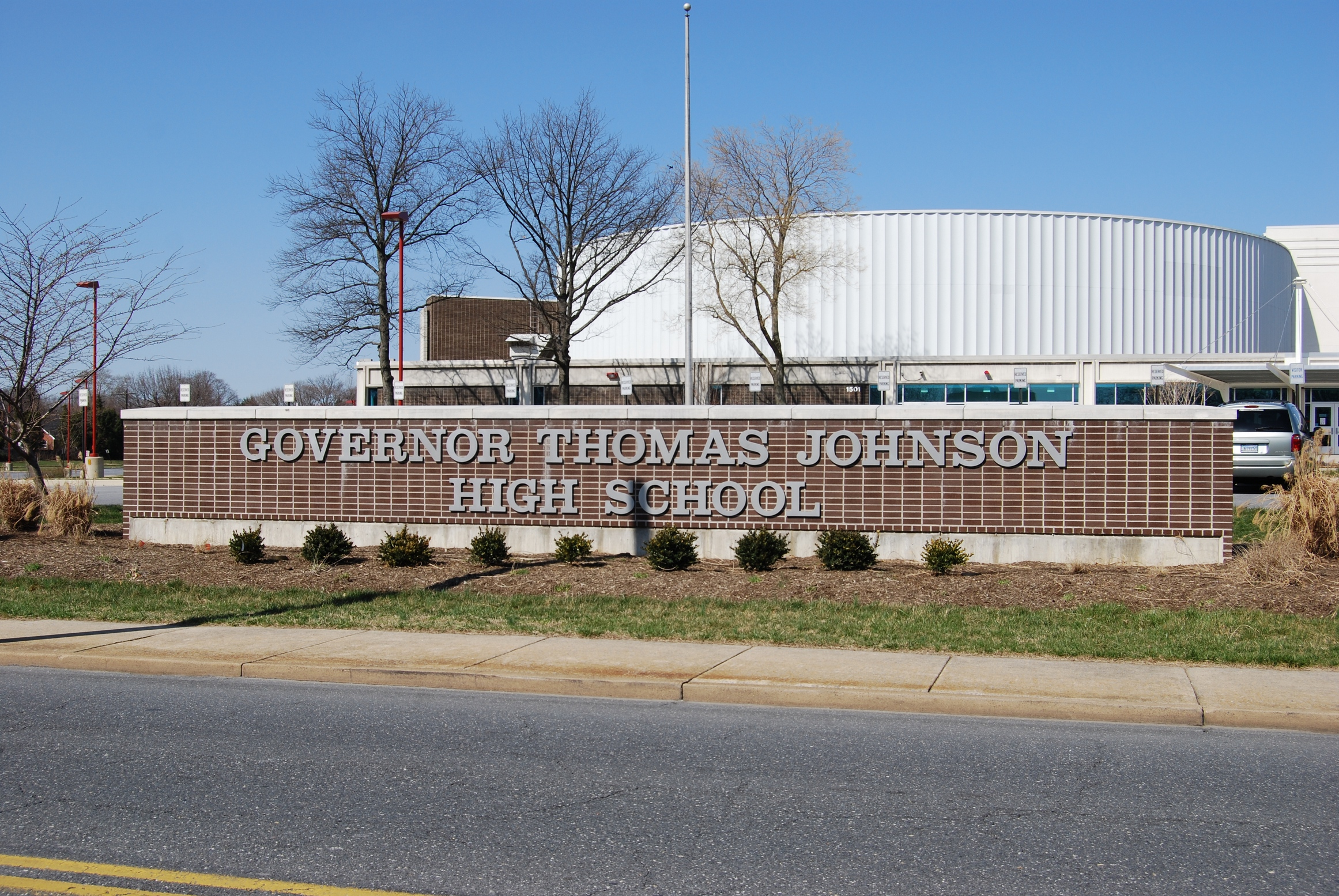
- Home of the Patriots

Location
- 1501 North Market Street; Frederick, Maryland 21701; United States; 39°26′2″N 77°24′18″W

Information
- Type: Public high school
- Opened: September 6, 1966
- School district: Frederick County Public Schools
- Principal: Tracey Kibler
- Teaching staff: 87.00 (FTE)
- Grades: 9-12
- Enrollment: 1,578 (2017–18)
- Student to teacher ratio: 18.14
- Campus: Small City
- Campus size: 40 acres (160,000 m^{2})
- Colors: Red, white, and blue
- Athletics conference: Central Maryland Conference
- Nickname: Patriots
- Rival: Frederick High School
- Newspaper: TJ Chronicle
- Yearbook: Tricorn
- Feeder schools: Monocacy Middle School & Gov. Thomas Johnson Middle School
- Website: edu.fcps.org/gtjhs/

Governor Thomas Johnson High School (GTJHS) is a four-year public high school in Frederick, Maryland, United States. The school is home to the Academy for the Fine Arts, an audition-only visual and performing arts program for talented students in Frederick County from grades 9-12. The school is also home to the naval Junior Reserve Officers' Training Corps for Frederick County (NJROTC).

== Thomas Johnson ==
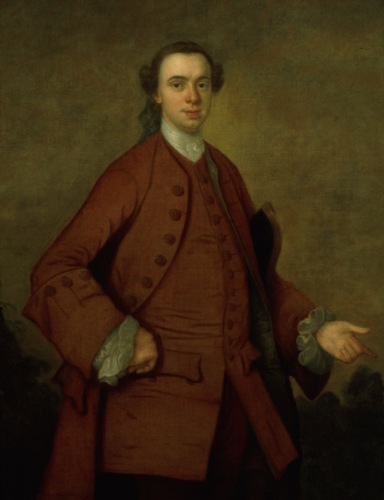
Governor Thomas Johnson

The school is named after former Maryland Governor Thomas Johnson, who was the first post-colonial governor of the state. He was also a delegate to the Continental Congress and an associate justice of the Supreme Court. Johnson himself received no formal early education, and was educated at home alongside his 11 siblings.

== Buildings ==
The school is located on Maryland Route 355, north of 14th Street and southeast of U.S. Route 15. The building has 292,940 square feet (27,215 m^{2}) of space located on 40 acres (16 ha) of land. The address is 1501 N. Market Street in Frederick, MD 21701.

== Students ==
Gov. Thomas Johnson High has around 1,850 students and the demographics were as follows for 2021-2022 year

30.5% White

23.7% African American

35.1% Hispanic

4.7% Multiracial

Thomas Johnson's graduation rate steadily rose throughout the late 1990s and early 2000s. In 2007, the school graduated 93.85%, the highest rate in the past 12 years. The school had a low of 84.91% in 1999.

The school's population had been steadily rising over the years, but began decreasing in 2010 due to the redistricting of some students to Oakdale High School.

Student population
1993	1994	1995	1996	1997	1998	1999	2000	2001	2002	2003	2004	2005	2006	2007	2008	2009	2010	2011	2012	2013	2014
1,339	1,375	1,396	1,407	1,457	1,503	1,548	1,689	1,743	1,858	1,953	1,925	1,987	1,994	1,995	2,022	1,994	2,000	1,681	1,583	1,524	1,489

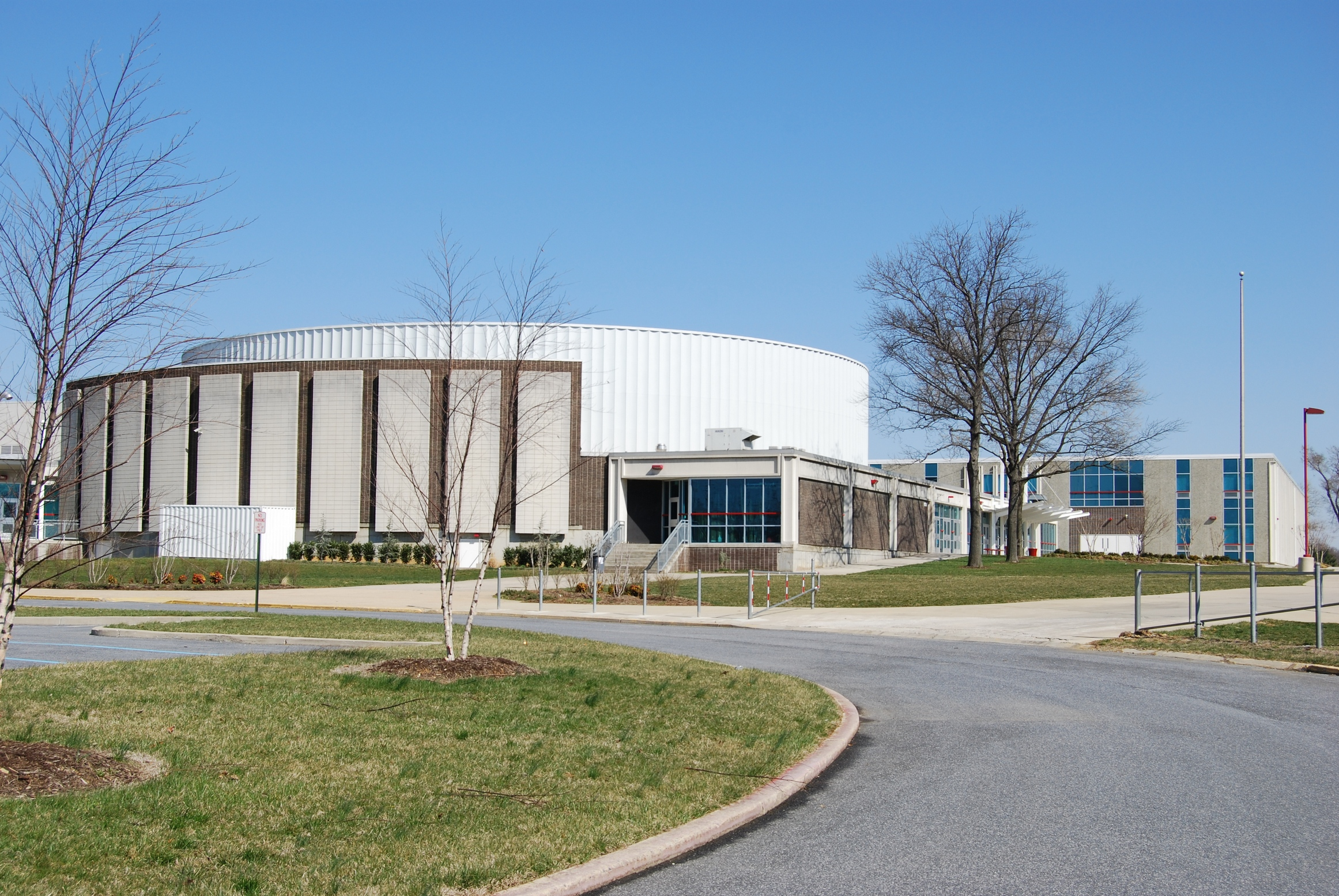
Governor Thomas Johnson High School

== Academies ==
Governor Thomas Johnson High School is home to 2 "academies" for Frederick County Public Schools.

The "Academy for the Fine Arts" has been at GTJHS since the late 1980s. AFA, as it is called, offers various college level classes pertaining to the arts for students in 10th, 11th, and 12th grade.

The Naval Junior Reserve Officers' Training Corps was a new addition to GTJHS for the 2015–16 school year. The program had previously been held at Linganore High School. The NJROTC features an orienteering team, a rifle team, and a drill team.

== Sports ==
State Champions

- 2023 - Boys' outdoor track & field
- 2017 - Unified track
- 2013 - Boys' cross country
- 2012 - Boys' indoor track & field
- 2011 - Boys' outdoor track & field
- 2010 - Boys' outdoor track & field
- 2010 - Boys' indoor track & field
- 2009 - Boys' outdoor track & field
- 2009 - Boys' indoor track & field
- 2006 - Boys' soccer
- 2002 - Baseball
- 2001 - Girls' soccer
- 2000 - Boys' track & field
- 1999 - Boys' basketball
- 1997 - Boys' basketball
- 1997 - Girls' soccer
- 1994 - Softball
- 1992 - Baseball
- 1989 - Girls' basketball
- 1988 - Boys' basketball
- 1986 - Boys' basketball
- 1985 - Boys' basketball
- 1983 - Baseball
- 1983 - Girls' basketball
- 1982 - Boys' basketball
- 1982 - Football
- 1975 - Boys' basketball

== Notable alumni ==
- Virginia Cha, anchor on MSNBC Live, reporter for CNN
- Brent Comer, actor
- Nate Hairston, cornerback for the New York Jets
- Branden Kline, Major League Baseball player for the Baltimore Orioles
- Julia Martz-Fisher, Associate Judge for the Circuit Court for Frederick County.
- Terence Morris, former NBA and Israel Basketball Premier League basketball player
- Bryan Voltaggio, chef, Top Chef runner-up
- Michael Voltaggio, chef, Top Chef winners

== See also ==
- List of high schools in Maryland
- Frederick County Public Schools
