= Jules G. Fisher =

American politician

Jules Gabriel Fisher (Apr 15, 1874 – May 14, 1943) was a Louisiana State Senator from Barataria, Louisiana, serving from 1924 to 1943. Fisher became the owner of a major shrimp processing facility known as "Manila Village", located in Barataria Bay between Grand Isle and Lafitte and west of Port Sulphur, Louisiana. For many years, this camp village on stilts served as his part-time residence. Fisher was elected to the Jefferson Parish Police Jury and served as its president, was a delegate on the Louisiana State Constitution Committee, and was a dean of the State Senate when he died at the age of 69.

== Family ==
Jules Gabriel Fisher was born in Barataria (Lafitte), Louisiana to Jules Marks Fisher of Russia and Annie Fisher of Prussia (Germany) in 1874. Fisher's grandfather and grandmother, Johan and Therese, immigrated to the United States from Le Havre, France in 1849 with sons Jules Marks Fisher (Jules Gabriel's father, age 6) and Charles (Jules Mark's brother, age 2), likely escaping the Franco-Prussian war. Jules Gabriel Fisher had an older brother, Isidore, born in 1872.

Once settled, Jules Marks owned and operated a grocery store in the remote fishing community of Lafitte, where the young Fisher boys would grow up. In October, 1900, Jules Gabriel Fisher married Sadie Wachsman at the Temple of Hebrew Union in Greenville, Mississippi. Together, they had two children: a son, Carl Abram Fisher, born in 1902, and a daughter, Juliette, born in 1907. His son, Carl, died early at the age of 35 in 1937. His daughter died in 1965. Fisher's wife, Sadie, died two years following him in 1945.

Though Fisher's political career and public persona relied heavily upon his residence and focus being in Barataria and Lafitte, which are within Jefferson Parish, he was arguably more a resident of New Orleans. A 1937 publication issued by his own political campaign to tout his political accomplishments claimed that, "Fisher was born in Lafitte and has been a resident of Jefferson Parish his entire life." Yet, Fisher is actually recorded as residing in New Orleans much of the time. U.S. Census records from 1910 and 1920 list Jules G. Fisher as residing at Manila Village, the shrimp processing facility and encampment at Barataria Bay, which he owned and operated. But, in 1910, the Fisher family was recorded at 3450 Magazine Street in New Orleans, listing Jules as “Gabriel Fisher.” Shortly thereafter, Fisher's father-in-law, Mendel Wachsman, was reported to have died at Fisher's residence on Magazine in 1911. In 1918, Fisher's registration for the U.S. Military Selective Service again declares, "Manila Village" as his residence. Yet, in 1920, the U.S. Census recorded Fisher's family as living at 3707 Danneel Street, New Orleans. Finally, in 1943, Fisher was reported to have died at his home at 2401 Octavia Street, New Orleans. It is unclear if facts regarding his residence would have jeopardized his eligibility to serve in any of his elected political seats, which were for Jefferson Parish and not Orleans. Certainly, his personal, commercial and political interests were all within the back bayous of Jefferson Parish.

== Political career ==
Jules Fisher began his political career when he was elected to the Jefferson Parish Police Jury in 1916. Fisher was appointed president and held his seat and position for eight years. At the time Fisher entered Jefferson Parish government, Louis H.Marrero had been in power for decades, possessing multiple political positions, including Sherriff and Louisiana Senator. As elections approached for 1920, Jules Fisher boldly predicted the pending defeat and demise of Marrero and his political machine at the polls. Surely, Marrero was indeed defeated, opening opportunities for new political leaders to emerge.

Fisher was appointed to the Louisiana Constitutional Convention of 1921, bringing with it exposure to affairs of the state. Then, in 1924, Fisher was elected to the Louisiana Senate as the representative of its 10th District, comprising Jefferson, St. John and St. Charles Parishes. Fisher's political platform was based on representing the needs and interests of the common man. He would be reelected to his seat in the Senate over several elections through the rest of his life, dying while still in office in 1943.

Jules Fisher was an outspoken supporter and proponent of Huey P. Long, who was first elected Governor of Louisiana in 1928, as Fisher was into his first term as Louisiana Senator. In the elections that year, Long was competing in a three-person race with two other candidates. Fisher was part of a group that coalesced around Long and convinced the remaining candidates to withdraw after the first primary election, handing Long the win for the Governor's seat.

Fisher and Long developed a strong political bond afterwards. In 1929, Huey Long was brought up on impeachment charges. Senator Fisher was one of 15 men to sign a round robin that declared that they would not vote to impeach, no matter the charges. Ultimately, Long was not impeached.

Fisher attributed his strong relationship with Long as being the reason why Jefferson Parish was the recipient of many municipal infrastructure projects completed by the state. In 1930, Lafitte and Barataria was accessible only by ferry except for one very precarious pontoon bridge at Crown Point, referred to as "Wagner’s Ferry Bridge". Though the area was rural and extremely remote, Long's administration did indeed construct a new modern swing bridge for vehicles at this location.

In 1936, Fisher actively championed state legislation calling for the creation of a ship channel, referred to as the "Jefferson Seaway," that would connect Westwego and Grand Isle, the path of which would cross his shrimp drying business at Manila Village. Though the ship channel was never built, the Barataria Bay Waterway was dredged for barge traffic in 1960 through a federal project, years after Fisher's death.

== Shrimp Industry ==
When Jules Fisher was a young boy in the 1880s, his father owned and operated a grocery store in Lafitte. This small area is essentially a narrow strip of high ground surrounded by swamps, marshland, bayous and bays, and prior to the discovery of crude oil deposits in the 1930s, seafood and trapping were its foremost industries. Near this time, the small platform encampment called “Manila Village” was developed by a Filipino man named Jacinto Quintin de la Cruz. It was located along the northern shore of Barataria Bay just west of Bayou Dupont. In 1900, Jules Fisher was living with his brother Isidore and his family, both working as “grocers.” It is not known when Fisher came to possess Manila Village and its shrimp drying operation, but in 1896 Fisher is quoted at length by the newspaper, describing in great detail the shrimp drying operations by "Chinamen" in the Barataria area. By 1909 it is clear that Jules Fisher was the owner of “Fisher Shrimp Company” at the encampment of Manila Village.

Shrimp and wildlife were a very big part of the Fisher family. In 1925, Jules Fisher was the President of the Louisiana Fur Industries. At the time of his death in 1926, his brother Isidore owned and operated a large seafood canning plant. Manila Village prospered throughout the time that Jules Fisher owned it, which was up to his death in 1943. But a little more than 20 years later, Hurricane Betsy completely destroyed Manila Village in 1965, and it was never redeveloped.

== Death ==
Jules Gabriel Fisher died at his home in New Orleans on Octavia Street on May 14, 1943. The funeral was held at Tharp-Sontheimer-Tharp Funeral Home at Claiborne Avenue and Milan, and religious services were held at the Gates of Prayer Temple on Napoleon Avenue. Fisher was interred in a plot with his son at the Gates of Prayer Cemetery No. 2 on Joseph Street in New Orleans. Two years later, his wife would also be interred in the same plot.

== Religion and immigration ==
It is apparent that Jules Fisher and his family were Jewish as both his marital and funeral services were held in Hebrew temples, in 1900 and 1943. Every member of his immediate household is interred in a Hebrew cemetery associated with the Gates of Prayer temple. According to the temple: "Congregation Gates of Prayer is the oldest ongoing congregation in Greater New Orleans, established on January 6, 1850. The founders of the congregation, some of whose descendants are members of the congregation to this day, were primarily German Jews from the provinces of Alsace and Lorraine. They were escaping from the terrible conditions that existed during the Franco-Prussian Wars." Fisher's grandfather and grandmother did indeed arrive in New Orleans in 1849 from France at the time of the Franco-Prussian wars when the temple was founded. Thus, it is likely that the Fisher family immigrated to New Orleans due to these circumstances.

== Legacy ==
The only public high school in the Lafitte area is Fisher Middle-High School, which was named for Jules Fisher.
