= Atlantic (disambiguation) =

The Atlantic Ocean is the second largest of the world's oceans, that separates the old world from the new world.

Atlantic may also refer to:

== Places ==
=== In Canada ===
- Atlantic, Nova Scotia
- Atlantic Canada

=== In the United States ===
- Atlantic, Iowa
- Atlantic, Massachusetts
- Atlantic, North Carolina, an unincorporated community in eastern Carteret County
- Atlantic, Pennsylvania
- Atlantic, Seattle, a neighborhood in Washington state
- Atlantic, Virginia
- Atlantic City, New Jersey
- Atlantic County, New Jersey
- Atlantic Peak (Colorado), a mountain

== Art, entertainment, and media ==
=== Companies and labels ===
- Atlantic Books, an independent British publishing house
- Atlantic Monthly Press, an American publishing house
- Atlantic Entertainment Group, a defunct movie studio company
- Atlantic FM, a former radio station serving Cornwall, United Kingdom
- Atlantic Records, a record company

=== Music ===
- The Atlantics, an Australian surf rock band formed in the early 1960s

==== Songs ====
- "Atlantic" (song), by Keane
- "Atlantic", a song by Björk from Vessel (DVD)
- "Atlantic", a song by Thrice from Vheissu
- "Atlantic", a song by Sleep Token from This Place Will Become Your Tomb

=== Other art, entertainment, and media ===
- Atlantic (film), a 1929 black and white British film
- The Atlantic, an American magazine founded as The Atlantic Monthly in 1857
- Atlantic., a 2014 Dutch film
- Atlantic (2015 film), an Irish documentary film, awarded Best Irish Documentary at the 2016 Dublin International Film Festival

== Enterprises and organizations ==
- Atlantic (cinema), a movie theater in Warsaw, Poland
- Atlantic (toy company), a defunct Italian toy manufacturer
- Atlantic (supermarkets), a defunct supermarket chain in Greece
- Atlantic Broadband, a cable company in Massachusetts
- Atlantic City Electric, a division of Elexon supplying electricity in New Jersey
- Atlantic LNG, a liquefied natural gas producing company based in Trinidad and Tobago
- Atlantic Petroleum, a former oil company in the United States
- Atlantic Petroleum (Faroe Islands), an oil and gas production company
- Atlantic Philanthropies, a defunct private foundation
- Atlantic Technological University, north-western Ireland
- Atlantic University, Virginia Beach, Virginia
- Groupe Atlantic, a French climate control engineering company

== Sports ==
- Atlantic Championship Series, developmental open-wheel racing series in North America
- Atlantic League of Professional Baseball, an American professional baseball league

== Structures ==
- Atlantic Building or Edificio Atlantic, a condominium building in Havana, Cuba
- The Atlantic (Atlanta), a skyscraper in Atlanta, Georgia, United States

== Transportation ==
=== Airlines ===
- Air Atlantic, a Canadian airline
- Atlantic Airways, a Faroese airline company

=== Aircraft ===
- Breguet Atlantic, a French long-range maritime patrol aircraft (1961)

=== Motor vehicles ===
- Atlantic (1921 automobile), a defunct automobile company
- Austin Atlantic, a British car produced by the Austin Motor Company from 1949 to 1952
- Fisker Atlantic, a 2012 plug-in electric concept car

=== Railroads and trains ===
- Atlantic (locomotive), name of an early steam-powered locomotive of the Baltimore and Ohio Railroad
- Atlantic station (Los Angeles Metro)
- Atlantic station (Staten Island Railway)
- Atlantic (train), a named passenger train operated by Canadian Pacific Railway and later Via Rail
- Atlantic, a type of steam locomotive with a 4-4-2 wheel arrangement (UIC classification 2B1)

=== Ships ===
- Atlantic (ship), any one of several vessels by that name
- Atlantic (yacht), a three-masted gaff-rigged schooner
- Atlantic 85-class lifeboats, lifeboats that serve the shores of the United Kingdom and Ireland as a part of the RNLI inshore fleet

== Other uses ==
- Atlantic (period) of palaeoclimatology
- Atlantic languages (formerly West Atlantic), a language family in West Africa
- Atlantic (horse), British-bred Thoroughbred racehorse of the 1870s

== See also ==
- Atlantik (disambiguation)
- Atlantique (disambiguation)
- Atlantic Beach (disambiguation)
- Atlantic Bridge (disambiguation)
- Atlantic City (disambiguation)
