= Panamax =

Size limits for ships that can transit the Panama Canal

General characteristics Panamax
- Tonnage: 52,500 DWT
- Length: 289.56 m (950 ft)
- Beam: 32.31 m (106 ft)
- Height: 57.91 m (190 ft)
- Draft: 12.04 m (39.5 ft)
- Capacity: 5,000 TEU
- Notes: Opened 1914

General characteristics New Panamax
- Tonnage: 120,000 DWT
- Length: 366 m (1,201 ft)
- Beam: 51.25 m (168 ft)
- Height: 57.91 m (190 ft)
- Draft: 15.2 m (50 ft)
- Capacity: 14,000 TEU
- Notes: Opened 2016

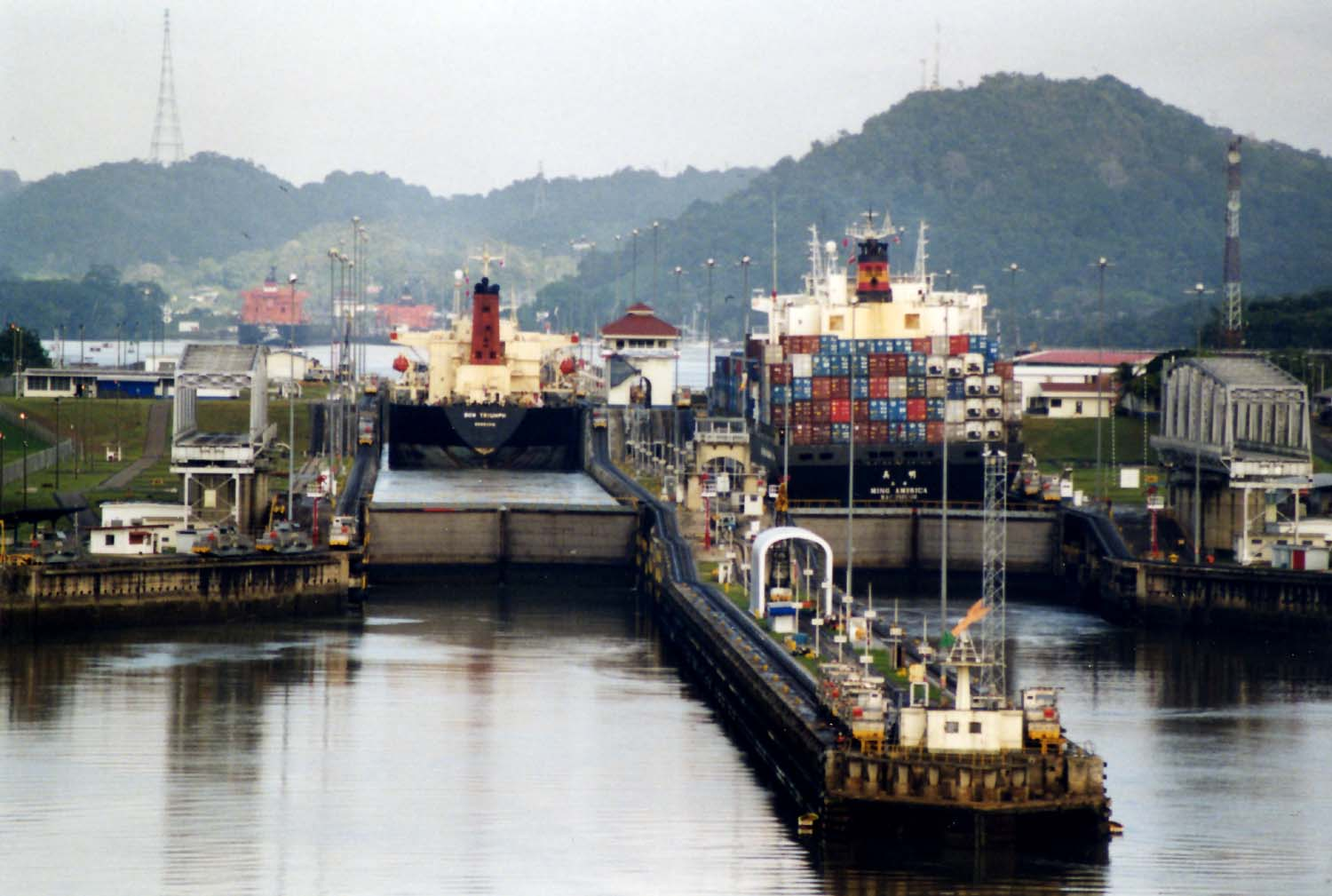
Two Panamax ships seen almost touching the walls of the Miraflores Locks.

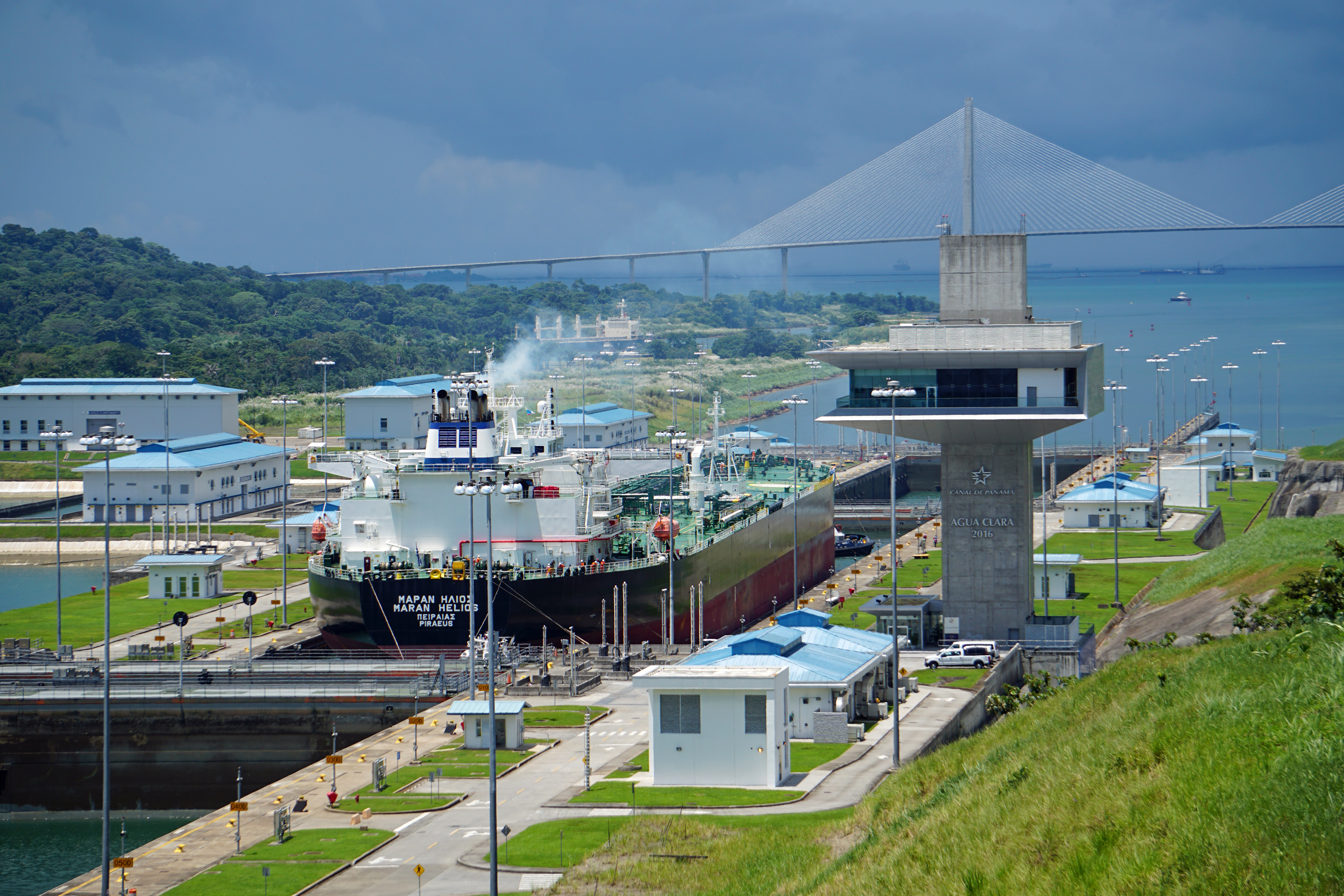
Neopanamax ship passing through the new Agua Clara Locks

Panamax and New Panamax (or Neopanamax) are the size limits for ships traveling through the Panama Canal. The limits and requirements are published by the Panama Canal Authority (ACP) in a publication titled "Vessel Requirements". These requirements also describe topics like exceptional dry seasonal limits, propulsion, communications, and detailed ship design.

The allowable size is limited by the width and length of the available lock chambers, by the depth of water in the canal, and by the height of the Bridge of the Americas since that bridge's construction, along with the clearance under the Atlantic and Centennial Bridges since their constructions in 2019 and 2004 respectively. These dimensions give clear parameters for ships destined to traverse the Panama Canal and have influenced the design of cargo ships, naval vessels, and passenger ships.

Panamax specifications have been in effect since the opening of the canal in 1914. In 2009, the ACP published the "New Panamax" specification, which came into effect when the canal's third set of locks, larger than the original two, opened on 26 June 2016. Ships that do not fall within the Panamax-sizes may be called post-Panamax, super-Panamax, or Capesize.

The increasing prevalence of vessels of the maximum size is a problem for the canal, as a Panamax ship is a tight fit that requires precise control of the vessel in the locks, possibly resulting in longer lock time, and requiring that these ships transit in daylight. Because the largest ships traveling in opposite directions cannot pass safely within the Culebra Cut, the canal effectively operates an alternating one-way system for these ships.

== Ship dimensions ==
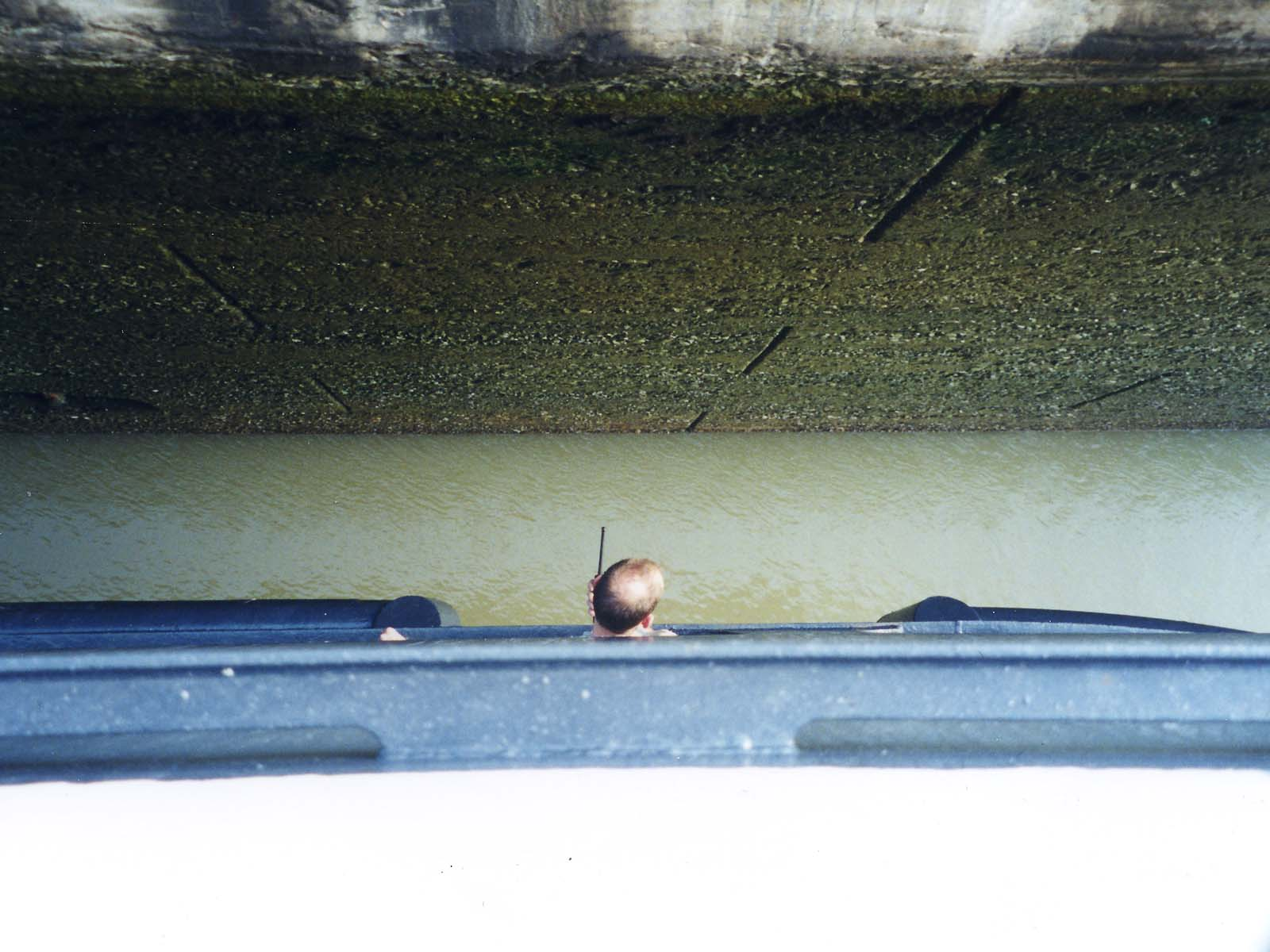
An officer monitors the clearance of the cruise ship MS Ryndam as she traverses the lock.

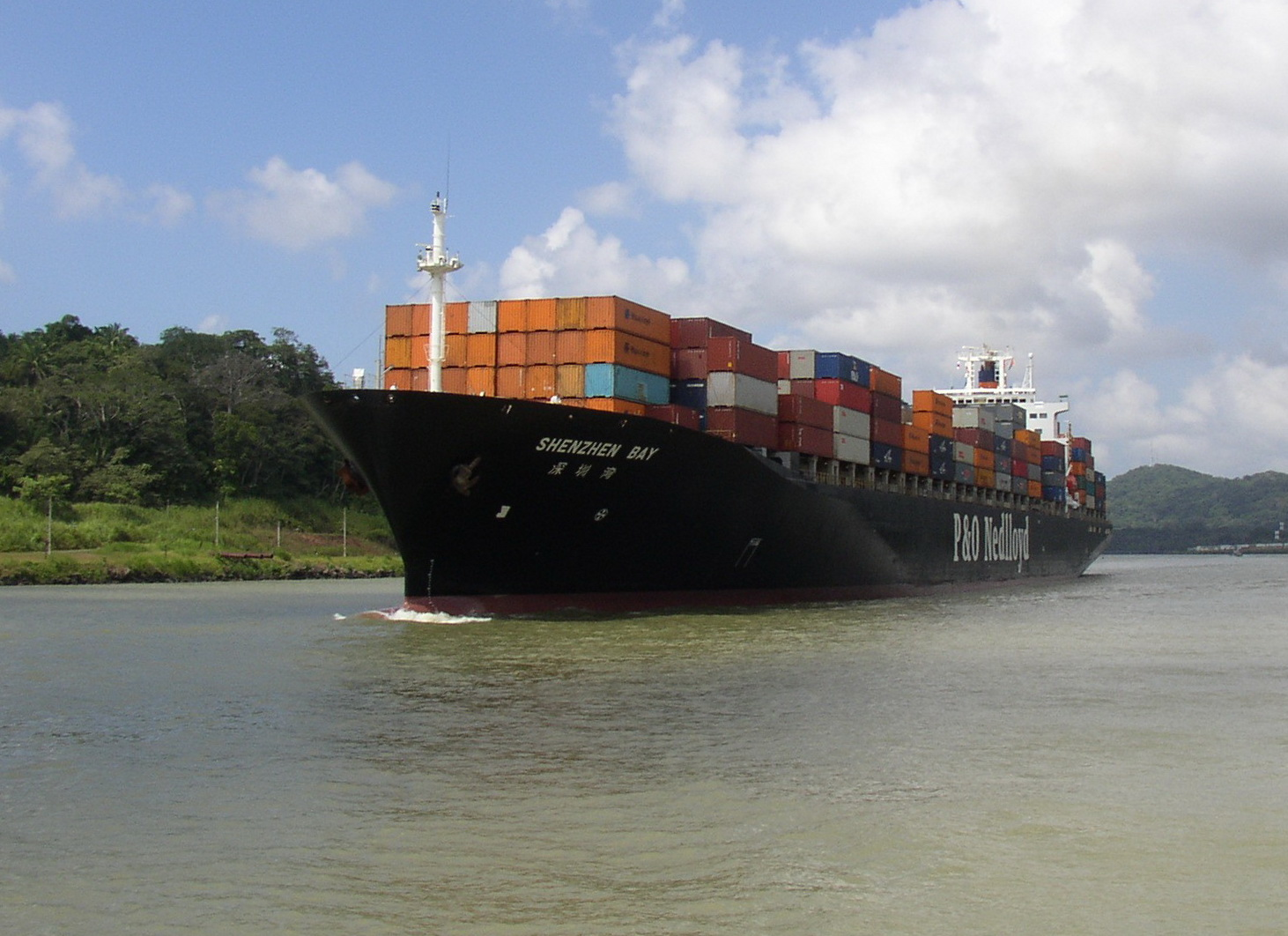
Panamax container ship

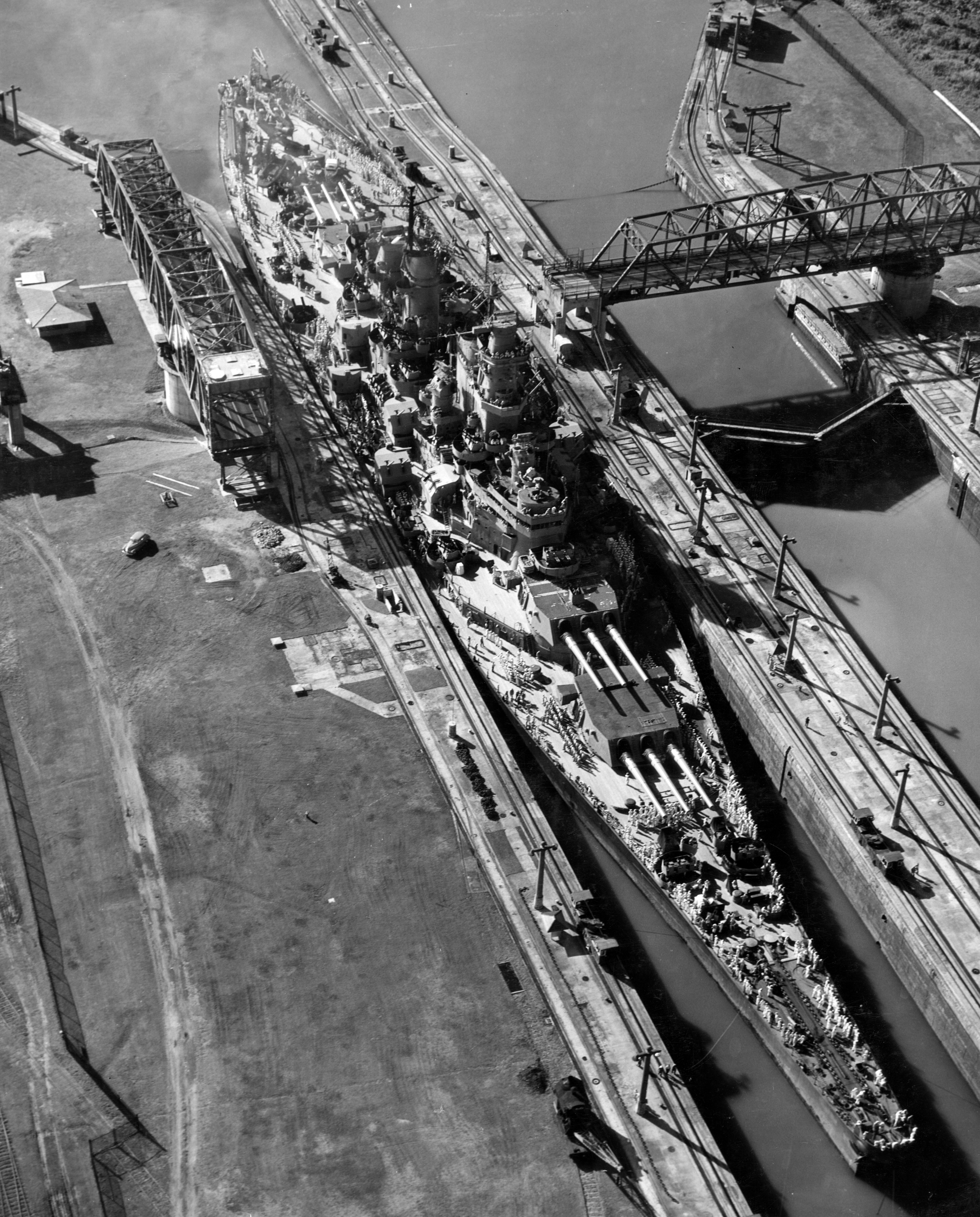
USS Missouri, one of the Iowa-class battleships, makes a very tight fit as she passes through the Miraflores Locks of the Panama Canal in October 1945.

Panamax is determined principally by the dimensions of the canal's original lock chambers, each of which is 33.5 m (110 ft) wide, 320.0 m (1,050 ft) long, and 12.6 m (41.2 ft) deep. The usable length of each lock chamber is 304.8 m (1,000 ft). The available water depth in the lock chambers varies, but the shallowest depth is at the south sill of the Pedro Miguel Locks and is 12.6 m (41.2 ft) at a Miraflores Lake level of 16.6 m (54 ft 6 in). The clearances under the Bridge of the Americas at Balboa, the Centennial Bridge near the Culebra Cut, and the Atlantic Bridge in Colon, are the three limiting factors on a vessel's overall height for both Panamax and Neopanamax ships; the exact figure depends on the water level.

The maximum dimensions allowed for a ship transiting the canal using the original locks and the new locks (New Panamax) are:

=== Length ===
Overall (including protrusions): 289.6 m (950 ft). Exceptions:

- Container ship and passenger ship: 294.1 m (965 ft)
- Tug-barge combination, rigidly connected: 274.3 m (900 ft) overall
- Other nonself-propelled vessels-tug combination: 259.1 m (850 ft) overall;

New Panamax increases the allowable length to 366 m (1,201 ft).

=== Width (beam) ===
Width over outer surface of the shell plating: 32.3 m (106 ft). General exception: 32.6 m (107 ft), when draft is less than 11.3 m (37 ft) in tropical fresh water.

New Panamax originally allowed a width of 49 m (161 ft). This was expanded to 51.25 m (168.1 ft) during June 2018.

=== Draft ===
The maximum allowable draft is 12.04 m (39.5 ft) in tropical freshwater (TFW). The name and definition of TFW is created by ACP using the freshwater Lake Gatún as a reference. The salinity and temperature of water affect its density, and hence how deep a ship will float in the water. The lake's water has a density of 995.4 kg/m^{3}, at 29.1 °C (84 °F). The physical limit is set by the lower (seaside) entrance of the Pedro Miguel locks. When the water level in Lake Gatún is low during an exceptionally dry season, the maximum permitted draft may be reduced. Such a restriction is published three weeks in advance, so ship loading plans can take appropriate measures.

New Panamax increases allowable draft to 15.2 m (49.9 ft); however, due to low rainfall, the Canal Authority limited draft to 13.1 m (43 ft) when the new locks opened in June 2016, increasing it to 13.4 m (44 ft) in August, "based on the current level of Gatun Lake and the weather forecast for the following weeks."

=== Height ===
Vessel height is limited to 57.9 m (190 ft) measured from the waterline to the vessel's highest point; the limit also pertains to New Panamax in order to pass under the Bridge of the Americas at Balboa harbor. Exception: 62.5 m (205 ft) when passage at low water (MLWS) at Balboa is possible.

=== Cargo capacity ===
A Panamax cargo ship would typically have a DWT of 65,000–80,000 tonnes, but its maximum cargo would be about 52,500 tonnes during a transit due to draft limitations in the canal. New Panamax ships can carry 120,000 DWT. Panamax container ships can carry 5,000 twenty-foot equivalent units (TEU), with 13,000 TEU for New Panamax vessels.

=== Records ===
The longest ship ever to transit the original locks was San Juan Prospector, now Marcona Prospector, an ore-bulk-oil carrier that is 297 m (973 ft) long, with a beam of 32 m (106 ft). The widest ships to transit are the South Dakota class and Iowa class battleships, which have a maximum beam of 32.97 m (108 ft 2 in), leaving less than 15 cm (6 in) margin of error between the ships and the walls of the locks.

=== Routes ===
Major Panamax bulk trade routes include Brazil to China, Australia to China, U.S. to China, China to China, and Australia to India.

== Expansion ==
As early as the 1930s, new locks were proposed for the Panama Canal to ease congestion and to allow larger ships to pass. The project was abandoned in 1942.

On October 22, 2006, the Panama Canal Authority (with the support of the Electoral Tribunal) held a referendum for Panamanian citizens to vote on the Panama Canal expansion project. The expansion was approved by a wide margin, with support from about 78% of voters. Construction began in 2007, and after several delays, the new locks opened for commercial traffic on 26 June 2016.

=== Neopanamax ===
Construction of another set of larger locks led to the creation of the "Neopanamax" or "New Panamax" ship classification, based on the new locks' dimensions of 427 m (1,401 ft) in length, 55 m (180 ft) in beam, and 18.3 m (60.0 ft) in depth. Naval architects and civil engineers began taking into account these dimensions for container ships. With the new locks, the Panama Canal is able to handle vessels with overall length of 366 m (1,201 ft), 49 m (161 ft) beam (increased by the Canal Authority effective 1 June 2018 to 51.25 m (168.1 ft), to accommodate ships with 20 rows of containers) and 15.2 m (50 ft) draft, and cargo capacity up to 14,000 twenty-foot equivalent units (TEU); previously, it could only handle vessels up to about 5,000 TEU. The Neopanamax standard accommodates ships up to 120,000 DWT.

=== Impact on world ports ===
==== United States ====
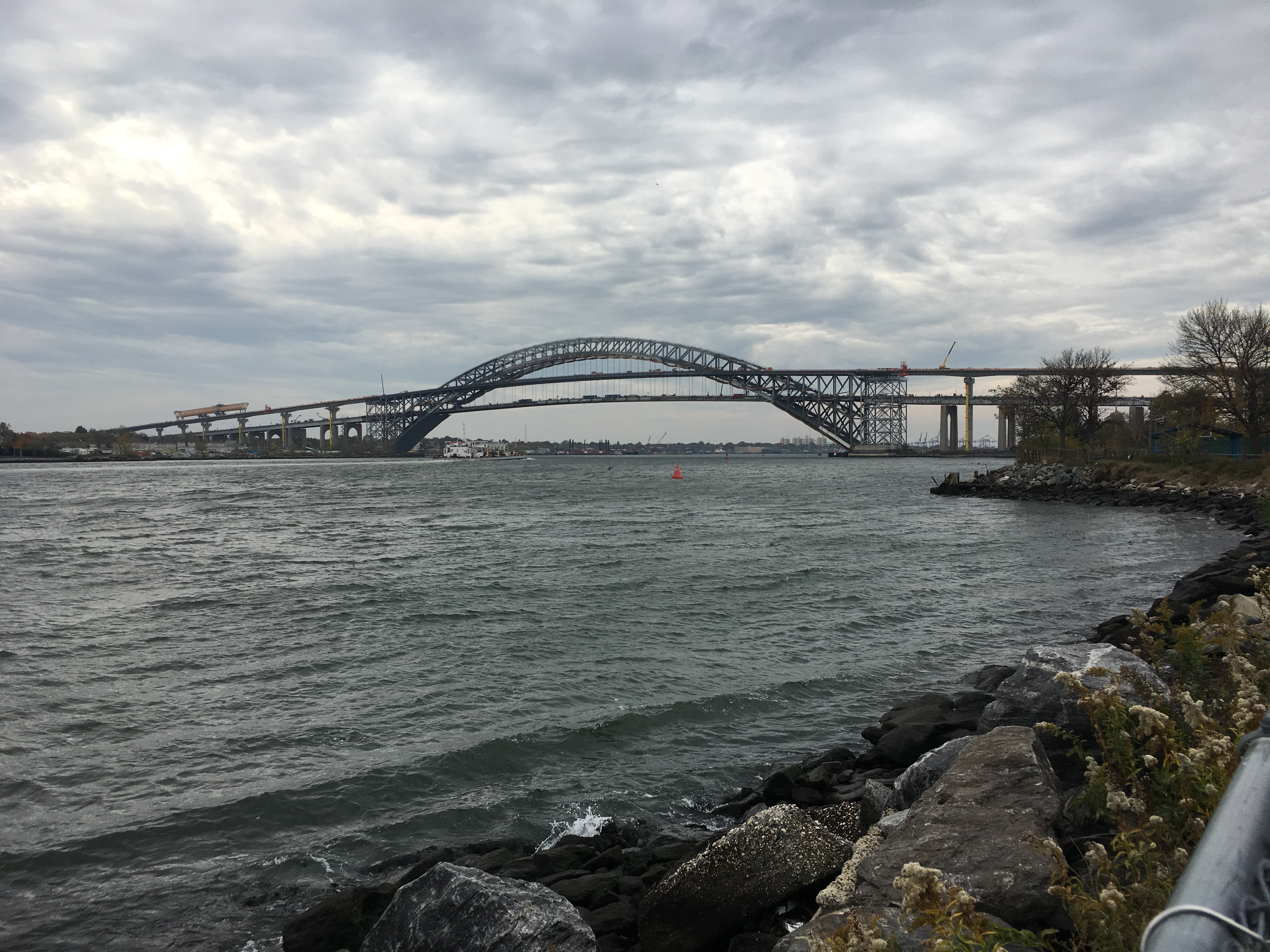
Navigational clearance under the Bayonne Bridge in New York harbor was increased to accommodate New Panamax ships by building a new, higher roadway inside the arch and then removing the lower roadway.

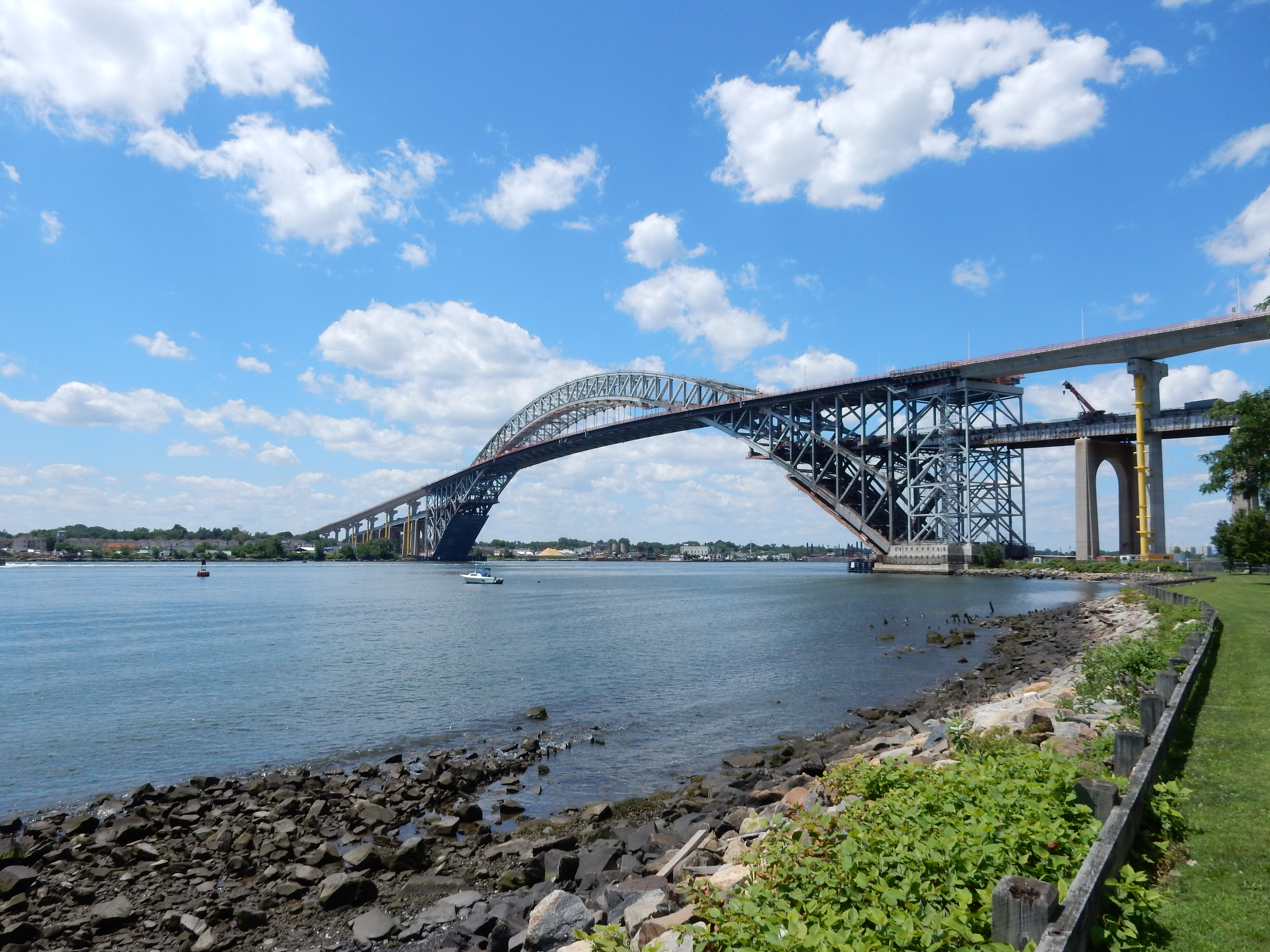
Bayonne Bridge with old roadway removed over the water

Several ports, including the ports of New York and New Jersey, Norfolk, and Baltimore, all on the East Coast of the United States, have already increased their depth to at least 15 m (50 ft) to accommodate New Panamax ships; in 2015 the Port of Miami achieved the same in a project known as the "Deep Dredge" and is the closest deepwater port to the Panama Canal in the US. In 2017, the Port Authority of New York and New Jersey raised the clearance of the Bayonne Bridge to 66 m (215 ft), at a cost of $1.7 billion, to allow New Panamax ships to reach container port facilities at Port Newark–Elizabeth Marine Terminal. Previously, only GCT Bayonne, Global Container, could handle the New Panamax ships.

As of April 2012, a controversy between Savannah, Georgia, and Charleston, South Carolina, over limited federal funding for dredging/deepening projects—including both state and federal lawsuits filed by environmental groups in both states opposing the techniques planned to be used in dredging the Savannah River—also revolves around attracting the business of carriers whose fleets include New Panamax vessels. Jacksonville, Florida, is pursuing its "Mile Point" project with the prospect of deepening the St. John's River in anticipation of Post-Panamax traffic; Mobile, Alabama, has completed the deepening of its harbor to 14 m (45 ft) for the same reason; and other ports seem likely to follow suit.

The American conservative think tanks The Heritage Foundation and Cato Institute have cited the Foreign Dredge Act of 1906 as a factor in constraining American dredging capacity for expanding ports to accommodate post-Panamax ships.

==== United Kingdom and Canada ====
Liverpool built a new container terminal, Liverpool2, where ships berth in the tidal river rather than in the enclosed docks, coinciding with the opening of the widened Panama Canal locks. In Halifax, Canada, a major expansion of the South End Container Terminal was completed in 2012, extending the pier and increasing the berth depth from 14.5 to 16 m (48 to 52 ft).

==== Mexico ====
The port of Salina Cruz, in the state of Oaxaca, Mexico, has been expanded to obtain the capacity to receive Post Panamax ships. This expansion forms part of the Interoceanic Corridor of the Isthmus of Tehuantepec (CIIT) project which the Mexican government has been executing since 2019. This expansion, which began in January 2022, consists of the creation of a new port with an access depth of 24 m (79 ft), a 1,600 m (5,200 ft) long breakwater and a 300 m (980 ft) wide mouth. This new port is planned to be inaugurated on February 26, 2024. Between January 2020 and June 30, 2023, the government spent over 3.8 billion Mexican pesos to this expansion. The project's goal is to create a land-based route alternative to the Panama Canal, which has faced complications in recent years due to intense droughts. However, the port of Coatzacoalcos, Veracruz, is still 12 m (39 ft) deep, but it has nonetheless been subjected to expansion and modernization to efficiently transport cargo.

=== Impact on existing ships ===
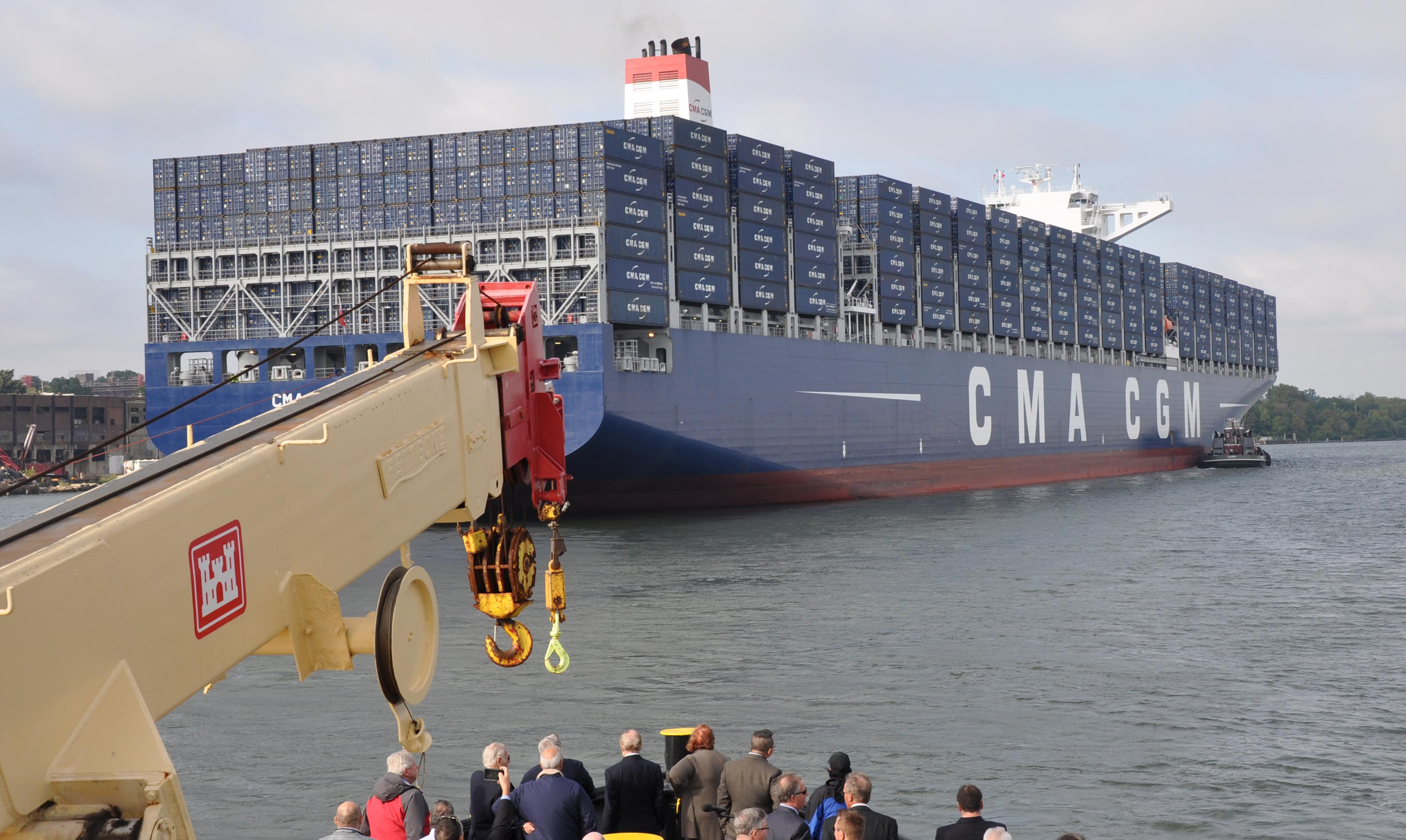
A New Panamax ship, the CMA CGM Theodore Roosevelt, about to transit New York Harbor via the heightened Bayonne Bridge

Due to the expansion, demand for Old Panamax ships has plummeted, resulting in ships being traded at scrap value. Some ships only seven years old have been sold for scrap, and others have been widened.

== Comparison of sizes ==
	Original locks	Panamax	Third locks (Note: New Panamax sizes are published in the metric system.)	New-Panamax
Length	320.04 m (1,050 ft)	294.13 m (965 ft)	427 m (1,400 ft)	366 m (1,200 ft)
Width	33.53 m (110 ft)	32.31 m (106 ft)	55 m (180 ft)	51.25 m (168.1 ft)
Draft (Note: Draft in tropical freshwater (TF))	12.56 m (41.2 ft)	12.04 m (39.5 ft)	18.3 m (60 ft)	15.2 m (50 ft)
TEUs		5,000		13,000
Tonnage		52,500 DWT		120,000 DWT

Comparison of the bounding box of Panamax and Neopanamax with some other sizes in isometric view

== Post-Panamax and Post-Neopanamax ships ==
Post-Panamax or over-Panamax denote ships larger than Panamax that do not fit in the original canal locks, such as supertankers and the largest modern container and passenger ships. The first post-Panamax ship was the RMS Queen Mary, launched in 1934, built with a 36 m (118 ft) beam as she was intended solely for North Atlantic passenger runs. When she was moved to Long Beach, California, as a tourist attraction in 1967, a lengthy voyage around Cape Horn was necessary. The first post-Panamax warships were the Japanese Yamato-class battleships, launched in 1940. Until World War II, the United States Navy required that all of their warships be capable of transiting the Panama Canal. The first US Navy warship design to exceed Panamax limits was the Montana-class battleship, designed circa 1940 but never built. The limit was specifically removed by the Secretary of the Navy on 12 February 1940, with the (never-realized) prospect of a new set of 43 m (140 ft) wide locks to be built for the Canal. The Essex-class aircraft carriers were designed with a folding deck-edge elevator to meet Panamax limits; the limit did not apply to subsequent US aircraft carriers.

== See also ==
- Cargo ship sizes: Handymax, Panamax, Suezmax, Capesize
- List of Panamax ports
- Malaccamax
- Q-Max
- Seawaymax
- Suezmax
