= The Oaks, Virginia =

Unincorporated community in Virginia, United States

Coordinates: 37°53′38″N 75°30′39″W

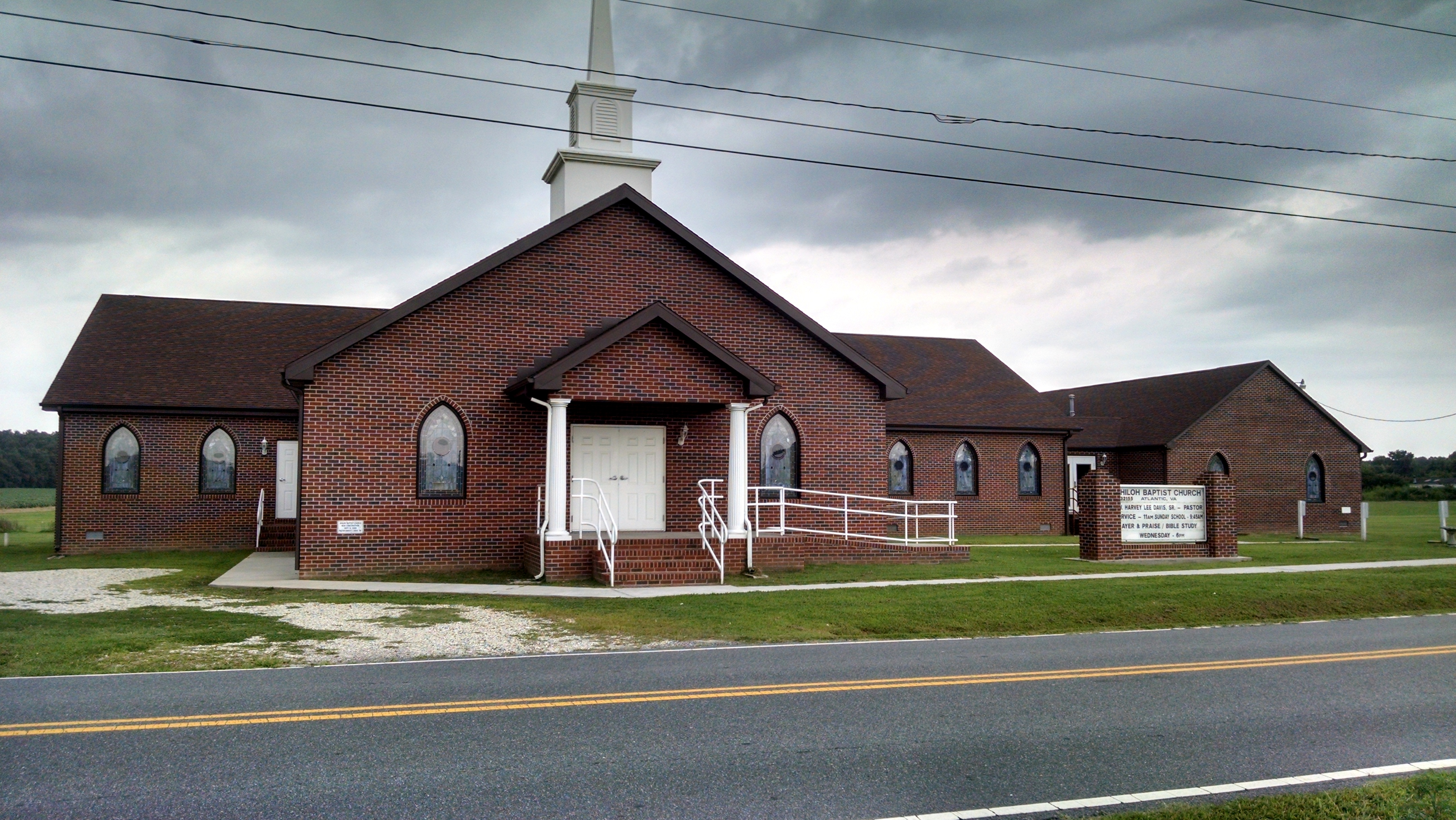
Shiloh Baptist Church in The Oaks, 2014

The Oaks is an unincorporated community in Accomack County, Virginia, United States. It is located on the outskirts of Atlantic.
