= Atlantic City (disambiguation) =

Atlantic City is a city in New Jersey, United States.

Atlantic City may also refer to:

== Places ==
- Eko Atlantic (Atlantic City Africa)
- Atlantic City, Wyoming, a census-designated place in Wyoming, United States
- "Atlantic-City", a business center in Primorsky District, Saint Petersburg
- Atlantic City, a radiocommunications and meteorological station on Jan Mayen operated by the United States Armed Forces from 1943 until 1949

== Transportation ==
- Atlantic City catboat, an American sailboat design
- Atlantic City Express (Amtrak train), a former Amtrak train service
- Atlantic City Express Service, a former train service linking New York City with Atlantic City
- Atlantic City Expressway, a toll road in South Jersey
- Atlantic City International Airport, an airport in Egg Harbor Township, New Jersey
- Atlantic City Line, a train service also in South Jersey
- Atlantic City Rail Terminal, a train station in Atlantic City, New Jersey

== Arts, entertainment, and media ==
- Atlantic City (1944 film), a musical film
- Atlantic City (1980 film), a drama film
- "Atlantic City", a 1986 episode of the TV series The Facts of Life
- "Atlantic City", a 2006 episode of the TV series How I Met Your Mother
- "Atlantic City" (Rules of Engagement), a 2010 television episode
- "Atlantic City" (song), a 1982 song by Bruce Springsteen

== Other uses ==
- Atlantic City (minor league baseball), two minor league baseball teams that represented Atlantic City, New Jersey
- Atlantic City Mercantile, an historic building in Atlantic City, Wyoming

== See also ==
- Atlantic County, New Jersey, USA
- Atlantic (disambiguation)
