= Atlantic Beach =

Atlantic Beach is the name of some places in the United States:

- Atlantic Beach, Florida, a city
- Atlantic Beach, New York, a village
- Atlantic Beach, North Carolina, a town
- Atlantic Beach, South Carolina, a town

== See also ==
- Atlantic (disambiguation)
