= Atlantic Bridge =

Atlantic Bridge may refer to:

- Atlantic Bridge, Panama, the third bridge across the Panama Canal
- Atlantic Bridge (flight route), between Newfoundland and Scotland
- Atlantic Bridge (album), by Davy Spillane
- The Atlantic Bridge, a former organization promoting UK–US cooperation
- Atlantik-Brücke (Atlantic Bridge), an organization promoting German–US cooperation
- Atlantic Bridge or Bridge over the Atlantic, a nickname applied especially to Clachan Bridge in Scotland

== See also ==
- Atlantic Beach Bridge, New York, USA
- Atlantic Ocean Tunnel, a road tunnel southwest of Kristiansund, Norway
- Transatlantic (disambiguation)
