= Foreign Dredge Act of 1906 =

United States federal statute

- Long title: An Act Concerning foreign-built dredges.
- Enacted by: the 59th United States Congress
- Effective: May 28, 1906

Citations
- Public law: Pub. L. 59–185
- Statutes at Large: 34 Stat. 204

Legislative history
- Introduced in the House as H.R. 395 by Charles H. Grosvenor (R‑OH) on December 4, 1905; Committee consideration by Merchant Marine and Fisheries; Passed the House on February 23, 1906 (unanimous); Passed the Senate on April 28, 1906 (unanimous); Reported by the joint conference committee on May 11, 1906; agreed to by the Senate on May 11, 1906 (unanimous) and by the House on May 17, 1906 (unanimous); Signed into law by President Theodore Roosevelt on May 28, 1906

The Foreign Dredge Act of 1906 is a United States federal statute that requires dredges operating in US waters to be built in the United States and to be owned and chartered by US citizens. Dredges violating the act are subject to seizure by and forfeiture to the US government.

== Origin ==
The original intention of the law was to protect and foster America's shipbuilding industry to enable it to compete with established foreign shipbuilders. A dredging project to repair the town of Galveston, Texas, after the 1900 Galveston hurricane raised concerns that sand exported on foreign-owned barges might be taken out of the country, which would effectively steal US soil. That provided the initial motivation for the bill that would become the Foreign Dredge Act. A more central motivation emerged: protecting the US shipbuilding industry from foreign competition.

== Current impact and criticism ==
Two countries, the United States and China, prohibit foreign dredging, and 15% of countries surveyed by the Transportation Institute have restrictions on dredging. The US Army Corps of Engineers and Government Accountability Office state that lack of dredging capacity and high costs are the cause of a 15-year delay in dredging the 10 most important US ports to accommodate post-Panamax depths. The Heritage Foundation and the Cato Institute claim that the Foreign Dredge Act is anti-competitive and that it impairs America's ability to expand its ports by limiting its supply of dredging ships. Gregory Tosi argues that for example, the Port of Corpus Christi loses $50 billion of oil exports per year because of a lack of dredging capacity to improve the port.

90% of global dredging contracts are currently won by one of the Belgian and Dutch dredging companies Jan De Nul, Van Oord, Boskalis, and DEME. The four companies are generally ineligible to compete for US contracts.

== Proposed legislative changes ==
Senator Mike Lee has proposed the DEEP Act, which would repeal the Foreign Dredge Act and create a new nationwide permitting process to expedite dredging permits. He has also introduced more constrained versions of the bill, the Port Modernization and Supply Chain Protection Act, which would repeal the Foreign Dredge Act's cabotage requirements and allow international dredges to operate in the US.

The SHIP IT Act, introduced by Congresswoman Michelle Fischbach and Congressman Byron Donalds, would allow vessels from NATO member countries to engage in dredging in the United States. The Cato Institute noted, "Four of the largest dredging companies in the world are located in NATO members, with each possessing more hopper dredgers than the entire U.S. dredging fleet combined." Lee has introduced a bill with similar purposes in the Senate, the Allied Partnership and Port Modernization Act.
