= Atlantic (ship) =

Many vessels have been named Atlantic:

- Atlantic (1783) was launched in 1783. She made one voyage from England to Australia in 1791 carrying convicts. Later, she made one voyage for the East India Company (EIC). Subsequently she sailed to Smyrna, Surinam, and Gibraltar, before she disappeared from records in 1810.
- Atlantic (1805 ship) was launched at Calcutta, under another name and returned to British ownership as a prize taken from the French in 1805. She made one complete voyage for Samuel Enderby & Sons as a whaler in the British southern whale fishery. She was lost late in 1807 perhaps while setting out on a second whaling voyage.
- Atlantic (1810 ship) was a French prize that the British whaling firm of Samuel Enderby and Sons purchased and used as a whaler under the name Atlantic. In 1813, on her second whaling voyage, the frigate USS Essex captured her off the Galapagos Islands. The Americans named her Essex Junior. The British recaptured her on 28 March 1814 when they captured Essex. They then sent Essex Junior to New York as a cartel. There the Americans seized her and sold her.
- Atlantic (1848), steamboat that sank on 20 August 1852 on Lake Erie after a collision with the steamer Ogdensburg
- SS Atlantic – any one of several vessels by that, or related names.
- U.S.T. Atlantic, a supertanker of the U.S.T. Atlantic-class launched in 1979.
