= List of bridges in Panama =

== Historical bridges ==
	Name	Distinction	Length	Type	Carries Crosses	Opened	Location	Province	Ref.
1	Puente del Matadero, Panama	Historic monument ID 08-097-DCMHN		Masonry	Quebrada Santa Elena	1607	Panama City; 9°00′12.6″N 79°29′40.6″W	Panamá Province	
2	Puente del Rey, Panama	Historic monument ID 08-098-DCMHN		Masonry; 1 arch	Abajo River	1634	Panama City; 9°00′47.9″N 79°29′09.0″W	Panamá Province	
3	Portobello Colonial Bridge	Historic monument ID 03-054-DCMH		Masonry; 1 arch		17th century	Portobelo	Colón Province	

== Major bridges ==
	Name	Span	Length	Type	Carries Crosses	Opened	Location	Province	Ref.
1	Atlantic Bridge	530 m (1,740 ft)	2,820 m (9,250 ft)	Cable-stayed; Concrete box girder deck, concrete pylons 230+530+230	Panama Canal; Bahía Limón	2019	Colón; 9°18′27.4″N 79°55′06.9″W	Colón Province	
2	Fourth Panama Canal Bridge under construction	485 m (1,591 ft)	2,100 m (6,900 ft)	Cable-stayed; Concrete pylons	Line 3 (Panama Metro); Panama Canal	2028	Balboa, Panama City; 8°56′49.4″N 79°34′10.3″W	Panamá; Panamá Oeste	
3	Centennial Bridge	420 m (1,380 ft)	1,052 m (3,451 ft)	Cable-stayed; Concrete box girder deck, concrete pylons 200+420+200	Pan-American Highway; Panama Canal	2004	Paraíso - Burunga; 9°18′27.4″N 79°55′06.9″W	Panamá; Panamá Oeste	
4	Bridge of the Americas	344 m (1,129 ft)	1,655 m (5,430 ft)	Arch; Steel through arch	Carretera Panama-Arraijan; Panama Canal	1962	Balboa, Panama City; 8°56′35.6″N 79°33′53.1″W	Panamá; Panamá Oeste	
5	Rio Chiriquí Suspension Bridge	122 m (400 ft)	200 m (660 ft)	Suspension; Steel pylons	Chiriquí River	1937	David	Chiriquí Province	
6	Corredor Sur Viaduct		2,700 m (8,900 ft)	Beam; Prestressed concrete	Pan-American Highway; Corredor Sur; Gulf of Panama (Pacific Ocean)		Panama City; 8°59′57.6″N 79°29′21.7″W	Panamá Province	
7	Viaducto Marino		2,400 m (7,900 ft)	Beam; Prestressed concrete	Cinta Costera; Gulf of Panama (Pacific Ocean)	1998	Panama City; 8°56′58.0″N 79°31′39.0″W	Panamá Province	
8	Bayano Bridge			Cantilever; Steel	Pan-American Highway; Bayano Lake		Babita de Perro; 9°10′15.5″N 78°47′45.0″W	Panamá Province	

== See also ==
- Transport in Panama
