= Atlantique =

Atlantique may refer to:

- Atlantic Ocean (French: Océan Atlantique)
- Atlantique (film), a 2019 film
- Atlantique Department in Benin
- SNCF's TGV Atlantique class of high-speed trains
- The Breguet Atlantique airplane
- Chantiers de l'Atlantique, Saint-Nazaire-based shipyard
- The Venturi Automobiles' Atlantique sports car
- The SS L'Atlantique was an ocean liner which was a total loss after catching fire at sea
- Atlantic Europe (French: Arc atlantique)
- Atlantic Canada (French: Canada atlantique)

== See also ==
- Atlantik (disambiguation)
- Atlantic (disambiguation)
