= Atlantik =

Atlantik may refer to:

- Atlantik (band), a soca-music band based in Trinidad and Tobago
- Hamburg Atlantic Line (Hamburg Atlantik Linie), a shipping company later known as Deutsche Atlantik Linie
- Atlantik (film), a 1929 British-made German language drama film

== See also ==
- Atlantic (disambiguation)
- Atlantique (disambiguation)
