= Transatlantic =

Transatlantic, Trans-Atlantic or TransAtlantic may refer to:

== Film and television ==
- Transatlantic Pictures, a film production company from 1948 to 1950
- Transatlantic Enterprises, an American production company in the late 1970s
- Transatlantic (1931 film), an American comedy starring Edmund Lowe
- Transatlantic (1960 film), a British film
- Transatlantic (1998 film), a Croatian film by Mladen Juran
- Transatlantic (TV series), a 2023 Netflix series.

== Literature ==
- Trans-Atlantyk a 1953 novel by Witold Gombrowicz
- TransAtlantic (novel), a 2013 book by Colum McCann

== Music ==
- Transatlantic Records, an independent record label active in the UK in the 1960s and 1970s
- Transatlantic (band), a multinational progressive rock supergroup
- The Transatlantics, an Australian funk and soul band
- Transatlantic (opera), a 1928 opera by George Antheil
- Transatlantic (album), a 2011 album by Chris Potter

== Transport ==
- Transatlantic crossing, by sea
  - Transatlantic flight
  - Transatlantic slave trade
- TransAtlantic Lines, an American shipping company
  - MV TransAtlantic, a container ship owned and operated by TransAtlantic Lines
- Mersey (1894 ship) or Transatlantic

== See also ==
- Atlantic Bridge (disambiguation)
- Bridge over the Atlantic
- Ocean current
- Transatlantic accent
- Transatlantic communications cable
- Transatlantic Economic Council
- Transatlantic relations
- Transatlantico, part of the Palazzo Montecitorio in Rome
