= Atlantic Building =

Coordinates: 23°8′34.11″N 82°23′56.73″W

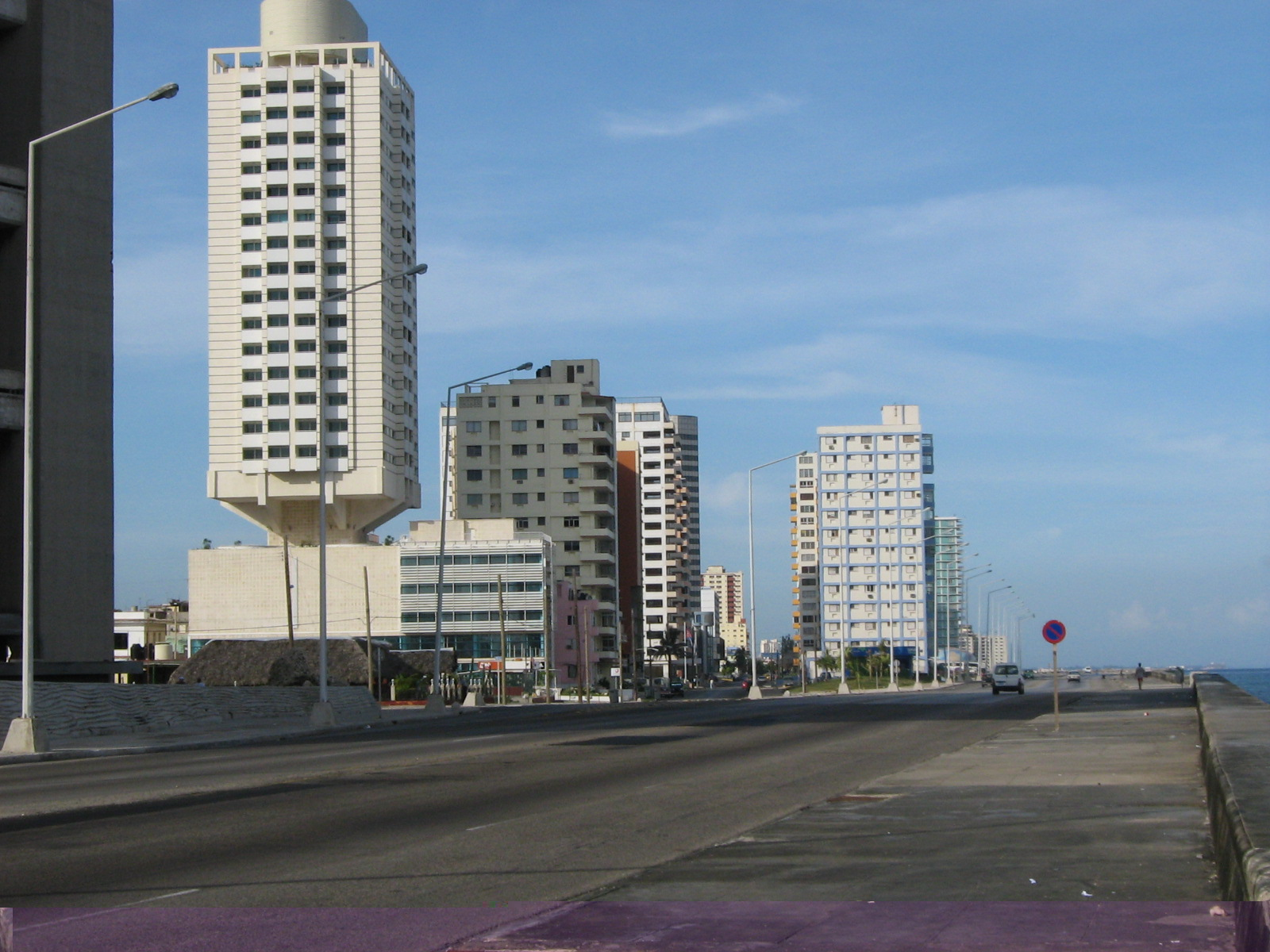
The Atlantic Building in the foreground, in the Malecon area.

The Atlantic Building (Edificio Atlantic) is a condominium building of 25 floors located on Calle D between 1st. and 3rd, in Vedado, Havana. It is located in a privileged area near the Malecon. It the first building erected by the Cuban-Italian mixed enterprise Azul Inmobiliaria, founded in 1999 in partnership with the Italian partner B & D International and is a holding company with franchised in Cuba where it is known as Inversiones Punta del Morro. Construction began in 2000 and was inaugurated on February 10, 2007. It is considered a symbol of Cuban modern architecture.

== Structure ==
It consists of the lobby on the ground floor along with an office, 5 floors of parking, a terrace and pool on the sixth floor. The 96 apartments are spread across 15 levels from the eighth floor at the rate of 6 per floor. At level 23 there are several pools and technical facilities in 24 and 25. Also part of the whole a side building of 5 floors, with three shopping centers and six dwellings.

=== Materials ===
The project used cantilevered beams of post-tensioned concrete and rebar with a high yield strength (up to 600 MPa) and strands with high yield strengths of 1900 MPa. The materials have undergone in-depth studies because the building is located in an area near the sea and likely to receive high winds and storm surges when the city is hit by a hurricane.

=== Design ===
The architecture was designed by a team of Italian experts of the MSC firm, while the structural design for the different facilities was developed by the Cuban company DCH (Diseño Ciudad Habana).

=== Facilities ===
With views of the Straits of Florida and the city, its guestroom services include: HVAC, lighting, fax, phone, TV cable, video intercom, fast elevators, internal security, intrusion systems, emergency. Complemented with hire facilities (Havanautos), package delivery as CUBAPACK or DHL.
