= Atlantic Bridge, Panama =

Atlantic Bridge
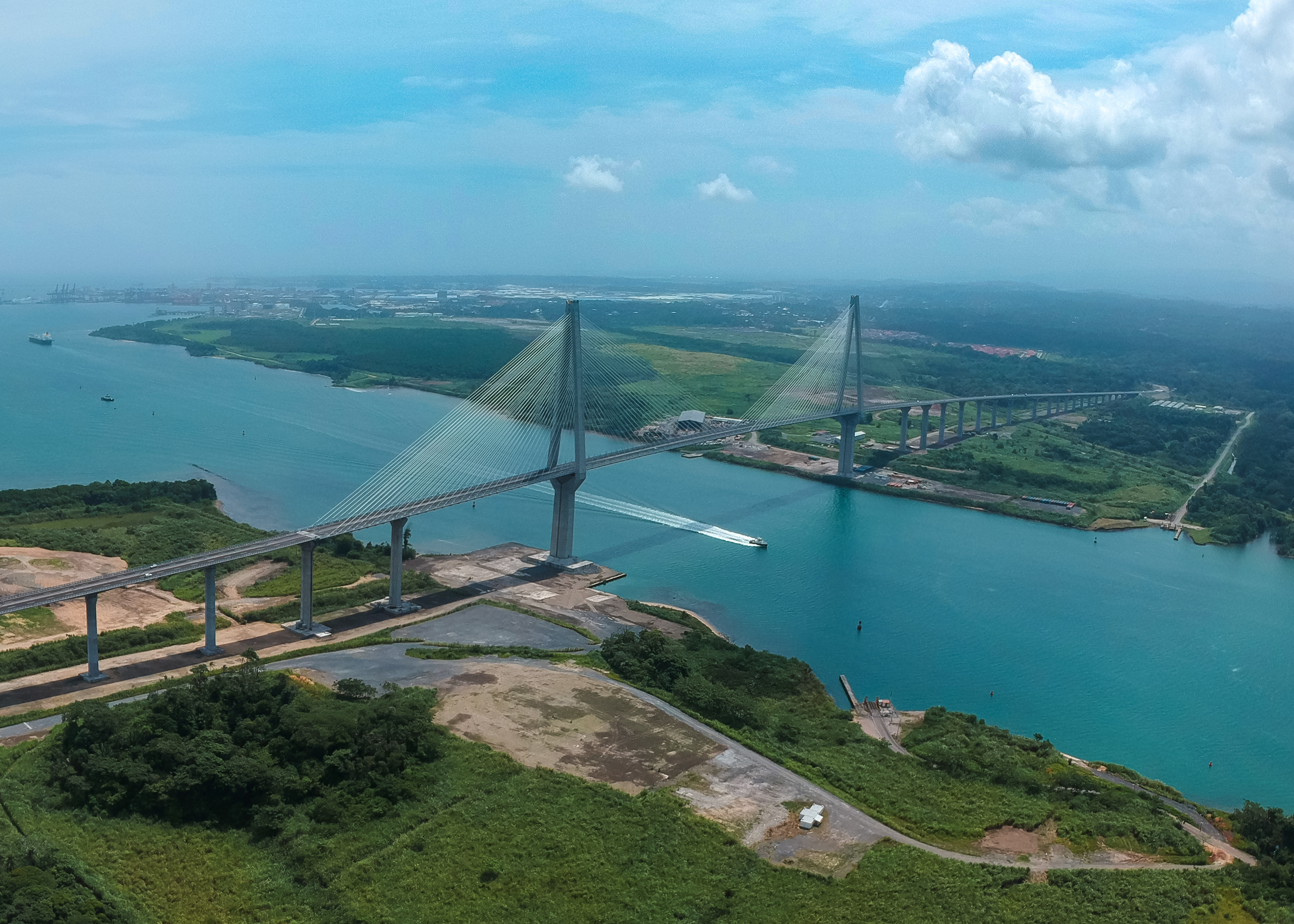
- The bridge in August 2019
- Coordinates: 9°18′29″N 79°55′08″W
- Carries: Four lanes of traffic, pedestrians and bicycles
- Crosses: Atlantic entrance to the Panama Canal
- Locale: Colón, Panama
- Official name: Puente Atlántico
- Owner: Panama Canal Authority

Characteristics
- Design: double-pylon, double-plane cable-stayed bridge
- Material: Prestressed concrete
- Total length: 2,877 m (9,439 ft)
- Height: 204.5 m (671 ft)
- Longest span: 530 m (1,740 ft)
- No. of spans: 79+181+530+181+79 m
- Piers in water: 1
- Clearance below: 75 m (246 ft)

History
- Designer: HPDI and Louis Berger Group
- Constructed by: Vinci Construction Grands Projets
- Construction start: January 2013
- Construction end: August 2019

Location
- Interactive map of Atlantic Bridge

The Atlantic Bridge (Spanish: Puente Atlántico) is a road bridge in Colón, Panama spanning the Atlantic entrance to the Panama Canal. Completed in 2019, it is the third bridge over the canal after the Bridge of the Americas and the Centennial Bridge, both on the Pacific side of the canal.

The bridge is a double-pylon, double-plane, concrete girder, cable-stayed bridge with a main span of 530 metres (1,740 ft) and two side spans of 230 metres (750 ft). The east and west approaches are 1,074 metres (3,524 ft) and 756 metres (2,480 ft) long, respectively. The bridge was designed by the CCCC-LBG Consortium composed of HPDI and The Louis Berger Group’s Panama branch and built by Vinci Construction.

== Route ==
The bridge is part of a local connection road (as yet unnamed) between Bolivar Highway in the east and the undeveloped western area. It will replace the nearby Panama Canal Ferry. It is the only bridge north of the Culebra Cut (Puente Centenario).

== Construction ==
Three consortiums were approved to bid for the bridge construction: Acciona Infraestructuras -Tradeco (Spain and Mexico), Odebrecht–Hyundai Joint Venture (Brazil and Korea), and Vinci Construction Grands Projets (France). Tenders were received in August 2012.

In October 2012, the Panama Canal Authority awarded a contract to the French company Vinci Construction to build a third (permanent) bridge, near the Atlantic side, for an offer price of US$366 million. At that time the bridge had no name, but Third bridge and Atlantic side bridge were used, as well as Atlantic Bridge.

Construction of the bridge and access viaducts, which commenced in January 2013, was planned to take three and a half years and was expected to be completed in 2016. The main span of the bridge was keyed (joined into a single span) on 6 September 2018. The bridge was unveiled by Panama President Laurentino Cortizo and Panama Canal Administrator Jorge Quijano on Friday 2 August 2019.

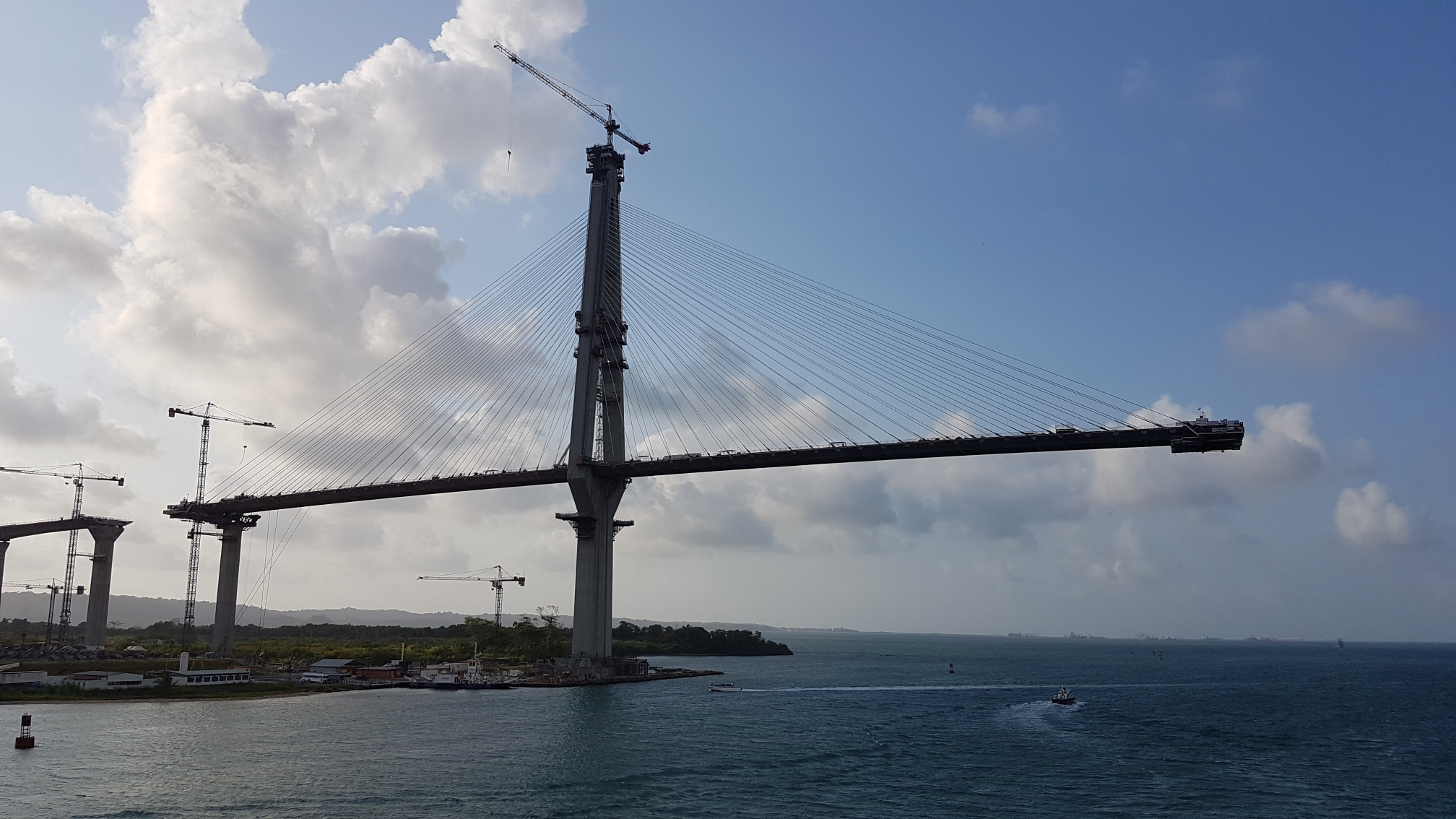
Western side of Atlantic Bridge during construction (19 March 2018)

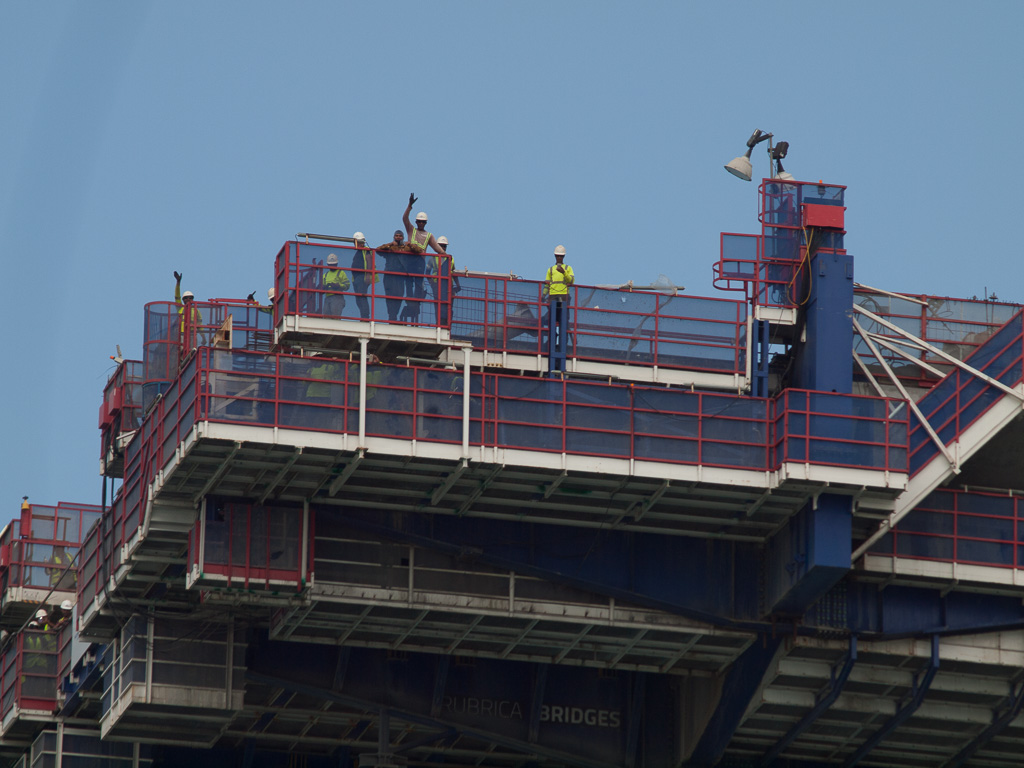
Construction workers on Atlantic Bridge (1 February 2018)

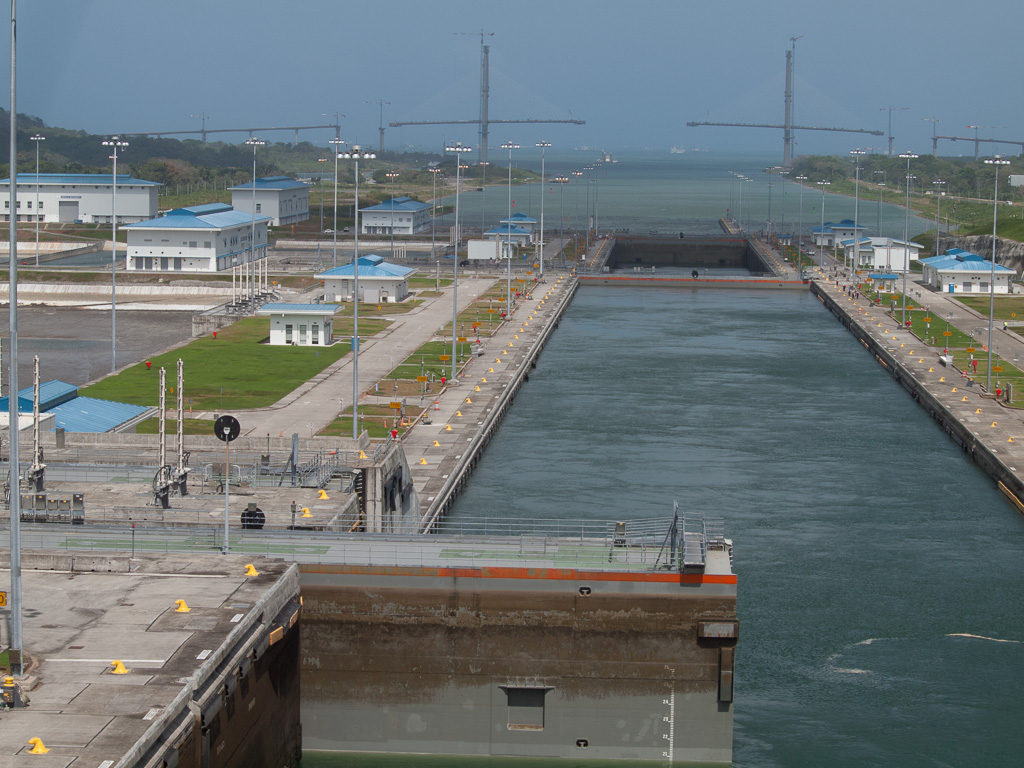
Atlantic Bridge during construction (1 February 2018)

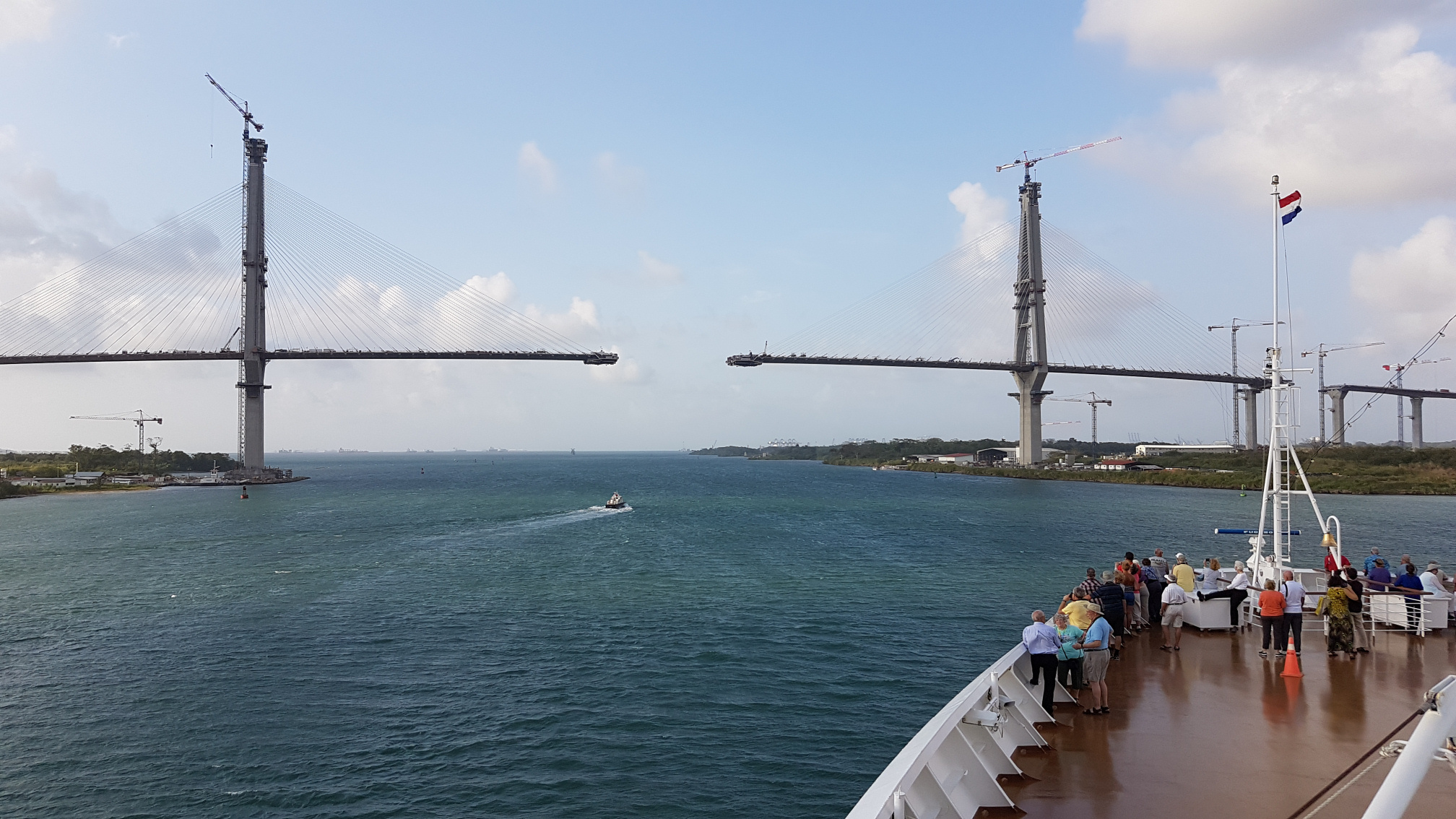
Atlantic Bridge during construction (19 March 2018)

== See also ==
- List of bridges in Panama
- List of tallest bridges
