= Atlantic (1921 automobile) =

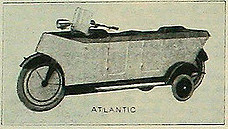

The Atlantic was made by Atlantic AG für Automobilbau, Berlin (Prussia), from 1921 to 1923. It was a single-track car with two auxiliary side wheels and a two-seat tandem body. An air-cooled 2-cylinder 1.8/6.5PS engine was used.
