= Atlantic City catboat =

Sailboat class

Development
- Designer: D. Martin
- Location: United States
- Year: 1980
- Builder: Mark-O Custom Boats
- Role: Cruiser
- Name: Atlantic City catboat

Boat
- Displacement: 8,000 lb (3,629 kg)
- Draft: 5.00 ft (1.52 m) with centerboard down

Hull
- Type: monohull
- Construction: fiberglass
- LOA: 24.00 ft (7.32 m)
- LWL: 22.00 ft (6.71 m)
- Beam: 11.00 ft (3.35 m)
- Engine: BMW 12 hp (9 kW) diesel engine

Hull appendages
- Keel: centerboard
- Ballast: 2,200 lb (998 kg)
- Rudder: transom-mounted rudder

Rig
- Rig type: Gaff rig

Sails
- Sailplan: Catboat
- Mainsail area: 452.00 sq ft (41.992 m^{2})
- Total sail area: 452.00 sq ft (41.992 m^{2})

The Atlantic City catboat is an American sailboat that was designed by D. Martin as a cruiser and first built in 1980.

The design can be confused with the unrelated 1913 Atlantic City Catboat Class.

== Production ==
The design was built by Mark-O Custom Boats in the United States, starting in 1980, but it is now out of production.

== Design ==
The Atlantic City is a recreational sailboat, built predominantly of solid laminate fabmat (stitched fiberglass fabric), with wood trim. It is a gaff rigged catboat with aluminum spars. The hull has a plumb stem, an angled transom, a shallow-draft, transom-hung rudder controlled by a tiller or optional wheel and a retractable weighted centerboard. It displaces 8,000 lb (3,629 kg) and carries 2,200 lb (998 kg) of ballast.

The boat has a draft of 5.00 ft (1.52 m) with the centerboard extended and 2.00 ft (0.61 m) with it retracted.

The boat is fitted with a German BMW diesel engine of 12 hp (9 kW) for docking and maneuvering. The fresh water tank has a capacity of 25 U.S. gallons (95 L; 21 imp gal).

The design has sleeping accommodation for six people, consisting of a convertible aft dinette area double berth and two forward cabin settees with pilot berths above them. It has an optional galley on the port side just forward of the companionway ladder. The galley is L-shaped and is equipped with a two-burner stove. A navigation station and a fireplace were also factory options. The head is located in the forepeak. The cabin has 6.17 ft (1.88 m) of headroom.

For sailing the design is equipped with mainsail hoops in place of more conventional cars.

In a 1994 review Richard Sherwood described the design as a classic catboat.

In a 2010 review Steve Henkel wrote, "if you've ever heard the sailor's description of a cozy cruiser, 'drinks six, eats four, sleeps two,' you'll appreciate that this boat is different: she drinks eight (if squeezed into the cockpit at anchor), eats four (at a dinette below, unless you go for trays on laps), and sleeps six (double berth under the starboard cockpit, upper and lower berths to starboard forward, and a dinette that converts to another double). We can’t imagine who would want to sleep six in what amounts to a large walk-in closet, unless it’s a family with four small kids. Best features: For the large, close-knit family that is totally committed to catboats, this might be a good choice ... Worst features: Her sail area of 452 square feet, all in one big piece of cloth, can be hard to manage. Her centerboard shape, with its cutout forward to avoid cluttering up the cabin with a centerboard trunk, could be a problem too."
