= U.S.T. Atlantic-class supertanker =

Class overview
- Name: U.S.T. Atlantic class
- Builders: Newport News Shipbuilding
- Operators: Interocean Management Inc.
- Built: 1978–1979
- In service: 1979–present
- Planned: 3
- Completed: 2
- Canceled: 1
- Active: 1
- Scrapped: 1

General characteristics
- Type: ULCC MA design--T11-S-116a
- Tonnage: 189,417 GT; 171,126 NT; 404,531 DWT
- Displacement: 60,160 long tons (61,130 t), light; 464,691 long tons (472,148 t), full load
- Length: LOA: 362.14 m (1,188 ft 1 in); Cidade de Macae 420 m (1,377 ft 11 in); LBP: 348.40 m (1,143 ft 1 in)
- Beam: 69.49 m (228 ft 0 in)
- Draught: 22.810 m (74 ft 10.0 in)
- Depth: 28.96 m (95 ft 0 in)
- Propulsion: General Electric steam turbine; 44,400 shp (33,100 kW)
- Speed: 15.5 kn (28.7 km/h; 17.8 mph)

The U.S.T. Atlantic class is a class of Ultra Large Crude Carriers (ULCC) comprising two ships, U.S.T. Atlantic and U.S.T. Pacific. A third vessel in the class was canceled before construction began. They were the largest ships ever built in the Western Hemisphere. Built by Newport News Shipbuilding, the only American shipbuilders with the facilities for ULCC construction, the two ships were constructed in 1978–1979. At full load, the ships drew nearly 75 feet (22.86 m) and were unable to visit any ports in the continental United States, unless lightered or light ship.

== Ships in class ==
U.S.T. Atlantic class construction data
Name	Builder	Launched	Status
U.S.T. Atlantic	Newport News Shipbuilding, Newport News, Virginia	October 1978	Sold and renamed Marine Atlantic in 1994. Scrapped at Chittagong beginning June 4, 2004.
U.S.T. Pacific	Newport News Shipbuilding, Newport News, Virginia	August 1979	Sold and renamed Marine Pacific I in 1994. Sold and converted to a floating storage and offloading vessel in 2004. Renamed Cidade de Macae.

== History ==
Two tankers were ordered by the U.S. Trust Company of New York. Named U.S.T. Atlantic and U.S.T. Pacific, they were built in 1978–1979 at Newport News Shipbuilding's shipyard in Newport News, Virginia with the yard numbers 613 and 614 respectively. Each vessel cost approximately US$136.4 million. A third vessel of the class ordered by Zapata Ocean Carriers was canceled. U.S.T. Atlantic was delivered in March 1979 and U.S.T. Pacific in December 1979. The two vessels were sold to Marine Atlantic Ltd - LI in 1994 and renamed Marine Atlantic and Marine Pacific I respectively.

In June 2004, Marine Atlantic—ex U.S.T. Atlantic—was sold to Indian shipbreakers. After clearing Indian customs, she was intentionally beached in India for ship breaking.

In 2007, Marine Pacific I was extensively rebuilt as a floating storage and offloading vessel for the Campos Basin and renamed Cidade de Macae.

== See also ==
- List of world's longest ships
