= Atlantic (cinema) =

Cinema in Warsaw, Poland

Coordinates: 52°13′54″N 21°00′45″E

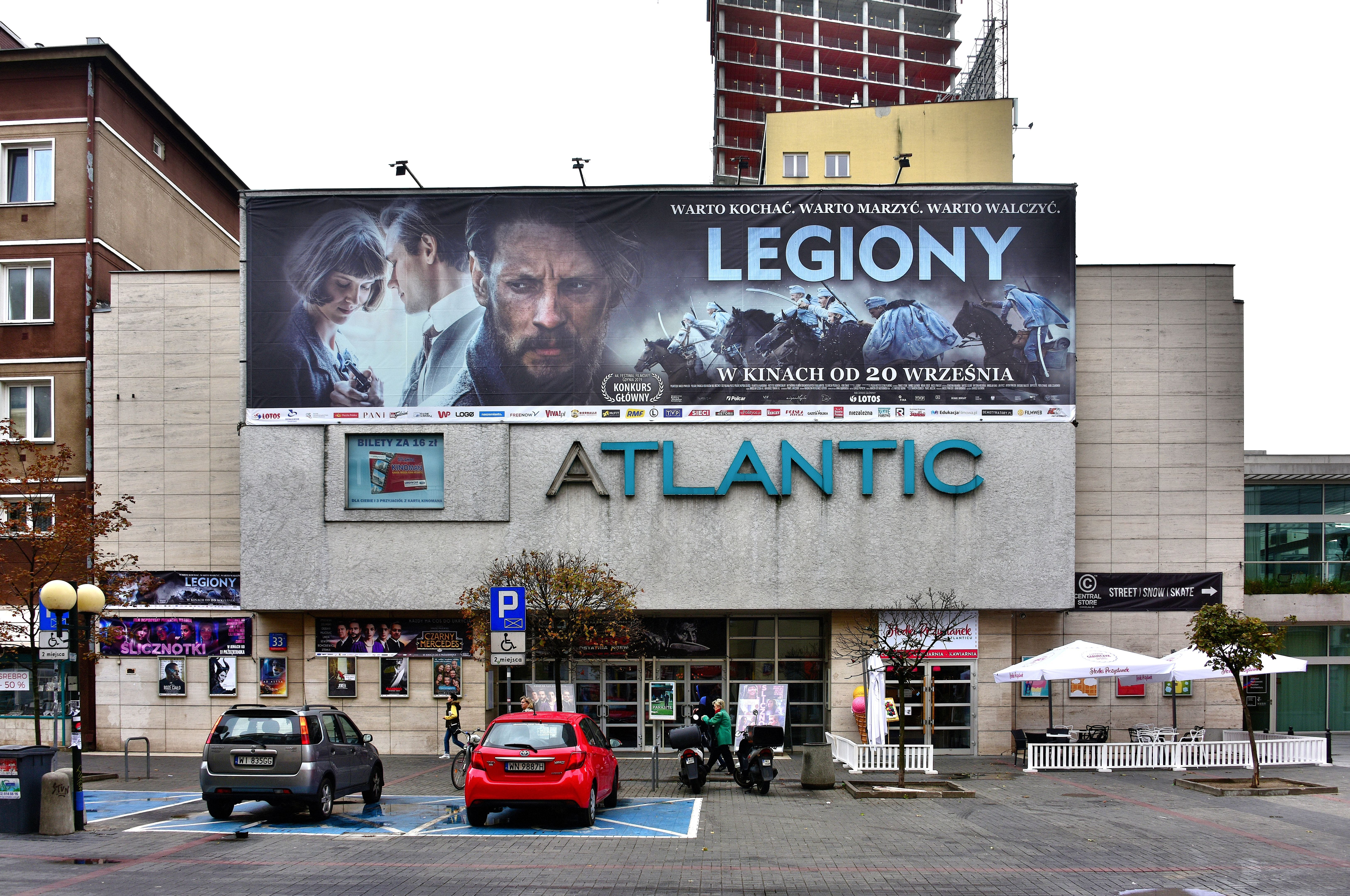
Atlantic Cinema

The Atlantic is a Polish cinema in Warsaw, notable as the oldest cinema still operating in that city.

== History and description ==
It was opened to the public in 1930 as a luxurious cinema with expensive tickets. As the only cinema in Warsaw, it survived the 1944 Warsaw Uprising of World War II and was refurbished after the war. In early 2000, it was reconstructed and houses four screens and 794 seats.
