= Bridge of the Americas =

Road bridge in Panama spanning the Pacific entrance to the Panama Canal

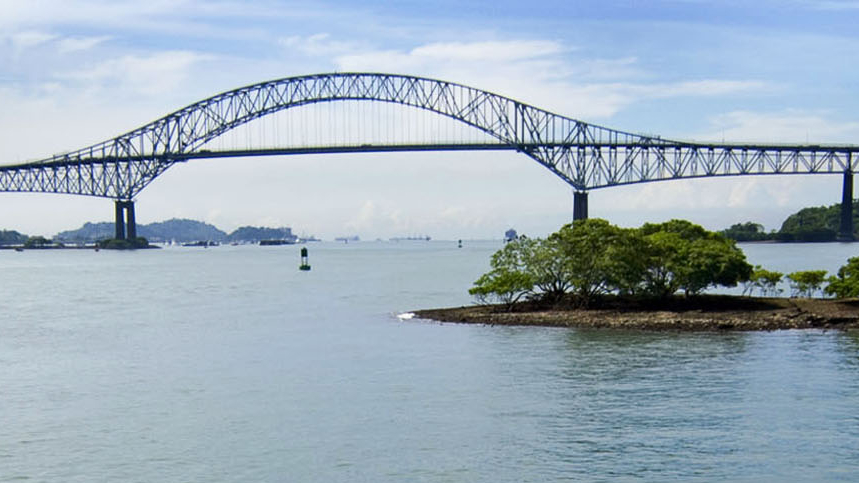
- Coordinates: 8°56′35″N 79°33′54″W
- Carries: Four lanes of Carretera Panama-Arraijan, pedestrians and bicycles
- Crosses: Pacific entrance of the Panama Canal
- Locale: Balboa, Panama
- Official name: Puente de las Américas

Characteristics
- Design: Steel through arch bridge John F. Beasly & Company
- Total length: 1,654 m (5,425 ft)
- Width: 10.4 m (34 ft)
- Longest span: 344 m (1,128 ft)
- Clearance below: 61.3 m (201 ft) at high tide

History
- Opened: October 12, 1962

Statistics
- Daily traffic: 35,000 (2004)

Location
- Interactive map of Bridge of the Americas

The Bridge of the Americas (Spanish: Puente de las Américas; originally known as the Thatcher Ferry Bridge) is a road bridge in Panama which spans the Pacific entrance to the Panama Canal. Designed by American civil engineering company Sverdrup & Parcel, it was completed in 1962 at a cost of US$20 million. Two other bridges cross the canal: the Atlantic Bridge at the Gatun locks and the Centennial Bridge.

== Description ==
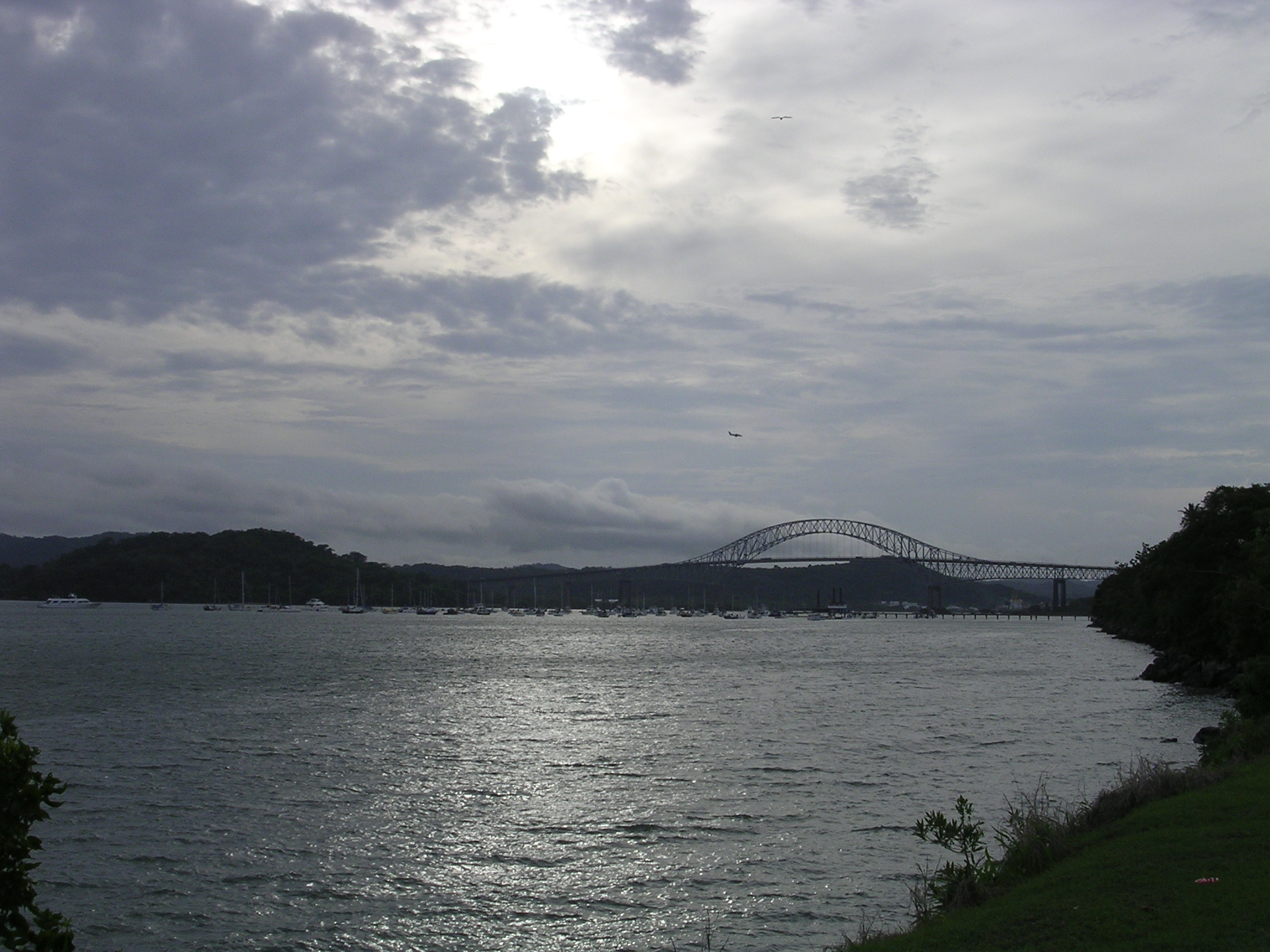
Bridge of the Americas

The Bridge of the Americas crosses the Pacific approach to the Panama Canal at Balboa, near Panama City. It was built between 1959 and 1962 by the United States at a cost of US$20 million. From its completion in 1962 until the opening of the parallel Centennial Bridge in 2004, the Bridge of the Americas was a key part of the Pan-American Highway. The Bridge of the Americas greatly increases road traffic capacity across the Canal. Two earlier bridges cross the Canal, but they use moveable designs and have limited traffic capacity. These earlier spans include a small swinging road bridge, built into the lock structure at Gatún, and a swinging road/rail bridge constructed in 1942 at Miraflores. The Centennial Bridge was constructed in an effort to eliminate the bottleneck of, and reduce traffic congestion on, the Bridge of the Americas.

The bridge is a cantilever design where the suspended span is a tied arch. The bridge has a total length of 1,654 m (5,425 ft) in 14 spans, abutment to abutment. The main span measures 344 m (1,129 ft) and the tied arch (the center part of the main span) is 259 m (850 ft). The highest point of the bridge is 117 m (384 ft) above mean sea level; the clearance under the main span is 61.3 m (201 ft) at high tide. Ships must cross under this bridge when traversing the Panama Canal, and are subject to this height restriction. The world's largest cruise ships, Oasis of the Seas, Allure of the Seas, Harmony of the Seas and the Symphony of the Seas will fit within the canal's widened locks, but they are too tall to pass under the Bridge of the Americas, even at low tide, unless the Bridge of the Americas is either raised or replaced in the future. (The Centennial Bridge is also a fixed obstacle, but its clearance is much higher: 80.0 m (262 ft).)

The bridge has wide access ramps at each end, and pedestrian walkways on each side.

== History ==
=== The need for a bridge ===
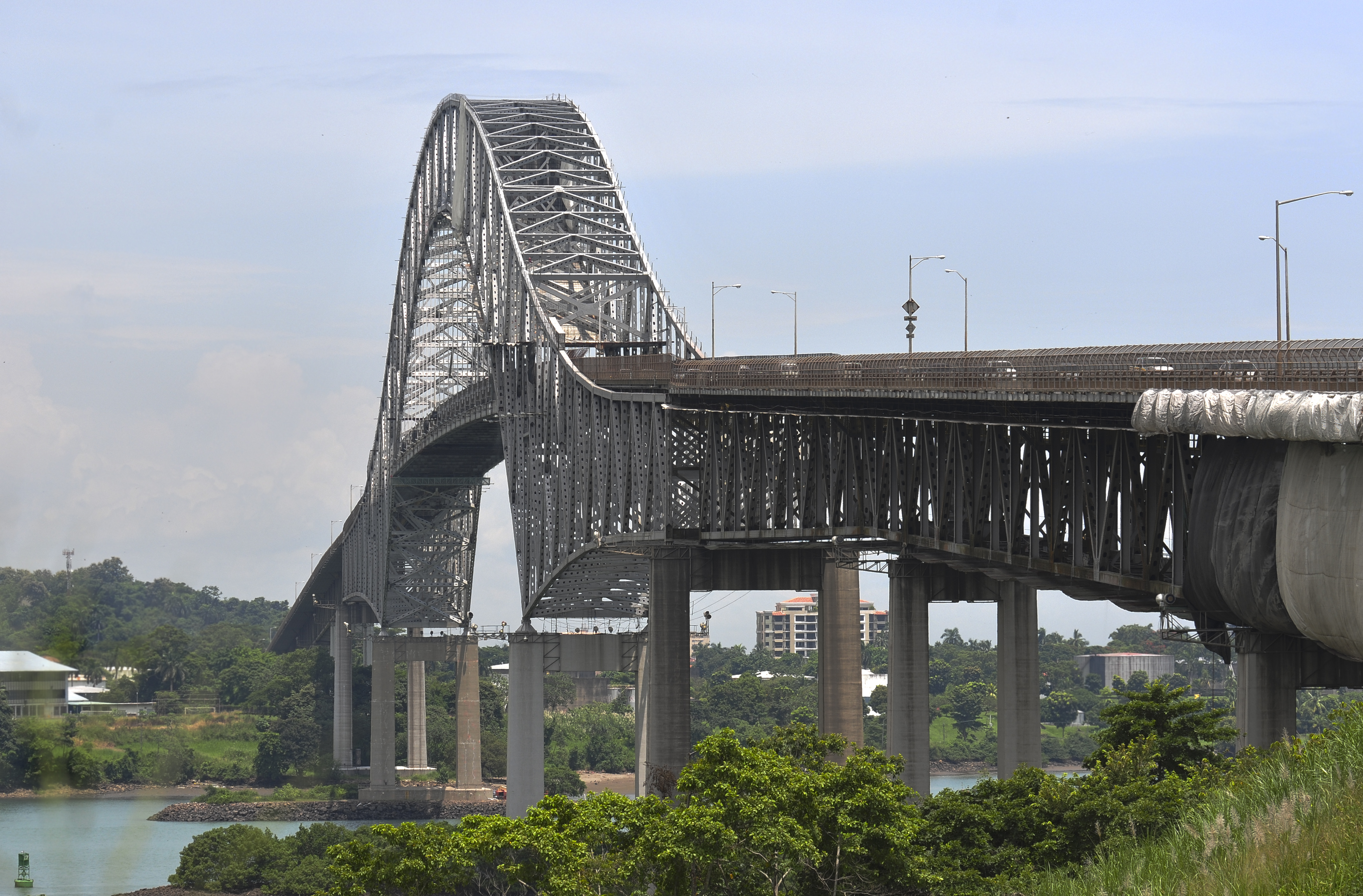
Puente de Las Americas, Panama

From the beginning of the French project to construct a canal, it was recognized that the cities of Colón and Panamá would be split from the rest of the republic by the new canal. This was an issue even during construction, when barges were used to ferry construction workers across the canal.

After the canal opened, the increasing number of cars, and the construction of a new road leading to Chiriquí, in the west of Panama, increased the need for some kind of crossing. The Panama Canal Mechanical Division addressed this in August 1931, with the commissioning of two new ferries, the Presidente Amador and President Washington. This service was expanded in August 1940, with additional barges mainly serving the military.

On June 3, 1942, a road/rail swing bridge was inaugurated at the Miraflores locks; although only usable when no ships were passing, this provided some relief for traffic wishing to cross the canal. Still, it was clear that a more substantial solution would be required. To meet the growing needs of vehicle traffic, another ferry, the Presidente Porras, was added in November 1942.

=== The bridge project ===
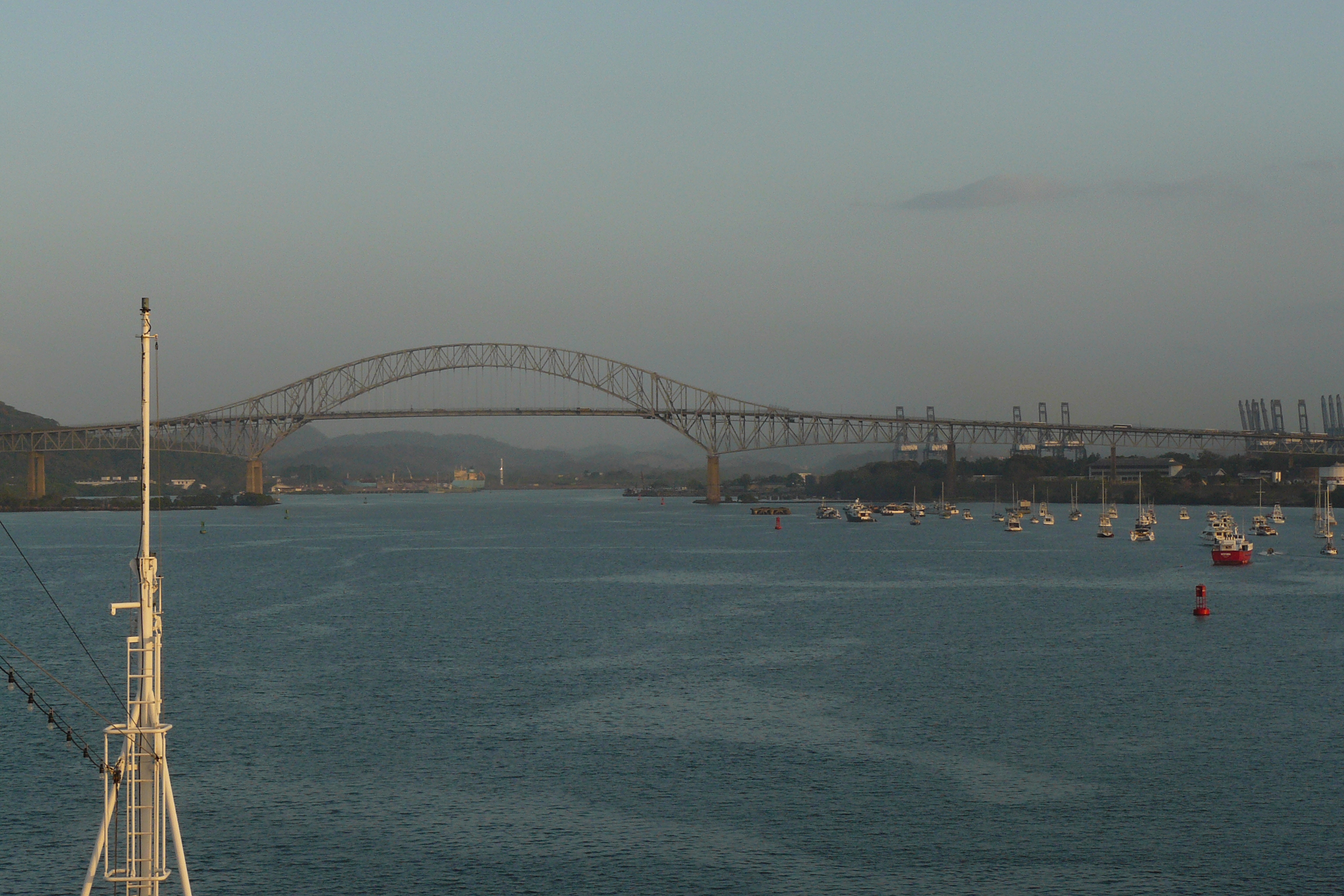
View of Bridge of the Americas

The idea of a permanent bridge over the canal had been proposed as a major priority as early as 1923. Subsequent administrations of Panama pressed this issue with the United States, which controlled the Canal Zone; and in 1955 the Remon–Eisenhower Treaty committed the United States to building a bridge.

A contract worth $20,000,000 was awarded to John F. Beasly & Company who built the bridge out of steel and reinforced concrete, and the project was initiated in a ceremony which took place on December 23, 1958, in the presence of United States Ambassador Julian Harrington, and Panamanian President Ernesto de la Guardia Navarro. Construction began on October 12, 1959, and took nearly two and a half years to complete.

The inauguration of the bridge took place on October 12, 1962, with great ceremony. The ribbon was cut by Maurice H. Thatcher, after which those present were allowed to walk across the bridge. The ceremony was given full nationwide coverage on radio and television; significant precautions were taken to manage the large crowds of people present. These proved inadequate, however, and pro-Panamanian protesters disrupted the ceremony, even removing the memorial plaques on the bridge.

=== Postconstruction ===
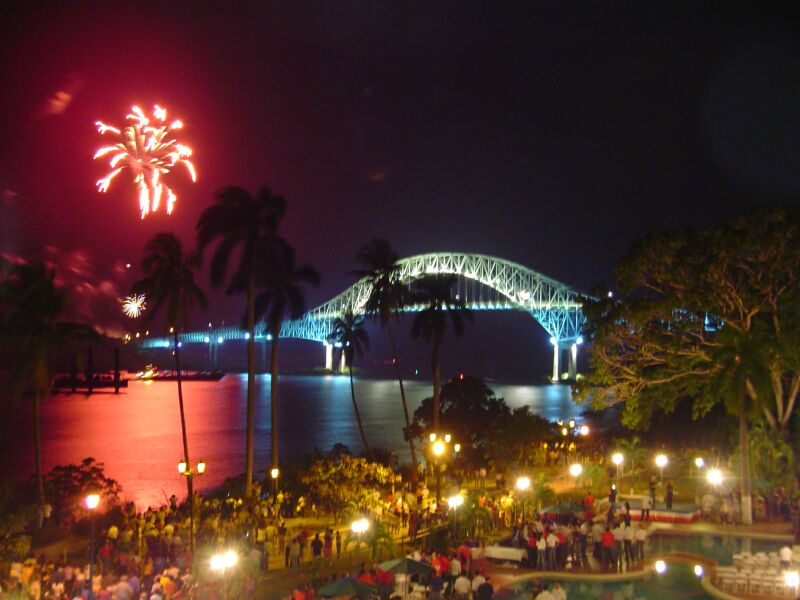
Bridge of the Americas at night

When opened, the bridge was an important part of the Pan-American Highway, and carried around 9,500 vehicles per day; however, this expanded over time, and by 2004 the bridge was carrying 35,000 vehicles per day. The bridge therefore became a significant bottleneck on the highway, which led to the construction of the Centennial Bridge, which now carries the Pan-American Highway too. On May 18, 2010, the bulk cargo ship Atlantic Hero struck one of the protective bases of the bridge after losing engine power, partially blocking that section of the canal to shipping traffic. The bridge did not receive damage and there were no fatalities. In December 2010, the Centennial Bridge access road collapsed in a mudslide, and commercial traffic was diverted to the Bridge of The Americas.

== The "Thatcher Ferry Bridge" ==
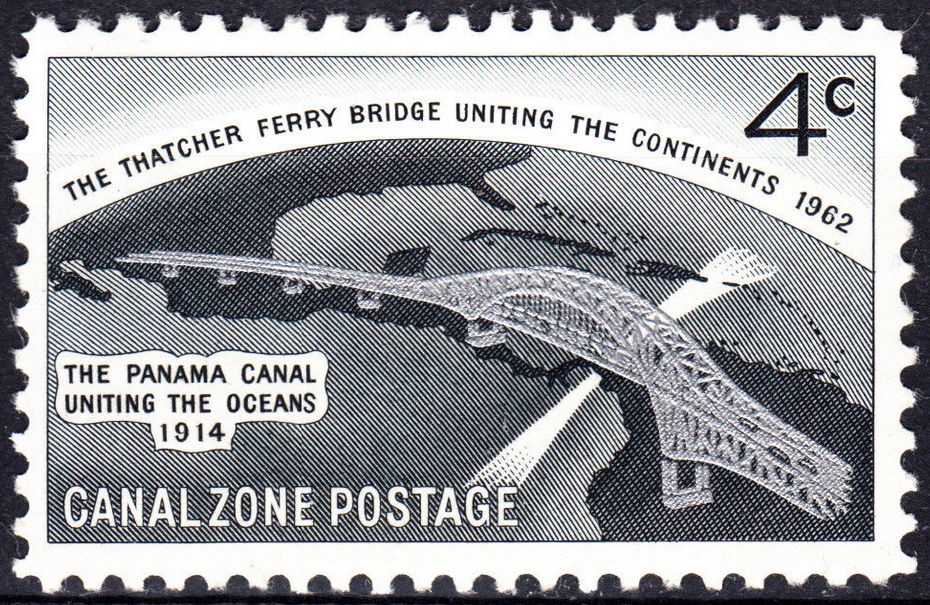
Thatcher Ferry Bridge, 4c Commemorative Issue of 1962

The bridge was originally named "Thatcher Ferry Bridge", after the original ferry which crossed the canal at about the same point. The ferry was named after Maurice H. Thatcher, a former member of the Canal Commission, who introduced the legislation which created the ferry. Thatcher cut the tape at the inauguration of the bridge.

The name was unpopular with the government of Panama, however, which preferred the name "Bridge of the Americas". The Panamanian view was made official by a resolution of the National Assembly on October 2, 1962, ten days before the inauguration.

The resolution read as follows:

The bridge over the Panama Canal shall bear the name Bridge of the Americas. Said name will be used exclusively to identify said bridge.

Panamanian government officials shall reject any document in which reference is made to the bridge by any name other than "Bridge of the Americas". A copy of this resolution, with the appropriate note on style, shall be forwarded to all legislative bodies of the world, so that all may give the bridge the name chosen by this honorable assembly, complying with the express will of the Panamanian people. Given in the city of Panama on the second day of the month of October of nineteen hundred and sixty-two.

President, Jorge Rubén Rosas
Secretary, Alberto Arango N.

During the inauguration ceremony (which was concluded with the playing of the "Thatcher Ferry Bridge March"), U.S. Under Secretary of State George Wildman Ball said in his speech: "we can look today to this bridge as a new and bright step toward the realization of that dream of a Pan-American Highway, which is now almost a reality. The grand bridge we inaugurate today — truly a bridge of the Americas — completes the last stage of the highway from the United States to Panama".

Nonetheless, the official name of the bridge became the "Thatcher Ferry Bridge" and remained so until Panamanian control in 1979.

Postage stamps were issued with the name "Thatcher Ferry Bridge". In the postage stamps and postal history of the Canal Zone they are well known for an error on one sheet where the bridge is missing.

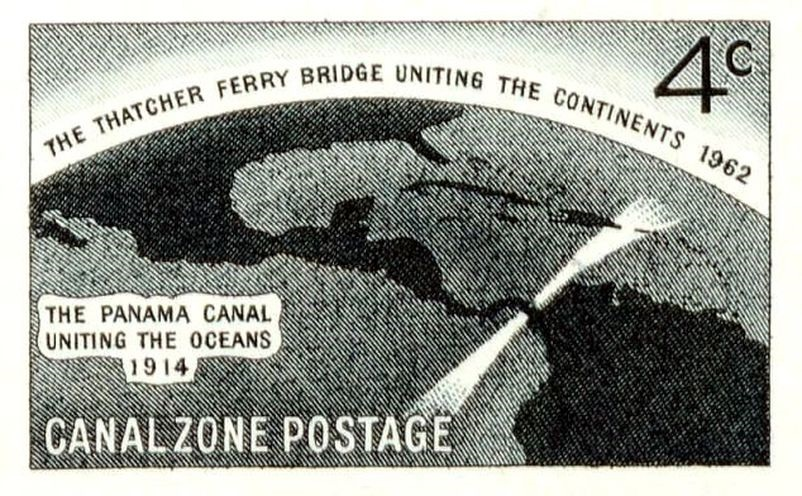
CZ Thatcher Ferry Bridge error, 4c, 1962 Issue

== See also ==
- Crossings of the Panama Canal
- The Pan-American Highway
- The Centennial Bridge
- Postage stamps and postal history of the Canal Zone
- List of bridges in Panama
