= Centennial Bridge, Panama =

Centennial Bridge
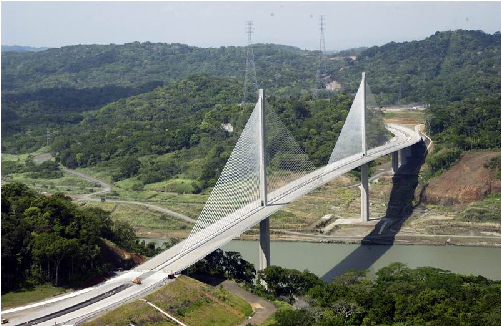
- Coordinates: 9°1′48.19″N 79°38′8.47″W
- Carries: 6 lanes of the Pan-American Highway
- Crosses: Culebra Cut of the Panama Canal
- Locale: Panama
- Official name: Puente Centenario

Characteristics
- Design: Cable-stayed bridge
- Total length: 1,052 m (3,451 ft)
- Longest span: 420 metres (1,380 ft)
- Clearance below: 80 m (260 ft)

History
- Construction cost: $120 million USD
- Opened: 15 August 2004

Location
- Interactive map of Centennial Bridge

Panama's Centennial Bridge (Spanish: Puente Centenario) is a major bridge crossing the Panama Canal. It was built to supplement the overcrowded Bridge of the Americas and to replace it as the carrier of the Pan-American Highway. Upon its opening in 2004, it became the second permanent crossing of the canal.

== Description ==
The Centennial Bridge is the second of three major road crossing of the Panama Canal, the first being the Bridge of the Americas. (Small service bridges are built in the lock structures at Miraflores and Gatún Locks, but these bridges are only usable when the lock gates are closed and have limited capacity.)

The Centennial Bridge is located 15 km (9.3 mi) north of the Bridge of the Americas and crosses the Culebra Cut (Gaillard Cut) close to the Pedro Miguel locks. New freeway sections, connecting Arraijan in the west to Cerro Patacon in the east via the bridge, significantly alleviate congestion on the Bridge of the Americas.

== History ==
The Bridge of the Americas, which opened in 1962, was the only major road crossing of the Panama Canal. The traffic over this bridge was originally around 9,500 vehicles per day; however, this expanded over time, and by 2004 the bridge was carrying 35,000 vehicles per day.

Since the bridge represented a major bottleneck in the Pan-American Highway, Panama's Ministry of Public Works requested tenders for a second canal crossing in October 2000. The contract to build a replacement bridge was awarded in March 2002. An ambitious schedule of just 29 months was set for construction, so that the bridge could open on the 90th anniversary of the first ship transit of the Panama Canal by the cargo ship Ancon, on 15 August 1914. The bridge was named for Panama's centennial, which occurred on 3 November 2003.

The new bridge was designed by a joint venture between T.Y. Lin International and the Louis Berger Group Inc, and constructed by German-based Bilfinger Berger Ingenieurbau GmbH using resources from its Australian subsidiary Baulderstone Hornibrook. The architects were Elle Sokolow working as an Architect for Geiger-Berger Associates and the Boston-based transportation architect Miguel Rosales from Rosales + Partners who created the concept and initial aesthetic designs for the Panama-Centennial Bridge. Structural engineering contracts were awarded to Leonhardt, Andrä and Partner.

The bridge was inaugurated on schedule on 15 August 2004, although it was opened for traffic on 2 September 2005, when the new highways leading to it were finished.

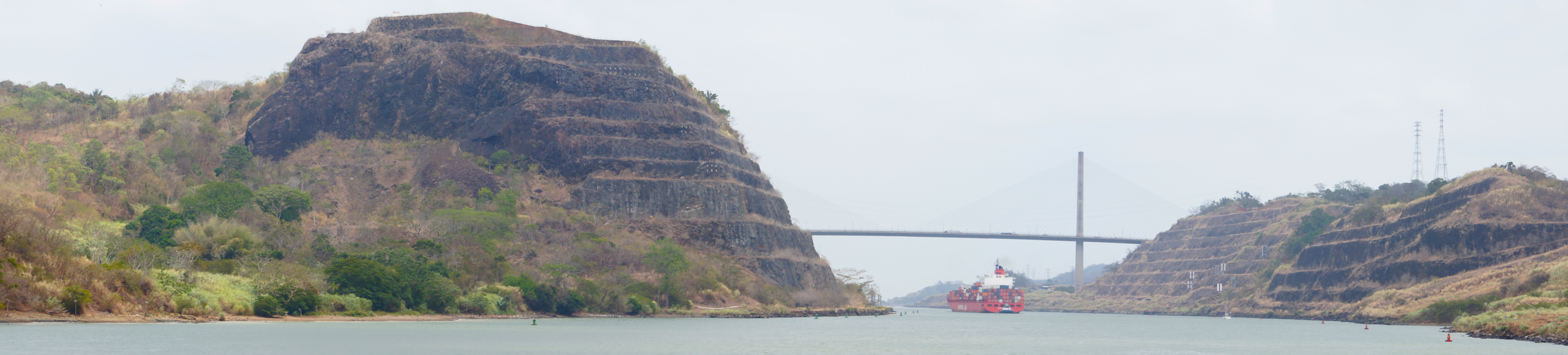
Part of the access to the Centennial Bridge collapsed in December 2010, following heavy rain and flooding. In November 2011 full traffic was restored.

== Construction ==
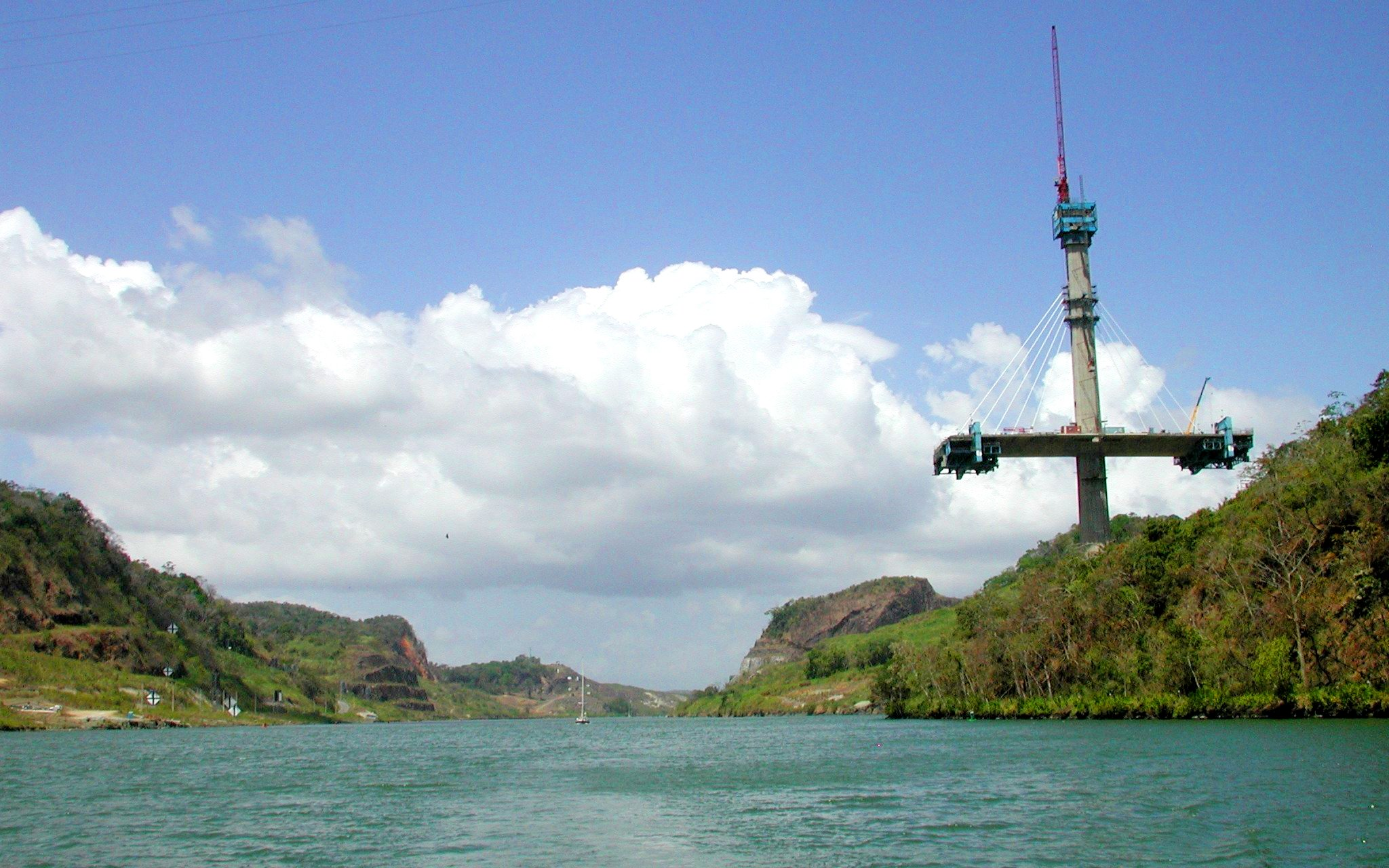
The Centennial Bridge, under construction, dwarfs the sailboat passing beneath it, whose mast is approximately 17 metres (56 feet) high. The pylon under construction is to be 184 metres (604 ft).

The bridge is a cable-stayed design with a total span of 1,052 m (3,451 ft). The main span is 420 m (1,380 ft) and clears the canal by 80 m (260 ft), allowing large vessels to pass below it. The bridge is supported by two towers, each 184 m (604 ft) high. The deck carries six lanes of traffic across the canal.

The Centennial Bridge is designed to withstand the earthquakes which are frequently recorded in the canal area. It was built by the German construction firm Bilfinger.

The West Tower was built about 50 m inland to allow space for the future widening of the Panama Canal.

== Awards ==
- 2005 Bridge Award of Excellence, American Segmental Bridge Institute (ASBI).
- 2007 Merit Award, Consulting Engineers and Land Surveyors of California (CELSOC)

== Gallery ==
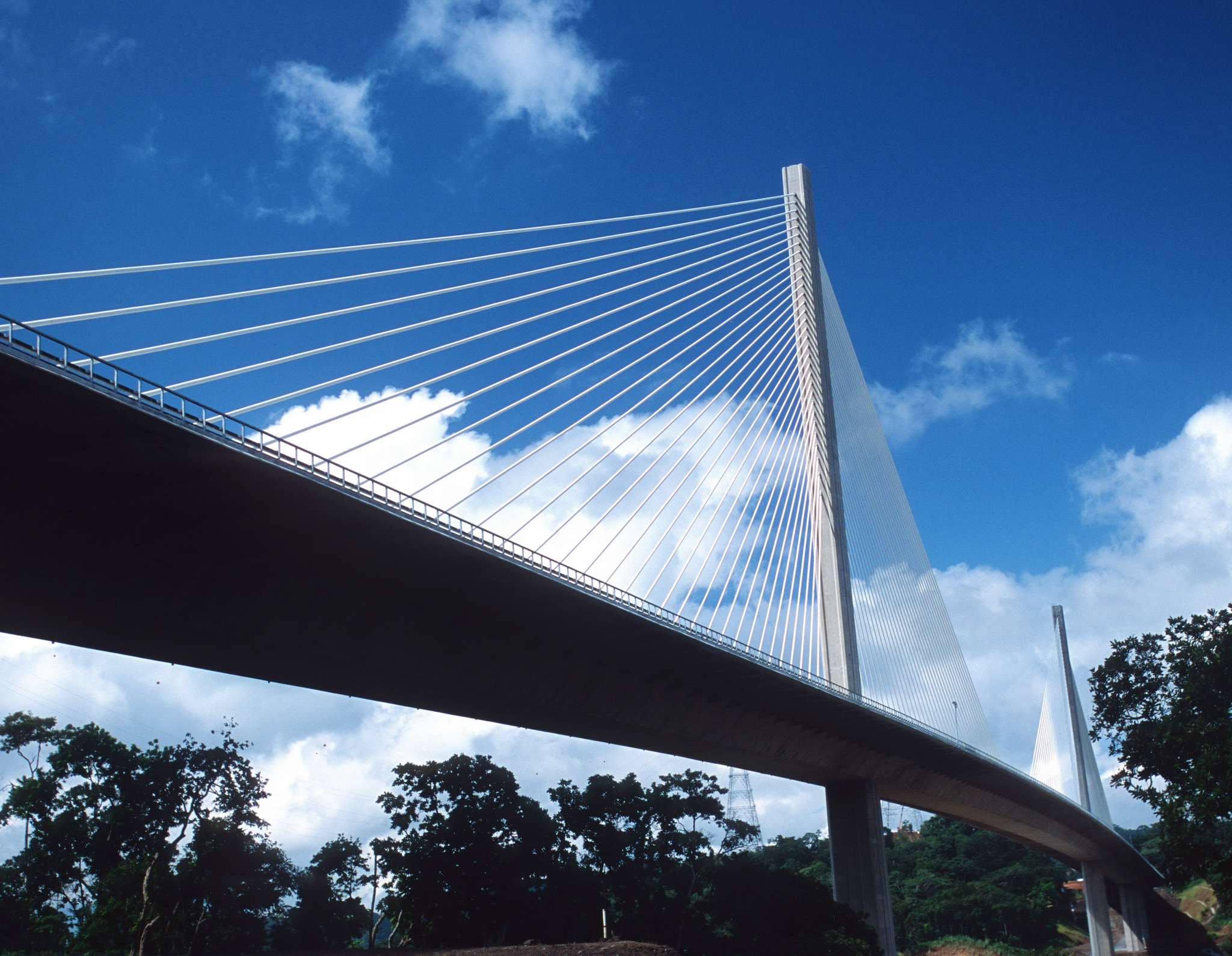

== See also ==
- List of bridges in Panama
