= Atlantic, Virginia =

- Census-designated place
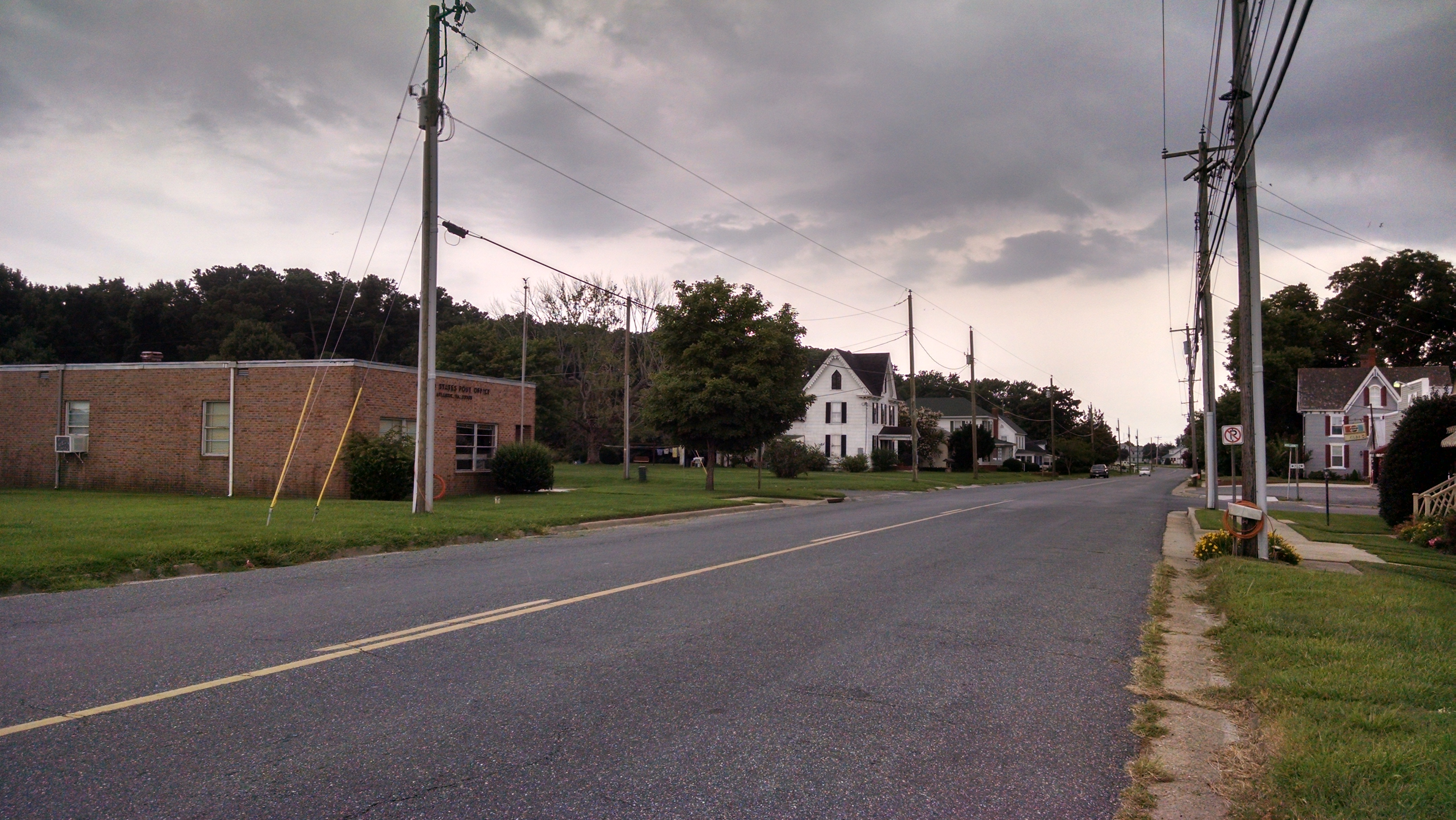
- Atlantic in August 2014

- Location in Accomack County and the state of Virginia.

- Location within Virginia Location within the United States
- Coordinates: 37°54′02″N 75°30′28″W
- Country: United States
- State: Virginia
- County: Accomack

Area
  - Total: 6.13 sq mi (15.9 km^{2})
  - Land: 5.90 sq mi (15.3 km^{2})
  - Water: 0.23 sq mi (0.60 km^{2})
- Elevation: 36 ft (11 m)

Population (2020)
  - Total: 808
  - Density: 137/sq mi (52.9/km^{2})
- Time zone: UTC-5 (Eastern (EST))
  - Summer (DST): UTC-4 (EDT)
- Area codes: 757, 948
- GNIS feature ID: 2584800

Atlantic is a census-designated place (CDP) in Accomack County, Virginia, United States. Per the 2020 census, the population was 808.

== Geography ==
The CDP lies at an elevation of 36 feet.

== Demographics ==
Historical population
Census	Pop.	Note	%±
2010	862		—
2020	808		−6.3%
U.S. Decennial Census; 2010 2020

Atlantic was first listed as a census designated place in the 2010 U.S. census.

=== 2020 census ===
Atlantic CDP, Virginia – Racial and ethnic composition Note: the US Census treats Hispanic/Latino as an ethnic category. This table excludes Latinos from the racial categories and assigns them to a separate category. Hispanics/Latinos may be of any race.
Race / Ethnicity (NH = Non-Hispanic)	Pop 2010	Pop 2020	% 2010	% 2020
White alone (NH)	544	514	63.11%	63.61%
Black or African American alone (NH)	280	246	32.48%	30.45%
Native American or Alaska Native alone (NH)	8	1	0.93%	0.12%
Asian alone (NH)	5	3	0.58%	0.37%
Native Hawaiian or Pacific Islander alone (NH)	0	0	0.00%	0.00%
Other race alone (NH)	0	0	0.00%	0.00%
Mixed race or Multiracial (NH)	11	18	1.28%	2.23%
Hispanic or Latino (any race)	14	26	1.62%	3.22%
Total	862	808	100.00%	100.00%
