= Portline =

Portline Transportes Marítimos Internacionais, SA.
- Company type: Limited liability company
- Industry: Ship transport
- Founded: October 1984
- Headquarters: Lisbon, Portugal
- Website: http://www.portline.pt

Portline Transportes Marítimos Internacionais, SA., often simply called Portline is a Portuguese shipping company. The company has diverse business activities, including dry bulk, containerised, and break-bulk cargo shipping, shipping agency, forwarding and logistics services, ship management and manning, ship brokerage and chartering, and a container depot service.

The company was originally state-owned and was privatized in 1991. The Portline fleet has a capacity of close to 1,000,000 tonnes deadweight (DWT), consisting of bulk carriers and container ships in the capesize, panamax and supramax, and other size classes.

The company's general cargo services operate primarily in Europe, reaching to Cape Verde, The Canary Islands, West Africa, and Brazil. Its bulk cargo service, which includes coal, ore, fertilizer and grain, serves markets in the Atlantic, Pacific and Indian Oceans.

== Fleet ==
Portline Fleet
Name	Type	Built	GT	DWT
MV Achilleus	Bulker	2001	28718	50992
MV Angela	Bulker	2004	30064	52571
MV Angela Star	Bulker	1998	38372	73978
MV Adee	Bulker	1993	7361	9198
MV Carouge	Bulker	1992	77273	149383
MV Christina I	Container	1993	7361	9198
MV Florinda I	Bulker	2005	30064	52498
MV Ina	Bulker	2003	88702	176423
MV Manx Lion	Container	1998	11153	16500
MV Navios Cielo	Bulker	2003	38871	75834
MV Olympias	Bulker	2001	29999	52817
MV Port Douro	Container	1992	4303	1690
MV Port Estoril	Bulker	2001	29986	52822
MV Port Tejo	Container	1993	4303	5314
MV Sabrina I	Bulker	2005	30064	52501
MV Setubal	Container	1997	11153	16730

The Portline fleet consists of 16 ships. Of these, 10 are bulk carriers and 6 are container ships. The bulker section of the fleet has 2 Capesize ships, 2 Panamax ships, and 6 Supramax ships.

As of 2008, the fleet has ships ranging from 3 to 16 years of age with an average age of over 9 years. Its oldest vessels are the MV Carouge and MV Port Douro built in 1992. Its newest vessels are the MV Florinda I and MV Sabrina I built in 2005.

In terms of deadweight tonnage, the combined fleet has a capacity of 848,449 DWT. The two largest vessels are the bulkers MV Carouge and MV Ina at 176,423 DWT and 149,383 DWT respectively. At the other end of the size spectrum, the company operates four small ships under 10,000 DWT: the MV Adee, MV Christina I, MV Port Douro, and the MV Port Tejo. The average capacity is just over 53,000 DWT fleetwide.
