= B.Delta =

The B.Delta is a family of bulk cargo ships designed by Deltamarin.

== Design ==
Generally, the B.Delta design has a relatively wide beam and shallow draft; with a combination of low fuel consumption and high deadweight.

The exact specification varies, but a recent order for handysize B.Delta37 carriers featured:

- 179.99 m length
- 30 m beam
- 10.5 m Scantling draft
- 17.6 mt daily consumption at 14 knot service speed
- 38,500 t deadweight
- 50,000 m^{3} cargo capacity

Other larger and smaller variants include the B.Delta25, B.Delta43, B.Delta64, B.Delta82 and B.Delta210.

== Sales ==
The ships are built in several third-party shipyards following Deltamarin's design. Over 120 B.Delta ships have been ordered, including 21 orders for B.Delta37 ships built by Yangfang Shipyard.
