= MV Flare =

Ship built in 1972, sank 1998

History

Cyprus
- Name: M/V Flare
- Owner: ABTA Shipping Co. Ltd., Limassol, Cyprus
- Operator: Trade Fortune Inc., Piraeus, Greece
- Port of registry: Limassol, Cyprus
- Builder: Hakodate Dock Co. Ltd., Japan
- Launched: 7 June 1972
- Identification: IMO number: 7220477
- Fate: Sank, 16 January 1998

General characteristics
- Type: Bulk carrier
- Tonnage: 16,398 GT
- Length: 180.8 m (593 ft 2 in)
- Beam: 23.1 m (75 ft 9 in)
- Draught: 6.93 m (22 ft 9 in)
- Depth: 14.5 m (47 ft 7 in)
- Propulsion: Sulzer-IHI engine, 8,827 kW (11,837 hp)
- Speed: 15.1 knots (28.0 km/h; 17.4 mph)

MV Flare (P3GL2) was a Cypriot-registered bulk carrier that sank with the loss of 21 lives in the Gulf of St. Lawrence on January 16, 1998.

Flare was en route from Rotterdam to Quebec when she broke in two during severe weather, approximately 20 nmi (37 km) west of Saint-Pierre-et-Miquelon on January 16, 1998. 21 crew members perished, and four survived. The crew was able to send one truncated 20-second distress call that was received by the Canadian Coast Guard, who had to determine who and where the ship was within an area with a 40-mile (64 km) radius. Some of Flare's crewmembers on the sinking stern section saw the bow of another ship appear to approach them, only to realize that it was the separated front half of their own vessel. The propeller on the stern section had still been turning, and had brought them back towards it.

The survivors were rescued by a CH-113 Labrador helicopter from CFB Greenwood, Nova Scotia, belonging to 413 Search and Rescue Squadron of the Canadian Forces. The helicopter's crew consisted of aircraft commander Capt. C. Brown, co-pilot Capt. R. Gough, flight engineer/winch operator M.Cpl. R. Butler, and SAR Technicians Sgt. Tony Isaacs and M.Cpl. P. Jackman.

The lightly clothed survivors were taken to hospital in Saint-Pierre-et-Miquelon and treated for extreme hypothermia. The bodies that were recovered were collected by Marine Nationale, Canadian Coast Guard, and Royal Canadian Navy ships including HMCS Montreal—and a CH-113 Labrador helicopter of 103 Search and Rescue Squadron from CFB Gander.

Flare's stern sank within 30 minutes. The floating bow section drifted on the surface for several days, eventually sinking south of Cape Breton Island.

The Transportation Safety Board of Canada determined that the following contributed to Flare's sinking:

1. Severe weather
2. The ship was traveling empty to Montreal (to pick up a load of grain), which caused her to ride high in the water. The violent waves caused the bow to hit the water hard during each swell.
3. The ballast tanks, which ordinarily would be flooded to cause the ship to ride lower in the water, were not able to be completely filled as a number of them were corroded and needed to be repaired.
4. The steel in the hull was found (after the sinking) to have fatigue cracks.

in addition, Flare was over 25 years old, approximately 8 years past the average lifespan of a bulk carrier.

The combination of the ship riding high on violent swells, hitting the water hard and with fatigue cracks, caused the ship to break apart.
