= Cornships Management and Agency =

Turkish shipping company

Cornships Management and Agency Inc.
- Company type: Corporation
- Industry: Ship transport
- Headquarters: Istanbul, Turkey
- Key people: Akin Falay, Charles Gamon (co-founders)
- Website: http://www.cornships.com/index.htm

Cornships Management and Agency Inc. was a Turkish shipping company. The company managed and provided agency services for the fleet owned and controlled by Corn Marine Ltd. of Malta. The company specialized in dry bulk cargo. Cornships was divided into four departments: operations, technical, crewing, and commercial & agency department.

== History ==
Cornships Management was a privately held corporation founded by Akin Falay and Charles Gamon. They founded the company after Falay dissolved his partnership with Semih Sohtorik in Semih Sohtorik Management and Agency (SSMA). Falay, born in 1943, was a graduate of the Law School of the University of Istanbul. He formerly worked for Istanbul's Koctuc Line and in New York for eight years as the Thule Ship Agency. He joined SSMA in 1977. Charles Gamon commenced shipping in 1979 and founded Cornavin Shipping with Falay and Semih Sohtorik in 1982.

== Fleet ==
Cornships' fleet initially consisted of three vessels, and grew to fourteen. The ships, categorized as minibulkers, ranged from 8,038 tonnes deadweight (DWT) and 9,653 DWT. All the ships were built in the 1980s. The cargo holds were shaped to admit intermodal containers (shipping containers), and featured large open hatch covers, as well as tween-decks that could hinge and fold up. The ships also all featured cargo cranes with a 50 metric ton capacity. The ships were given names beginning with the word Corn, for example Corn Rose and Corn Diva.

The fleet was broken down into two classes, the Corn Lilly class and the slightly smaller Corn Brook class. The former consisted of five ships, built between 1986 and 1988. These had a capacity of 9,653 DWT, a gross tonnage of 5,974 tons, and a length overall of 113 metres (371 ft).

The smaller Corn Brook class consisted of two ships, both built in 1984. They had a capacity of 8,038 DWT, a gross tonnage of 4,983 tons, and a length overall of 106.29 metres (348.7 ft).

The Cornships fleet has worked in the worldwide arena, but specialized in the Europe, Mediterranean, Black Sea and West African markets. The company dealt in cargoes such as pipes, projects, bulk-bagged cocoa, steel, bagged and general cargoes.

All the ships owned by Corn Marine Ltd, Malta have now been sold.
