= Handysize =

Class of smaller cargo ships

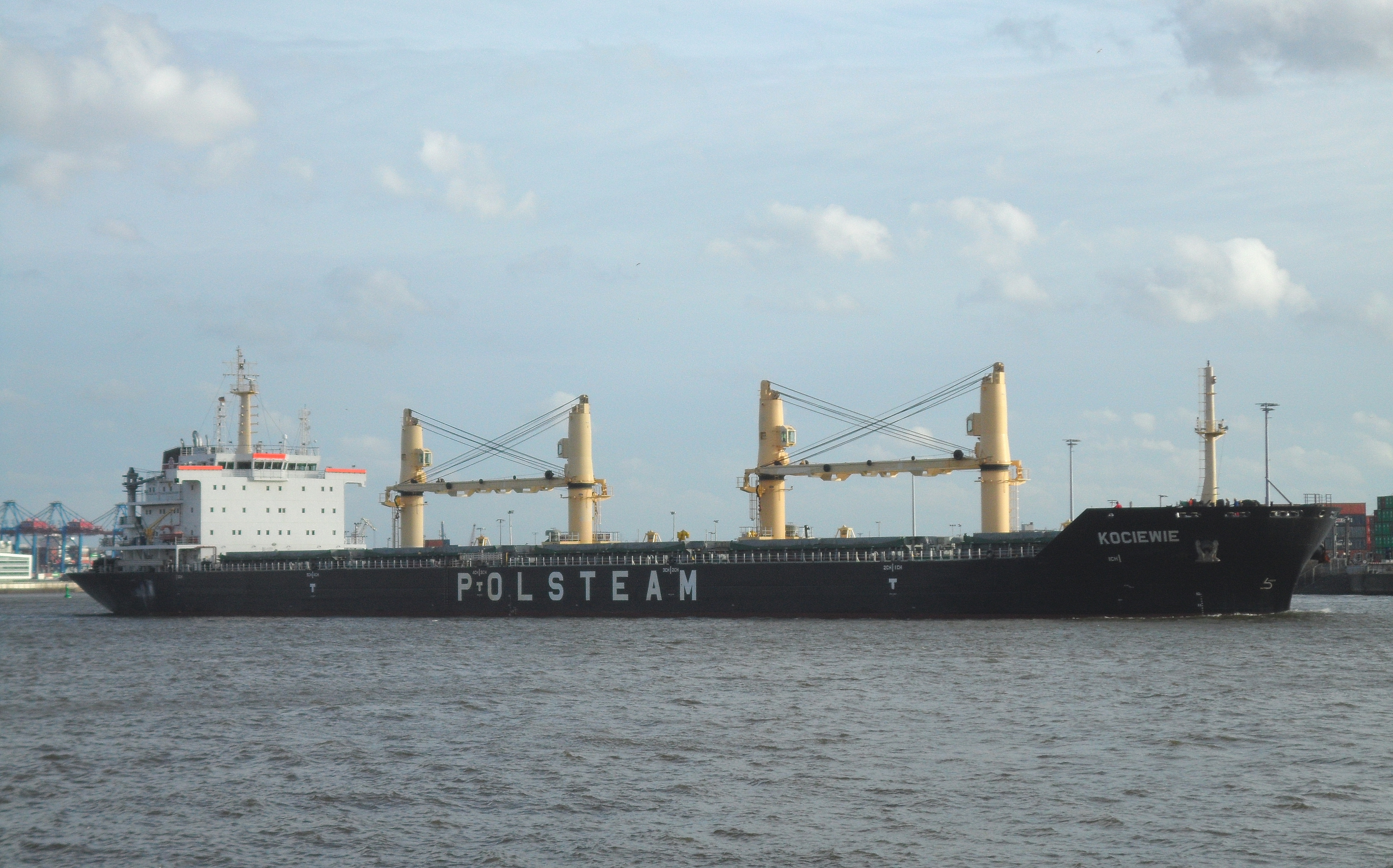
Polish bulk carrier Kociewie in the Port of Hamburg

Handysize is a naval architecture term for smaller bulk carriers or oil tanker with deadweight of up to 50,000 tonnes, although there is no official definition in terms of exact tonnages. Handysize is also sometimes used to refer to the span of up to 60,000 tons, with the vessels above 35,000 tonnes referred to as Handymax or Supramax.

Their small size allows Handysize vessels to enter smaller ports to pick up cargoes, and because in most cases they are 'geared' - i.e. fitted with cranes - they can often load and discharge cargoes at ports which lack cranes or other cargo handling systems. Compared to larger bulk carriers, handysizes carry a wider variety of cargo types. These include steel products, grain, metal ores, phosphate, cement, logs, woodchips and other types of so-called 'break bulk cargo'. They are numerically the most common size of bulk carrier, with nearly 2000 units in service totalling about 43 million tons.

Handysize bulkers are built mainly by shipyards in Japan, Korea, China, Vietnam, the Philippines and India, though a few other countries also have the capacity to build such vessels. The most common industry-standard specification handysize bulker is now about 32,000 metric tons of deadweight on a summer draft of about 10 metres (33 ft), and features 5 cargo holds with hydraulically operated hatch covers, with four 30 metric ton cranes for cargo handling. Some handysizes are also fitted with stanchions to enable logs to be loaded in stacks on deck. Such vessels are often referred to as 'handy loggers'. - Despite multiple recent orders for new ships, the handysize sector still has the highest average age profile of the major bulk carrier sectors.

== Trade routes ==
Today, most of handysize vessels operate within regional trade routes. These ships are capable of traveling to small ports with length and draught restrictions, as well as lacking the infrastructure for cargo loading and unloading. They are used to carry small bulk cargoes, often in parcel size where individual cargo holds may have a different commodity. Their dry bulk cargo includes iron ore, coal, cement, phosphate, finished steel products, wooden logs, fertilizer, and grains to name a few.

== See also ==
- B.Delta
- Seawaymax
