= Stowage factor =

Metric for space taken up by one tonne of cargo in a ship

In shipping, the stowage factor indicates how many cubic metres of space one tonne (or cubic feet of space one long ton) of a particular type of cargo occupies in a hold of a cargo ship. It is calculated as the ratio of the stowage space required under normal conditions, including the stowage losses caused by the means of transportation and packaging, to the weight of the cargo. The stowage factor can be used in ship design and as a reference to evaluate the efficiency of use of the cargo space on a ship.

== Variability ==
The stowage factor varies from one type of commodity to another — for example iron ore has a stowage factor of 0.40 (m^{3}/mt), meaning that the space needed by one tonne of ore is only one sixth of that required to stow one tonne of woodchips that have a stowage factor of 2.5. This means that if a ship designed to carry woodchips is loaded with iron ore, only a small part of the hold capacity can be utilized, and a bulk carrier designed to carry iron ore cannot be loaded to the maximum draft with woodchips, leaving much of its deadweight tonnage unutilized. Thus the stowage factor is taken into account in ship design when determining the size of cargo holds, and specialized ships such as ore carriers and car carriers are built for cargoes with a stowage factor that departs significantly from the average.

The stowage factor also depends on the type of packaging, being the lowest for unpackaged bulk cargo. While most commonly used for dry bulk cargo, a stowage factor can also be calculated for liquid bulk cargo and other commodities such as containers or cars. Stowage factors for several types of cargo are presented in the following table.

Type of cargo	Stowage factor	
Type of cargo	(cu ft/LT)	(m^{3}/MT)
Iron ore	14	0.40
Grain (heavy)	45	1.30
Coal	48	1.40
Woodchips	90	2.50
Containers (TEU)	56–105	1.6–3.0
Cars	150	4.2
Light crude oil	37.6	1.07
Heavy crude oil	33.7	0.95
Water	35.315	1

== Stowage Factor (SF) Examples ==
Stowage Factor (SF) Example 1: Ship A
Deadweight Cargo Capacity (DWCC): 55,000 mtons
Grain Cubic Capacity: 70,000 m^{3} (2,470,000 ft^{3})
Cargo: 55,000 mtons of Bulk Phosphate
Bulk Phosphate Stowage Factor (SF) about 0.90 m^{3}/ton (32 ft^{3}/ton)
In fact, Ship A has space for 55,000 mtons on her holds
70,000/0.90 = 77,000 mtons or 2,470,000/32 = 77,000 mtons (rounded)
However, Ship A can only take 55,000 mtons in weight of Bulk Phosphate before Ship A loadline is submerged

Stowage Factor (SF) Example 2: Ship B
Deadweight Cargo Capacity (DWCC): 55,000 mtons
Grain Cubic Capacity: 70,000 m^{3} (2,470,000 ft^{3})
Cargo: 55,000 mtons of Barley
Barley Stowage Factor (SF) about 1.47 m^{3}/ton (52 ft^{3}/ton)
In fact, Ship B can lift 55,000 mtons
70,000/1.47= 47,500 mtons or 2,470,000/52 = 47,500 mtons (rounded)
However, Ship B can only take 47,500 mtons in weight of Barley before Ship B is full and no more space is available in the Ship B's holds

== See also ==
- Packing density
