= Bulk carrier =

Ship made to transport unpackaged bulk cargo

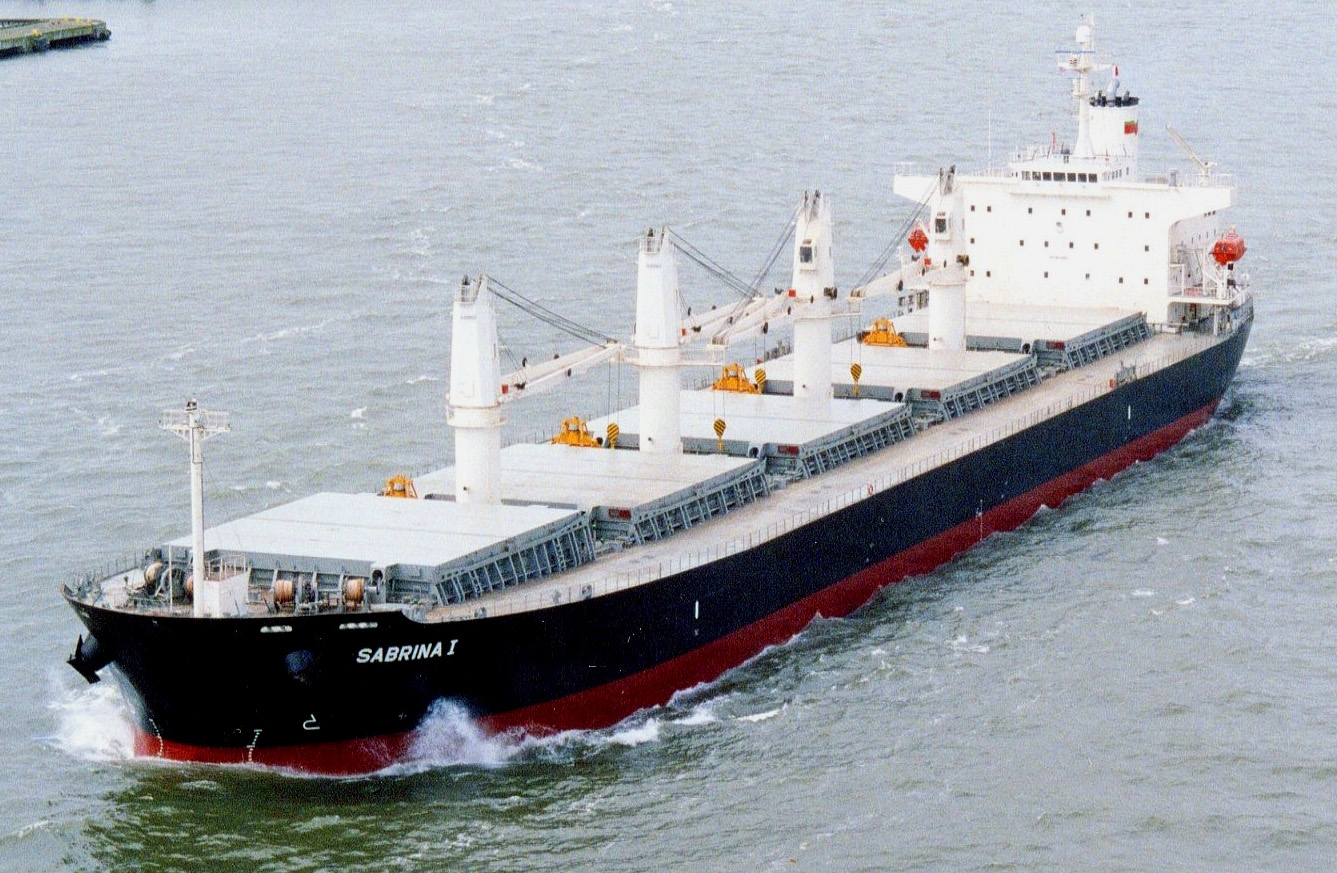
- Sabrina I is a modern Handymax bulk carrier

Class overview
- Subclasses: Handymax, Handysize, Panamax, Capesize, Chinamax
- Built: c. 1850–present
- Active: 12,700 vessels over 500 GT (2021)

General characteristics (typical)
- Type: Bulk carrier
- Tonnage: up to 400,000 DWT
- Length: 300 m (980 ft)
- Height: 40 m (130 ft)
- Propulsion: 2-stroke diesel engine and 1 propeller
- Speed: 12 knots (22 km/h; 14 mph)
- Notes: Rear house, full hull, series of large hatches
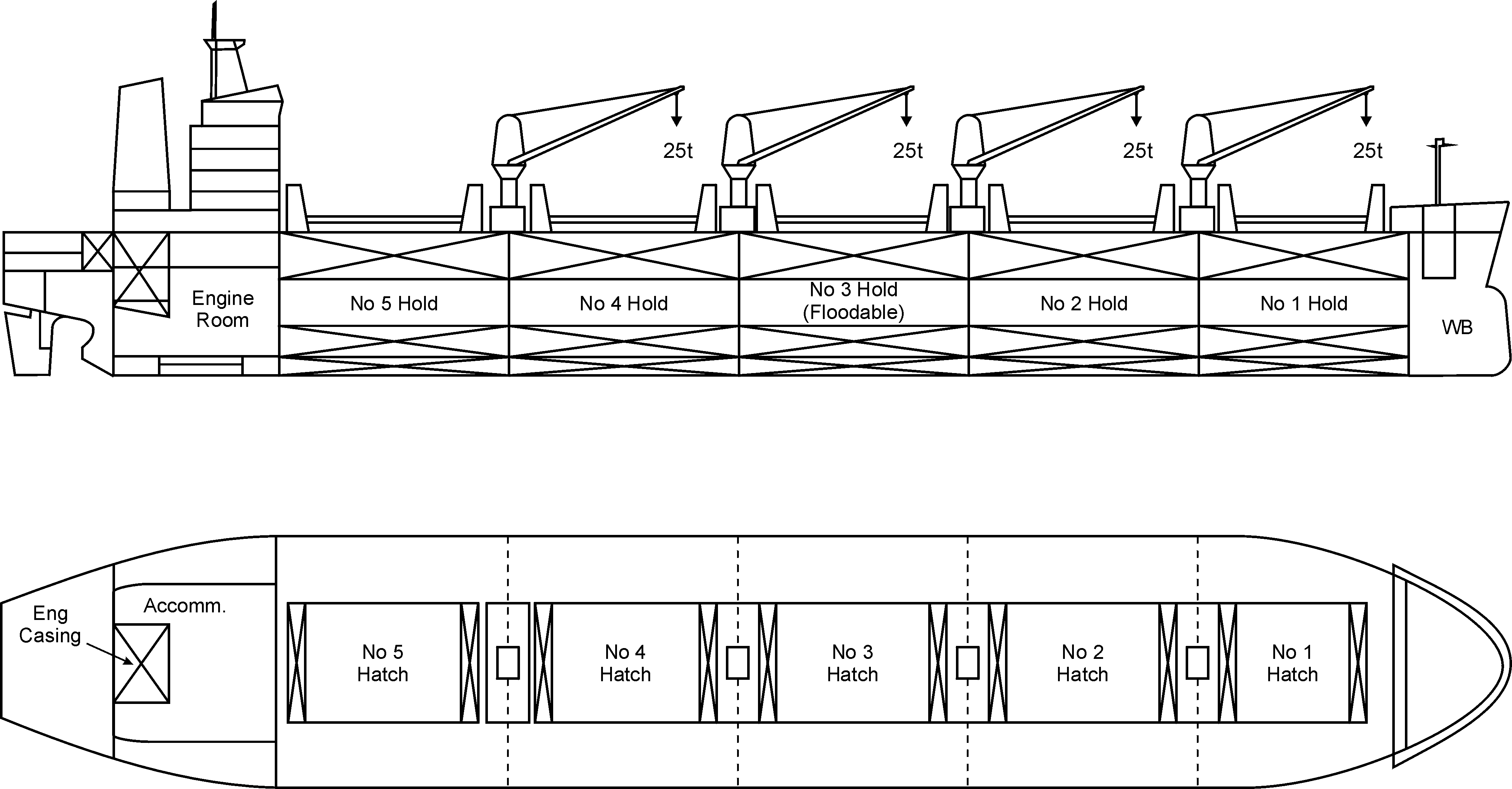
- Plans of a geared Handymax bulk carrier

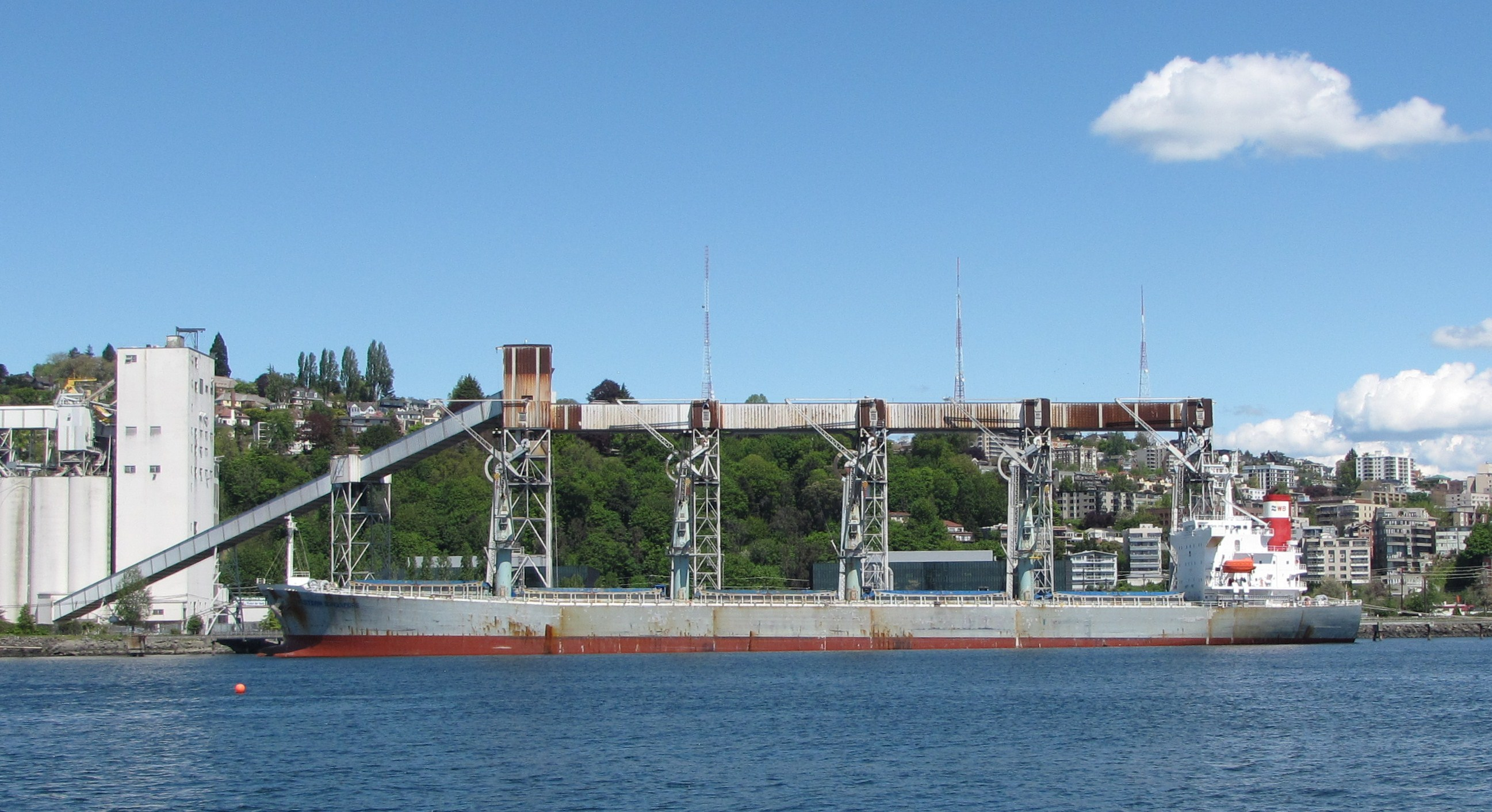
Bulk carrier and loading apparatus, Seattle (2010)

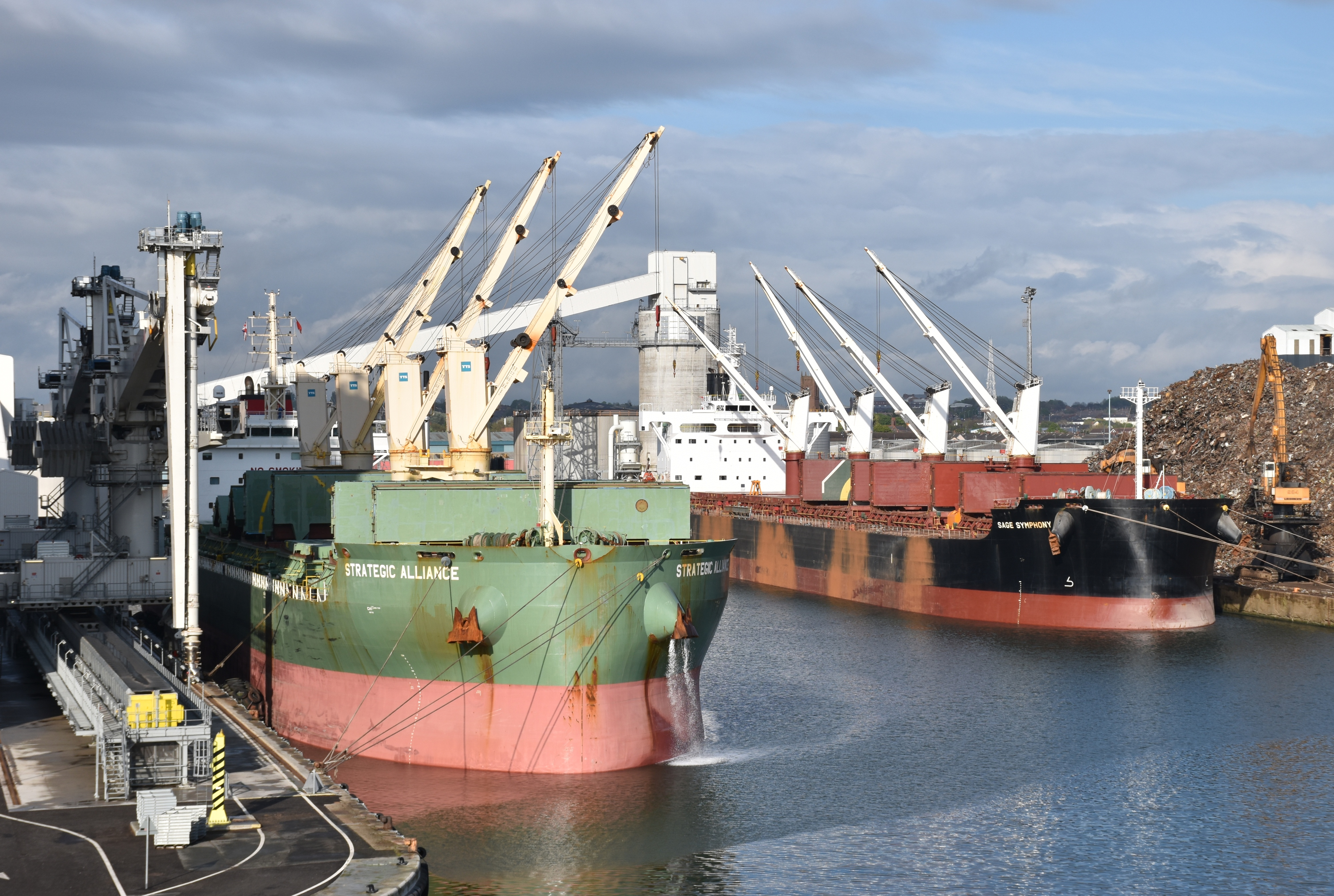
Bulk carriers in the Port of Liverpool (2018)

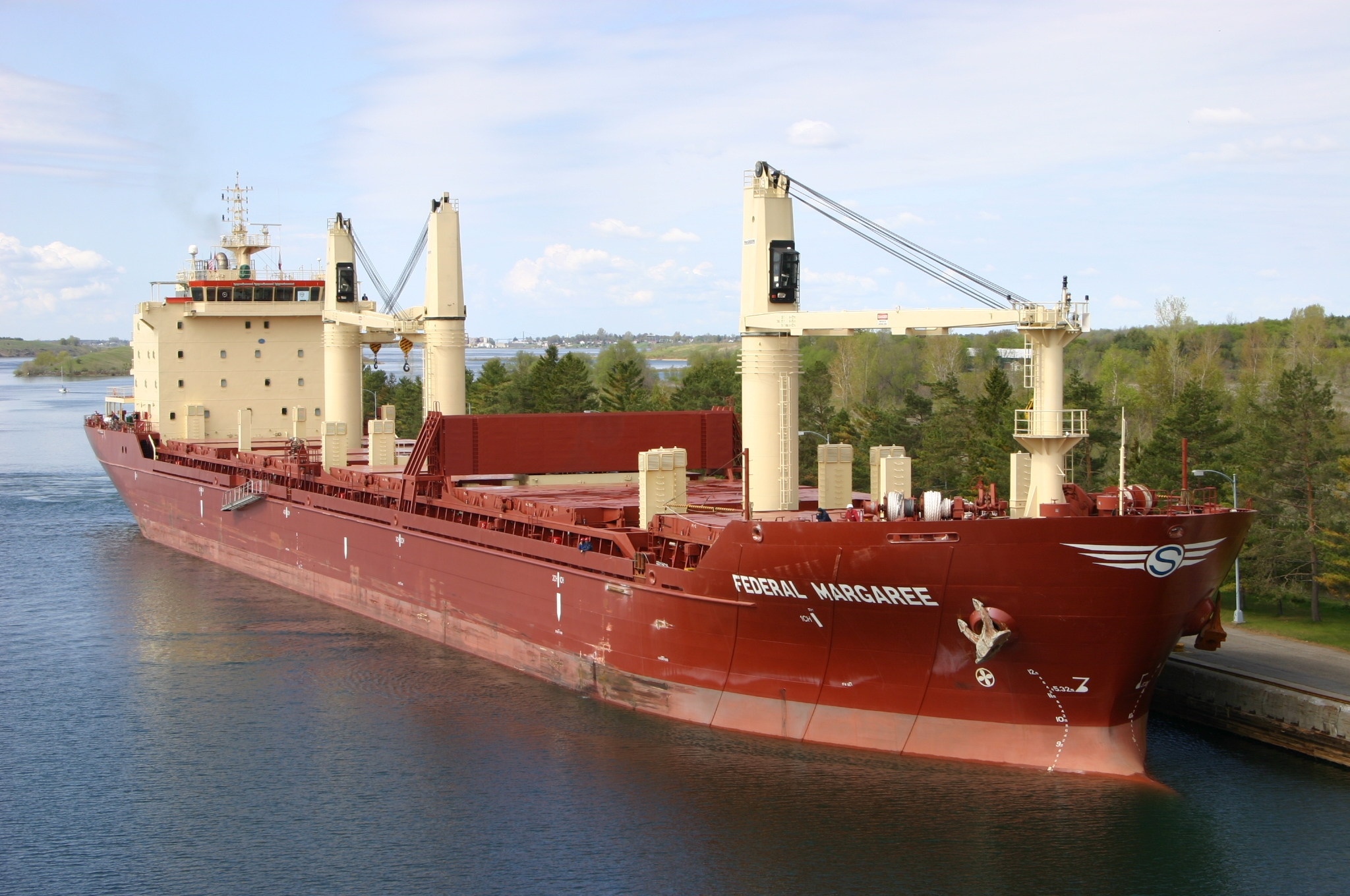
Federal Margaree on the Great Lakes (2005)

A bulk carrier or bulker is a merchant ship specially designed to transport unpackaged bulk cargo, typically grain, coal, ore, forest products, steel coils, or cement, in its cargo holds.

Since the first specialized bulk carrier was built in 1852, economic forces have led to increased size and sophistication of these ships. Today's bulk carriers are specially designed to maximize capacity, safety, efficiency, and durability.

Today, bulk carriers make up 21 percent of the world's merchant fleets, and they range in size from single-hold mini-bulk carriers to mammoth ore ships able to carry 400,000 metric tons of deadweight (DWT). A number of specialized designs exist: some can unload their own cargo, some depend on port facilities for unloading, and some even package the cargo as it is loaded. Over half of all bulk carriers have Greek, Japanese, or Chinese owners, and more than a quarter are registered in Panama. South Korea is the largest single builder of bulk carriers, and 82 percent of these ships were built in Asia.

On bulk carriers, crews are involved in operation, management, and maintenance of the vessel, taking care of safety, navigation, maintenance, and cargo care, in accordance with international maritime legislation. Crews can range in size from three people on the smallest ships to over 30 on the largest.

Cargo loading operations vary in complexity, and loading and discharging of cargo can take several days. Bulk carriers can be gearless (dependent upon terminal equipment) or geared (having cranes integral to the vessel).

Bulk cargo can be very dense, corrosive, or abrasive. This can present safety problems that can threaten a ship: problems such as cargo shifting, spontaneous combustion, and cargo saturation. The use of old ships that have corrosion problems—as well as the bulk carriers' large hatchways—have been linked to a spate of bulk carrier sinkings in the 1990s. These large hatchways, important for efficient cargo handling, can allow the entry of large volumes of water in storms and accelerate sinking once a vessel has listed or heeled. New international regulations have since been introduced to improve ship design and inspection and to streamline the process for crews to abandon ship.

== Definition ==
Bulk carrier midship section - (3) topside tanks, (5) bilge hopper tanks.

The term bulk carrier has been defined in varying ways. As of 1999, the International Convention for the Safety of Life at Sea defines a bulk carrier as "a ship constructed with a single deck, top side tanks and hopper side tanks in cargo spaces and intended to primarily carry dry cargo in bulk; an ore carrier; or a combination carrier." Most classification societies use a broader definition, by which a bulk carrier is any ship that carries dry unpackaged goods. Multipurpose cargo ships can carry bulk cargo, but can also carry other cargoes and are not specifically designed for bulk carriage. The term "dry bulk carrier" is used to distinguish bulk carriers from bulk liquid carriers such as oil, chemical, or liquefied petroleum gas carriers. Very small bulk carriers are almost indistinguishable from general cargo ships, and they are often classified based more on the ship's use than its design.

A number of abbreviations are used to describe bulk carriers. "OBO" describes a bulk carrier that carries a combination of ore, bulk, and oil, and "O/O" is used for combination oil and ore carriers. The terms "VLOC", "VLBC", "ULOC", and "ULBC" for very large and ultra-large ore and bulk carriers were adapted from the supertanker designations very large crude carrier and ultra-large crude carrier.

== History ==
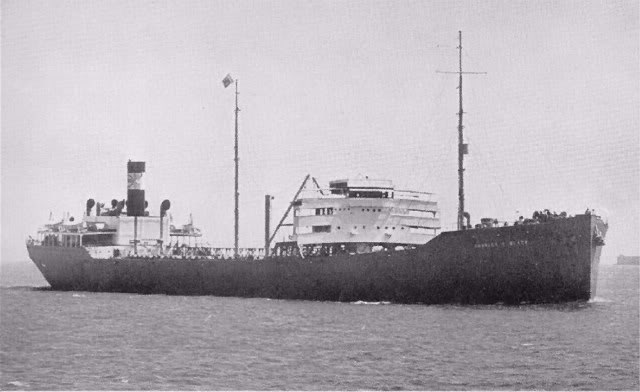
SS Venore in 1926 as Charles G. Black, which carried iron ore from Chile to Maryland

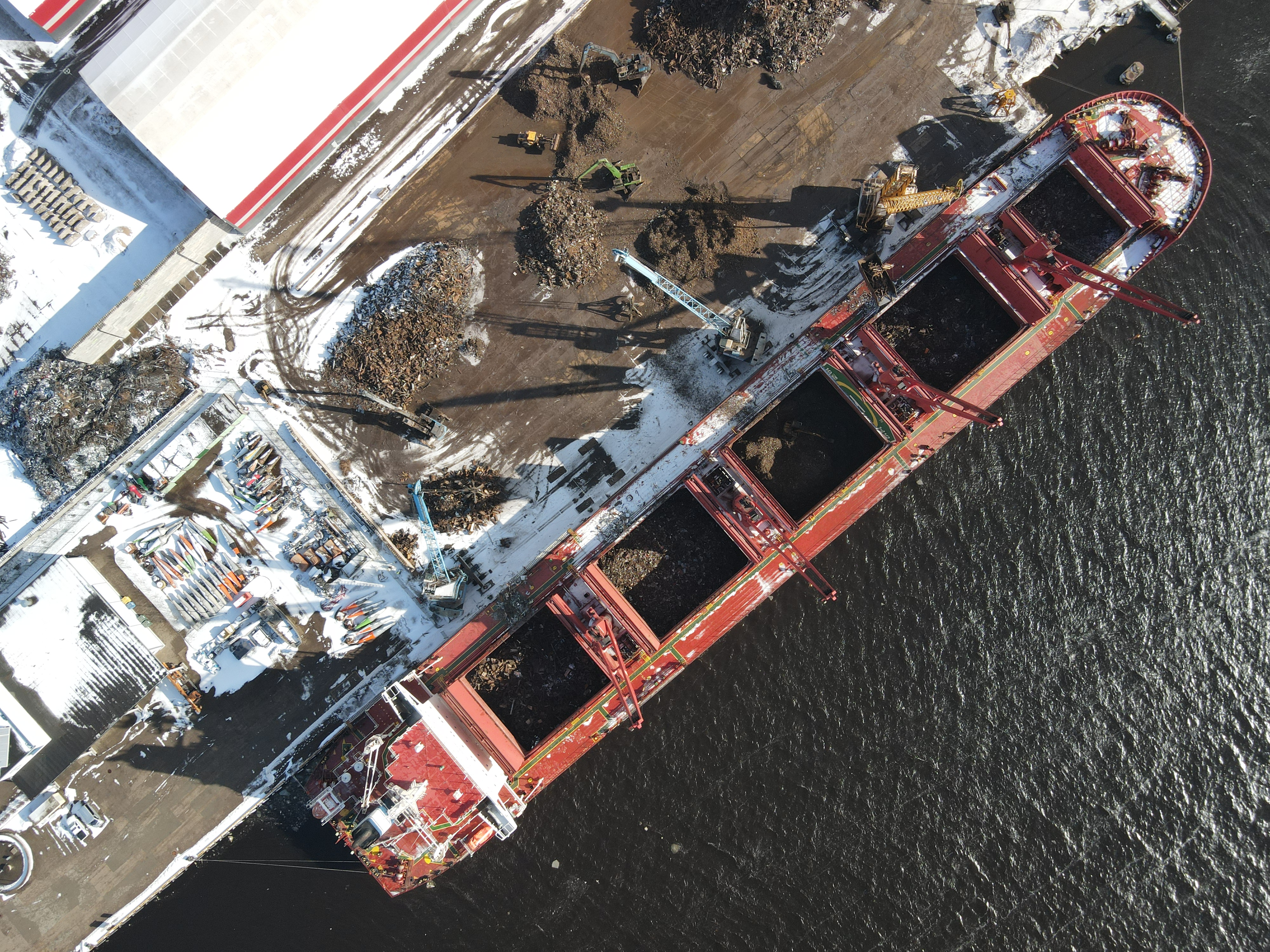
Bulk carrier ship

Before specialized bulk carriers were developed, shippers had two methods to move bulk goods by ship. In the first method, longshoremen loaded the cargo into sacks, stacked the sacks onto pallets, and put the pallets into the cargo hold with a crane. The second method required the shipper to charter an entire ship and spend time and money to build plywood bins into the holds. Then, to guide the cargo through the small hatches, wooden feeders and shifting boards had to be constructed. These methods were slow and labor-intensive. As with the container ship, the problem of efficient loading and unloading has driven the evolution of the bulk carrier.

Specialized bulk carriers began to appear as steam-powered ships became more popular. The first steam ship recognized as a bulk carrier was the British collier John Bowes, built in 1852. She featured a metal hull, a steam engine, and a ballasting system which used seawater instead of sandbags. These features helped her succeed in the competitive British coal market. The first self-unloader was the lake freighter Hennepin in 1902 on the Great Lakes. This greatly decreased the unloading time of bulk carriers by using a conveyor belt to move the cargo. The first bulk carriers with diesel propulsion began to appear in 1911.

Before World War II, the international shipping demand for bulk products was low—about 25 million tons for metal ores—and most of this trade was coastal. However, on the Great Lakes, bulk carriers hauled vast amounts of iron ore from Minnesota and Michigan's northern mines to the steel mills. In 1929, 73 million tons of iron ore was transported on the Lakes, and an almost equal amount of coal, limestone, and other products were also moved. Two defining characteristics of bulk carriers were already emerging: the double bottom, which was adopted in 1890, and the triangular structure of the ballast tanks, which was introduced in 1905. After World War II, an international bulk trade began to develop among industrialized nations, particularly between the European countries, the United States and Japan. Due to the economics of this trade, ocean bulk carriers became larger and more specialized. In this period, Great Lakes freighters increased in size, to maximize economies of scale, and self-unloaders became more common to cut turnaround time. The thousand-footers of the Great Lakes fleets, built in the 1970s, were among the longest ships afloat, and, in 1979, a record 214 million tons of bulk cargo were moved on the Great Lakes.

== Categories ==
=== Size categories ===
Major bulk carrier size categories
Name	Size in DWT	Ships	Traffic	New price	Used price
Handysize	10,000 to 35,000	34%	18%	$25M	$20M
Handymax	35,000 to 59,000	37%	18%	$25M	$20M
Panamax	60,000 to 80,000	19%	20%	$35M	$25M
Capesize	80,000 and over	10%	62%	$58M	$54M

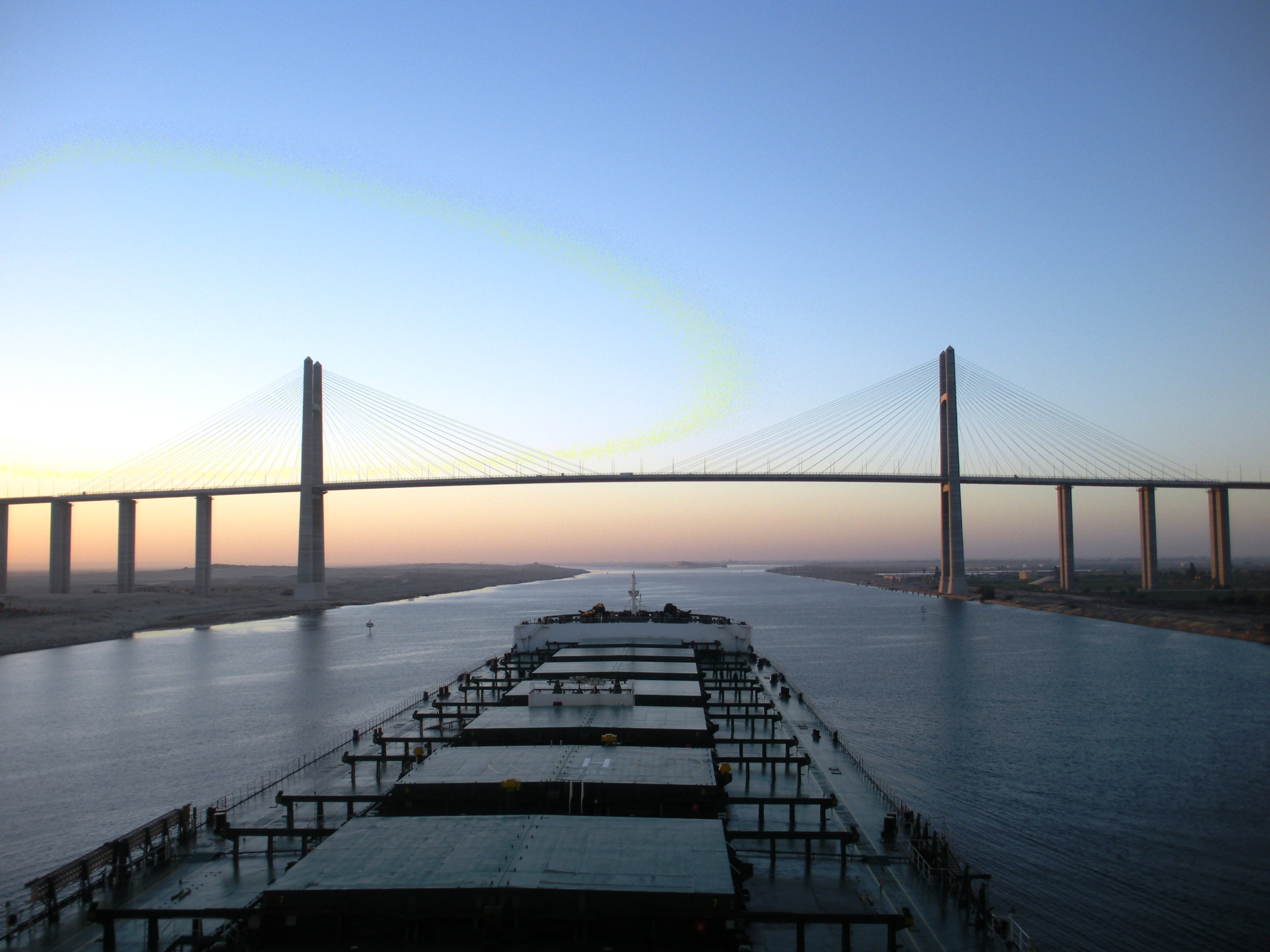
Post-deepening of the Suez Canal, a capesize bulk carrier approaches the Egyptian-Japanese Friendship Bridge

Bulk carriers are segregated into six major size categories: small, handysize, handymax, panamax, capesize, and very large. Very large bulk and ore carriers fall into the capesize category but are often considered separately.

==== Categories as per regions ====
Categories occur in regional trade, such as Kamsarmax, Seawaymax, Setouchmax, Dunkirkmax, and Newcastlemax.

- "Kamsarmax": Maximum length overall 229 meters refers to a new type of ship, larger than panamax, that is suitable for berthing at the Port of Kamsar (Republic of Guinea), where the major loading terminal of bauxite is restricted to vessels not more than 229 meters.
- "Newcastlemax": Maximum beam 50 meters, and maximum length overall of 300 meters Refers to the largest vessel able to enter the port of Newcastle, Australia at about 185,000 DWT
- "Setouchmax": About 203,000 DWT, being the largest vessels able to navigate the Setouchi Sea, Japan
- "Seawaymax": LOA 226 m max / 7.92 m draft. Refers to the largest vessel that can pass through the canal locks of the St. Lawrence Seaway (Great Lakes, Canada)
- "Malaccamax": LOA 330 m / 20 m draft / 300,000 DWT, Refers to the largest vessel that can pass through the Straits of Malacca.
- "Dunkirkmax": Maximum allowable beam = 45 m / LOA 289 m. max (175,000 DWT approx) for the eastern harbour lock in the Port of Dunkirk (France)

Mini-bulk carriers are prevalent in the category of small vessels with a capacity of under 10,000 DWT. Mini-bulk carriers carry from 500 to 2,500 tons, have a single hold, and are designed for river transport. They are often built to be able to pass under bridges and have small crews of three to eight people.

Handysize and Handymax ships are general purpose in nature. These two segments represent 71% of all bulk carriers over 10,000 DWT and also have the highest rate of growth. This is partly due to new regulations coming into effect which put greater constraints on the building of larger vessels. Handymax ships are typically 150–200 m in length and 52,000 – 58,000 DWT with five cargo holds and four cranes. These ships are also general purpose in nature.

The size of a Panamax vessel is limited by the Panama canal's lock chambers, which can accommodate ships with a beam of up to 32.31 m, a length overall of up to 294.13 m, and a draft of up to 12.04 m.

Capesize ships are too large to traverse the Panama canal and must round Cape Horn to travel between the Pacific and Atlantic oceans. Earlier, Capesize ships could not traverse the Suez and needed to go around the Cape of Good Hope. Recent deepening of the Suez canal to 66 ft (20 m) permits most Capesize ships to pass through it.

Capesize bulk carriers are specialized: 93% of their cargo is iron ore and coal. Some ships on the Great Lakes Waterway exceed Panamax dimensions but they are limited to use on the Great Lakes as they cannot pass through the smaller St. Lawrence Seaway to the ocean.

Very large ore carriers and very large bulk carriers are a subset of the capesize category reserved for vessels over 200,000 DWT. Carriers of this size are almost always designed to carry iron ore.

In October 2022, Mitsui O.S.K. Lines (MOL)'s bulk carrier Shofu Maru arrived in Newcastle on its maiden voyage, becoming the first bulk carrier to be partially powered by hard sail wind power propulsion technology. A five percent fuel savings was anticipated.

=== General types ===
General Bulk Carrier Types
Illustration	Description
	Geared bulk carriers are typically in the handysize to handymax size range although there are a small number of geared panamax vessels, like all bulk carriers they feature a series of holds covered by prominent hatch covers. They have cranes, derricks or conveyors that allow them to load or discharge cargo in ports without shore-based equipment. This gives geared bulk carriers flexibility in the cargoes they can carry and the routes they can travel. (Photo: A typical geared handysize bulk carrier.)
	Combined carriers are designed to transport both liquid and dry bulk cargoes. If both are carried simultaneously, they are segregated in separate holds and tanks. Combined carriers require special design and are expensive. They were prevalent in the 1970s, but their numbers have dwindled since 1990. (Photo: The oil pipeline and dry bulk hold aboard Maya.)
	Gearless carriers are bulk carriers without cranes or conveyors. These ships depend on shore-based equipment at their ports of call for loading and discharging. They range across all sizes, the larger bulk carriers (VLOCs) can only dock at the largest ports, some of these are designed with a single port-to-port trade in mind. The use of gearless bulk carriers avoids the costs of installing, operating, and maintaining cranes. (Photo: Berge Athen, a 225,000-ton DWT gearless bulk carrier.)
	Self-dischargers are bulk carriers with conveyor belts, or with the use of an excavator that is fitted on a traverse running over the vessel's entire hatch, and that is able to move sideways as well. This allows them to discharge their cargo quickly and efficiently. (Photo: John B. Aird a self-discharging lake freighter.)
	Lakers are the bulk carriers prominent on the Great Lakes, often identifiable by having a forward house that helps in transiting locks. Operating in fresh water, these ships suffer much less corrosion damage and have a much longer lifespan than saltwater ships. As of 2005, there were 98 lakers of 10,000 DWT or over. (Photo: Edward L. Ryerson, a Great Lakes bulk carrier.)
	BIBO or "Bulk In, Bags Out" bulk carriers are equipped to bag cargo as it is unloaded. CHL Innovator, shown in the photo, is a BIBO bulk carrier. In one hour, this ship can unload 300 tons of bulk sugar and package it into 50 kg sacks.
	Open hatch bulk carriers, often referred to as OHBCs or conbulkers, are specialized bulk carriers designed to offer direct access to the hold through cargo hatches which extend the full width of the vessel. As a result, large cargo units can be lowered into place. If it is possible, the holds or hatches are designed around standard cargo unit sizes. Sometimes gantry cranes are fitted. There is special attention for cargo-handling shipping gear. (Photo: MV Star Osakana, a 45,000-ton DWT open hatch bulk carrier.)

== Fleet characteristics ==
Growth of bulk carrier deadweight tonnage in green and percentage of bulk carriers to the entire fleet in red, from 1977 to 1999

The world's bulk transport has reached immense proportions: in 2005, 1.7 billion metric tons of coal, iron ore, grain, bauxite, and phosphate was transported by ship. Today, the world's bulk carrier fleet includes 6,225 ships of over 10,000 DWT, and represent 40% of all ships in terms of tonnage and 39.4% in terms of vessels. Including smaller ships, bulk carriers have a total combined capacity of almost 346 million DWT. Combined carriers are a very small portion of the fleet, representing less than 3% of this capacity. The lake freighters of the Great Lakes, with 98 ships of 3.2 million total DWT, despite forming a small fraction of the total fleet by tonnage and only operating 10 months a year, carried a tenth of the world's bulk cargo because of the short trip distance and fast turnarounds.

As of 2005, the average bulk carrier was just over 13 years old. About 41% of all bulk carriers were less than ten years old, 33% were over twenty years old, and the remaining 26% were between ten and twenty years of age. All of the 98 bulk carriers registered in the Great Lakes trade are over 20 years old and the oldest still sailing in 2009, the St. Mary's Challenger, was 106 years old.

Bulk carriers by flag state (source data)

=== Flag states ===
As of 2005, the United States Maritime Administration counted 6,225 bulk carriers of 10,000 DWT or greater worldwide. More bulk carriers are registered in Panama, with 1,703 ships, more than any four other flag states combined. In terms of the number of bulk carriers registered, the top five flag states also include Hong Kong with 492 ships, Malta (435), Cyprus (373), and China (371). Panama also dominates bulk carrier registration in terms of deadweight tonnage. Positions two through five are held by Hong Kong, Greece, Malta, and Cyprus.

=== Largest fleets ===
Greece, Japan, and China are the top three owners of bulk carriers, with 1,326, 1,041, and 979 vessels respectively. These three nations account for over 53% of the world's fleet.

Several companies have large private bulk carrier fleets. The multinational company Gearbulk Holding Ltd. has over 70 bulk carriers. The Fednav Group in Canada operates a fleet of over 80 bulk carriers, including two designed to work in Arctic ice. Croatia's Atlantska Plovidba d.d. has a fleet of 14 bulk carriers. The H. Vogemann Group in Hamburg, Germany operates a fleet of 19 bulk carriers. Portline in Portugal, owns 10 bulk carriers. Dampskibsselskabet Torm in Denmark and Elcano in Spain also own notable bulk carrier fleets. Other companies specialize in mini-bulk carrier operations: England's Stephenson Clarke Shipping Limited owns a fleet of eight mini-bulk carriers and five small Handysize bulk carriers, and Cornships Management and Agency Inc. in Turkey owns a fleet of seven mini-bulk carriers.

=== Builders ===
Asian companies dominate the construction of bulk carriers. Of the world's 6,225 bulk carriers, almost 62% were built in Japan by shipyards such as Oshima Shipbuilding and Sanoyas Hishino Meisho. South Korea, with notable shipyards Daewoo and Hyundai Heavy Industries, ranked second among builders, with 643 ships. The People's Republic of China, with large shipyards such as Dalian, Chengxi, and Shanghai Waigaoqiao, ranked third, with 509 ships. Taiwan, with shipyards such as China Shipbuilding Corporation, ranked fourth, accounting for 129 ships. Shipyards in these top four countries built over 82% of the bulk carriers afloat.

=== Freight charges ===
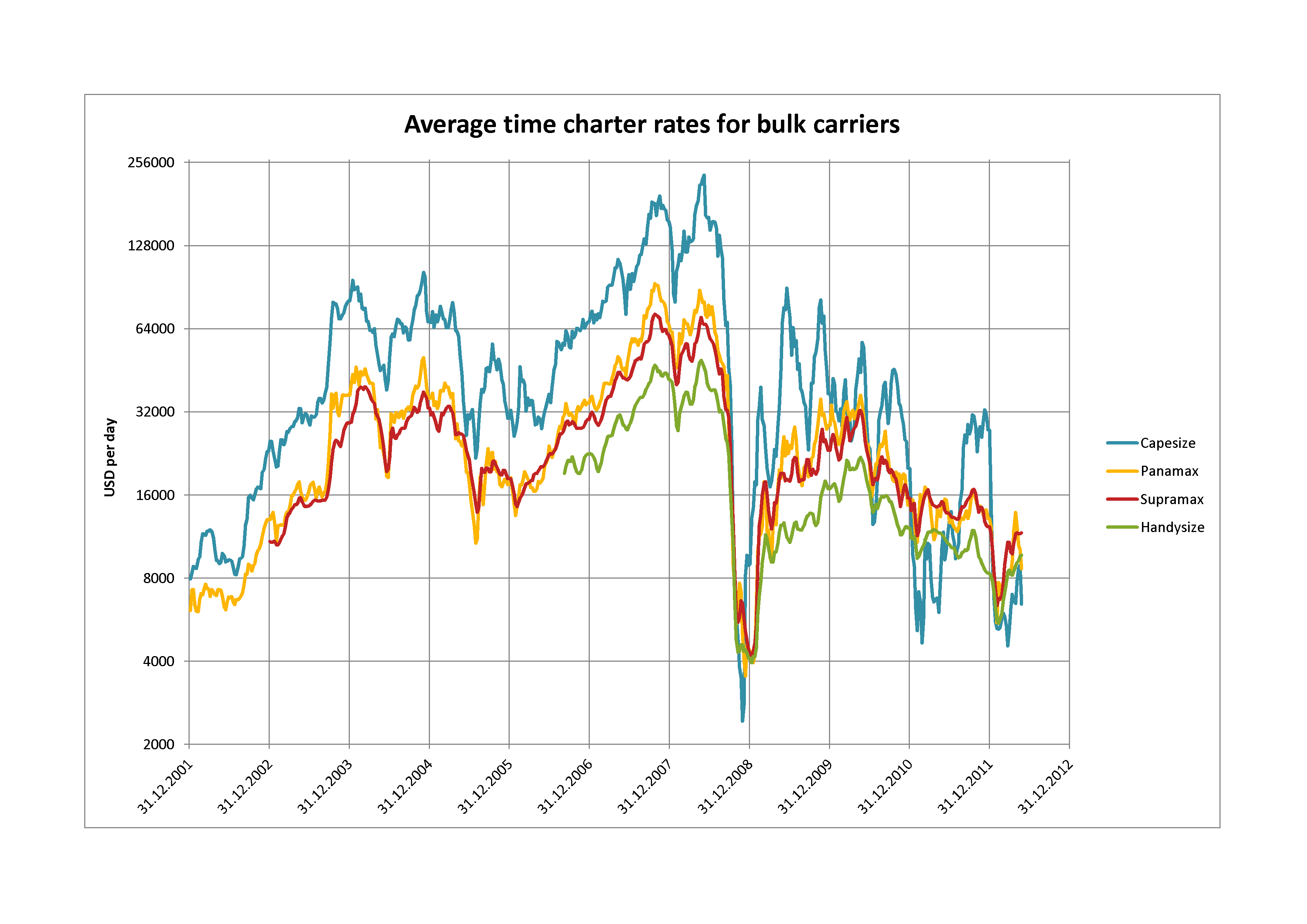
Average time charter rates for bulk carriers

Several factors affect the cost to move a bulk cargo by ship. The bulk freight market is very volatile, with the type of cargo, size of the vessel, and the route traveled all affecting the final price. Moving a capesize load of coal from South America to Europe cost anywhere from $15 to $25 per ton in 2005. Hauling a panamax-sized load of aggregate materials from the Gulf of Mexico to Japan that year could cost as little as $40 per ton to as much as $70 per ton.

Some shippers choose instead to charter a ship, paying a daily rate instead of a set price per ton. In 2005, the average daily rate for a Handymax ship varied between $18,000 – $30,000. A Panamax ship could be chartered for $20,000 – $50,000 per day, and a Capesize for $40,000 – $70,000 per day.

=== Ship breaking ===
Generally, ships are removed from the fleet by going through a process known as ship breaking or scrapping. Ship-owners and buyers negotiate scrap prices based on factors such as the ship's empty weight (called light ton displacement or LDT) and prices in the scrap metal market. In 1998, almost 700 ships were scrapped in places like Alang, India and Chittagong, Bangladesh. This is often done by 'beaching' the ship on open sand, then cutting it apart by hand with gas torches, a dangerous operation that results in injuries and fatalities, as well as exposure to toxic materials such as asbestos, lead, and various chemicals. Half a million deadweight tons worth of bulk carriers were scrapped in 2004, accounting for 4.7% of the year's scrapping. That year, bulk carriers fetched particularly high scrap prices, between $340 and $350 per LDT.

== Operation ==
=== Crew ===
Typical bulk carrier crew
Captain/Master
Deck department	Engine department	Steward's department
1 Chief mate 1 Second mate 1 Third mate 1 Boatswain; 1 Deck cadet 2–6 Able seamen 0–2 Ordinary seamen	1 Chief engineer 1 Second engineer 1 Third engineer 1–2 Fourth engineers 0–1 ETO; 0–2 Motormen; 1–3 Oilers; 0–3 Greasers; 1–3 Wipers	1 Chief steward 1 Chief cook 1 Steward's assistant

The crew on a bulk carrier typically consists of 20 to 30 people, though smaller ships can be handled by 8. The crew includes the captain or master, the deck department, the engine department, and the steward's department. The practice of taking passengers aboard cargo ships, once almost universal, is very rare today and almost non-existent on bulk carriers.

During the 1990s, bulk carriers were involved in an alarming number of shipwrecks. This led ship-owners to commission a study seeking to explain the effect of various factors on the crew's effectiveness and competence. The study showed that crew performance aboard bulk carriers was the lowest of all groups studied. Among bulk carrier crews, the best performance was found aboard younger and larger ships. Crews on better-maintained ships performed better, as did crews on ships where fewer languages were spoken.

Fewer deck officers are employed on bulk carriers than on similarly sized ships of other types. A mini-bulk carrier carries two to three deck officers, while larger Handysize and Capesize bulk carriers carry four. Liquid natural gas tankers of the same size have an additional deck officer and unlicensed mariner.

=== Voyages ===
A bulk carrier's voyages are determined by market forces; routes and cargoes often vary. A ship may engage in the grain trade during the harvest season and later move on to carry other cargoes or work on a different route. Aboard a coastal carrier in the tramp trade, the crew will often not know the next port of call until the cargo is fully loaded.

Because bulk cargo is so difficult to discharge, bulk carriers spend more time in port than other ships. A study of mini-bulk carriers found that it takes, on average, twice as much time to unload a ship as it does to load it. A mini-bulk carrier spends 55 hours at a time in port, compared to 35 hours for a lumber carrier of similar size. This time in port increases to 74 hours for Handymax and 120 hours for Panamax vessels. Compared with the 12-hour turnarounds common for container ships, 15-hour turnarounds for car carriers, and 26-hour turnarounds for large tankers, bulk carrier crews have more opportunities to spend time ashore.

=== Loading and unloading ===
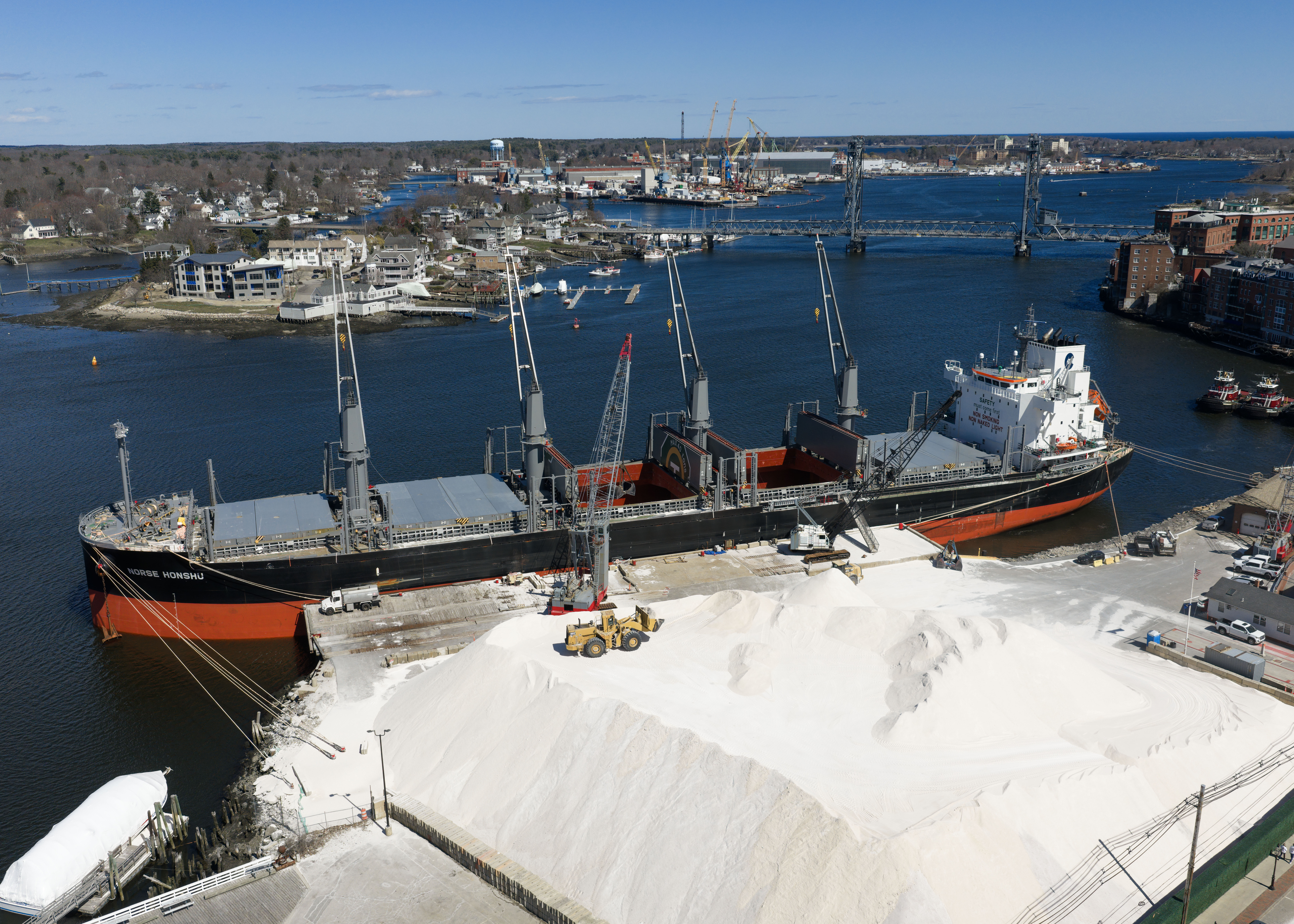
Bulk carrier unloading road salt in Portsmouth, New Hampshire

Loading and unloading a bulk carrier is time-consuming and dangerous. The process is planned by the ship's chief mate under the direct and continued supervision of ship's captain. International regulations require that the captain and terminal master agree on a detailed plan before operations begin. Deck officers and stevedores oversee the operations. Occasionally loading errors are made that cause a ship to capsize or break in half at the pier.

The loading method used depends on both the cargo and the equipment available on the ship and on the dock. In the least advanced ports, cargo can be loaded with shovels or bags poured from the hatch cover. This system is being replaced with faster, less labor-intensive methods. Double-articulation cranes, which can load at a rate of 1,000 tons per hour, represent a widely used method, and the use of shore-based gantry cranes, reaching 2,000 tons per hour, is growing. A crane's discharge rate is limited by the bucket's capacity (from 6 to 40 tons) and by the speed at which the crane can take a load, deposit it at the terminal and return to take the next. For modern gantry cranes, the total time of the grab-deposit-return cycle is about 50 seconds.

Conveyor belts offer a very efficient method of loading, with standard loading rates varying between 100 and 700 tons per hour, although the most advanced ports can offer rates of 16,000 tons per hour. Start-up and shutdown procedures with conveyor belts, though, are complicated and require time to carry out. Self-discharging ships use conveyor belts with load rates of around 1,000 tons per hour.

Once the cargo is discharged, the crew begins to clean the holds. This is particularly important if the next cargo is of a different type. The immense size of cargo holds and the tendency of cargoes to be physically irritating add to the difficulty of cleaning the holds. When the holds are clean, the process of loading begins.

It is crucial to keep the cargo level during loading in order to maintain stability. As the hold is filled, machines such as excavators and bulldozers are often used to keep the cargo in check. Leveling is particularly important when the hold is only partly full, since cargo is more likely to shift. Extra precautions are taken, such as adding longitudinal divisions and securing wood atop the cargo. If a hold is full, a technique called tomming is used, which involves digging out a 6 feet (2 m) hole below the hatch cover and filling it with bagged cargo or weights.

A typical bulk carrier offload

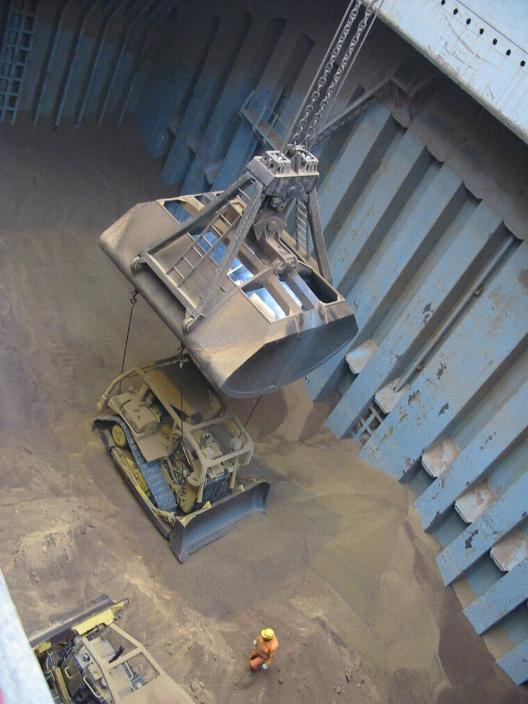
1. A bulldozer is loaded into the hold.

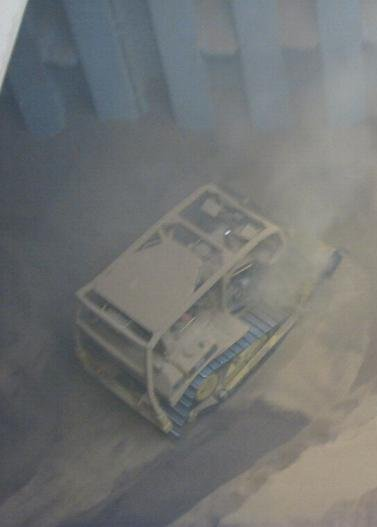
2. The bulldozer pushes cargo to the center of the hold.

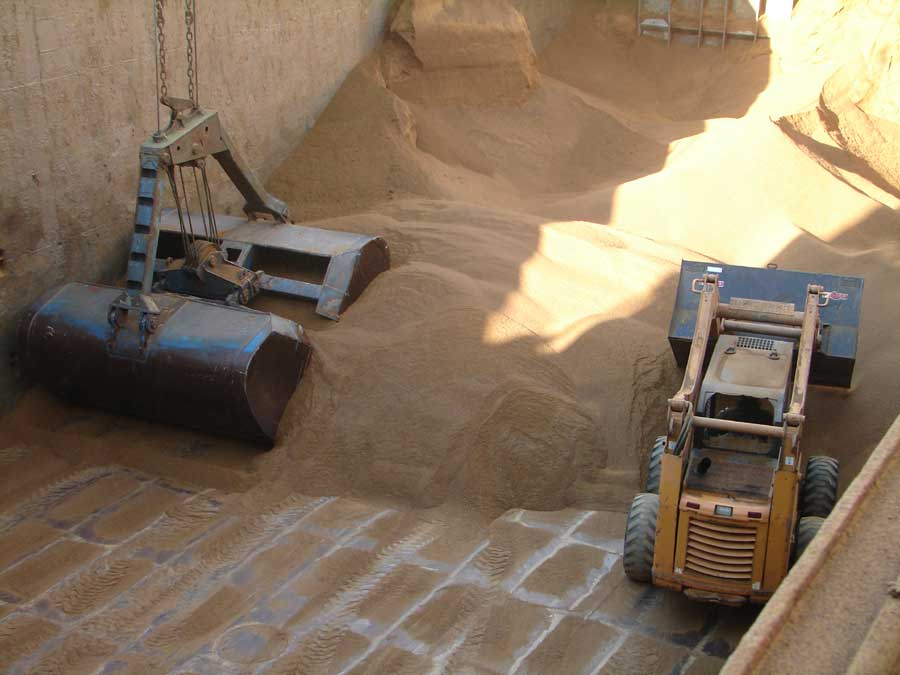
3. The gantry crane picks up the cargo.

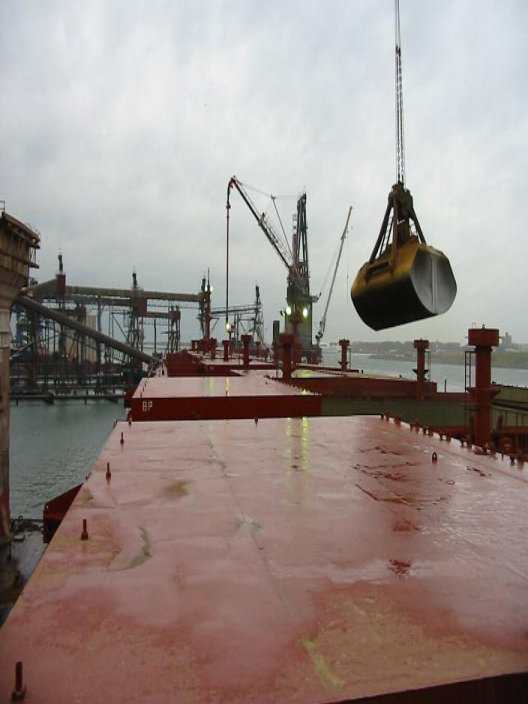
4. The gantry crane removes the cargo from the ship.

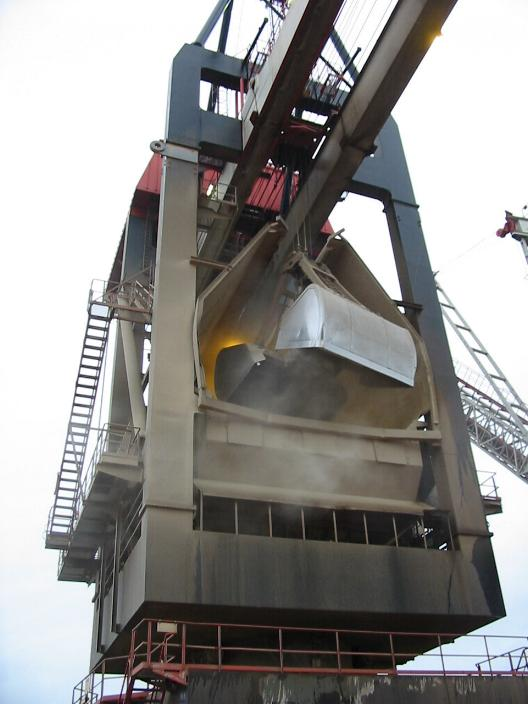
5. The gantry crane moves the cargo to a bin on the pier.

== Architecture ==
A bulk carrier's design is largely defined by the cargo it will carry. The cargo's density, also known as its stowage factor, is the key factor. Densities for common bulk cargoes vary from 0.6 tons per cubic meter for light grains to 3 tons per cubic meter for iron ore.

The overall cargo weight is the limiting factor in the design of an ore carrier, since the cargo is so dense. Coal carriers, on the other hand, are limited by overall volume, since most bulk carriers can be completely filled with coal before reaching their maximum draft.

For a given tonnage, the second factor which governs the ship's dimensions is the size of the ports and waterways it will travel to. For example, a vessel that will pass the Panama Canal will be limited in its beam and draft. For most designs, the ratio of length-to-width ranges between 5 and 7, with an average of 6.2. The ratio of length-to-height will be between 11 and 12.

=== Machinery ===
bulk carrier architectural plans

Line plan of a 1990 Capesize ore carrier

Typical midship section of a bulk carrier with a single hull and double bottom

The engine room on a bulk carrier is usually near the stern, under the superstructure. Larger bulk carriers, from Handymax up, usually have a single two-stroke low-speed crosshead diesel engine directly coupled to a fixed-pitch propeller. Electricity is produced by auxiliary generators and/or an alternator coupled to the propeller shaft. On the smaller bulk carriers, one or two four-stroke diesels are used to turn either a fixed or controllable-pitch propeller via a reduction gearbox, which may also incorporate an output for an alternator. The average design ship speed for bulk carriers of Handysize and above is 13.5–15 knots (25.0–27.8 km/h; 15.5–17.3 mph). The propeller speed is relatively low, at about 90 revolutions per minute, although it depends on the size of the propeller.

As a result of the 1973 oil crisis, the 1979 energy crisis, and the resulting rise in oil prices, experimental designs using coal to fuel ships were tested in the late 1970s and early 1980s. The Australian National Lines (ANL) constructed two 74,700-ton coal-burner ships called River Boyne and River Embely, along with two constructed by TNT called TNT Capricornia and TNT Carpentaria and renamed Fitzroy River and Endeavor River. These ships were financially effective for the duration of their lives, and their steam engines were able to generate a shaft-power of 19,000 horsepower (14,000 kW). This strategy gave an interesting advantage to carriers of bauxite and similar fuel cargoes, but suffered from poor engine yield compared to higher maintenance cost and efficient modern diesels, maintenance problems due to the supply of ungraded coal, and high initial costs.

=== Hatches ===
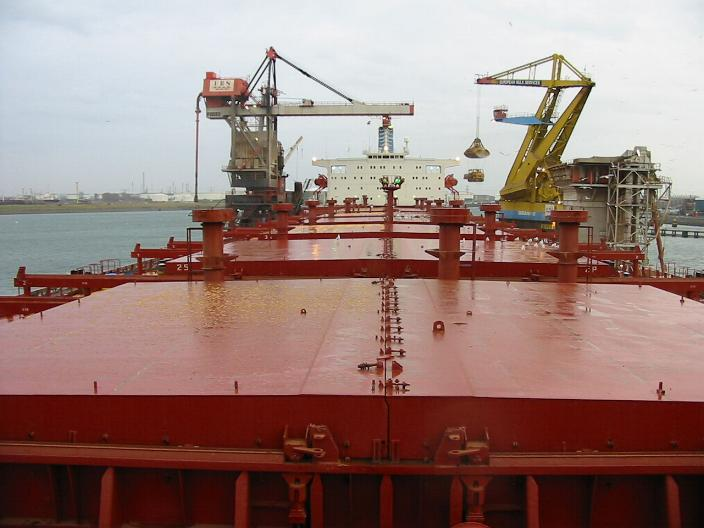
The sliding hatchcovers of Zaira

A hatch or hatchway is the opening at the top of a cargo hold. The mechanical devices which allow hatches to be opened and closed are called hatch cover. In general, hatch covers are between 45% and 60% of the ship's breadth, or beam, and 57% to 67% of the length of the holds. To efficiently load and unload cargo, hatches must be large, but large hatches present structural problems. Hull stress is concentrated around the edges of the hatches, and these areas must be reinforced. Often, hatch areas are reinforced by locally increasing the scantlings or by adding structural members called stiffeners. Both of these options have the undesired effect of adding weight to the ship.

As recently as the 1950s, hatches had wooden covers that would be broken apart and rebuilt by hand, rather than opened and closed. Newer vessels have hydraulic-operated metal hatch covers that can often be operated by one person. Hatch covers can slide forwards, backwards, or to the side, lift up or fold up. It is essential that the hatch covers be watertight: unsealed hatches lead to accidental cargo hold flooding, which has caused many bulk carriers to sink.

Regulations regarding hatch covers have evolved since the investigation following the loss of the MV Derbyshire. The Load Line Conference of 1966 imposed a requirement that hatch covers be able to withstand load of 1.74 tons/m^{2} due to sea water, and a minimum scantling of 6 mm for the tops of the hatch covers. The International Association of Classification Societies then increased this strength standard by creating its Unified Requirement S21 in 1998. This standard requires that the pressure due to sea water be calculated as a function of freeboard and speed, especially for hatch covers located on the forward portion of the ship.

=== Hull ===
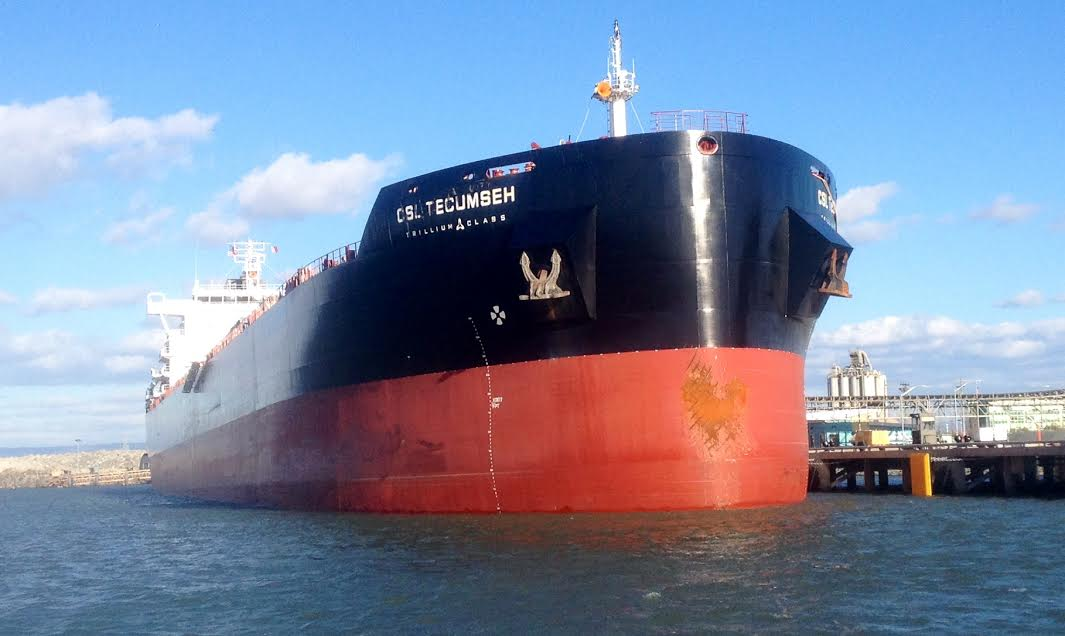
Unloaded Trillium-class dry bulk carrier at the Port of Redwood City

Bulk carriers are designed to be easy to build and to store cargo efficiently. To facilitate construction, bulk carriers are built with a single hull curvature. Also, while a bulbous bow allows a ship to move more efficiently through the water, designers lean towards simple vertical bows on larger ships. Full hulls, with large block coefficients, are almost universal, and as a result, bulk carriers are inherently slow. This is offset by their efficiency. Comparing a ship's carrying capacity in terms of deadweight tonnage to its weight when empty is one way to measure its efficiency. A small Handymax ship can carry five times its weight. In larger designs, this efficiency is even more pronounced: Capesize vessels can carry more than eight times their weight.

Bulk carriers have a cross-section typical of most merchant ships. The upper and lower corners of the hold are used as ballast tanks, as is the double bottom area. The corner tanks are reinforced and serve another purpose besides controlling the ship's trim. Designers choose the angle of the corner tanks to be less than that of the angle of repose of the anticipated cargoes. This greatly reduces side-to-side movement, or "shifting," of cargo which can endanger the ship.

The double bottoms are also subject to design constraints. The primary concern is that they be high enough to allow the passage of pipes and cables. These areas must also be roomy enough to allow people safe access to perform surveys and maintenance. On the other hand, concerns of excess weight and wasted volume keep the double bottoms very tight spaces.

Bulk carrier hulls are made of steel, usually mild steel. Some manufacturers have preferred high-tensile steel recently in order to reduce the tare weight. However, the use of high-tensile steel for longitudinal and transverse reinforcements can reduce the hull's rigidity and resistance to corrosion. Forged steel is used for some ship parts, such as the propeller shaft support. Transverse partitions are made of corrugated iron, reinforced at the bottom and at connections. The construction of bulk carrier hulls using a concrete-steel sandwich has been investigated.

Double hulls have become popular in the past ten years. Designing a vessel with double sides adds primarily to its breadth, since bulk carriers are already required to have double bottoms. One of the advantages of the double hull is to make room to place all the structural elements in the sides, removing them from the holds. This increases the volume of the holds, and simplifies their structure which helps in loading, unloading, and cleaning. Double sides also improve a ship's capacity for ballasting, which is useful when carrying light goods: the ship may have to increase its draft for stability or seakeeping reasons, which is done by adding ballast water.

A recent design, called Hy-Con, seeks to combine the strengths of single-hull and double-hull construction. Short for Hybrid Configuration, this design doubles the forward-most and rear-most holds and leaves the others single-hulled. This approach increases the ship's solidity at key points, while reducing the overall tare weight.

Since the adoption of double hull has been more of an economic than a purely architectural decision, some argue that double-sided ships receive fewer comprehensive surveys and suffer more from hidden corrosion. In spite of opposition, double hulls became a requirement for Panamax and Capesize vessels in 2005.

Freighters are in continual danger of "breaking their backs" and thus longitudinal strength is a primary architectural concern. A naval architect uses the correlation between longitudinal strength and a set of hull thicknesses called scantlings to manage problems of longitudinal strength and stresses. A ship's hull is composed of individual parts called members. The set of dimensions of these members is called the ship's scantlings. Naval architects calculate the stresses a ship can be expected to be subjected to, add in safety factors, and then can calculate the required scantlings.

These analyses are conducted when traveling empty, loading and unloading, when partially and fully loaded, and under conditions of temporary overloading. Places subject to the largest stresses are studied carefully, such as hold-bottoms, hatch-covers, bulkheads between holds, and the bottoms of ballast tanks. Great Lakes bulk carriers also must be designed to withstand springing, or developing resonance with the waves, which can cause fatigue fractures.

Since 1 April 2006, the International Association of Classification Societies has adopted the Common Structural Rules. The rules apply to bulk carriers more than 90 meters in length and require that scantlings' calculations take into account items such as the effect of corrosion, the harsh conditions often found in the North Atlantic, and dynamic stresses during loading. The rules also establish margins for corrosion, from 0.5 to 0.9 mm.

== Safety ==
The 1980s and 1990s were a very unsafe time for bulk carriers. Many bulk carriers sank during this time; 99 were lost between 1990 and 1997 alone. Most of these sinkings were sudden and quick, making it impossible for the crew to escape: more than 650 sailors were lost during this same period. Due partly to the sinking of MV Derbyshire, a series of international safety resolutions regarding bulk carriers were adopted during the 1990s.

=== Stability problems ===
Cargo shifting poses a great danger for bulk carriers. The problem is even more pronounced with grain cargoes, since grain settles during a voyage and creates extra space between the top of the cargo and the top of the hold. Cargo is then free to move from one side of the ship to the other as the ship rolls. This can cause the ship to list, which, in turn, causes more cargo to shift. This kind of chain reaction can capsize a bulk carrier very quickly.

The 1960 SOLAS Convention sought to control this sort of problem. These regulations required the upper ballast tanks designed in a manner to prevent shifting. They also required cargoes to be leveled, or trimmed, using excavators in the holds. The practice of trimming reduces the amount of the cargo's surface area in contact with air which has a useful side-effect: reducing the chances of spontaneous combustion in cargoes such as coal, iron, and metal shavings.

Another sort of risk that can affect dry cargoes is absorption of ambient moisture. When very fine concretes and aggregates mix with water, the mud created at the bottom of the hold shifts easily and can produce a free surface effect. The only way to control these risks is by good ventilation practices and careful monitoring for the presence of water.

The International Maritime Organization sets out international standards and codes for the safe stowage and transportation of bulk carrier cargoes. These include the International Maritime Solid Bulk Cargoes Code, the International Code for the Safe Carriage of Grain in Bulk and the Code of Safe Practice for Ships Carrying Timber Deck Cargoes.

=== Structural problems ===
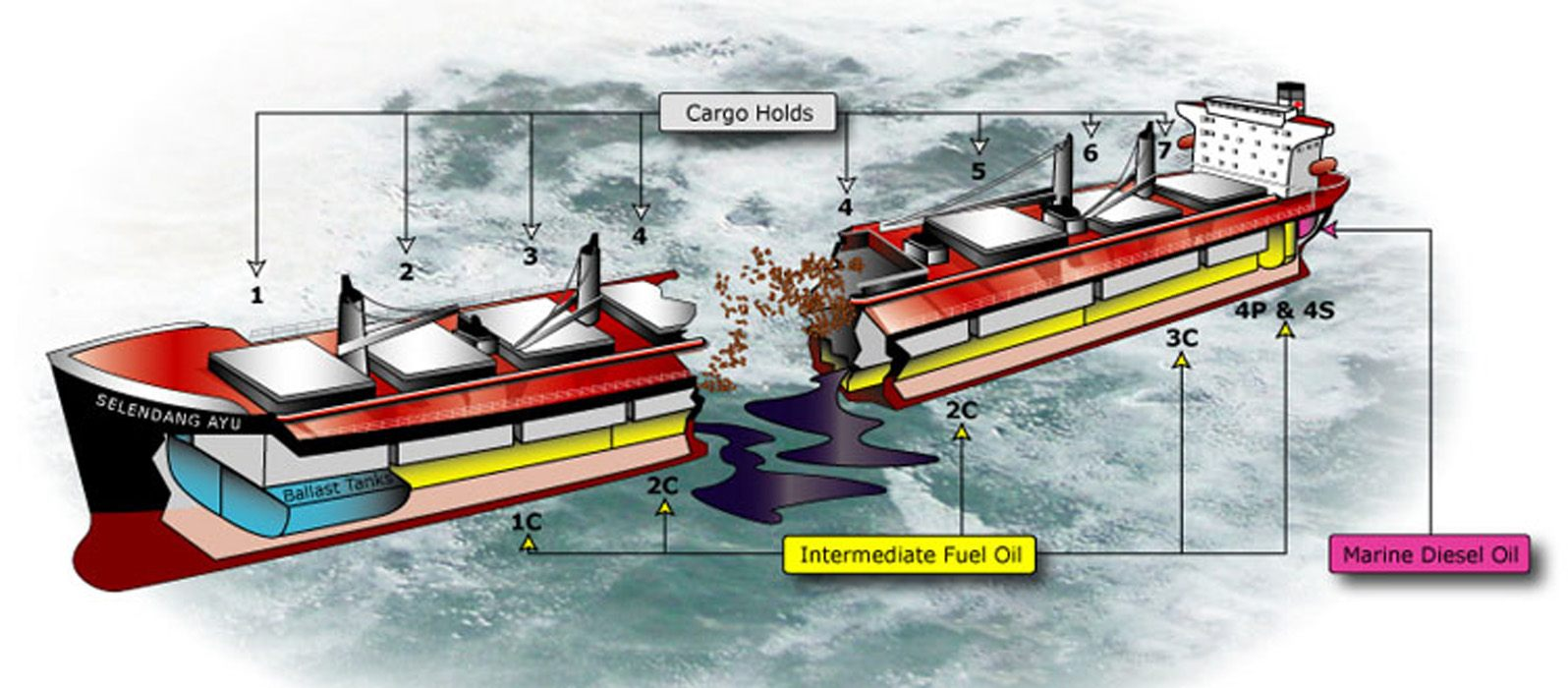
Diagram showing the wreck of Selendang Ayu, and the double-bottom tank leaks

In 1990 alone, 20 bulk carriers sank, taking with them 94 crewmen. In 1991, 24 bulk carriers sank, killing 154. This level of loss focused attention on the safety aspects of bulk carriers, and a great deal was learned. The American Bureau of Shipping concluded that the losses were "directly traceable to failure of the cargo hold structure" and Lloyd's Register of Shipping added that the hull sides could not withstand "the combination of local corrosion, fatigue cracking and operational damage."

The accident studies showed a clear pattern:

1. Sea water enters the forward hatch, due to a large wave, a poor seal, corrosion, etc.
2. The extra water weight in hold number one compromises the partition to hold number two,
3. Water enters hold number two and alters the trim so much that more water enters the holds
4. With two holds rapidly filling with water, the bow submerges, and the ship quickly sinks, leaving little time for the crew to react.

Previous practices had required ships to withstand the flooding of a single forward hold but did not guard against situations where two holds would flood. The case where two after (rear) holds are flooded is no better, because the engine room is quickly flooded, leaving the ship without propulsion. If two holds in the middle of the ship are flooded, the stress on the hull can become so great that the ship snaps in two.

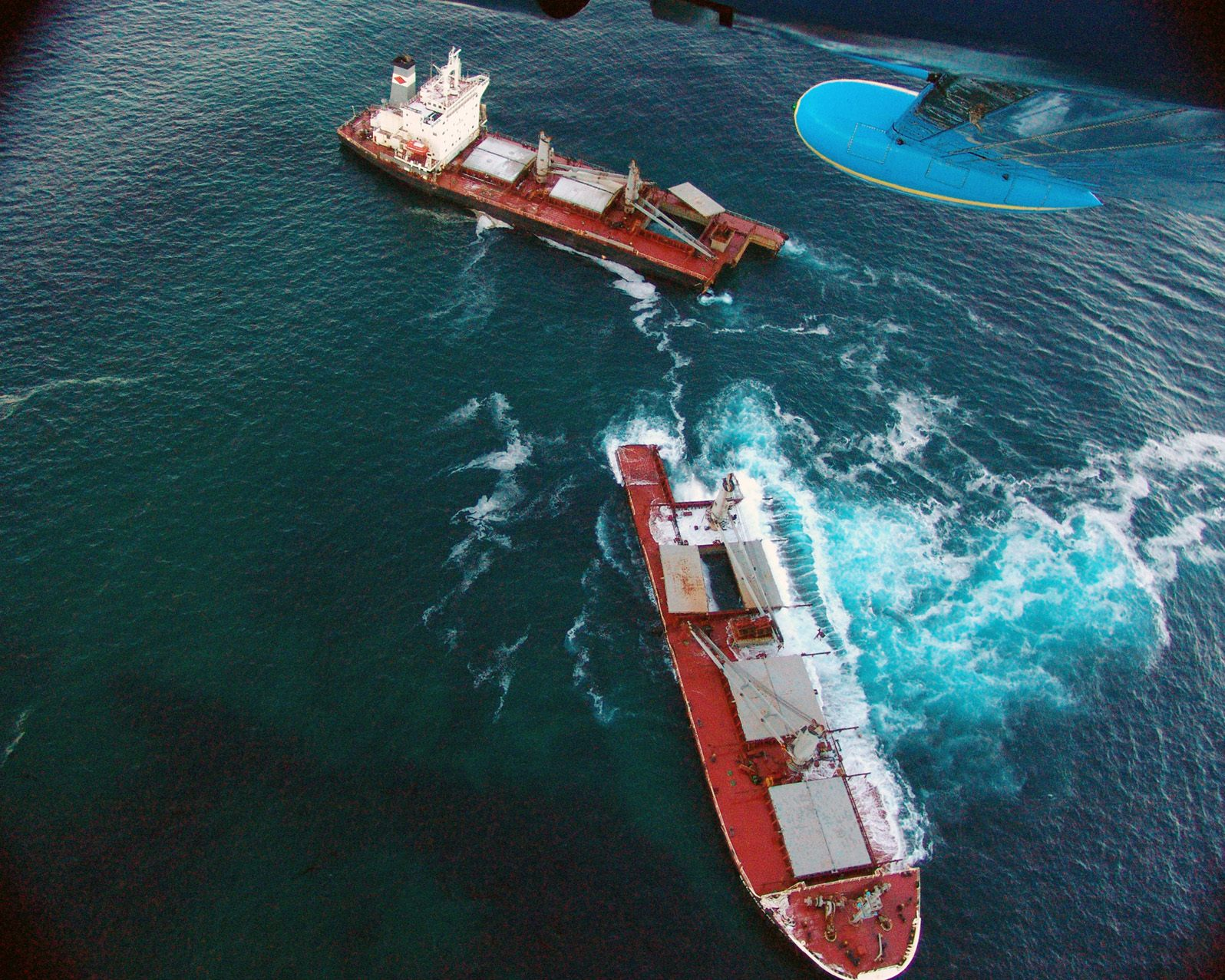
Selendang Ayu suffered a catastrophic fracture in number 4 hold in December 2004

Other contributing factors were identified:

- Most shipwrecks involved ships over 20 years in age. A glut of ships of this age occurred in the 1980s, caused by an overestimate of the growth of international trade. Rather than replace them prematurely, shipping companies were compelled on cost grounds to keep their aging vessels in service.
- Corrosion, due to a lack of maintenance, affected the seals of the hatch covers and the strength of the bulkheads which separate holds. The corrosion is difficult to detect due to the immense size of the surfaces involved.
- Advanced methods of loading were not foreseen when the ships were designed. While the new processes are more efficient, loading is more difficult to control (it can take over an hour just to halt the operation), occasionally resulting in overloading the ship. These unexpected shocks, over time, can damage the hull's structural integrity.
- Recent use of high-tensile steel allows building a structure with less material and weight while retaining similar strength. However, because it is thinner than regular steel, HT steel can corrode more easily, plus it can develop metal fatigue in choppy seas.
- According to Lloyd's Register, a principal cause of sinkings was the attitude of ship-owners, who sent ships with known problems to sea.

The new rules adopted in the 1997 annexes to the SOLAS convention focused on problems such as reinforcing bulkheads and the longitudinal frame, more stringent inspections (with a particular focus on corrosion) and routine in-port inspections. The 1997 additions also required bulk carriers with restrictions (for instance, forbidden from carrying certain types of cargoes) to mark their hulls with large, easy-to-see triangles.

=== Crew safety ===
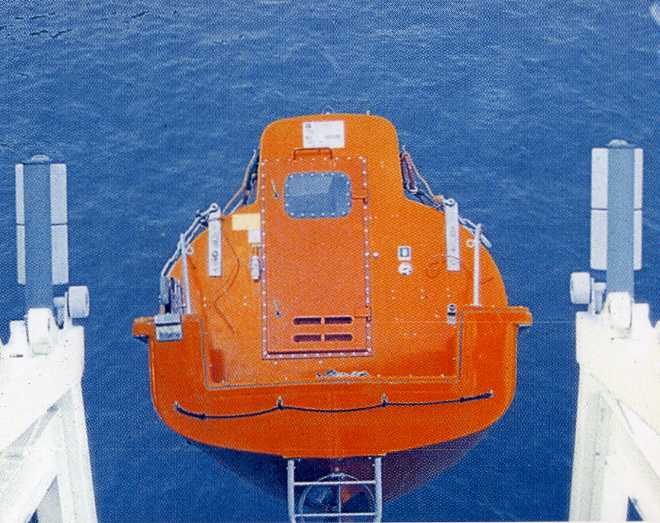
Launch of a free-fall lifeboat

Since December 2004, Panamax and Capesize bulk carriers have been required to carry free-fall lifeboats located on the stern, behind the deckhouse. This arrangement allows the crew to abandon ship quickly in case of a catastrophic emergency. One argument against the use of free-fall lifeboats is that the evacuees require "some degree of physical mobility, even fitness" to enter and launch the boat. Also, injuries have occurred during launches, for example, in the case of incorrectly secured safety belts.

In December 2002, Chapter XII of the SOLAS convention was amended to require the installation of high-level water alarms and monitoring systems on all bulk carriers. This safety measure quickly alerts watch standers on the bridge and in the engine room in case of flooding in the holds. In cases of catastrophic flooding, these detectors could speed the process of abandoning ship.

== See also ==
- Berge Stahl, the largest bulk carrier from 1986 until 2011
- Bright Field
- Edmund Fitzgerald
- Flare
- Lake Illawarra
- New Carissa
- Ore Brasil, the largest bulk carrier in service
- Paul R. Tregurtha, the largest bulk carrier on the Great Lakes
- Sygna
