= Handymax =

Ship size class

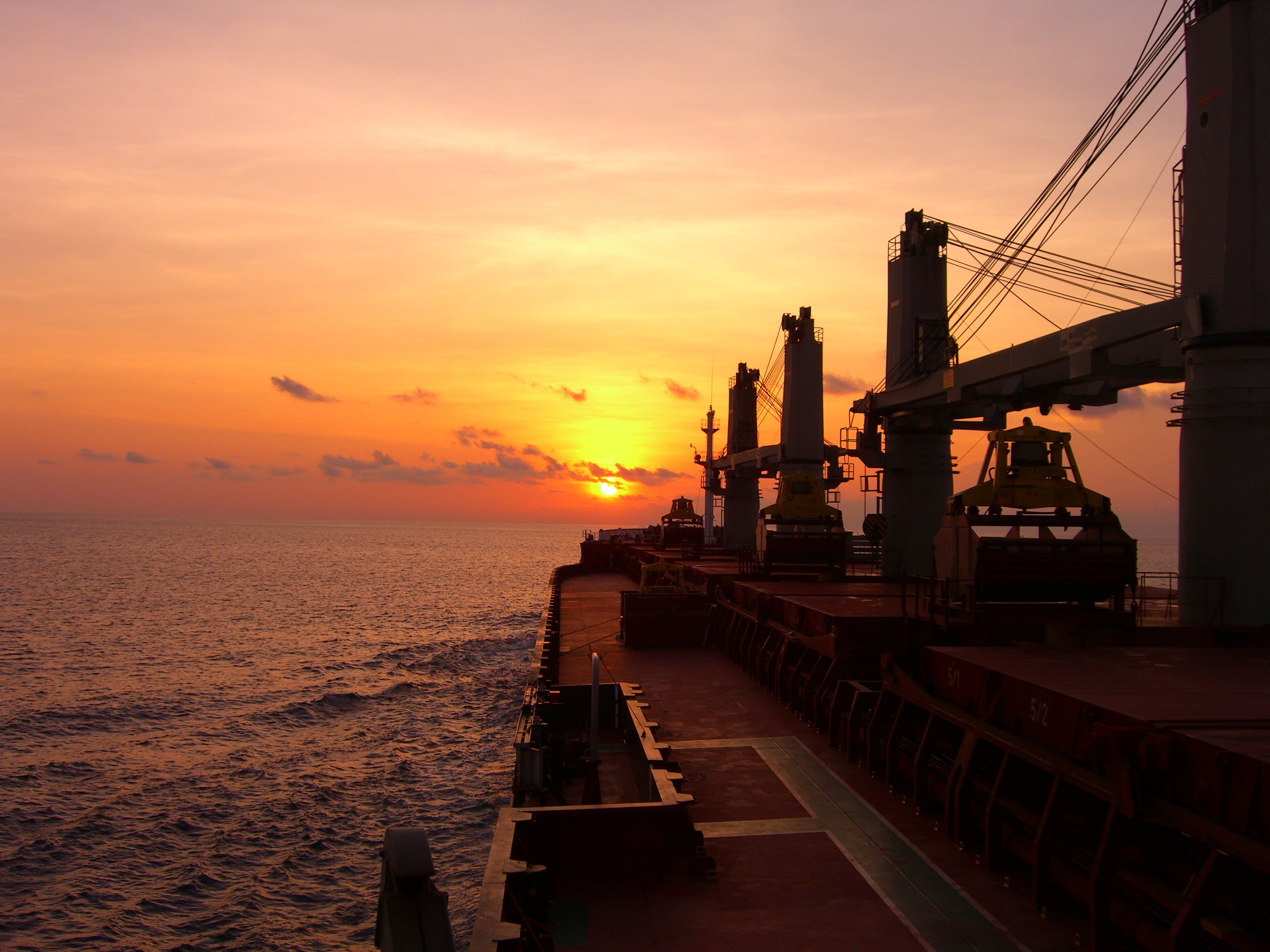
Handymax Bulk Carrier "Orientor 2"

Handymax and Supramax are naval architecture terms for the larger bulk carriers in the Handysize class. Handysize class consists of Supramax (50,000 to 60,000 DWT), Handymax (40,000 to 50,000 DWT), and Handy (<40,000 DWT). The ships are used for less voluminous cargoes, and different cargoes can be carried in different holds. Larger capacities for dry bulk include Panamax, Capesize and Very Large Ore Carriers and Chinamax.

A handymax ship is typically 150–200 m (492–656 ft) in length, though certain bulk terminal restrictions, such as those in Japan, mean that many handymax ships are just under 190 meters (623 ft) in overall length. Modern handymax and supramax designs are typically 52,000 58,000 t DWT in size, have five cargo holds and four cranes of around 30 tonnes working load, making it easier to use in ports with limited infrastructure. The average speed depends on size and age.

The cost of building a handymax is driven by the laws of supply and demand. In early 2007 the cost building a handymax was around $20 million. As the global economy boomed, the cost doubled to over $40 million, as demand for vessels of all sizes exceeded available yard capacity. After the 2008 financial crisis, the cost fell back to $20M. As of 2018, the average price was £23 million.
