= Code of Safe Practice for Ships Carrying Timber Deck Cargoes =

The Code of Safe Practice for Ships Carrying Timber Deck Cargoes (TDC Code) is the International Maritime Organization (IMO) standard for the safe carriage of timber deck cargoes.

== History ==
The Code was first developed in 1972. It was amended in 1978 and again in 1991 under IMO resolution A.715(17). The most recent amendment and issued form of the Code was in 2011.

== Content ==
The Code applies to all vessels internationally of 24 m or more in length.

The Code provides information for shipowners, ship operators and ship's officers regarding the safe transportation and stowage of timber deck cargoes. This includes logs and sawn timber, either loose or packaged. The Code details procedures for safe and secure stowage and timber securing systems. It also includes guidance for ship securing manuals and checklists for safe operations. Because of the increased weight of timber cargoes on a deck, the Code requires the ship's stability to be calculated according to a set list of criteria and guidance.

The 2011 update to the Code include the addition of loop lashing as an optional shipboard practice compared with top-over lashing for securing timber deck cargoes.
