= Capesize =

Class of dry cargo ships too large to transit the Panama or Suez Canals

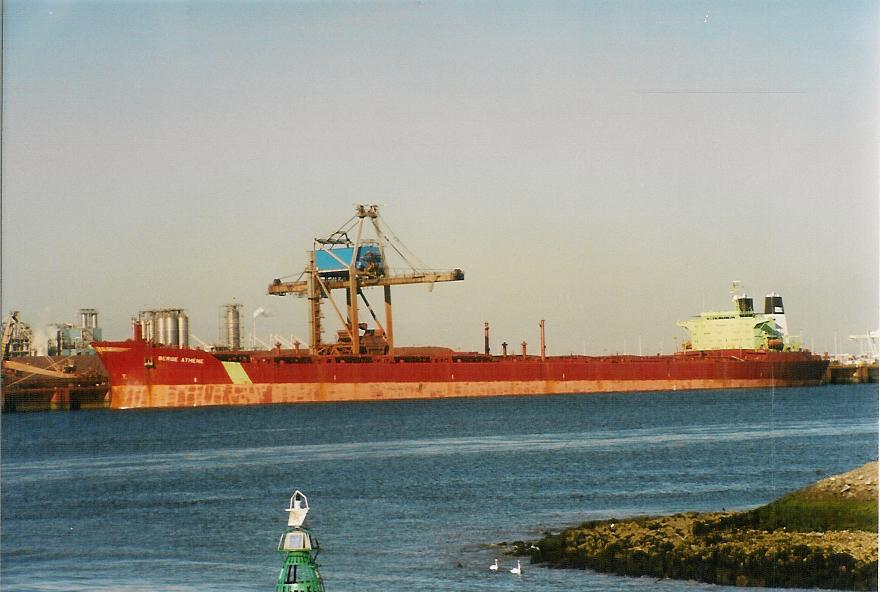
MV Berge Athene, a capesize bulk carrier of 225,200 DWT, built in 1979

Capesize ships are the largest dry cargo ships with ball mark dimension: (Note: Measured in relation to the Plimsoll line and the Plimsoll disc or 'ball mark'.) about 170,000 DWT (deadweight tonnage) capacity, 290 m (950 ft) long, 45 m (148 ft) beam (wide), 18 m (59 ft) draught (under water depth). They are too large to transit the Suez Canal (Suezmax limits) or Panama Canal (Neopanamax limits), and so have to pass either Cape Agulhas or Cape Horn to traverse between oceans.

When the Suez Canal was deepened in 2009, it became possible for some capesize ships to transit the canal and so change categories.

== Routes ==
Major capesize bulk trade routes include: Brazil to China, Australia to China, South Africa to China and South Africa to Europe.

== Classification ==
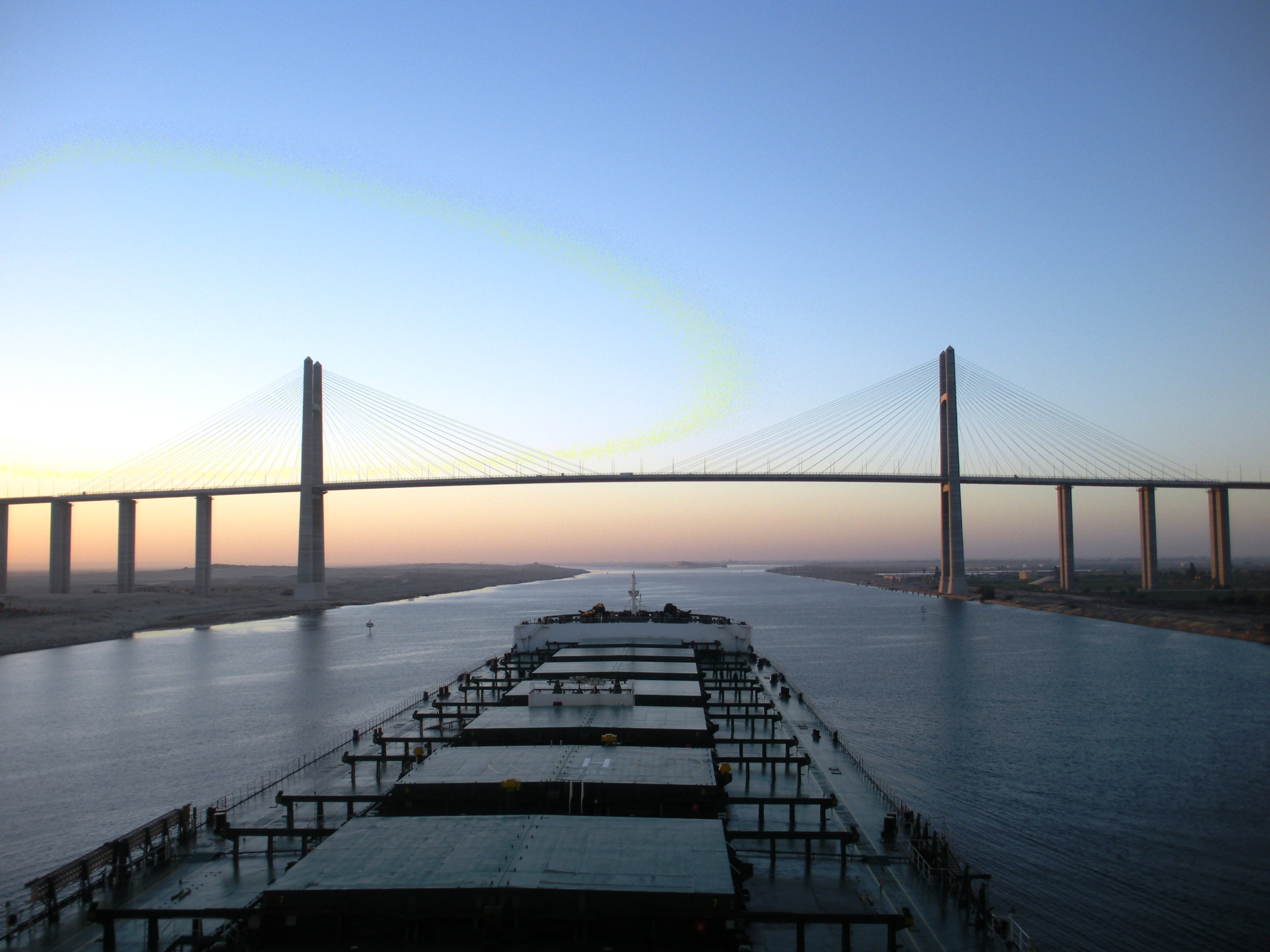
After deepening of the Suez Canal, a formerly capesize bulk carrier approaches the Suez Canal Bridge.

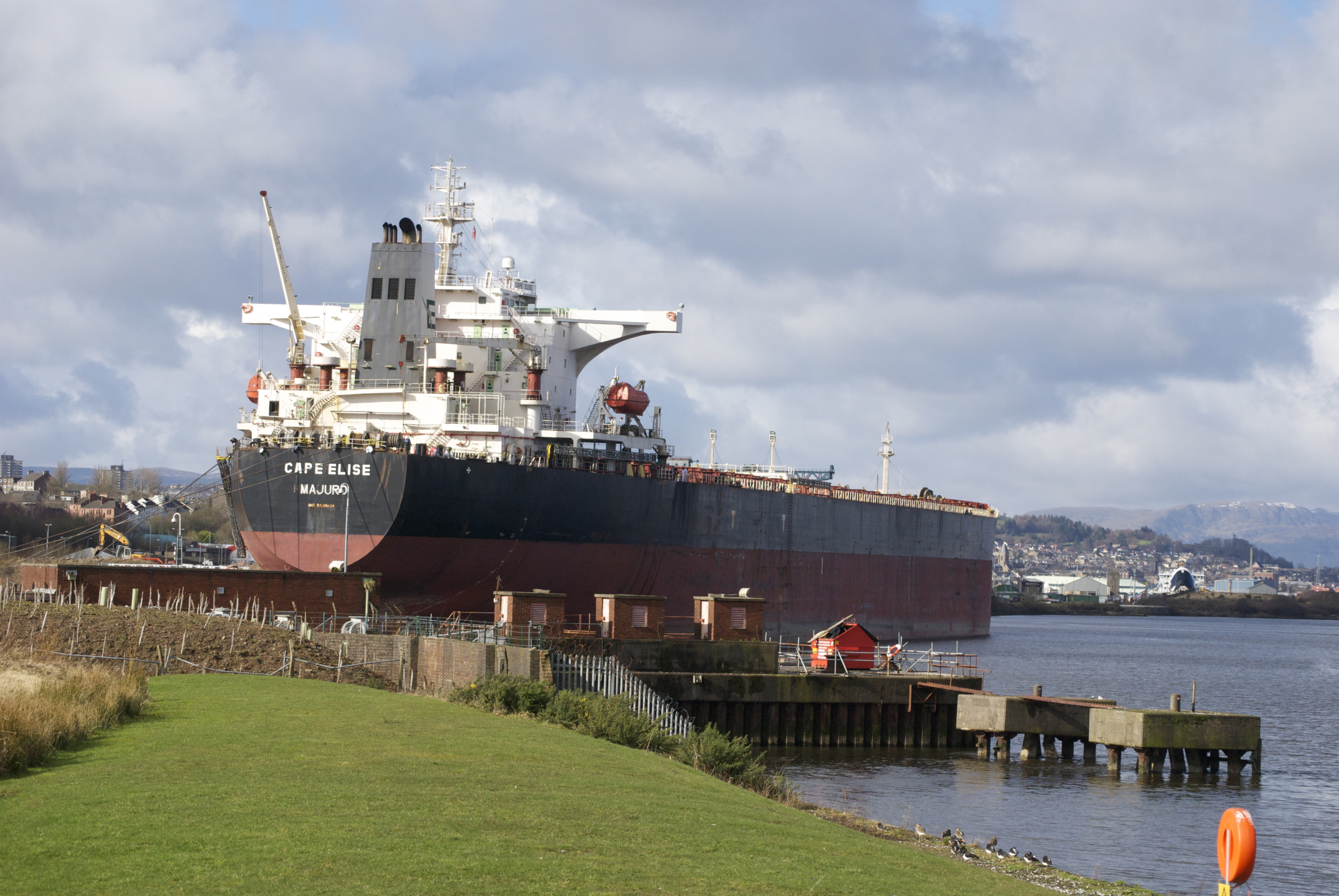
Capesize bulk carrier Cape Elise of 174,124 DWT at Inchgreen quay, Greenock, Scotland, for repairs in March 2014 after being struck by a massive wave. At 289 metres long, it was the largest ship to dock at Greenock in 20 years.

Ships in this class are bulk carriers, usually transporting coal, ore and other commodity raw materials. The term "capesize" is not applied to tankers. The average size of a capesize bulker is around 156,000 DWT, although larger ships (normally dedicated to ore transportation) have been built, up to 400,000 DWT. The large dimensions and deep draughts of such vessels mean that only the largest deep-water terminals can accommodate them.

Subcategories of capesize vessels include very large ore carriers (VLOC) and very large bulk carriers (VLBC) of above 200,000 DWT. These vessels are mainly designed to carry iron ore.

== See also ==
- Cape Route – Shipping route around the Cape of Good Hope
- List of Panamax ports
- Cargo ship size categories
- Suezmax – Largest ships that can transit the Suez Canal
