= Panama City =

Capital and largest city of the Republic of Panama

Panama City Ciudad de Panamá
- Capital city
- Nuestra Señora de la Asunción de Panamá
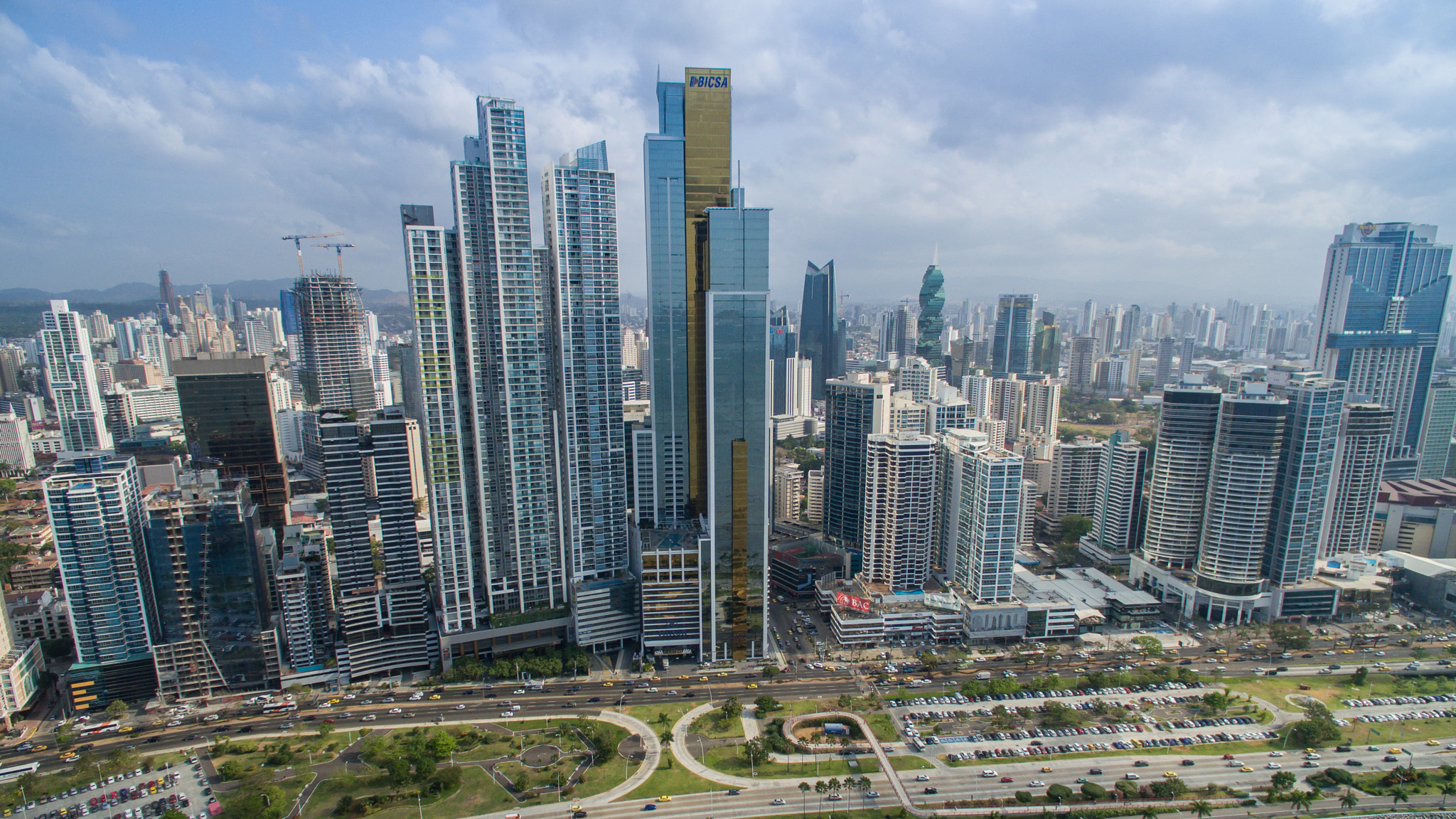
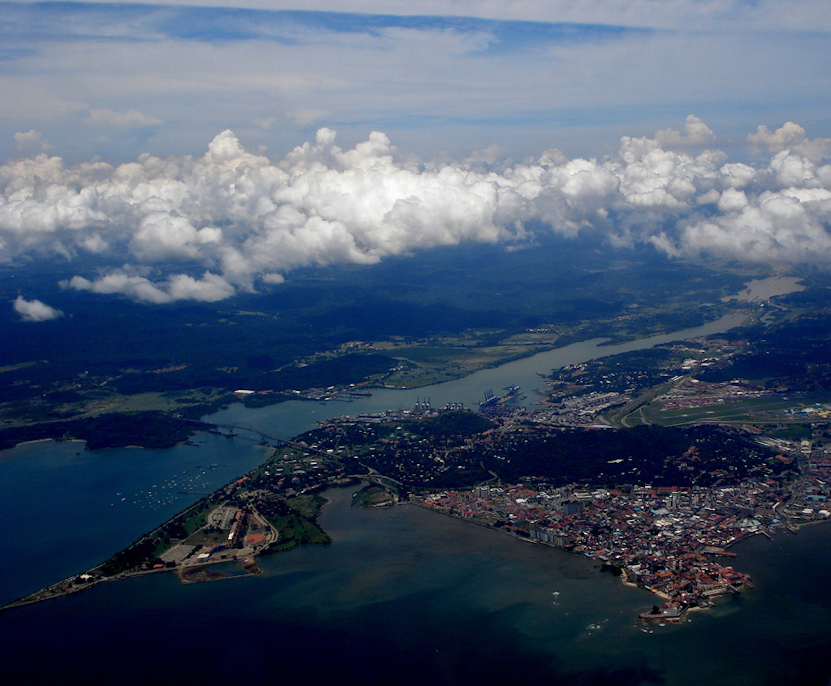
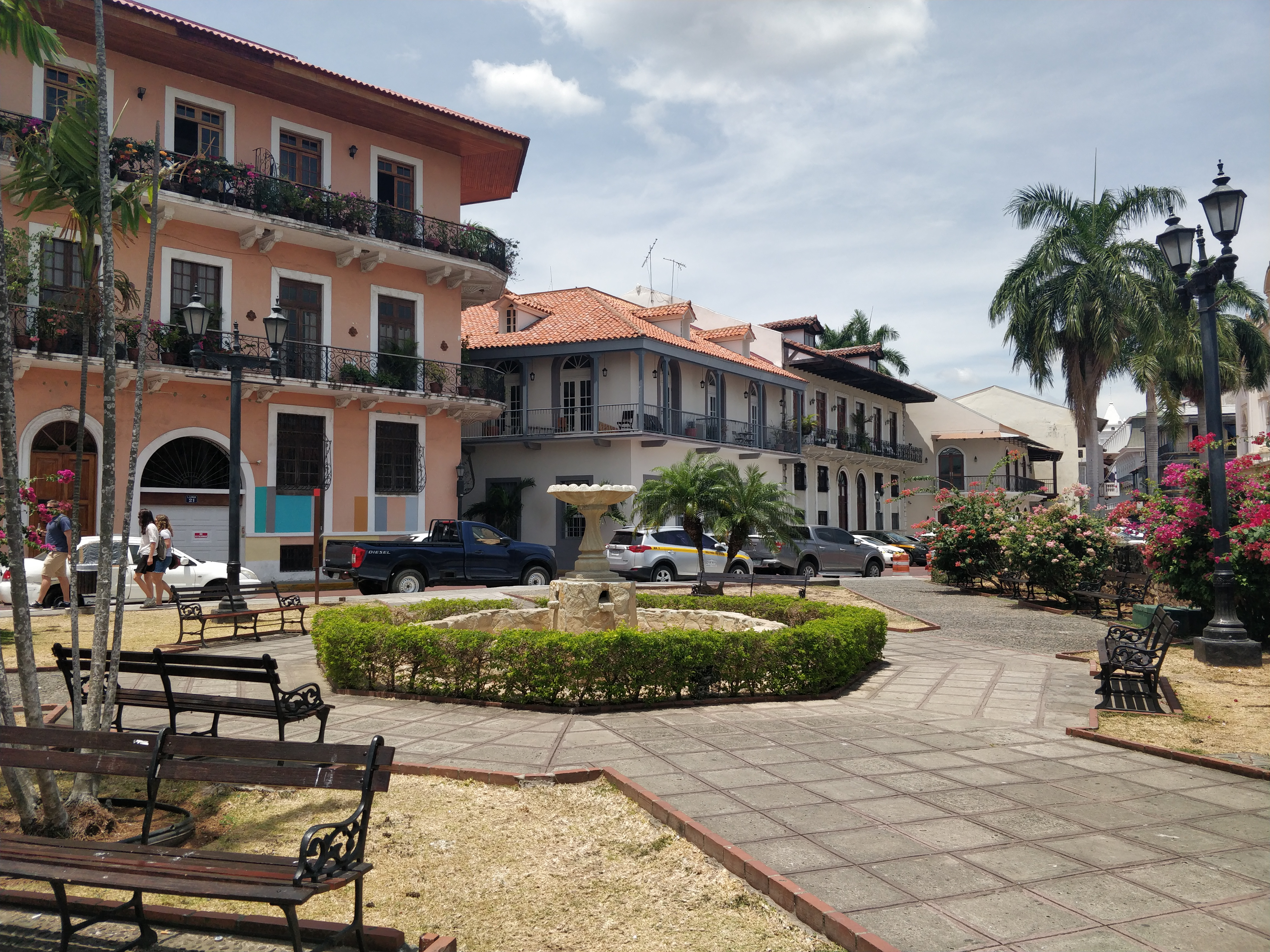
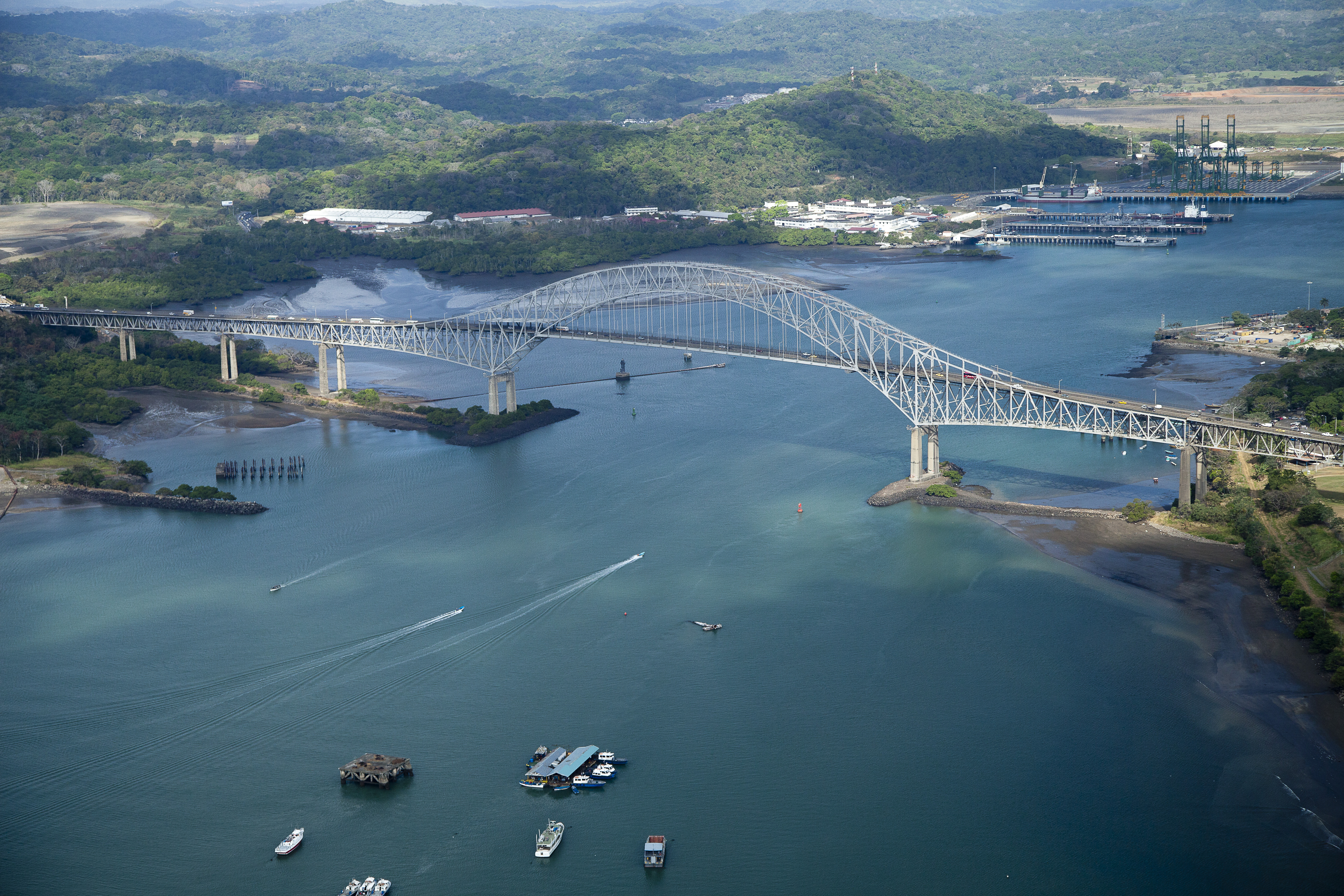
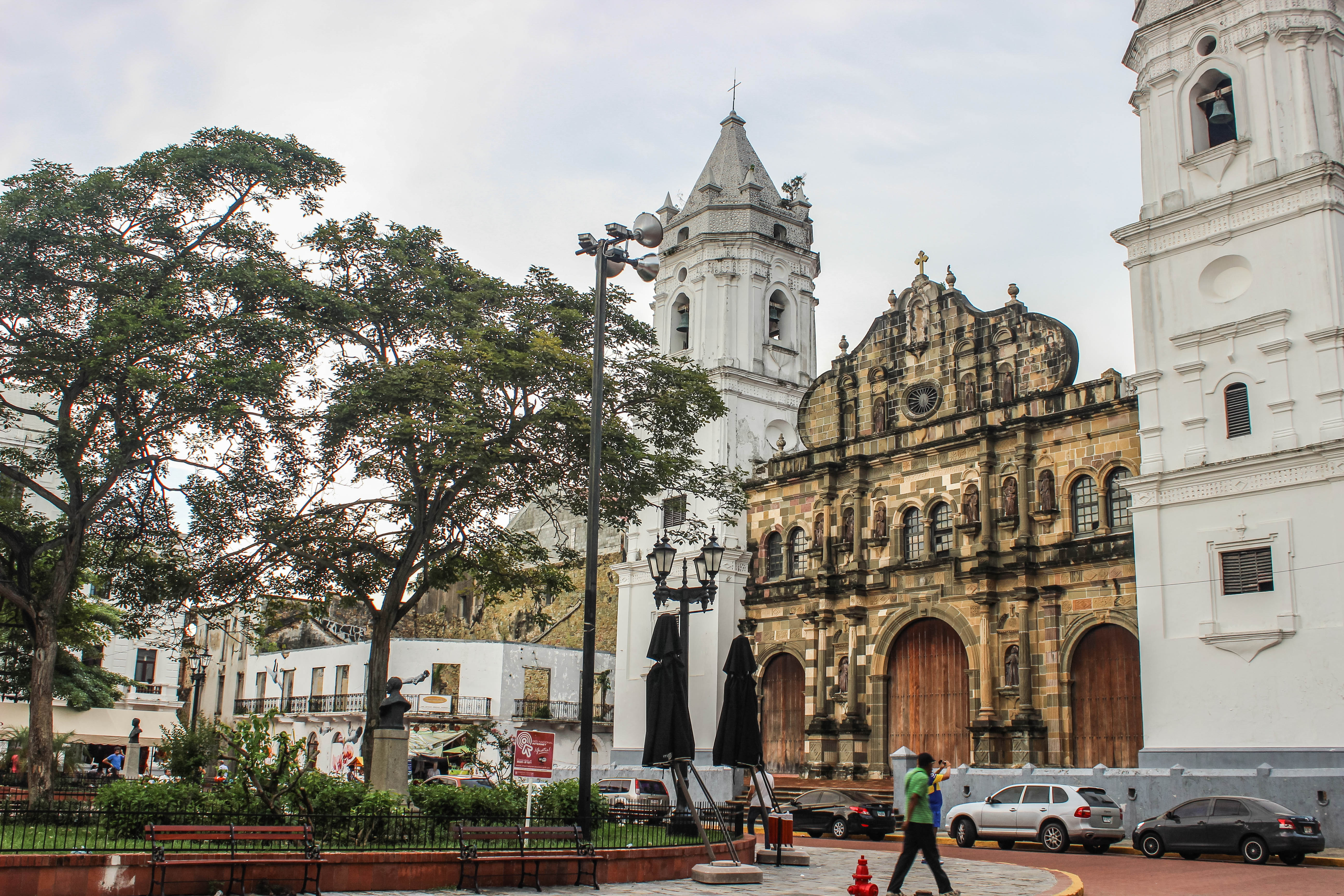
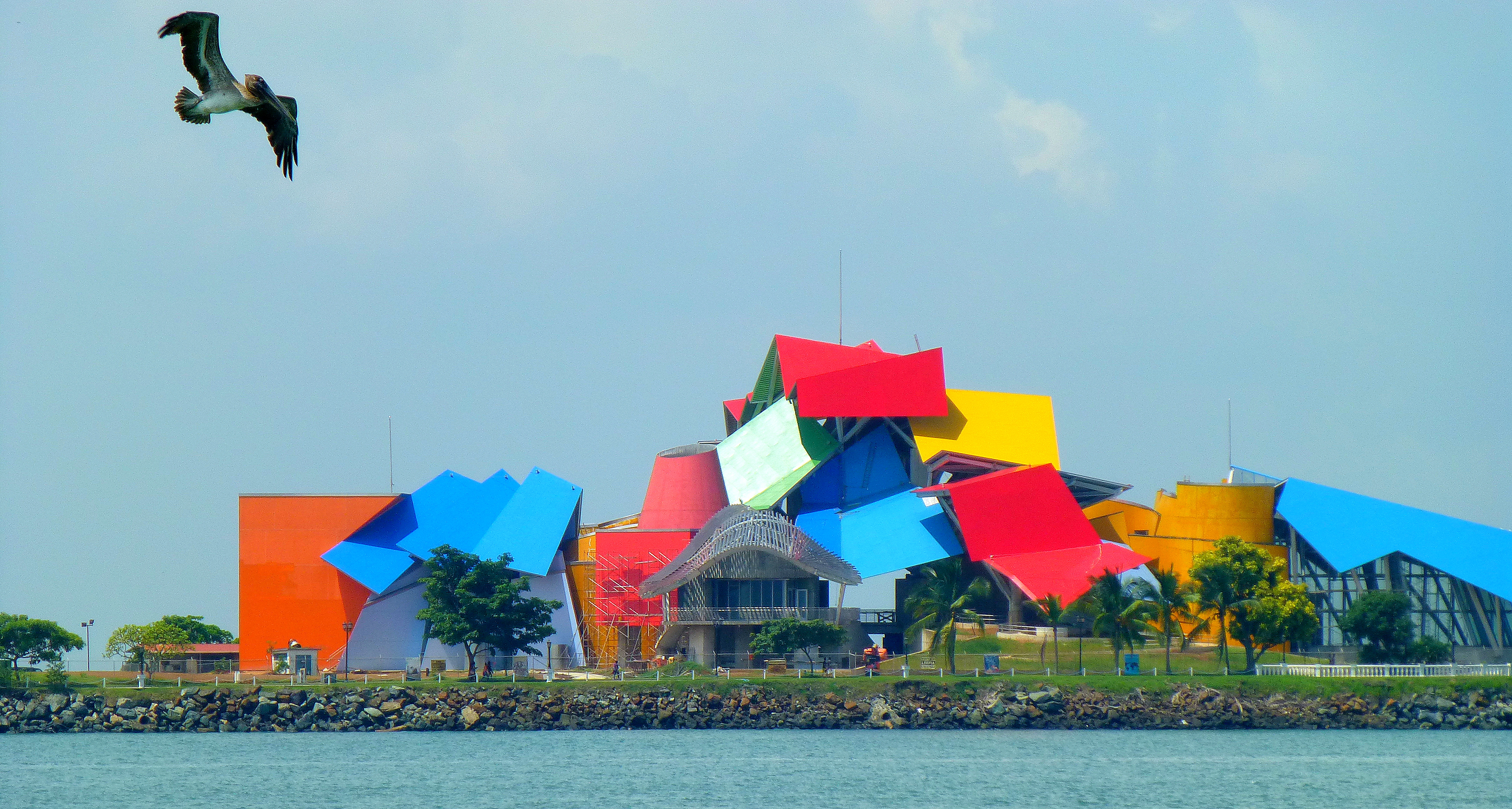
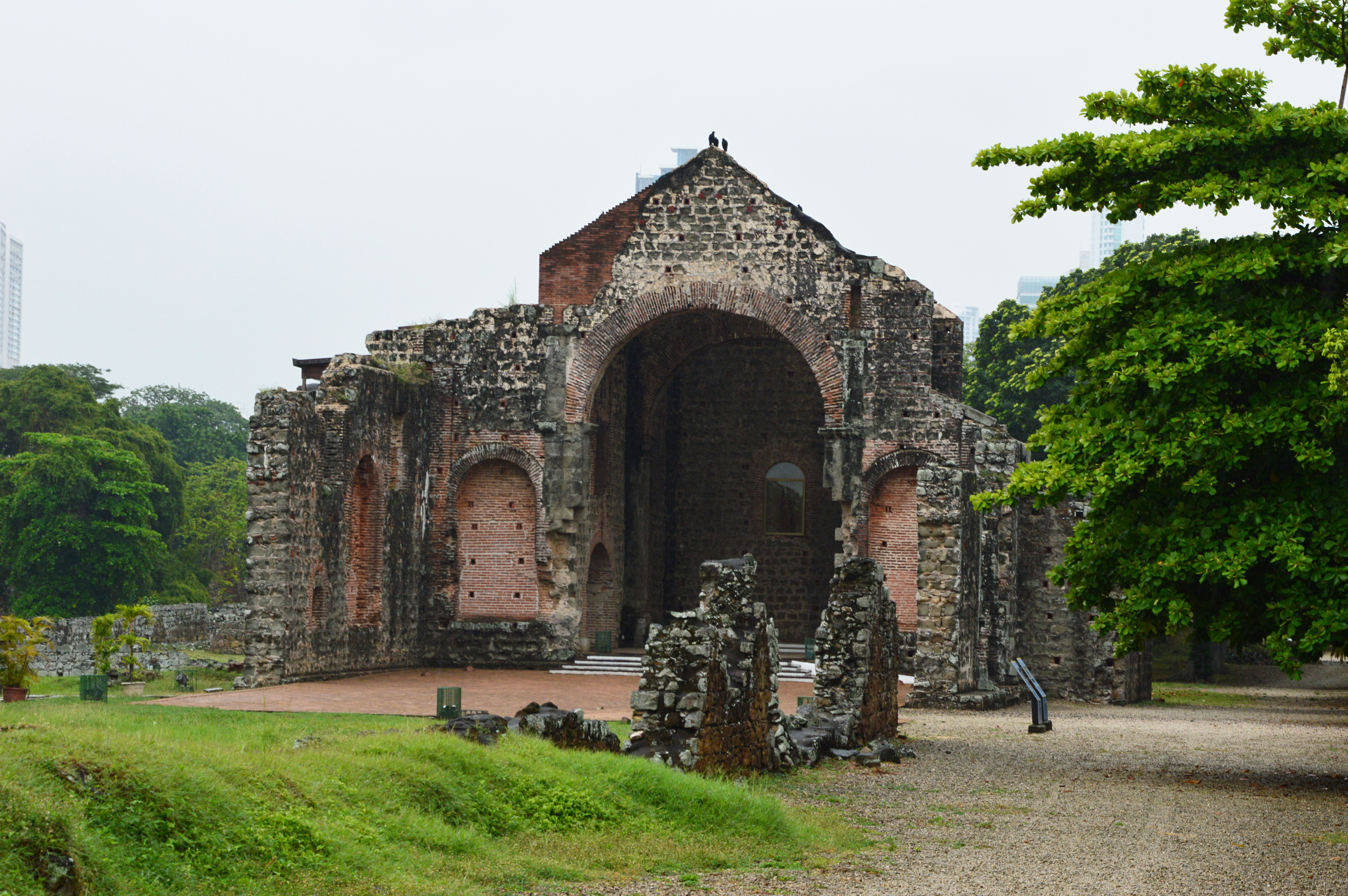
- Skyline of Panama City Panama Canal Casco Viejo (old quarter) Bridge of the Americas Metropolitan Cathedral of Panama Biomuseo Panama Viejo

- Flag Coat of arms Wordmark

- Location within Panama Location within Central America Location within North America
- Coordinates: 8°58′16″N 79°32′05″W
- Country: Panama
- Province: Panamá Province
- District: Panamá District
- Foundation: 15 August 1519
- Founder: Pedro Arias de Ávila

Government
  - Mayor: Mayer Mizrachi (PP)

Area
  - Capital city: 86.6 km^{2} (33.4 sq mi)
  - Metro: 2,560.8 km^{2} (988.7 sq mi)
- Elevation: 2 m (6.6 ft)

Population (2023 census)
  - Capital city: 1,086,990
  - Rank: 1st in Panama; 7th in Central America
  - Density: 4,750/km^{2} (12,300/sq mi)
  - Urban: 1,132,969
  - Metro: 2,100,189

GDP (Nominal, 2023)
  - Metro: US$38.4 billion
  - Per capita: US$19,400
- Time zone: UTC−05:00 (EST)
- Area code: (+507) 2, 3
- HDI (2017): 0.820 – very high
- Website: MuPa.gob.pa

Panama City, also known as Panama, (Note: Panamá in Spanish) is the capital and largest city of the Republic of Panama. It has a total population of 410,354 in the city proper and 1,086,990 in the Panamá District, which includes the outer corregimientos of the city. The metropolitan area has over 2,100,000 people. The city is at the Pacific entrance of the Panama Canal, in the province of Panama. The city is the political and administrative center of the country, as well as a hub for banking and commerce.

The city of Panama was founded on 15 August 1519, by Spanish conquistador Pedro Arias Dávila. The city was the starting point for expeditions that conquered the Inca Empire of Peru. It was a stopover point on one of the most important trade routes in the American continent, leading to the fairs of Nombre de Dios and Portobelo, through which passed most of the gold and silver that Spain mined from the Americas.

On 28 January 1671, the original city was destroyed by a fire when the privateer Henry Morgan sacked and set fire to it. The city was formally reestablished two years later on 21 January 1673, on a peninsula 8 km (5 miles) from the original settlement. The site of the previously devastated city is still in ruins, and is now a World Heritage Site and popular tourist attraction.

== History ==
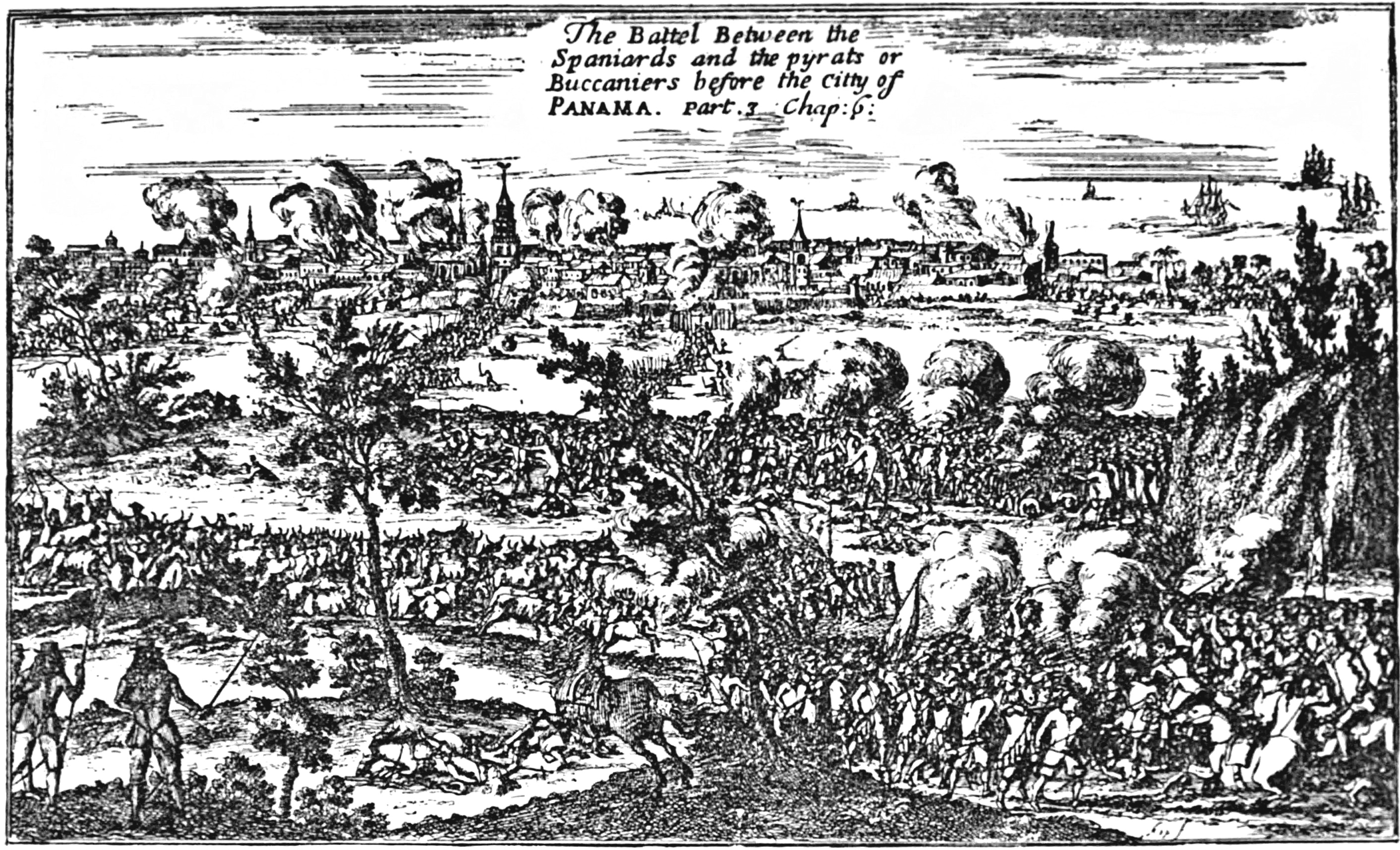
Panama City being burned by pirate (privateer) Henry Morgan in 1671. Illustration by Alexandre Exquemelin.

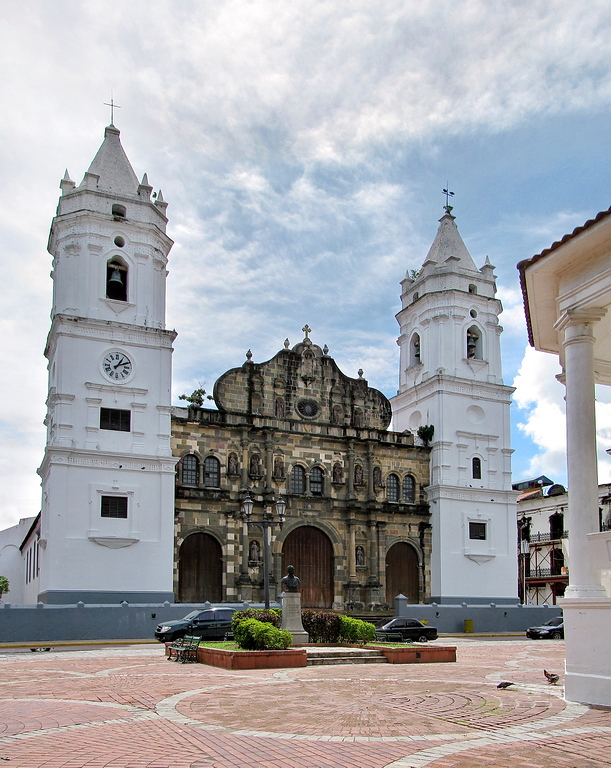
Colonial Metropolitan Cathedral of Panama City

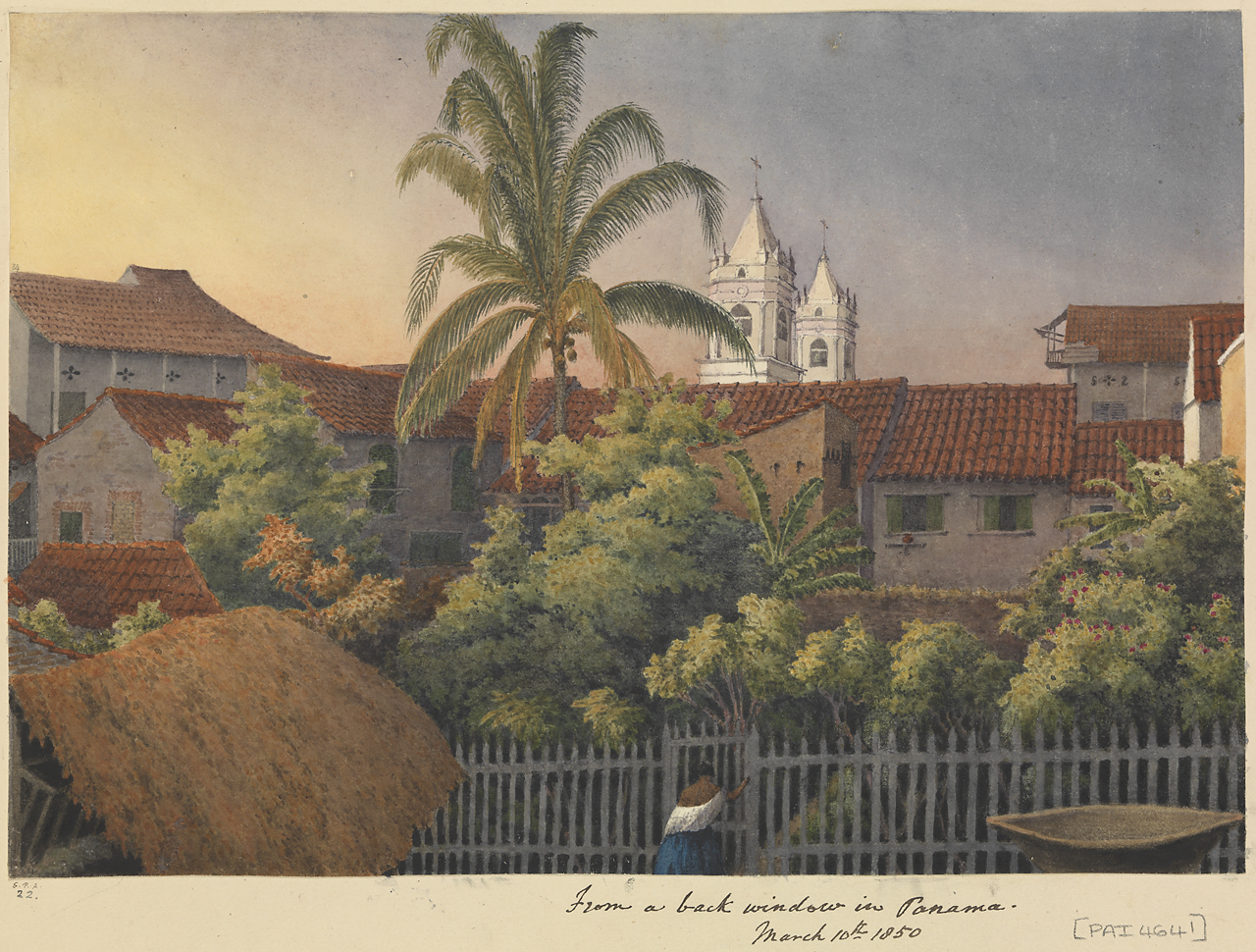
A view of Panama City, in 1850 by Edward Fanshawe.

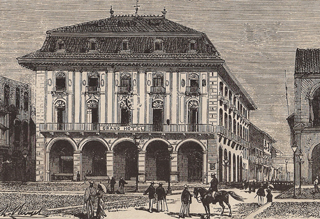
Former Gran Hotel in Panama City, illustration of 1875. Currently houses the Panama Canal Museum.

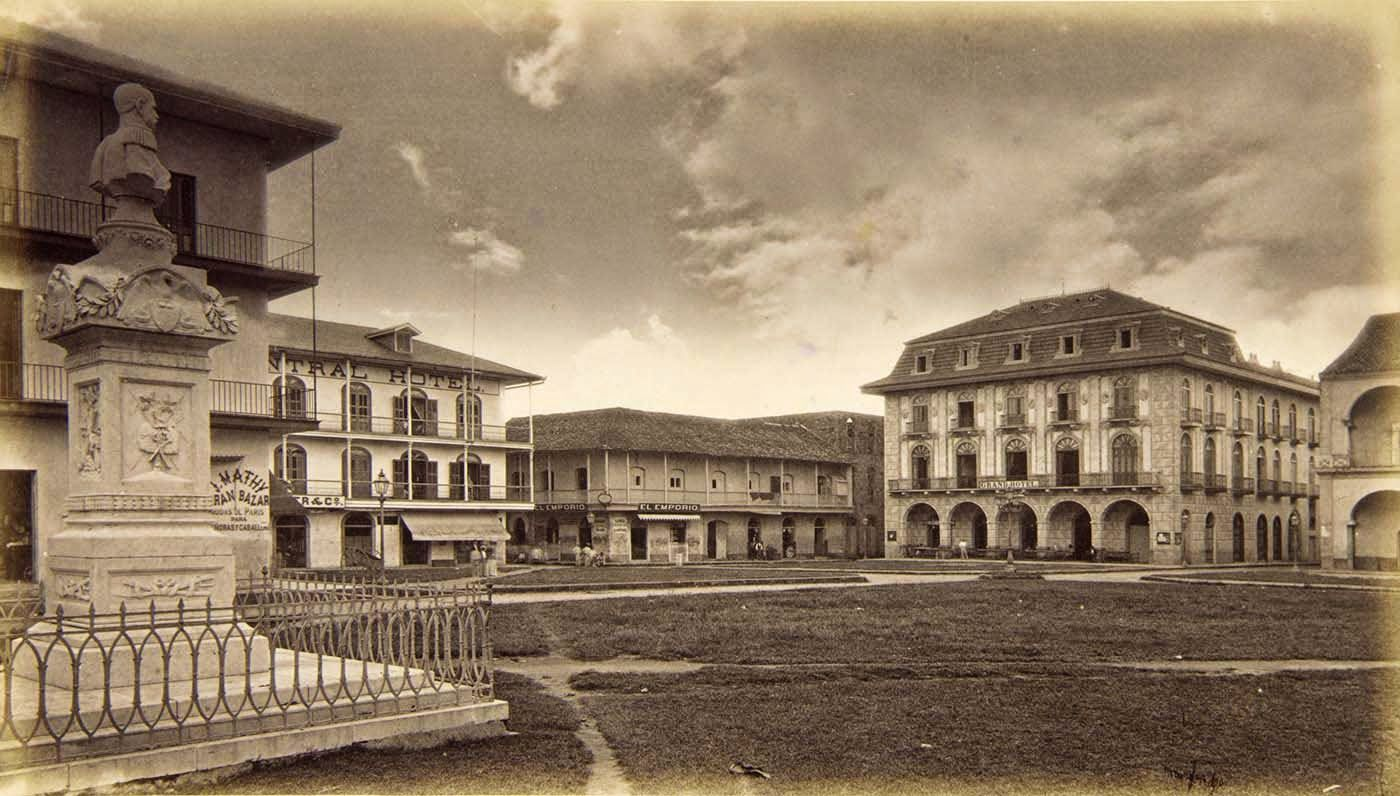
Plaza Mayor de Panamá in 1875, by Eadweard Muybridge. Now called the Plaza Independencia.

The city was founded on 15 August 1519, by Pedro Arias de Ávila, also known as Pedrarias Dávila. Within a few years of its founding, the city became a launching point for the exploration and conquest of Peru and a transit point for gold and silver headed back to Spain through the Isthmus. The Genoese-Italians and the Spanish encountered coconuts which had arrived from the Philippines before Spanish colonization. In 1520, Genoese merchants controlled the port and the commerce of the region, mainly for the slave trade, thanks to a concession given by the Spaniards, who had the Republic of Genoa as its main banking base.

In 1671 Henry Morgan with a band of 1,400 men attacked and looted the city, which was subsequently destroyed by fire. The ruins of the old city still remain and are a popular tourist attraction known as Panamá Viejo (Old Panama). The city was rebuilt in 1673 in a new location approximately 5 miles (8 km) southwest of the original city. This is now known as the Casco Viejo (Old Quarter) of the city. Panama City is the fourth earliest-founded of the modern-day capital cities in the Americas.

One year before the start of the California Gold Rush, the Panama Railroad Company was formed, but the railroad did not begin full operation until 1855. Between 1848 and 1869, the year the first transcontinental railroad was completed in the United States, about 375,000 people crossed the isthmus from the Atlantic to the Pacific, and 225,000 in the opposite direction. This traffic greatly increased the prosperity of the city during that period.

After declaring independence from Colombia on 3 November 1903, Philippe Bunau-Varilla (a French engineer) was named Envoy Extraordinary and Minister Plenipotentiary. Bunau-Varilla negotiated the Hay-Bunau-Varilla Treaty of 1903, which provided the United States with a 10-mile-wide strip of land for the canal, a one-time $10 million payment to Panama, and an annual annuity of $250,000. The United States also agreed to guarantee the independence of Panama. Completed in 1914, the Panama Canal symbolized U.S. technological prowess and economic power. Although U.S. control of the canal eventually became an irritant to U.S.-Panamanian relations, at the time it was heralded as a major foreign policy achievement.

The construction of the Panama Canal was of great benefit to the infrastructure and economy. Of particular note are the improvements in health and sanitation brought about by the American presence in the Canal Zone. William Gorgas, the chief sanitary officer for the canal construction, had a particularly large impact. He hypothesized that diseases were spread by the abundance of mosquitos native to the area, and ordered the fumigation of homes and the cleansing of water. This led to yellow fever being eradicated by November 1905, as well malaria rates falling dramatically. However, most of the laborers for the construction of the canal were brought in from the Caribbean, which created unprecedented racial and social tensions in the city.

During World War II, construction of military bases and the presence of larger numbers of U.S. military and civilian personnel brought about unprecedented levels of prosperity to the city. Panamanians had limited access, or no access at all, to many areas in the Canal Zone neighboring the Panama city metropolitan area. Some of these areas were military bases accessible only to United States personnel. Some tensions arose between the people of Panama and the U.S. citizens living in the Panama Canal Zone. This erupted in the 9 January 1964, events, known as Martyrs' Day.

In the late 1970s through the 1980s the city of Panama became an international banking center, bringing a lot of undesirable attention as an international money-laundering locale. In 1989 after nearly a year of tension between the United States and Panama, President George H. W. Bush ordered the invasion of Panama to depose General Manuel Noriega, the country's de facto dictator. As a result, a portion of the El Chorrillo neighborhood, which consisted mostly of old wood-framed buildings dating back to the 1900s (though still a large slum area), was destroyed by fire. In 1999, the United States officially transferred full control of the Panama Canal to the Republic of Panama, which remains in control today.

The city of Panama is still a banking center, although with very visible controls in the flow of cash. Shipping is handled through port facilities in the area of Balboa operated by the Hutchison Whampoa Company of Hong Kong and through several ports on the Caribbean side of the isthmus. Balboa, which is within the greater Panama metropolitan area, was formerly part of the Panama Canal Zone, and the administration of the former Panama Canal Zone was headquartered there.

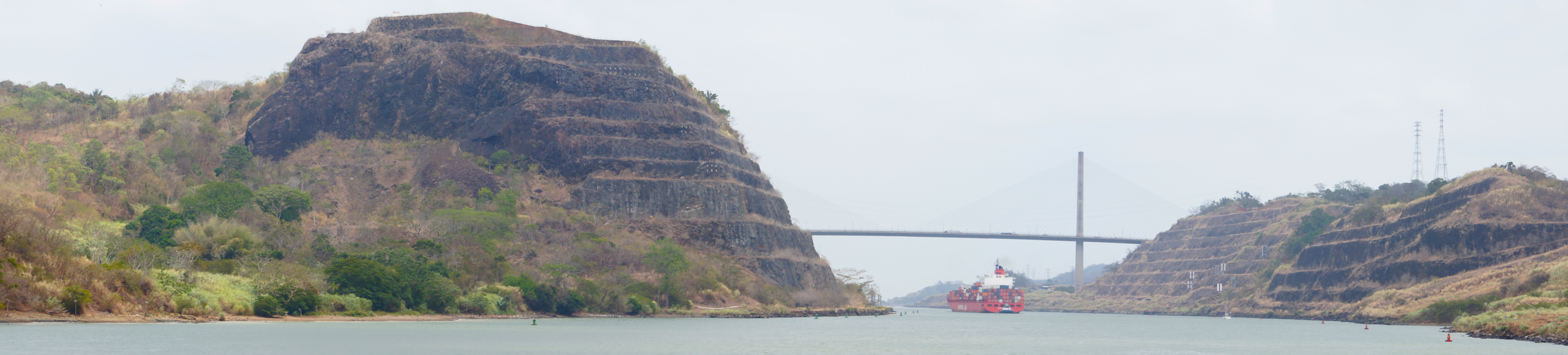
The Panama Canal is one of the main attractions to the Panama City area. The Centennial Bridge spans the area near Gold Hill on the left and Contractor Hill on the right. This is the site of the highest elevation of the Panama Canal construction.

== Geography ==
Panamá is between the Pacific Ocean and tropical rain forest in the northern part of Panama. The Parque Natural Metropolitano (Metropolitan Nature Park), stretching from Panama City along the Panama Canal, has unique bird species and other animals, such as tapir, puma, and caimans. At the Pacific entrance of the canal is the Centro de Exhibiciones Marinas (Marine Exhibitions Center), a research center for those interested in tropical marine life and ecology, managed by the Smithsonian Tropical Research Institute.

Tropical forests around Panama are vital for the functioning of the Panama Canal, providing it with the water required for its operation. Due to the canal's importance to the Panamanian economy, tropical forests around the canal have been kept in an almost pristine state; the canal is thus a rare example of a vast engineering project in the middle of a forest that helped to preserve that forest. Along the western side of the canal is the Parque Nacional Soberanía (Sovereignty National Park), which includes the Summit botanical gardens and a zoo. The best known trail in this national park is Pipeline Road, popular among birdwatchers.

Nearly 500 rivers lace Panama's rugged landscape. Most are unnavigable; many originate as swift highland streams, meander in valleys, and form coastal deltas. However, the Río Chepo and the Río Chagres, both within the boundaries of the city, work as sources of hydroelectric power.

The Río Chagres is one of the longest and most vital of the approximately 150 rivers that flow into the Caribbean. Part of this river was dammed to create Gatun Lake, which forms a major part of the transit route between the locks near each end of the canal. Both Gatun Lake and Madden Lake (also filled with water from the Río Chagres) provide hydroelectricity to the former Canal Zone area. The Río Chepo, another major source of hydroelectric power, is one of the more than 300 rivers emptying into the Pacific.

=== Climate ===
Under the Köppen climate classification, Panama City has a tropical savanna climate (Köppen Aw), a little drier than a tropical monsoon climate. It sees 1,900 mm (74.8 in) of precipitation annually. The wet season spans from May through November, and the dry season spans from December through April. Temperatures remain constant throughout the year, averaging around 27 °C (81 °F). Sunshine is subdued in Panama because it lies in the Intertropical Convergence Zone, where there is a nearly continual cloud formation, even during the dry season.

Climate data for Panama City (1991–2020)
Month	Jan	Feb	Mar	Apr	May	Jun	Jul	Aug	Sep	Oct	Nov	Dec	Year
Mean daily maximum °C (°F)	32.2 (90.0)	32.7 (90.9)	33.2 (91.8)	33.4 (92.1)	32.4 (90.3)	31.8 (89.2)	31.8 (89.2)	31.9 (89.4)	31.4 (88.5)	31.1 (88.0)	31.1 (88.0)	31.7 (89.1)	32.1 (89.8)
Daily mean °C (°F)	26.8 (80.2)	27.1 (80.8)	27.5 (81.5)	28.0 (82.4)	27.6 (81.7)	27.2 (81.0)	27.2 (81.0)	27.2 (81.0)	26.9 (80.4)	26.6 (79.9)	26.6 (79.9)	26.9 (80.4)	27.2 (81.0)
Mean daily minimum °C (°F)	21.4 (70.5)	21.5 (70.7)	21.8 (71.2)	22.6 (72.7)	22.9 (73.2)	22.7 (72.9)	22.6 (72.7)	22.5 (72.5)	22.4 (72.3)	22.2 (72.0)	22.1 (71.8)	21.8 (71.2)	22.3 (72.1)
Average rainfall mm (inches)	24.1 (0.95)	12.3 (0.48)	14.2 (0.56)	71.0 (2.80)	221.8 (8.73)	242.0 (9.53)	189.5 (7.46)	221.0 (8.70)	268.4 (10.57)	311.2 (12.25)	258.9 (10.19)	124.6 (4.91)	1,959 (77.13)
Average rainy days (≥ 1 mm)	2.4	1.6	1.9	5.2	15.4	16.8	15.1	16.0	17.4	19.5	16.8	7.5	137.5
Average relative humidity (%)	71.2	68.4	66.8	68.2	78.4	82.1	81.6	81.9	83.4	84.7	83.5	76.8	77.3
Mean monthly sunshine hours	244.9	232.0	248.0	195.0	139.5	117.0	133.3	130.2	114.0	111.6	132.0	186.0	1,983.5
Mean daily daylight hours	11.7	11.8	12.1	12.3	12.4	12.6	12.6	12.4	12.2	11.9	11.7	11.6	12.1
Percentage possible sunshine	69	70	67	53	36	31	34	34	32	31	38	52	46
Average ultraviolet index	11	12	12	12	12	12	12	12	12	12	11	10	12
Source 1: World Meteorological Organization
Source 2: ETESA (sunshine data recorded at Albrook Field) Weather Spark, Weather.Directory and Weather Atlas (uv index)

== Cityscape ==
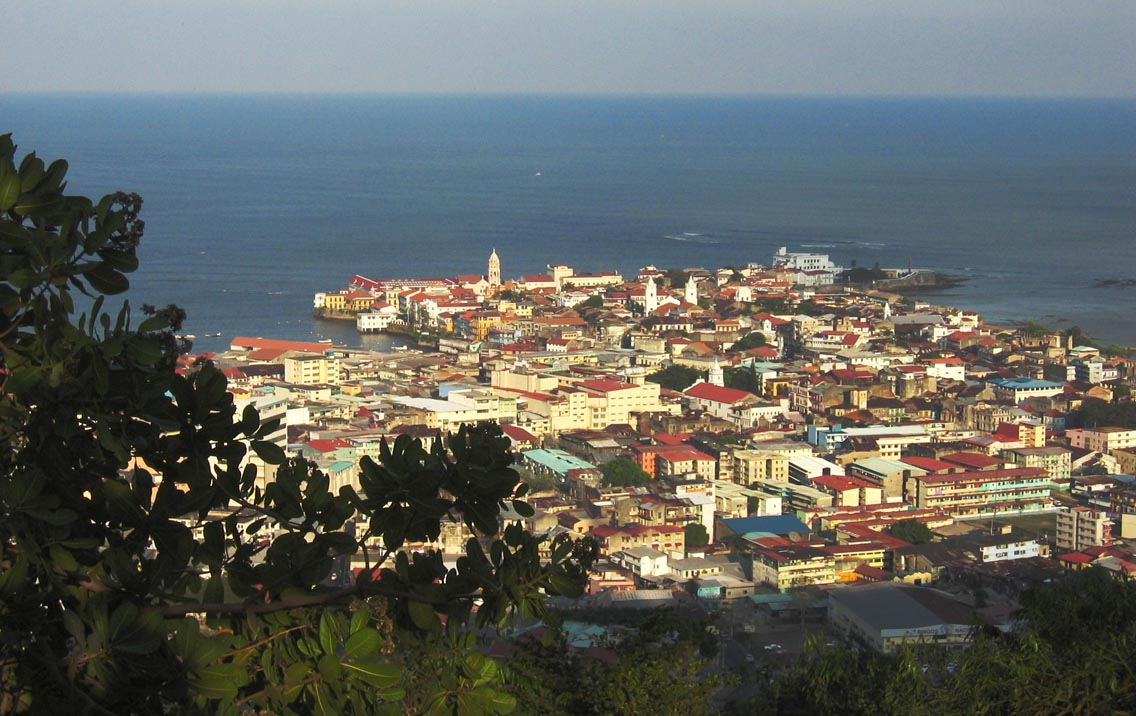
Casco Viejo (Old town) seen from Ancón Hill

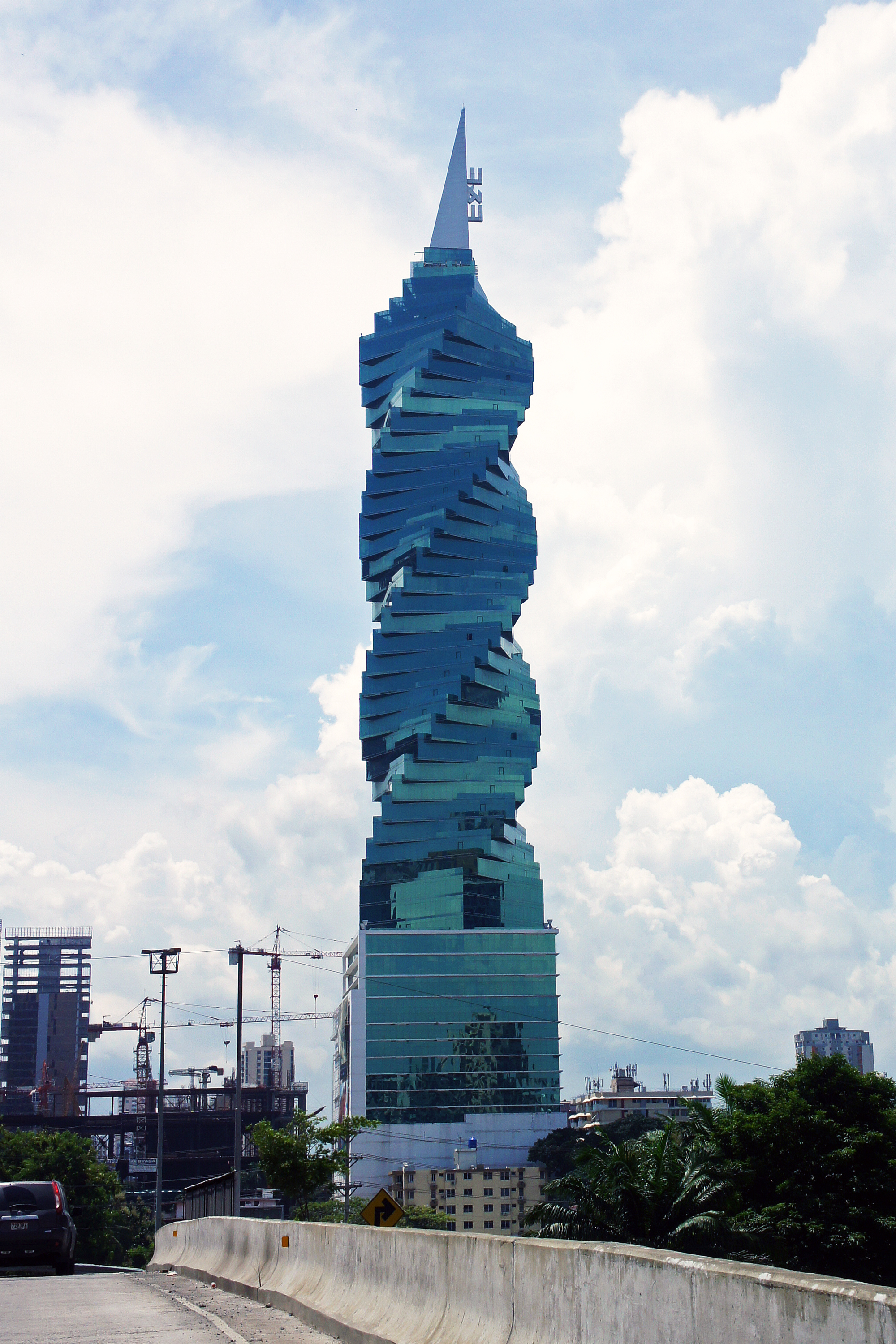
The F&F tower, more commonly known as "El tornillo" or "La torre tornillo" meaning "the screw" or "the screw tower"

=== Architecture ===
Panama's old quarter (or Casco Viejo, Panama) features many architectural styles, from Spanish colonial buildings to French and Antillean townhouses built during the construction of the Panama Canal. The more modern areas of the city have many high-rise buildings, which together form a very dense skyline. There are more than 110 high-rise projects under construction, with 127 already built. The city holds the 45th place in the world by high-rise buildings count.

The Centennial Bridge that crosses the Panama Canal earned the American Segmental Bridge Institute prize of excellence, along with seven other bridges in the Americas.

=== Neighborhoods ===
The city is in Panama District, although its metropolitan area also includes some populated areas on the opposite side of the Panama Canal. As in the rest of the country, the city is divided into corregimientos, in which there are many smaller boroughs. The old quarter, known as the Casco Viejo, is in the corregimiento of San Felipe. San Felipe and twelve other corregimientos form the urban center of the city, including Santa Ana, El Chorrillo, Calidonia, Curundú, Ancón, Bella Vista, Bethania, San Francisco, Juan Diaz, Pueblo Nuevo, Parque Lefevre, and Río Abajo.

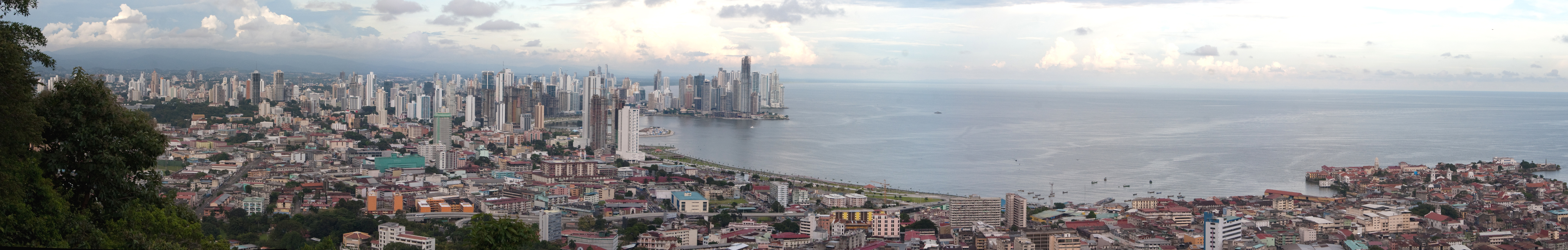
The skyline of Panama City from Ancon Hill. 2008

== Economy ==
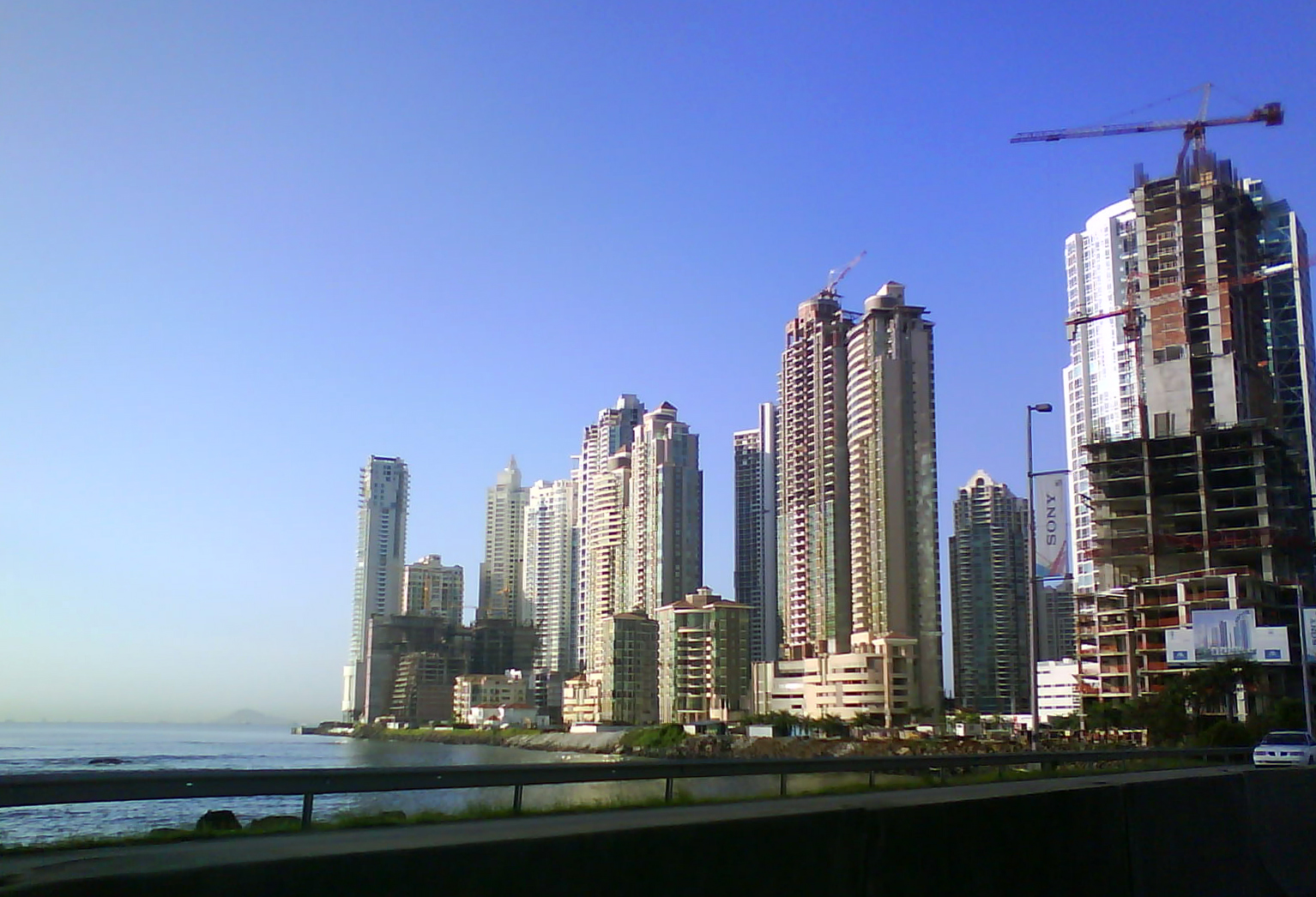
Construction boom in Panama City

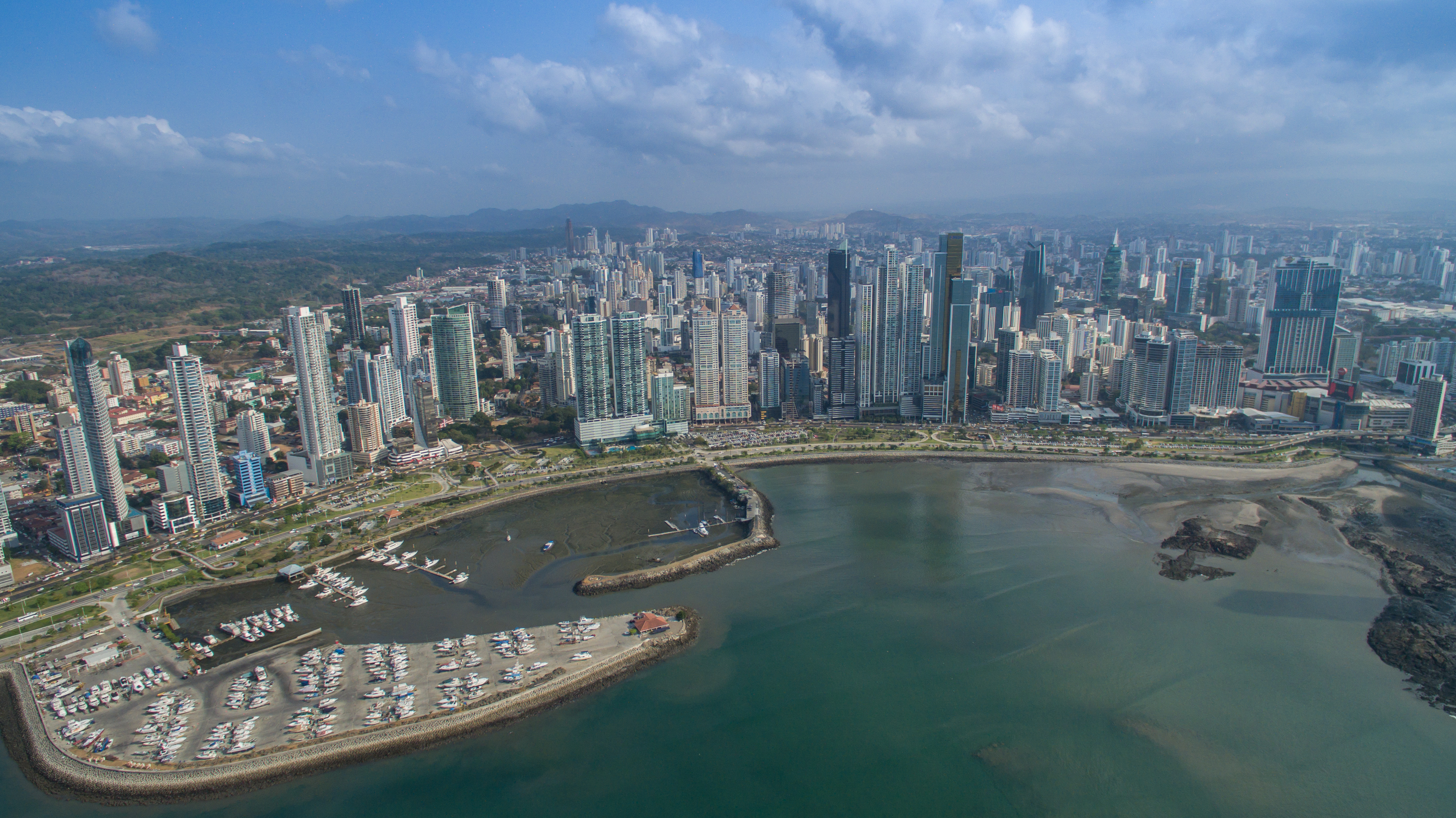
Panama City financial district

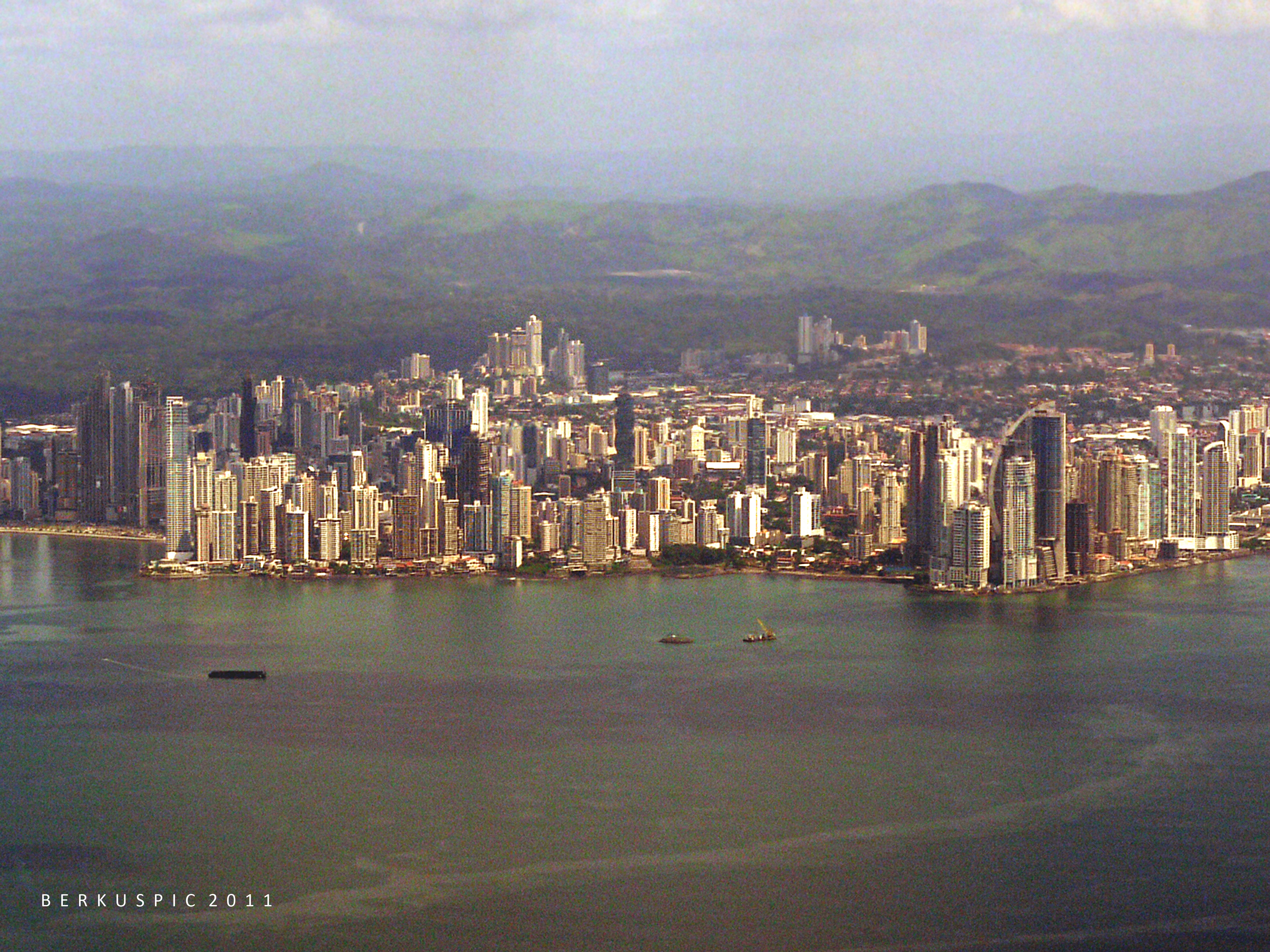
Aerial view of Punta Paitilla and Punta Pacífica

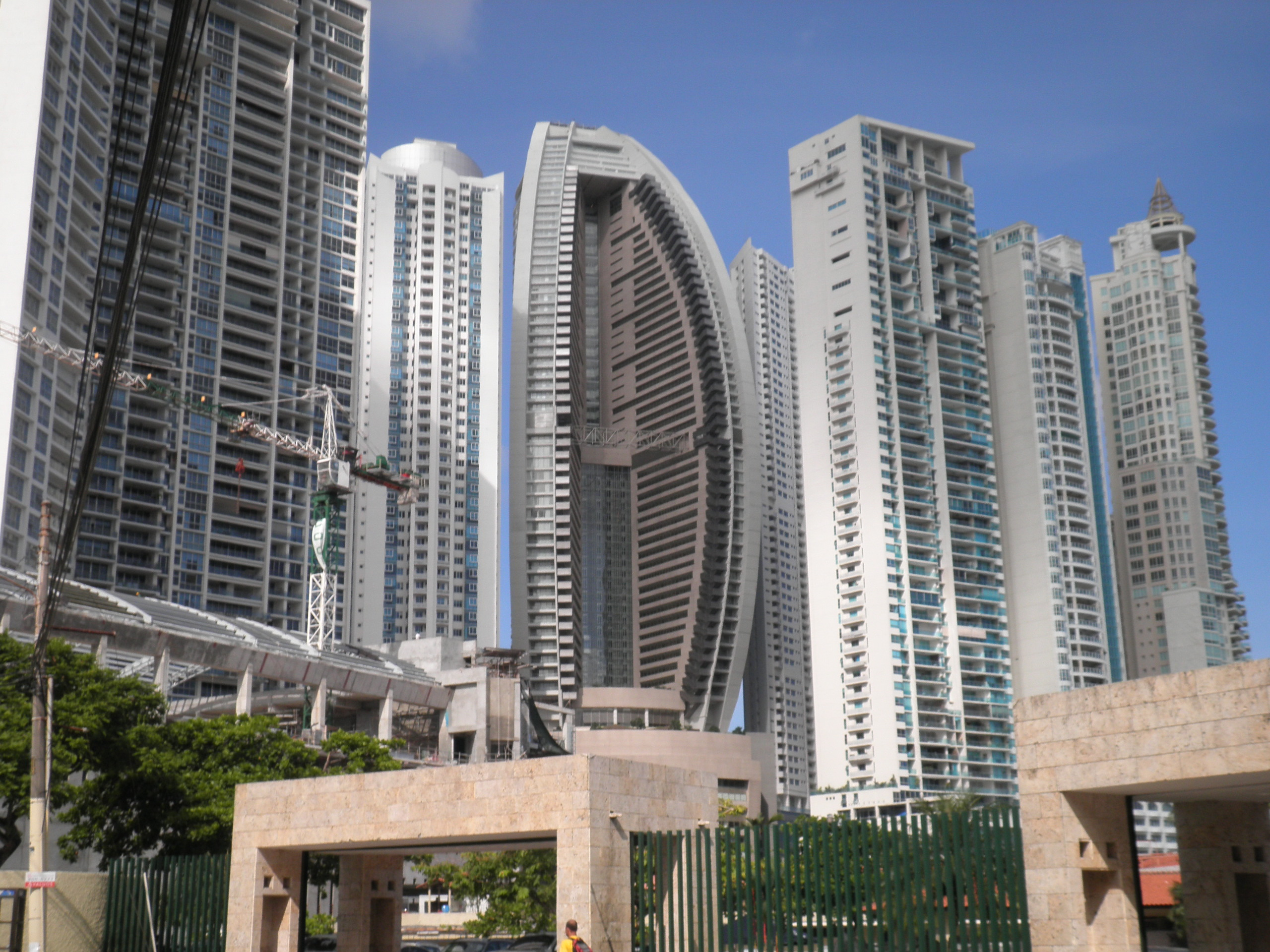
Skyscrapers in Punta Pacífica

As the economic and financial center of the country, Panama City's economy is service-based, heavily weighted toward banking, commerce, and tourism. The economy depends significantly on trade and shipping activities associated with the Panama Canal and port facilities in Balboa. Panama's status as a convergence zone for capital from around the world due to the canal helped the city establish itself as a prime location for offshore banking and tax planning. Consequently, the economy has relied on accountants and lawyers who help global corporations navigate the regulatory landscape. The city has benefited from significant economic growth in recent years, mainly due to the ongoing expansion of the Panama Canal, an increase in real estate investment, and a relatively stable banking sector. There are around eighty banks in the city, at least fifteen of which are local.

Panama City is responsible for the production of approximately 55% of the country's GDP. This is because most Panamanian businesses and premises are in the city and its metro area. It is a stopover for other destinations in the country, as well as a transit point and tourist destination in itself.

Tourism is one of the most important economic activities in terms of revenue generation. This sector of the economy has seen a great deal of growth since the transfer of the Panama Canal Zone at the end of the twentieth century. The number of hotel rooms increased by more than ten-fold, from 1,400 in 1997 to more than 15,000 in 2013, while the number of annual visitors increased from 457,000 in 1999 to 1.4 million in 2011. The city's hotel occupancy rate has always been relatively high, reaching the second highest for any city outside the United States in 2008, after Perth, Australia, and followed by Dubai. However, hotel occupancy rates have dropped since 2009, probably due to the opening of many new luxury hotels. Several international hotel chains, such as Le Méridien, Radisson, and RIU, have opened or plan to open new hotels in the city, along with those previously operating under Marriott, Sheraton, InterContinental, and other foreign and local brands. The Trump Organization built the Trump Ocean Club, its first investment in Latin America, in 2006 and it is the tallest building in the city. In 2018 it was renamed The Bahia Grand Panama following falling occupancy rates associated with the declining brand value of the Trump name. Meanwhile, it is a JW Marriott property. Hilton Worldwide opened a Hilton Garden Inn in El Cangrejo, and in 2013, The Panamera, the second Waldorf Astoria Hotel in Latin America.

Land reclamation projects have created additional new land for highways, housing, and parkland developments, Cinta Costera.

== Demographics ==
The city proper has 410,354 inhabitants in 13 corregimientos. There are 13 others that form the larger Panama District. The inhabitants of Panama City are commonly referred to as capitalinos and include large numbers of mestizos (70%), people with mixed Caribbean and European/Amerindian ancestry (14%), white people (10%), Amerindians (6%), as well as Afro-Panamanians. There is a great deal of cultural diversity within the city, which manifests itself in the wide variety of languages commonly spoken, such as German, Portuguese, French, Arabic, Chinese, Hebrew and English, in addition to Spanish.

=== Population by corregimiento ===
Panama City within Panama District

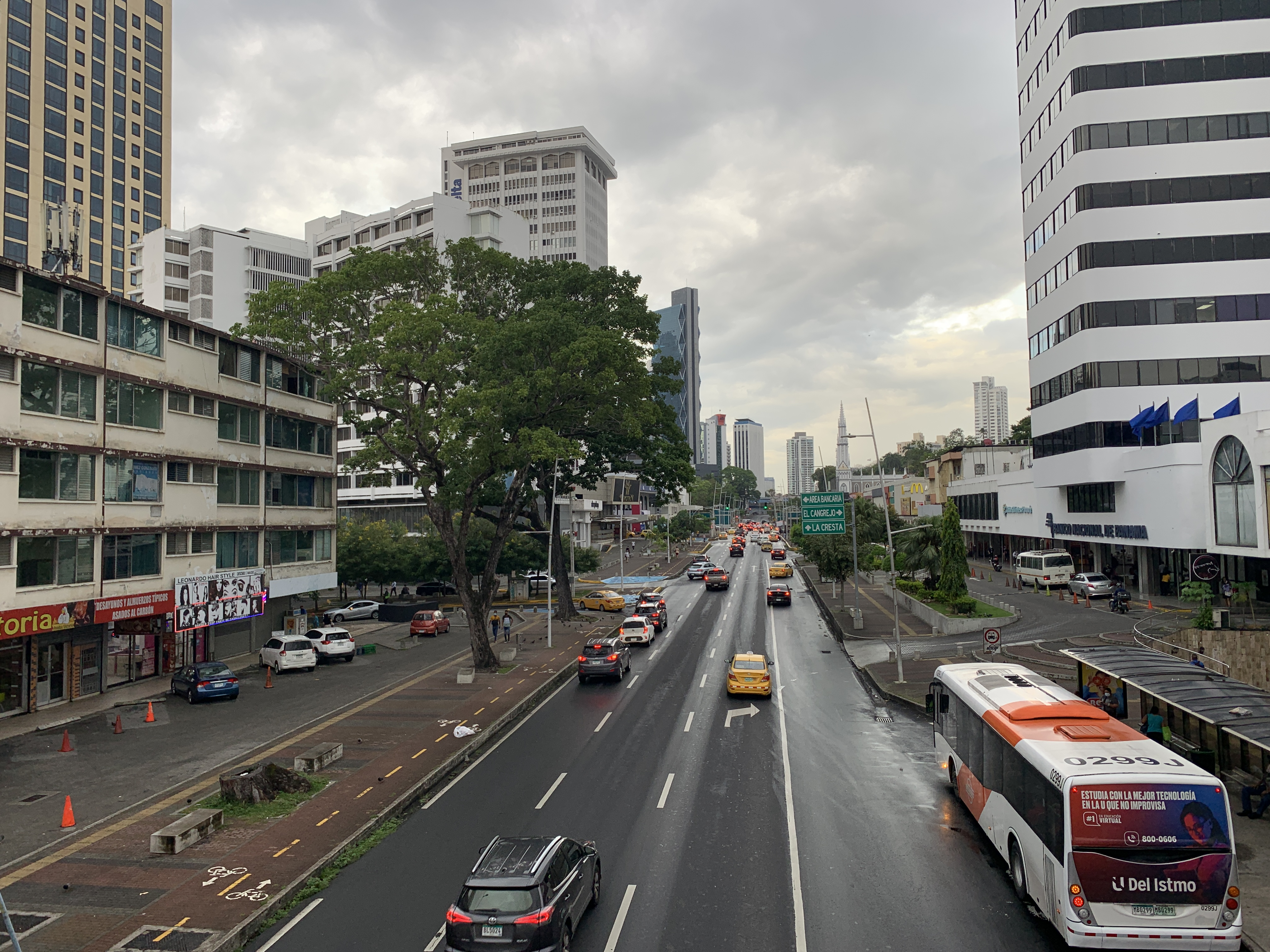
Bella Vista

Corregimientos of Panama City
Corregimiento	Area (km^{2})	Population (2023)	Density (per km^{2})
San Felipe	0.3	1,258	4,089.0
El Chorrillo	0.5	16,335	33,264.4
Santa Ana	0.8	13,495	17,049.9
Calidonia	1.8	17,300	9,721.3
Curundú	1.2	15,458	12,861.2
Betania	8.2	42,199	5,124.5
Bella Vista	4.6	33,710	7,358.4
Pueblo Nuevo	3.1	24,167	7,709.0
San Francisco	6.7	61,290	9,210.1
Parque Lefevre	7.2	42,832	5,923.7
Río Abajo	3.8	28,045	7,344.3
Juan Díaz	19.8	56,583	2,856.7
Pedregal	28.5	57,682	2,021.5
Panama City	86.6	410,354	4,750

== Culture ==
=== World Heritage Sites ===
==== Panamá Viejo ====
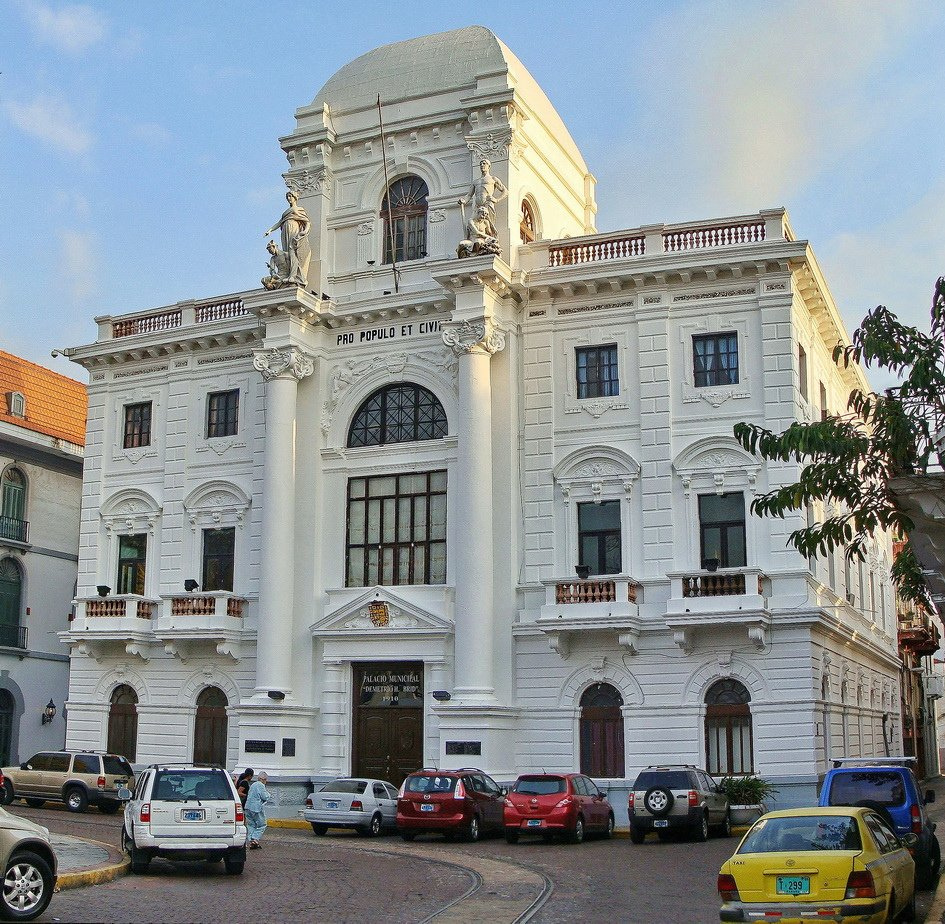
City Hall of Panama City

Panamá Viejo ("Old Panama") is the name used for the architectural vestiges of the Monumental Historic Complex of the first Spanish city founded on the Pacific coast of the Americas by Pedro Arias de Ávila on 15 August 1519. This city was the starting point for the expeditions that conquered the Inca Empire in Peru in 1532. It was a stopover point on one of the most important trade routes in the history of the American continent, leading to the famous fairs of Nombre de Dios and Portobelo, where most of the gold and silver that Spain took from the Americas passed through.

==== Casco Viejo or Casco Antiguo ====
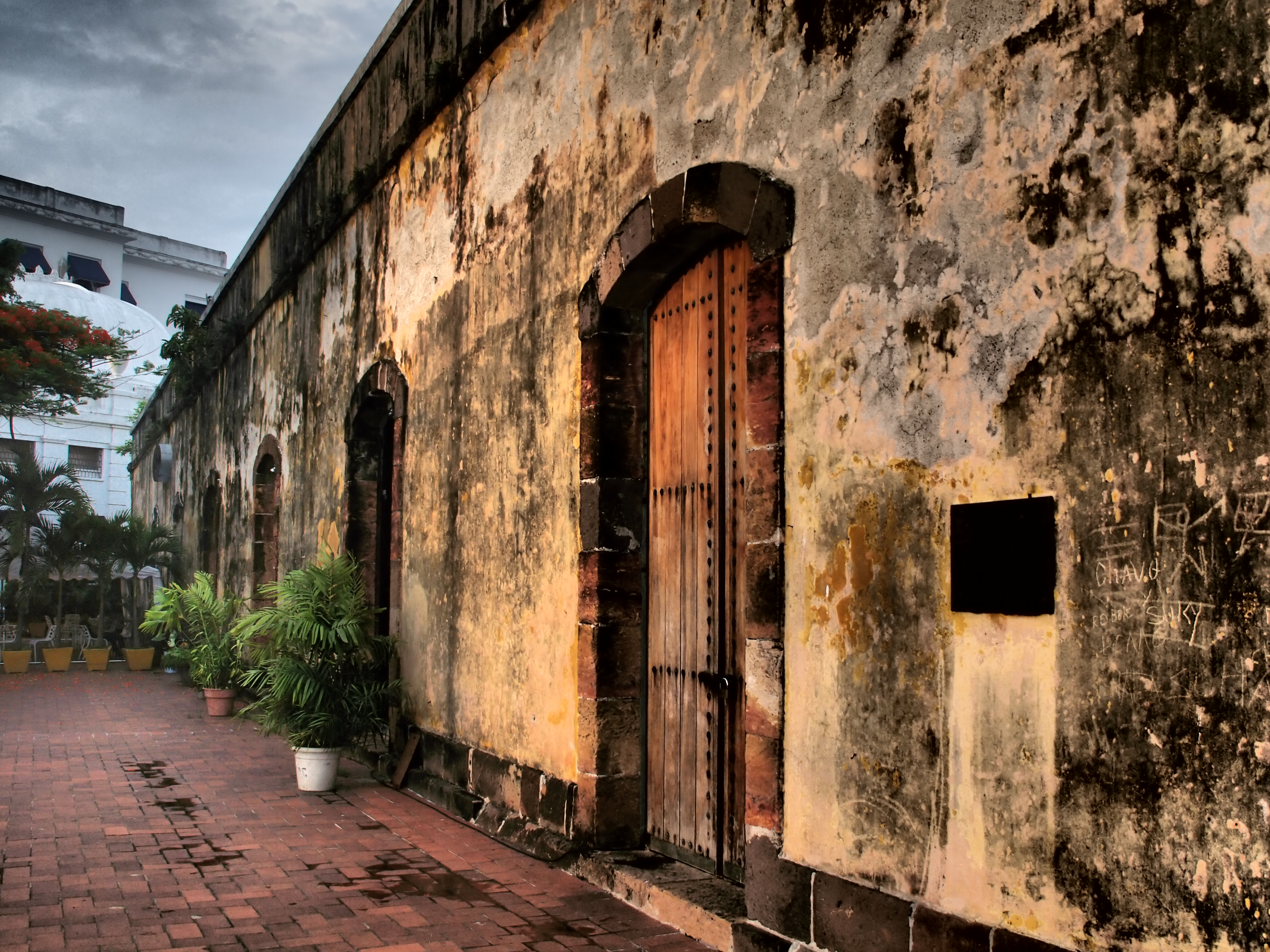
Las Bóvedas is the name commonly known to the remains of the colonial Walls surrounding the Plaza de Francia in Panama City.

Built and settled in 1671 after the destruction of Panama Viejo by the privateer Henry Morgan, the historic district of Panama City (known as Casco Viejo, Casco Antiguo or San Felipe) was conceived as a walled city to protect its settlers against future pirate attacks. It was designated a World Heritage Site by UNESCO in 2003.

Casco Antiguo displays a mix of architectural styles that reflect the country's cultural diversity: Caribbean, Republican, art deco, French, and colonial architecture mix in a site comprising around 800 buildings. Most of Panama City's main monuments are in Casco Antiguo, including the Salón Bolivar, the National Theater (founded in 1908), Las Bóvedas, and Plaza de Francia. There are also many Catholic buildings, such as the Metropolitan Cathedral, the La Merced Church, and the St. Philip Neri Church. The distinctive golden altar at St. Joseph Church was one of the few items saved from Panama Viejo during the 1671 pirate siege. It was buried in mud during the siege and then secretly transported to its present location.

The Cinta Costera 3 in Casco Viejo

Undergoing redevelopment and gentrification, the old quarter has become one of the city's main tourist attractions, second only to the Panama Canal. Both government and private sectors are working on its restoration. President Ricardo Martinelli built an extension to the Cinta Costera maritime highway viaduct in 2014 named "Cinta Costera 3" around the Casco Antiguo.

Before the Cinta Costera 3 project was built there were protests. Much of the controversy surrounding the project involved the possibility that Casco Viejo would lose its World Heritage status. On 28 June 2012, UNESCO decided that Casco Viejo will not be put on the List of World Heritage Sites in Danger.

=== Literature ===
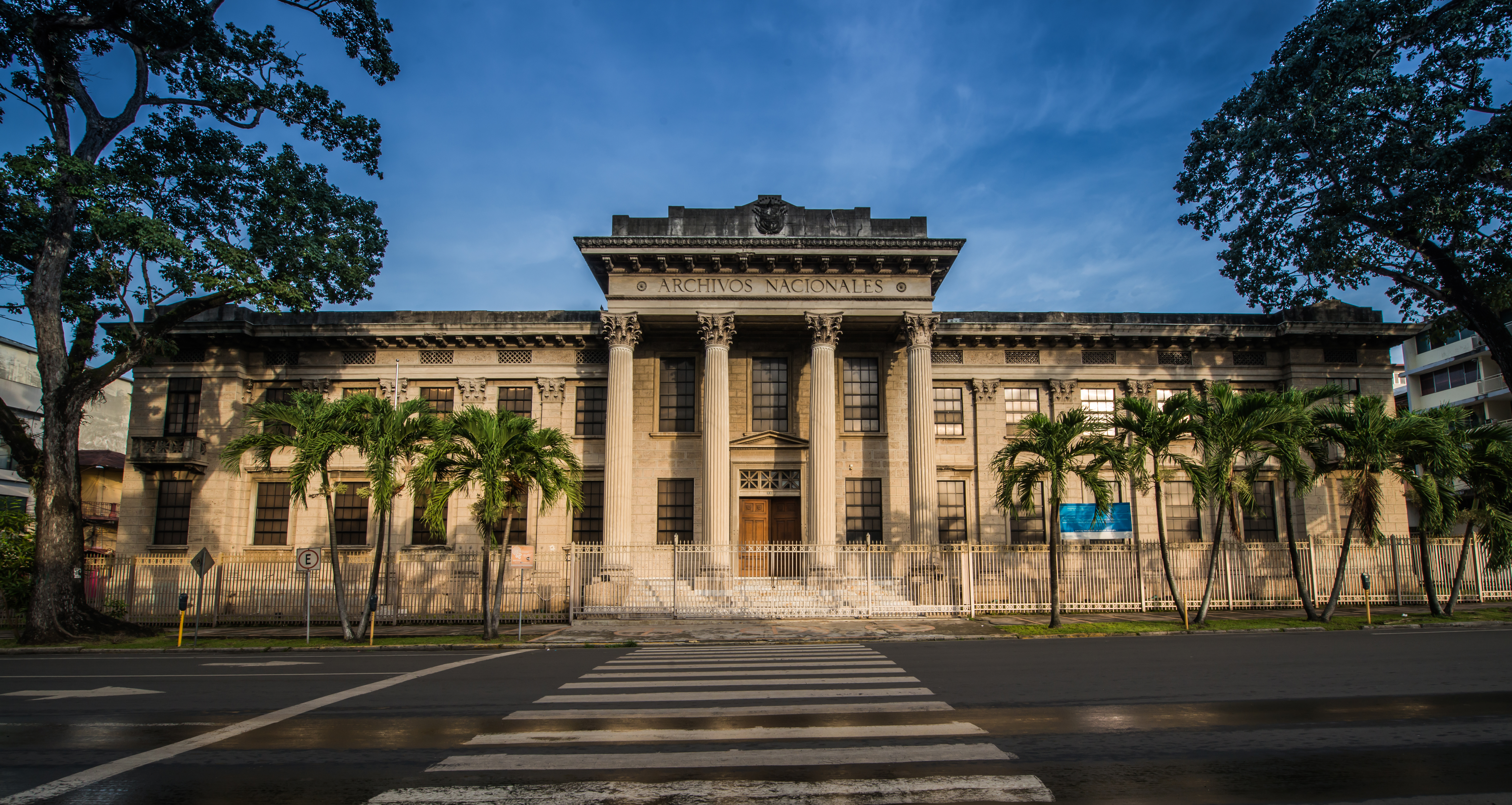
National Archives of Panama

According to Professor Rodrigo Miró, the first story about Panama was written by Gonzalo Fernández de Oviedo y Valdés and published as part of the Historia General y Natural de Las Indias in 1535. Some authors born in Panamá city are Manuel María Ayala (1785–1824), Amelia Denis de Icaza (1836–1911), Darío Herrera (1870–1914), Ricardo Miró (1883–1940), Gaspar Octavio Hernández (1893–1918), Demetrio Korsi (1899–1957), Ricardo Bermúdez (1914–2000), Joaquín Beleño (1921–88), Ernesto Endara (1932–), Diana Morán (1932–87), Rosa María Britton (1936–2019), José Córdova (1937–), Pedro Rivera (1939–), Moravia Ochoa López (1941–), Roberto Fernández Iglesias (1941–), Juan David Morgan (1942 –), Jarl Ricardo Babot (1946–), Giovanna Benedetti (1949–), Édgar Soberón Torchia (1951-), Manuel Orestes Nieto (1951–), Moisés Pascual (1955–), Nyra Soberón Torchia (1955-), Héctor Miguel Collado (1960–), David Robinson Orobio (1960–), Katia Chiari (1969–), Carlos Oriel Wynter Melo (1971–), José Luis Rodríguez Pittí (1971–), Arturo Wong Sagel (1980–) and Sofía Santim (1982–).

=== Art ===
One of the most important Panamanian artists is Alfredo Sinclair. He has worked for over 50 years in abstract art and has produced one of the most important artistic collections in the country. His daughter, Olga Sinclair, has also followed in his footsteps and has become another force in Panamanian art. Another very prominent Panamanian artist is Guillermo Trujillo, known worldwide for his abstract surrealism. Brooke Alfaro is a Panamanian artist known throughout the world for his uniquely rendered oil paintings. Another prominent artist is Mario Calvit, known as one of the great painters of the generation that flourished in the country between the decades of 1950 and 1970.

=== Tourism ===
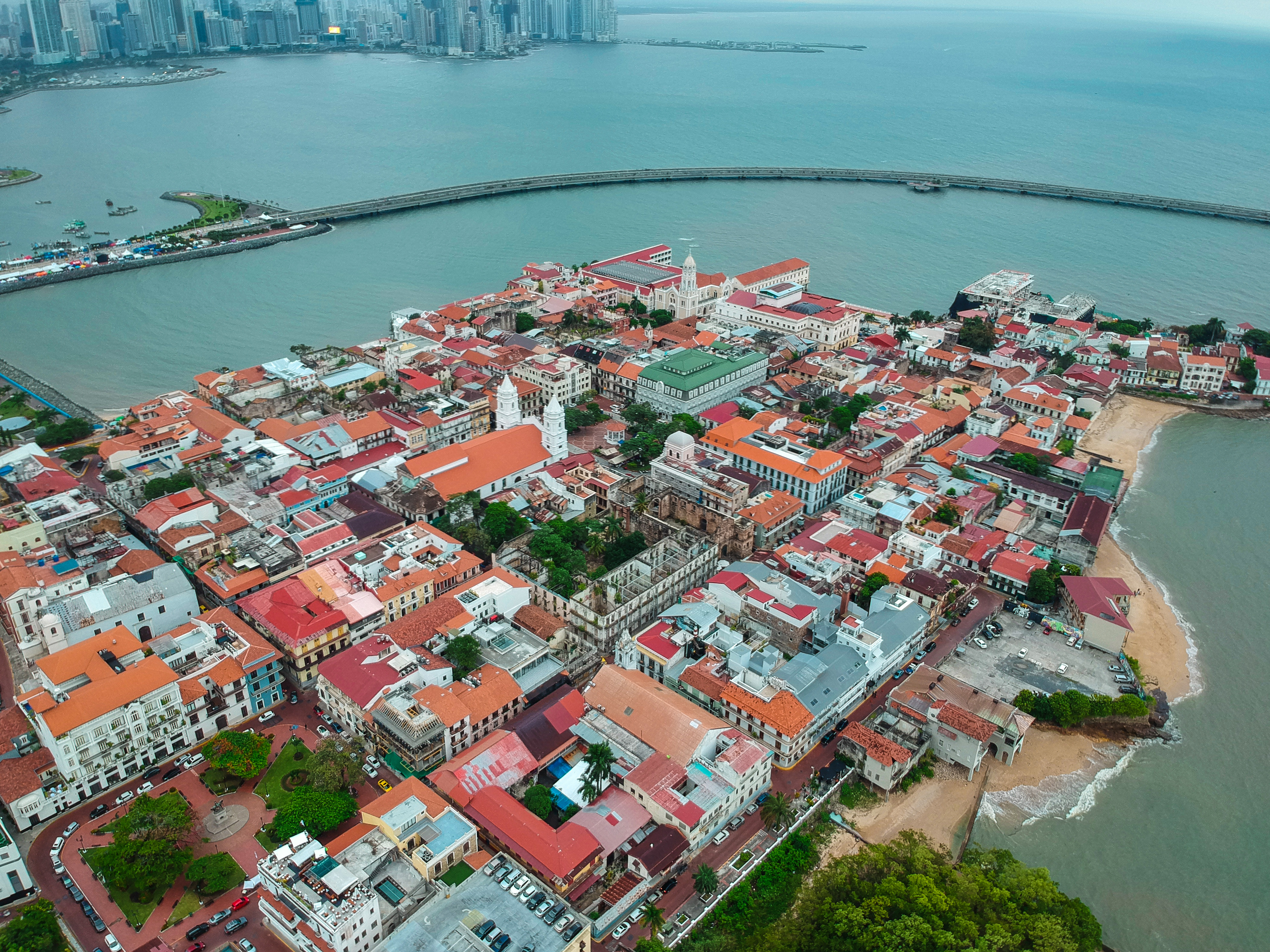
Old town (San Felipe district)

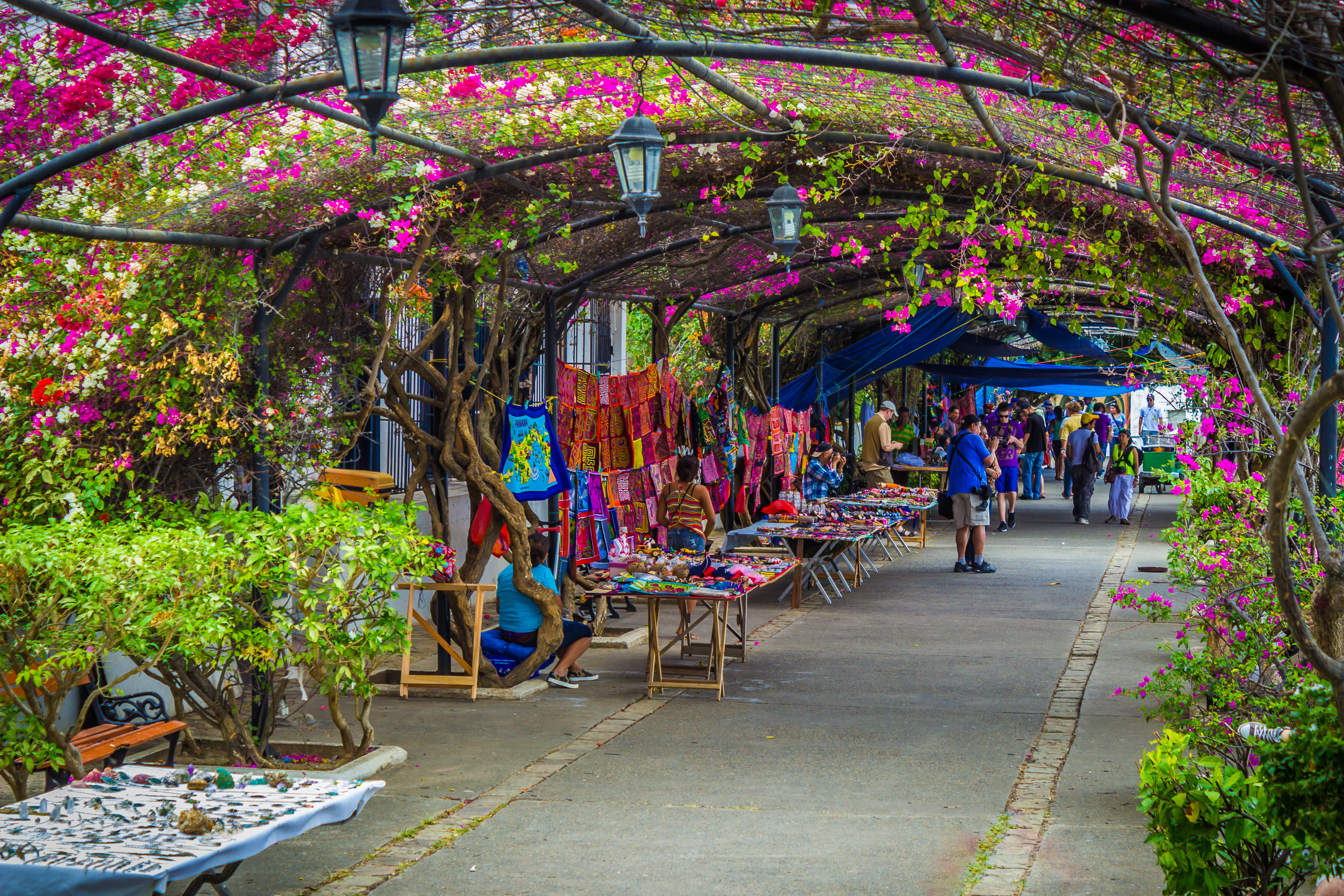
Paseo Esteban Huertas

Tourism in Panama City includes many different historic sites and locations related to the operation of the Panama Canal. A few of these sites are the following:

- Las Bóvedas ("The Vaults"), a waterfront promenade jutting out into the Pacific;
- The National Institute of Culture Building and the French embassy across from it;
- The Cathedral at Plaza de la Catedral;
- Teatro Nacional (National Theatre of Panama), an intimate performance center with outstanding natural acoustics and seating for about 800 guests;
- Museo del Canal Interoceánico (Interoceanic Canal Museum); and
- Palacio de las Garzas (Heron's Palace), the official name of the presidential palace, named for the numerous herons that inhabit the building.
- Miraflores Visitors Center at the Miraflores set of Locks on the Pacific Side, with a museum and a simulator of a ship cruising the canal.
- Calzada de Amador (Amador Causeway), a land-bridge built with rocks excavated during the construction of the Panama Canal.

In addition to these tourist attractions, Panama City offers many different options when it comes to hotel accommodations, including the first Waldorf Astoria hotel to open in Latin America, and many small boutique style hotels that have smaller numbers of guest rooms and offer a more intimate vacation. Nightlife in the city is centered around the Calle Uruguay and Casco Viejo neighborhoods. These neighborhoods contain a variety of different bars and nightclubs that cater to the tourists visiting the city.

One of the newer tourist areas of the city is the area immediately east of the Pacific entrance of the canal, known as the Amador Causeway. This area is being developed as a tourist center and nightlife destination. The Smithsonian Tropical Research Institute operates a station and a small museum open to the public at Culebra Point on the island of Naos. A new museum, the Biomuseo, was recently completed on the causeway in 2014. It was designed by the American architect Frank Gehry, famous for the Guggenheim Museum Bilbao and the Disney Concert Hall in Los Angeles. Just outside the city limits is the Parque Municipal Summit. A new convention center called the Amador Convention Center is being built in Amador by CSCEC in a joint venture with a Panamanian company called CCG Cocige. The Panamanian ministry of Tourism hopes for the convention center to house 100 international events annually. There were plans (proposed by Panamanian president Juan Carlos Varela) to build in Amador a campus for the embassy of the People's Republic of China in Panama, however the plans were eventually dropped, due to criticism from the general public and fears that tourists could easily assume that Panama was Chinese territory. Varela in response said that Amador is an area that "must have more value".

The United States State Department notes the presence of crimes in the city, some of which include violent acts such as shootings, rape, armed robbery, and intentional kidnapping. The United States State Department also warns tourists about the purchasing of counterfeited or pirated goods, as they may be in violation of local Panamanian laws. In terms of LGBT rights in the city, same sex marriage is not recognized by the government but there are laws in place to prevent discrimination against the LGBT community.

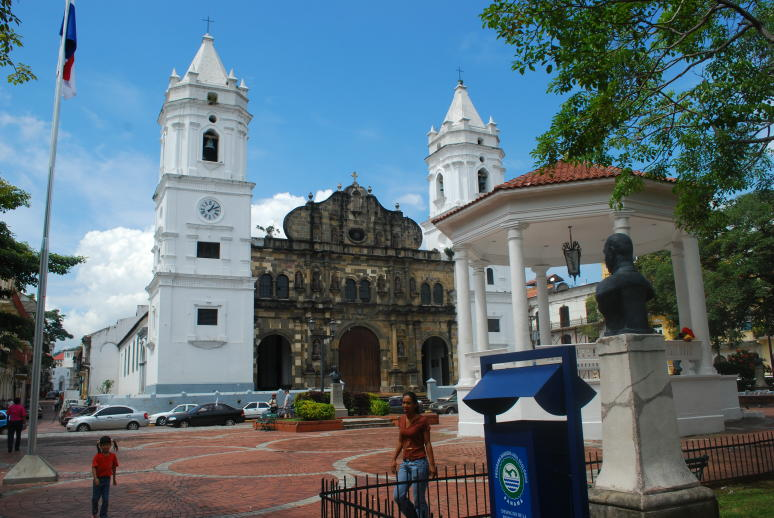
Plaza de la Independencia

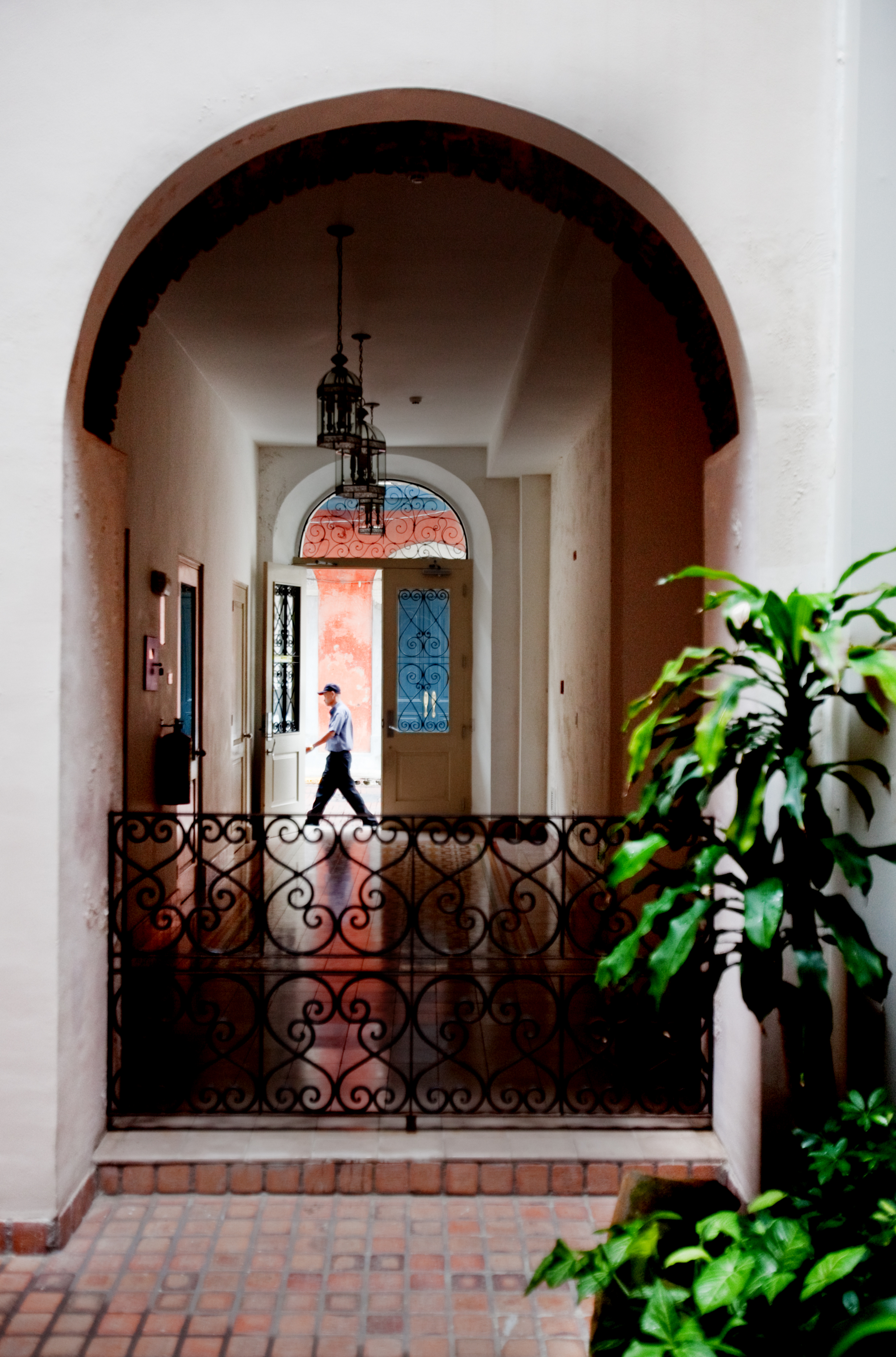
Archway and classic calicanto wall in a traditional house

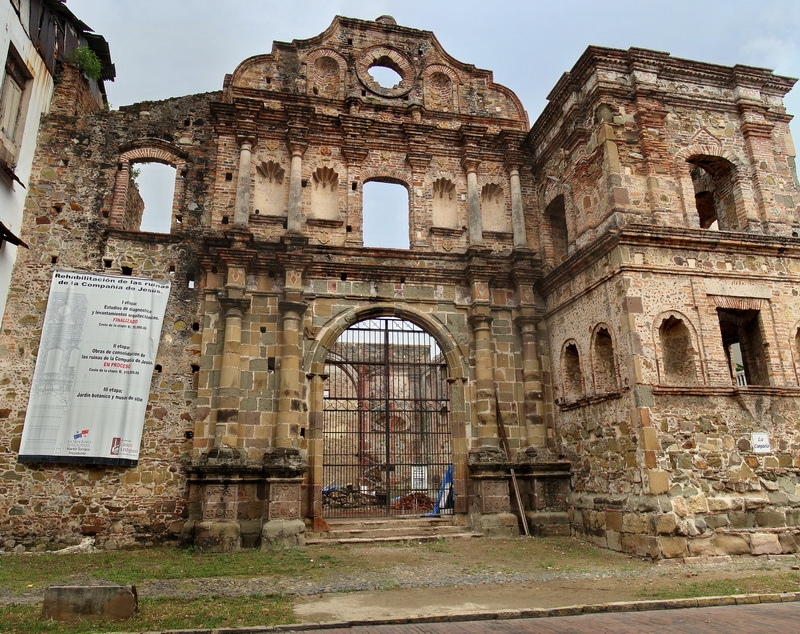
Compañía de Jesús, the ruins of an ancient convent of the Society of Jesus

== Sports ==
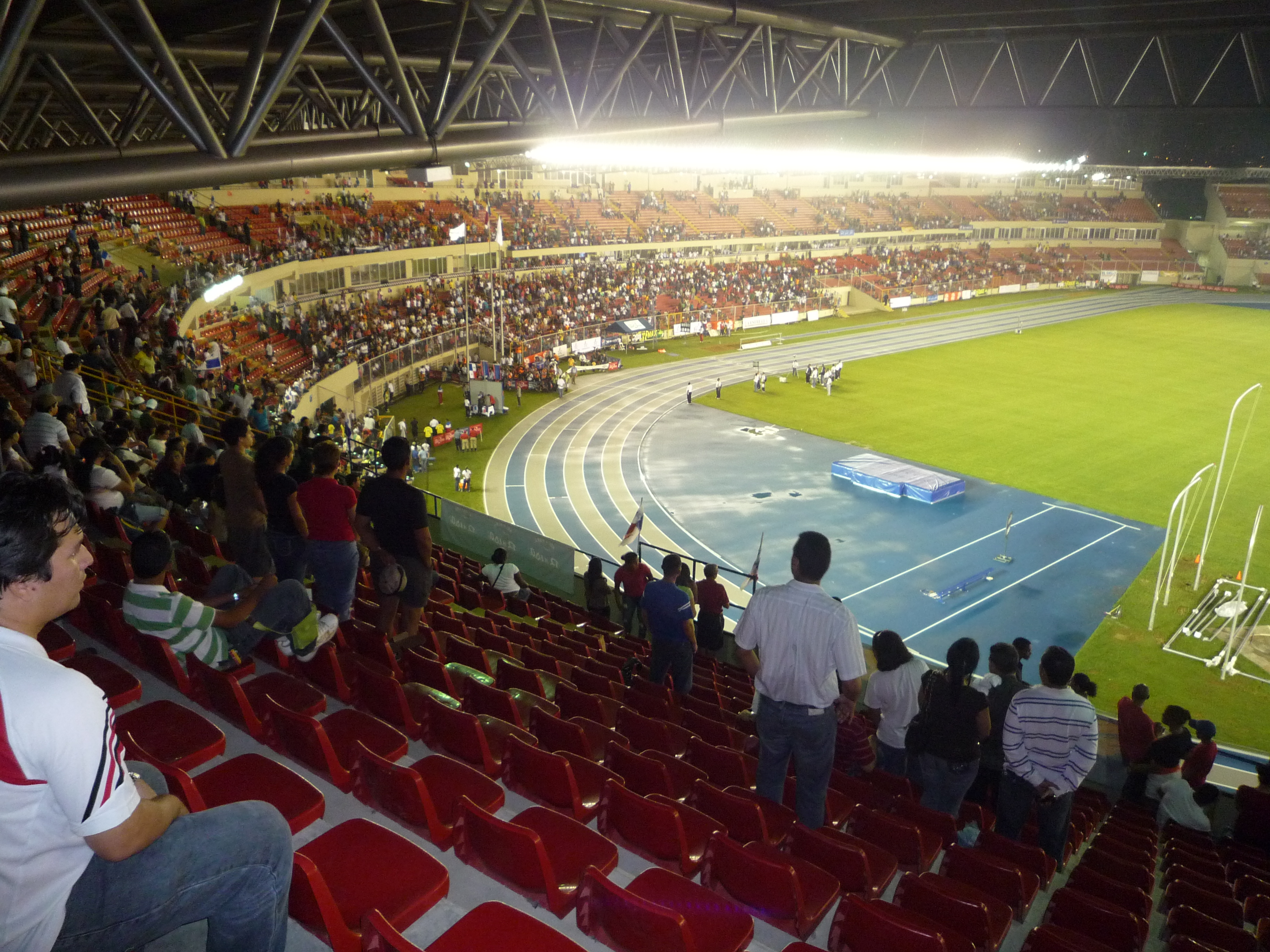
Rommel Fernández Soccer Stadium

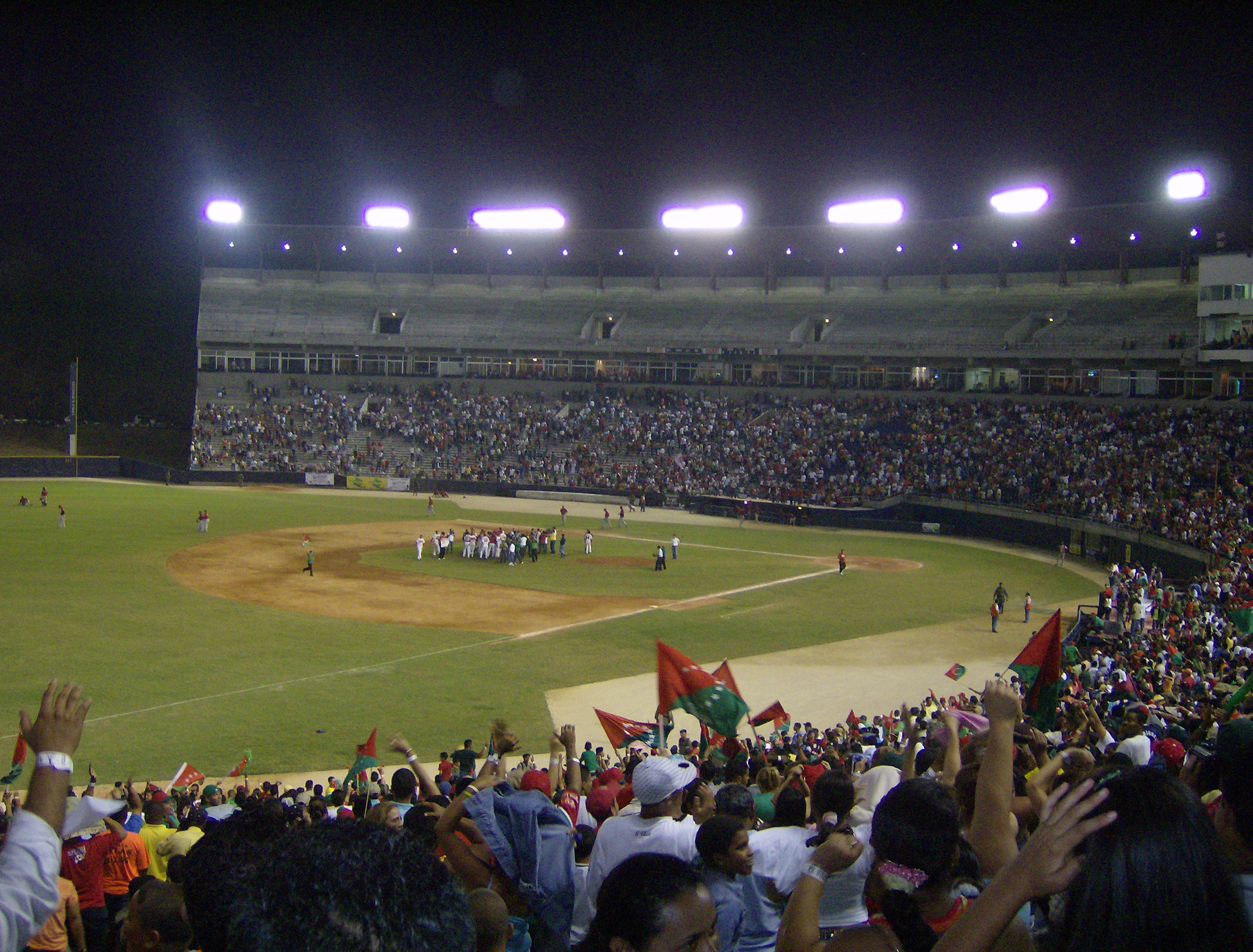
Rod Carew National Baseball Stadium

Throughout the 20th century, Panama City has excelled in boxing, baseball, basketball, and soccer. These sports have produced famous athletes such as Roberto Durán, Rommel Fernández, Rolando Blackman, Julio Dely Valdés, Mariano Rivera, and Rod Carew. Today, these sports have clubs and associations that manage their development in the city. Panama Metro is the city's baseball team. There are boxing training centers in different gyms throughout the city's neighborhoods. There are also many football clubs, such as:

- Alianza
- Chorrillo
- Plaza Amador
- Tauro
- Chepo
- San Francisco F.C.

The city has four professional teams in the country's second-level league, Liga Nacional de Ascenso:

- Atlético Nacional
- Deportivo Genesis
- Millenium
- Río Abajo

There are two main stadiums in Panama City, the National Baseball Stadium (also known as Rod Carew Stadium) and the Rommel Fernández Stadium, with capacities of 27,000 and 32,000 respectively. Additionally, the Roberto Durán Arena has a capacity of 18,000.

== Education ==
The city has both public and private schools. Most private schools are bilingual (English and Spanish). Higher education is headed by two major public universities: the University of Panama and the Technological University of Panama. There are private universities, such as the Universidad Católica Santa María La Antigua, the Universidad Latina de Panama, the Universidad Latinoamericana de Ciencia y Tecnología (ULACIT), the Distance and Open University of Panama (UNADP), Universidad del Istmo Panama, the Universidad Maritima Internacional de Panama, and the Universidad Especializada de las Americas. Also, there are Panama Branches of the Nova Southeastern University (its main campus is in Ft. Lauderdale in Broward County, Florida); the University of Oklahoma; the Central Texas University; the University of Louisville which runs a sister campus in the city, and the Florida State University, which operates a broad curriculum program in an academic and technological park known as Ciudad del Saber.

== Healthcare ==
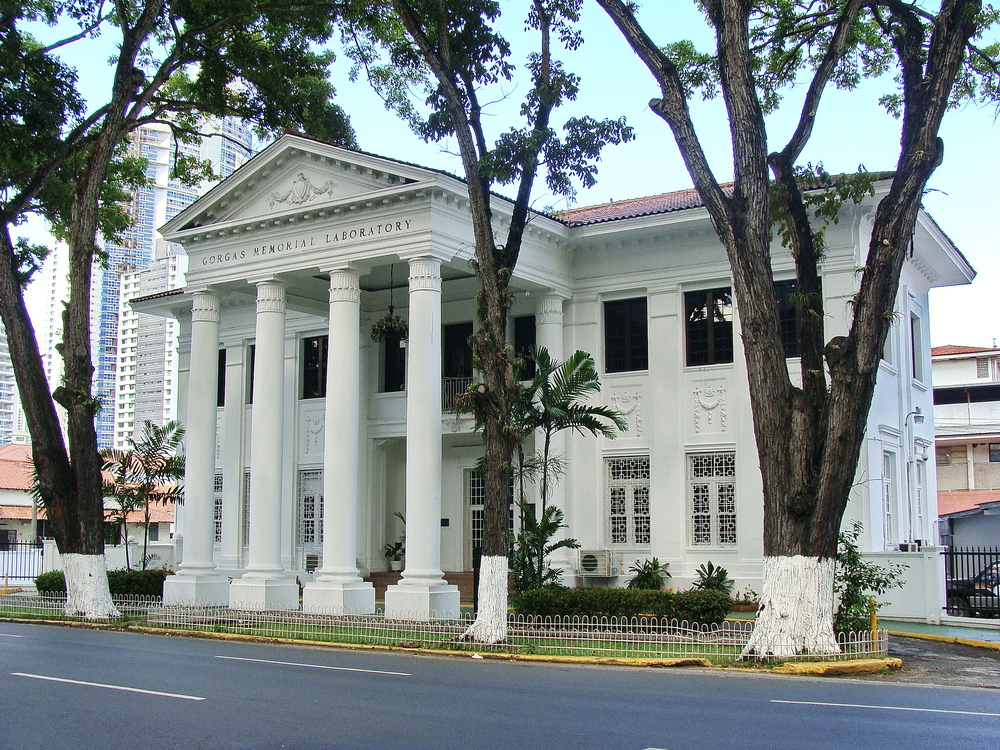
The Gorgas Memorial Institute for Health Studies

Panama City is home to at least 14 hospitals and an extensive network of public and private clinics, including the Hospital Santo Tomás, Hospital del Niño, Complejo Hospitalario Arnulfo Arias Madrid, Centro Médico Paitilla, Hospital Santa Fé, Hospital Nacional, Clinica Hospital San Fernando, and Hospital Punta Pacifica.

About 45% of the country's physicians are based in Panama City.

== Transportation ==
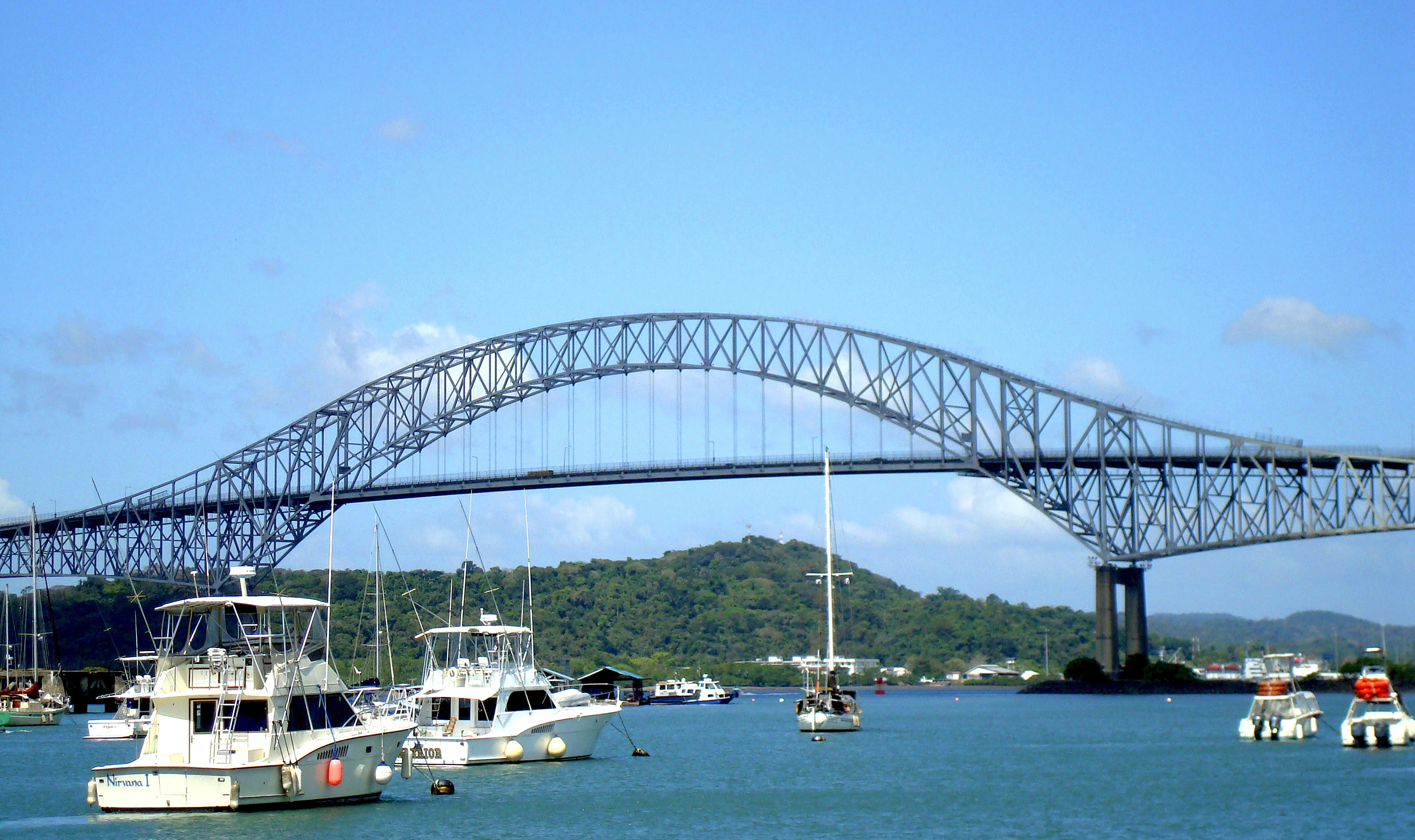
Puente de las Américas

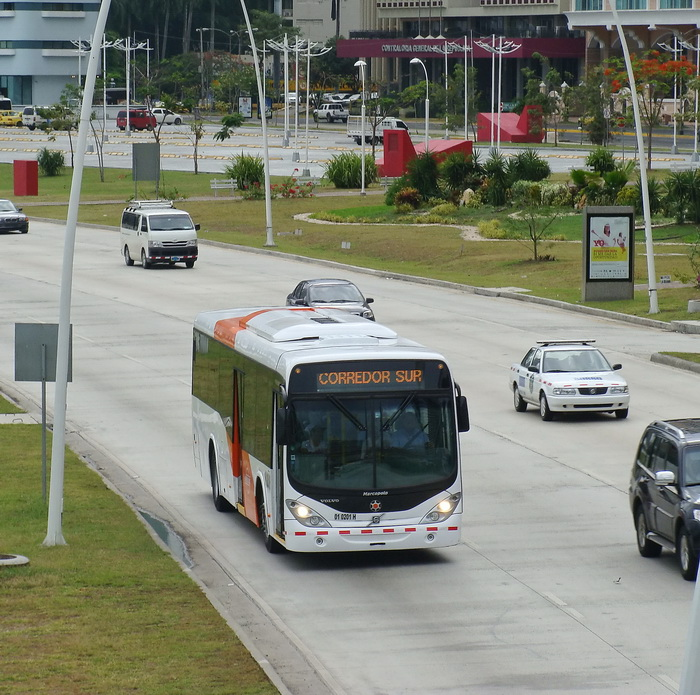
Metrobus, the public bus system

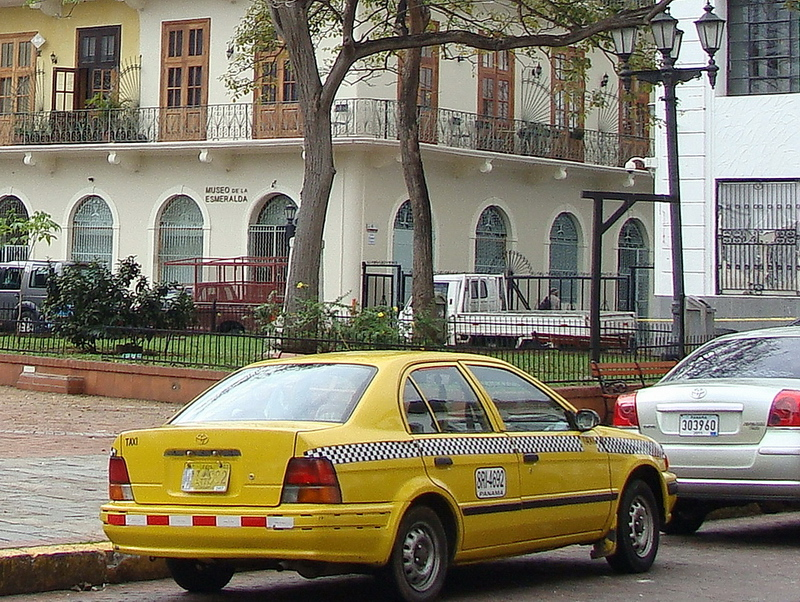
Taxi in Panama City

Panama's international airport, Tocumen International Airport is on the eastern outskirts of the city's metropolitan area. Two other airports serve Panama City: Panamá Pacífico, previously the Howard Air Force Base, and Marcos A. Gelabert, previously the Albrook Air Force Base. Pacífico serves Wingo, while Marcos A. Gelabert Airport is the main hub for AirPanama. Most other flights are served by Tocumen.

The Panama Metro is a rapid transit system in Panama City, which links the north and east sides of the metropolitan area to the city center. The Panama Metro currently has two operating lines. There is a third line currently under construction.

There are frequent traffic jams in Panama City due to the high levels of private transport ownership per kilometer of traffic lane. In an attempt to curb traffic jams, the Panama Metro, initially 14 km (9 mi) long and funded an increase in taxes, began operation in 2014.

The bus terminal in Ancon offers buses in and out of the city. Bus service is one of the most widely used forms of transportation in Panama. The terminal receives thousands of passengers daily from locations such as David, Chiriqui, and the central provinces of Herrera and Los Santos. The terminal also receives international passengers from Central America via the Pan-American Highway.

Panama City offers transportation services through yellow taxis. Taxis do not use a meter to measure fares, instead using a zone system for fares that is published by the Autoridad de Transito y Transporte Terrestre, Panama's transit authority. Taxis used to be red. Taxi drivers that charge more than usual are not uncommon. Many also participate in InDriver and Cabify. Uber has been the subject of controversy, with many taxi drivers demanding its cessation of operations in Panama City.

== International relations ==
Panama City is twinned with:

- Charleston, United States
- Davao City, Philippines
- Fort Lauderdale, United States
- Guadalajara, Mexico
- Imabari, Japan
- Incheon, South Korea
- Kaohsiung, Taiwan
- Liverpool, England
- Madrid, Spain
- Medellín, Colombia
- Montería, Colombia
- Johor Bahru, Malaysia
- San Diego, United States
- Taipei, Taiwan
- George Town, Penang, Malaysia

=== Union of Ibero-American Capital Cities ===
Panama City is part of the Union of Ibero-American Capital Cities.

== Gallery ==
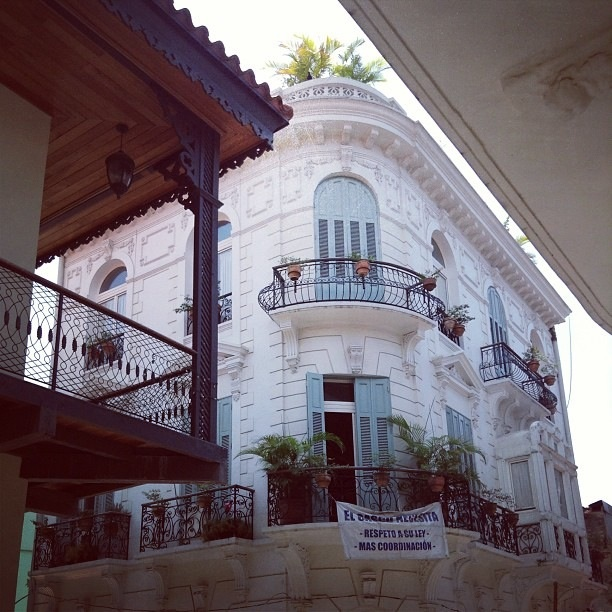
Architecture in Casco Viejo (Old Quarter)

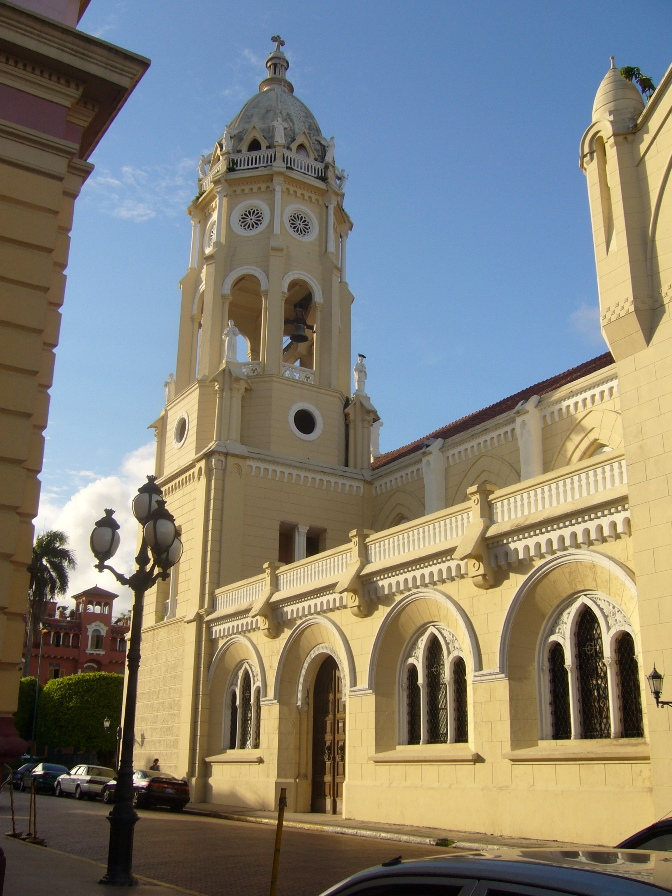
The belltower of the San Francisco de Asis Church.

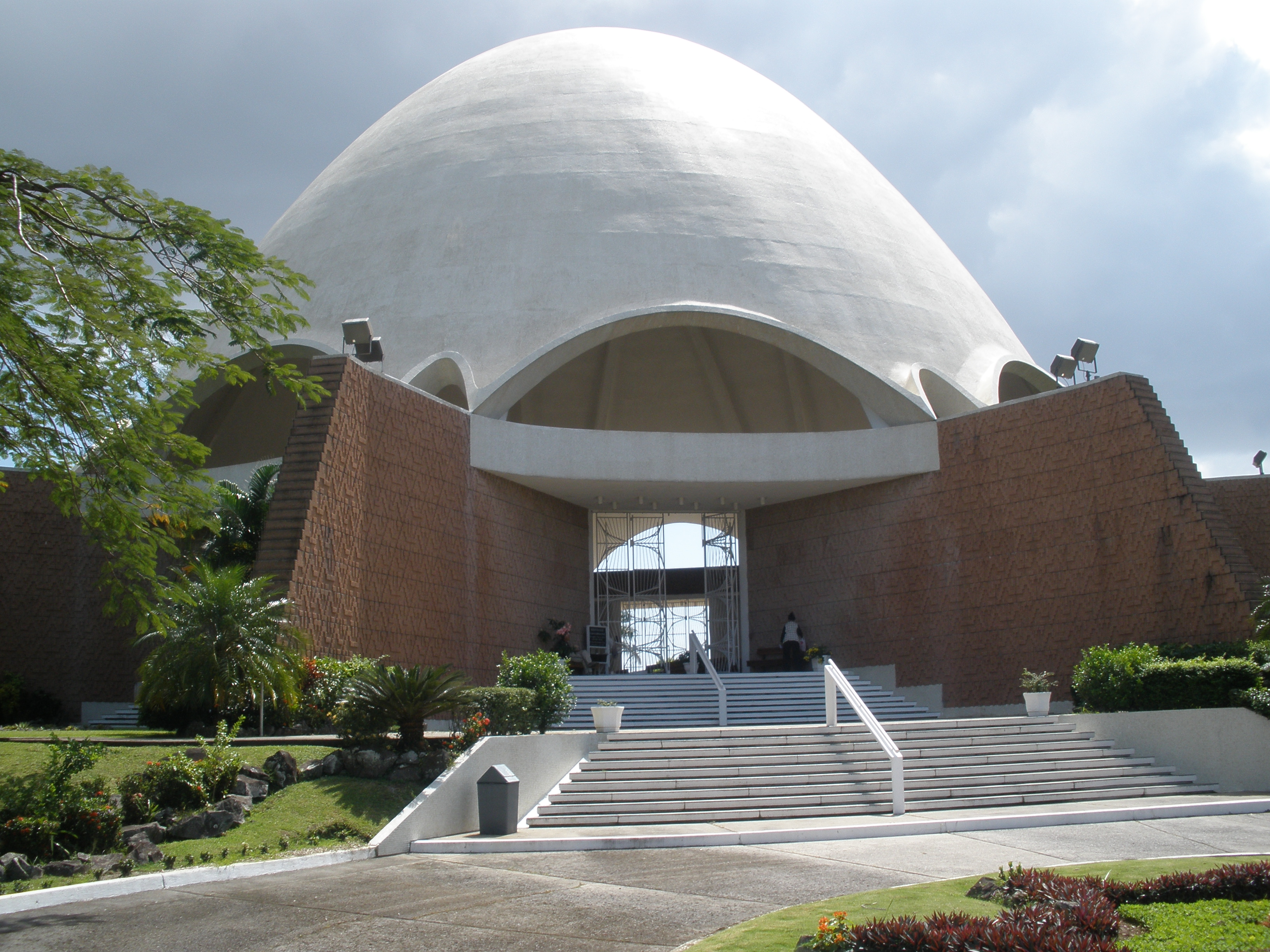
The Bahá'í House of Worship

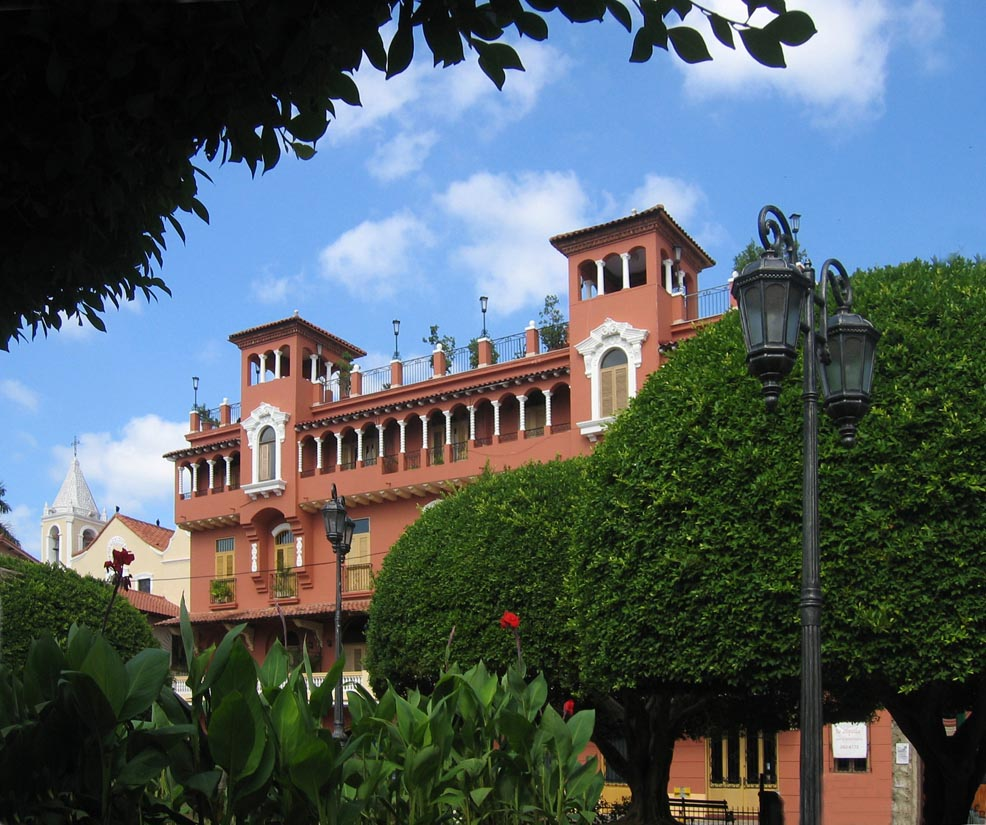
Plaza Bolivar in Casco Viejo

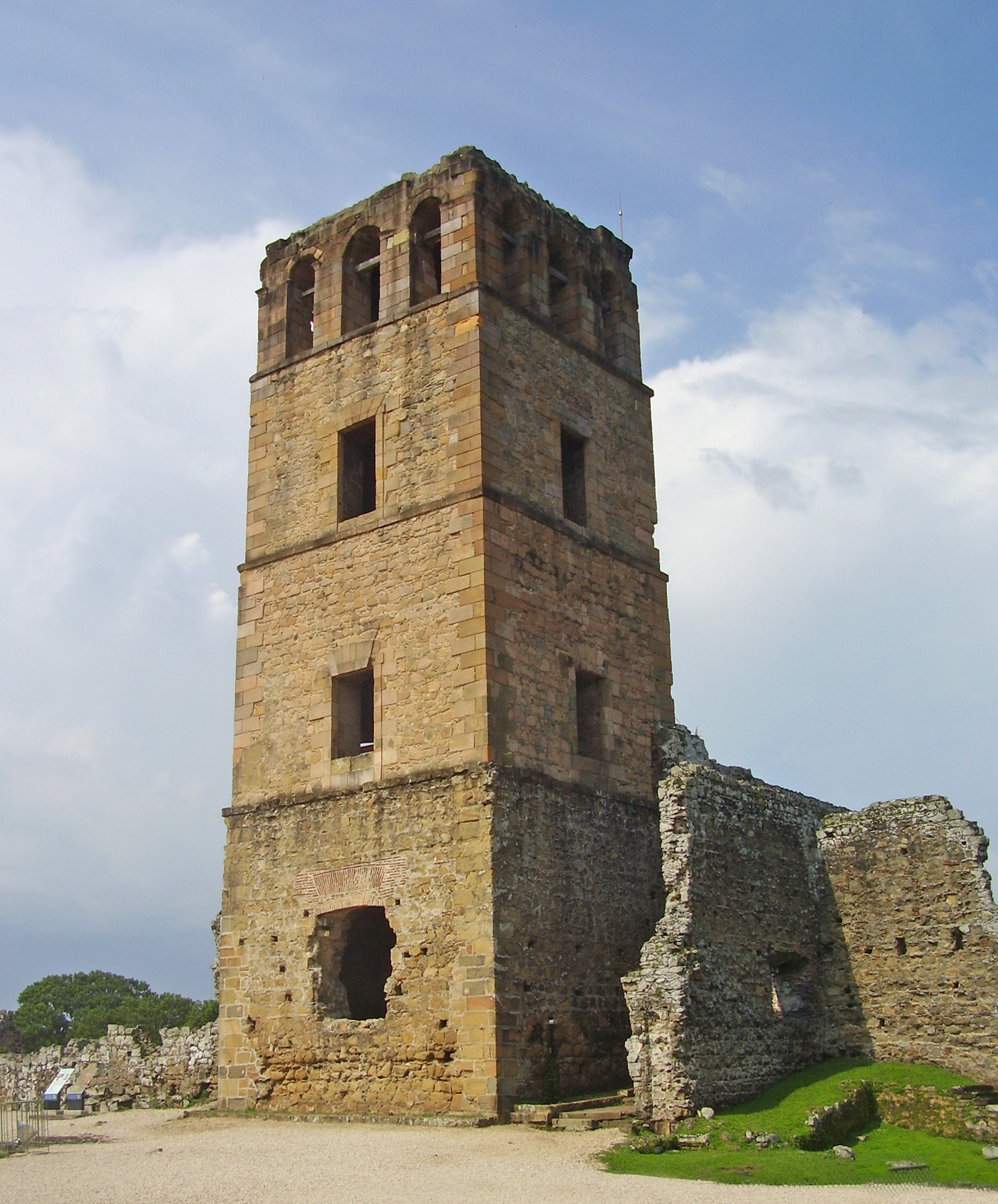
Ruins of the Old Panama Cathedral

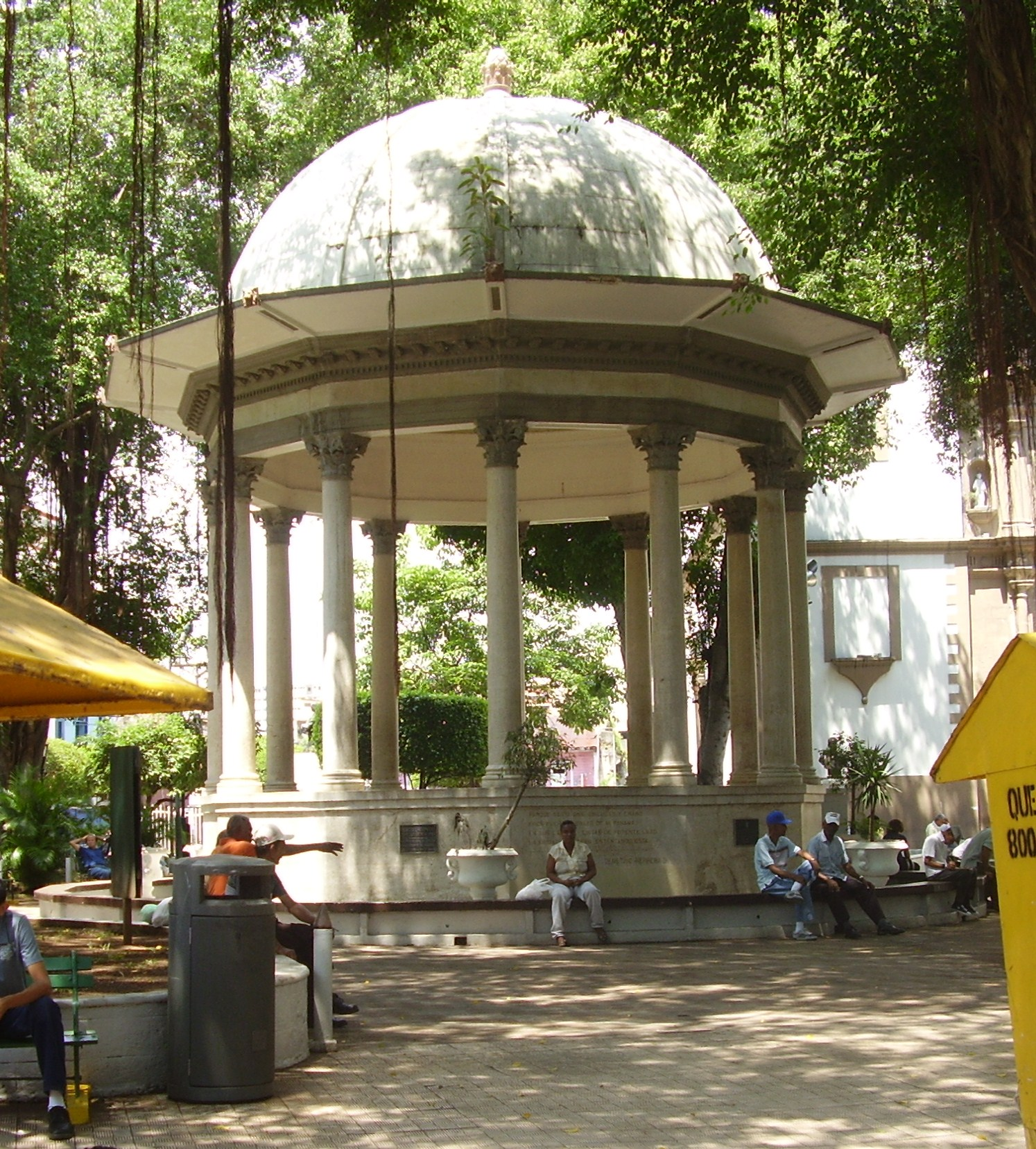
Santa Ana Park

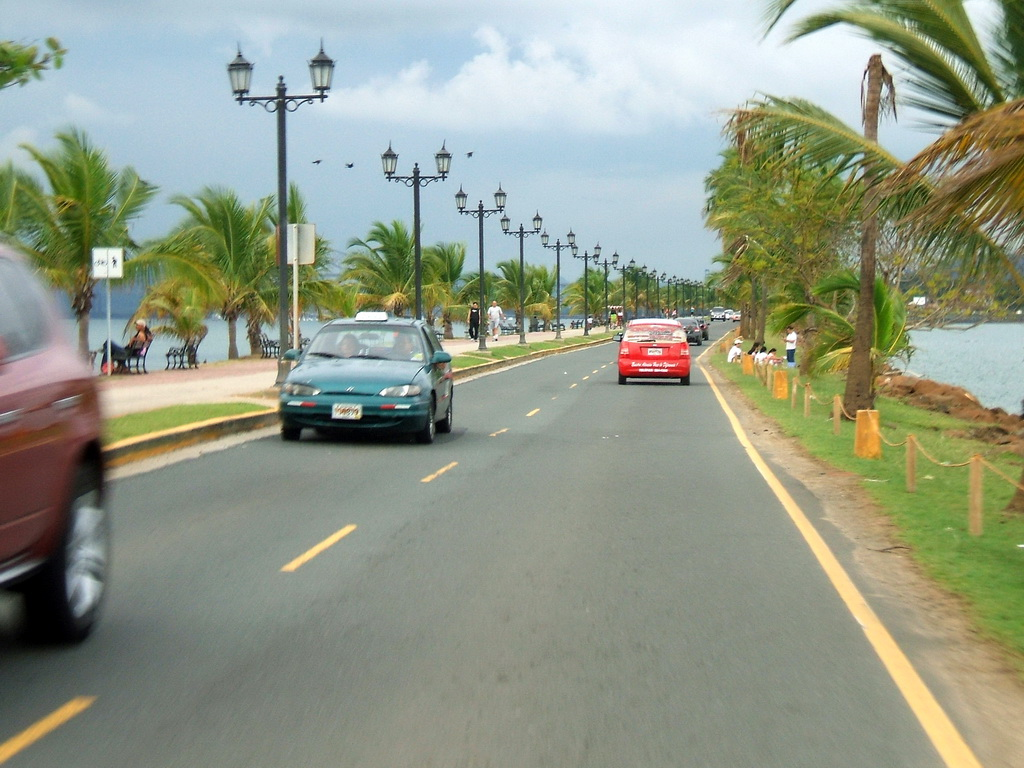
Causeway connecting Naos, Perico, and Flamenco Islands to the mainland

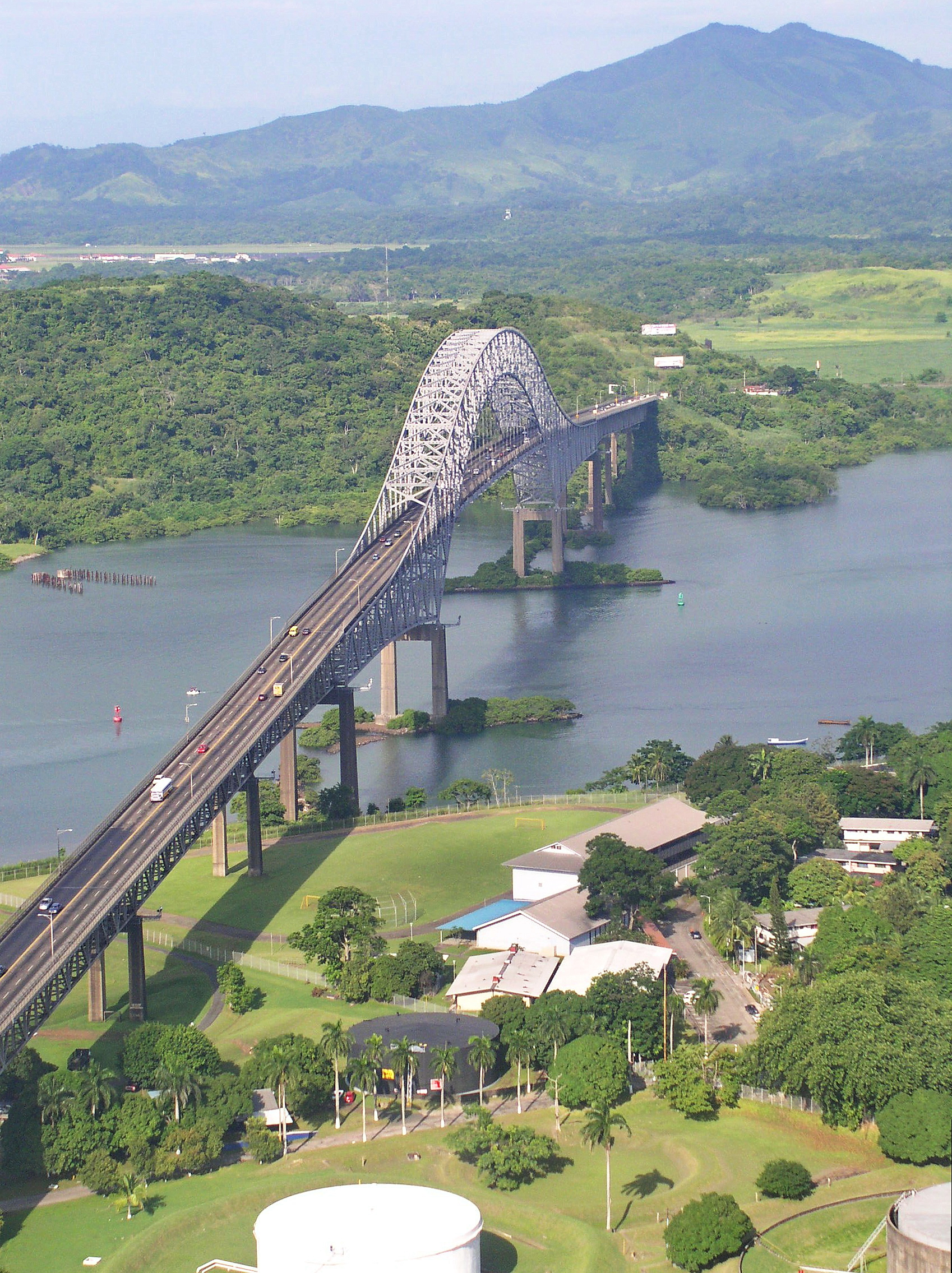
The Bridge of the Americas, at the Pacific entrance to the Panama Canal

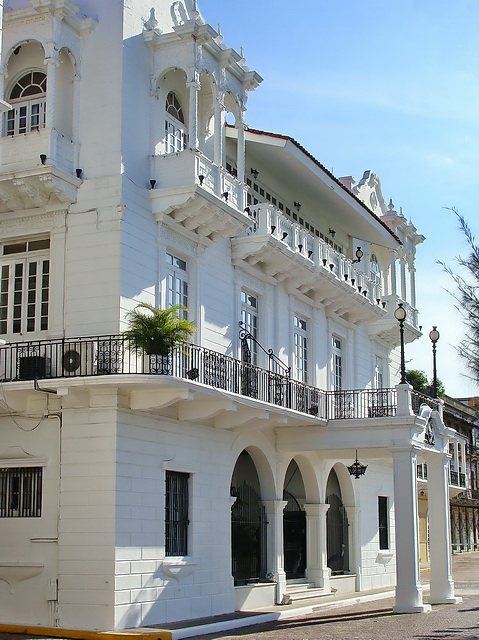
The Palace of the Herons, the official residence and office of the President of Panama

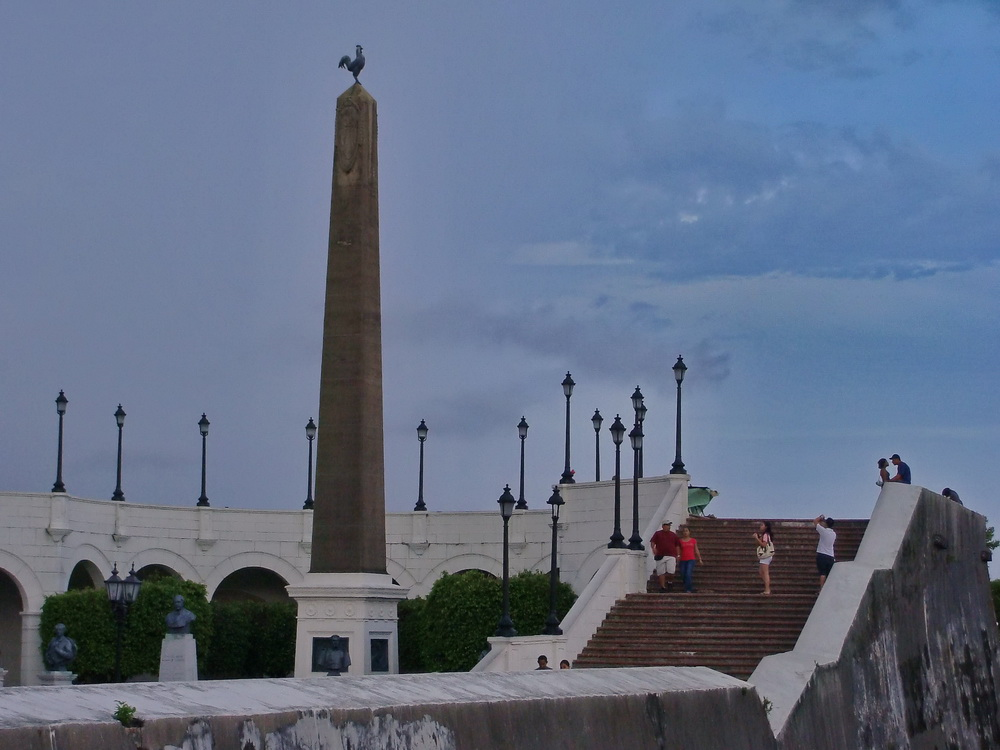
Plaza de Francia, a square in honor of the workers and French engineers who participated in the construction of the Panama Canal.

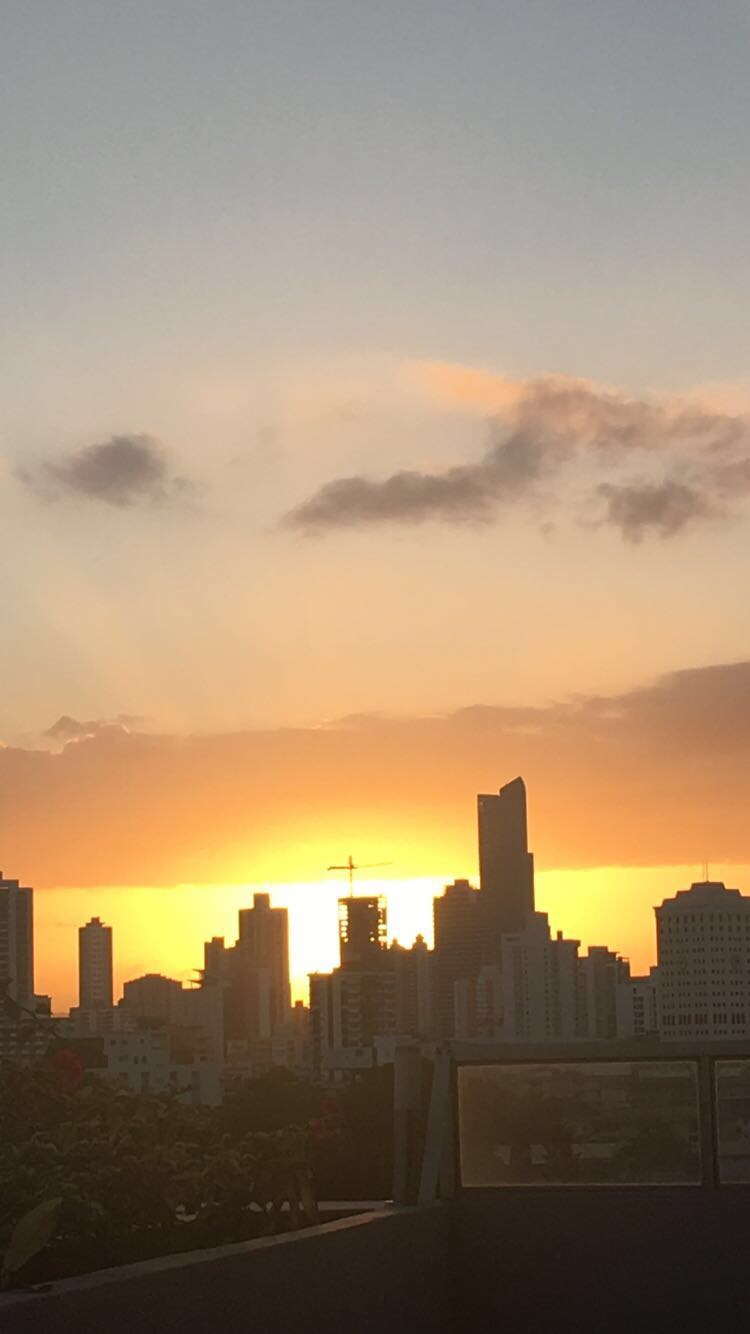
Obario neighborhood seen from San Francisco neighborhood

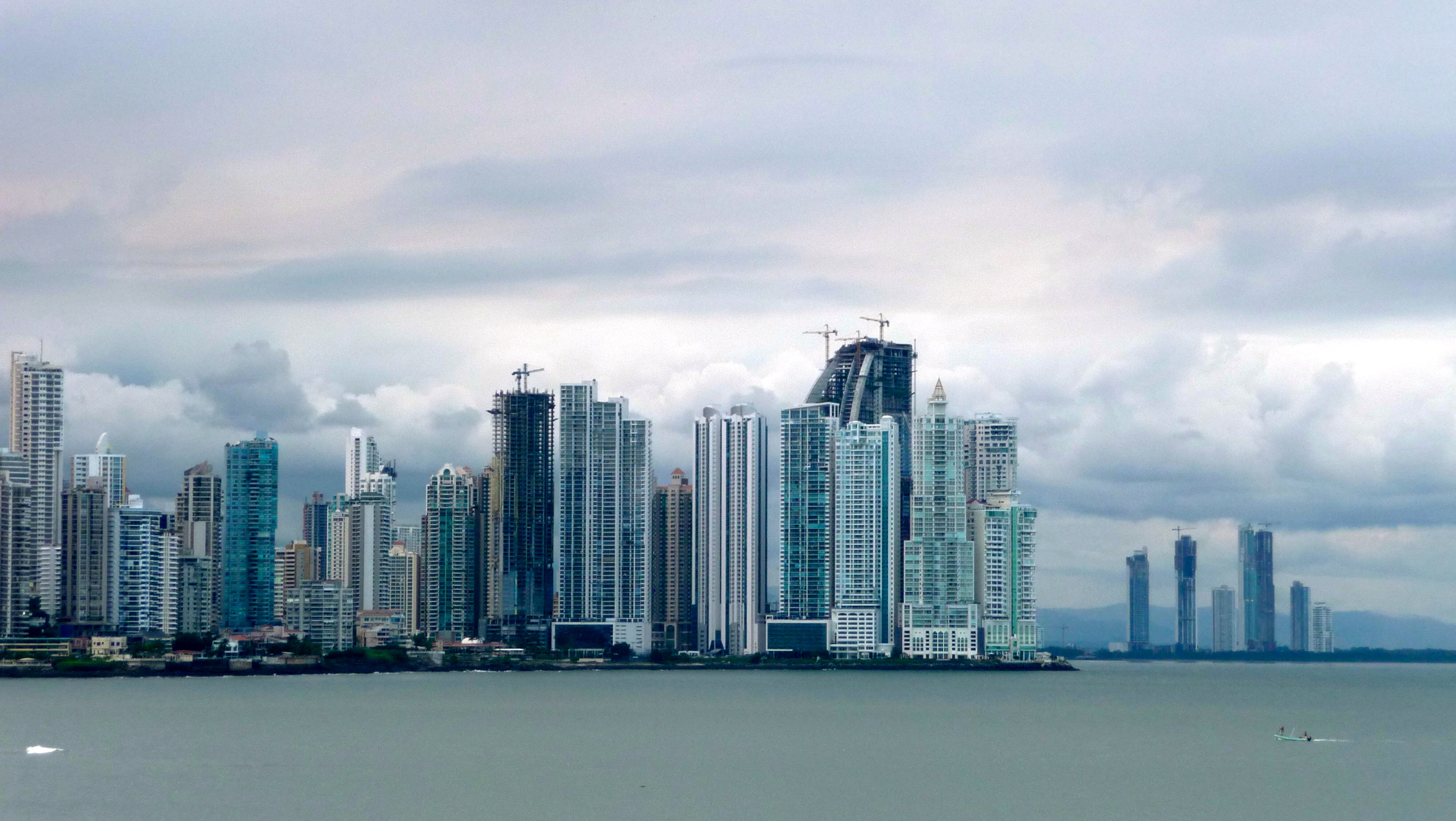
Skyline seen from Casco Viejo

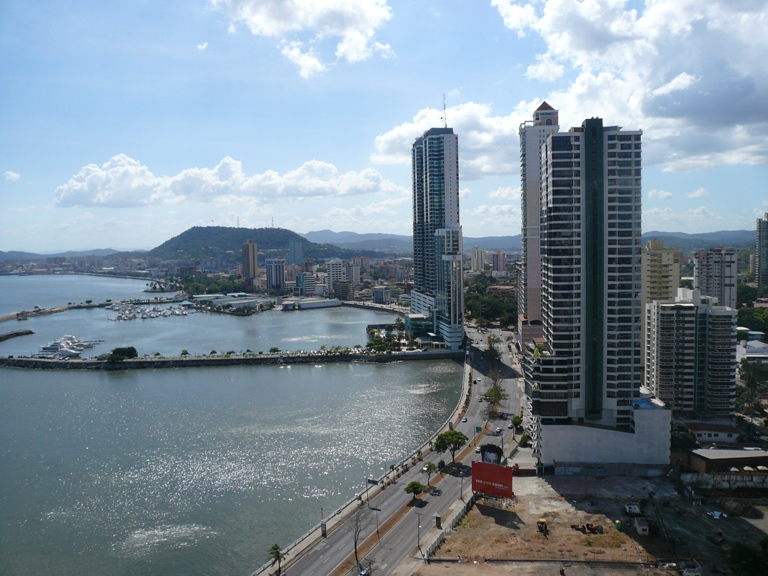
The former Balboa Avenue

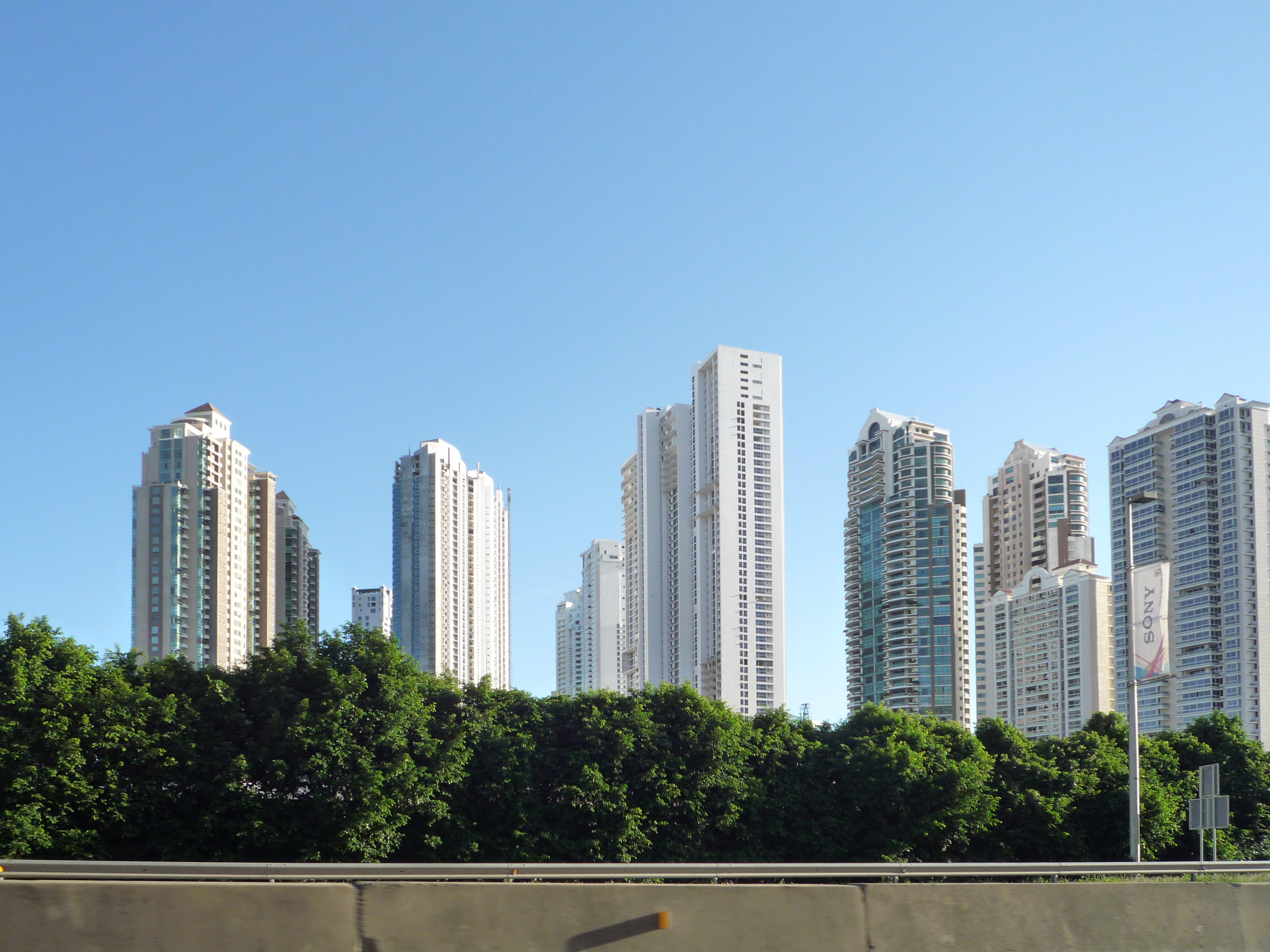
Panama skycrapers

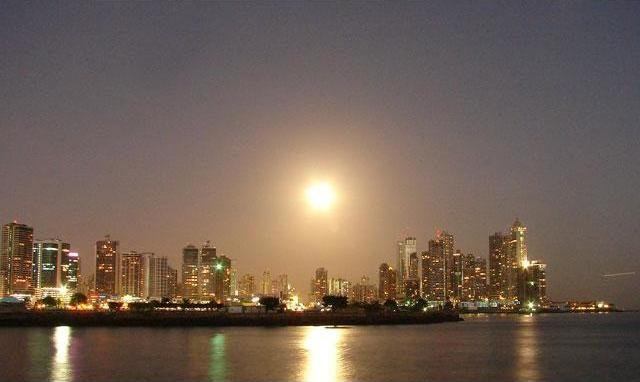
Panama Bay

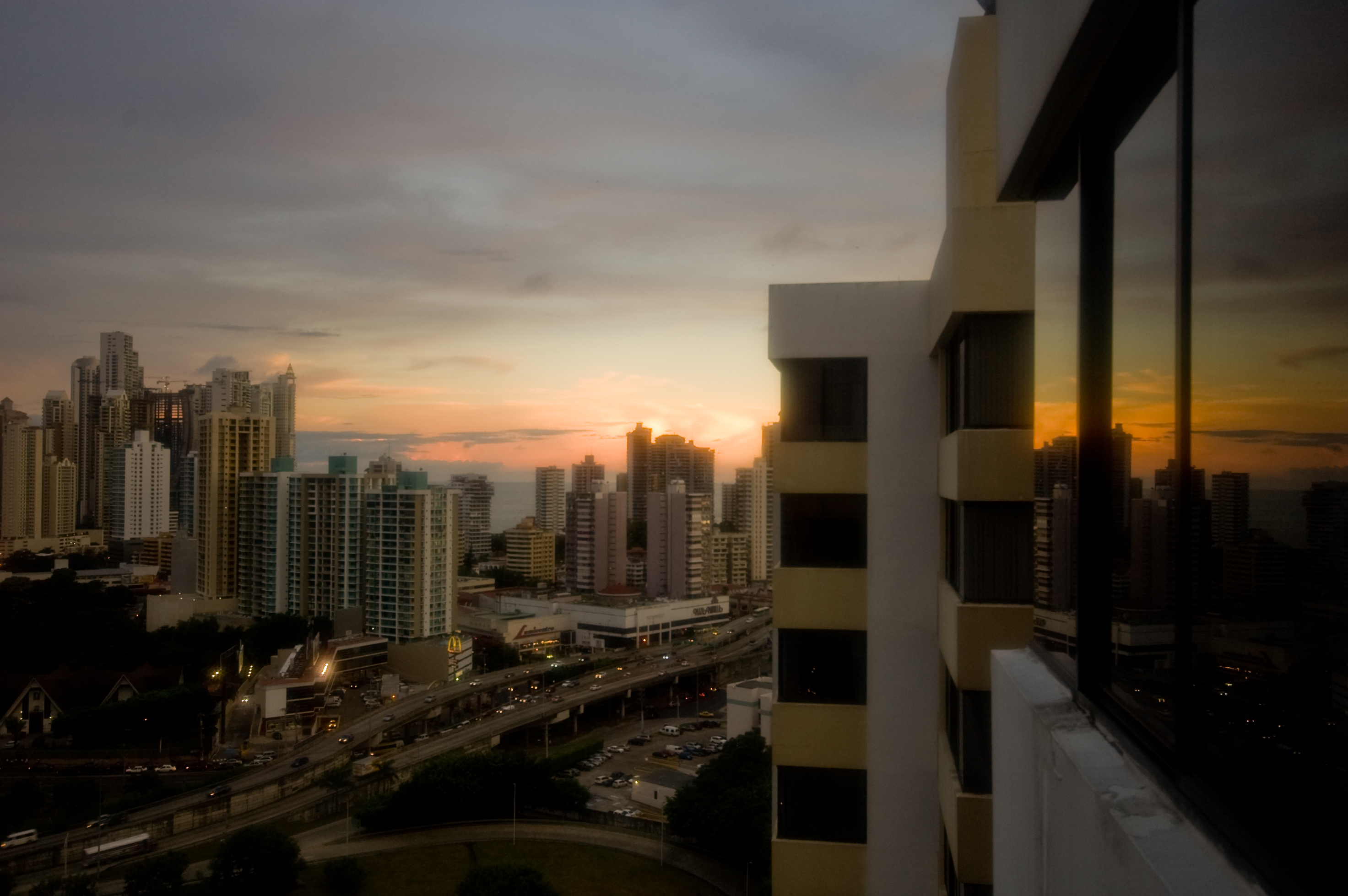
View of part of the metropolitan area of Panama

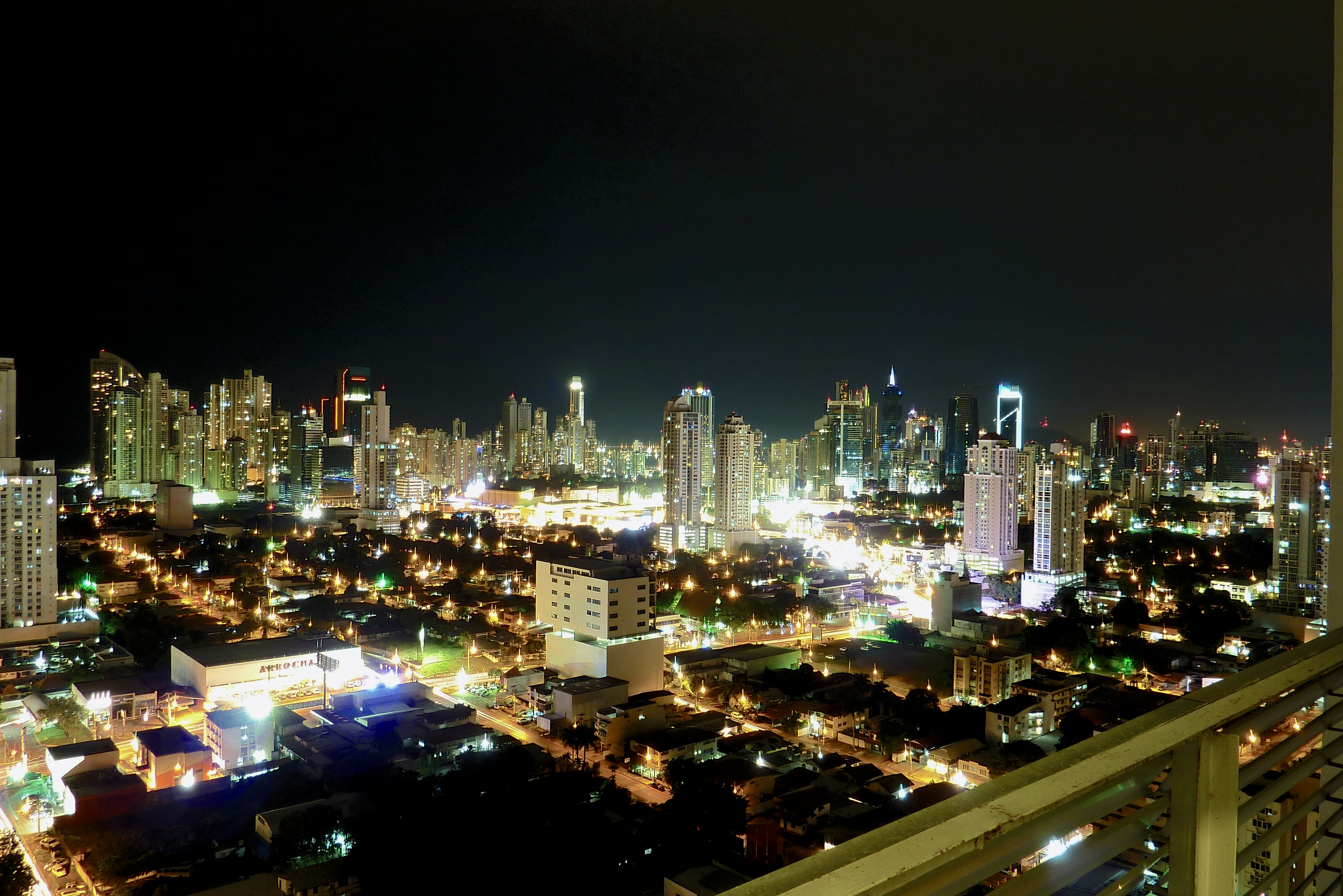
Panama City at night

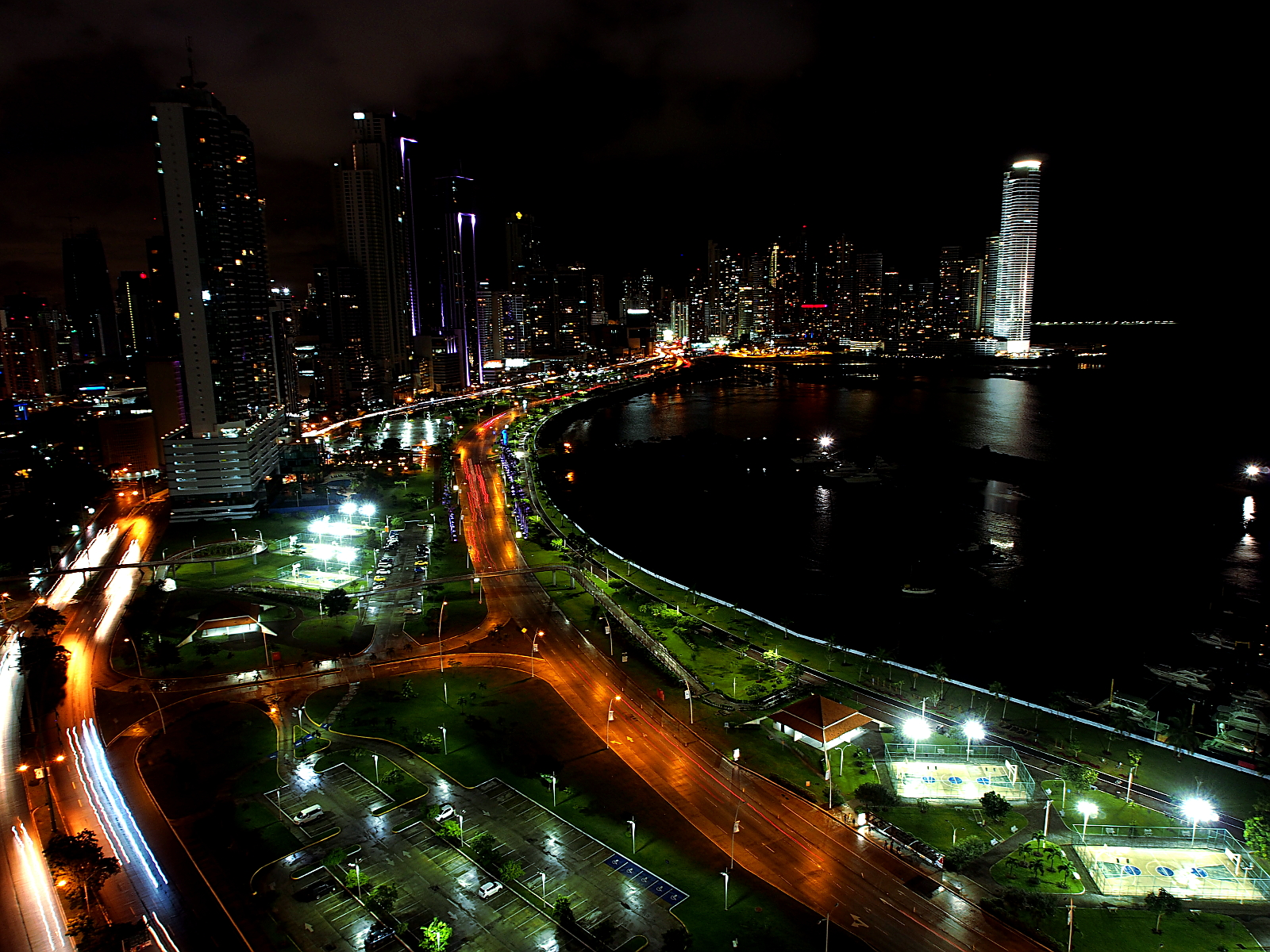
Panama City at night

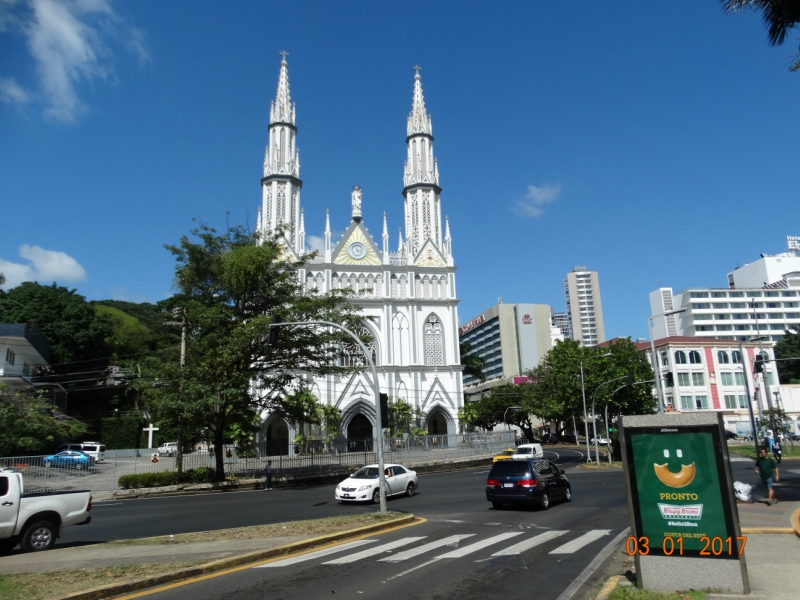
Iglesia Nuestra Sra. del Carmen

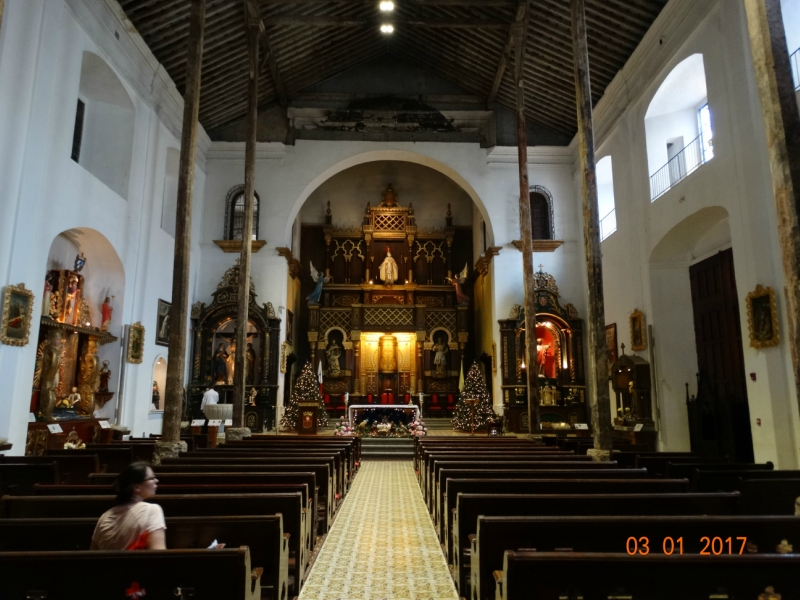
Interior view in Iglesia de la Merced

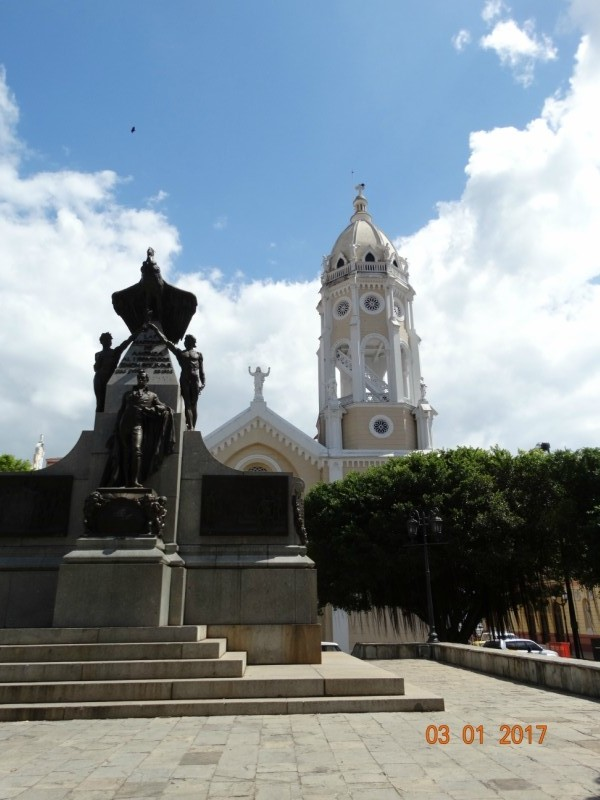
Plaza de Bolivar

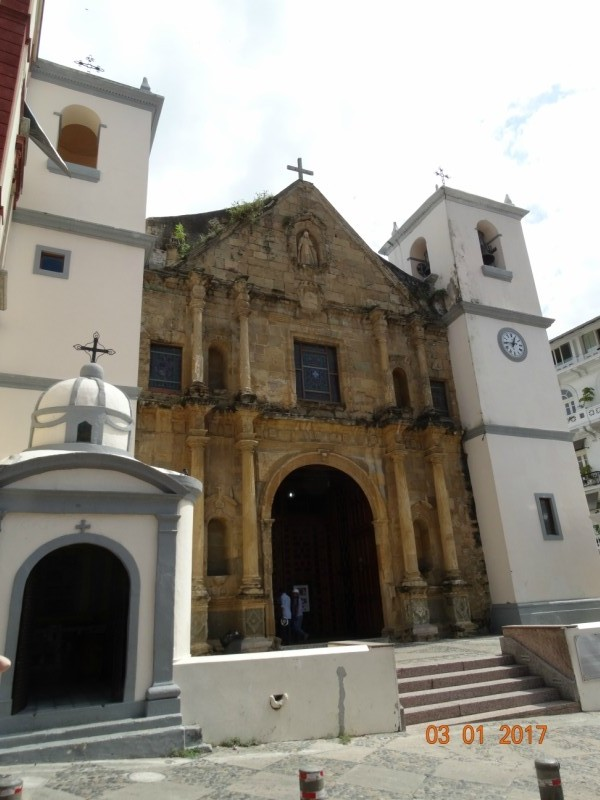
Iglesia de la Merced

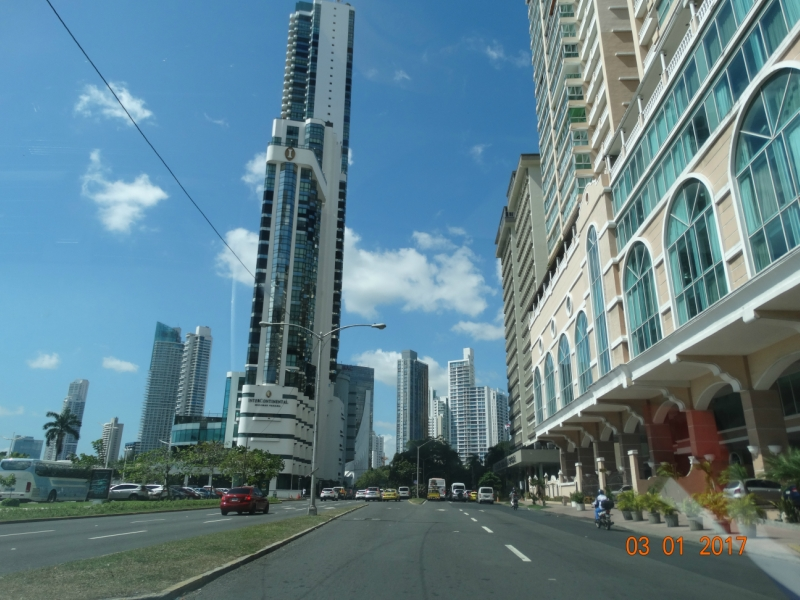
Street view

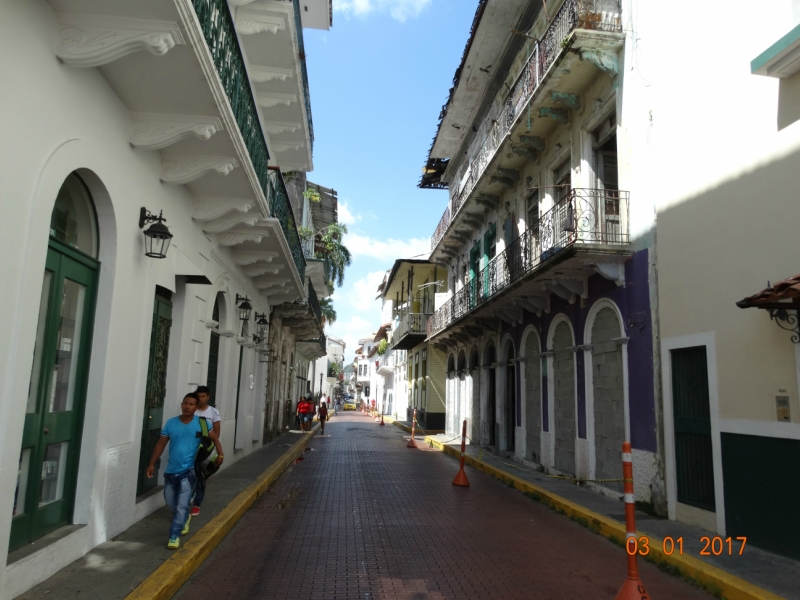
Street in old city

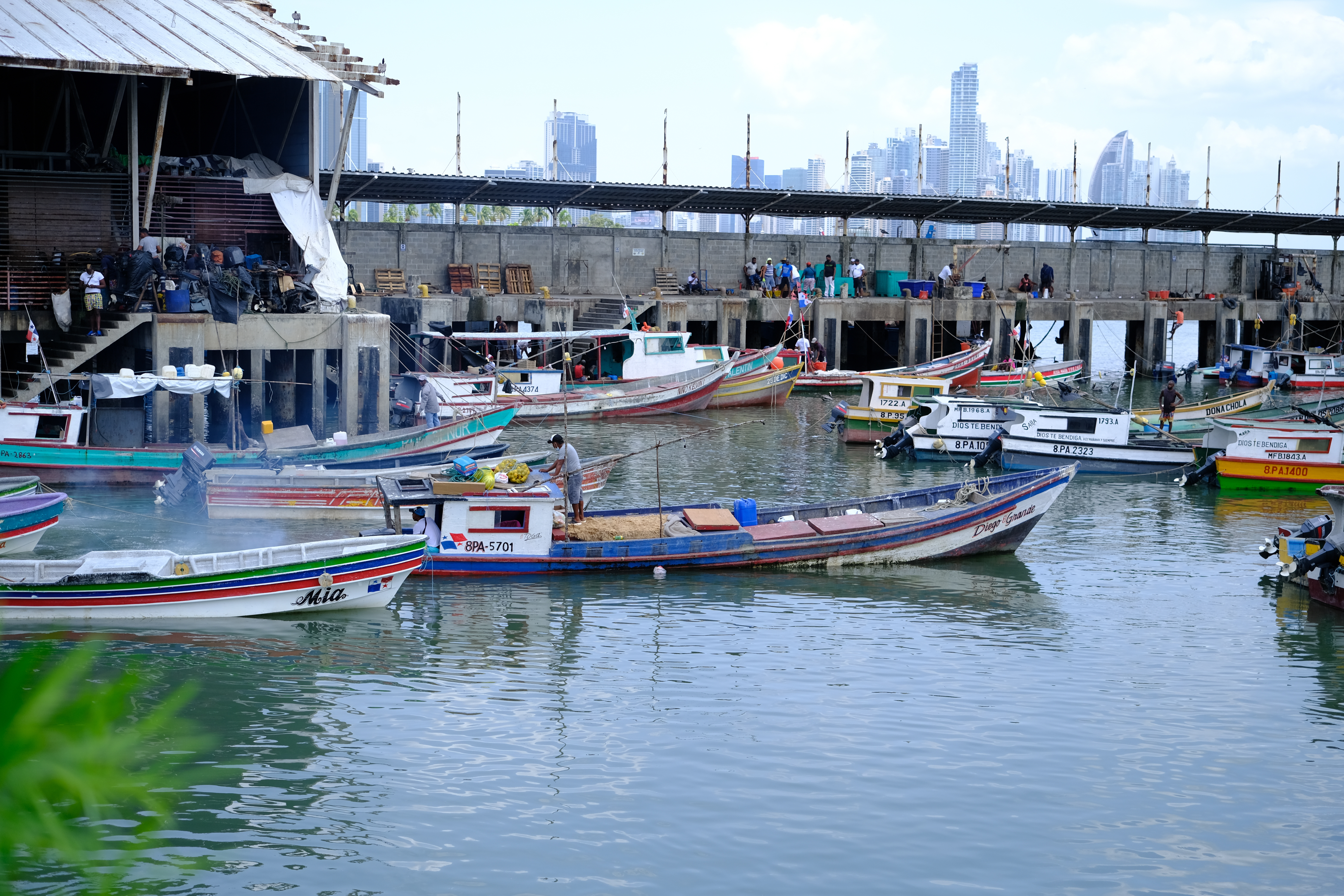
Fishing boats outside Mercado De Marisco Cinta Costera

== See also ==
- Panamá Viejo
- La Joyita Prison
- List of cities with the most skyscrapers
- Manhattanization
