= Rodney Zelenka =

Panamanian painter and visual artist (born 1953)

- Born: 1953 (age 72–73); Panama City, Panama
- Education: Cornell University
- Known for: Painting, mixed-media art
- Website: rodneyzelenkaart.com/en/

Rodney Zelenka (born 1953) is a Panamanian painter and visual artist whose figurative and mixed-media work explores migration, violence, social exclusion and the exercise of power. He represented Panama at the centennial Venice Biennale in 1995, as part of the Istituto Italo-Latino Americano exhibition, and at the 23rd São Paulo Art Biennial in 1996. He was one of fourteen artists in Crosscurrents: Contemporary Painting from Panama 1968–1998 at the Americas Society in New York, and has since exhibited in Panama, the United States, Mexico and elsewhere.

== Early life and education ==
Zelenka was born in Panama City in 1953. He has said that his parents came to Panama from Europe to escape the Holocaust. From 1962 to 1969 he took courses with the painters Alfredo Sinclair and Guillermo Trujillo at Panama's Escuela de Bellas Artes. He studied at Cornell University in Ithaca, New York, from 1971 to 1977, majoring in economics with a minor in Latin American politics and taking courses in studio art. According to his published curriculum vitae, he spent extended periods between 1979 and 1989 working alongside the artists Julio Zachrisson in Madrid, Rodolfo Abularach in New York and Jessy Patrick Allen in California.

== Career ==
=== Early exhibitions and international biennials ===
In 1979 Zelenka received a prize at the Gulf Oil Exhibition at Panama's Museo de Arte Contemporáneo, and in 1980 he held his first solo exhibition at Galería Arte 80 in Panama City. Writing in La Estrella de Panamá, the artist and writer Arístides Ureña Ramos placed Zelenka alongside Brooke Alfaro and Tabo Toral among the Panamanian artists who had spent time in New York in the 1970s and joined the local exhibition scene in the early 1980s.

In the late 1980s and early 1990s he exhibited at New York galleries such as Gallery Revel (1987) and Cast Iron Gallery (1993), and in Japan at Shone Okuda Gallery in Tokyo (1989) and at venues in Osaka and Nagoya (1990). In 1994 he took part in the Bienal de Cuenca in Ecuador and the Caribbean Biennial in Santo Domingo.

In 1995 Zelenka represented Panama at the 46th Venice Biennale, the centennial edition of the exhibition. He was one of nine artists from nine countries in the exhibition organized by the Istituto Italo-Latino Americano (IILA) at the Chiesa di San Giovanni Novo in Venice, for which Fernando Macotela served as commissioner, assisted by Alessandra Bonanni.

The following year he represented Panama at the 23rd São Paulo Art Biennial, held from 5 October to 8 December 1996 under the general curator Nelson Aguilar. The official catalogue devoted several pages to Zelenka and reproduced paintings including Asesino del Tiempo (1996), El Color de la Supervivencia (1996) and Escape en Cámara Lenta de Hueco Negro (1995). In an accompanying essay, the art critic Phyllis Braff described how the work combined tightly ordered patterns, figurative scenes and psychological tension.

Also in 1996, Zelenka held exhibitions at the Museo de la Nación in Lima, the Casa de la Cultura Ecuatoriana in Quito and the Museo Municipal de Arte Moderno in Cuenca. He later recalled that the Lima exhibition, Canto a la guerra y el fuego, used suspended mattresses to evoke the possessions carried by people fleeing disasters. His exhibition Tensión was shown at Panama's Museo de Arte Contemporáneo in 1997 and at the Museo de Arte Moderno in Santo Domingo in 1998.

In 1998 Zelenka took part in Crosscurrents: Contemporary Painting from Panama 1968–1998, curated by Mónica E. Kupfer and Edward J. Sullivan, which ran at the Americas Society in New York from 2 May to 31 July. The survey brought together fourteen Panamanian painters whose work had developed amid the political and cultural changes the country had undergone since 1968. His exhibition record also lists Panamanian art biennials up to 2002 and an international biennial in Buenos Aires that year.

=== Exhibitions since 2020 ===
In 2020 Zelenka took part in Everything Is Art, Everything Is Politics, an online group exhibition organized by Elga Wimmer PCC and curated by Wimmer and Berta Sichel. Writing about his paintings, Mark Bloch reported that the curators had compared Zelenka's treatment of the human body to the work of Leon Golub. According to the artist's exhibition history, the show was later presented at the Museo Casa Pintada of the Fundación Cristóbal Gabarrón in Mula, Spain, in 2021–2022.

Dominion and Frailty, curated by Wimmer and Thalia Vrachopoulos, was shown at the Tenri Cultural Institute in New York in November and December 2022. The paintings dealt with displacement, poverty and unequal relations of power. In their reviews, Mary Hrbacek and Bloch discussed how the show set grey human figures against brightly colored everyday belongings, and the journalist Lucy Komisar interviewed Zelenka about his use of suitcases and his concern with abusive power.

In Mexico, a run of exhibitions began in 2022 with Mística social at the Centro Estatal de las Artes in Tecate, Baja California, which later traveled to Ensenada and Tijuana. In 2023 the Museo de Arte de Ciudad Juárez showed A ras de suelo, about 50 works dealing with migration, homelessness, violence and abuses of authority.

Also in 2023, Zelenka showed Rivers of Babylon at Lichtundfire in New York, co-curated by Wimmer and Priska Juschka. Reviewing the show, the art critic Robert C. Morgan related its works on paper to imagery of mass migration and discarded possessions.

In 2024 he took part in No Trespassing: Artists Comment on the Migration Crisis, curated by Vrachopoulos at the Anya and Andrew Shiva Gallery of John Jay College of Criminal Justice. He contributed ten paintings on war and the abuse of power, which he said were prompted by Andy Warhol's electric-chair imagery. From 31 May to 18 August that year, the Museo de Arte Contemporáneo de Querétaro presented Realidades incomprensibles, curated by Francisco "Pancho" López: more than forty works in painting, drawing, sculpture and installation, arranged around migration and the exercise of power.

Suitcase Stories, curated by Gladys Turner Bosso, was shown at the Galería Juan Manuel Cedeño in Panama City in 2024 and explored the belongings and experiences of people displaced by war and hunger. At Lichtundfire, Semiotics of a Spider (2024), curated by Wimmer and Juschka, developed the artist's recurring spider motif across paintings, sculpture, video and drawings.

In March 2025 Zelenka opened two exhibitions in Mexico City, both curated by López: Estéticas de la coerción, with work made between 2022 and 2024, at the Casa de la Primera Imprenta de América of the Universidad Autónoma Metropolitana; and Personalidades desubicadas, with works dating from 1997 to 2021, in the cultural display cases of the Zócalo/Tenochtitlan station of the Mexico City Metro. Later that year, Suitcase Stories was presented again at the Centro Cultural Teatro García Carrillo during the Fiesta Internacional de las Artes in Saltillo.

Night Travelers, Zelenka's third solo exhibition at Lichtundfire, ran from 4 to 28 March 2026 and was curated by Juschka.

== Artistic practice and critical reception ==
Zelenka works in painting, drawing, sculpture, installation and video. His pictures often set carefully rendered figures or ordinary objects against comparatively abstract fields. In her essay for the 1996 São Paulo Biennial, Braff described images of prisoners, isolated individuals and fish within strict, sometimes mosaic-like patterned spaces, and linked their spatial arrangement to psychological pressure and fantastical narrative. Reviewing Dominion and Frailty in 2022, Hrbacek characterized his approach as "merging realism with abstract non-descriptive pictorial space". Mexican coverage of his exhibitions has associated his imagery with Latin American surrealism.

Displacement has become a recurring subject: his canvases and works on paper include suitcases, furniture, clothes and other belongings that can stand in for the people forced to abandon them. Bloch noted his use of striped clothing reminiscent of concentration-camp uniforms and his recurring animals, among them cranes, turkeys, fish and spiders. The works on paper in Rivers of Babylon combined acrylic and ink with metal pins and 22-karat gold leaf. In Semiotics of a Spider, he used the spider and its web to explore barriers, entrapment and border crossings.

Bloch has also connected Zelenka's subject matter to Panama's years of military rule, relating the artist's political imagery in 2020 to his experience of the regime established in 1968 and the later rule of Manuel Noriega. In a 2022 interview with Komisar, Zelenka described his aim as denunciation rather than changing viewers' minds: "I just feel very uncomfortable with abusive power."

== Selected works ==
- Orange Carps in a Water Lily Pond (1994), acrylic on canvas
- Escape en Cámara Lenta de Hueco Negro (1995), acrylic on canvas
- Asesino del Tiempo (1996), acrylic on canvas
- Manhole (2020), acrylic on canvas
- Waiting Has a Price (2021), acrylic on canvas
- Web Masters (2021), acrylic on canvas
- Golden Wall (2022), gold leaf, acrylic, ink and metal pins on paper
- Migration Road (2023), acrylic, gold leaf, ink and metal pins on paper
- Three Sunsets (2026), acrylic and aluminum foil on canvas

== Awards ==
- 1979 – Prize, Gulf Oil Exhibition, Museo de Arte Contemporáneo, Panama
- 1986 – Honorable mention, national art competition, Instituto Nacional de Cultura, Panama
- 1997 – Honorable mention, 2nd Egyptian International Print Triennale, Giza
