= Casco Viejo, Panama =

Historic District of Panama City in Panama

Casco Antiguo
- Historic District of Panama City
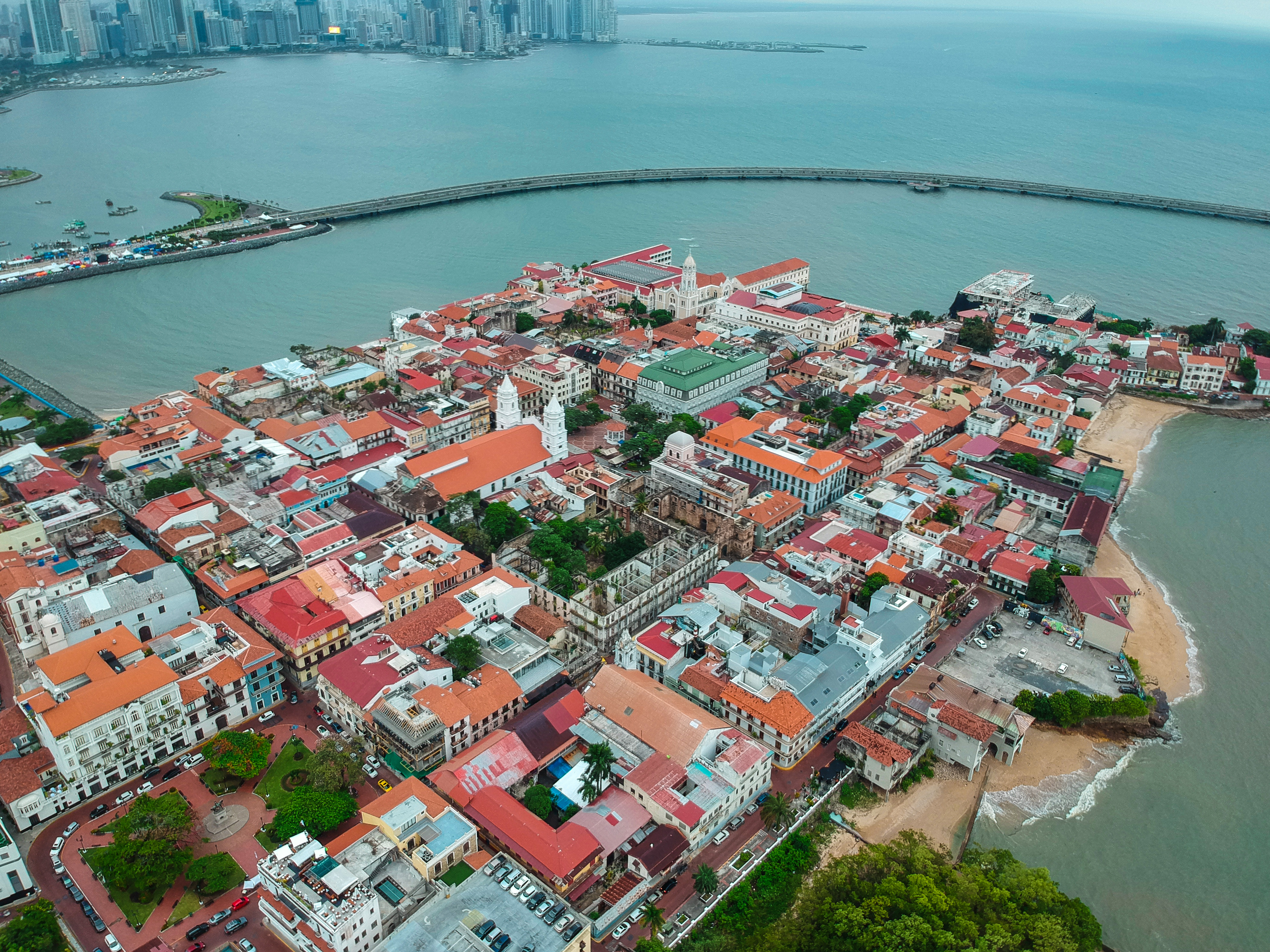
- Aerial Panorama (Casco Antiguo)

- Location of San Felipe(Casco Antiguo) in Panamá province

- Location within Panama
- Coordinates: 8°57′09″N 79°32′06″W
- Country: Panama
- Province: Panamá
- District: Panamá
- City: Panama City
- Website: cascoviejo.org

Casco Antiguo (Spanish for Old Quarter), also known as Casco Viejo or San Felipe, is the historic district of Panama City. Completed and settled in 1673, it was built following the near-total destruction of the original Panamá city, Panamá Viejo in 1671, when the latter was attacked by pirates.

== History ==
Panama City was founded on August 15, 1519 and it lasted one hundred and fifty-two years. In January 1671, the Governor Juan Perez de Guzman had it set on fire, before the attack and looting by the pirate Henry Morgan. In 1672, Antonio Fernández de Córdoba initiated the construction of a new city, which was then founded on January 21, 1673. This city was built on a peninsula completely isolated by the sea and a defensive system of walls. Today this place preserves the first institutions and buildings of the modern city of Panama. It is known as Casco Viejo (Spanish for Old Town).

In the 18th century this part of the city was the victim of three large fires that partially destroyed it and modified its initial structure. The current configuration dates from the end of the 19th century and the first half of the 20th century. The reconstruction allows the insertion of neoclassical, Afro-Antillean buildings within the ruins and colonial buildings, which differentiates it from other old towns in cities such as Cartagena de Indias, Colombia, and Quito, Ecuador, which have an almost exclusively colonial style.

In recent years, Casco Viejo has become a tourist hotspot filled with restaurants, boutique hotels, museums and nightclubs and has experienced gentrification, while also maintaining the multiple historical sites it has to offer.

== Main sights ==
- La Catedral Metropolitana is the main Catholic church in Panama city.
- El Palacio de las Garzas is the governmental office and residence of the President of Panama.
- Church and Convent of San Francisco de Asís.
- Church of San José
- Church of La Merced
- Church and Convent of Santo Domingo: Arco Chato
- Church and convent of the Society of Jesus.
- Palacio Municipal, which dates from the beginning of the 20th century.
- Palacio Nacional
- National Theatre of Panama
- Panama Canal Museum
- Palacio Bolívar
- Góngora House
- Plaza Bolívar
- Plaza Herrera
- Plaza de Francia
- Plaza de la Independencia

== Gallery ==
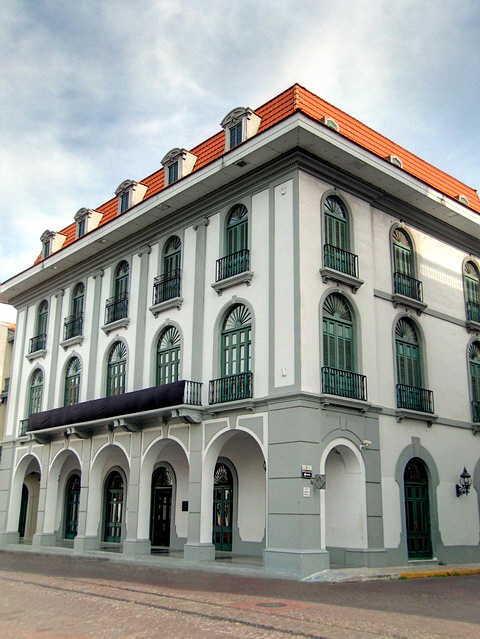
Panama Canal Museum

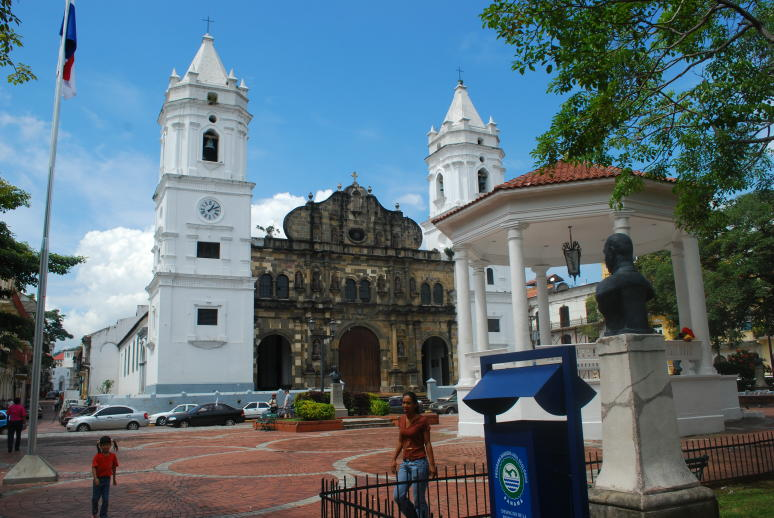
Plaza de la Independencia

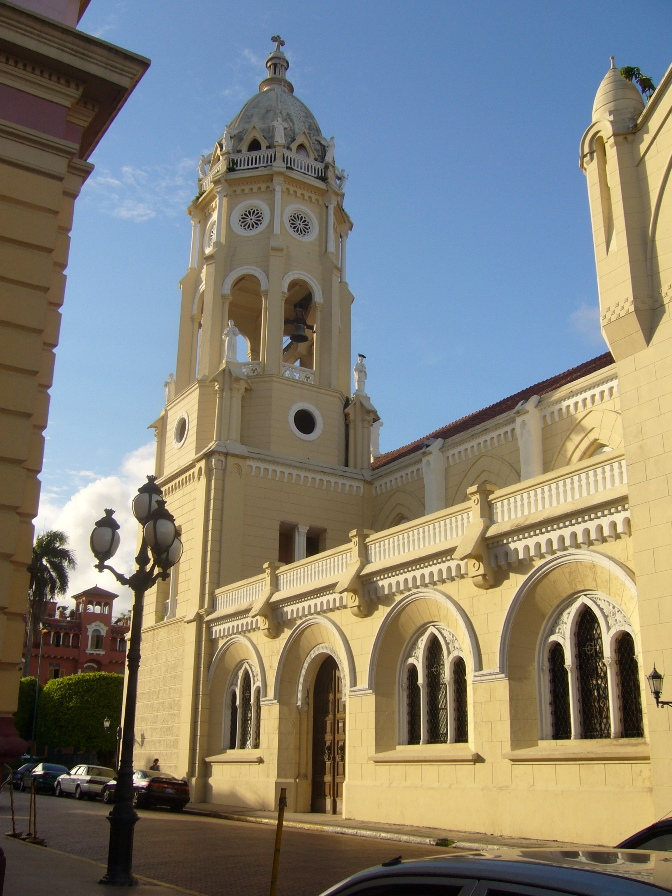
San Francisco de Asís Church

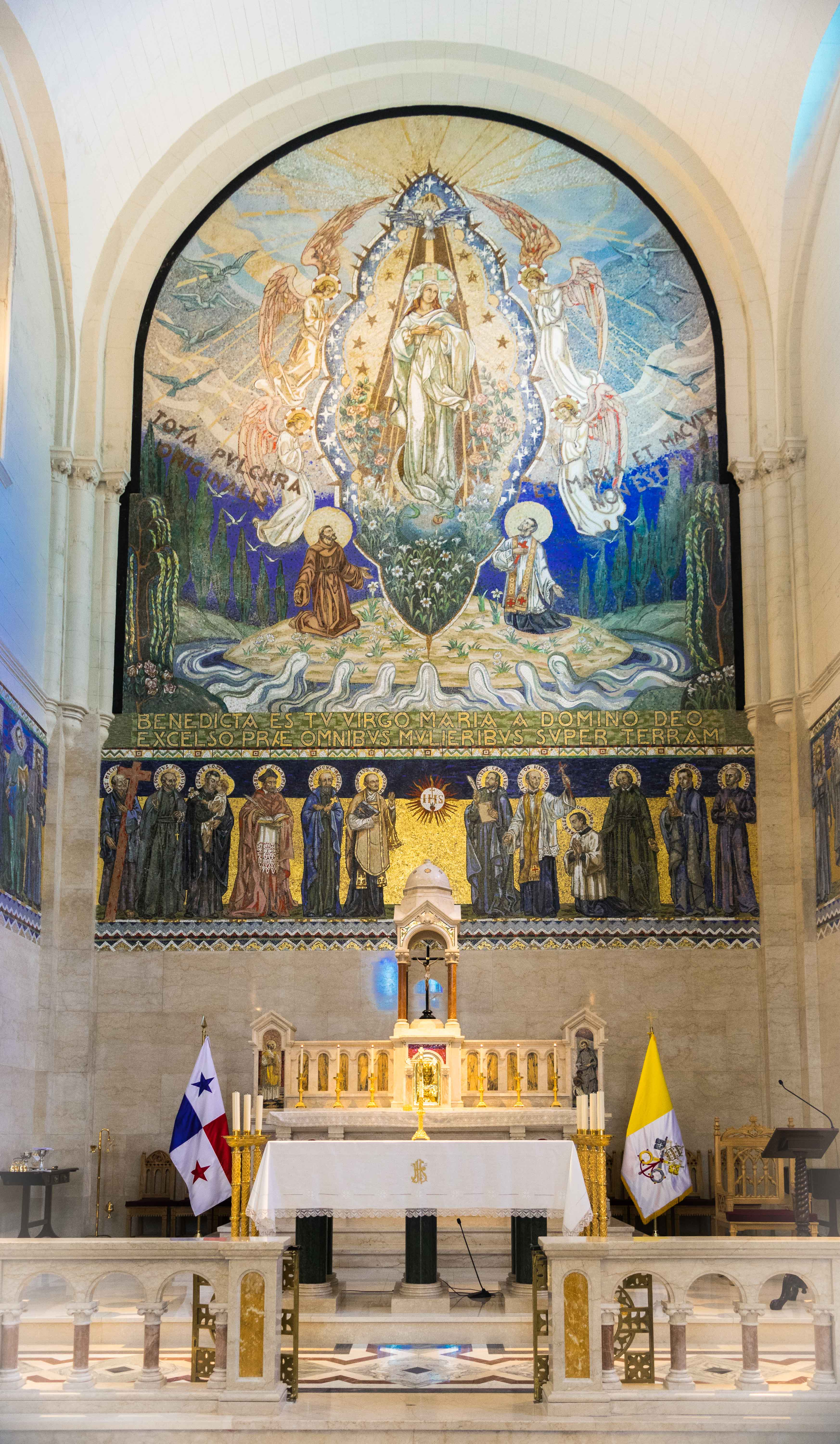
Inside San Francisco de Asís Church

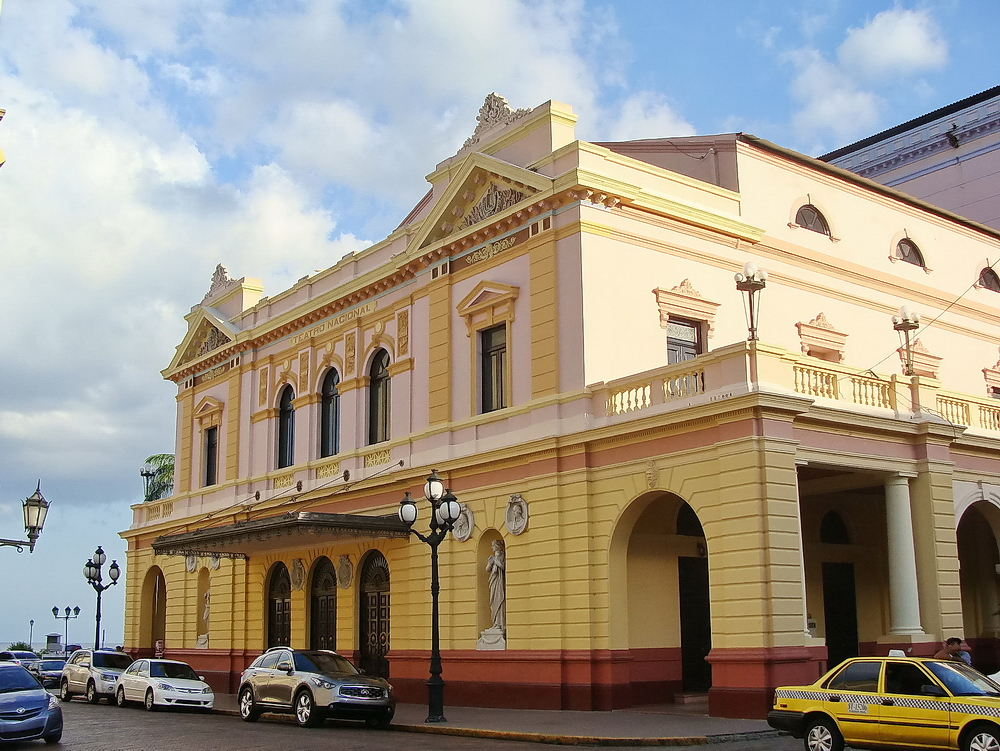
National Theater

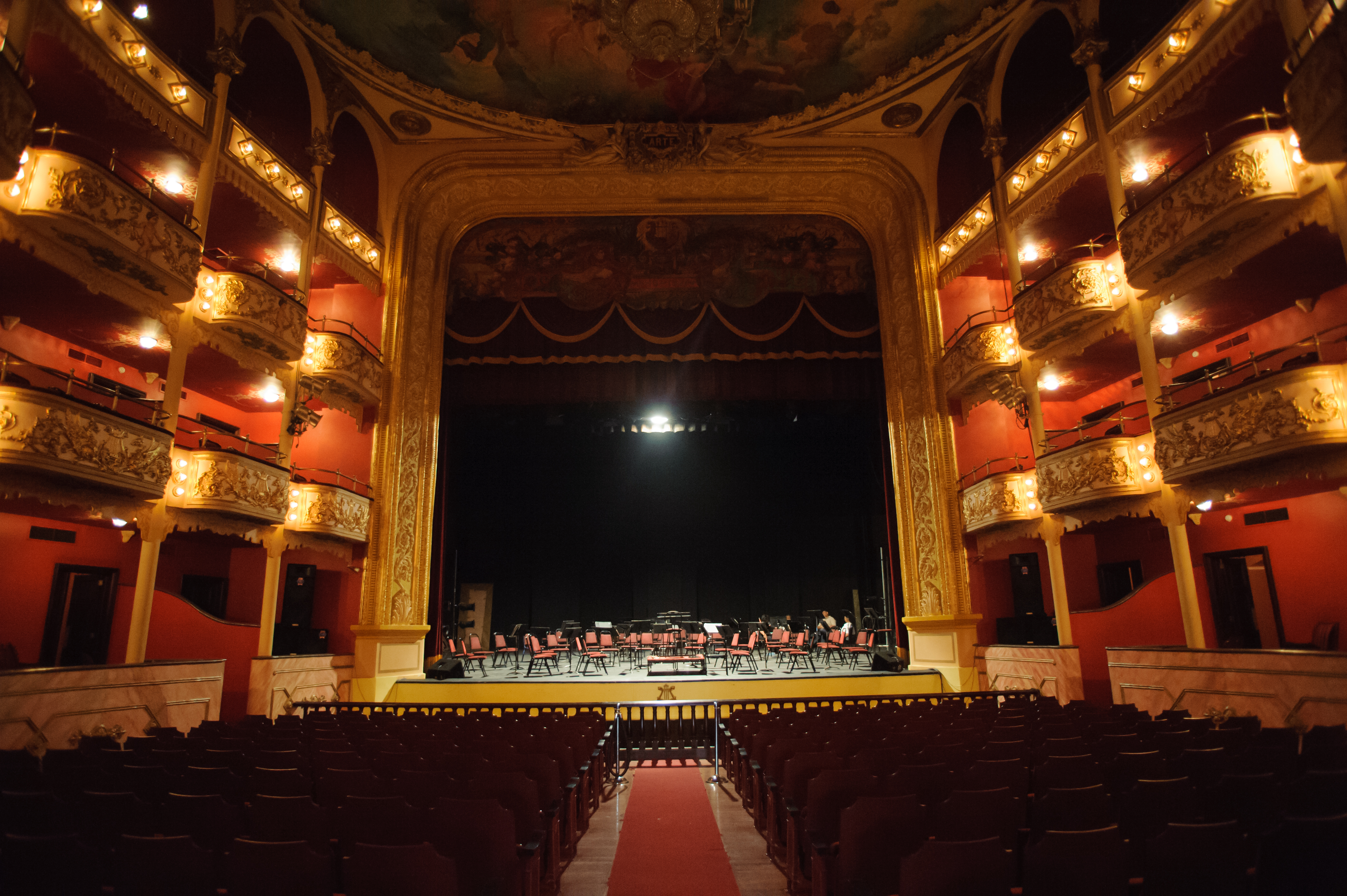
Inside the National Theater

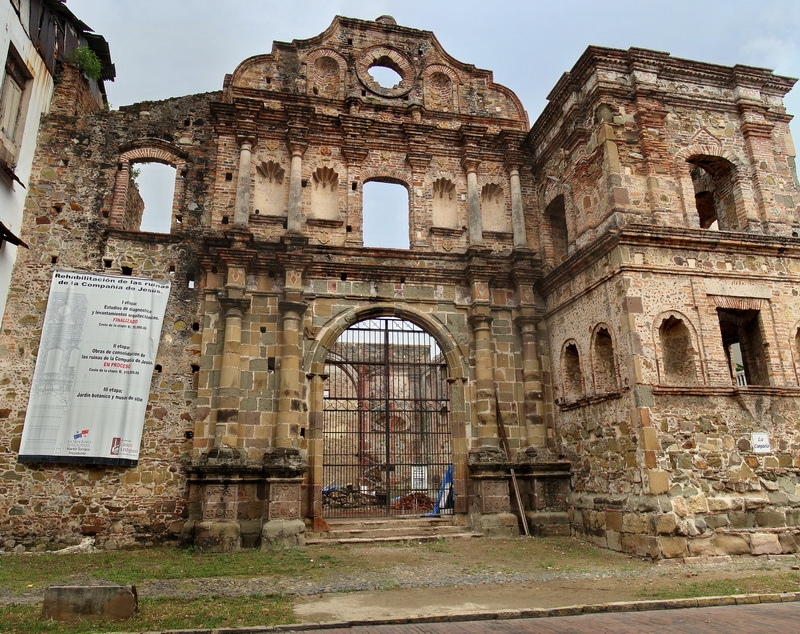
Society of Jesus

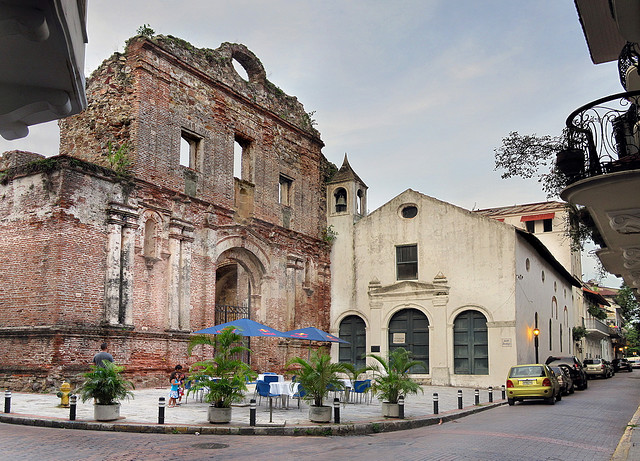
Convento de Santo Domingo

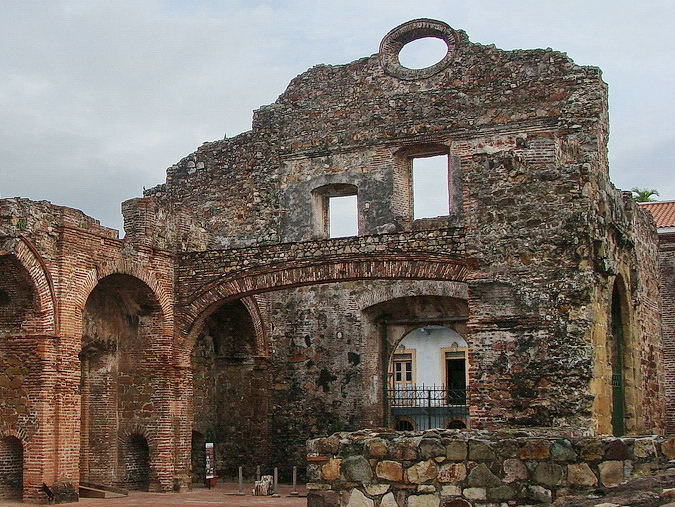
Arco Chato

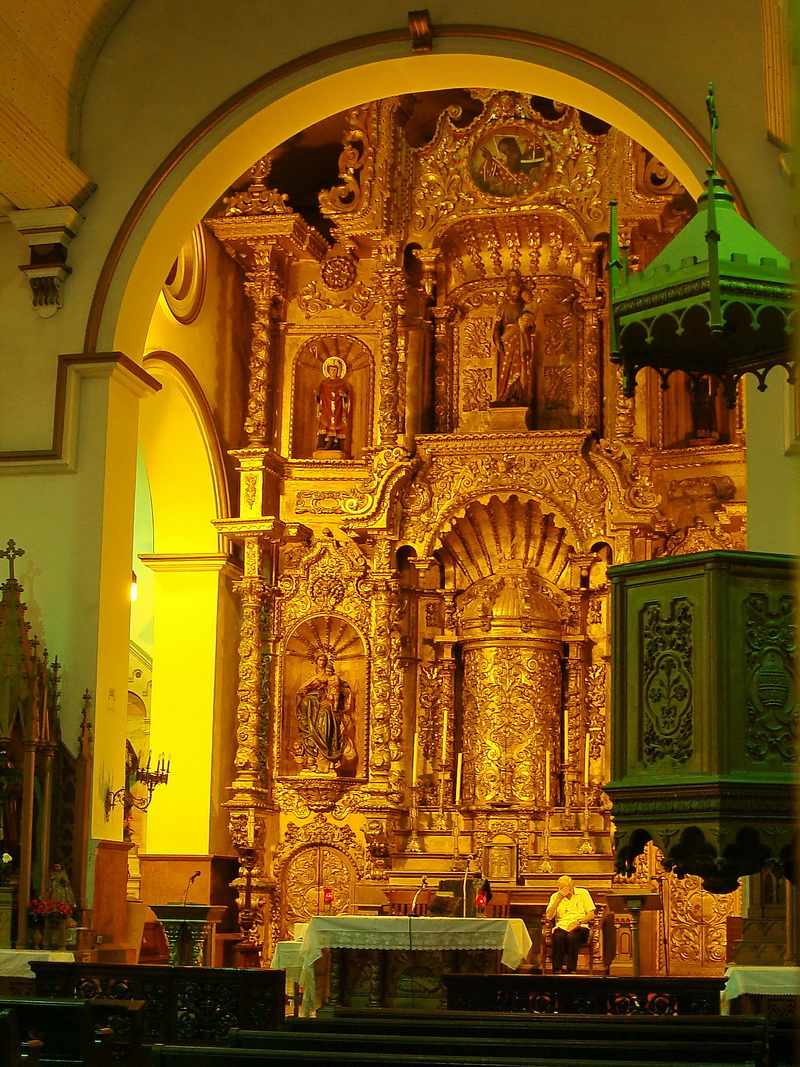
San José Church

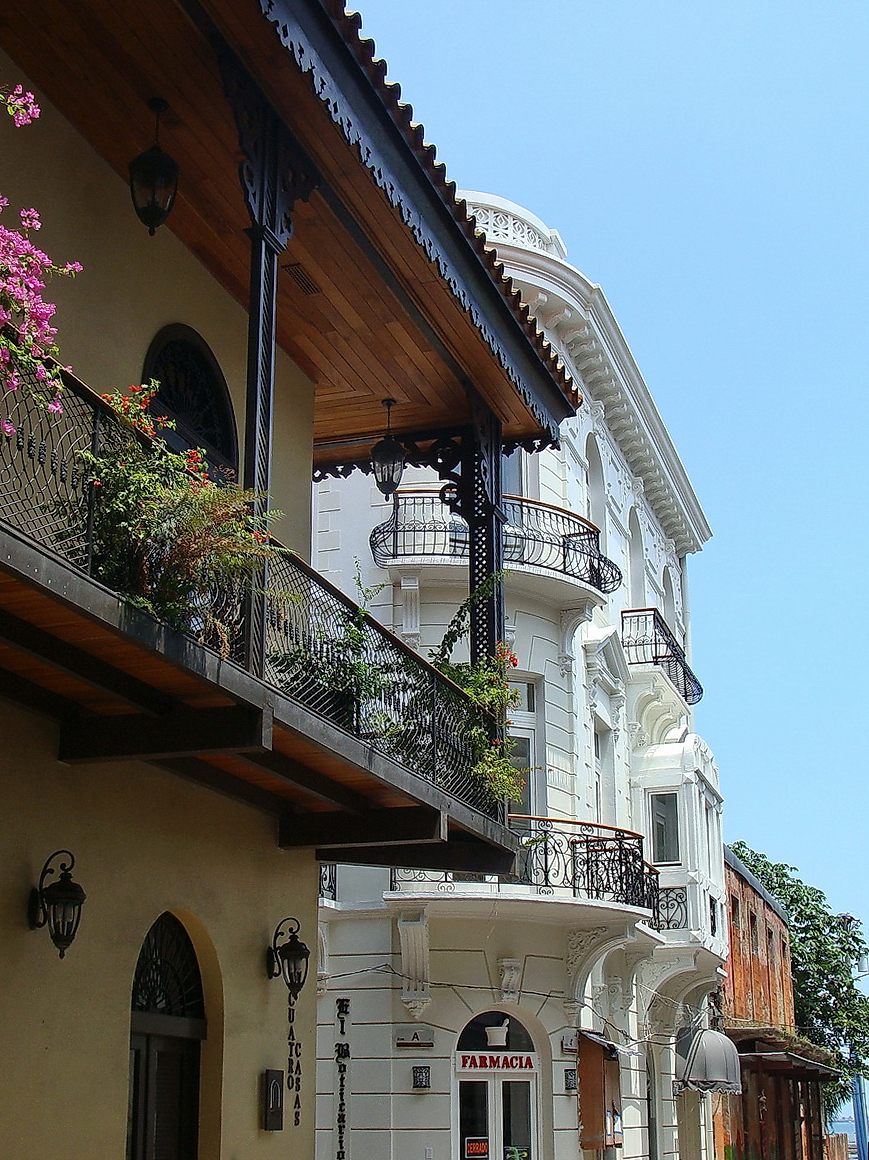
Typical houses

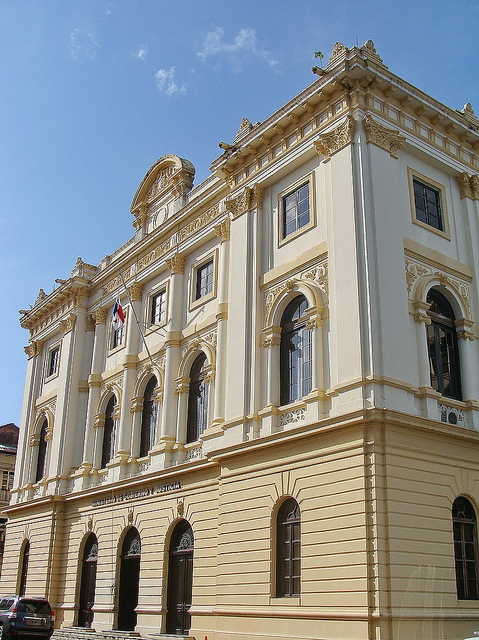
Palacio Nacional

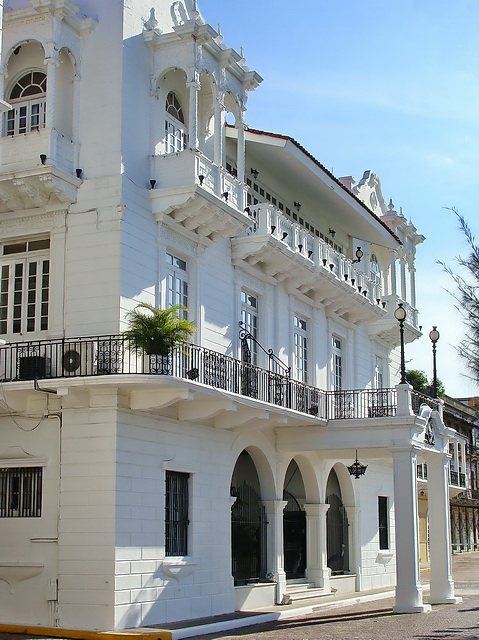
Palacio de las Garzas

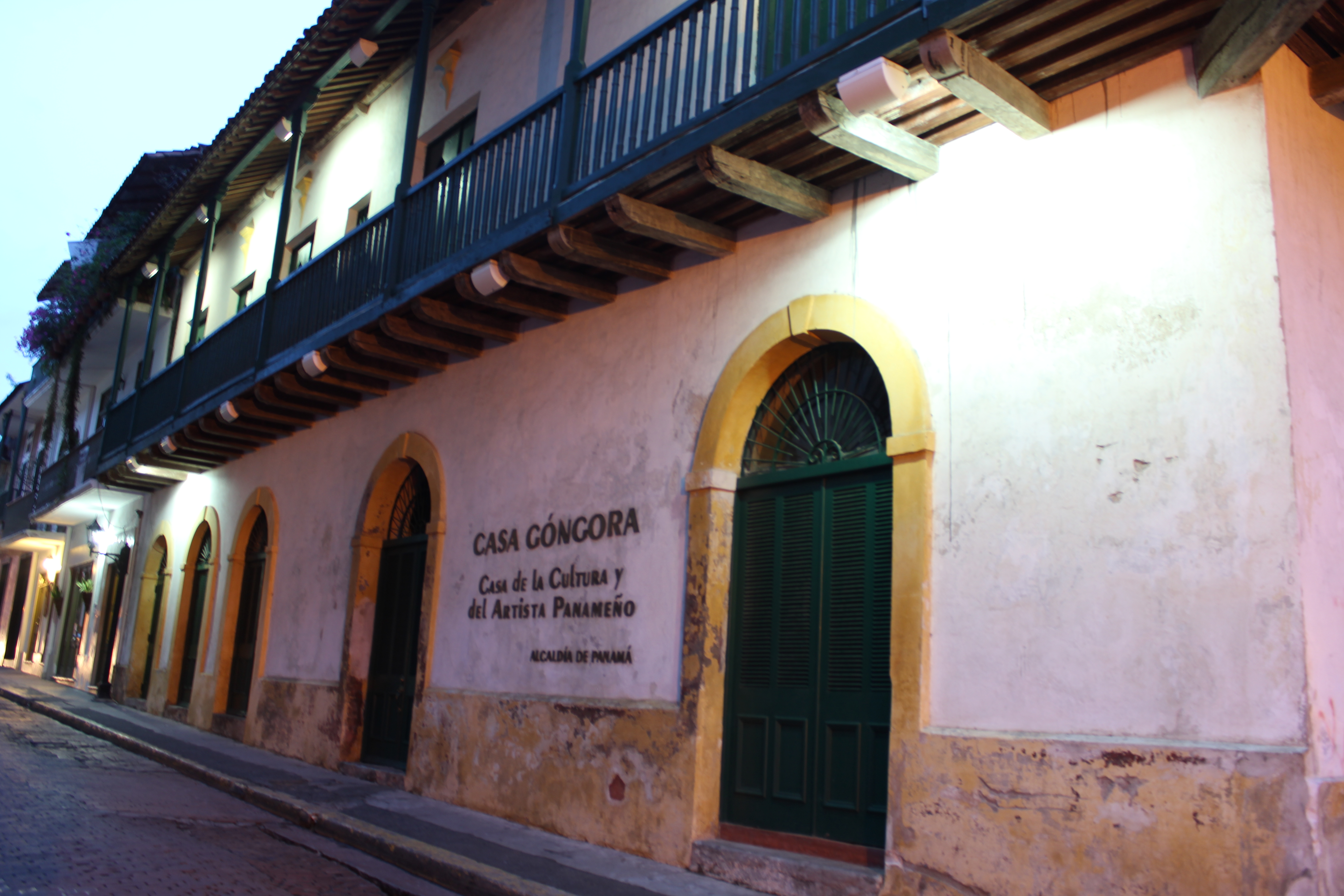
Casa Góngora

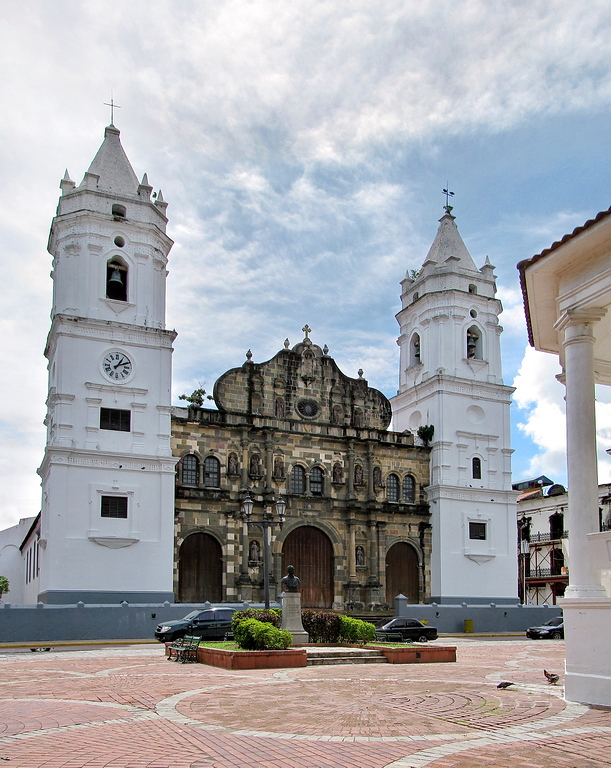
Catedral Metropolitana

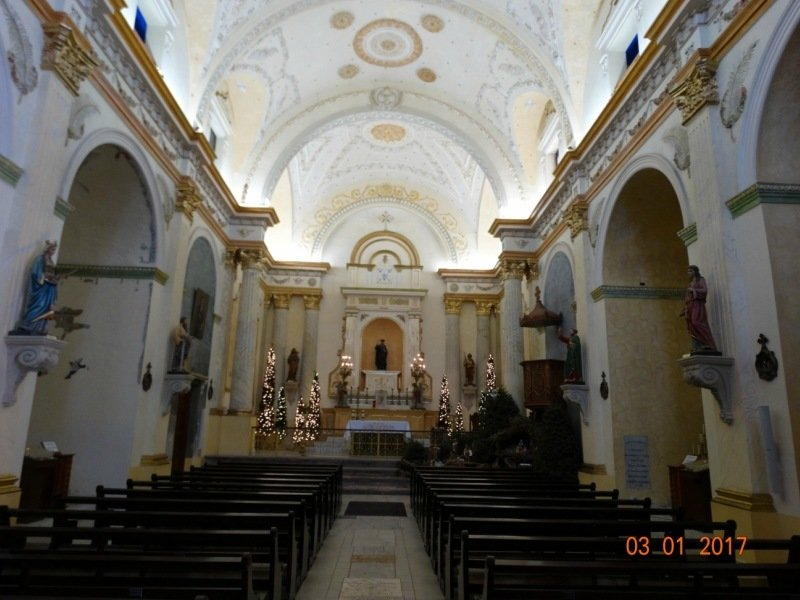
Inside the Catedral Metropolitana

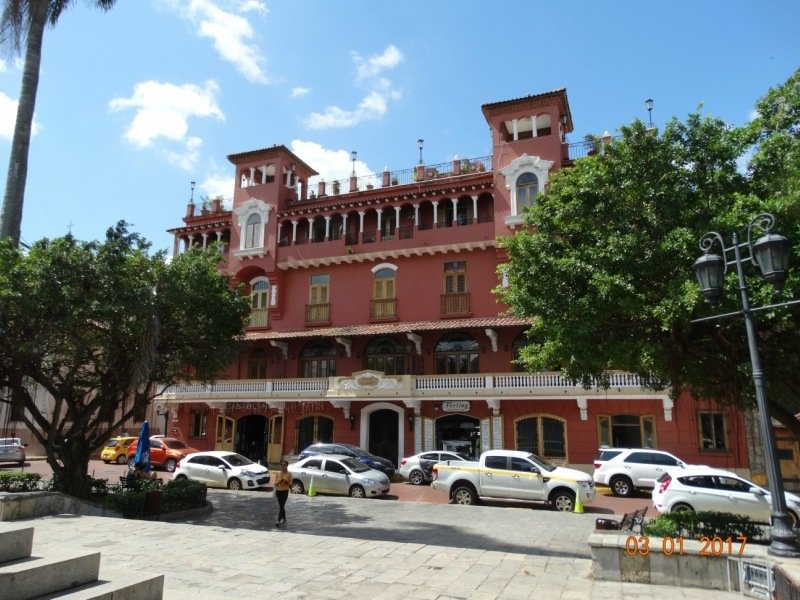
Plaza Bolivar

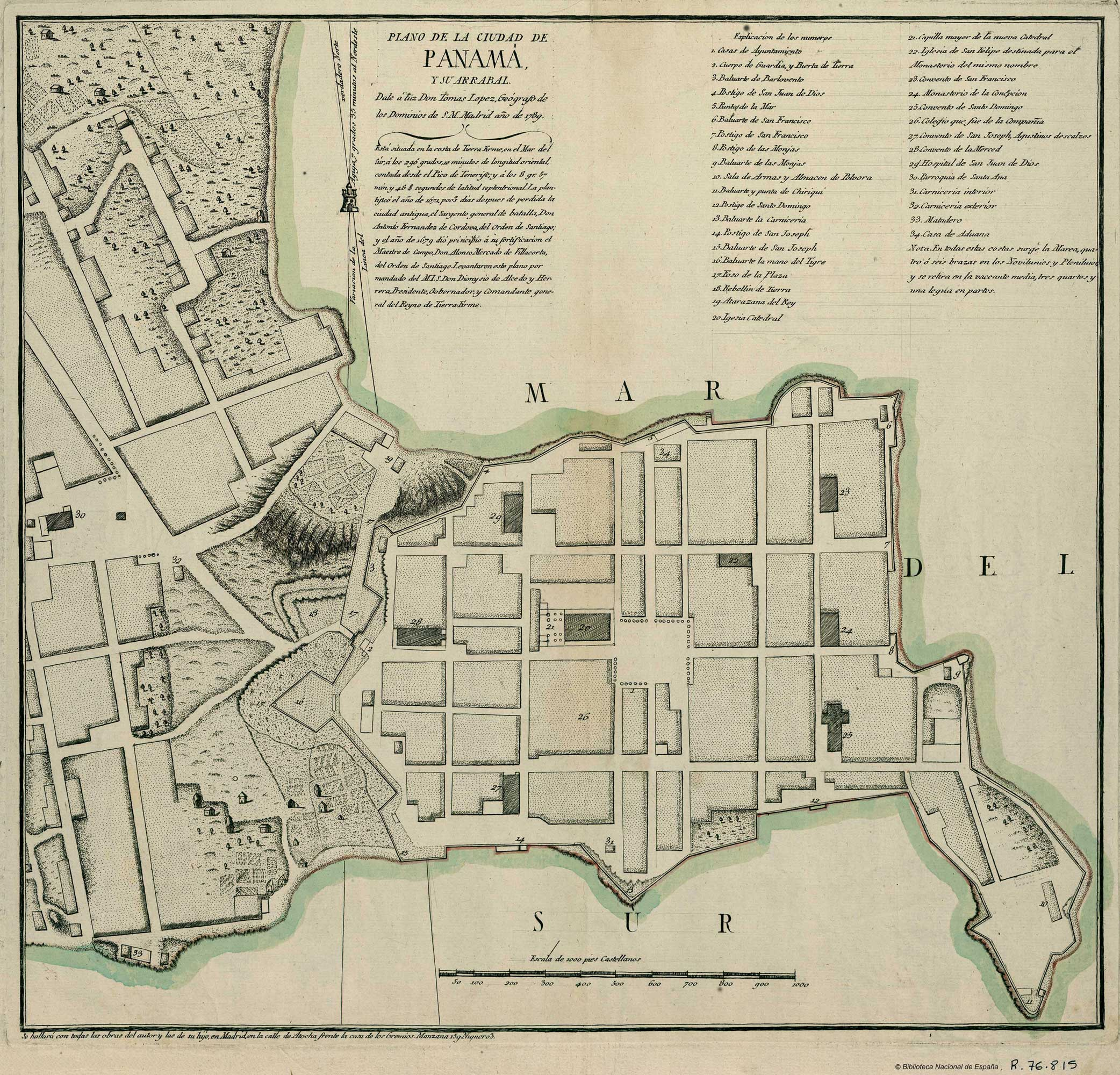
Map of Panama and its suburb in 1789

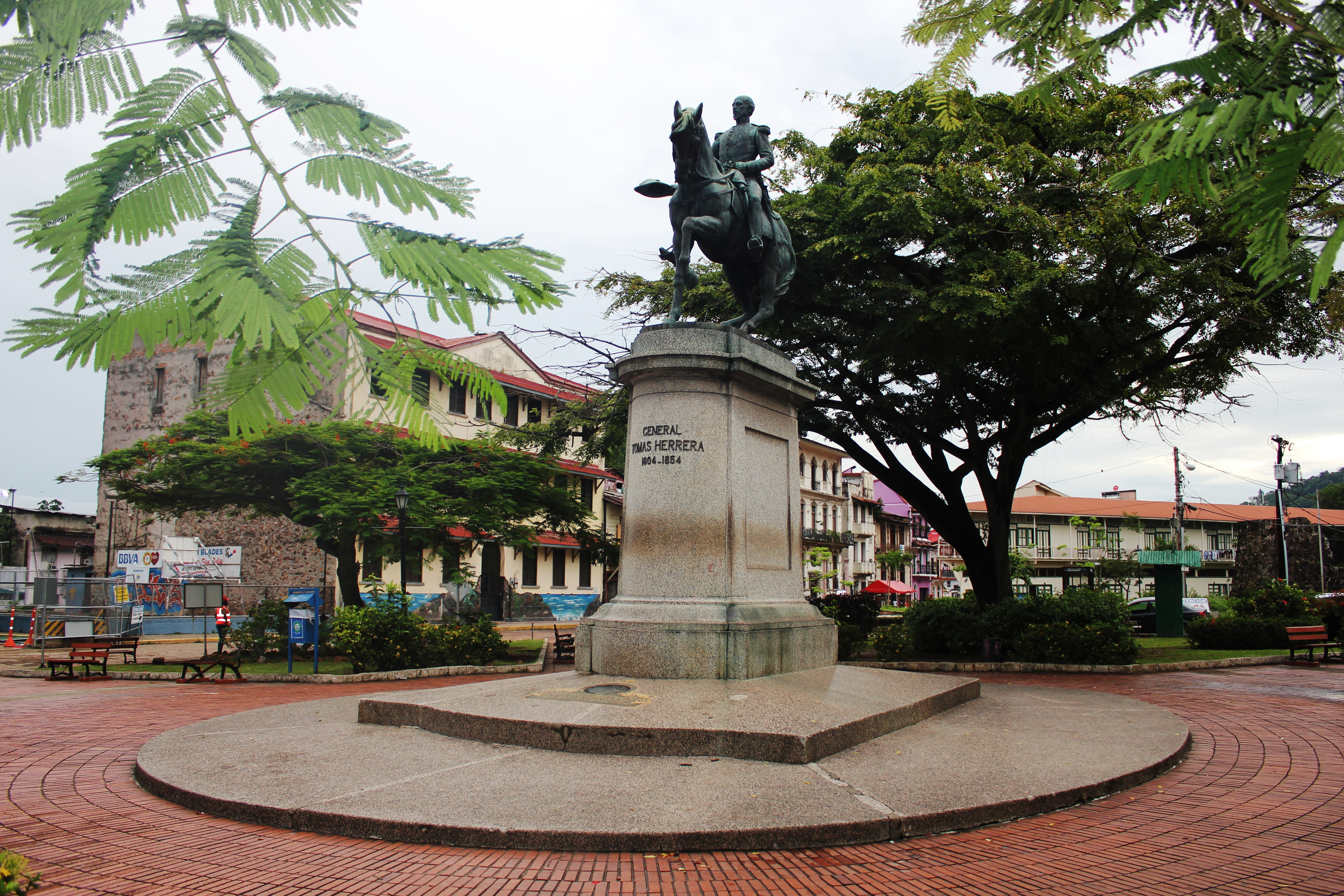
Plaza Herrera

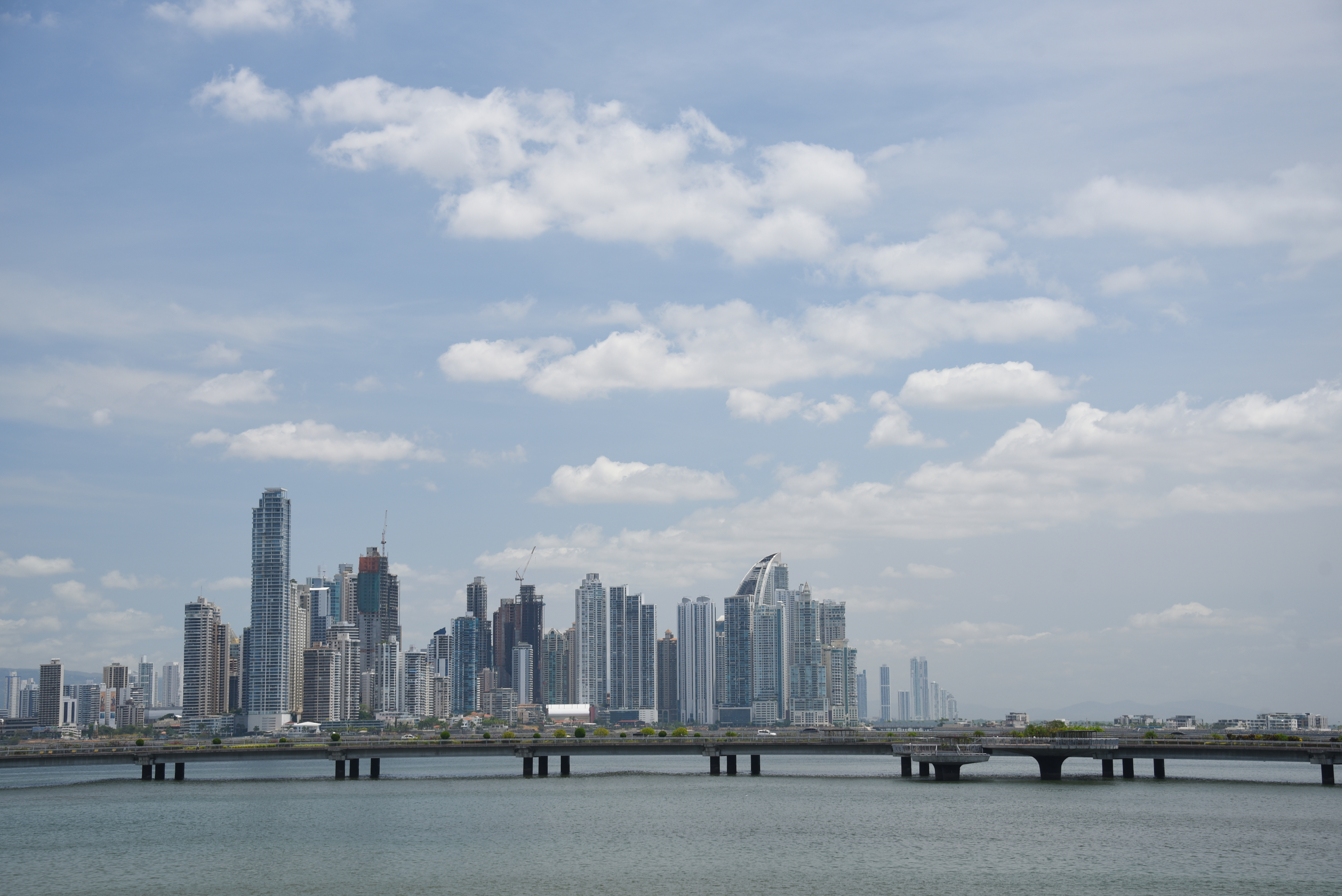
Panama City view from Casco Viejo
