= Trixie Briceño =

Panamanian painter (1911–1985)

Beatrix (sometimes Beatriz) Briceño (September 16, 1911 - November 4, 1985) was a British-born Panamanian painter. She was among the first women artists to exhibit her work in Panama.

A native of London, Briceño grew up in various places including the United States, China, and Japan. She married the Panamanian journalist and diplomat Julio Briceño, and moved with him to his native country, where she began raising a family. She took Panamanian citizenship in 1943. Briceño began her artistic studies at the University of Panama in 1956; she studied with Juan Manuel Cedeño, and took lessons from Betty Bentz in the Canal Zone. During a sojourn in Rio de Janeiro with her husband between 1958 and 1960, she studied with Frank Schaeffer, an erstwhile pupil of Fernand Léger. It was in that city that her first one-woman show took place, in 1959 at the Central American Gallery; numerous solo exhibitions in Panama followed over the years, including three at the Instituto Panameño de Arte in 1964, 1970, and 1978. She also showed her work internationally. The Briceños moved to Arizona in the 1970s, although Trixie continued sending paintings for exhibition in Panama. In 1982, the Museo de Arte Contemporáneo in Panama exhibited a retrospective of her work. She died in Sun City, Arizona.

Briceño's style is marked by a combination of surrealistic tendencies and politically-engaged subject matter, depicted using bright and vivid colors. She is represented in the collection of the Art Museum of the Americas.
