= Roberto Lewis =

Panamanian artist (1874–1949)

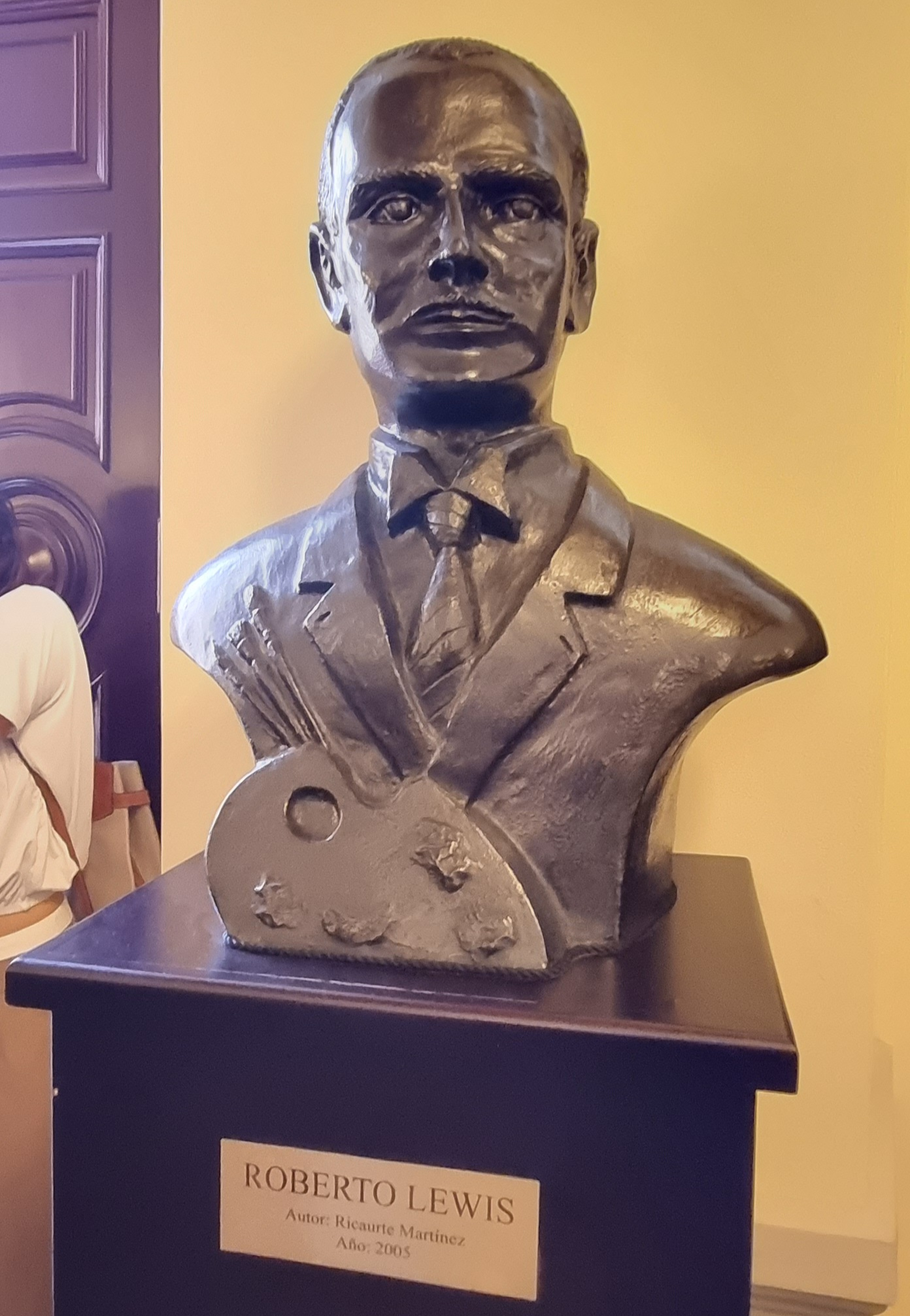
- Bust of Roberto Lewis at the National Theatre of Panama.
- Born: Roberto Gerónimo Lewis García de Paredes; 30 September 1874; Panama City
- Died: 22 September 1949 (aged 74); Panama City, Panama
- Occupations: Painter; sculptor

Signature
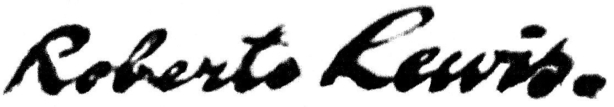

Roberto Gerónimo Lewis García de Paredes (Panama City, 30 September 1874 – Panama City, 22 September 1949), commonly known as Roberto Lewis, was a Panamanian painter and sculptor.

== Biography ==
Roberto Gerónimo Lewis y García de Paredes was born on 30 September 1874 in Panama.

He completed his primary studies at the Catholic school of the Sisters of Saint Vincent de Paul and began secondary studies at the College of the Christian Brothers. His family sent him to Paris where he finished his secondary education.

He returned to Panama and worked in his family's businesses. After a short stay he went back to Paris, where he studied with the academic painter Léon Bonnat (1833–1923) and later with the post-Impressionist Albert Dubois-Pillet (1846–1930).

Upon his return to Panama he was commissioned to create a series of works intended to exalt the grandeur of some public buildings.

The neoclassical architecture introduced by Genaro Ruggieri was the “official architecture” of the time and is reflected in works such as the National Theatre, the Palacio de las Garzas (Presidential Palace), the Palace of Justice, the Municipal Palace and the National Institute.

Lewis's classicism paralleled the period's "official painting" and gave rise to a singular expression of painting in Panama. From that period (1907) date the main curtain, the ceiling painting and the foyer of the National Theatre of Panama.

These works demonstrate a rare mastery of drawing and foreshortening, especially in the circular linking of seraphic bodies that rise to celebrate the birth of the Republic.

Lewis showed an excellent aptitude for landscape and portrait painting, fields in which he freed himself from the demanding canons of classicism.

When the Government of Panama decided to separate from Colombia in 1903, Roberto Lewis was appointed Panama's consul in Paris. In 1905 he exhibited works at the Annual Salon of French Artists. His portrait L'homme qui rit ("The Laughing Man") opened the doors of fame for him in the exacting and refined Parisian milieu.

He earned recognition for defending Panamanian interests in relation to the transfer of assets from the French Canal Company to the United States, although his patriotic efforts were ultimately overruled.

Returning to Panama in 1912, he devoted himself fully to painting and teaching. He was appointed director of the National School of Painting. In 1915 he served as artistic director of the National Exhibition of Panama alongside Narciso Garay and Carlos Endara. He taught painting until 1937, when he retired from the National Institute's School of Arts and Crafts and from several private professional colleges.

He worked at the National School of Fine Arts, of which he was director until 1935. His most important pupils included Humberto Ivaldi, Isaac Benítez and Juan Manuel Cedeño.

In 1936 he painted a mural series in the main hall of the Juan Demóstenes Arosemena Normal School, where he attempted to depict the history of humanity; however, that work remained unfinished.

At the beginning of the 20th century the canal-influenced architecture stood out, following the American garden-city design combined with broad avenues inspired by the Paseo del Prado in Madrid, Spain. Notable features included continuous arcades for pedestrians, a regular street grid, large roofs and rhythmic windows.

The Peruvian architect Leonardo Villanueva Meyer followed Ruggieri's pattern and became the government's official architect. He applied his style to the National Archives building, the former Arias Feraud house, the Municipal House and the Presidential Palace, where he collaborated with Roberto Lewis, who executed all the frescoes, notably those of the Yellow Hall and the Tamarind Hall (based on the tamarind trees of Taboga Island).

He painted portraits of the Presidents of the Republic of Panama from 1904 until 1948.

His most important works are preserved in the Presidency of the Republic, in the National Theatre and in the main hall of the Juan Demóstenes Arosemena Normal School in Santiago, Veraguas—his last, unfinished project. Roberto Lewis died on 22 September 1949, aged 74.

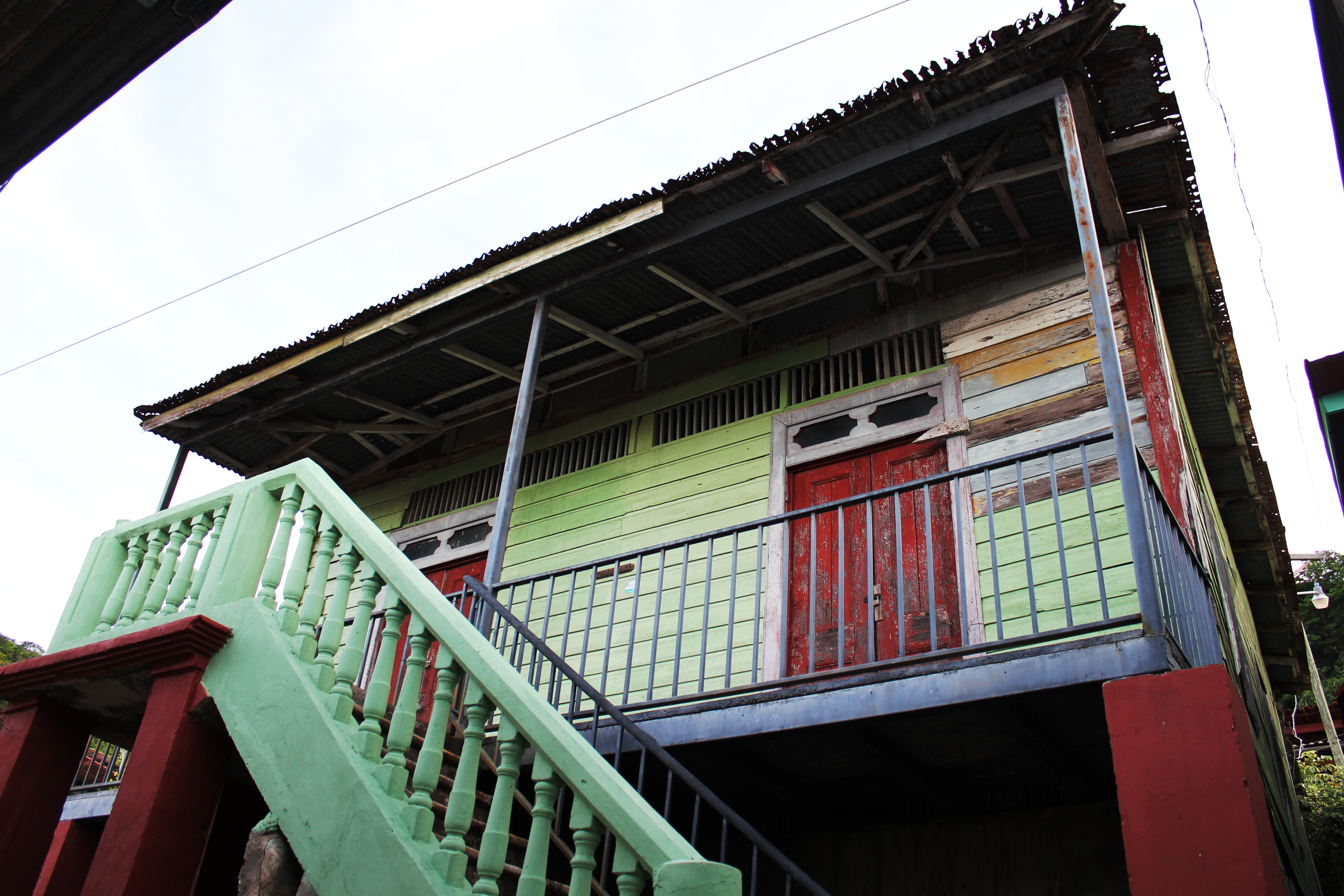
House of Roberto Lewis, located on Taboga Island.

His picturesque cabin on Taboga Island is part of the Taboga Historic Monumental Ensemble (declared by Law No. 6 of 13 March 2012).

In addition to painting, Lewis was also a sculptor: in La Chorrera there is a bust of the Panamanian poet Tomás Martín Feulliet (1832–1862), and in the General Headquarters of the Benemérito Firefighters of the Republic of Panama there is a medallion of the Panamanian leader Ricardo Arango (1839–1898).
