= Palacio de las Garzas =

Coordinates: 8°57′14″N 79°32′04″W

Presidential Palace
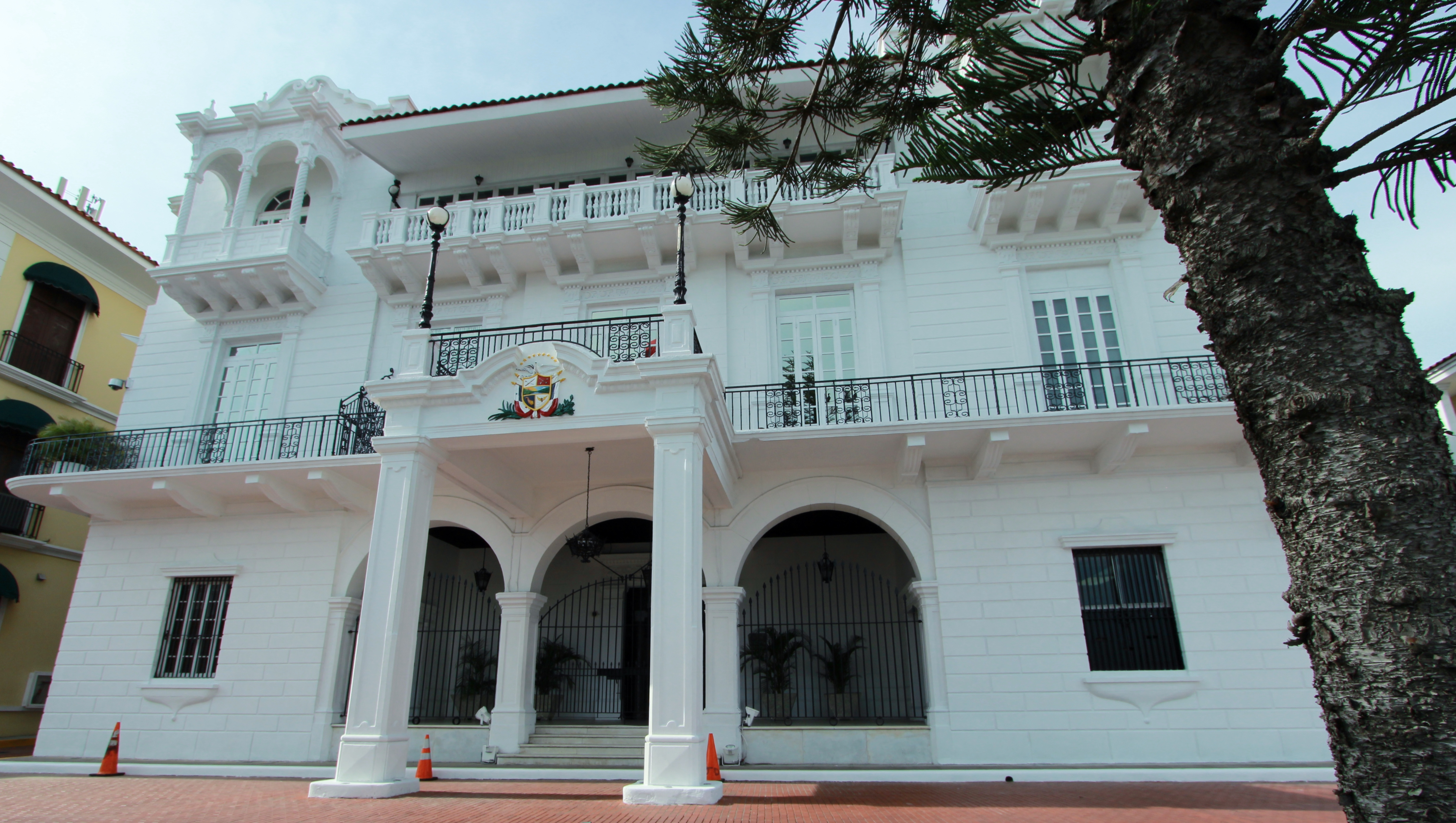
- Main view of the Palacio de las Garzas

General information
- Architectural style: Colonial
- Location: Panama City, Panama
- Construction started: 1673
- Completed: 1922

Design and construction
- Architect: Leonardo Villanueva Meyer

The Palacio de las Garzas (Presidential Palace o Heron's Palace) is the governmental office and residence of the President of Panama. It receives its name because of herons roaming freely in the courtyard. The herons were first brought to the building in 1922, by the former president Belisario Porras Barahona, at the suggestion of friend and famed Panamanian poet Ricardo Miró.

== History ==
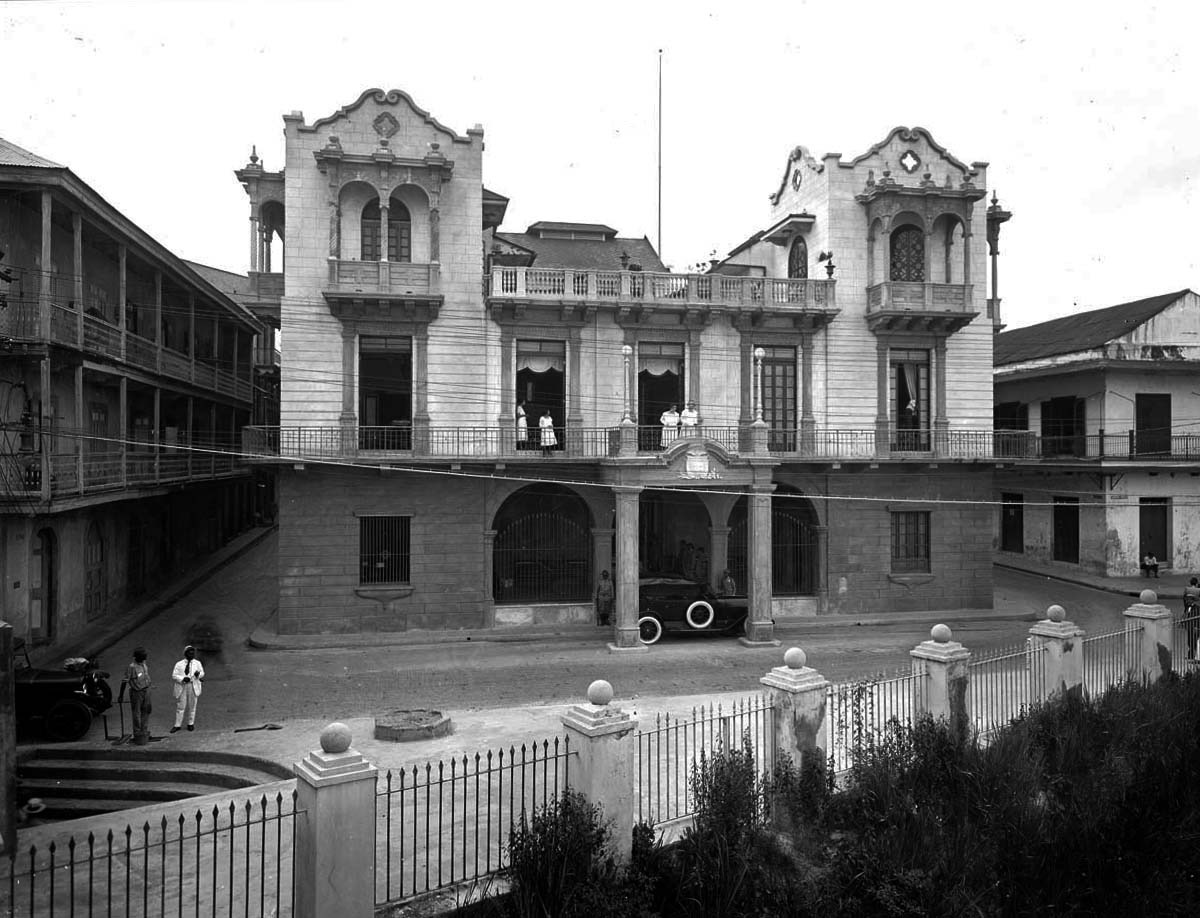
View of the Heron Palace around 1922

The Palacio de las Garzas is the seat of the Presidency of the Republic of Panama and one of the most iconic historic buildings in Panama City. Located in the San Felipe district of the city's Old Town, it has served as the residence and office of Panama's presidents since its conversion into a palace in 1875.

Construction of the original building began in 1673, by order of the judge of the Royal Audience of Panama, Luis de Lozada y Quiñónez, following the destruction of Panama Viejo during the sacking by the pirate Henry Morgan in 1671. The building was constructed on the new site of the city, in what is now the Old Town, and was initially intended for government functions. Over the centuries, the building served various roles, including as a Customs House and Bookkeeping Office in the 18th century.

In 1756, the building was almost completely destroyed by fire. After its reconstruction, it continued to serve multiple functions over the years, including as a bonded warehouse in 1821 and a boys' teacher training college between 1872 and 1875. During the 19th century, it also housed the Government House and, later, the National Bank of Panama.

In 1875, the building was officially designated the Presidential Palace, serving as the seat of the Presidency of the Republic of Panama. This function was consolidated in the following decades, as the building was adapted to the needs of the Panamanian government.

In 1922, President Belisario Porras Barahona ordered a comprehensive restoration and remodeling of the building to convert it into a modern presidential palace. Under the direction of architect Leonardo Villanueva Meyer, a second and third floors were added, which would serve as the presidential residence, and an Andalusian patio was incorporated on the second level. Key spaces, such as the Yellow Room and the presidential dining room, were also remodeled. The official inauguration of the new Palacio de las Garzas took place on August 3, 1923. Although the palace was inaugurated in 1923, it was not until 1938 that it became the exclusive property of the State of Panama, after the National Bank moved its headquarters to a new location on Central Avenue.

A distinctive feature of the Palacio de las Garzas is the gallery of presidential portraits, which began in 1855 under the direction of Colombian painter Epifanio Garay, who was commissioned to paint portraits of the presidents of Panama. Additionally, in 1934, during the visit of President Franklin D. Roosevelt, an elevator was installed in the building. The elevator was installed due to the difficulty of accessing the upper floors for the president, who suffered from mobility issues due to his paralysis. The elevator allowed the president convenient access to the upper rooms and spaces of the palace during his stay, facilitating his official visit.

The palace has been used as the residence and main office of most presidents, with the exception of a few, such as Laurentino Cortizo, Juan Carlos Varela, Ricardo Martinelli, Martín Torrijos, Mireya Moscoso, and Ernesto Pérez Balladares, who chose to maintain their residences and commute there daily.

== Architecture ==
=== Exterior ===
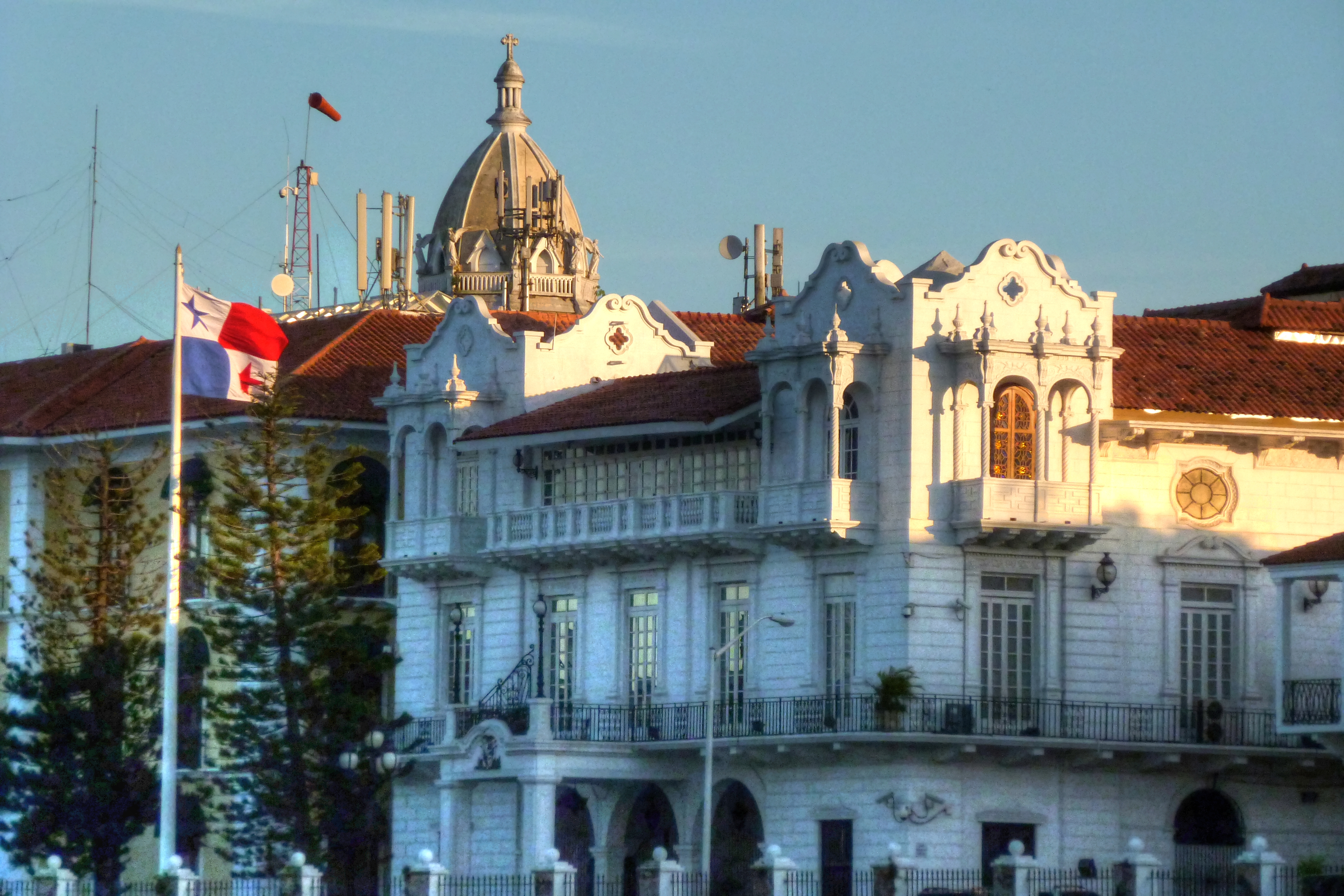
Presidential Palace - from the Cinta Costera

The Palacio de las Garzas is a colonial-style building. Following the restoration after the 1951 coup d'état, much of its original structure was recovered — including numerous bullet holes that remain visible as historical marks.

The main façade faces Avenida Eloy Alfaro, with a view of the Bay of Panama. Below this façade, facilities have been built for the Institutional Protection Service, including a small landing dock, a helipad, and offices for various presidential departments.

=== Interior ===
==== Main Courtyard ====
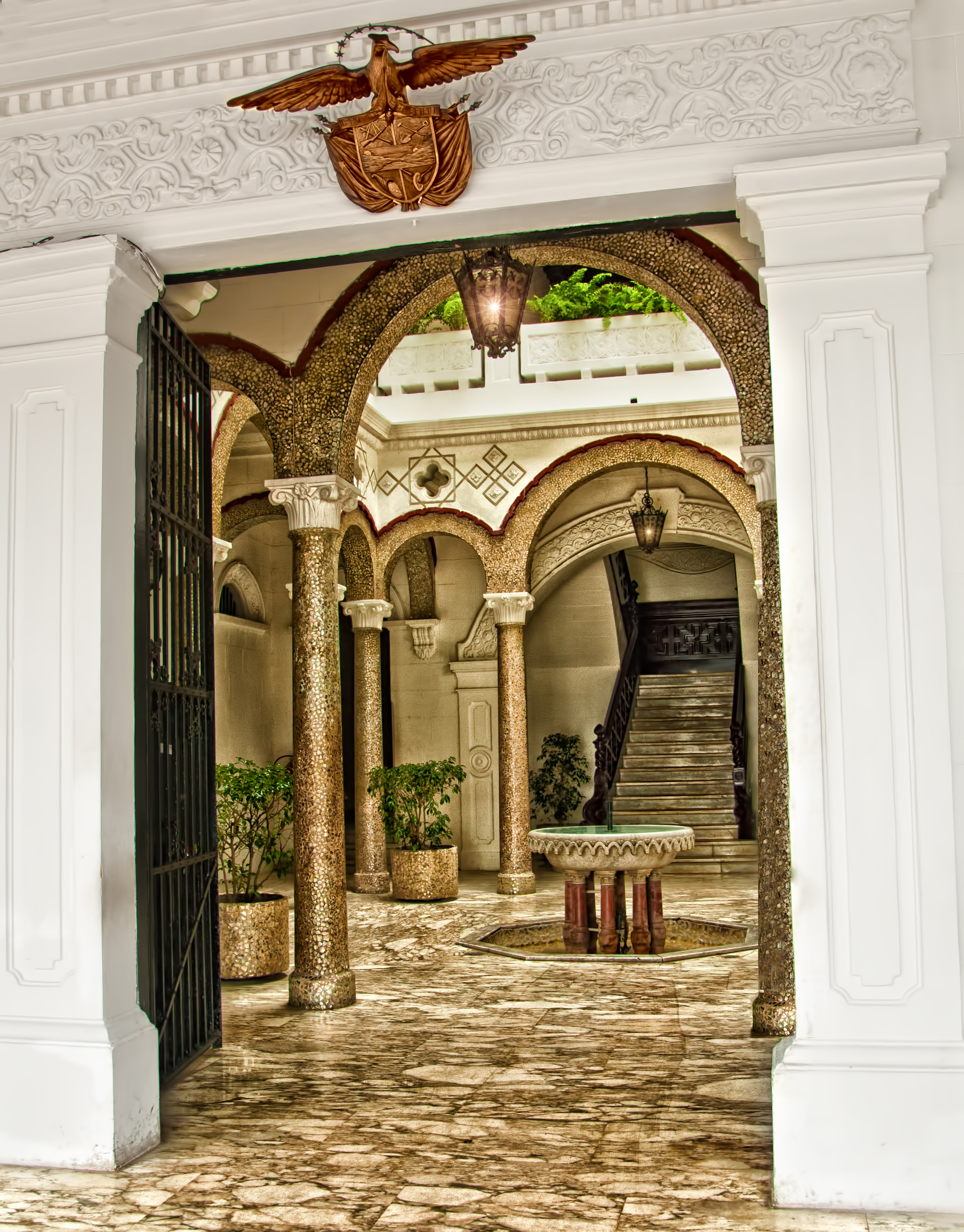
Main courtyard of the presidency

At the palace's entrance lies a courtyard with a central fountain, white marble floors, and mother-of-pearl columns. This is where the herons that give the palace its name reside. The birds, originally from the Darién region, were a gift from Panamanian poet Ricardo Miró to President Belisario Porras. The herons have not always been the same individuals, but traditionally there is one heron for each province in the country (which increased to ten after the creation of Panamá Oeste). When the palace hosts major events or summits with large delegations, the gray herons are temporarily relocated to Summit Municipal Park, located on the outskirts of Panama City.

==== Andalusian Courtyard and Presidential Office ====
On the second floor, there is an Andalusian-style courtyard with strong colonial influence. Among its columns stand five sculptures representing Law, Justice, Labor, Perseverance, and Duty. These allegorical figures were sculpted by Italian artist Gaetano Olivari in 1915.

This floor also houses the President's office, which features two doors — one leading to the secretarial offices, and another to a private library. Inside the library, a private staircase leads to the presidential residence on the third floor. One of the most striking elements of the office is the frieze, which displays a gallery of medallions with the faces of former Panamanian presidents. These medallions are placed throughout various parts of the building and include blank ones reserved for future leaders.

==== Yellow Room ====
This is one of the most important rooms in the palace, as it hosts official state ceremonies. The frieze of the room is decorated with 41 portraits of Panama's early governors, members of the Provisional Government Junta, and Manuel Amador Guerrero, the country's first president.

One of the main attractions of this room is a series of eleven murals that graphically depict the history of Panama. These murals begin with the arrival of the Spanish, the encounter of Vasco Núñez de Balboa with the South Sea, and Panama's independence. Another notable mural is an allegory of the Panamanian nation, represented as a woman dressed in a pollera, receiving homage from ships of many nations. These works were painted by Panamanian artist Roberto Lewis (1874–1949).

==== Tamarind Room ====
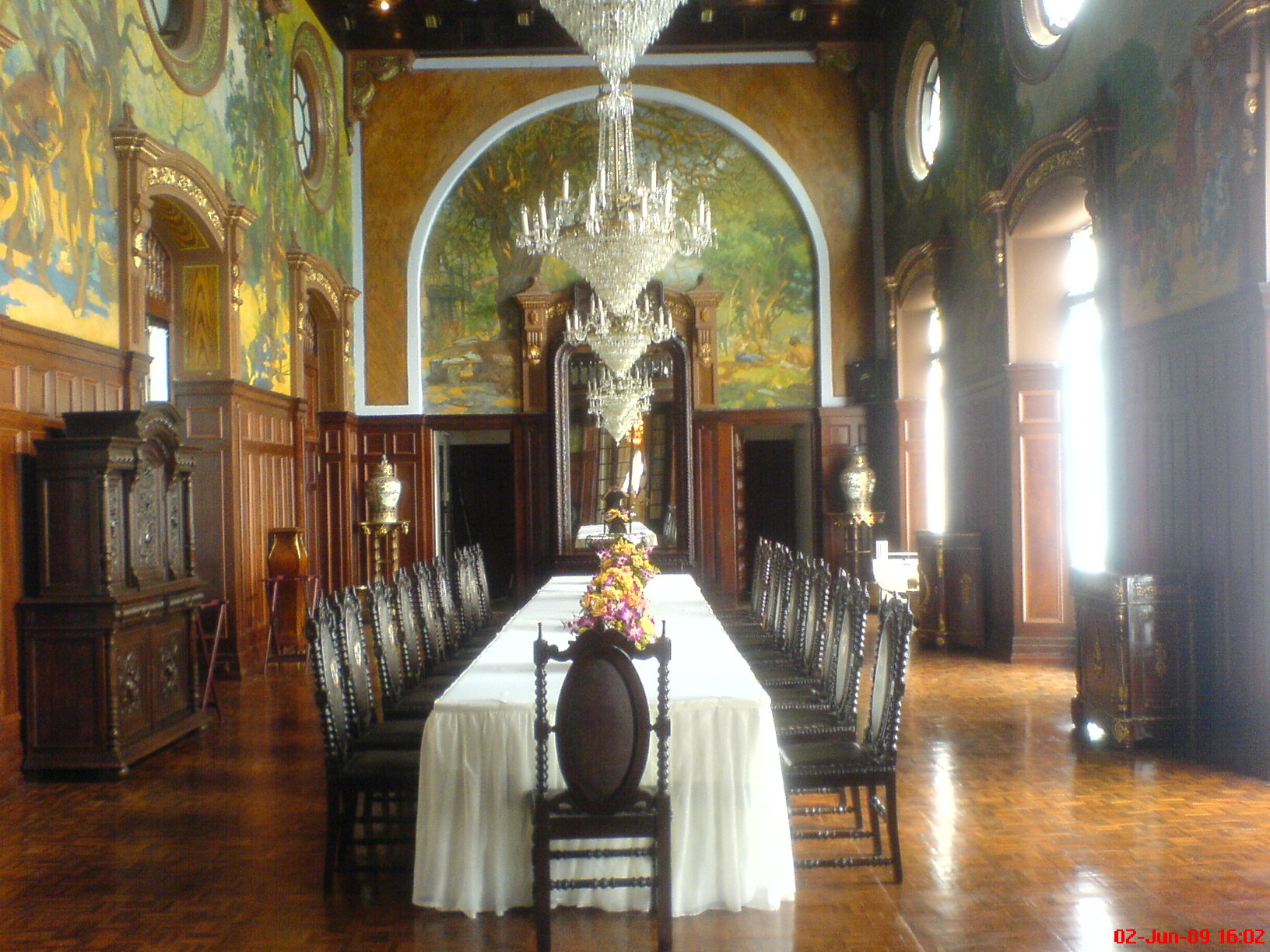
Tamarind Room

Located next to the Yellow Room, this is the presidential dining hall. It is decorated with large murals depicting the harvest of tamarinds and hunting scenes from Taboga Island. These murals were commissioned in 1938 by President Juan Demóstenes Arosemena and painted by Roberto Lewis.

==== Cabinet Room ====
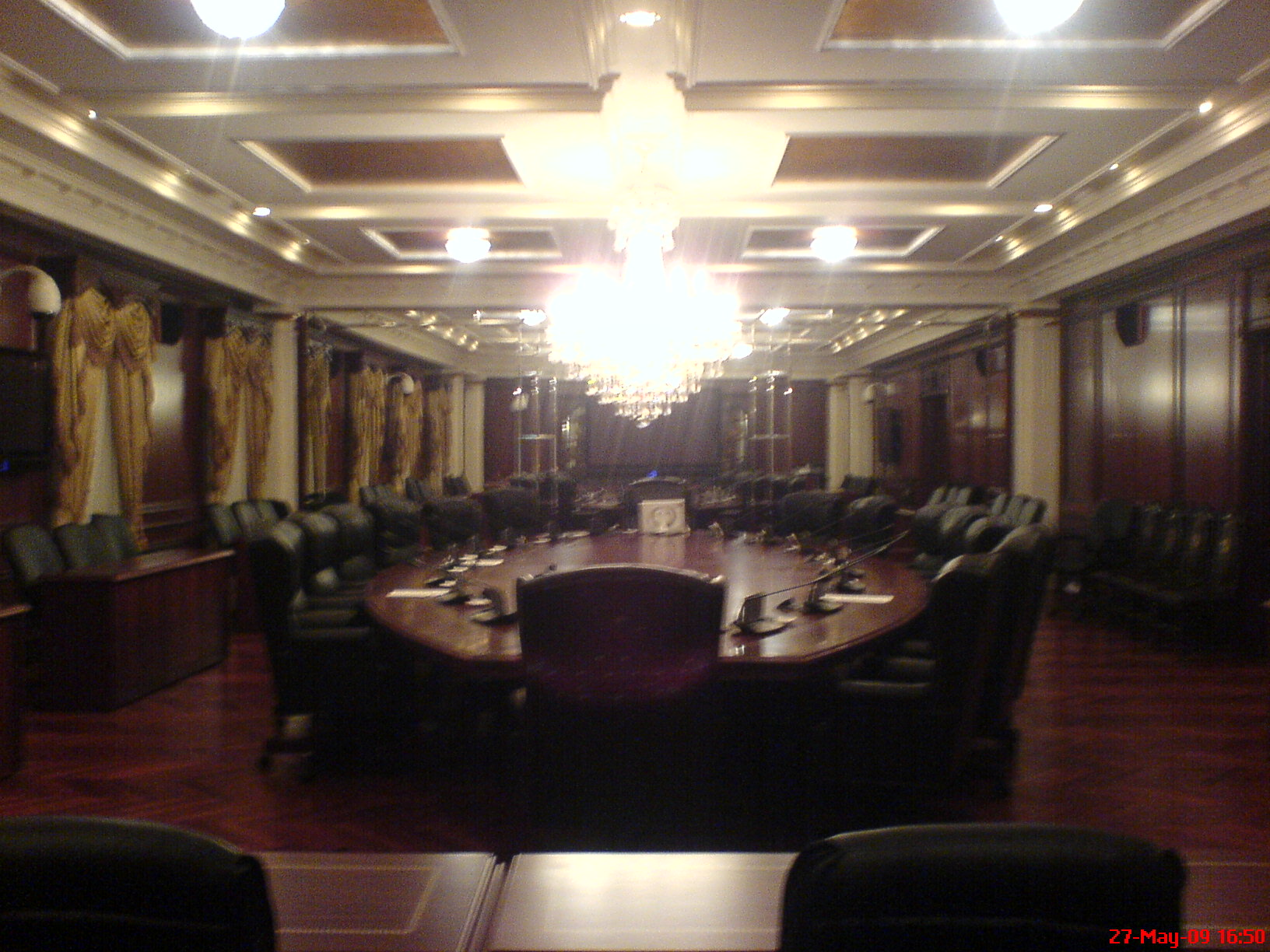
Cabinet Room

Named Belisario Porras in honor of the former president, this is one of the newest rooms in the palace. It serves as a meeting space for Cabinet Ministers and special guests. The room is equipped with cutting-edge multimedia technology, acoustic insulation, and security systems.

==== Presidential Residence ====
The presidential residence is located on the third floor of the palace, where the president and their family live. The area includes a reception room, five bedrooms (including the master suite), a small kitchen, private dressing room, family living room with a balcony overlooking the Bay of Panama, a private study, and an English-style dining room.

One of the most treasured features is the Moorish Room, designed in the style of the Palace of Aranjuez and the Alhambra in Spain.

== See also ==
- Politics of Panama
- Institutional Protection Service
- History of Panama
