= Art Museum of the Americas =

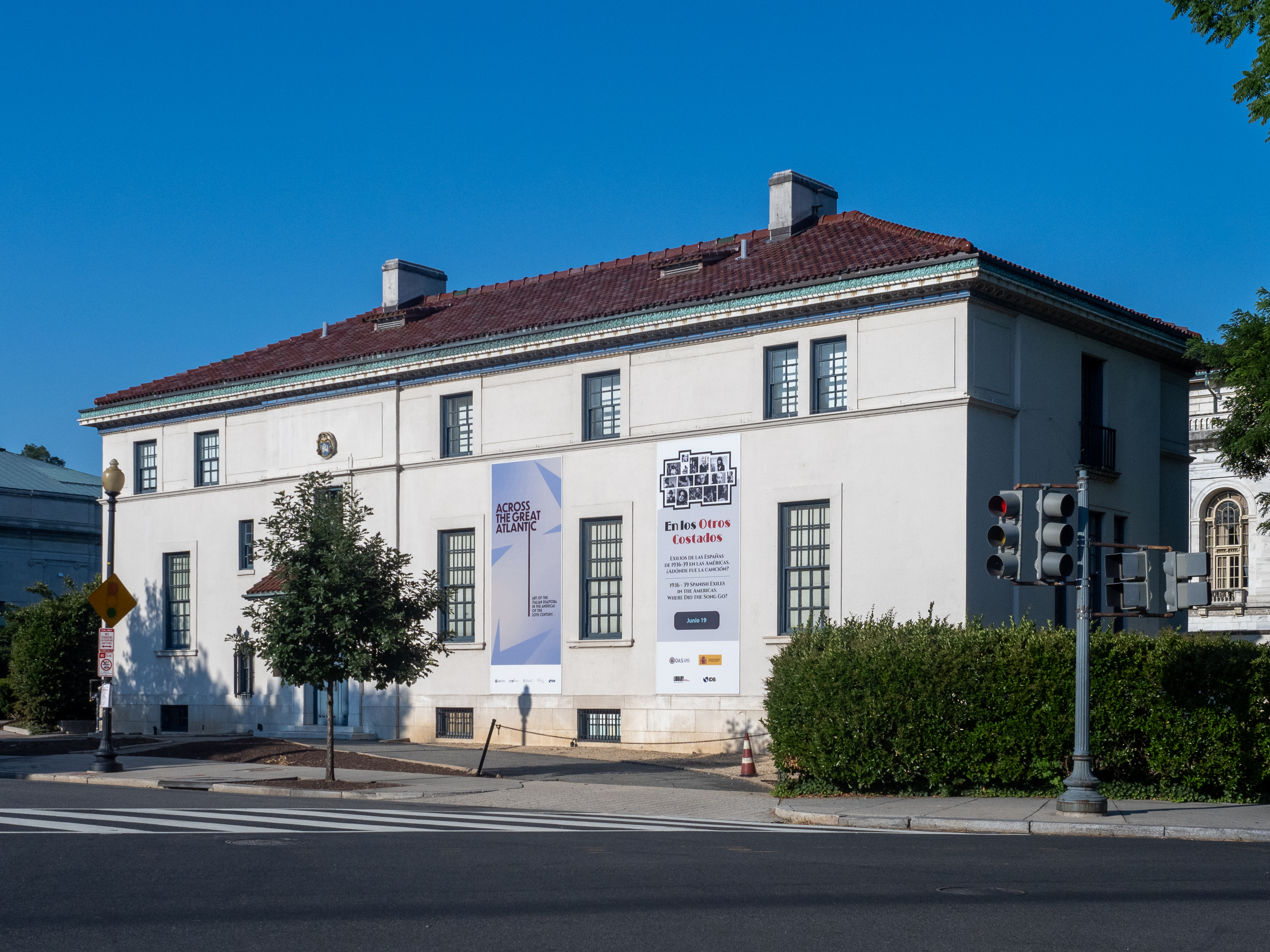

- Location within Washington, D.C.
- Former name: Museum of Modern Art of Latin America
- Established: 1976; 50 years ago
- Location: 201 18th Street NW Washington, DC 20006
- Coordinates: 38.892914°N 77.041495°W
- Type: Art museum
- Director: Adriana Ospina
- Curator: Adriana Ospina
- Owner: Organization of American States
- Public transit access: Farragut West
- Website: http://www.museum.oas.org/

Art Museum of the Americas (AMA), located in Washington, D.C., was the first art museum in the United States primarily devoted to exhibiting works of modern and contemporary art from Latin America and the Caribbean. The museum was formally established in 1976 by the Organization of American States (OAS) as the Museum of Modern Art of Latin America. Artists represented in the AMA's permanent collection include Carlos Cruz-Diez, Candido Portinari, Pedro Figari, Fernando de Szyszlo, Amelia Peláez, and Alejandro Obregón.

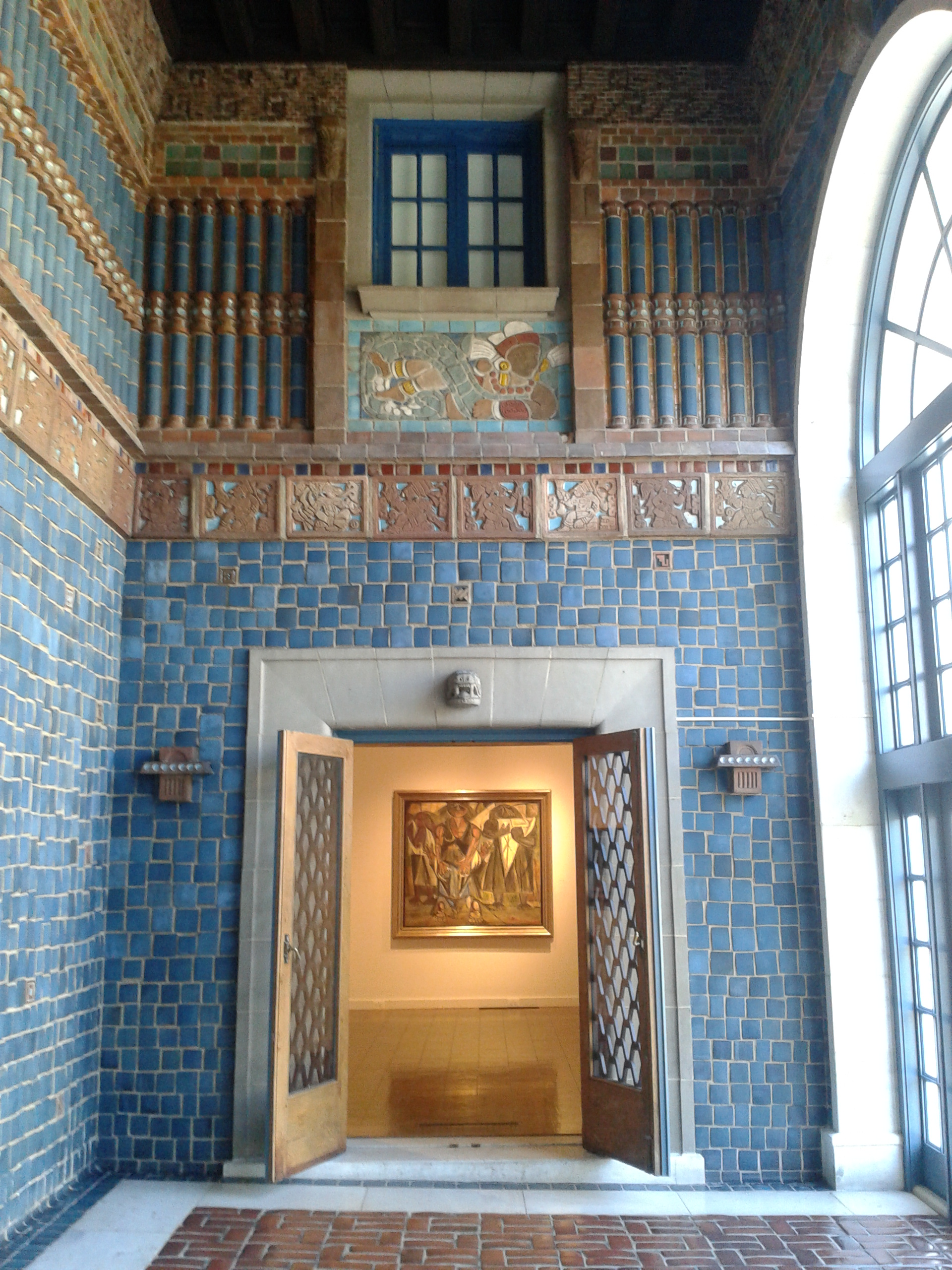
Interior courtyard of the museum

The art collection of the OAS was initiated under the organization's Visual Arts Unit, beginning with the first donated artwork by the Brazilian neo-realist artist Portinari, in 1949. In the 1957 the Permanent Council of the OAS establish an acquisitions fund, in order to build up a permanent collection of artworks by significant contemporary artists from the member states of the OAS. A number of works were also purchased from or donated directly by artists, after the temporary exhibitions periodically held at the OAS gallery.

The Art Museum of the Americas itself was established in 1976 by OAS Permanent Council resolution, on the occasion of the United States Bicentennial. The museum opened in what was formerly the official residence of the OAS Secretary General, a Spanish Colonial-style structure designed in 1912 by the architect Paul Cret on October 14th, 1976.

Initially the permanent collection held some 250 artworks, expanding over the next quarter-century to over 2000 items of painting, sculpture, installations, photography, and drawing, from the early 20th century and onwards. In addition to its permanent collection of mainly Caribbean and Latin American art, AMA hosts temporary and special exhibitions from across the region, and provides educational seminars and lectures from invited speakers.

The Art Museum of the Americas has also expanded its programs to include evening events, such as Art After Dark, with cutting edge music, video, performance, and installation art.

In February 2025, the Trump administration canceled an exhibition featuring Black and LGBTQ+ artists due to it being identified as a "DEI program and event." The Trump administration's goal was to withdraw all funding that supported diversity, equity, and inclusion.

== Permanent collection ==
The history of the permanent collection of the Art Museum of the Americas has roots in the former Visual Arts Unit of the Organization of American States. Under this unit, the first donation of art was received in 1949, a gift of art critic Jose Gomez Sicre, who donated a painting by Brazilian artist Candido Portinari. In 1957 the OAS Permanent Council conferred institutional backing to the collection by establishing a modest Purchase Fund to support the acquisition of art for a collection that was to reflect the contemporary art of the member countries of the OAS to form an enduring cultural resource. Purchases made by the Visual Arts Unit were strongly linked to and influenced by the direction of its exhibition program, and a significant number of works were acquired directly from the artists on the occasion of a temporary exhibit at the OAS Gallery. In many cases, an OAS exhibition represented the artist's first individual exhibit outside of his/her country of origin.

When the museum officially opened in 1976, the collection numbered 250 works. Today, the collection has grown to close to 2000 objects in varying media including painting, sculpture, installations, prints, drawings and photographs.

Artists represented in the Art Museum of the Americas' permanent collection include:

- Mario Carreño Morales
- Carlos Cruz-Díez
- Pedro Figari
- Leonel González Chavarría
- Enrique Grau
- Humberto Ivaldi
- Roberto Matta
- Carlos Mérida
- Yolanda Mohalyi
- Armando Morales
- Alejandro Obregón
- Amelia Peláez
- Emilio Pettoruti
- Olga Piria
- Candido Portinari
- Emilio Sánchez (artist)
- Antonio Seguí
- Fernando de Szyszlo
- Joaquín Torres-García
- Rafael Soriano (painter)

== Mission ==
Art Museum of the Americas was the oldest museum of modern and contemporary Latin American and Caribbean art in the United States. It was part of the Organization of American States (OAS), an international public organization whose aim is to promote democracy, peace, justice, and solidarity among its 35 member countries.

AMA’s origins date back to the Visual Arts Unit of the Pan-American Union (now the OAS), and in the mid-20th century grew as one of the first catalysts of the parameters of modern art in Latin America and the Caribbean. Today the collection has more than two thousand works complementing and documenting this regional focus.

Much of the importance of this art collection is in its specialization on works that proved instrumental in the launching, particularly in the United States, of the careers of many who are now regarded as masters of mid-century Latin American and Caribbean art. The collection represents numerous significant artistic trends that have developed in Latin America, including new figuration, geometric abstraction and lyrical, conceptual art, optical and kinetic art, among other movements.

AMA continues to organize exhibitions and programs for young and emerging artists, providing a space for cultural expression, creativity, and dialogue while highlighting issues central to its parent organization (democracy, equitable development, human rights, justice and innovation) through the arts. This mission is strengthened through cutting-edge programming emphasizing art of a high technical caliber that simultaneously furthers dialogue on current relevant social and political matters.

== History ==
The museum was established in 1976 as the Museum of Modern Art of Latin America and has its roots in the initiatives undertaken by the OAS dating back to 1917, when it was known as Pan American Union (PAU). However, it was not until the 30s that the PAU vitalized itself as a promotional epicenter for Latin American art under the leadership of Concha Romero James, director of the Division of Intellectual Cooperation. Romero’s unit embarked on long-term projects such as creating an archive of art documents and initiating a temporary exhibitions program.

Beginning in 1948, Cuban art critic José Gómez Sicre continued and accentuated the work of his predecessor, advancing initiatives such as: the active publication of materials on Latin American art, technical assistance to both public and private institutions and individuals interested in the field of the arts, creating a program of exhibitions of young and emerging artists of the Americas, and the establishment of a collection and museum of Latin American and Caribbean art. This work contributed to the significance of AMA as an essential institution of the study of modern and contemporary Latin American art.

Much of the importance of this art collection is in its specialization on works that proved instrumental in the launching, particularly in the United States, of the careers of many who are now regarded as masters of mid-century Latin American and Caribbean art. The collection represents numerous significant artistic trends that have developed in Latin America, including new figuration, geometric abstraction and lyrical, conceptual art, optical and kinetic art, among other movements.

In February 2025, the AMA unexpectedly cancelled two art shows, one of African diaspora art and another curated by queer Trinidadian Canadian artist Andil Gosine. The cancellation came after President Donald Trump issued directives to eliminate DEI initiatives and review US funding for international organizations.
