= Isabel de Obaldía =

Panamanian glass artist

Isabel de Obaldía (born 1957) is a Panamanian glass artist. Her work is included in the collection of the Corning Museum of Glass.

== Biography ==
De Obaldía was born in Washington D.C., USA to French and Panamanian parents. She studied architecture at the University of Panama and drawing and painting at the École des Beaux-Arts in Paris. In 1979 she completed a bachelor's degree in graphic design and cinematography from the Rhode Island School of Design.

In 1990 she received the John Hauberg Fellowship from Pilchuck Glass School. In 2009, she won the Rakow Commission at the Corning Museum of Glass in New York.

De Obaldia is the step daughter of the Panamanian painter Guillermo Trujillo
