= Juan Manuel Cedeño =

Panamanian painter (1914–1997)

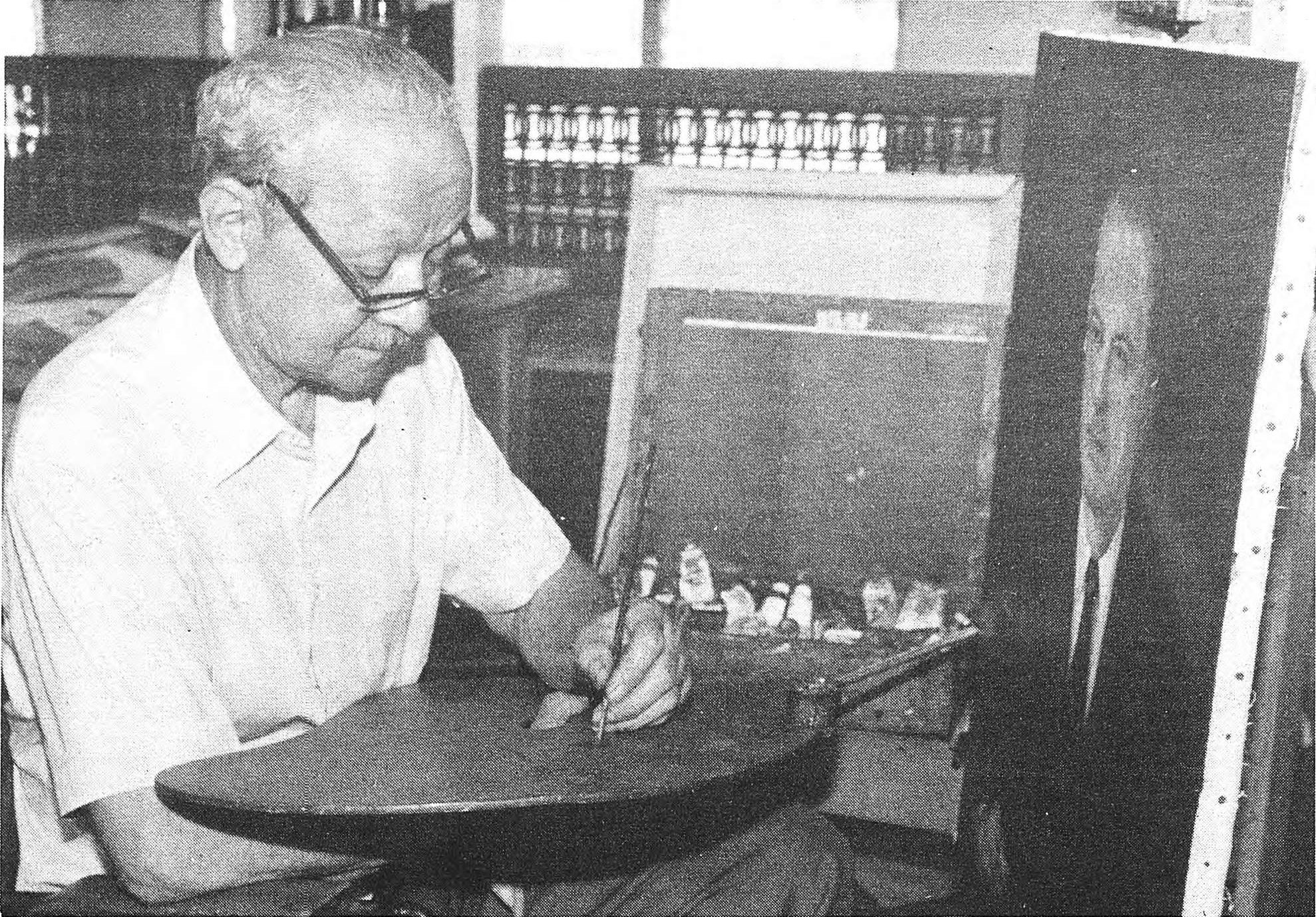
Juan Manuel Cedeño at work, 1994

Juan Manuel Cedeño (December 28, 1914 - August 11, 1997) was a Panamanian painter.

A native of La Villa de los Santos, Cedeño studied at the Escuela Nacional de Pintura in Panama, where his instructors included Humberto Ivaldi and Roberto Lewis. In 1948 he received his BFA at the Chicago Art Institute; he was also invited to study at the Polytechnical Institute of Mexico, where he worked alongside Diego Rivera and David Alfaro Siqueiros. From 1948 until 1967 he directed his alma mater, which was renamed the Escuela Nacional de Artes Plásticas in 1952; in addition, from 1967 until 1978 he taught at the University of Panama. His pupils included Trixie Briceño and Julio Zachrisson. Cedeño was among the first Panamanian artists to be influenced by cubism and futurism, but he was better known for his portraits. In 1995 he was commissioned by Gabriel Lewis Galindo to complete a series of paintings depicting important moments in Panamanian history.
