= Olga Sinclair =

Panamanian painter

- Born: Olga Sinclair; 1957 (age 68–69); Panama City, Panama
- Education: Academy of Applied Arts, Madrid; Arjona Studio (classical drawing); Santa María La Antigua University (BA, Interior Design); Giangranddi Studio (engraving); further studies in London
- Occupations: Artist, figurative painter
- Years active: 1971–present
- Known for: Figurative painting; portraiture; organizing large-scale community art events (2014 world-record simultaneous children’s painting)
- Movement: Figurative painting
- Spouse: Hans Risseeuw (m. 1987; divorced c. 2007)
- Children: Natasha; Suzanna

Olga Sinclair (born 1957 in Panama City) is an artist and figurative painter.

She participated for the first time in a collective exhibition amongst professional painters at the age of just 14.

She started painting studies with her father, the painter Alfredo Sinclair and went in 1976 to the Academy of Applied Arts in Madrid, Spain. There she also did three years classic art drawing lessons at the Arjona Studio.

Back in Panama she obtained her BA-degree in Interior Design at Santa María La Antigua University in 1984. At the same time she took engraving lessons in Giangranddi Studio. Then she continued her studies in London for another two years. In 1987 she married Hans Risseeuw (whom she divorced 20 years later) and they moved to Bolivia where Olga was Cultural Attaché to the Panamanian Embassy. After that they went to Jakarta, Indonesia where their two daughters Natasha and Suzanna were born. Since 1994 Olga and her family reside again in Panama. Olga is currently Panama's Cultural Ambassador.

== World record ==
On January 18, 2014, in Panama City, Sinclair organized 5,084 children to paint simultaneously for three minutes to break the world record. The piece depicted a set of Canal locks as the event commemorated 100 years of the Panama Canal.
