= Julio Zachrisson =

Panamanian graphic artist (1930–2021)

Julio Augusto Zachrisson (1930 – 18 December 2021) was a Panamanian graphic artist, long resident in Spain.

Zachrisson was born in Panama City, and began his studies in art under painter Juan Manuel Cedeño at the Instituto Nacional. He was identified with the group "Los Independientes". Along with Gilberto Maldonado Thibault, he traveled to Mexico for further study in 1952, visiting Honduras, El Salvador, and Guatemala on the way there; the trip introduced him to the injustice and poverty which defined the region. Arriving in Mexico, he began to attend La Esmeralda and became acquainted with José Luis Cuevas, Alberto Gironella, and Pedro and Rafael Coronel; he also began to make prints at the Taller de Gráfica Popular, to which he had been invited by Arturo García Bustos. He also made the acquaintance of Remedios Varo and Juan Soriano, the latter of whom introduced him to the prints of Francisco de Goya. In 1959 Zachrisson traveled to Europe for study at the Accademia di Belle Arti di Perugia; he then visited the Netherlands, Germany, and France before coming to Spain in 1961 to study Goya's work at the Museo del Prado. He took classes at the Academia de Bellas Artes de San Fernando to take advantage of its printing presses. Eventually he married and settled in Madrid, where he remained until his death. He returned to painting in 1976. Zachrisson died in Madrid on 18 December 2021.

Two prints by Zachrisson are owned by the Museum of Modern Art, and he is represented as well in the collection of the Art Museum of the Americas. Another print is in the collection of the Smithsonian American Art Museum. His career was the subject of the 2025 documentary The Sorcerer by Félix “Trillo” Guardia.
