= Panama Canal Museum =

Coordinates: 8°57′07″N 79°32′05″W

- Museo del Canal Interoceánico de Panamá
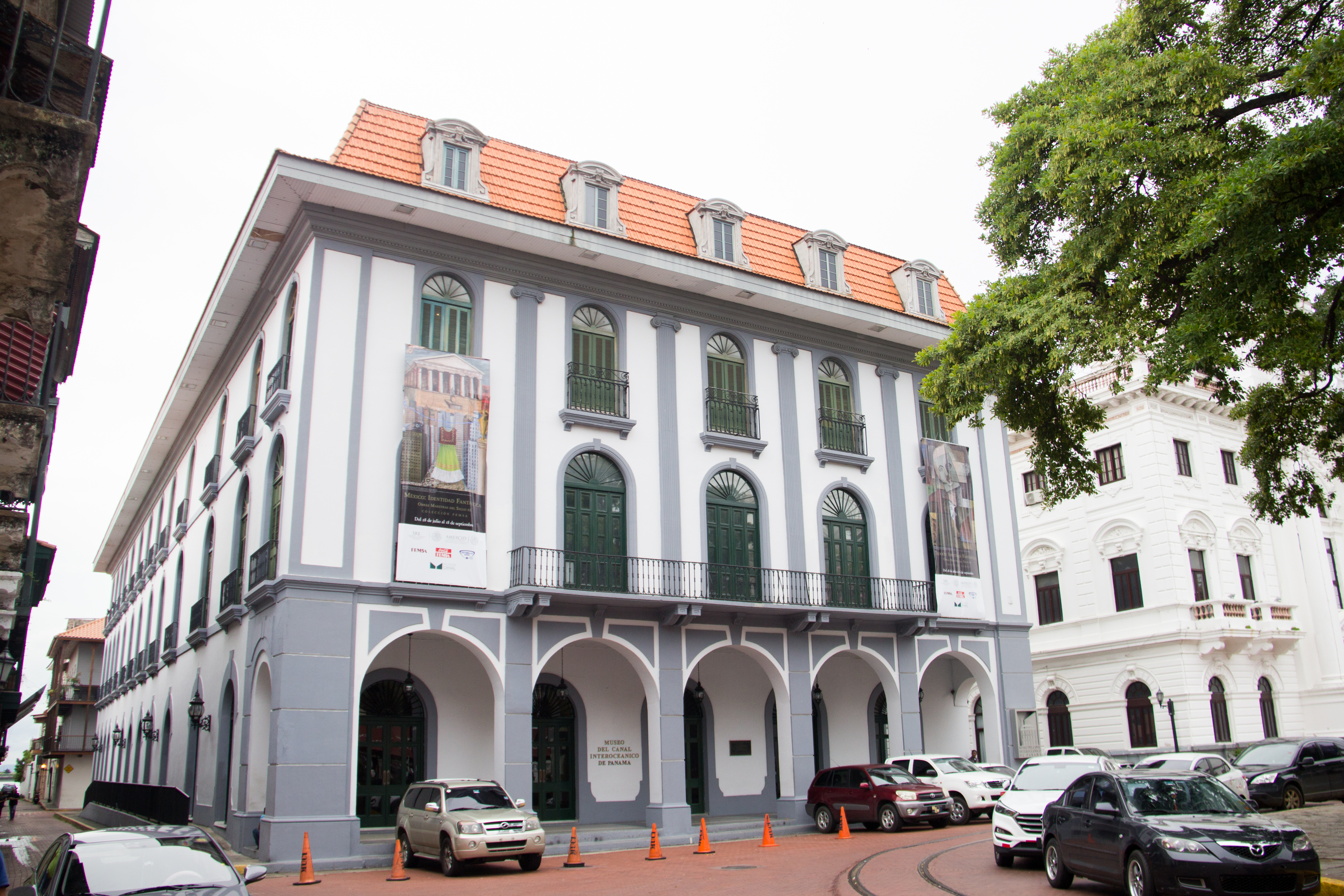
- The museum's facade.
- Established: 1997
- Location: Panama City, Panama

The Panama Canal Museum (Spanish: Museo del Canal Interoceánico de Panamá) is a non-profit and public museum located in Panama City, Panama. Established in 1997, the museum is devoted to the history of the construction of the Panama Canal in its various stages, including the first French construction attempt, the later construction by the United States, and the eventual transfer to Panamanian control.

This museum is located in Plaza Catedral or Independence Plaza, on the corners of 5th and 6th streets. Originally the building was the Grand Hotel, built by French businessman, George Loew, in 1874 and 1875. It was the most luxurious hotel in Panama City, however its history would be short-lived since it was sold to Count Ferdinand de Lesseps in 1881. From then on it would be the headquarters of the Universal Company of the French Interoceanic Canal. Most of the building was used for offices, except for one floor which would lodge high-ranking employees.

After the French canal failure, the current Panama Canal Museum building was used by the United States Canal Commission for 4 years until they moved to Balboa in 1910. The Panamanian government bought the building in 1915 to use it as public offices. As the years passed, it deteriorated like most of the buildings in Casco Viejo. In 1996 the Board of Trustees of the Interoceanic Canal Museum was created. Restoration work started immediately and the first part of the museum was inaugurated in 1997, while the full construction took six years.
