= National Theatre of Panama =

Theatre in the old city of Panama, Panama

- Teatro Nacional de Panamá
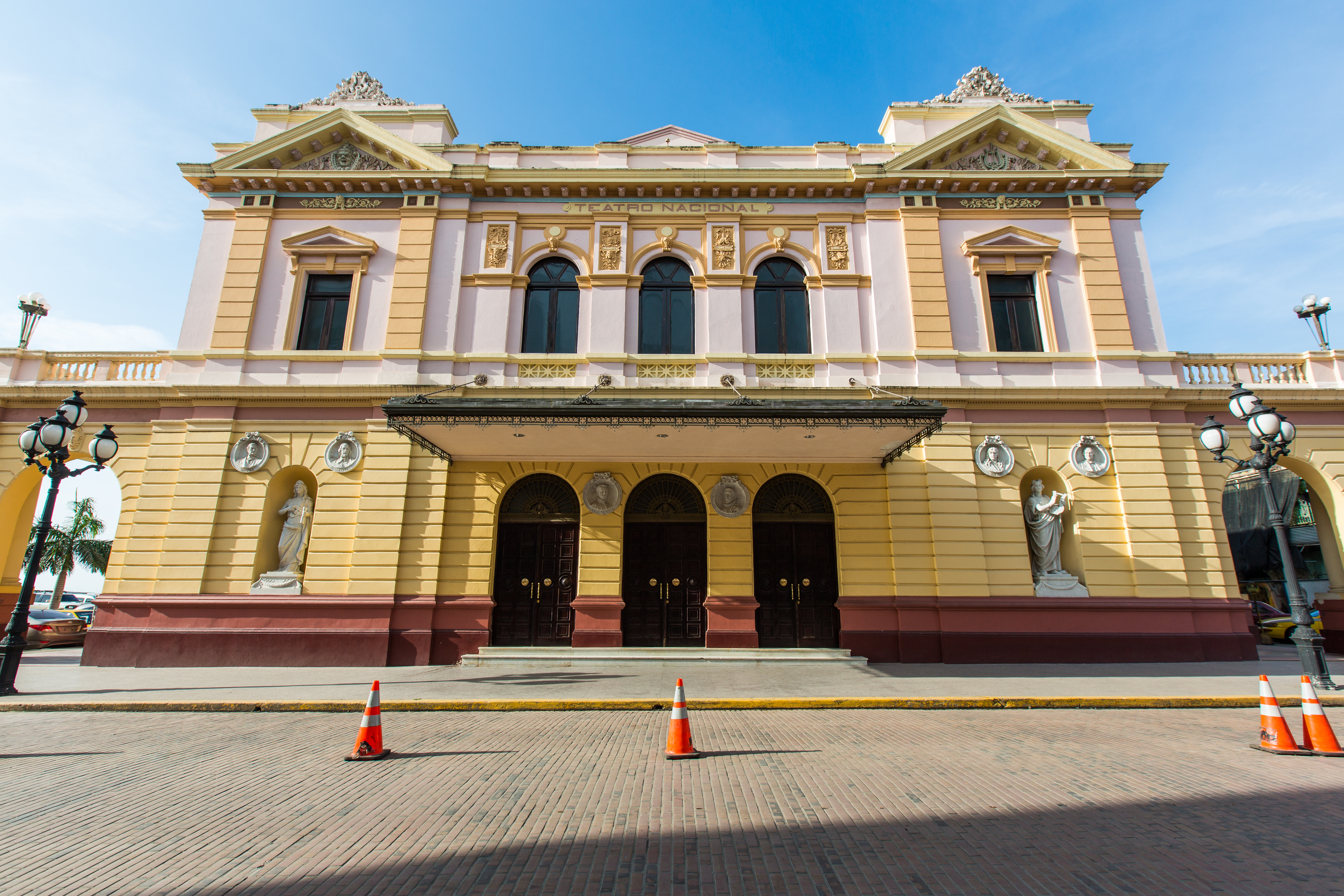
- Main facade of the National Theatre of Panama.
- Interactive map of National Theatre of Panama
- Address: Calle 3 Catedral y Ave B, Casco Antiguo; Panama City; Panama
- Capacity: 873

Construction
- Opened: October 1, 1908
- Rebuilt: 1970s and early 2000s
- Architect: Genaro Ruggieri

The National Theatre of Panama (Spanish: Teatro Nacional de Panamá) is located in the old city of Panama, next to the church of San Francisco and the Plaza Bolívar. Its construction was ordered by Act 52 of 1904.

The National Theatre is part of a cross-shaped building. Ceiling frescos were done by famed Panamanian Robert Lewis. The other part is occupied by National Palace. The theater was designed by Italian architect Genaro Ruggieri, with a style of Italian operetta theater, and opened on October 1, 1908.
