= Institutional Protection Service =

Institutional Protection Service Servicio de Protección Institucional
- Panama SPI emblem
- Abbreviation: SPI
- Motto: Democracia Orden Constitucional; Democracy and Constitutional Order

Agency overview
- Formed: 1990

Jurisdictional structure
- Operations jurisdiction: Panama
- Constituting instrument: Decree Law No. 2, 1999
- Specialist jurisdiction: Protection of international or domestic VIPs, protection of significant state assets

Operational structure
- Overseen by: Ministry of the Presidency
- Headquarters: Panama City
- Agency executive: Julio Cesar Jean-Louis Garrido, Director General
- Parent agency: Panamanian Public Forces

Website
- www.spi.gob.pa

The Institutional Protection Service (Spanish: Servicio de Protección Institucional) is a service branch of the Panamanian Public Forces.

== History ==
The Institutional Protection Service was organized in March 1990 to assume the functions previously assigned to the former presidential guard.

It was created through Decree Law No. 2 of July 8, 1999.

== Duties ==
Based in Panama City, the Institutional Protection Service is attached to the Ministry of the Presidency and is in charge of providing protection to the Panamanian authorities such as the President of the Republic of Panama, the Ministers, Ex-Presidents and the Ex-Vice Presidents in charge of the Presidency of the Republic, as provided in this Decree Law; as well as contributing to the maintenance of internal public order, peace, citizen security, protecting public spaces and buildings.

Some of its functions also include the protection of the banks of the Panama Canal and surveillance of public spaces such as the Cinta Costera and Calzada de Amador.

== Organisation ==
The Institutional Protection Service has approximately more than 2,000 units that are distributed in 3 different company groups.

As part of this organization they have the political and executive level, coordination level, advisory level, supervisory level, support level and within the operational level they have 3 groups which are:

=== Presidential Protection Group ===
The Presidential Protection Group (Spanish: Grupo de Protección Presidencial) has the responsibility of providing protection and escorting Important Persons.

=== Presidential Guard Battalion ===
The Presidential Guard Battalion (Spanish: La Guardia Presidencial) has the responsibility of ensuring the security of the facilities, as well as the protocol of honor, the custody of the banks of the Canal, the security of different facilities where official events or presidential summits are held. Organized into the Presidential Band and 5 companies, the 5th historical.

=== Special Anti-Terrorism Group ===
The Special Anti-Terrorism Group (Spanish: Grupo Especial Antiterrorismo) is a group of special forces under the command of the President of the Republic.

== Training ==
In terms of training, there is an Integral Training and Training Academy, in which the personnel are trained and remain in constant training, which has allowed the professional level of the units to be raised, maintaining constant cooperation with the rest of the Public Force, where he has participated in various exercises, such as the last Panamax event, held in the country; Many of the units that make up the Institution have received training in Central, South American and European countries.

The Institutional Protection Service has been a model for the creation of similar Institutions in other Central American countries.

== Equipment ==
Model	Origin	Type
Glock 17	Austria	Semi-automatic pistol
Heckler & Koch MP5	Germany	Submachine gun
CZ Scorpion Evo 3	Czech Republic	Submachine gun
FN P90	Belgium	Personal defence weapon
AMD-65	Hungary	Assault rifle
M4 carbine	United States	Assault rifle
M16 rifle	United States	Assault rifle
M40A5	United States	Sniper rifle
SVD Dragunov	Soviet Union	Sniper rifle
PKM	Soviet Union	Machine gun
