= Guillermo Trujillo =

Panamanian painter (1927–2018)

- Born: January 1, 1927; Horconcitos, Chiriquí, Panama
- Died: January 1, 2018
- Education: Studied in Panama and Madrid
- Known for: Painting
- Notable work: Iconografía del Cantoral Chocoe, Tres Maestros
- Style: Modern art; incorporation of native and hieratic elements
- Relatives: Isabel de Obaldía (daughter)
- Awards: Honorable Mention, Biennial of São Paulo (1959)

Guillermo Trujillo (1927-2018) was a painter from Panama. He was born in Horconcitos, Chiriqui, Panama. He started his studies in Panama and completed them in Madrid. In 1959 he obtained an Honorable Mention in the Biennial of São Paulo, and has continued to receive awards. Trujillo incorporated elements of native art and hieratic figures in a very contemporary style in his canvases. His compositions included political and social satires, as well as man related to nature. His works Iconografía del Cantoral Chocoe and Tres Maestros. His daughter is the celebrated painter Isabel de Obaldía born in 1957.
