= Armando Morales =

Nicaraguan painter

- Born: Armando Morales; January 15, 1927; Granada, Nicaragua
- Died: November 16, 2011 (aged 84); Miami, Florida, U.S.
- Known for: Painting
- Notable work: Spook-Tree
- Awards: Central American Painting Contest "15 de Septiembre" (1956)

Armando Morales (January 15, 1927 – November 16, 2011) was an internationally renowned Nicaraguan painter. Morales is considered one of the most important painters of Nicaragua.

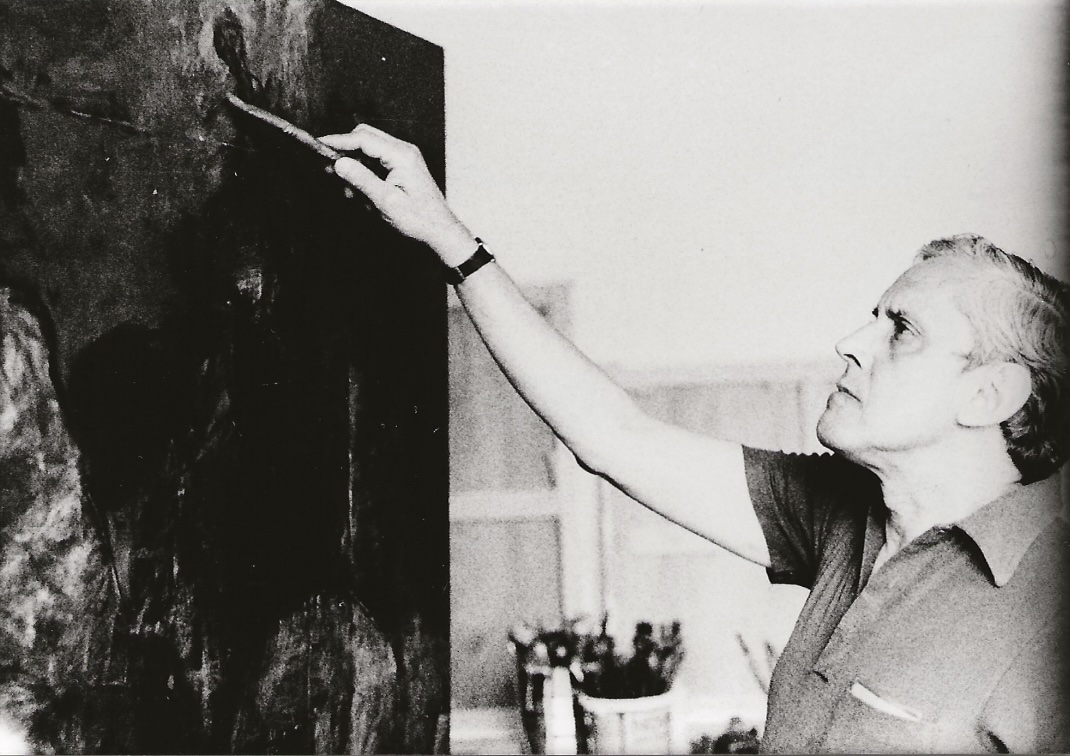
Armando Morales, Paris, 1984. Photo by John Oakes.

Morales, who was born in Granada, Nicaragua, received many awards for his works. He received his first award at the Central American Painting Contest "15 de Septiembre" (September 15) which was held in Guatemala in 1956. He received the award for a painting which he named "Spook-Tree". That same painting was later bought by the Museum of Modern Art in New York. The next year some of his paintings were featured at an exhibition called "Six Nicaraguan Artists" in Washington, he received excellent reviews and sold all his featured paintings.

Morales' work was exhibited at seven major shows from 1984 to 2000 at the Galerie Claude Bernard, a prominent gallery in Paris. The Gallery has published several catalogs and posters of his work. He died in Miami, Florida, USA.
