= Alfredo Sinclair =

Panamanian artist

- Born: 8 December 1914
- Died: 2 February 2014 (aged 99)
- Education: School of Fine Arts, Buenos Aires, Argentina
- Known for: Painting
- Notable work: Mancha
- Children: Olga Sinclair

Alfredo Sinclair (8 December 1914 – 2 February 2014) was a Panamanian artist. He was born in Panama City. He studied with Humberto Ivaldi at the National School of Painting and later in Argentina, between 1947 and 1951.

He had his first contact with the painting in the studio of painter Humberto Ivaldy. He studied painting at the School of Fine Arts in Buenos Aires, Argentina between 1947 and 1951, under the tutelage of Jorge Soto Acebal. He taught drawing and painting at the School of Architecture and was a founder of the School of Fine Arts at the University of Panama. Since 1950 he has been conducting various art exhibitions in Panama and around the world.

As a painter he worked light in collage and mixed media applied by bright colors. He entered the figurative but was known as the father of abstract painting in Panama. He began his career using semi-abstract references to urban congestion, as well as fish, insects and other animals. In the 1970s he changed his style to one of almost complete abstraction, with evocative paintings of biblical tables or walls cave paintings. Later, he took as a resource the faces of children, becoming an essential feature of his works.

He was named "Exemplary Citizen of Panama" by civic clubs in 1986. In 1991 he received the Order Vasco Nunez de Balboa in rank of Commander. In 2000 he received the Award in the Arts Excellencies, by the Museum of Contemporary Art. In 2004 he received the Medal Andrés Bello Convention, the first Panamanian to receive such an award. In spite of the fact that the Panamanian public did not understand much of his art, in 1955 he was awarded a prize for a piece that included bits of glass. With the passage of time Sinclair's painting followed the lines of a lyrical abstraction that went from collages to soft and luminous compositions. One of his most famous works is "Mancha". Sinclair died on 2 February 2014 from heart failure at the age of 99. His daughter Olga Sinclair is also a renowned Panamanian artist.

== Known works ==
- Frutas Tropicales
- River Landscape
- The last gleam of sunshine, Kinloch, North Island, New Zealand
- Mancha
