= Humberto Ivaldi =

Panamanian painter

Humberto Ivaldi (December 24, 1909 – March 10, 1947) was a Panamanian painter and director of the National School of Painting in Panama City from 1939 until his death in 1947. His pupils included Juan Manuel Cedeño.

He worked with many Panamanian painters, including: Oduber, Silvera, Jeanine, Benitez and Alfredo Sinclair.
