= List of political parties in Panama =

This article lists political parties in Panama.

Panama has a multi-party system. Although there are three major political parties, no one party often has a chance of gaining power alone, and parties must work with each other to form coalition governments.

Parties with fewer than 30,000 members are not recognized by the Tribunal Electoral, and as a result, they are not able to participate in Panama's general elections.

== The parties ==
=== Parliamentary parties ===
The following are parliamentary parties.

Name	Acronym	Ideology	Deputies	Flag
Realizing Goals; Realizando Metas	RM	Right-wing populism Conservative liberalism	15 / 71	
Democratic Revolutionary Party; Partido Revolucionario Democrático	PRD	Social democracy Populism	12 / 71	
Democratic Change; Cambio Democrático	CD	Conservatism; Economic liberalism	8 / 71	
Panameñista Party; Partido Panameñista	PP	National conservatism Right-wing populism	8 / 71	
Another Way Movement; Movimiento Otro Camino	MOCA	Anti-corruption; Big tent	3 / 71	
People's Party; Partido Popular	PP	Christian democracy Conservatism	2 / 71	
Alliance Party; Partido Alianza	A	National liberalism	2 / 71	
Nationalist Republican Liberal Movement; Movimiento Liberal Republicano Nacionalista	MOLIRENA	National liberalism Conservatism	1 / 71	

=== Other active parties ===
- MLN-29
- Broad Front for Democracy

=== Defunct parties ===
- Moral Vanguard of the Fatherland
- People's Party of Panama
- Workers Party (Marxist–Leninist)
- Independent Social Alternative Party

== See also ==
- Politics of Panama
- Liberalism in Panama
