= José Raúl Mulino =

President of Panama since 2024

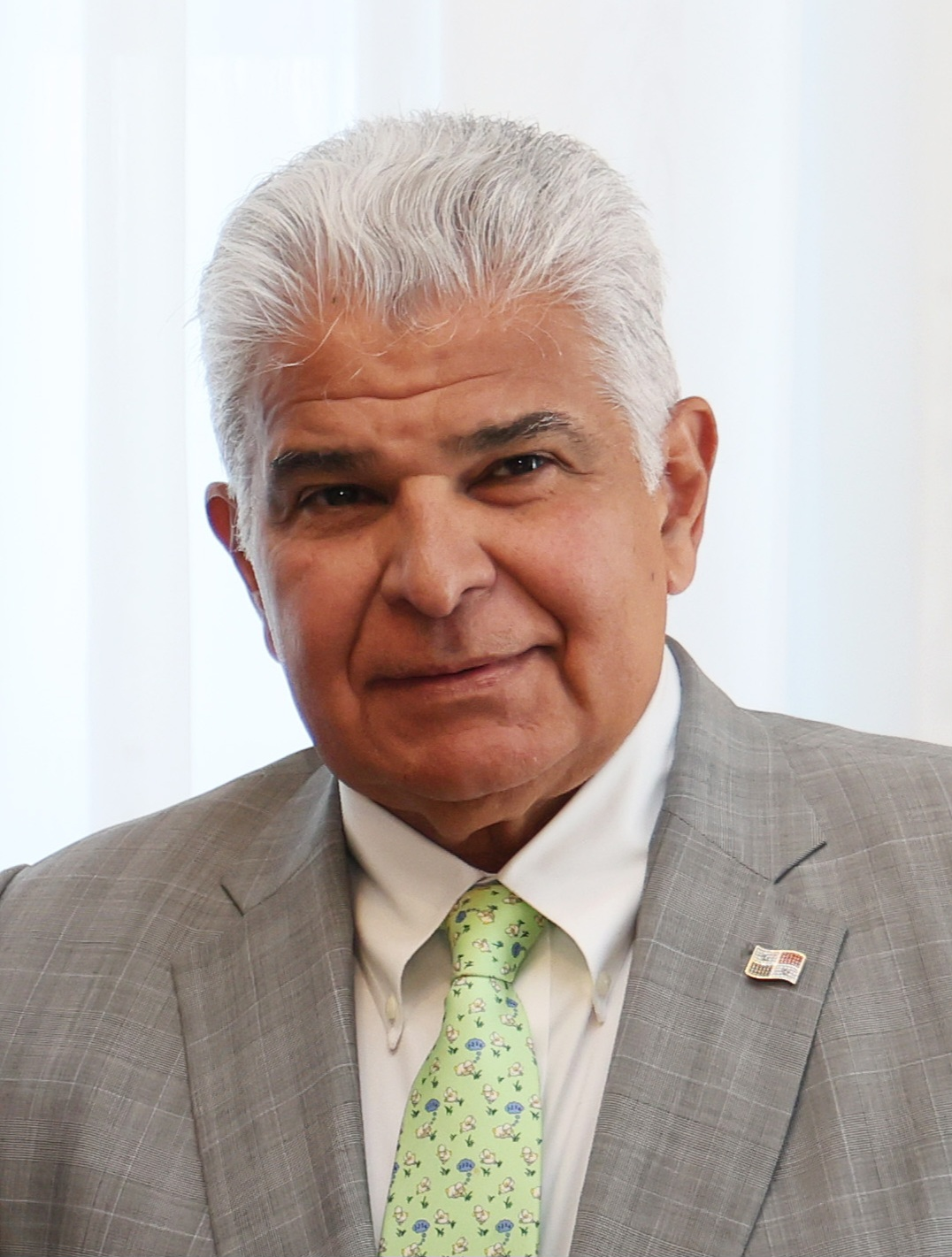
- Mulino in 2024

39th President of Panama
- Incumbent
- Assumed office 1 July 2024
- Vice President: Vacant (Note: Mulino was initially nominated for the 2024 presidential election as Ricardo Martinelli's running mate. After Martinelli's disqualification as candidate, Mulino assumed the replacement but without a running mate/vice president by electoral disposition.)
- Preceded by: Laurentino Cortizo
Ministerial offices
Minister of Public Security
In office 14 April 2010 – 30 June 2014
President	Ricardo Martinelli
Preceded by	Position established
Succeeded by	Rodolfo Aguilera
Minister of Government and Justice
In office 1 July 2009 – 15 July 2010
President	Ricardo Martinelli
Preceded by	Dilio Arcia Torres
Succeeded by	Roxana Méndez (as Minister of Government)
Minister of Foreign Relations
In office 1993–1994
President	Guillermo Endara
Preceded by	Julio Linares
Succeeded by	Gabriel Lewis Galindo

Personal details
- Born: 13 June 1959 (age 67) David, Panama
- Party: Realizing Goals (2022–present)
- Other political affiliations: Solidarity Party (1994–2006); Patriotic Union (2006–2011); Democratic Change (2011–2019)
- Spouse: Marisel Cohen de Mulino
- Children: 4
- Education: Universidad Católica Santa María La Antigua; Tulane University (LL.M)

José Raúl Mulino Quintero (Note: Latin American Spanish pronunciation: [xoˈse raˈul muˈlino kinˈtero]) (born 13 June 1959) is a Panamanian politician, diplomat and lawyer serving as the 39th president of Panama since 2024. He ran for president in the 2024 Panamanian election, which he won with 34% of the vote as the Realizing Goals candidate and a substitute for former President Ricardo Martinelli.

Mulino served as Minister of Government and Justice from 2009 to 2010 and Minister of Public Security from 2010 to 2014, both roles in the government of President Martinelli. He served as Deputy Minister (1990–1993) and Minister of Foreign Relations (1993–1994) in the government of President Guillermo Endara. From 1994 to 1995 he was a member of the National Council of Foreign Relations and Substitute Magistrate of the Civil Chamber of the Supreme Court of Justice.

Mulino was Martinelli's vice-presidential candidate in the 2024 election; after Martinelli was disqualified from running amid corruption scandals, he endorsed Mulino.

== Early life and legal career ==
Mulino was born on 13 June 1959 in David, Chiriquí. He is the son of the politician and governor of the province of Chiriquí José Mulino Rovira, and the businesswoman Nelly Quintero de Mulino. His brother is the diplomat José Javier Mulino.

He completed primary and secondary studies at the San Vicente de Paul School, in David, Chiriquí. He graduated university with a Bachelor of Science and Letters. He later studied law and political science at the Universidad Católica Santa María La Antigua, graduating in 1982. The following year he completed a master's degree in maritime law from Tulane University.

After graduating in law, he dedicated himself to private professional practice in the field of maritime law, and in 1988 he became a founding partner of the Fábrega, Molino y Mulino law firm. During that time he began his activism against the Panamanian military dictatorship during Manuel Noriega's regime, as a representative of various trade associations.

== Political career ==
In 1990 he was appointed Vice Minister of Foreign Affairs, during the government of president Guillermo Endara, after the restoration of democracy. After the death of Foreign Minister Julio Linares, he became Minister of Foreign Affairs and remained in office until the end of the administration in 1994. During his time as minister, he visited different governments and international organizations, and served as Head of the Negotiating Delegation of the Republic of Panama before the governments of the United States and the United Kingdom, for the negotiation and signing of mutual legal assistance treaties on criminal matters and crimes related to drug trafficking. From 1994 to 1995 he was a member of the National Council of Foreign Relations and Substitute Magistrate of the Civil Chamber of the Supreme Court of Justice.

In the Martinelli government he was appointed as Minister of Government and Justice in 2009 and served only one year, to 2010 where he submitted his resignation. He was thereafter appointed as Minister of Public Security from 2010 and served until the end of the administration in 2014. He received important tasks, becoming one of president Martinellis most trusted allies. As minister he reinforced security on the streets, through the application of police checkpoints, which Mulino claimed was a success as the police had managed to arrest fifteen thousand criminals trying to leave Panama, although some lawyers raised concern.

On 9 March 2012, he announced his resignation as Minister of Government and Justice, after disputes with the director of the National Police of Panama Gustavo Pérez, over the regulation of a new statute for security entities of the state. However, on 14 March he retracted his resignation, after the dismissal of Pérez from the position of police by president Martinelli. In July 2013, he was one of those in charge of handling the crisis of the North Korean ship Chong Chon Gang, in which Cuba was transporting war material hidden in 250,000 bags of brown sugar, but which was detained in Panamanian waters. The North Korean crew members were detained and later released and deported, in addition to receiving a fine from the Panama Canal Authority and retention of war material.

In 2015 he was imprisoned for allegedly committing crimes against the public administration, but in the end his case in 2016 was annulled due to procedural errors.

Mulino has been involved in party politics and was the founder of the Solidarity Party, serving first as vice president and then president. He later served as the Second Vice President of the Patriotic Union. He joined Martinelli's Democratic Change in 2011 until he left the party in 2019, three years later he joined Martinelli's new founded party Realizing Goals.

=== Presidential and vice-presidential runs ===
On 28 May 2018, he ran as a presidential candidate for Democratic Change (CD), with the purpose of regaining control of the party for former leader Martinelli, who had friction with Rómulo Roux, the new president of CD. However, he lost the primaries to Roux, with whom he then, after several months of refusal, allied to support his candidacy in the 2019 elections. Mulino argued that his alliance sought to return the growth, prosperity and jobs that CD had achieved during the Martinelli government, whom he also supported on his return to the country; however, Roux finished in a second place losing narrowly to Laurentino Cortizo.

==== 2024 run ====
Mulino was Martinelli's vice-presidential candidate in the 2024 elections; Martinelli, however, was disqualified from running after being sentenced to almost eleven years in prison for money laundering. As a result, Martinelli who led all polls in the follow-up to the election endorsed Mulino and Realizing Goals nominated him. After the endorsement 26% of those surveyed said they would vote for Mulino in the elections, 16 points more than his immediate followers, according to the survey by the company Mercado Planificado, published by the newspaper La Prensa. After Martinelli's disqualification, the Electoral Tribunal decided that the ballot for the Realizing Goals should list Mulino as "presidential candidate without a vice president."

Mulino won the election with 34.2% of the vote. He defeated a total of seven other candidates, among whom his closest rival was Ricardo Lombana of MOCA, who received around 24.6%. With a turnout of 77%, the election had the highest turnout since the end of military rule and the restoration of a democratic government in 1989.

== Presidency (2024–present) ==
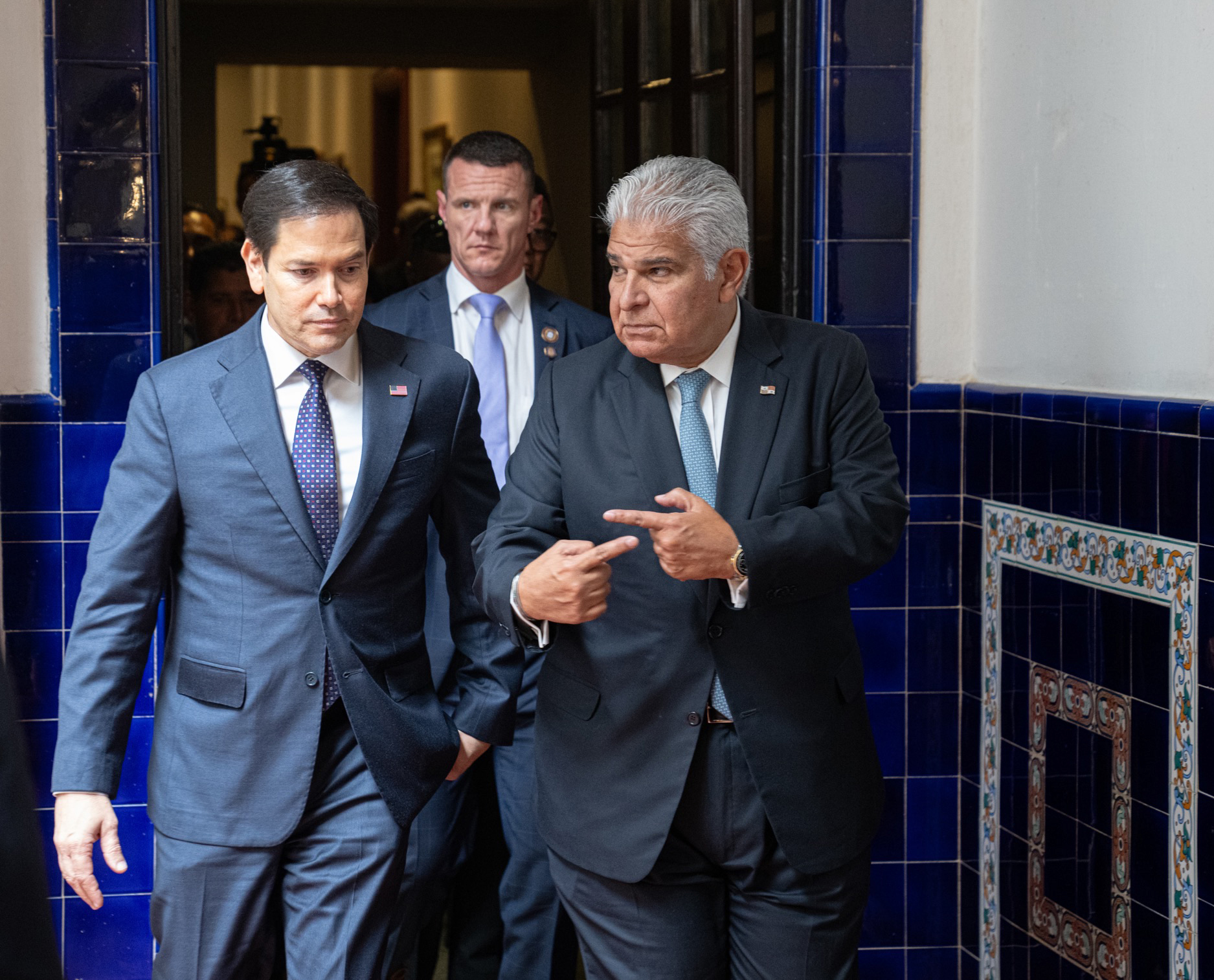
Mulino with U.S. Secretary of State Marco Rubio in Panama City on 2 February 2025

Mulino was sworn in as president on 1 July 2024. During his inauguration speech, he promised the end of irregular migration through the Darién Gap. He also criticised the outgoing president Laurentino Cortizo for Panama's lagging economy and high public debt.

Mulino has called the Panama Papers, which documented money laundering, corruption and tax evasion, "an international hoax to undermine the image and competitiveness of our country." He applauded a Panamanian court verdict that cleared 26 defendants in a corruption investigation related to the Panama Papers.

In December 2024, US President-elect Donald Trump criticized Panama Canal passage rates as being too expensive, warned against potential Chinese control of or influence over the canal, and raised the possibility of a US demand for the full and immediate return of control over the canal to the United States. President Mulino immediately rejected each point of this criticism and pre-emptively refused to return the canal. Trump and Mulino had a phone call scheduled for 7 February 2025, but the call was postponed by Trump to an unknown date "due to last-minute changes in the U.S. leader's agenda," according to U.S presidency.

Mulino, Trump and other leaders at the Shield of the Americas summit in March 2026

On 2 January 2026, President Mulino declared the crisis with the United States to be over, stating that "Panama moved toward a relationship of respect, restored trust, joint work, and friendship, and the canal remained Panamanian."

== Honours ==
=== National ===
- Panama:
  - Grand Cross of the Order of Vasco Núñez de Balboa
  - Grand Cross of the Order of Manuel Amador Guerrero

=== Foreign ===
- Argentina:
  - Grand Cross of the Order of the Liberator General San Martín
- Colombia:
  - Grand Cross of the Order of Boyacá
- Costa Rica:
  - Grand Cross with Golden Plaque of the National Order of Juan Mora Fernández
- Greece:
  - Grand Cross of the Order of the Redeemer - 2 June 2026
- Peru:
  - Grand Collar of the Order of the Sun of Peru - 11 April 2025

== Election results ==
=== 2024 Presidential election ===
Candidate	Party or alliance		Votes	%
José Raúl Mulino	Realizing Goals–Alliance	Realizing Goals	668,527	29.39
José Raúl Mulino	Realizing Goals–Alliance	Alliance Party	110,245	4.85
José Raúl Mulino	Realizing Goals–Alliance	Total	778,772	34.23
Ricardo Lombana	Another Way Movement		559,432	24.59
Martín Torrijos	People's Party		364,576	16.03
Rómulo Roux	For a Better Panama	Democratic Change	138,274	6.08
Rómulo Roux	For a Better Panama	Panameñista Party	120,544	5.30
Rómulo Roux	For a Better Panama	Total	258,818	11.38
Zulay Rodríguez	Independent		150,338	6.61
José Gabriel Carrizo	Vamos con todo Panamá	Democratic Revolutionary Party	126,454	5.56
José Gabriel Carrizo	Vamos con todo Panamá	Nationalist Republican Liberal Movement	7,337	0.32
José Gabriel Carrizo	Vamos con todo Panamá	Total	133,791	5.88
Maribel Gordón	Independent		24,531	1.08
Melitón Arrocha	Independent	Independent Social Alternative Party	2,442	0.11
Melitón Arrocha	Independent	Independent	2,218	0.10
Melitón Arrocha	Independent	Total	4,660	0.20
Total			2,274,918	100.00
Valid votes			2,274,918	97.53
Invalid votes			38,544	1.65
Blank votes			19,101	0.82
Total votes			2,332,563	100.00
Registered voters/turnout			3,004,083	77.65
Source: Tribunal Electoral

== See also ==
- List of current heads of state and government
- List of heads of the executive by approval rating

== Notes ==
Political offices
Preceded by Laurentino Cortizo	President of Panama; 2024–present	Incumbent
