= Shirley Castañedas =

Panamanian politician (born 1973)

Shirley de la Rosa Castañedas Valentín (born 6 June 1973) is a Panamanian politician who has served as the president of the country's National Assembly since 1 July 2026.

== Early life and education ==
Castañedas was born on 6 June 1973 and attended primary school at Centro Educativo Carlos A. Mendoza in San Miguelito and graduated from the Instituto Comercial secondary school in 1991. She has a degree in Law and Political Science from the Latin University of Panama and has been a member of the National Bar Association since 2005. She specialised in criminal law.

== Political career ==
Castañedas is a founding member of the Realizing Goals party, and is close to former President Ricardo Martinelli, including serving as his attorney. She was elected representative for the 13-1 Arraiján District in May 2024 and has served as president of the Credentials, Regulations, Parliamentary Ethics, and Judicial Affairs Committee.

Castañedas was nominated as candidate for President of the Assembly by Realizando Metas in 2025 after a Zoom meeting with Martinelli in exile in Colombia. The decision was formalised through a circular signed by Alaín Cedeño on 24 June, 2025. On 27 June, 2025, the party issued a statement denouncing what it described as a systematic campaign of attacks against her, characterising these as "gender-based violence in the political sphere." In the election for President, she received 34 votes but was defeated by Jorge Herrera of the Panameñista Party, who received 37 votes with the support of the Democratic Change and Seguimos and Vamos blocs.

Castañedas was again nominated in 2026, and was elected with 42 votes after receiving the support of the Democratic Revolutionary Party, defeating Herrera.

Castañedas was sworn in for the 2026-2027 parliamentary period on 1 July 2026. In her inaugural address, she said her administration would focus on strengthening participation, promoting high level depart, and supporting development, investment, and job creation initiatives.

In August 2026, Castañedas said the allocated budget of $97 million for the legislature's operations in 2027 was not enough.
