= 2024 Panamanian general election =

- 5 May 2024
- Presidential election
- Turnout: 77.64% (▲4.64pp)
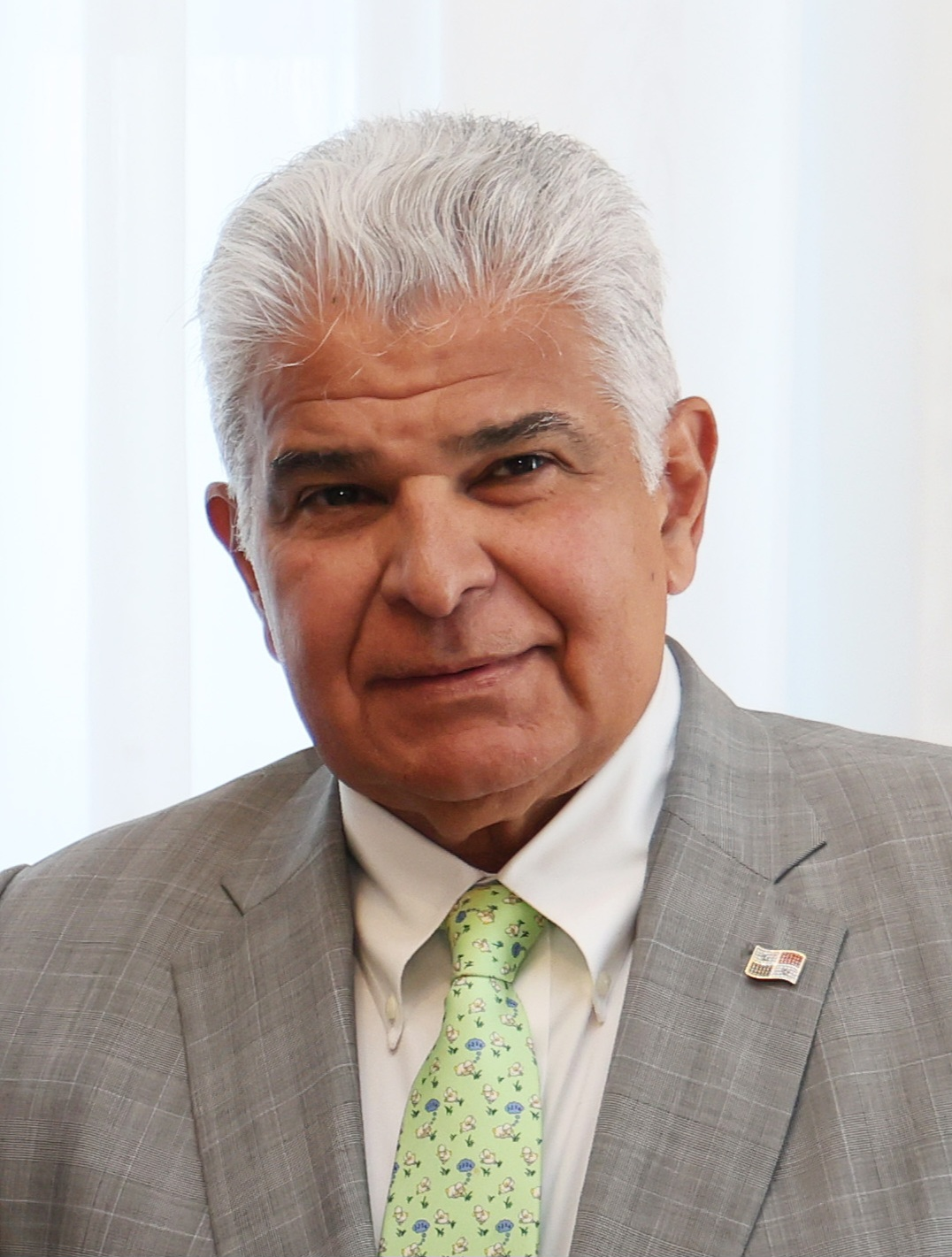

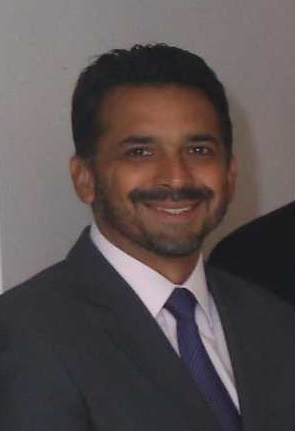

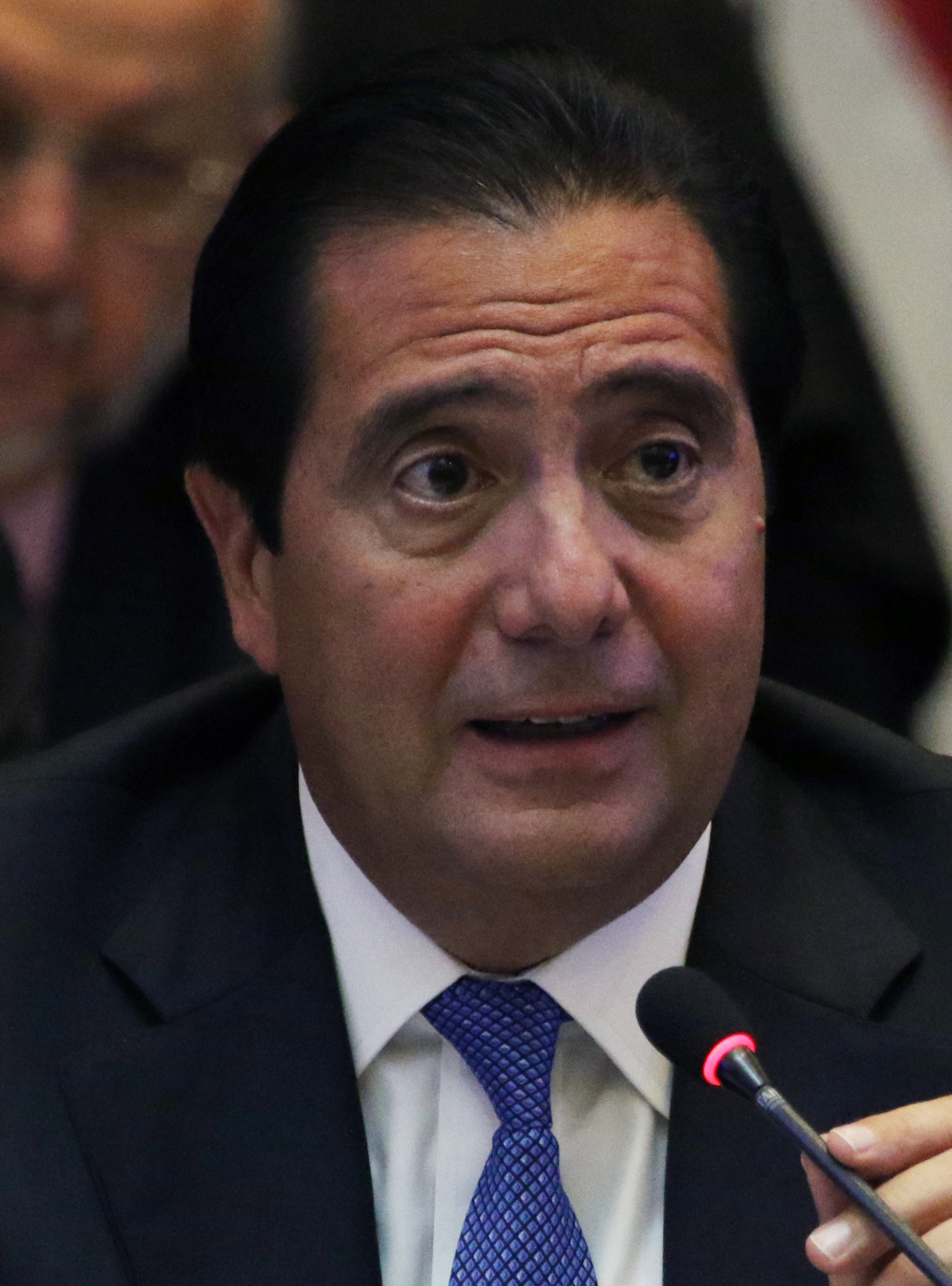

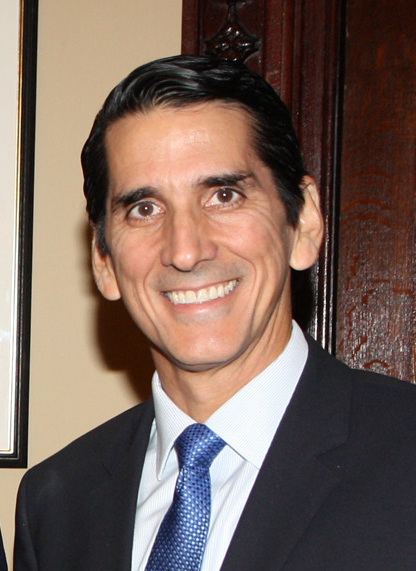

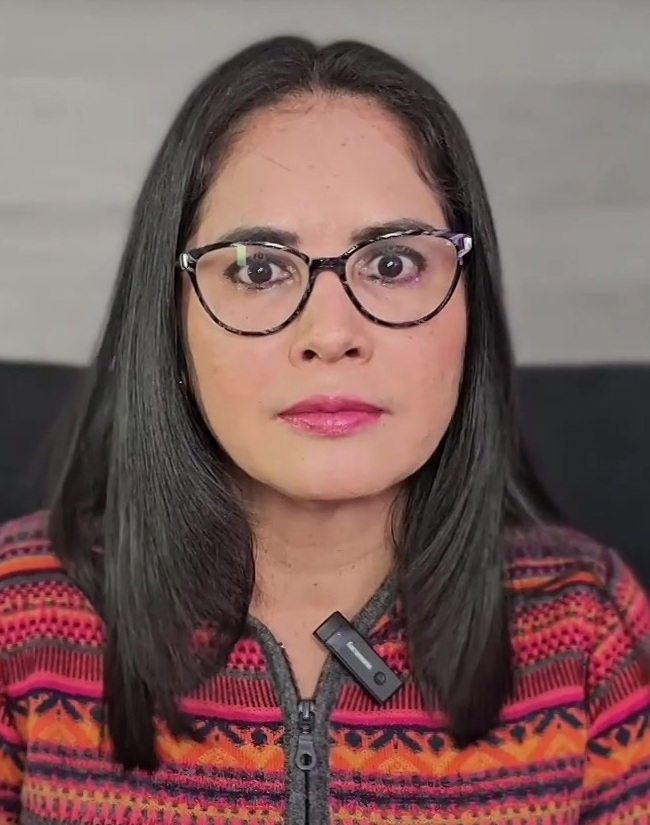

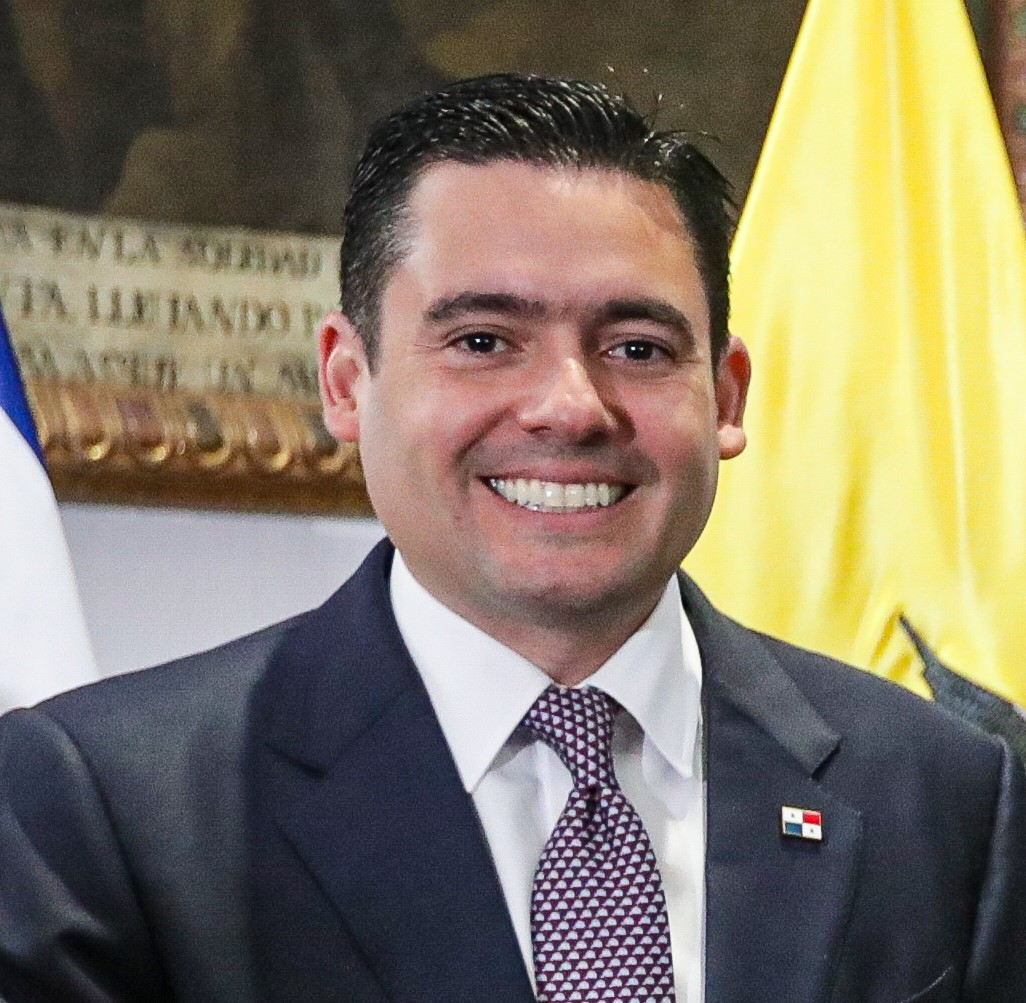
Candidate	José Raúl Mulino	Ricardo Lombana	Martín Torrijos
Party	RM	MOCA	PP
Alliance	RM–Alianza
Running mate	None (Note: Mulino was initially nominated as Ricardo Martinelli's running mate. After Martinelli's disqualification as candidate, Mulino assumes the replacement but without a running mate by electoral disposition.)	Michael Chen	Rosario Turner
Popular vote	778,772	559,432	364,576
Percentage	34.23%	24.59%	16.03%
Candidate	Rómulo Roux	Zulay Rodríguez	José Gabriel Carrizo
Party	CD	Independent	PRD
Alliance	CD–PPa		PRD–MLRN
Running mate	José Blandón	Athenas Athanasiadis	Camilo Alleyne
Popular vote	258,818	150,338	133,791
Percentage	11.38%	6.61%	5.88%
- Results by province
President before election
Laurentino Cortizo
PRD
Elected President
José Raúl Mulino
RM
- Legislative election
- All 71 seats in the National Assembly; 36 seats needed for a majority
- Turnout: 75.75% (▲5.04pp)
Party	Leader	Vote %	Seats	+/–
RM	Ricardo Martinelli	17.17	14	New
PRD	Benicio Robinson	16.25	13	−22
CD	Rómulo Roux	11.19	8	−10
Panameñista	José Blandón	10.64	8	0
MOCA	Ricardo Lombana	6.99	3	New
PP	Daniel Javier Brea	6.01	2	+2
Alianza	José Muñoz	2.91	2	+2
MOLIRENA	Francisco Aleman	3.17	1	−4
Independents	–	24.06	20	+15
This lists parties that won seats. See the complete results below.
Seat distribution by electoral circuit
- Central American Parliament election
- 20 Panamanian seats in the Central American Parliament
Party	Leader	Vote %	Seats	+/–
RM	Ricardo Martinelli	29.39	9	New
PP	Daniel Javier Brea	16.02	5	+4
Zulay Rodríguez list	Zulay Rodríguez	6.60	2	New
PRD	Benicio Robinson	5.56	1	−6
Panameñista	José Blandón	5.29	1	−1
Alianza	José Muñoz	4.84	1	0
MOLIRENA	Francisco Aleman	0.32	1	0
This lists parties that won seats. See the complete results below.

General elections were held in Panama on 5 May 2024 to elect a new president, members of the National Assembly and local governments. Due to constitutional term limits, incumbent president Laurentino Cortizo was ineligible for a second consecutive term. The winners of the general election, including the new president of Panama, were inaugurated on 1 July.

The conservative candidate José Raúl Mulino, who was appointed as presidential candidate of Realizing Goals following the conviction and subsequent disqualification of former president Ricardo Martinelli, won the election with 34.2% of the vote. Mulino defeated a total of seven other candidates, among whom his closest rival was Ricardo Lombana of MOCA, who received around 24.6%.

The governing Democratic Revolutionary Party suffered its worst ever electoral result, despite being the largest political party in Panama. Its candidate, incumbent vice president José Gabriel Carrizo, came in sixth place with 5.88% of the vote; and the party suffered significant losses in the legislative and local elections, losing the mayorships of the most populated districts of the country, including Panamá District, San Miguelito, Colón, Arraiján, La Chorrera, David, and Santiago de Veraguas.

In contrast, there was an outstanding performance by new parties and independent politicians. Realizing Goals, the party of the president-elect, which was founded in 2021 by former president Ricardo Martinelli, gained 14 seats in the National Assembly. Another Way Movement, founded in late 2019 by Ricardo Lombana, became the most-voted opposition party by gaining a fourth of the presidential vote, three members of the National Assembly and numerous local governments, including the mayorship of Santiago. Neither the Democratic Revolutionary Party or the Panameñista Party, the traditional biggest two parties of Panama, were in either of the top two coalitions.

== Electoral system ==
Of the 71 members of the National Assembly, 26 are elected in single-member constituencies and 45 by proportional representation in multi-member constituencies. Each district with more than 40,000 inhabitants forms a constituency. Constituencies elect one MP for every 30,000 residents and an additional representative for every fraction over 10,000. Around three million people were eligible to vote in the election.

In single-member constituencies MPs are elected using the first-past-the-post system. In multi-member constituencies MPs are elected using party list proportional representation according to a double quotient; the first allocation of seats uses a simple quotient, further seats are allotted using the quotient divided by two, with any remaining seats are awarded to the parties with the greatest remainder.

The president is elected by plurality vote in a single round.

== Presidential candidates ==
=== Declared ===
- Rómulo Roux, former minister.
- José Gabriel Carrizo, current vice-president of Panama and member of Democratic Revolutionary Party.
- Ricardo Lombana, former presidential candidate and leader of Movimiento Otro Camino.
- Martín Torrijos, former president of Panama.
- Maribel Gordón, former vice-presidential candidate.
- Zulay Rodríguez, a deputy and the First Vice President of the National Assembly.
- José Raúl Mulino, former minister.
- Melitón Arrocha, diplomat and former minister.
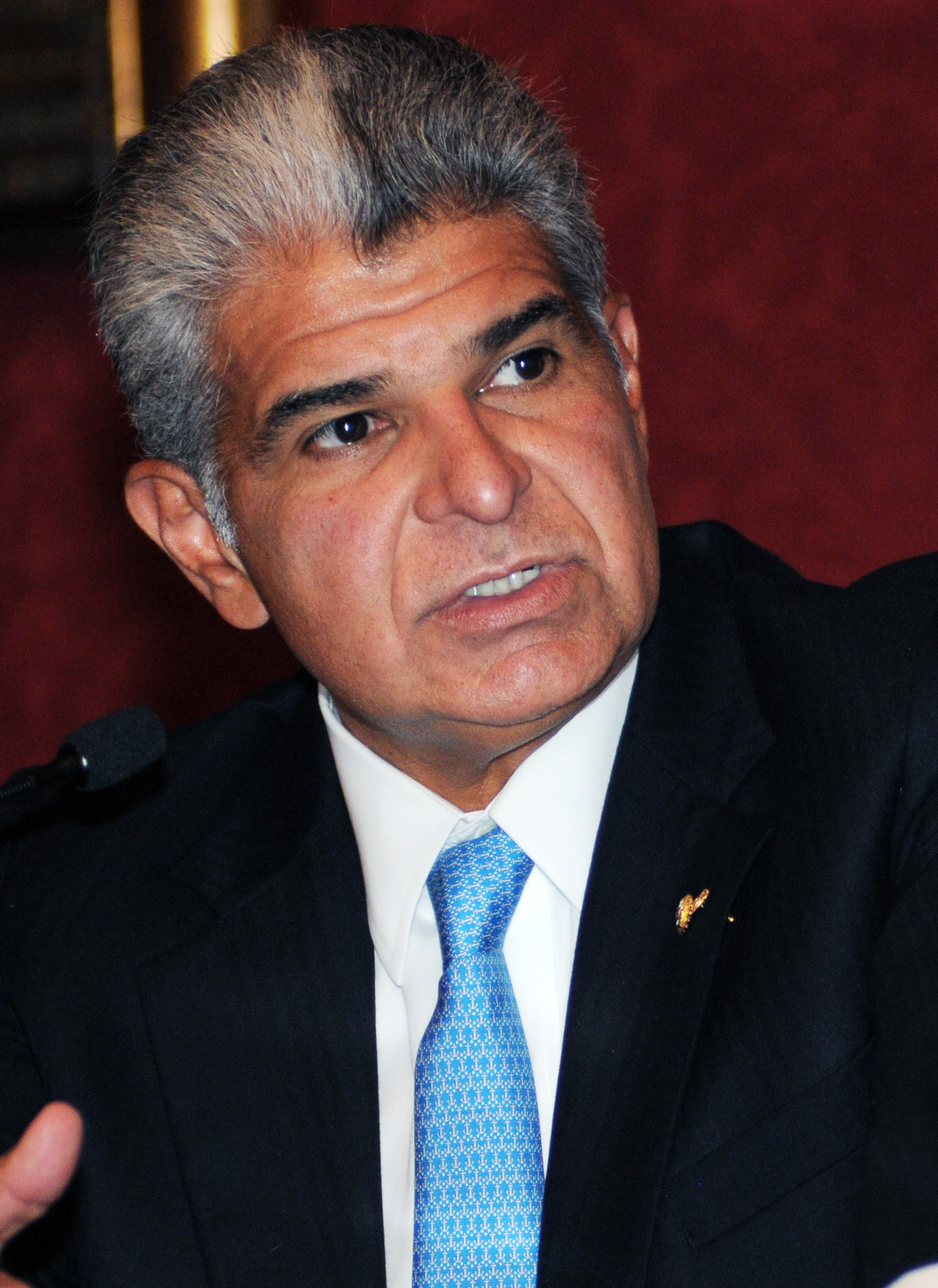
José Raúl Mulino

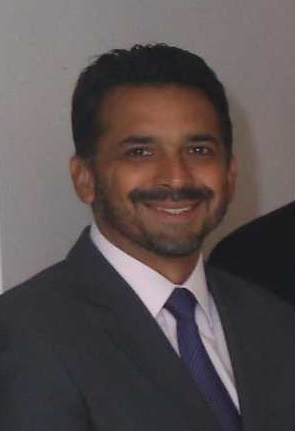
Ricardo Lombana

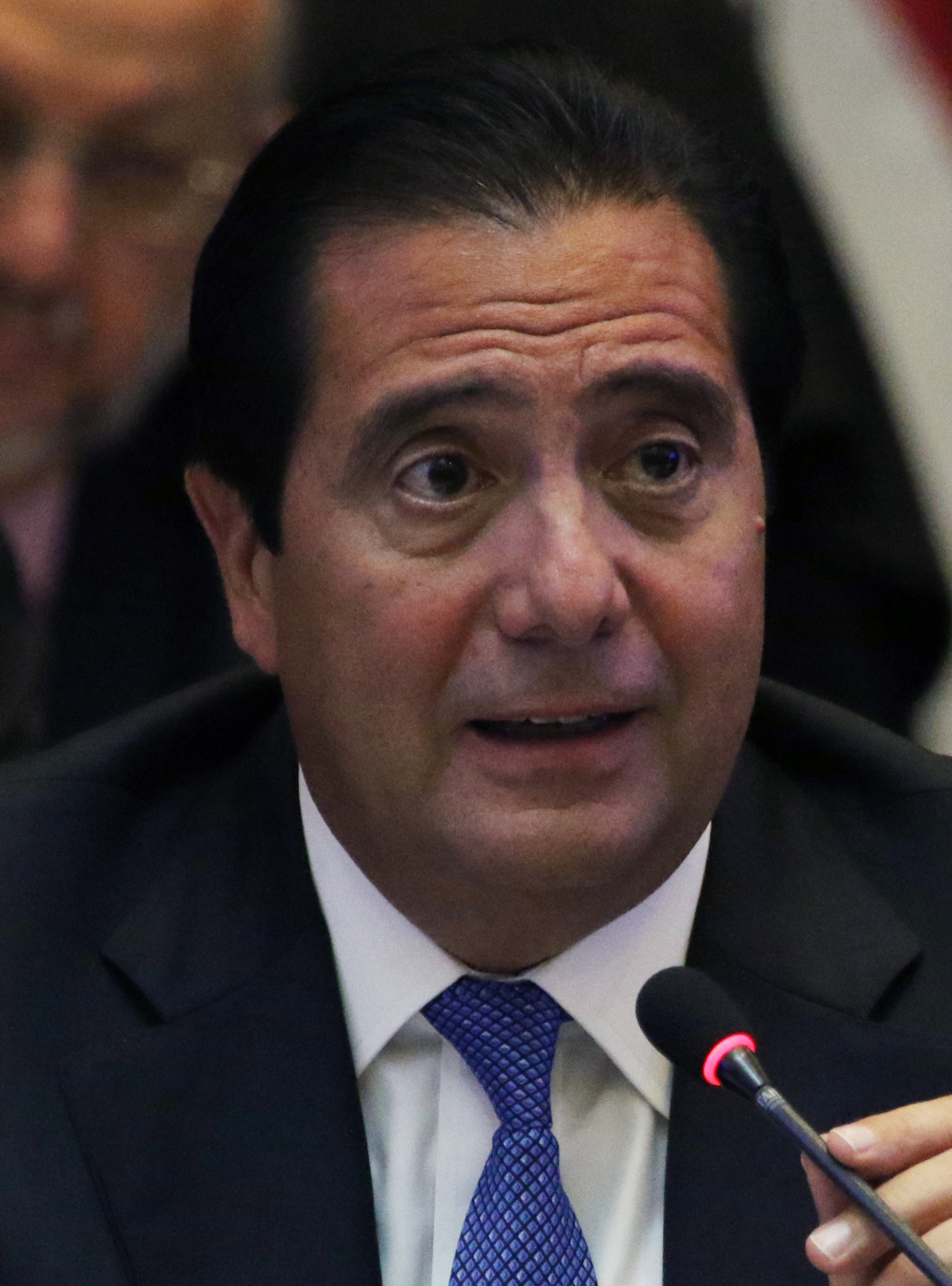
Martín Torrijos

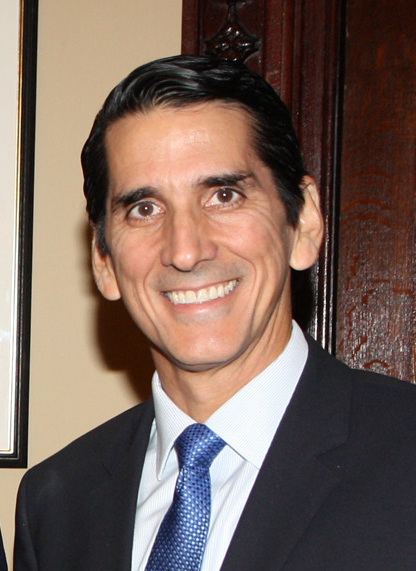
Rómulo Roux

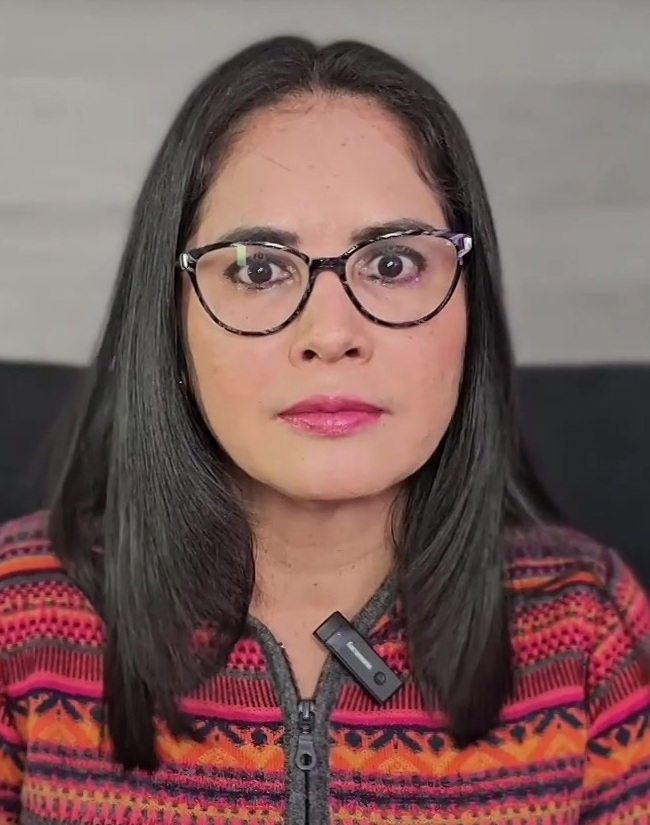
Zulay Rodríguez

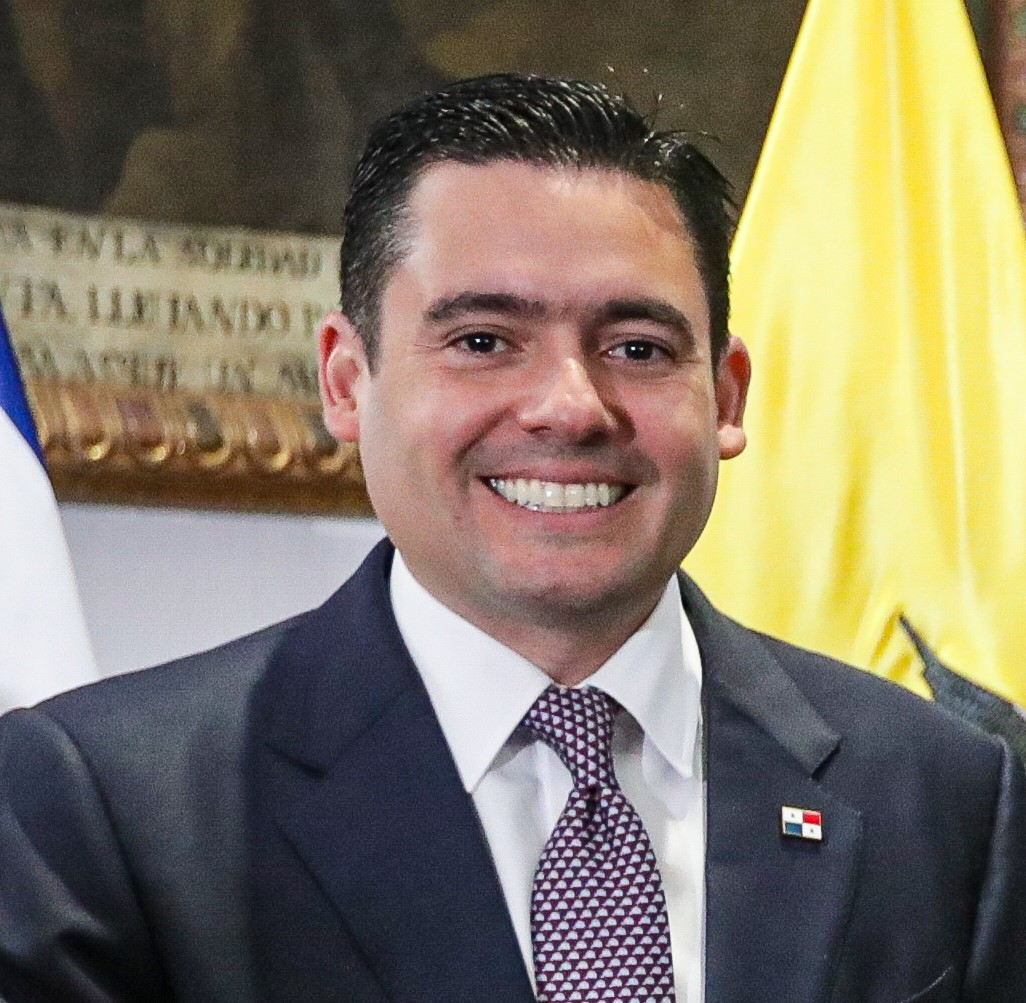
José Gabriel Carrizo

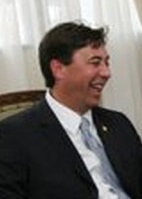
Melitón Arrocha

=== Candidate selection ===
==== Independent candidates ====
In order to get on the ballot, independents had to gather and submit an amount of signatures that exceeded 2% of the vote in the previous election for the position they were seeking, with a maximum of three independent nominations per position. The three independent presidential nominations were won by Zulay Rodríguez, a two-term Assembly member for the Democratic Revolutionary Party, Maribel Gordón, an economist and 2019 vice-presidential candidate of the now-defunct Broad Front for Democracy, and Melitón Arrocha, a former Commerce Minister and member of the Assembly for the Panameñista Party.

==== Realizing Goals ====
Candidate	Votes	%
Ricardo Martinelli	57,355	96.96
Rubén Darío Campos	1,347	2.28
Francisco Ameglio	300	0.51
David Ochy	154	0.26
Total	59,156	100.00
Valid votes	59,156	97.60
Invalid votes	1,039	1.71
Blank votes	414	0.68
Total votes	60,609	100.00
Registered voters/turnout	234,700	25.82
Source: Tribunal Electoral

The presidential primary of the Realizing Goals party, a new party founded by former president Ricardo Martinelli due to disagreements with the president of Democratic Change (also originally founded by Martinelli), Rómulo Roux, was held on 4 June 2023. Martinelli won the nomination with over 96% of the primary vote. He attempted to select his wife, Marta Linares de Martinelli, as his running mate, but the legality of this selection was questioned and resulted in Linares declining the vice-presidential nomination. José Raúl Mulino was subsequently selected as RM's official vice-presidential candidate. The party also celebrated an alliance with the Alliance Party.

==== Democratic Revolutionary Party ====
Candidate	Votes	%
José Gabriel Carrizo	198,208	53.52
Crispiano Adames	107,215	28.95
Pedro Miguel González	34,174	9.23
Calixto Silgado	9,713	2.62
Juan Felipe Pitti	9,258	2.50
Leonel Alexis Rodriguez	4,732	1.28
Franklin Arosemena	3,836	1.04
Eduardo Ríos	3,188	0.86
Total	370,324	100.00
Valid votes	370,324	83.90
Invalid votes	23,193	5.25
Blank votes	47,860	10.84
Total votes	441,377	100.00
Registered voters/turnout	731,267	60.36
Source: Tribunal Electoral

The ruling Democratic Revolutionary Party held its primary election on 11 June 2023. Incumbent Vice-President José Gabriel Carrizo won with 53.5% of the vote against Assembly member Crispiano Adames, who won 29% of the primary vote. He selected Camilo Alleyne, a former health minister, as his running mate. The Nationalist Republican Liberal Movement maintained its alliance with the PRD.

==== Democratic Change ====
Candidate	Votes	%
Rómulo Roux	77,735	52.63
Yanibel Ábrego	68,265	46.22
Olmido Guillén	961	0.65
Luis Antonio Daniel De León	736	0.50
Total	147,697	100.00
Valid votes	147,697	96.05
Invalid votes	3,686	2.40
Blank votes	2,387	1.55
Total votes	153,770	100.00
Registered voters/turnout	306,549	50.16
Source: Tribunal Electoral

The Democratic Change primary was held on 9 July 2023. Rómulo Roux, the party's 2019 presidential candidate and former canal and foreign minister, won the primary with 52.6% of the vote over Yanibel Ábrego, who attracted 46.2% of the vote. Ábrego, an Assembly member, ran promising to celebrate an electoral alliance with Martinelli and Realizing Goals.

==== Panameñista Party ====
Candidate	Votes	%
José Isabel Blandón	101,752	100.00
Total	101,752	100.00
Valid votes	101,752	87.26
Invalid votes	1,873	1.61
Blank votes	12,979	11.13
Total votes	116,604	100.00
Registered voters/turnout	253,308	46.03
Source: Tribunal Electoral

José Isabel Blandón won the Panameñista Party primary unopposed. The party later formed an electoral alliance with Democratic Change. As such, Rómulo Roux became the party's presidential candidate, while Blandón became the vice-presidential candidate.

==== People's Party ====
The People's Party initially considered forming an alliance with Democratic Change and the Panameñista Party, but this proposal fell through. The party opted to nominate former president Martín Torrijos instead. Rosario Turner, a former health minister, was chosen as his running mate.

==== Another Way Movement ====
The Another Way Movement is a new political party founded by Ricardo Lombana, who came third in the 2019 Panamanian presidential election. It nominated Lombana for the presidency through a national congress, as the party has less than the 100,000 adherents that would require a primary. He selected Michael Chen as his running mate.

==== Independent Social Alternative Party ====
The new Independent Social Alternative Party (PAIS) initially selected José Alberto Álvarez as its candidate via a party congress on 29 July 2023. The party later backed the independent candidacy of Melitón Arrocha. The party declared it was not aware of Arrocha's April 29 decision to endorse Martín Torrijos, with party president Álvarez referring to it as an "unpleasant surprise." The party unlinked itself from Arrocha's decision. As Arrocha did not formally decline his candidacy, he remained on the ballot as both an independent candidate and PAIS's presidential candidate.

=== Disqualification of Ricardo Martinelli ===
In 2021, former president Ricardo Martinelli announced that he would run again for president as leader of Realizing Goals. On 18 July 2023, however, a criminal court sentenced him to more than 10 years' imprisonment for money laundering, relating to the "New Business" case involving the granting of lucrative government contracts to businesses that later transferred money to a front set up by Martinelli. His conviction was upheld by the Supreme Court on 2 February 2024, making him ineligible to run again for president in elections that he wanted to contest later in the year. On 4 March his candidacy was formally revoked by the Electoral Tribunal, which declared his running-mate, former foreign minister José Raúl Mulino, as the replacement presidential candidate in his place without a vice-president. On 3 May, the Supreme Court voted 8–1 to dismiss a legal challenge against Mulino's candidacy on the grounds that he was not selected as candidate in a party primary and lacked a vice-presidential candidate, arguing that to do so would be a greater harm to Realizing Goals and the Alliance Party, which would have been left without a presidential candidate.

Since his conviction in February 2024, Martinelli has insisted that he would continue his presidential campaign, but has since sought asylum at the Nicaraguan embassy in Panama City. He has posted video messages supporting Mulino throughout the campaign.

== Campaign ==
The election was held against a backdrop of voter discontent. One poll found an 86% disapproval rating for the incumbent president, Nito Cortizo, and that 9 out of 10 of Panamanians thought the country was on the wrong path. Another found two out of three citizens wanted "radical change". The same poll found were 83% are dissatisfied with their democracy.

Among significant issues during the campaign were corruption, the economy, the environment and constitutional reform, with Rómulo Roux and Ricardo Lombana pledging to revise or replace the current constitution enacted in 1972. Specifically, Lombana wants the presidential election to be decided by a run-off. Martín Torrijos pledged to jumpstart the economy by investing in the Panama Canal, while Roux pledged to implement an "aggressive" job creation scheme and improve public services.

The closure of the Cobre Panamá copper mine in 2023 following protests was also a significant issue, with all candidates supporting the Supreme Court's decision to annul a 20-year contract awarded to First Quantum Minerals as unconstitutional. However, Roux, Lombana and Maribel Gordón supported the total closure and conversion (reclamation) of the mine site.

On the topic of corruption, Lombana pledged to fight the influence of drug money in Panamanian politics. According to Gallup, 57% of Panamanians believed corruption is the most important issue ahead of the election.

José Raúl Mulino pledged to close the Darién Gap as a route for migrants heading to the United States and repatriate migrants already in Panama, while promising to respect their rights. He also pledged to provide help to Ricardo Martinelli once he was in office. Lombana opposed closing the Darién Gap and instead proposed to improve security conditions for migrants transiting the country.

Over the course of the campaign, Zulay Rodríguez attempted to resign her seat in the Assembly, without success.

On 30 April, presidential candidate Melitón Arrocha announced that he was supporting former president Martín Torrijos, but did not formally withdraw his candidacy.

== Opinion polls ==

Pollster	Date	Sample size	Mulino (RM)	Martinelli (RM)	Lombana (MOC)	Carrizo (PRD)	Roux (CD)	Blandón (PAN)	Torrijos (PP)	Other	Blank
Election Results	2 May 2024	2,274,918	34.2%	—N/a	24.6%	5.9%	11.4%		16.0%	7.9%	—N/a
Gallup Panama	23–27 April 2024	1,200	33.4%	—N/a	17.4%	7.7%	13.3%		17.4%	10.6%	—N/a
Statista Research Department	14–20 March 2024	–	35%	—N/a	12%	—N/a	14%		15%	19%	5.8%
Mercadeo Planificado	3–5 February 2024	–	26%	—N/a	10.8%	6.5%	10.2%		10.8%	—N/a	5.8%
2 February 2024		Ricardo Martinelli is disqualified by the Supreme Court His running mate José Raúl Mulino becomes Presidential Candidate									
Acción Ciudadana	27 January–3 February 2024	1,200	40%		11%	4%	8%		9%	—N/a	3%
C&E Research	10–15 January 2024	800	30%		12%	10%	14%		22%	—N/a	3%
26 September 2023		José Isabel Blandón ends his presidential candidacy Becomes the running mate of Rómulo Roux									
Gismo Services S.A.	19–23 August 2023	1,800	29%		5%	28%	13%	10%	7%	—N/a	3%
Gallup Panama	2–10 August 2023	1,200	55%		8%	3%	9%	5%	11%	5%	13%
Gallup Panama	17–22 June 2023	1,200	66%		5%	6%	8%	2%	9%	4%	14%
C&E Research	17 May 2023	800	36%		9%	12%	16%	8%	19%	—N/a	—N/a
C&E Research	11 April 2023	800	44%		10%	3%	8%	5%	18%	—N/a	12%
Gallup Panama	13–21 March 2023	1,200	62%		12%	1%	7%	4%	9%	5%	24%
Gismo Services	22–23 February 2023	1,800	33%		6%	29%	13%	9%	—N/a	10%	6%
Gallup Panama	9–16 February 2023	1,200	62%		16%	5%	11%	5%	—N/a	26%	
Gismo Services	17–23 January 2023	1,800	30%		7%	27%	11%	9%	—N/a	10%	6%
Gismo Services	6–10 December 2022	1,800	32%		9%	28%	12%	9%	—N/a	10%	6%
Gismo Services	3–7 September 2022	1,800	35%		6%	27%	13%	7%	—N/a	—N/a	12%
Gismo Services	27–31 July 2022	1,800	34.1%		3.4%	26.1%	13.6%	6.8%	—N/a	—N/a	12%
Gismo Services	7–11 May 2022	1,800	35.3%		4.7%	27.1%	15.3%	8.2%	—N/a	—N/a	15%
Gismo Services	6–10 April 2022	1,800	37.1%		3.4%	25.8%	14.6%	9%	—N/a	—N/a	11%
Gallup Panama	11–16 March 2022	1,200	56.6%		13.3%	7.2%	2.4%	6%	—N/a	14.4%	17%
Gismo Services	5–10 March 2022	1,800	39.8%		5.7%	23.9%	11.4%	8%	—N/a	—N/a	12%
Gallup Panama	5–9 February 2022	1,200	57.7%		12.8%	5.1%	4.1%	5.1%	—N/a	8%	22%
Gismo Services	3–7 January 2022	1,800	44.9%		5.6%	22.5%	7.9%	5.6%	—N/a	—N/a	11%
Gismo Services	December 2021	1,800	45%		5%	19%	8%	4%	—N/a	10%	9%

== Conduct ==
Polling opened at 07:00 on 5 May and closed at 16:00 Eastern Standard Time. There were no reported incidents, and voting went smoothly. However, inconsistencies in vote counting were reported in Bocas del Toro, Panamá Province, Penonomé, and Veraguas.

== Results ==
With a turnout of 77%, the election had the highest turnout since the end of military rule and the restoration of a democratic government in 1989.

=== Presidential election ===
Candidate	Party or alliance		Votes	%
José Raúl Mulino	Realizing Goals–Alliance	Realizing Goals	668,527	29.39
José Raúl Mulino	Realizing Goals–Alliance	Alliance Party	110,245	4.85
José Raúl Mulino	Realizing Goals–Alliance	Total	778,772	34.23
Ricardo Lombana	Another Way Movement		559,432	24.59
Martín Torrijos	People's Party		364,576	16.03
Rómulo Roux	For a Better Panama	Democratic Change	138,274	6.08
Rómulo Roux	For a Better Panama	Panameñista Party	120,544	5.30
Rómulo Roux	For a Better Panama	Total	258,818	11.38
Zulay Rodríguez	Independent		150,338	6.61
José Gabriel Carrizo	Vamos con todo Panamá	Democratic Revolutionary Party	126,454	5.56
José Gabriel Carrizo	Vamos con todo Panamá	Nationalist Republican Liberal Movement	7,337	0.32
José Gabriel Carrizo	Vamos con todo Panamá	Total	133,791	5.88
Maribel Gordón	Independent		24,531	1.08
Melitón Arrocha	Independent	Independent Social Alternative Party	2,442	0.11
Melitón Arrocha	Independent	Independent	2,218	0.10
Melitón Arrocha	Independent	Total	4,660	0.20
Total			2,274,918	100.00
Valid votes			2,274,918	97.53
Invalid votes			38,544	1.65
Blank votes			19,101	0.82
Total votes			2,332,563	100.00
Registered voters/turnout			3,004,083	77.65
Source: Tribunal Electoral

All the parties received the 2% of the vote that is the minimum necessary to avoid dissolution in the presidential race, except the MOLIRENA and PAIS. MOLIRENA avoided dissolution by receiving 3% of the vote for deputy, but PAIS did not receive 2% in any election and so was dissolved.

=== Election of PARLACEN Deputies ===
Also elected were Panama's deputies to the Central American Parliament. These were elected based on the presidential vote and distributed proportionally. MOCA and Democratic Change did not nominate any candidates. The following candidates were elected:

1. Carlos Outten (RM-Primary)/Ricardo Alberto Martinelli Linares (Alternate)
2. Giselle Burillo (RM-Primary)/Luis Enrique Martinelli Linares (Alternate)
3. José Ramos (RM-Primary)/Alma Lorena Cortés (Alternate)
4. Dorindo Cortez (RM-Primary)/David Ochy (Alternate)
5. Jaime Ford (RM-Primary)/Bayardo Martínez (Alternate)
6. Alma Rodríguez (RM-Primary)/David Reyes (Alternate)
7. Augusto Batista (RM-Primary)/César Zapata Muñoz (Alternate)
8. Virgilio Moreno (RM-Primary)/Héctor Santos Rudas (Alternate)
9. Rodrigo Farrugia (RM-Primary)/Mercedes González (Alternate)
10. Cirilo Salas (PP-Primary)/Bernardino González (Alternate)
11. Lesly Ariel Miranda (PP-Primary)/Nelson Solís (Alternate)
12. Eric Villarreal (PP-Primary)/Otilia Beker (Alternate)
13. Katiuska Farlanes (PP-Primary)/José Gil (Alternate)
14. Luis Castillo Ruiz (PP-Primary)/Mayra Rivera (Alternate)
15. Rubén Darío Campos (Independent-Primary)/Astrid Austin (Alternate)
16. Querube Henríquez (Independent-Primary)/Felipe Chen (Alternate)
17. Benicio Robinson (PRD-Primary)/Ernestina Morales (Alternate)
18. Juan Carlos Varela (Panameñista-Primary)/Itzi Atencio (Alternate)
19. Jackeline Muñoz (Alliance-Primary)/Honorio Quesada (Alternate)
20. Rachel González (MOLIRENA-Primary)/Mayling González (Alternate)

The outgoing president, Nito Cortizo, and the outgoing vice-president, José Gabriel Carrizo, are also automatically assigned a seat in the PARLACEN, but have not manifested whether they will take those seats.

The election saw several candidates under investigation, such as former president Juan Carlos Varela and the sons of former president Ricardo Alberto Martinelli Berrocal (who were elected as alternates), win. Several voices have spoken in favor of Panama leaving the PARLACEN.

=== Legislative election ===
Party	Votes	%	Seats	+/–
Realizing Goals	367,378	17.17	14	New
Democratic Revolutionary Party	347,692	16.25	13	−22
Democratic Change	239,529	11.19	8	−10
Panameñista Party	227,692	10.64	8	0
Another Way Movement	149,462	6.99	3	New
People's Party	128,504	6.01	2	+2
Nationalist Republican Liberal Movement	67,908	3.17	1	−4
Alliance Party	62,313	2.91	2	+2
Independent Social Alternative Party	34,250	1.60	0	New
Independents	514,900	24.06	20	+15
Total	2,139,628	100.00	71	0
Valid votes	2,139,628	94.49		
Invalid votes	61,340	2.71		
Blank votes	63,404	2.80		
Total votes	2,264,372	100.00		
Registered voters/turnout	2,999,625	75.49		
Source: Tribunal Electoral

The legislative elections produced no majority in the Assembly, necessitating the formation of coalitions in order to control the body. Ultimately, RM forged an alliance with the PRD, CD, the Alliance Party, MOLIRENA, 6 Panameñista deputies, and 1 People's Party deputy to control the Assembly with 44 votes and elected Dana Castañeda President of the National Assembly.

Political independents performed notably well in the election, winning 20 seats for a net gain of 15. Nineteen of these are affiliated with the Coalición Vamos, a political organization dedicated to helping political independents be elected to positions across the country, led by Juan Diego Vásquez and Gabriel Silva and which was endorsed by musician and former tourism minister, Rubén Blades. Eduardo Gaitán, who was elected in the multi-member constituency based in San Miguelito, received the most votes of any candidate for the Assembly in the country. Neftalí Zamora, also affiliated with Vamos, became the youngest member-elect of the Assembly. After the election, Betserai Richards, the sole independent not elected as part of Vamos, announced he would join Vamos's legislative grouping. The members of this group all renounced several privileges given to Assembly members, as did MOCA member-elect José Pérez Barboni.

The election also saw an extremely low rate of reelection among members who sought to retain their seats, as well as a large amount of young candidates who were elected to the Assembly and several major mayoralties.

==== Single-member circuits ====
Electoral circuit		Incumbent member		Electoral results	
No.	Composition	Incumbent member		Status	Candidates
2-2	Coclé Province: Antón District	Melchor Herrera	PRD	Incumbent member lost re-election. New member elected. Seat gained by CD.	✓ Orlando Carrasquilla (CD) 34.00%; Melchor Herrera (PRD) 17.35%; Ricardo Solís (PAN) 15.45%
2–3	Coclé Province: La Pintada District; Natá District; Olá District	Luis Ernesto Carles	PAN	Incumbent member lost re-election. New member elected. Seat gained by RM.	✓ Dana Castañeda (RM) 42.18%; Juan Peralta (LP) 17.72%; Luis Ernesto Carles (PAN) 16.34%
2–4	Coclé Province: Aguadulce District	Bernardino González	PAN	Incumbent member retired. New member elected. No partisan change.	✓ Jorge Herrera (PAN) 31.11%; John De León (MOLIRENA) 20.21%; Omar Cornejo (RM) 16.36%
3-2	Colón Province: Chagres District; Donoso District; Portobelo District; Santa Isabel District; Omar Torrijos Herrera District	Nelson Jackson	PRD	Incumbent member re-elected.	✓ Nelson Jackson (PRD) 38.30%; Yinela Ábrego (CD) 36.42%; Jamil Solís (LP2) 10.95%
4-2	Chiriquí Province: Barú District	Everardo Concepción	PAN	Incumbent member lost re-election. New member elected. Seat gained by ALZ.	✓ Osman Gómez (ALZ) 25.24%; Sammy Bardayan Jr. (PRD) 18.02%; Yesica Valdés (PP) 14.44%
4–4	Chiriquí Province: Alanje District; Boquerón District; Renacimiento District	Gonzalo González	PRD	Incumbent member lost re-election. New member elected. Seat gained by PAN.	✓ Medin Jiménez (PAN) 34.13%; Javier Saldaña (RM) 16.67%; Gonzalo González (PRD) 13.54%
4–5	Chiriquí Province: Boquete District; Dolega District; Gualaca District	Manolo Ruiz	MOLIRENA	Incumbent member lost re-election. New member elected. Seat gained by LP.	✓ Jhonathan Vega (LP) 20.38%; Manolo Ruiz (MOLIRENA) 16.32%; Alfonso Mou (CD) 14.22%
4–6	Chiriquí Province: Remedios District; San Félix District; San Lorenzo District; Tolé District	Ana Giselle Rosas	CD	Incumbent member lost re-election. New member elected. Seat gained by PP.	✓ Eliécer Castrellón (PP) 38.91%; Freddy Bonilla (PRD) 22.36%; Ana Giselle Rosas (CD) 19.85%
5-1	Darién Province and Emberá-Wounaan: Chepigana District; Santa Fe District; Sambú District	Arnulfo Díaz	CD	Incumbent member lost re-election. New member elected. Seat gained by MOLIRENA.	✓ Isaac Mosquera (MOLIRENA) 30.61%; Eduardo Paz (PRD) 23.37%; Pastor Vargas (PP) 14.61%
5–2	Darién Province and Emberá-Wounaan: Pinogana District; Cémaco District	Jaime Vargas	PRD	Incumbent member re-elected.	✓ Jaime Vargas (PRD) 37.60%; Jorge Vargas (RM) 26.92%; Ezequiel Ramírez (PP) 16.12%
6–1	Herrera Province: Chitré District	Alejandro Castillero	PRD	Incumbent member lost renomination. New member elected. Seat gained by CD.	✓ Manuel Cohen (CD) 33.78%; Penélope Nanín (RM) 25.00%; Joselito Villalaz (MOCA) 20.71%
6-2	Herrera Province: Los Pozos District; Parita District; Pesé District	Julio Mendoza	PRD	Incumbent member lost re-election. New member elected. Seat gained by PAN.	✓ José Luis Varela (PAN) 59.36%; Melany Varela (RM) 23.39%; Julio Mendoza (PRD) 13.02%
6-3	Herrera Province: Las Minas District; Ocú District; Santa María District	Marcos Castillero	PRD	Incumbent member re-elected.	✓ Marcos Castillero (PRD) 33.30%; Darío Marín (RM) 31.73%; Juan Torres (PAN) 29.90%
7-1	Los Santos Province: Guararé District; Las Tablas District; Pedasí District; Pocrí District	Eric Broce	PRD	Incumbent member lost re-election. New member elected. Seat gained by CD.	✓ Tito Afú (CD) 44.73%; Severino Vega (ALZ) 14.29%; Beatriz Cano (RM) 12.85%
7-2	Los Santos Province: Los Santos District; Macaracas District; Tonosí District	Olivares De Frías	PRD	Incumbent member lost re-election. New member elected. Seat gained by RM.	✓ Ronald De Gracia (RM) 27.99%; Mariela Vega (CD) 24.69%; Olivares De Frías (PRD) 16.54%
8-1	Panamá Province: Balboa District; Chepo District; Chimán District; Taboga District	Hernán Delgado	CD	Incumbent member retired. New member elected. Seat gained by ALZ.	✓ Jony Guevara (ALZ) 34.80%; Cristhian Brandao (LP2) 16.17%; Carlos Batista (PRD) 15.83%
9-2	Veraguas Province: La Mesa District; Las Palmas District; Soná District	Ariel Alba	PRD	Incumbent member lost re-election. New member elected. Seat gained by RM.	✓ Tomás Benavides (RM) 28.55%; Albis Camarena (CD) 27.68%; Luigi Ábrego (MOLIRENA) 13.43%
9-3	Veraguas Province: Calobre District; Cañazas District; San Francisco District; Santa Fe District	Eugenio Bernal	PRD	Incumbent member lost re-election. New member elected. Seat gained by PAN.	✓ Francisco Brea (PAN) 41.75%; Eugenio Bernal (PRD) 22.13%; José Valencia (PP) 19.35%
9–4	Veraguas Province: Atalaya District; Mariato District; Montijo District; Río de Jesús District	Ricardo Torres	PRD	Incumbent member lost re-election. New member elected. Seat gained by CD.	✓ Didiano Pinilla (CD) 38.46%; Ricardo Torres (PRD) 22.44%; Celestino González (RM) 15.37%
10-1	Guna Yala Comarca: Ailigandí; Madugandí; Narganá	Petita Ayarza	PRD	Incumbent member lost renomination. New member elected. No partisan change.	✓ Flor Brenes (PRD) 30.95%; Luciani Herrera (RM) 26.38%; Fidelio Alfaro (PAN) 20.23%
10-2	Guna Yala Comarca: Ailigandí; Puerto Obaldía; Tubualá; Wargandí	Arquesio Arias	PRD	Incumbent member re-elected.	✓ Arquesio Arias (PRD) 26.76%; Iguaibiliquina Hedman (CD) 25.23%; Rodelick Richards (PP) 24.86%
12–1	Ngäbe-Buglé Comarca: Kankintú District; Kusapín District; Jirondai District; Santa Catalina o Calovébora District	Leopoldo Archibold	CD	Incumbent member lost re-election. New member elected. Seat gained by PAN.	✓ Roberto Archibold (PAN) 37.33%; Sebastián Jiménez (PRD) 34.55%; Leopoldo Archibold (RM) 14.49%
12-2	Ngäbe-Buglé Comarca: Besikó District; Mironó District; Nole Duima District	Adán Bejerano	LP	Incumbent member lost re-election. New member elected. Seat gained by PRD.	✓ Nixon Andrade (PRD) 33.59%; Diego Rodríguez (CD) 24.62%; Felicia Bejerano (PAN) 22.71%
12-3	Ngäbe-Buglé Comarca: Müna District; Ñürüm District	Ricardo Santo	PRD	Incumbent member lost re-election. New member elected. Seat gained by CD.	✓ Gertrudis Rodríguez (CD) 33.79%; Ricardo Santo (PRD) 18.32%; Ramón Mendoza (RM) 12.15%
13-2	Panamá Oeste Province: Capira District	Yanibel Ábrego	CD	Incumbent member retired. New member elected. No partisan change.	✓ Eduardo Vásquez (CD) 45.33%; Jorge Ramos (PRD) 36.89%; Jafeph Betesh (LP2) 8.33%
13-3	Panamá Oeste Province: Chame District; San Carlos District	José Junier Herrera	CD	Incumbent member lost re-election. New member elected. Seat gained by PAN.	✓ Edwin Vergara (PAN) 36.60%; José Herrera (PRD) 33.39%; Joaquín Frías (LP1) 18.55%

==== Multi-member circuits ====
Electoral circuit		Incumbent members	Elected members
No.	Composition	Incumbent members	Elected members
1-1	Bocas del Toro Province and Naso Tjër Di: Naso Tjër Di Comarca; Almirante District; Bocas del Toro District; Changuinola District; Chiriquí Grande District	✗ Abel Beker (PRD); ✓ Benicio Robinson (PRD)	Remainder, 16 933 votes: Yesica Romero (CD); Remainder, 16 873 votes: Benicio Robinson (PRD)
2-1	Coclé Province: Penonomé District	✓ Néstor Guardia (PRD); ✗ Daniel Ramos (PRD)	Remainder, 12 245 votes: Julio De La Guardia (CD); Remainder, 9733 votes: Néstor Guardia (PRD)
3-1	Colón Province: Colón District	Leopoldo Benedetti (CD); Mariano López (PRD); ✓ Jairo Salazar (PRD); ✗ Pedro Torres (PAN)	Half-Quotient, 21 304 votes: Víctor De Jesús (RM); Half-Quotient, 13 495 votes: Yamireliz Chong (LP); Half-Quotient, 13 161 votes: Jairo Salazar (PRD); Remainder, 16 879 votes: Rogelio Revello (RM)
4-1	Chiriquí Province: David District	✗ Fernando Arce (PRD); ✗ Miguel Fanovich (MLRN); ✗ Hugo Méndez (PAN)	Half-Quotient, 20 150 votes: Augusto Palacios (LP); Half-Quotient, 18 750 votes: Carlos Saldaña (LP); Half-Quotient, 11 588 votes: Jamis Acosta (RM)
4-3	Chiriquí Province: Bugaba District; Tierras Altas District	✗ Rony Araúz (PRD); ✗ Juan Esquivel (CD)	Half-Quotient, 13 169 votes: Ricardo Vigil (PAN); Remainder, 9712 votes: Ariana Coba (PAN)
8-2	Panamá Province: San Miguelito District	✗ Francisco Alemán (MLRN); ✗ Leandro Ávila (PRD); ✗ Itzi Atencio (PAN); ✗ Dalia Bernal (CD); ✓ Raúl Pineda (PRD); Juan Diego Vásquez (LP); ✗ Zulay Rodríguez (PRD)	Quotient, 65 948 votes: Eduardo Gaitán (LP); Quotient, 64 165 votes: Luis Duke (LP); Quotient, 63 014 votes: Alexandra Brenes (LP); Quotient, 18 863 votes: Luis Eduardo Camacho (RM); Half-Quotient, 15 419 votes: Raúl Pineda (PRD); Remainder, 61 909 votes: Yarelis Rodríguez (LP); Remainder, 17 705 votes: Luis Omar Ortega (RM)
8-3	Panamá District: Ancón; Bella Vista; Betania; Calidonia; Curundú; El Chorrillo; Pueblo Nuevo; San Felipe; Santa Ana	✓ Crispiano Adames (PRD); ✗ Héctor Brands (PRD); ✗ Corina Cano (MLRN); ✓ Sergio Gálvez (CD); Gabriel Silva (LP)	Quotient, 29 283 votes: Walkiria Chandler (LP); Quotient, 14 443 votes: Crispiano Adames (PRD); Half-Quotient, 13 607 votes: Sergio Gálvez (RM); Half-Quotient, 11 960 votes: José Pérez Barboni (MOCA); Remainder, 28 581 votes: Paulette Thomas (LP)
8-4	Panamá District: Don Bosco; Juan Díaz; Parque Lefevre; Río Abajo; San Francisco	Edison Broce (LP); ✗ Víctor Castillo (PRD); Mayín Correa (CD); ✗ Raúl Fernández (LP); ✓ Javier Sucre (PRD)	Quotient, 39 576 votes: Roberto Zúñiga (LP); Half-Quotient, 14 216 votes: Ernesto Cedeño (MOCA); Half-Quotient, 10 488 votes: Javier Sucre (PRD); Remainder, 39 044 votes: Jorge Bloise (LP); Remainder, 12 459 votes: Grace Hernández (MOCA)
8-5	Panamá District: Alcalde Díaz; Caimitillo; Chilibre; Ernesto Córdoba Campos; Las Cumbres	✗ Génesis Arjona (CD); ✗ Alina González (PRD); ✗ Tito Rodríguez (MLRN)	Quotient, 34 754 votes: Neftalí Zamora (LP); Remainder, 33 681 votes: Jorge Gonzáles (LP); Remainder, 13 827 votes: Ariel Vallarino (RM)
8-6	Panamá District: 24 de Diciembre; Las Garzas; Las Mañanitas; Pacora; Pedregal; San Martín; Tocumen	✓ Alaín Cedeño (CD); ✗ Cenobia Vargas (PRD); ✗ Elías Vigil (PAN); ✗ Edwin Zúñiga (CD)	Half-Quotient, 33 701 votes: Betserai Richards (LP); Half-Quotient, 27 424 votes: Alaín Cedeño (RM); Half-Quotient, 22 346 votes: Manuel Samaniego (LP); Half-Quotient, 14 507 votes: Raphael Buchanan (PRD)
9-1	Veraguas Province: Santiago District	✗ Fátima Agrazal (CD); ✗ Luis Cruz (PRD)	Half-Quotient, 15 457 votes: Janine Prado (LP); Remainder, 12 966 votes: Miguel A. Campos (LP)
13-1	Panamá Oeste Province: Arraiján District	✗ Kayra Harding (PRD); Yesenia Rodríguez (PAN); ✗ Marylin Vallarino (CD)	Half-Quotient, 23 428 votes: Lenin Ulate (LP); Half-Quotient, 20 083 votes: Shirley Castañedas (RM); Remainder, 21 785 votes: Manuel Cheng (LP)
13-4	Panamá Oeste Province: La Chorrera District	✗ Roberto Ábrego (PRD); ✗ Roberto Ayala (PRD); ✓ Lilia Batista (CD)	Half-Quotient, 20 376 votes: Yuzaida Marín (RM); Remainder, 19 311 votes: Lilia Batista (RM); Remainder, 12 107 votes: Patsy Lee (PP)

==== Incumbents who retired ====
The following incumbents opted not to run for reelection or sought a different office:

- Bernandino González (Note: Herrera was elected in 2019 but his term was served by his alternate.)(Panameñista Party): Retired.
- Leopoldo Benedetti (Democratic Change): Retired.
- Hernán Delgado (Democratic Change): Sought to become the alternate deputy for the seat, running for RM with his daughter as the principal candidate.
- Juan Diego Vásquez (Independent): Retired.
- Gabriel Silva (Independent): Retired.
- Mayín Correa (Democratic Change): Retired.
- Edison Broce (Independent): Sought the mayoralty of Panama City.
- Yesenia Rodríguez (Panameñista Party): Retired.
- Yanibel Ábrego (Democratic Change): Sought the Democratic Change presidential nomination.

==== Incumbents defeated ====
60 incumbents ran for reelection, but the vast majority were defeated:

1. Abel Beker (Democratic Revolutionary Party)
2. Daniel Ramos (Democratic Revolutionary Party)
3. Melchor Herrera (Democratic Revolutionary Party)
4. Luis Ernesto Carles (Panameñista Party)
5. Pedro Torres (Panameñista Party)
6. Fernando Arce (Democratic Revolutionary Party)
7. Miguel Fanovich (MOLIRENA)
8. Hugo Méndez (Panameñista Party)
9. Everardo Concepción (Panameñista Party)
10. Juan Esquivel (Democratic Revolutionary Party)
11. Rony Araúz (Democratic Change)
12. Gonzalo González (Democratic Revolutionary Party)
13. Manolo Ruiz (MOLIRENA)
14. Ana Giselle Rosas (Democratic Change)
15. Arnulfo Díaz (Democratic Change) (Note: This member was elected as a member of Democratic Change, but ran for reelection as part of Realizing Goals.)
16. Julio Mendoza (Democratic Revolutionary Party)
17. Eric Broce (Democratic Revolutionary Party)
18. Olivares Frías (Democratic Revolutionary Party)
19. Dalia Bernal (Democratic Change)
20. Leandro Ávila (Democratic Revolutionary Party)
21. Zulay Rodríguez (Democratic Revolutionary Party)
22. Itzi Atencio (Panameñista Party)
23. Pancho Alemán (MOLIRENA)
24. Héctor Brands (Democratic Revolutionary Party)
25. Corina Cano (MOLIRENA)
26. Victor Castillo (Democratic Revolutionary Party)
27. Raúl Fernández (Independent)
28. Génesis Arjona (Democratic Change)
29. Alina González (Democratic Revolutionary Party)
30. Tito Rodríguez (MOLIRENA)
31. Cenobia Vargas (Democratic Revolutionary Party)
32. Edwin Zúñiga (Democratic Change)
33. Elías Vigil (Panameñista Party)
34. Luis Rafael Cruz (Democratic Revolutionary Party)
35. Fátima Agrazal (Democratic Change)
36. Ariel Alba (Democratic Revolutionary Party)
37. Eugenio Bernal (Democratic Revolutionary Party)
38. Ricardo Torres (Democratic Revolutionary Party)
39. Leopoldo Archibold (Democratic Change)
40. Adan Bejerano (Independent)
41. Ricardo Santo (Democratic Revolutionary Party)
42. Kayra Harding (Democratic Revolutionary Party)
43. Marylín Vallarino (Democratic Change)
44. José Junier Herrera (Democratic Change) (Note: This member was elected as a member of Democratic Change, but ran for reelection as part of a PRD-RM alliance.)
45. Roberto Ábrego (Democratic Revolutionary Party)
46. Roberto Ayala (Democratic Revolutionary Party)

==== Incumbents who lost renomination ====
Three incumbents, all of the Democratic Revolutionary Party, were defeated in primary elections:

1. Mariano López (Democratic Revolutionary Party)
2. Alejandro Castillero (Democratic Revolutionary Party)
3. Petita Ayarza (Democratic Revolutionary Party)

==== Controversies ====
Some seats saw disputed results. Twenty-two elected deputies saw their elections challenged.

In Bocas del Toro, one seat was allocated to Democratic Change candidate Yesica Romero, while the second is contested between Benicio Robinson, one of the incumbent PRD members who is also the party's president, and Ubalde Vallejos of the Panameñista Party. Official results certified Robinson as the winner, but Vallejos announced he will challenge the results, alleging Robinson spent 3 million dollars on the campaign, in excess of the 300,000 dollar spending limit imposed. Vallejos formally filed the challenge on 23 May. The challenge was rejected.

In Penonomé, one seat was allocated to Democratic Change candidate Julio De La Guardia, while the second went to Another Way Movement (MOCA) candidate Víctor Carles in preliminary results. In the final results, this seat was instead allocated to PRD incumbent Néstor Guardia. MOCA announced it will challenge these results. The party filed two criminal proceedings in relation to the election, citing "grave irregularities" in the Unofficial Transmission of Results System and requesting access to all entries made to the system from 7 and 10 May.

The tensions caused by the result in the constituency and the Santiago de Veraguas mayoral election prompted the Electoral Tribunal to call for calm.

In the 2–3 constituency, the eligibility of the apparent winner, Dana Castañeda, was the subject of a legal challenge presented before the Electoral Tribunal since before the election. Castañeda was ultimately allowed to take the seat.

The result in the 3-2 constituency, where Nelson Jackson was elected, was challenged by Yinela Ábrego. However, Ábrego did not present the required deposit and so the challenge was dismissed.

In the 8-2 constituency, based in San Miguelito District, preliminary results showed Zulay Rodríguez winning a seat as an independent. However, final results showed the seat instead going to Omar Ortega of Realizing Goals. Rodríguez said 94 votes were taken from her and stated her lawyers will analyze the matter. She later announced she was 64 votes shy of retaining the seat and would challenge the results. Rodríguez formally filed the challenge and was joined by José Ruiloba, a PRD candidate and nephew of reelected deputy Raúl Pineda, who challenged the Vamos slate's third quotient seat. Ruiloba's challenge was dismissed, while Rodríguez's has not yet been resolved.

In Panama City, two seats emerged in contention. José Pérez Barboni, a MOCA member-elect for the 8-3 constituency, said the PRD attempted to swing the constituency's results in favor of their candidates. Paulette Thomas, a Vamos candidate also elected to another one of the constituency's five seats, backed Pérez Barboni's claims and stated her own election was also at risk. Ultimately, Pérez Barboni was certified as a member-elect.

In the 8-4 constituency, also in Panama City, unofficial results showed Grace Hernández of MOCA winning the constituency's fifth seat; these were challenged by Alejandro Pérez of the Realizing Goals party. Later on, PRD incumbent Victor Castillo also tried to claim the seat. Ultimately, Hernández won the seat and has been projected to be elected to the National Assembly of Panama. Pérez later presented a legal challenge to the election of all five deputies in the circuit. The challenge was rejected.

In the 8-6 constituency, in eastern Panama City, the Electoral Prosecutor's Office challenged the election of Alaín Cedeño, designated leader of the Realizing Goals legislative grouping, alleging he exceeded campaign spending limits. Cedeño has accused José Muñoz, a fellow deputy candidate and president of RM's electoral ally, the Alliance Party, of being behind the challenge and the Electoral Prosecutor's Office of trying to give his seat to Muñoz. Later, Cecibel García challenged the constituency's full results. Both challenges were dismissed.

In the 13-4 constituency, based in La Chorrera, PRD candidate Eliécer Montenegro filed a challenge to the election of the constituencies' three deputies, citing "alterations and errors" in the vote count records.

=== Mayoral elections ===
==== Panama City ====
Candidate	Party or alliance		Votes	%
Mayer Mizrachi	People's Party		164,800	32.61
Edison Broce	Independent Postulation 3	Another Way Movement	83,117	16.45
Edison Broce	Independent Postulation 3	Independent	56,441	11.17
Edison Broce	Independent Postulation 3	Total	139,558	27.61
Willie Bermudez	For A Better Panama	Panameñista Party	53,857	10.66
Willie Bermudez	For A Better Panama	Democratic Change	40,891	8.09
Willie Bermudez	For A Better Panama	Total	94,748	18.75
Sergio "Chello" Gálvez	Save Panama	Realizing Goals	51,235	10.14
Sergio "Chello" Gálvez	Save Panama	Alliance Party	6,571	1.30
Sergio "Chello" Gálvez	Save Panama	Total	57,806	11.44
José Luis Fábrega (inc.)	Vamos con todo Panama	Democratic Revolutionary Party	33,174	6.56
José Luis Fábrega (inc.)	Vamos con todo Panama	Nationalist Republican Liberal Movement	4,257	0.84
José Luis Fábrega (inc.)	Vamos con todo Panama	Total	37,431	7.41
Iván Blasser	Independent		8,995	1.78
Raúl Ricardo Rodríguez	Independent Social Alternative Party		2,050	0.41
Total			505,388	100.00
Valid votes			505,388	97.59
Invalid votes			6,081	1.17
Blank votes			6,422	1.24
Total votes			517,891	100.00
Registered voters/turnout			724,406	71.49
Source: Electoral Tribunal

Mayer Mizrachi, candidate of the People's Party, won the Panama City mayoral election with 32.5% of the vote, defeating Edison Broce, an independent Assembly member backed by the Another Way Movement, who took 27.4%. Willie Bermudez, head of the local government of the Don Bosco corregimiento backed by the alliance of the Panameñista Party and Democratic Change, won 18.9%. Sergio "Chello" Gálvez, an Assembly member nominated by the alliance of Realizing Goals and the Alliance Party, came in fourth with 11.4%, while incumbent PRD mayor José Luis Fábrega, also nominated by the PRD's electoral allies, the Nationalist Republican Liberal Movement, came in fifth with 7.4% of the vote.

In the 26-member city council, 7 seats were won by the PRD, 4 by RM, 5 by Vamos-affiliated independents, 4 by the CD/Panameñista alliance, 2 by non-Vamos independents, 2 by MOCA, and 2 by MOLIRENA.

City council results by corregimiento

==== San Miguelito ====
Candidate	Party or alliance		Votes	%
Irma Hernández	Independent		87,740	50.02
Zulay Rodríguez	Save Panama	Realizing Goals	44,174	25.18
Zulay Rodríguez	Save Panama	Alliance Party	10,611	6.05
Zulay Rodríguez	Save Panama	Total	54,785	31.23
Héctor Carrasquilla (inc.)	Vamos con todo Panama	Democratic Revolutionary Party	17,191	9.80
Héctor Carrasquilla (inc.)	Vamos con todo Panama	Nationalist Republican Liberal Movement	3,262	1.86
Héctor Carrasquilla (inc.)	Vamos con todo Panama	Total	20,453	11.66
Ángel Sosa	For A Better Panama	Democratic Change	2,453	1.40
Ángel Sosa	For A Better Panama	Panameñista Party	2,194	1.25
Ángel Sosa	For A Better Panama	Independent	5,129	2.92
Ángel Sosa	For A Better Panama	Total	9,776	5.57
Carlos Escudero	Independent Social Alternative Party		2,650	1.51
Total			175,404	100.00
Valid votes			175,404	97.41
Invalid/blank votes			4,660	2.59
Total votes			180,064	100.00
Registered voters/turnout			251,303	71.65
Source: Electoral Tribunal

Irma Hernández, an independent affiliated with the Coalición Vamos por Panamá, won the San Miguelito mayoral election with just over 50%, defeating her closest rival Zulay Rodríguez (who also ran for president and reelection to the Assembly), nominated by RM and the Alliance Party, who won 31.1%. Héctor Carrasquilla, the incumbent PRD mayor, came in third with 11.7% of the vote. Independent candidates also won a majority of five seats in the city council.

City council results by corregimiento

==== Arraiján ====
Candidate	Party or alliance		Votes	%
Stefany Dayan Peñalba	Independent	Independent	27,172	19.56
Stefany Dayan Peñalba	Independent	People's Party	12,700	9.14
Stefany Dayan Peñalba	Independent	Total	39,872	28.71
Mily Palma	Realizing Goals		23,423	16.86
Rollyns Rodríguez (inc.)	Vamos con todo Panama	Democratic Revolutionary Party	18,729	13.48
Rollyns Rodríguez (inc.)	Vamos con todo Panama	Nationalist Republican Liberal Movement	1,508	1.09
Rollyns Rodríguez (inc.)	Vamos con todo Panama	Total	20,237	14.57
Alexis Lomba	Panameñista Party		17,494	12.60
Alfredo Graham	Independent		12,586	9.06
John Campos	Another Way Movement		10,380	7.47
Belkis Saavedra	Democratic Change		9,369	6.75
Donado Roberto	Independent Social Alternative Party		2,080	1.50
Rolando Calderón	Independent		1,840	1.32
Gabriel Soto	Alliance Party		1,607	1.16
Total			138,888	100.00
Valid votes			138,888	96.68
Invalid/blank votes			4,762	3.32
Total votes			143,650	100.00
Registered voters/turnout			191,551	74.99
Source: Electoral Tribunal

Stefany Dayan Peñalba, an independent endorsed by the PP, won the Arraiján mayoral election, defeating PRD incumbent Rollyns Rodríguez.

==== La Chorrera ====
Eloy Chong of Democratic Change won the La Chorrera mayoral election, defeating incumbent PRD mayor Tomás Vásquez.

==== Colón ====
Diógenes Galván, an independent backed by Democratic Change, won the Colón mayoral election with 30.5% of the vote. Luz Omaira, nominated by RM and Alliance, came in second place, while incumbent PRD mayor Alex Lee came in third.

==== David ====
Joaquín De León, nominated by the Panameñista Party and Democratic Change, won the David mayoral election with 41.5% of the vote, defeating incumbent mayor Antonio Araúz of the PRD-MOLIRENA alliance, who won 17.9%, and Juancy Morales, nominated by RM, who won 17.8%.

==== Santiago de Veraguas ====
The mayoral election in Santiago de Veraguas was extremely close. The vote count, where Eric Jaén of the Another Way Movement and Itzela García of the PRD emerged as the primary contenders, generated tensions between supporters of the PRD and the MOCA, with Juan Diego Vásquez, leader of the Vamos Coalition, asking independent candidates to guard the votes. Ultimately, Jaén won over García by a margin of just two votes. García presented a legal challenge to the results, which was rejected.

==== Penonomé ====
Robin Kam, candidate of Realizing Goals, won the Penonomé mayoral election. He defeated incumbent mayor Paula González.

== Reactions ==
=== Domestic ===
Fellow candidate Ricardo Lombana congratulated Mulino on his victory, followed by Martín Torrijos and Rómulo Roux.

Pedro Miguel González, a member of the Democratic Revolutionary Party, called for the resignation of the party's National Executive Committee, including that of party president Benicio Robinson, in the wake of the party's overwhelming defeat. Crispiano Adames, a reelected Assembly member, stated the party's internal situation was rather deteriorated, and resigned his position as first vice-president of the party. Robinson agreed with the need for restructuring but resisted calls for his resignation.

The board of directors of Democratic Change, led by Rómulo Roux, activated the process to select a new board of directors following the party's defeat. Other party members directly called for Roux's resignation as party president, including former Roux allies like outgoing Penonomé mayor Paula González and Raúl Andrade. Several members, including outgoing Assembly member Mayín Correa, called for the party to ally itself with the incoming Realizing Goals administration. Yanibel Ábrego ultimately won the party's presidency in its internal 2024 elections.

The Panameñista Party started a review process to consider whether or not to replace the party leadership. Other party members, led by former president Mireya Moscoso and Jaime Alemán, said the alliance with Democratic Change was a mistake and called for Blandón to step down from the party leadership.

=== International ===
- El Salvador — President Nayib Bukele was the first international leader to call Mulino to congratulate him.
- United States — Secretary of State Antony Blinken congratulated Mulino on his victory, and said that he looked forward to continued strategic partnerships and curbing irregular migration through the Darien Gap.
- European Union — The European External Action Service praised the high turnout and congratulated Mulino while saying they looked forward to working with the new administration. They also sent an Election Expert Mission to make a technical assessment of the electoral process.
