= Mayer Mizrachi =

Panamanian businessman and politician (born 1987)

Mayer Matalon
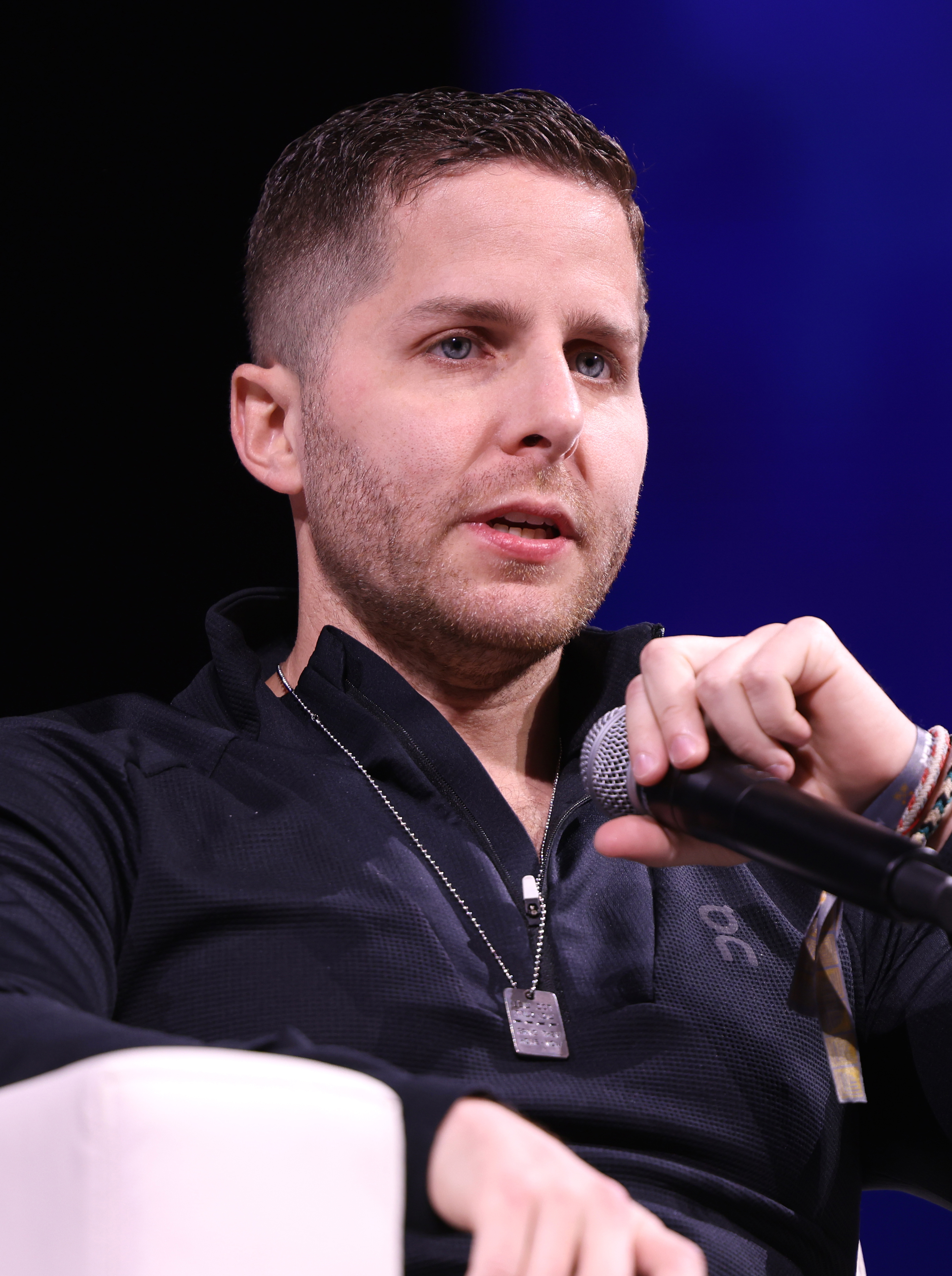
- Mizrachi in 2025

Mayor of Panama City
- Incumbent
- Assumed office 1 July 2024
- Deputy: Roberto Ruiz Díaz
- Preceded by: José Luis Fábrega

Personal details
- Born: Mayer Mizrachi Matalon; 25 August 1987 (age 39) Panama City, Panama
- Party: People's Party
- Occupation: Businessman; influencer; politician
- Known for: Founder of Criptext

Mayer Mizrachi Matalon (born 25 August 1987) is a Panamanian businessman, influencer, and politician. A member of the People's Party, he has served as the mayor of Panama City since 1 July 2024.

== Early life ==
Mizrachi was born on 25 August 1987 in Panama City to a Jewish family. Mizrachi is a surname from the Sephardim.

== Business and technology ==
Mizrachi is the founder of the secure email service Criptext. According to the company, Criptext began in 2014 as an encryption extension for Gmail and later evolved into a standalone email service focused on end-to-end encryption and user privacy. In 2018, the company announced a relaunch positioning Criptext as an email platform "built around privacy", describing a model where the inbox is stored on the user's device and using the Signal Protocol library for end-to-end encryption. Panamanian press has also described Criptext as a privacy-oriented independent email application.

He also founded GeekyDrop, an e-commerce marketplace, and subsequently Geeky Motors, a vehicle-import venture focused on Tesla vehicles in Panama.

Mizrachi has also promoted Elapp, a cross-platform, nearby file-sharing application.

== Political career ==
In early 2024, the People's Party announced Mizrachi as its candidate for Mayor of Panama City for the 2024–2029 term. After the general elections in May 2024, he was announced as the winner and was sworn in alongside vice mayor Roberto Ruiz Díaz on 2 July 2024 at the Palacio Municipal Demetrio H. Brid.

== Mayor of Panama City (2024–present) ==
Municipal communications and national media have highlighted an agenda focused on administrative modernization, digital services, and process streamlining, including innovation projects intended to digitize municipal procedures and improve service delivery.

=== Digital government and service modernization ===
The municipality introduced the Digital Temporary Construction Authorization (Spanish: Autorización Transitoria Digital de Construcción) as part of initiatives aimed at reducing bureaucracy in permitting and construction–related procedures.

=== Payments and public finance initiatives ===
In April 2025, the Municipal Council approved a mechanism enabling municipal payments using cryptocurrencies, with conversion handled via an intermediary and participation described as voluntary.

=== Public works and neighborhood projects ===
Municipal reporting has highlighted road repairs and works in communities such as Chilibre, as part of broader public works programming. Municipal publications also described a 2025 investment agenda including projects such as digital-library/study spaces and "pocket parks". TVN profiled the administration's broader plan and referenced multiple decentralized projects implemented across corregimientos.

=== International engagement and regional visibility ===
During Mizrachi's tenure, Panama City has increased its visibility in regional and international forums, including by hosting large-scale conventions. In January 2026, the city hosted the International Economic Forum on Latin America and the Caribbean organized by the Development Bank of Latin America and the Caribbean, which included an address by the mayor opening the forum's second day.

In September 2025, Panama City hosted the 22nd edition of Premios Juventud. This marked the first time the awards show was held outside U.S. territory, staged at the Figali Convention Center in Panama City.

Panama City also participates in city-to-city cooperation frameworks, including the Union of Ibero-American Capital Cities.
