= Adames =

Adames /ˈɑːdɔːmɪs/ is a surname. It could refer to:

- Carlos Adames (born 1994), Dominican boxer
- Crispiano Adames (born 1961), Panamanian politician
- Cristhian Adames (born 1991), Dominican baseball infielder
- María Teresa Adames (born 1941), Mexican diver
- Nicolas Adames (1813–1887), Bishop of Luxembourg
- Vinicio Adames (1927–1976), Venezuelan musician
- Willy Adames (born 1995), Dominican baseball shortstop
