= Gabriel Silva (Panamanian politician) =

Panamanian lawyer and politician (born 1989)

Honorable Gabriel Silva
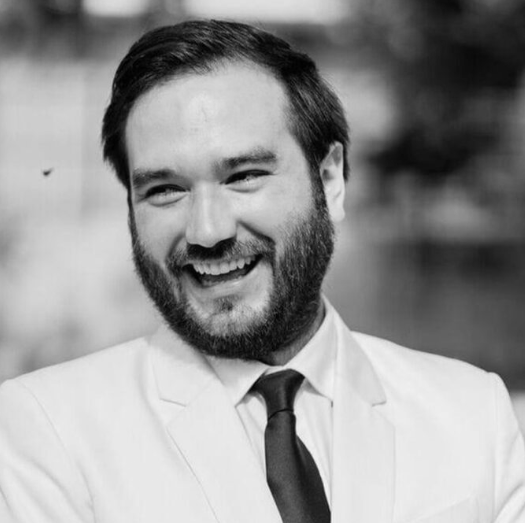

Panamanian Congressman for Circuit 8-7
- Incumbent
- Assumed office July 1, 2019
- President: Laurentino Cortizo
- Deputy: Walkiria Chandler D'Orcy

Personal details
- Born: April 7, 1989 (age 37) Panama City, Panama
- Party: Independent Candidate
- Education: Universidad Católica Santa María La Antigua; Oxford University; Columbia University
- Occupation: Congressman, lawyer, consultant, university professor
- Website: www.gabrielsilvadiputado.com

Gabriel Eduardo Silva Vignoli (born April 7, 1989), is a lawyer, university professor and Panamanian politician, former Congressman in The National Assembly of Panama representing the 8-7 Circuit as an Independent politician.

== Biography ==
Gabriel Silva obtained a bachelor's degree in Law and Political Sciences from Universidad Católica Santa María La Antigua in 2011, where he would also later obtain a master's degree in Higher Education and serve as a professor. While he was studying, he was elected President of the Law Students' Association and the Federation of University Students. After graduating, he worked as a legal manager for Procter & Gamble for five years.

In 2016, as a Chevening Scholarship scholar, he obtained a master's degree in Public Policy from the Blavatnik School of Government of the Oxford University in United Kingdom. In 2017, as part of the Fulbright Program, he obtained a master's degree in Laws from Columbia University in New York City, United States. He is also a Lee Kuan Yew Senior Fellow from the National University of Singapore, a Harvard Executive Fellow and a Yale World Fellow.

In February 2018, he announced his intention to run as an independent candidate for a seat at the National Assembly of Panama. After months of collecting signatures, and reaching the number required by the National Electoral Tribunal, he became an official candidate for the Assembly. He was the Independent pre-candidate for the 8-7 Circuit with most signatures and less expenses.

He was elected as a Congressman for The National Assembly of Panama in the 2019 Panamanian general election with 17,471 votes for the 8-7 circuit, which corresponds to the Ancón, Betania, Bella Vista, Calidonia, Curundú, El Chorrillo, Pueblo Nuevo, Santa Ana and San Felipe jurisdictions. He received the second highest number of votes for an independent candidate for congress. During his term as a Congressman, he has presented many anti-corruption proposals, pro-transparency and education reforms, mental health law, among others.

Gabriel Silva is also the co-founder of Coalición Vamos, a political movement in Panama that played a pivotal role in the 2024 elections by recruiting, supporting, endorsing, and training over 100 independent candidates. Despite being a young organization, VAMOS achieved remarkable success, securing the election of 20 out of 71 Members of Congress, several mayors, and over a dozen local governments.
