= Zulay Rodríguez =

Panamanian lawyer, professor and politician

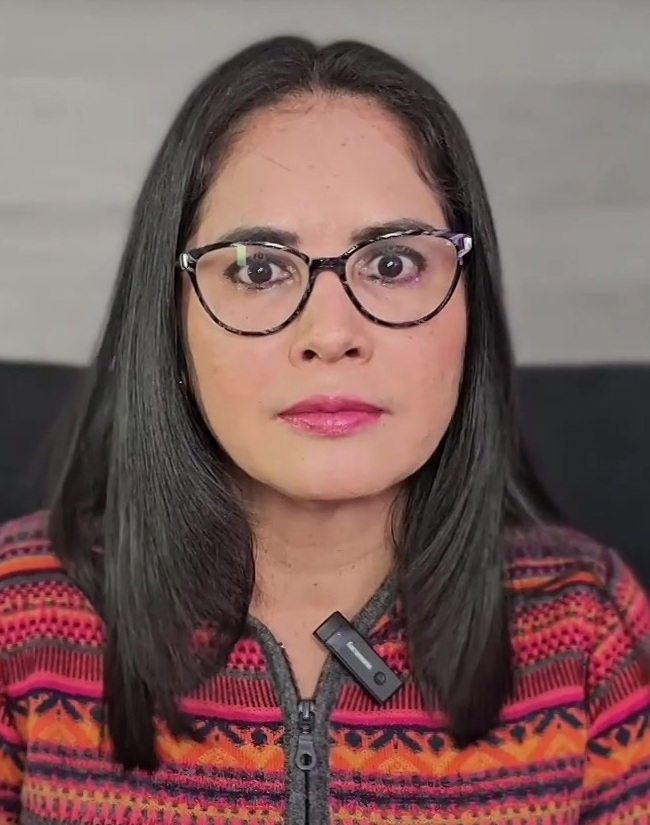

First Vice President of the National Assembly of Panama
- In office July 1, 2019 – July 1, 2024
- Preceded by: Leandro Ávila
- Succeeded by: Didiano Pinilla

Deputy of the National Assembly of Panama
- In office July 1, 2014 – July 1, 2024
- Constituency: Circuit 8-6 (San Miguelito District)

Personal details
- Born: Zulay Rodríguez Lu; June 20, 1969 (age 57) San Miguelito, Panama
- Party: Democratic Revolutionary Party
- Education: Latin American University of Science and Technology
- Occupation: Lawyer, professor, politician
- Website: www.zulayrodriguez.com

Zulay Rodríguez Lu (Chinese: 罗淑丽; born June 20, 1969) is a Panamanian lawyer, professor, and politician of the Democratic Revolutionary Party (PRD). She is a former deputy for Circuit 8–6 and was the First Vice President of the National Assembly.

== Biography ==
Zulay Rodríguez is the daughter of prominent teacher Gladis Lu and former Attorney General Rafael Rodríguez. She earned her degree in law and political science cum laude at the Santa María La Antigua Catholic University (USMA) in 1992.

Subsequently, she took specialized studies and earned a master's degree in procedural law at the University of Panama. She then obtained a master's in environmental law from the University of London, which also included courses in international economic law and policies. She also earned a bachelor's in social sciences with an emphasis in criminology at Florida State University. Finally, she obtained a master's in higher education from the Latin American University of Science and Technology (ULACIT).

Rodríguez held various positions in the justice system. She has worked as a professor of human rights and politics, social thought, and criminal law at the USMA, as well as the USMA postgraduate program in human rights. She worked as a professor of general procedural law and criminal procedure at the University of Panama, and is a professor of human rights at the ULACIT.

== Political career ==
In the 2014 general election, Rodríguez was elected deputy to the National Assembly for Circuit 8–6, corresponding to San Miguelito District, under the PRD banner. On July 11, 2018, she announced her candidacy for the presidency of Panama in the 2019 election for the PRD, expressing disinterest in another run for deputy and feeling "disgusted" at her inability to effect change in the Assembly, but even that she also run for deputy. On September 4, she presented 14 proposals that she would implement if she were elected president of Panama, ranging from agricultural measures to the equitable distribution of wealth. In the PRD primary, held on September 16, 2018, Rodriguez received 18% of votes, surpassed by Laurentino Cortizo with 68%, and finishing ahead of former President Ernesto Pérez Balladares, who ranked third with 7%. On July 1, 2019, Rodríguez was elected First Vice President of the National Assembly.

On July 9, 2019, after being reelected deputy, she gained media attention by presenting a draft law with various restrictions and regulations regarding immigration status also got notorious because she was notorious for her particular support to ex-president Ricardo Martinelli. The requirements to attain legal immigration status in Panama considered in the law would be residence, proven economic solvency, registration in social security, and payment of taxes, thus "tightening" the measures within the 2008 Decree Law on the National Migration Service. Rodríguez referred to Venezuelan immigration to Panama in the draft, stating that if any immigrants did not comply with its provisions, they would have to leave Panamanian territory. This elicited various criticisms, with some groups of foreign nationals and naturalized citizens calling her "xenophobic", and characterizing her comments as ones of "hate, politicism, and divisionism."

She ran for presidency during the 2024 general election as an independent along with her running mate Athenas Athanasiadis. She lost after receiving 150,338 votes or 6.61% of the total vote.
