= Edison Broce =

Panamanian politician, lawyer, and environmental advocate (born 1990)

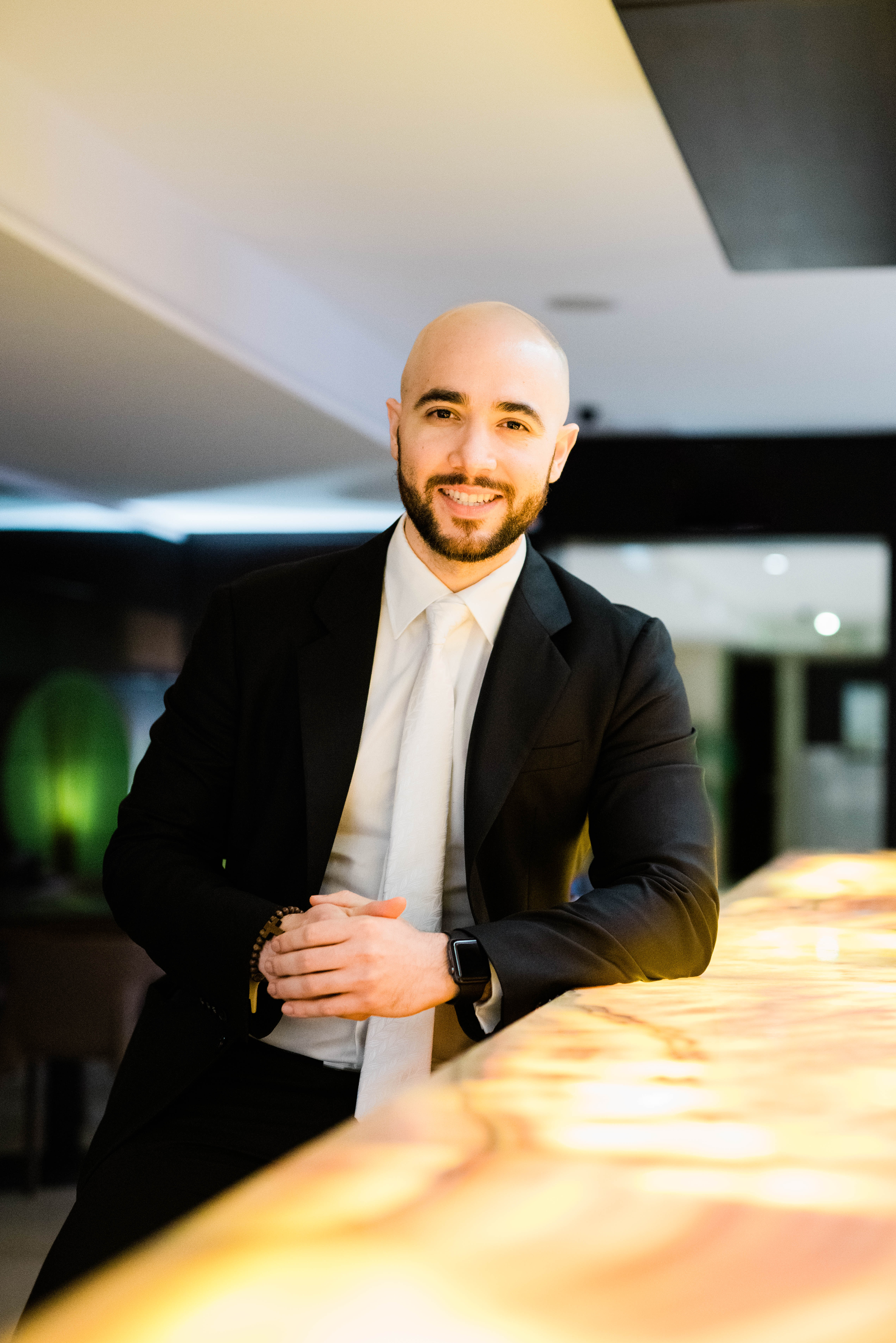

Parliamentarian of the National Assembly (Panama)
- In office 2019-2024 Serving with Yaidelis González
- Incumbent
- Assumed office July 1, 2019 Serving with Yaidelis González
- Constituency: Don Bosco, Juan Díaz, Parque Lefevre, Río Abajo, San Francisco

Personal details
- Born: 1 November 1990 (age 35) Panama City (Panama)
- Party: Independent Politician
- Education: Blavatnik School of Government (Master of Public Policy); Universidad Católica Santa María La Antigua (Master in Procedural Law)
- Alma mater: Universidad Católica Santa María La Antigua (Law Degree)
- Occupation: Lawyer, environmentalist, politician
- Website: edisonbroce.com

Edison Augusto Broce Urriola (born 1 November 1990) is a Panamanian independent politician, lawyer, and environmental advocate serving as a member of parliament in the National Assembly of Panama for the 2019-2024 legislative term.

He is one of the youngest Panamanian lawmakers and is widely known for his environmental policies and raising awareness about plastic pollution. Since July 1, 2020, he is the Head of the Independent Caucus of the National Assembly of Panama.

== Education ==
He began his law studies at the University of Panama and graduated cum laude from Universidad Católica Santa María La Antigua, where he also obtained a master's degree in procedural law, completing his thesis in Environmental Law graduating summa cum laude.

He founded the university's first environmental group and was on the team that won the Panamanian national round of the Philip C. Jessup International Law Moot Court Competition in 2013. In 2015, he was awarded the Chevening Scholarship to pursue a master's degree in public policy at University of Oxford.

In 2017 he was recognized by the Junior Chamber International in their field "Political, Legal and/or Governmental Affairs". He also served as the first president in U.S. Embassy Youth Advisory Council, where he founded Eco Exito, a community based recycling project, which grew into an independent non-governmental organization.

Broce is a member of the International Panel of Parliamentarians for Freedom of Religion or Belief. Within this network, he has participated in parliamentary duties nationally and internationally.

== Political career ==
From 2014 to 2019, he served in the National Assembly of Panama as an alternate member. In the general elections of Panama in 2019, he was elected as a deputy before the National Assembly by circuit 8-8. Together with his independent colleagues elected in 2019, he renounced the privileges enjoyed by parliamentarians, such as exemption from import tax of cars, use of public funds, postal and telephone franchise, donations, items, appointments, or any structure or opaque management of public affairs. They also formed the first independent caucus in the history of the Republic of Panama.

== Legislative work ==
The pillars of his agenda have been education, environment and well-being. His initiatives include the first recycling law of the Republic of Panama, for whose work in 2020 British Vogue recognized him as a notable leader, and the Law 187 of December 2, 2020 "that regulates the reduction and progressive replacement of single-use plastics."

He was the proponent of Law 32 of March 17, 2020, on reducing the use of paper in public administration; a rule of common sense, which with simple measures aims to control the massive consumption of sheets of paper by the State, to train public servants in good environmental practices and to include sanctions in the internal regulations of government entities for those who fail to comply with the provisions of the law. In addition, in 2022 he achieved the approval of Law 295 of April 25, 2022, on electric mobility in the Republic of Panama.

He was the proponent of Law 223 of June 8, 2021, on Environmental Incentives in the Republic of Panama, by which tax exemptions and incentives were established as of the year 2022 to promote sustainable business practices, the reconversion of companies, and the development of the recycling industry in Panama.

In 2019, he asked the floor of the National Assembly of Panama to create an Investigation Commission on deforestation in the province of Darién, in which more than 21 thousand hectares of forests have been deforested in the last seven years. After the creation of the commission was approved, he was elected President of the commission and held numerous sessions and hearings with high-ranked public servants, such as the Minister of the Environment and the administrator of the National Land Administration Authority. However, the field investigations phase has had to be suspended due to the setbacks generated by the COVID-19 pandemic.

He is currently the President of the Education, Culture, Science, Technology and Communication Commission of the Latin American and Caribbean Parliament (PARLATINO).
