= Coalición Vamos =

Let's Go Coalition Coalición Vamos
- Leader: Juan Diego Vásquez; Gabriel Silva
- Founded: 5 April 2022
- Ideology: Government transparency Anti-corruption
- Political position: Big tent
- Colors: Navy; Gold
- Slogan: ¡Vamos a hacerlo bien! ('We'll do it well!')
- Deputies: 16 / 71

Party flag

Website
- vamosporpanama.com

The Coalición Vamos (lit. 'Let's Go Coalition') is an electoral coalition and political alliance in Panama, aimed at supporting non-affiliated candidates in their bids for election to the National Assembly as well as various local government entities. It describes itself as supportive of government transparency and anti-corruption, among other policies.

In the 2024 Panamanian general election, 19 candidates backed by the Coalición Vamos were elected, while one more joined after the elections. The coalition's candidates joined the opposition.

On August 29, 2026, the coalition's General Assembly decided that Vamos would evolve into a duly registered political party, and it began the process of collecting signatures.
