= Ricardo Lombana =

Panamanian lawyer and politician

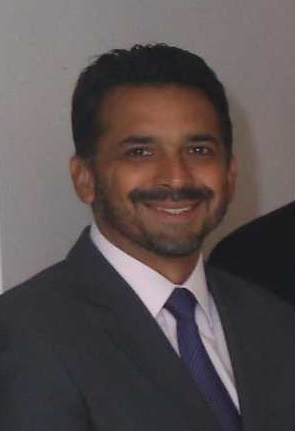
- Born: Ricardo Alberto Lombana González; 26 November 1973 (age 52); Panama City, Panama
- Occupations: Lawyer, journalist, politician
- Political party: Another Way Movement
- Spouse: Aileen Adames (matr. 2000; div. 2023)
- Children: 2

Ricardo Alberto Lombana González (born 26 November 1973) is a Panamanian lawyer and politician. He ran for the presidency in the 2019 Panamanian general election as an independent candidate receiving 18.78% of the vote.

== Biography ==
Lombana was born in Panama City. His father, Roberto Lombana, is a native of Proaza, Asturias, Spain and he is the great-nephew of Clara González, who founded the National Feminist Party of Panama in the 1920s and was the first Panamanian female lawyer.

Lombana studied at the Lasallian school of Colegio De La Salle in Panama City after which he attended the University of Panama, where he obtained a law degree in 1998. Two years later, in 2000, he moved to Washington, D.C., where he obtained a master's degree in International and Comparative Law at George Washington University. He then went on to study International Human Rights Law at the University of Oxford, and International Economic Policy, Securities and Tax Law at Harvard University.

Following his studies in 2002, he was appointed special delegate for freedom of expression in the Ombudsman's Office before working in the Panamanian embassy in Washington, D.C., first as Minister Counsellor, before being appointed counsul general from 1 September 2004 till 19 March 2007. Lombana also worked at the newspaper La Prensa as chief of information and then editorial deputy director. In 2008, Lombana joined the law firm Galindo, Arias & López and remained a part of it until 2013, when he founded his own law firm Lombana Law & Media.

Lombana also ran an anti-corruption campaign called "‘Juego Limpio Panamá" (Play Fair Panama).

In 2017, he announced his intention to run as an independent for President in the May 2019 election. On 24 December 2018, Lombana chose the former magistrate of the Electoral Tribunal, Guillermo Márquez Amado, as his running mate. After obtaining 108,492 signatures, Lombana was accepted as a candidate. His campaign called for austerity, a new constitution, anti-corruption measures, social security reforms and immigration control.

In the election, he came third with 18.78% of the vote. He announced that he would run again in the 2024 election and as a first step announced the creation of the Movimiento Otro Camino political party, but eventurally still lost in the second place with 24.59% of the vote.
