= Workers Party (Marxist–Leninist) =

Workers Party (Marxist–Leninist) (in Spanish: Partido Obrero (Marxista-Leninista)) was a Trotskyist political party in Panama. PO(M-L) was founded in 1934 by Diógenes de la Rosa. For a brief period PO(M-L) was able to compete with the Communist Party over influence in the trade union movement, the tenants movement and other mass movements.

PO(M-L) struggled against the U.S. hegemony over Panama.
