= Alliance Party (Panama) =

Alliance Party Partido Alianza
- Founder: José Muñoz
- Founded: March 2, 2018
- Split from: Democratic Change
- Ideology: National liberalism
- Political position: Centre-right
- Colours: Red, White
- Seats in the National Assembly: 2 / 71
- District Mayors: 9 / 81
- Corregimiento Representatives: 0 / 702
- Seats in the Central American Parliament (Panamanian seats): 1 / 20

Website
- partidoalianza.com

The Alliance Party (Spanish: Partido Alianza) is a centre-right political party in Panama.

The party was founded on March 2, 2018, by federal deputy José Muñoz (formerly of the Democratic Change party). As of April 2019 the party listed more than 39,000 members.

Initially, the party sought to have its own electoral offer and held its presidential primaries on October 7, 2018, having as winner José Domingo Arias, former presidential candidate of the CD during 2014; However, the low participation in the primaries and the subsequent resignation of Arias as a presidential candidate on December 26, 2018, led to the rapprochement of the party with the CD, and an alliance was formed between the two parties a few days later, to participate in the 2019 general election and having Rómulo Roux of the CD as the presidential candidate of the "A change to wake up" alliance.

== Platform ==
The party is considered a liberal nationalist one, supporting gender equality and defending the secular state.

== Election results ==
=== Presidential elections ===
Election	Candidate	Votes		Vote %		Result
Election	Candidate	Party	Alliance Total	Party	Alliance Total	Result
2019	Rómulo Roux	44,706	609,003	2.28	31.00	✗ Lost
2024	José Raúl Mulino	110,245	778,772	4.85	34.23	✓ Elected

=== National Assembly elections ===
Election	Leader	Votes	%	Seats	+/–	Government
2019	José Muñoz	43,670	2.42% (#6)	0 / 71	New	Opposition
2024	José Muñoz	62,313	2.91% (#8)	2 / 71	▲2	Opposition

=== PARLACEN elections ===
The amount of seats allocated for the PARLACEN is based on the vote share obtained by each party in the presidential election.

Election	Leader	Votes	%	Seats	+/–
2019	José Muñoz	44,706	2.28% (#5)	1 / 20	New
2024	José Muñoz	120,544	5.30% (#7)	1 / 20	0
