= José Luis Fábrega =

Panamanian politician and engineer

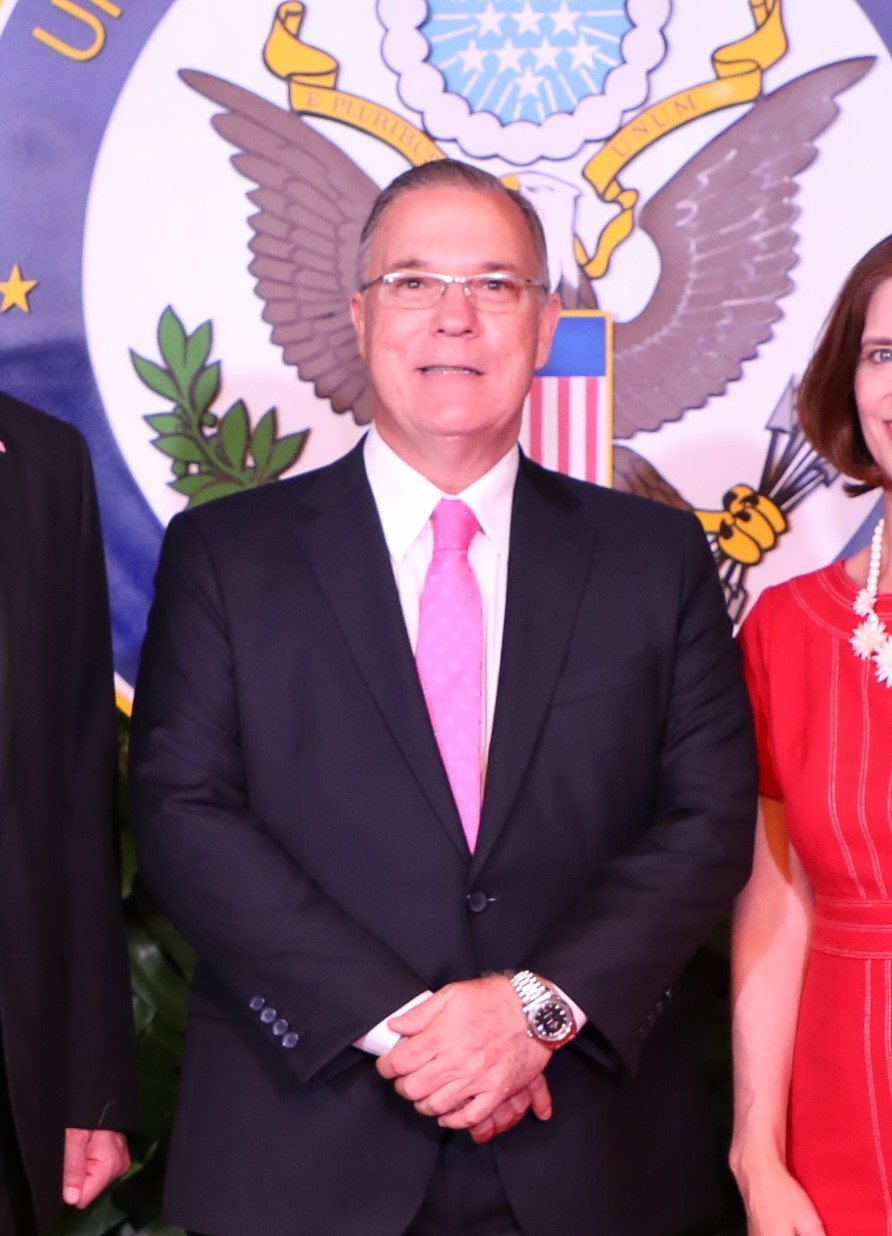
Fábrega in 2019

José Luis Fábrega Polleri (born May 8, 1962) is a Panamanian politician and engineer. A member of the Democratic Revolutionary Party (PRD), Fábrega was the Mayor of Panama City from 2019 to 2024. Prior to this, Fábrega served as a member of the National Assembly from 1999 to 2014.

== Early life and education ==
Fábrega was born to Jaime Ignacio Fábrega Quelquejeu and Beatriz Polleri Pérez in Panama City on May 8, 1962. He graduated from Santa Maria La Antigua Catholic University (USMA) with a degree in engineering in 1986. He later attended the Catholic University of America in the United States, where he graduated with a mechanical engineering degree in 1988.

== Political career ==
In the 1990s, Fábrega entered politics as a member of the Christian Democratic Party (now the "People's Party"). He later joined the Arnulfista Party and was elected to the National Assembly in the 1999 general election. In 2003, Fábrega joined the Solidarity Party and was reelected in the 2004 general election.

In 2006, he left the Solidarity Party join the Democratic Revolutionary Party (PRD), and was reelected in the 2009 election. In 2013, Fábrega announced his candidacy for Mayor of Panama City, and defeated Balbina Herrera to receive the PRD's nomination in the 2014 mayoral election. However, Fábrega narrowly lost the general election to José Isabel Blandón Figueroa. Fábrega successfully ran for Mayor of Panama City in 2019.
