= Realizing Goals =

Realizing Goals Realizando Metas
- Abbreviation: RM
- Leader: Ricardo Martinelli
- Chairman: Vicente Enrique Gálvez
- Secretary: Luis Eduardo Camacho
- Founder: Ricardo Martinelli
- Founded: 24 March 2021
- Split from: Democratic Change
- Youth wing: Juventud RM
- Membership (2025): ▼285,715
- Ideology: Conservatism; Conservative liberalism; Right-wing populism; Economic liberalism; Social conservatism
- Political position: Right-wing
- Slogan: ¡Súmate! ('Join us!')
- National Assembly: 15 / 71
- District Mayors: 10 / 81
- Corregimiento Representatives: 98 / 701
- Central American Parliament (Panamanian seats): 9 / 20

Website
- somosrmpa.com

Realizing Goals (Spanish: Realizando Metas, RM) is a conservative political party in Panama. It was recognized by the Electoral Tribunal of Panama on 24 March 2021. The party is led by the former president of Panama, Ricardo Martinelli. As of November 2025, the party had 285,715 members. It has been the ruling party since José Raúl Mulino was sworn in as president on 1 July 2024.

== History ==
Realizing Goals was founded by Ricardo Martinelli after splitting from the Democratic Change (CD) party. After Martinelli was arrested for illegal wiretapping during his presidency on 12 June 2017, Rómulo Roux took over as a leader of the Democratic Change party. After Martinelli was acquitted of the charges in August 2019, he demanded the renewal of CD's board of directors, but was rejected. In February 2020, a faction led by Martinelli decided to renounce CD and create the Realizing Goals party.

Initially, the new party was proposed as the "Martinelist Party". However, the electoral regulations rejected it, as it is forbidden to name a party using the name of a living person. As an alternative, several names were chosen using the initials of the former president Martinelli (RM), with Realizing Goals (Realizando Metas) being the most accepted. After holding a constitutive convention and collecting the necessary signatures, the electoral authorities officially recognized the party on 24 March 2021.

For the 2024 general election, the party initially nominated Martinelli as a presidential candidate, seeking his second presidential term. After Martinelli was convicted on money laundering charges in July 2023, and the Supreme Court rejected his appeal on 2 February 2024, he was rendered ineligible to be president. José Raúl Mulino, Martinelli's choice for vice president, became the party's candidate for President instead.

== Election results ==
=== Presidential elections ===
Election	Candidate	Votes		Vote %		Result
Election	Candidate	Party	Alliance Total	Party	Alliance Total	Result
2024	José Raúl Mulino	668,527	778,772	29.39	34.23	✓ Elected

=== National Assembly elections ===
Election	Leader	Votes	%	Seats	+/–	Government
2024	Ricardo Martinelli	367,378	17.17% (#1)	13 / 71	New	Government

=== PARLACEN elections ===
The amount of seats allocated for the PARLACEN is based on the vote share obtained by each party in the presidential election.

Election	Leader	Votes	%	Seats	+/–
2024	Ricardo Martinelli	668,527	29.39% (#1)	9 / 20	New
