= Crispiano Adames =

Panamanian politician (born 1961)

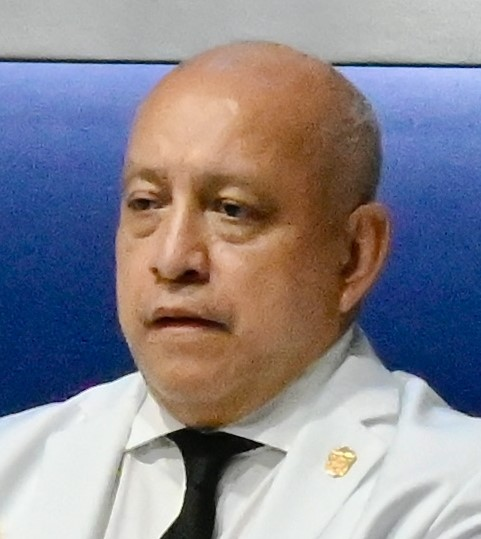
Crispiano Adames

Crispiano Adames (born 1961) is a Panamanian politician who served as President of the National Assembly of Panama from 1 July 2021 to 1 July 2023 and Deputy of Democratic Revolutionary Party.
