= Independent Social Alternative Party =

Independent Social Alternative Party Partido Alternativa Independiente Social
- Abbreviation: PAIS
- Leader: José Alberto Álvarez
- Founded: 13 May 2021
- Registered: 16 September 2021
- Dissolved: 26 June 2024
- Membership (2021): 21,143
- Ideology: Economic liberalism Social conservatism Christian right
- Political position: Right-wing
- National affiliation: Firmo por Panamá
- Colours: Orange
- Slogan: The Orange Road
- National Assembly: 0 / 71
- PARLACEN: 0 / 20

Website
- larutanaranjapais.com

The Independent Social Alternative Party (Spanish: Partido Alternativa Independiente Social; PAIS) was a conservative and evangelical political party in Panama. It was officially recognized as a party on September 16, 2021, and it was chaired by the lawyer José Alberto Álvarez. It has 28,143 members (November 2021). The party was declared extinct on June 26, 2024, due to the party's poor performance during the 2024 general elections.

== History ==
The political formation had started its process in May 2017, with the aim of participating in the 2019 general elections. PAIS managed to obtain in June 2018 almost 38,000 signatures necessary to establish itself as a political party.

However, a series of irregularities were detected in the registration and the Electoral Prosecutor of Panama, Eduardo Peñaloza, challenged 1,140 signatures; claiming that PAIS activists had attended a demonstration against the marriage of same-sex couples where various protesters signed the books believing that it was some kind of survey, without knowing that they were registering with a political party and without the presence of electoral officials. The president of PAIS, José Alberto Álvarez, had repudiated the challenge, indicating particular interests of the electoral prosecutor, and that due to the situation he would elect to elect to register candidates in the Nationalist Republican Liberal Movement (Molirena) through an agreement.

In the end, the Electoral Tribunal, through a ruling of October 27, 2018, invalidated some 511 signatures and was only seven signatures to be constituted as a political party, losing the opportunity to participate directly in the 2019 elections. However, PAIS formalized the electoral pact with Molirena and later, after the latter party sealed an alliance with the Democratic Revolutionary Party, some candidates from PAIS were included in the "Uniendo Fuerzas" alliance to participate in the electoral contest.

After the May 2019 elections, the party in formation resumed the search for signatures and in October 2020 they obtained some 39,842 signatures, and without any challenge the Electoral Court certified compliance with the minimum number of adherents. On May 13, 2021, it held its constitutive convention and on September 16, 2021, it formally received the official registration as a political party.

== Ideology ==
The party presents itself as an economically liberal party, with respect to private property, the free market and economic openness. Additionally, it is presented as a party that seeks a constituent assembly, and since May 2021 it is part of the alliance Firmo por Panamá (together with the Panameñista Party, Democratic Change and other organizations), which seeks to collect signatures to convene a parallel assembly. The party has also manifested its fight against corruption.

In addition, the party seeks the defense of the family "under the legal, biblical and Christian precept" and shows its opposition to equal marriage and sexual education.

The party is noted to have a strong evangelical influence, because a significant part of the membership belongs to the Reformed Action Movement (MAR), a group of Panamanian evangelical religious leaders, pastors and spiritual guides. Part of the board of directors is made up of evangelical pastors such as Orlando Quintero (first vice president of the party), Horacio Freeman (general secretary), among others. In fact, President José Alberto Álvarez is a relative of Pastor Edwin Álvarez, who presides over the Hosanna Apostolic Community. Despite the situation, Álvarez himself categorically points out that PAIS is not an evangelical party.

== Election results ==
=== Presidential elections ===
Election	Candidate	Votes		Vote %		Result
Election	Candidate	Party	Alliance Total	Party	Alliance Total	Result
2024	Melitón Arrocha	2,442	4,660	0.11	0.20	✗ Lost

=== National Assembly elections ===
Election	Leader	Votes	%	Seats	+/–	Government
2024	José Alberto Álvarez	34,250	1.60% (#9)	0 / 71	New	Extra-parliamentary

=== PARLACEN elections ===
The amount of seats allocated for the PARLACEN is based on the vote share obtained by each party in the presidential election.

Election	Leader	Votes	%	Seats	+/–
2024	José Alberto Álvarez	2,442	0.11% (#9)	0 / 20	New
