= Another Way Movement =

Another Way Movement Movimiento Otro Camino
- Abbreviation: MOCA
- Leader: Ricardo Lombana
- Founded: 19 November 2019
- Registered: 29 June 2022
- Membership (2022): 46,615
- Ideology: Anti-corruption
- Political position: Big tent
- Colours: Dark blue Orange
- National Assembly: 3 / 71
- District Mayors: 1 / 81
- Corregimiento Representatives: 0 / 702
- Seats in the Central American Parliament (Panamanian seats): 0 / 20

Website
- otrocamino.org

The Another Way Movement (Spanish: Movimiento Otro Camino; MOCA) is a political party in Panama, recognized by the Electoral Tribunal of Panama on 29 June 2022. The leader of the party is former presidential candidate Ricardo Lombana. The party has 46,615 adherents (June 2022).

The movement emerged as an independent political group seeking Lombana's presidential candidacy through free candidacy in the 2019 elections, however they came in third place behind the Democratic Revolutionary Party (PRD) and Democratic Change.

After the elections, the movement aimed to become a political party, arguing that the electoral rules favored the parties and there were disadvantages in the free application. On November 19, 2019, the group formally requested before the Electoral Court its intention to become a political party. It was recognized as a party in formation on February 10, 2020 and after the constitutive convention of May 22, 2022, it was recognized as a political party by the court on June 29, 2022.

The party seeks Lombana's participation in the 2024 presidential elections, and they also consider themselves an anti-corruption party.

== Election results ==
=== Presidential elections ===
| Election | Candidate | Votes | | Vote % | | Result |
| Election | Candidate | Party | Alliance Total | Party | Alliance Total | Result |
|---|---|---|---|---|---|---|
| 2024 | Ricardo Lombana | 559,432 | | 24.59 | | ✗ Lost |

=== National Assembly elections ===
| Election | Leader | Votes | % | Seats | +/– | Government |
|---|---|---|---|---|---|---|
| 2024 | Ricardo Lombana | 149,462 | 6.99% (#5) | 3 / 71 | New | Opposition |

=== PARLACEN elections ===
The amount of seats allocated for the PARLACEN is based on the vote share obtained by each party in the presidential election.

| Election | Leader | Votes | % | Seats | +/– |
|---|---|---|---|---|---|
| 2024 (Note: Another Way Movement did not field any candidate for PARLACEN in this election despite contesting the presidential one.) | Ricardo Lombana | 559,432 | 24.59% (#2) | 0 / 20 | New |
