= National Assembly (Panama) =

Unicameral legislature of Panama

National Assembly of the Republic of Panama Asamblea Nacional de la República de Panamá

Type
- Type: Unicameral

History
- Founded: 1906

Leadership
- President: Shirley Castañedas (RG) since 1 July 2026
- First vice president: Manuel Cohen (CD) since 1 July 2026
- Second vice president: Manuel Cheng (Ind.) since 1 July 2026
- General secretary: Carlos Alvarado (PRD) since 1 July 2024

Structure
- Seats: 71 members
- Political groups: Government (17): Realizing Goals (15); Alliance Party (2); Support (25): PRD (12); Democratic Change (8); MOLIRENA (1); People's Party (1); Independent (3); Opposition (29): Vamos Coalition (16); Panameñista Party (8); Seguimos Group (4): MOCA (3); Independent (1); Independent (1)
- Length of term: 5 years

Elections
- Voting system: First-past-the-post voting in outlying rural districts and party-list proportional representation in cities
- Last election: 5 May 2024
- Next election: 6 May 2029

Meeting place
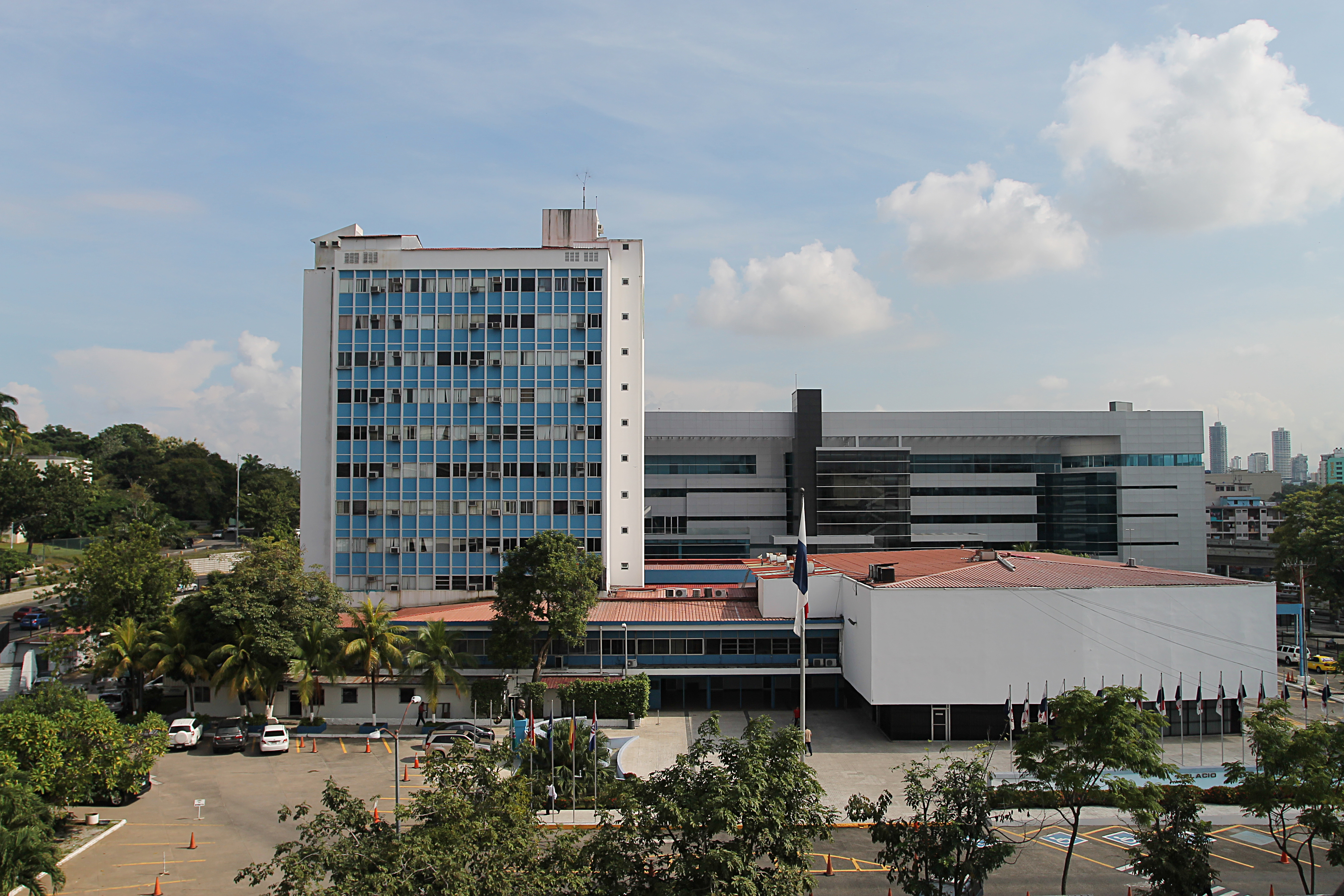

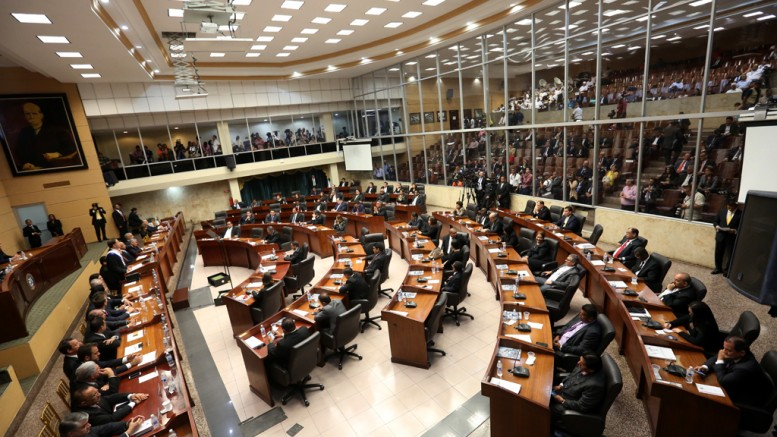
- Justo Arosemena Palace, Panama City

Website
- www.asamblea.gob.pa

The National Assembly of Panama (Spanish: Asamblea Nacional de Panamá), formerly the Legislative Assembly of Panama (Asamblea Legislativa de Panamá), is the legislative branch of the government of the Republic of Panama.

It is a unicameral legislature, currently made up of 71 members, who serve five-year terms. Legislators from outlying rural districts are chosen by a first past the post method, while districts located in more populous towns and cities elect multiple legislators by means of a proportion-based formula. Panama's legislative elections are held simultaneous with its presidential and local elections.

Panama also returns a delegation of 20 deputies to the supranational Central American Parliament.

== Latest election ==
=== Legislative election ===
Parties seats distribution in panama national assembly 2024
Party	Votes	%	Seats	+/–
Realizing Goals	367,378	17.17	15	New
Democratic Revolutionary Party	347,692	16.25	12	−23
Democratic Change	239,529	11.19	8	−10
Panameñista Party	227,692	10.64	8	0
Another Way Movement	149,462	6.99	3	New
People's Party	128,504	6.01	2	+2
Nationalist Republican Liberal Movement	67,908	3.17	1	−4
Alliance Party	62,313	2.91	2	+2
Independent Social Alternative Party	34,250	1.60	0	New
Independents	514,900	24.06	20	+15
Total	2,139,628	100.00	71	0
Valid votes	2,139,628	94.49		
Invalid votes	61,340	2.71		
Blank votes	63,404	2.80		
Total votes	2,264,372	100.00		
Registered voters/turnout	2,999,625	75.49		
Source: Tribunal Electoral

== See also ==
- List of political parties in Panama
- List of presidents of the National Assembly of Panama
- Politics of Panama
