= 2026 in Panama =

- Decades: 2000s; 2010s; 2020s
- See also: Other events of 2026; Timeline of Panamanian history

The following lists events in the year 2026 in Panama.

== Incumbents ==
- President: José Raúl Mulino
- Vice President: To be determined

== Events ==
- 29 January — The Supreme Court rules that a concession granted to Panama Ports Company, a subsidiary of Hong Kong-based CK Hutchison Holdings, to operate ports on both ends of the Panama Canal is unconstitutional.
- 10 February – Two boats carrying migrants capsize off the coast of Guna Yala, killing three people.
- 23 February – The Panamanian government seizes control of the Balboa and Cristóbal terminals of the Panama Canal following the revocation of the CK Hutchison Holdings concession.
- 11–23 June – Panama participates at the 2026 World Cup.
- 9 October – 2026 Panama earthquake: A magnitude 7.7 earthquake hits near Tonosí, injuring 27 people.
- 21 October – The US sanctions a Panama- and Greece-based law firm, stating that it facilitated Iran’s shadow fleet for years and indirectly supported the Iranian regime's capacity to produce income to fund its nuclear program.

== Holidays ==
- 1 January – New Year's Day
- 9 January – Martyrs' Day
- 17 February – Carnival
- 3 April – Good Friday
- 1 May – Labour Day
- 3 November – Separation Day from Colombia
- 5 November – Colon Day
- 10 November – Uprising of Los Santos
- 28 November – Independence Day
- 8 December – Mother's Day
- 20 December – National Mourning Day
- 25 December – Christmas Day

== Art and entertainment ==
- List of Panamanian submissions for the Academy Award for Best International Feature Film

== Deaths ==
- 15 February – Melitón Sánchez Rivas, 91, member of the International Olympic Committee (1998–2014).
- 24 August – Mitchell Doens, 79, former Minister of Labour and secretary general of the Democratic Revolutionary Party
- 8 September – María de la Cruz "Toto" Murillo, 81, boxing trainer and coach.
- 8 September – Ismael Laguna, 83, professional boxer.
