= 2020 in Panama =

- Decades: 2000s; 2010s; 2020s
- See also: Other events of 2020; Timeline of Panamanian history

Events in the year 2020 in Panama.

== Incumbents ==
- President: Laurentino Cortizo
- Vice President: José Gabriel Carrizo
- President of the National Assembly: Marcos Castillero

== Events ==
- 7 January – The Panama Canal watershed is at its fifth driest in 70 years, according to the Panama Canal Authority.
- 5 February – Panamanian President Laurentino Cortizo fires Security Minister Rolando Mirones and Government Minister Carlos Romero after the February 3 prison escape of Gilberto Ventura Ceballos.
- 9 February – The Chamber of Commerce, Industry and Agriculture of Panama (CCIAP) requests that foreigners be allowed to work in the country in order to promote economic development.
- 13 February – A new metro line will go under the Panama Canal to reach western suburbs of Panama City at a cost of US$2.5 billion. It is part of a $4 billion infrastructure project including a bridge over the canal.
- 9 March – COVID-19 pandemic in Panama: The first confirmed case of COVID-19 in the country is reported.
- 13 March – COVID-19 pandemic
  - The government declared a state of emergency. The move frees US$50 million for a period of 180 days to purchase goods and services to combat COVID-19.
  - Leaders of Panama, Belize, Costa Rica, Guatemala, Honduras, Nicaragua, and the Dominican Republic signed an agreement for dealing with the coronavirus pandemic.
- 15 March – In a historic first, all Peace Corps volunteers worldwide are withdrawn from their host countries.
- 28 March – COVID-19 pandemic: Panama and Costa Rica fail in attempts to move thousands of migrants from Africa, Asia, and Haiti amassed in shelters as a precaution against COVID-19. Panama has 901 confirmed infections and 17 deaths.
- 28 April – Juan Carlos Muñoz, vice-minister of the Presidency of Panama resigns after being accused of corruption.
- 29 April – Residents of Felipillo, Panama, block the Pan-American Highway for twelve hours, demanding the bono solidario (solidarity bonus) promised by the government in response to the COVID-19 pandemic.
- 11 June – The World Health Organization (WHO) reports a decrease in malaria in Latin America, although there are fears that many cases are going undetected as sick people stay home instead of going to hospitals. Honduras, Panama, and Nicaragua report increases, the last by 25%.
- 9 July – COVID-19 pandemic: Panama reports 41,251 cases, which puts it in first place in Latin America for the number of infections based upon population, ahead of Brazil and Mexico. Panama has 4,316,453 inhabitants for a rate of 104.6 cases per million inhabitants.
- 12 July – Dr. Maria Franca Tallarico, the head of health for the Americas regional office of the International Federation of Red Cross and Red Crescent Societies warns that many Latin American countries have reduced efforts to combat dengue fever outbreaks.
- 25 July – COVID-19 pandemic: Mexico and Japan send medical supplies to ten Latin American countries, including Panamá, Salvador, Guatemala, Honduras, and Nicaragua.
- August 17 – COVID-19 pandemic: Panama reopens hair salons and churches.
- 4 September – An earthquake with a 5.6 magnitude strikes Panama and Costa Rica; no reported injuries or damages.
- 11 September – United States invasion of Panama: Remains of victims of the 1989 invasion in Colón are exhumed for identification.
- 13 September – COVID-19 pandemic: Panama reports about 100,000 cases, higher than anywhere else in Central America. Panama is also the Central American country that has performed the most tests—389,000.
- 15 September – Governor Erick Martelo of Guna Yala is forced to resign after being caught traveling in a car containing 79 packages of illegal drugs.
- 16 December – COVID-19 pandemic: Panama approves the Pfizer-BioNTech COVID-19 vaccine, which is scheduled to be administered in the first trimester of 2021.
- 24 December – COVID-19 Pandemic: Two hundred doctors arrive from Cuba to fight the virus.

== Deaths ==
- August 2 – Bobby Prescott, baseball player (b. 1931).
- September 16 – Apolonio Lombardo, 86, footballer (national team).
- October 13 – Arysteides Turpana, 76, Guna writer, academic and poet.

== See also ==
- 2020 in Central America
- 2020 in the Caribbean
- 2020 in politics and government
- COVID-19 pandemic in Panama
- Central American Parliament
- List of number-one tropical songs of 2020 (Panama)
- 2020s
- 2020s in political history
