= 2016 in Panama =

- Decades: 1990s; 2000s; 2010s; 2020s
- See also: Other events of 2016; Timeline of Panamanian history

Events in the year 2016 in Panama.

== Incumbents ==
- President: Juan Carlos Varela
- Vice-President: Isabel Saint Malo

== Events ==
- April 26- Miss Panama 2016 occurs.

== See also ==
- List of number-one pop songs of 2016 (Panama)
- List of number-one tropical songs of 2016 (Panama)
- List of number-one urban songs of 2016 (Panama)
