= 2022 in Panama =

- Decades: 2000s; 2010s; 2020s
- See also: Other events of 2022; Timeline of Panamanian history

The following lists events in the year 2022 in Panama.

== Incumbents ==
- President: Laurentino Cortizo
- Vice President: José Gabriel Carrizo

== Events ==
Ongoing — COVID-19 pandemic in Panama

- 17 February – Panama-flagged car carrier MV Felicity Ace is abandoned approximately 90 nautical miles southwest of the Azores following a severe fire on board. The ship's entire 22-man crew safely evacuates using lifeboats.
- 17 March – Panama's maritime authority states that Russia has attacked three Panamanian-flagged civil vessels in the Black Sea since the Russian invasion of Ukraine began on February 24, causing one of the ships to sink. No deaths have been reported.
- 20 April – The United States signs an agreement with Panama to help stop undocumented immigration.
- 5 July – Panama confirms its first case of monkeypox.
- 12 July – Protesters in Panama continue blocking streets and railways, mainly in Chiriquí and Veraguas Provinces, rejecting the concession by president Laurentino Cortizo of freezing fuel prices.
- 16 July – Protests continue in Panama with road and railways blockades, after protesters rejected president Laurentino Cortizo's concessions.

== Deaths ==
- 7 January – Ruby Moscoso de Young, 80, Panamanian politician, first lady (1999–2004)
- 2 February – Robert Blalack, 73, visual effects artist (Star Wars, RoboCop, The Day After), Oscar winner (1978)
- 3 February – Felipe Virzi, 79, politician and businessman, second vice president (1994–1999)
- 29 August – Rigoberto Riasco, 69, boxer, WBC super bantamweight champion (1976).
- 18 September – Carmen A. Miró, 103, sociologist, statistician, and demographer.
