= 2024 in Panama =

- Decades: 2000s; 2010s; 2020s
- See also: Other events of 2024; Timeline of Panamanian history

The following lists events in the year 2024 in Panama.

== Incumbents ==
Until 1 July:

- President: Laurentino Cortizo
- Vice President: José Gabriel Carrizo

From 1 July:

- President: José Raúl Mulino
- Vice President: To be determined

== Events ==
=== February ===
- 22 February – The Supreme Court of Panama orders the arrest of former president Ricardo Martinelli, who is under the protection of the Nicaraguan embassy in Panama City after seeking asylum there.

=== May ===
- 4 May – Panama bans First Quantum Minerals from extracting copper following the closure of its Cobre Panamá mine in 2023.
- 5 May – 2024 Panamanian general election. José Raúl Mulino is elected as President.

=== June ===
- 7 June – One person is killed in a gun attack on a campus of the University of Panama in Veraguas Province.
- 29 June – A court acquits Jürgen Mossack, Ramón Fonseca and 26 other defendants of money laundering in relation to the Panama Papers scandal involving the Mossack Fonseca law firm, citing insufficient evidence.

=== July ===
- 1 July – José Raúl Mulino is inaugurated as President of Panama.
- 2 July – Panama and the United States sign a deal to curb the flow of migration to the southern United States border through the Darién Gap. The United States will cover the costs of repatriating migrants who enter Panama illegally.
- 24 July – Ten migrants are killed after being swept away by strong currents while crossing a river near Carreto in the Darién Gap.
- 29 July – Panama suspends diplomatic relations with Venezuela and withdraws its diplomatic personnel from the country until a full review of the presidential election results in Venezuela is concluded.

=== August ===
- 7 August – The National Border Service arrests 15 people on suspicion of running a trafficking network smuggling Chinese nationals through the Darién Gap.
- 19 August – The first repatriation flight of migrants from Panama under a US-financed plan begins, with 29 Colombians being deported.

=== December ===
- 24 December - A protest is held at the U.S. Embassy in Panama City over U.S. President-elect Donald Trump's threat to take back the Panama Canal. Protesters also refer to him as a "public enemy" of Panama.

== Art and entertainment ==
- List of Panamanian submissions for the Academy Award for Best International Feature Film

== Holidays ==
- 1 January – New Year's Day
- 9 January – Martyrs' Day
- 13 February – Carnival
- 29 March – Good Friday
- 1 May – Labour Day
- 3 November – Separation Day from Colombia
- 5 November – Colon Day
- 10–11 November – Uprising of Los Santos
- 28 November – Independence Day
- 8 December – Mother's Day
- 20 December – National Mourning Day
- 25 December – Christmas Day

== Deaths ==
- 28 January – Luis Tejada, (b. 1982) footballer (Juan Aurich, Universitario, national team).
- 7 March – Pedro Altamiranda (b. 1935), singer.
- 18 March – Chavelita Pinzón (b. 1931), folklorist and singer.
- 8 May – Ramón Fonseca Mora (b. 1952), lawyer and co-founder of Mossack Fonseca.
- 26 May – Samuel Lewis Galindo (b. 1927), businessman, politician, and author.
