= 2019 in Panama =

- Decades: 1990s; 2000s; 2010s; 2020s
- See also: Other events of 2019; Timeline of Panamanian history

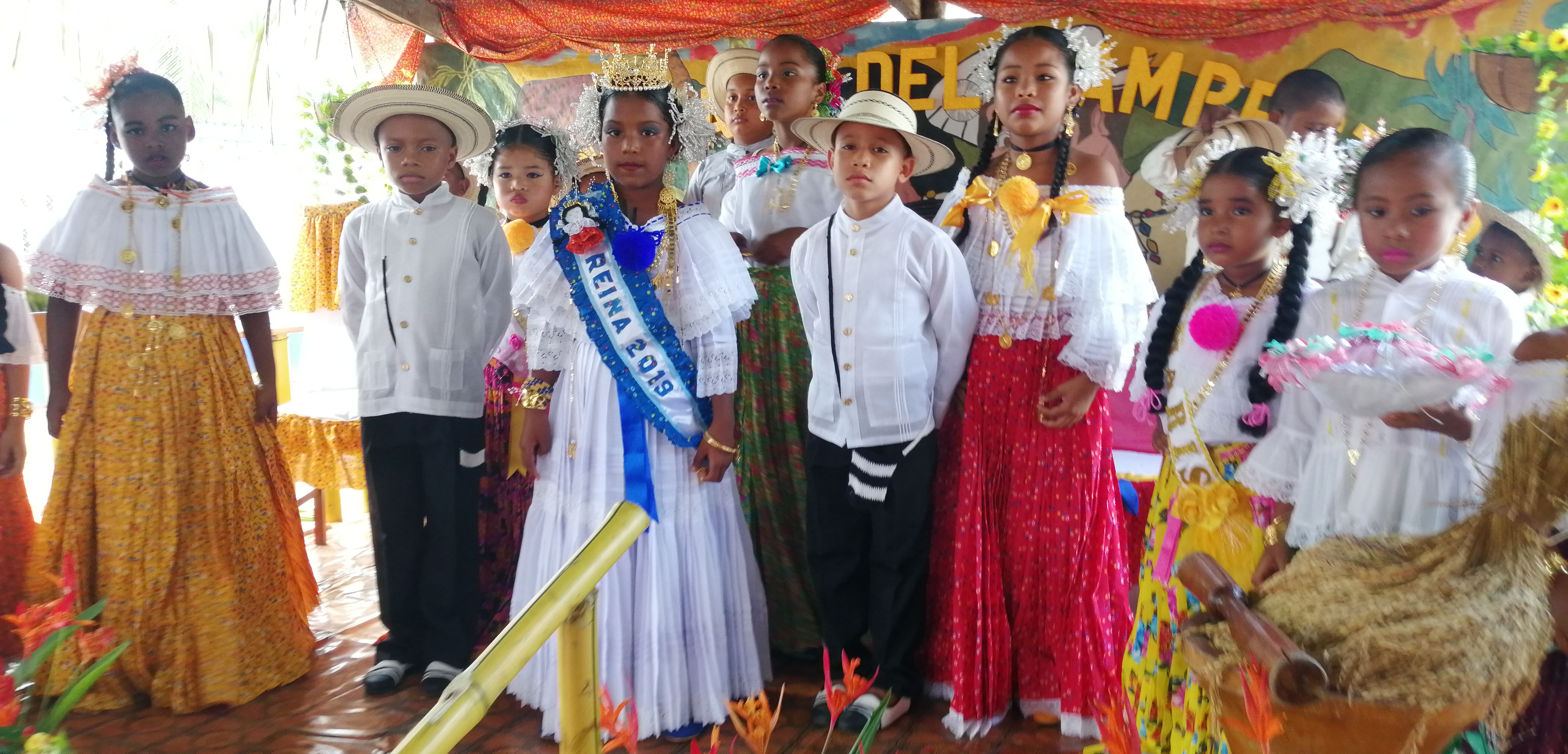
Celebration of Farmers' Week in Panama, 2019

Events in the year 2019 in Panama.

== Incumbents ==
- President: Juan Carlos Varela (until 1 July), Laurentino Cortizo (starting 1 July)
- Vice President: Isabel Saint Malo (until 1 July), Jose Gabriel Carrizo (starting 1 July)

=== Legislative ===
- President of the National Assembly: Yanibel Abrego

== Events ==
- 22 to 27 January – The World Youth Day 2019 was celebrated in Panama City
- 5 May – scheduled date for the 2019 Panamanian general election

== Deaths ==
- 1 March – Eusebio Pedroza, boxer, WBA featherweight champion (b. 1956).

== See also ==
- List of number-one tropical songs of 2019 (Panama)
