= Public holidays in Panama =

Public holidays in Panama include:

== Holidays ==
Panama's national public holidays are:

- January 1 New Year's Day
- January 9 Martyrs' Day
- Carnival Tuesday before Carnival Monday
- Good Friday
- May 1 Labour Day
- November 3 Separation Day
- November 4 Flag Day -Observed only by Public Agencies and all schools. Not a holiday for the private sector.
- November 5 Colón Day
- November 10 "Primer Grito de Independencia de la Villa de Los Santos" celebrating The Gesture of Rufina Alfaro and the uprising in the Villa de Los Santos against Spain.
- November 28 Independence Day (from Spain, 1821)
- December 8 Mother's Day
- December 20 National Mourning Day
- December 25 Christmas Day

== Variable dates ==
- 2023
  - Carnaval begins (Monday) – February 24
  - Ash Wednesday – February 26
  - Good Friday – April 10
- 2021
  - Carnaval begins (Monday) begins – February 15
  - Ash Wednesday – February 17
  - Good Friday – April 2
- 2022
  - Carnaval begins (Monday) – February 28
  - Ash Wednesday – March 2
  - Good Friday – April 15
- 2023
  - Ash Wednesday – February 22
  - Good Friday – April 7
- 2024
  - Ash Wednesday – February 14
  - Good Friday – March 29
- 2025
  - Good Friday – April 18

== Fiestas Patrias (National Holidays) ==
The holidays in November (starting from Separation Day), are called the Fiestas Patrias ("National Holidays"). All of Panama’s National Holidays are in the month of November. On November 3 the country celebrated its separation from Colombia in 1903. Panama became a part of the Great Colombia after receiving its independence from Spain on November 28, 1821. The United States helped in this separation process as they had a vested interest in building the Panama Canal. November 4 is the day of the Panamanian National Symbols which celebrates the flag, coats of arms and national anthem. The 5th of November is the Separation of Colon from Colombia where the last Colombian troops remained. November 10 is the Cry of Independence (from Spain) which is mainly celebrated in La Villa de Los Santos.

These dates are all national festivities, except November 4 which is a work day but most people compensate by working extra hours to be able to take it off. Expect a lot of movement to the countryside, especially on the 3, 4 and 5 of November when most hotels get full. Tourism on the 10 and 28 depends on the holiday being on a Monday or Friday, making it a long weekend.
