= 2021 in Panama =

- Decades: 2000s; 2010s; 2020s
- See also: Other events of 2021; Timeline of Panamanian history

The following lists events in the year 2021 in Panama.

== Incumbents ==
- President: Laurentino Cortizo
- Vice President: José Gabriel Carrizo

== Events ==
Ongoing — COVID-19 pandemic in Panama

- January 29 – Panama reopens its land borders for the first time since March 2020, setting off a new wave of migration.

== Deaths ==
=== January to March ===
- 12 January – Adolfo Paredes, 43, lawyer.
- 26 January – Richard Holzer, architect (born 1923).
- 4 February – Jaime Murrell, 71, Christian singer and songwriter; COVID-19.
- 7 February – Roberto Hansell, 68, footballer (Tauro FC).
- 9 February – Diógenes Vergara, 50, politician, Deputy (2014–2019); shot.
- 25 February – Frank Holness, 82, basketball player; cerebral ischemia.
- 2 March – Telma Barria Pinzón, diplomat (consul of Panama in Colombia); drowned
- 3 March – Tomas Altamirano Duque, 93, politician, Vice President of Panama (1994–1999).
