= 2025 in Panama =

- Decades: 2000s; 2010s; 2020s
- See also: Other events of 2025; Timeline of Panamanian history

The following lists events in the year 2025 in Panama.

== Incumbents ==
- President: José Raúl Mulino
- Vice President: To be determined

== Events ==
=== January ===
- 16 January – FIFA suspends Manuel Arias as president of the Panamanian Football Federation for six months after he called Panama women's national football team player Marta Cox "fat".
- 21 January – Panama sends a complaint to the United Nations over US President Donald Trump's threat to take back the Panama Canal.

=== February ===
- 2 February – US Secretary of State Marco Rubio travels to Panama in his first foreign trip as secretary, urging President José Raúl Mulino to reduce Chinese influence in the Panama Canal. In response, Mulino says that his country would not renew their contracts with China's Belt and Road Initiative when it expires.
- 5 February – The United States announces an agreement allowing its government vessels free passage through the Panama Canal, which is denied by the Panama Canal Authority.
- 6 February – President Mulino announces Panama's withdrawal from the Belt and Road Initiative.

=== March ===
- 15 March – An explosion and subsequent fire at the La Chorrera Thermoelectric Power Plant in Panamá Oeste Province causes a nationwide blackout.
- 27 March – The government grants former President Ricardo Martinelli safe passage to leave the country for Nicaragua.

=== April ===
- 11 April – Panama and the United States sign an agreement allowing U.S. troops to be deployed near the Panama Canal for training, exercises, and other activities.
- 16 April – A coalition of citizens ask the Supreme Court of Panama to declare as unconstitutional the Panama–U.S. troop deployment agreement signed five days earlier, with a legal counsel accusing the United States of seeking "to reestablish military bases on Panamanian territory."
- 28 April – A strike is held by around 5,000 workers of Chiquita Brands at its facility in Bocas del Toro Province.

=== May ===
- 10 May – The Panamanian government announces the departure of former president Ricardo Martinelli for Colombia following a grant of asylum from President Gustavo Petro.
- 21 May – Saúl Méndez, the secretary-general of the National Union of Construction and Similar Workers, breaks into the Bolivian embassy seeking asylum after arrest warrants are issued in connection with a money-laundering investigation into the union and anti-government protests that it led.
- 28 May – A state of emergency is declared in Bocas del Toro Province due to the ongoing strike by workers of Chiquita Brands and the layoff of 5,000 employees.
- 30 May – The government allows First Quantum Minerals to export more than 120,000 tons of previously extracted copper concentrate from the closed Cobre Panamá mine to fund its maintenance.

=== June ===
- 5 June – Five people are injured during clashes between security forces and protesters from the indigenous Embera community in Arimae, Darien Province over social security reform.
- 10 June – The European Union removes Panama from its list of high risk jurisdictions for money laundering and terrorism financing.
- 19 June – Venezuela and Panama announce an agreement to restore consular services following a dispute caused by the 2024 Venezuelan presidential election.
- 20 June – Another state of emergency is declared in Bocas del Toro Province due to the ongoing strike by workers of Chiquita Brands and protests against pension reform.

=== August ===
- 29 August – The government signs an agreement with Chiquita Brands allowing for the company's resumption of operations in Panama following the March strikes and rehire thousands of dismissed workers.

=== October ===
- 31 October – An arbitral tribunal in the United States rules in favor of Panama in a lawsuit filed against the Panamanian government by Sacyr over its $2.3 billion claim for expansion works on the Panama Canal in 2018.

=== November ===
- 18 November – Panama qualifies for the 2026 FIFA World Cup after defeating El Salvador 3–0 at the 2026 FIFA World Cup qualification.

=== December ===
- 11 December – The United States imposes sanctions Panamanian businessman Ramon Carretero on suspicion of transporting Venezuelan oil.

== Holidays ==
- 1 January – New Year's Day
- 9 January – Martyrs' Day
- 4 March – Carnival
- 18 April – Good Friday
- 1 May – Labour Day
- 3 November – Separation Day from Colombia
- 5 November – Colon Day
- 10–11 November – Uprising of Los Santos
- 28 November – Independence Day
- 8 December – Mother's Day
- 20 December – National Mourning Day
- 25 December – Christmas Day

== Art and entertainment ==
- List of Panamanian submissions for the Academy Award for Best International Feature Film
