= Oscar Terán (lawyer) =

Panamanian lawyer

Oscar Terán (Panama July 22, 1868 – 1936) was a Panamanian lawyer who served in the Senate of Colombia when Panama was still part of Colombia.

He wrote the following books:

- Relación de viaje: Tierra Santa y los paises que bañan el Mediterreaneo oriental (1924-1925)
- Escritos y Discursos y Del Tratado Herrán-Hay al Tratado Hay-Bunau Varilla (1936)
