= 2017 in Panama =

- Decades: 1990s; 2000s; 2010s; 2020s
- See also: Other events of 2017; Timeline of Panamanian history

Events in the year 2017 in Panama.

== Incumbents ==
- President: Juan Carlos Varela
- Vice-President: Isabel Saint Malo

=== Legislative ===
- President of the National Assembly: Rubén de León

== Events ==
- 13 to 22 January – The 2017 Copa Centroamericana was hosted in Panama.

== Deaths ==
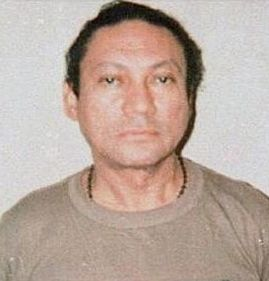
Manuel Noriega

- 13 February – Ricardo Arias Calderón, politician, former Vice President (born 1933).
- 15 April – Amílcar Henríquez, footballer (b. 1983).
- 29 May – Manuel Noriega, dictator and military official, military ruler (b. 1934).

== See also ==
- List of number-one tropical songs of 2017 (Panama)
