= 2023 in Panama =

- Decades: 2000s; 2010s; 2020s
- See also: Other events of 2023; Timeline of Panamanian history

The following lists events in the year 2023 in Panama.

== Incumbents ==
- President: Laurentino Cortizo
- Vice President: José Gabriel Carrizo

== Events ==
Ongoing — COVID-19 pandemic in Panama

=== January ===
- 25 January – The United States bars former president Ricardo Martinelli from entering the country, accusing him of accepting bribes during his 2009–2014 administration.

=== February ===
- 15 February – Gualaca bus crash: At least 39 illegal immigrants are killed in Gualaca District, Chiriquí Province, when their bus, intended to be driven to the United States, falls off a cliff.

=== April ===
- 21-30 April – The 16th Pan American Surf Games are held in Santa Catalina. 234 athletes from 19 nations compete, Brazil win, and 42 Pan American Games spots are awarded.

=== July ===
- 1 July – Panama Pride in Panama City draws over 15,000 people, with music, decorations, and protests against the Supreme Court’s same-sex marriage ruling.
- 20 July – The Panama Canal Authority (ACP) reduces the average daily transit capacity to 32 vessels per day due to late rains and low water levels.
- 31 July – The relocation of the Guna community from Gardi Sugdub is delayed to February 2024 due to overcrowding and incomplete mainland infrastructure.

=== September ===
- 3 September – Panamanian professional footballer Gilberto Hernández is shot dead and seven others are wounded by gunmen in Colón.
- 8 September – Panama announces stricter measures to curb record migration through the Darien Gap, including more deportations, shorter tourist stays, and higher financial requirements.

=== October ===
- 3 October – Panama competes at the Pan American Games in Santiago with 69 athletes, winning 8 medals.

=== November ===
- 2 November – Panama’s lawmakers agree to modify a proposed bill that aimed to annul a recently approved Cobre Panamá contract.
- 8 November – A 77-year-old man with Dual American-Panamanian citizenship shoots and kills two people protesting a mining contract in front of news cameras.
- 9 November – Human Rights Watch reports widespread abuse of migrants crossing the Darién Gap into Panama, with over 457,000 crossings in 2023 and exploitation by criminal groups like the Gulf Clan.
- 16 November – Panama holds the National Robotics Olympics with CABEI support, attracting nearly 100,000 visitors and promoting STEAM education for students and teacher training.
- 25 November – Anti-mining activists gather outside Panama’s Supreme Court in Panama City as deliberations begin on constitutional challenges to First Quantum Minerals’ contract for the Cobre Panamá mine.
- 28 November –The Supreme Court declares the law granting First Quantum Minerals a mining contract for the Cobre Panamá mine unconstitutional, after which President Laurentino Cortizo announced that the mine would be closed.

== Deaths ==
- 1 February – Lucy Quintero, folk singer (born 1948).
- 3 September – Gilberto Hernández, footballer (born 1997).
