= 2015 in Panama =

- Decades: 1990s; 2000s; 2010s; 2020s
- See also: Other events of 2015; Timeline of Panamanian history

The following lists events that happened during 2015 in Panama.

== Incumbents ==
- President: Juan Carlos Varela
- Vice President: Isabel Saint Malo

== Events ==
=== January ===
- January 2 – The Panama-owned MV Better Trans cargo ship sprang a leak and foundered in the Philippine Sea with the loss of one of her nineteen crew.
