= 2014 in Panama =

- Decades: 1990s; 2000s; 2010s; 2020s
- See also: Other events of 2014; Timeline of Panamanian history

The following events happened in Panama in the year 2014.

== Incumbents ==
- President: Ricardo Martinelli (until 1 July), Juan Carlos Varela (starting 1 July)
- Vice President: Juan Carlos Varela (until 1 July), Isabel Saint Malo (starting 1 July)

== Events ==
=== March ===
- March 5 - Nicolás Maduro, the President of Venezuela, severs diplomatic and political ties with Panama, accusing Panama of being involved in a conspiracy against the Venezuelan government.
