= 1903 in Panama =

- Decades: 1880s; 1890s; 1900s; 1910s; 1920s
- See also: Other events in 1903; Timeline of Panamanian history

Events in the year 1903 in Panama.

== Events ==
=== November ===
- November 18: The Hay–Bunau-Varilla Treaty, creating the Panama Canal Zone.
