= List of number-one tropical songs of 2020 (Panama) =

This is a list of the tropical number-one songs of 2020 in Panama. The charts are published by Monitor Latino, based exclusively for tropical songs on airplay across radio stations in Panama using the Radio Tracking Data, LLC in real time. The chart week runs from Monday to Sunday.

== Chart history ==
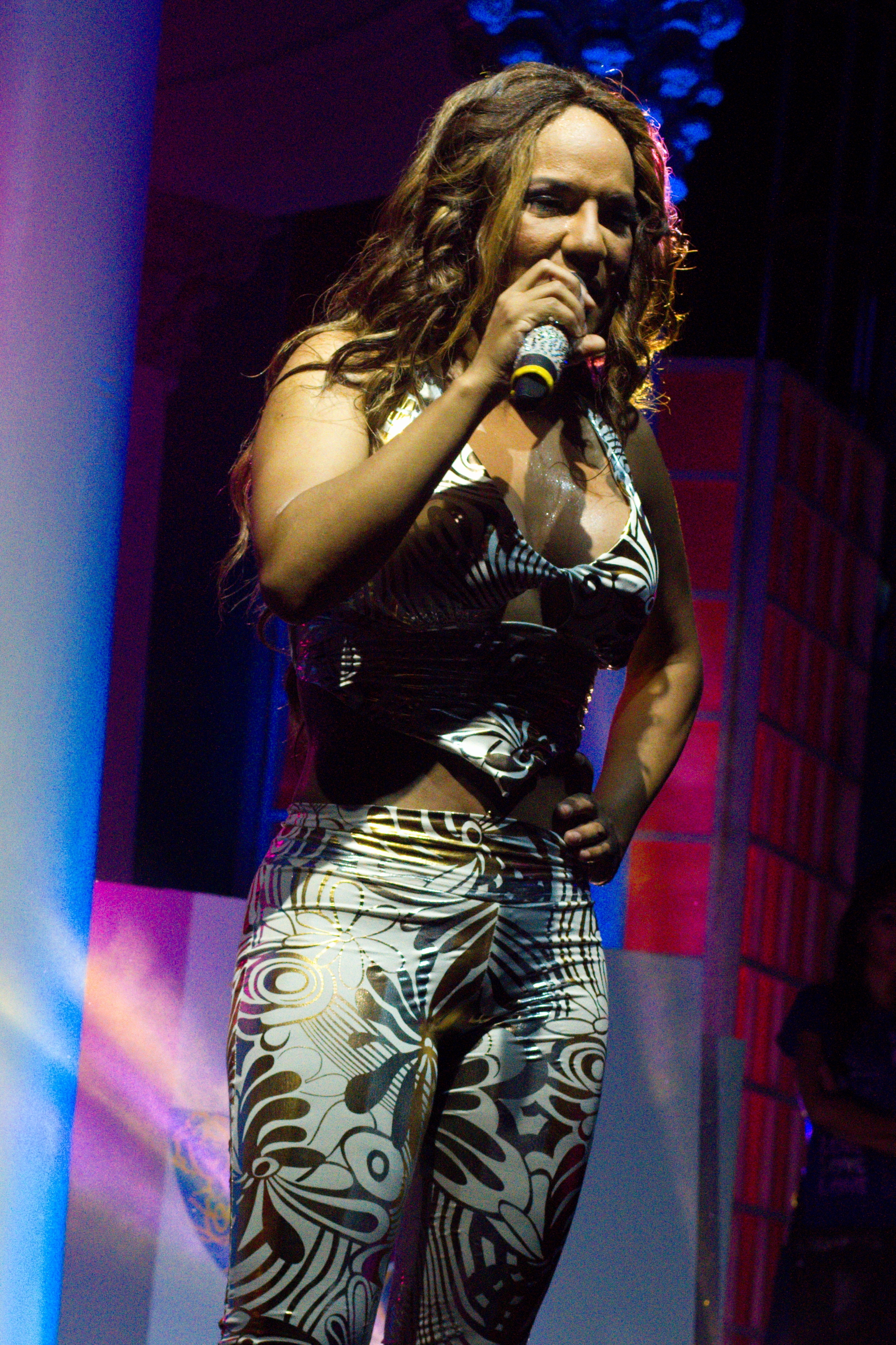
"El Swing" by Samy and Sandra Sandoval (pictured) became their sixth number-one single on the Panamanian Tropical chart, and the best-performing song of 2020 on the chart. Additionally, they extended their record for having the most weeks at number one, with 49 weeks in total.

Key
| † | Indicates best-performing single of 2020 |

| Issue date | Song | Artist | Reference |
|---|---|---|---|
| 6 January | "Parecen Viernes" | Marc Anthony | |
| 13 January | "La Mejor Versión de Mi (Remix)" | Natti Natasha and Romeo Santos | |
| 20 January | "El Swing" † | Samy and Sandra Sandoval | |
| 27 January | "El Swing" † | Samy and Sandra Sandoval | |
| 3 February | "El Swing" † | Samy and Sandra Sandoval | |
| 10 February | "El Swing" † | Samy and Sandra Sandoval | |
| 17 February | "El Swing" † | Samy and Sandra Sandoval | |
| 24 February | "El Swing" † | Samy and Sandra Sandoval | |
| 2 March | "Robarte un Beso" | Carlos Vives and Sebastián Yatra | |
| 9 March | "No Te Vayas" | Carlos Vives | |
| 16 March | "No Te Vayas" | Carlos Vives | |
| 23 March | "Robarte un Beso" | Carlos Vives and Sebastián Yatra | |
| 30 March | "No Te Vayas" | Carlos Vives | |
| 6 April | "No Te Vayas" | Carlos Vives | |
| 13 April | "No Te Vayas" | Carlos Vives | |
| 20 April | "No Te Vayas" | Carlos Vives | |
| 27 April | "No Te Vayas" | Carlos Vives | |
| 4 May | "No Te Vayas" | Carlos Vives | |
| 11 May | "No Te Vayas" | Carlos Vives | |
| 18 May | "No Te Vayas" | Carlos Vives | |
| 25 May | "Boogaloo Supreme" | Victor Manuelle featuring Wisin | |
| 1 June | "Amigos con Derecho" | Jorge and Balbino Gómez | |
| 8 June | "El Swing" † | Samy and Sandra Sandoval | |
| 15 June | "Amigos con Derecho" | Jorge and Balbino Gómez | |
| 22 June | "Boogaloo Supreme" | Victor Manuelle featuring Wisin | |
| 29 June | "La Vida da Vueltas" | Charlie Cruz | |
| 6 July | "La Vida da Vueltas" | Charlie Cruz | |
| 13 July | "Un Día Interminable" | Roberto Antonio | |
| 20 July | "Un Día Interminable" | Roberto Antonio | |
| 27 July | "Mi Propiedad Privada" | La India | |
| 3 August | "Mi Propiedad Privada" | La India | |
| 10 August | "Qué Dificil Es" | Ulpiano Vergara | |
| 17 August | "Qué Dificil Es" | Ulpiano Vergara | |
| 24 August | "Qué Dificil Es" | Ulpiano Vergara | |
| 31 August | "Qué Dificil Es" | Ulpiano Vergara | |
| 7 September | "Cuanto La Quise Yo" | Ulpiano Vergara | |
| 14 September | "Te Espero con Ansias" | Eduardo Amaya y su Sound Check | |
| 21 September | "Te Espero con Ansias" | Eduardo Amaya y su Sound Check | |
| 28 September | "Te Espero con Ansias" | Eduardo Amaya y su Sound Check | |
| 5 October | "Qué Dificil Es" | Ulpiano Vergara | |
| 12 October | "Cuanto La Quise Yo" | Ulpiano Vergara | |
| 19 October | "Me Enamoré como Nunca" | N'Klabe featuring Elysanij | |
| 26 October | "Amantes por Teléfono" | Manuel and Abdiel & Los Consentidos | |
| 2 November | "Me Enamoré como Nunca" | N'Klabe featuring Elysanij | |
| 9 November | "Me Enamoré como Nunca" | N'Klabe featuring Elysanij | |
| 16 November | "Me Enamoré como Nunca" | N'Klabe featuring Elysanij | |
| 23 November | "Me Enamoré como Nunca" | N'Klabe featuring Elysanij | |
| 30 November | "Me Enamoré como Nunca" | N'Klabe featuring Elysanij | |
| 7 December | "Me Enamoré como Nunca" | N'Klabe featuring Elysanij | |
| 14 December | "De Vuelta Pa' La Vuelta" | Daddy Yankee and Marc Anthony | |
| 21 December | "De Vuelta Pa' La Vuelta" | Daddy Yankee and Marc Anthony | |
| 28 December | "De Vuelta Pa' La Vuelta" | Daddy Yankee and Marc Anthony | |
