= List of number-one tropical songs of 2017 (Panama) =

This is a list of the tropical number-one songs of 2017 in Panama. The charts are published by Monitor Latino, based exclusively for tropical songs on airplay across radio stations in Panama using the Radio Tracking Data, LLC in real time. The chart week runs from Monday to Sunday.

== Chart history ==
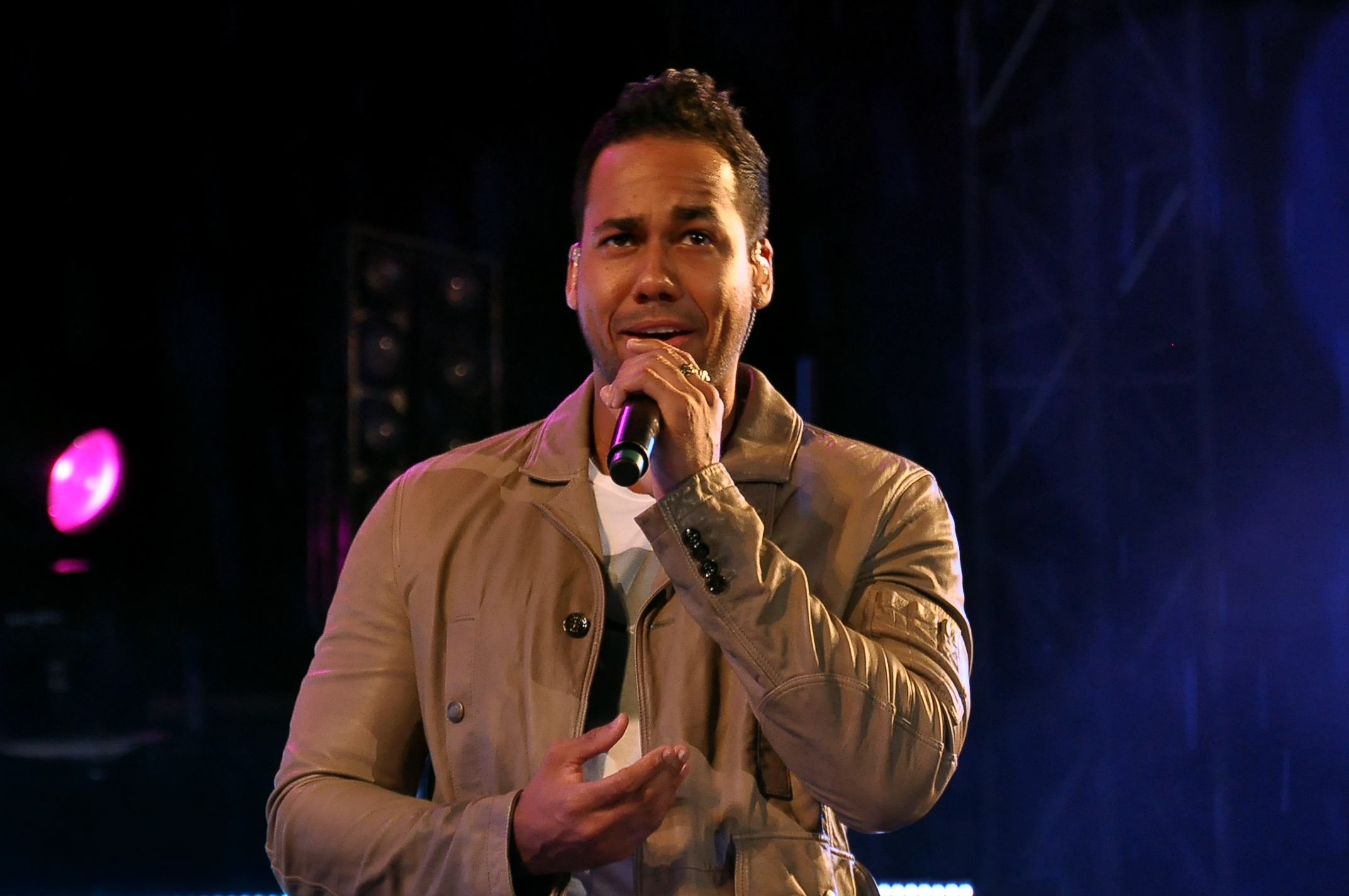
"Héroe Favorito" by Romeo Santos (pictured) became the best-performing single of 2017 on the Panamanian Tropical chart and spent 25 non-consecutive weeks at number one. He also replaced himself at number one with his next single, "Imitadora".

Key
†	Indicates best-performing single of 2017

Issue date	Song	Artist	Reference
2 January	"Esta Navidad"	Gaitanes	
9 January	"La Carretera"	Prince Royce	
16 January	"La Llamada de Mi Ex"	Chiquito Team Band	
23 January	"Me Fui Muy Lejos"	Ulpiano Vergara	
30 January	"La Llamada de Mi Ex"	Chiquito Team Band	
6 February	"La Llamada de Mi Ex"	Chiquito Team Band	
13 February	"Héroe Favorito" †	Romeo Santos	
20 February	"Héroe Favorito" †	Romeo Santos	
27 February	"Héroe Favorito" †	Romeo Santos	
6 March	"Héroe Favorito" †	Romeo Santos	
13 March	"Héroe Favorito" †	Romeo Santos	
20 March	"Héroe Favorito" †	Romeo Santos	
27 March	"Héroe Favorito" †	Romeo Santos	
3 April	"Héroe Favorito" †	Romeo Santos	
10 April	"Héroe Favorito" †	Romeo Santos	
17 April	"Héroe Favorito" †	Romeo Santos	
24 April	"Héroe Favorito" †	Romeo Santos	
1 May	"Héroe Favorito" †	Romeo Santos	
8 May	"Héroe Favorito" †	Romeo Santos	
15 May	"Héroe Favorito" †	Romeo Santos	
22 May	"Héroe Favorito" †	Romeo Santos	
29 May	"Héroe Favorito" †	Romeo Santos	
5 June	"Héroe Favorito" †	Romeo Santos	
12 June	"Deja Vu"	Prince Royce and Shakira	
19 June	"Héroe Favorito" †	Romeo Santos	
26 June	"Héroe Favorito" †	Romeo Santos	
3 July	"Deja Vu"	Prince Royce and Shakira	
10 July	"Héroe Favorito" †	Romeo Santos	
17 July	"Héroe Favorito" †	Romeo Santos	
24 July	"Héroe Favorito" †	Romeo Santos	
31 July	"Héroe Favorito" †	Romeo Santos	
7 August	"Imitadora"	Romeo Santos	
14 August	"Imitadora"	Romeo Santos	
21 August	"Héroe Favorito" †	Romeo Santos	
28 August	"Héroe Favorito" †	Romeo Santos	
4 September	"Imitadora"	Romeo Santos	
11 September	"Imitadora"	Romeo Santos	
18 September	"La Llamada de Mi Ex"	Chiquito Team Band	
25 September	"La Llamada de Mi Ex"	Chiquito Team Band	
2 October	"La Llamada de Mi Ex"	Chiquito Team Band	
9 October	"La Llamada de Mi Ex"	Chiquito Team Band	
16 October	"La Rosa de los Vientos"	El Roockie featuring Karen Peralta, Apache Ness, Osvaldo Ayala and Mecánik Informal	
23 October	"La Rosa de los Vientos"	El Roockie featuring Karen Peralta, Apache Ness, Osvaldo Ayala and Mecánik Informal	
30 October	"Patria"	Rubén Blades	
6 November	"La Rosa de los Vientos"	El Roockie featuring Karen Peralta, Apache Ness, Osvaldo Ayala and Mecánik Informal	
13 November	"La Rosa de los Vientos"	El Roockie featuring Karen Peralta, Apache Ness, Osvaldo Ayala and Mecánik Informal	
20 November	"Imitadora"	Romeo Santos	
27 November	"Aires de Navidad"	Willie Colón	
4 December	"Aires de Navidad"	Willie Colón	
11 December	"Aires de Navidad"	Willie Colón	
18 December	"Aires de Navidad"	Willie Colón	
25 December	"La Llamada de Mi Ex"	Chiquito Team Band	
