= List of number-one tropical songs of 2019 (Panama) =

This is a list of the tropical number-one songs of 2019 in Panama. The charts are published by Monitor Latino, based exclusively for tropical songs on airplay across radio stations in Panama using the Radio Tracking Data, LLC in real time. The chart week runs from Monday to Sunday.

== Chart history ==
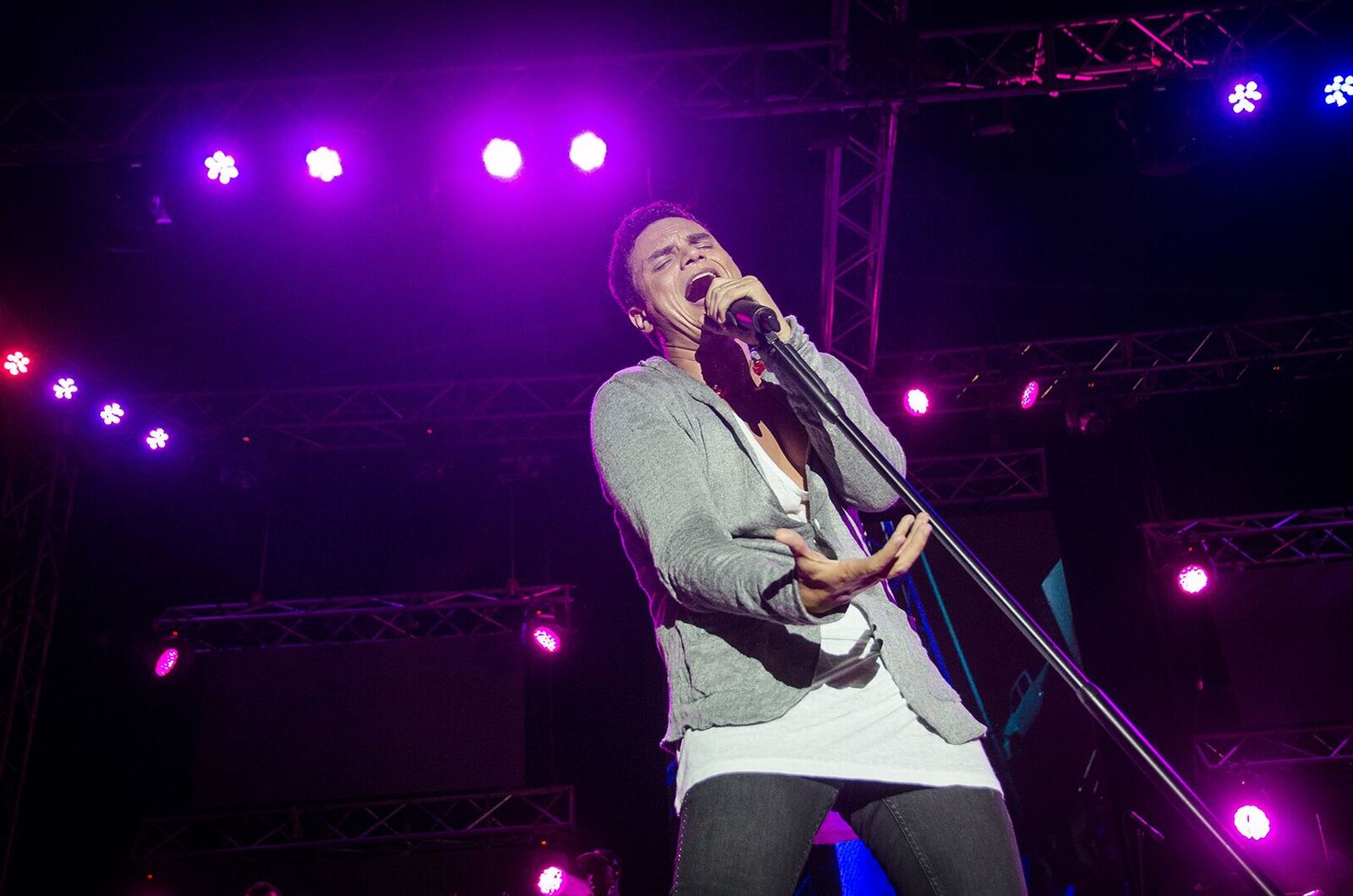
"Vivir Bailando" by Silvestre Dangond (pictured) became the best-performing single of 2019 on the Panamanian Tropical chart and spent 12 non-consecutive weeks at number one.

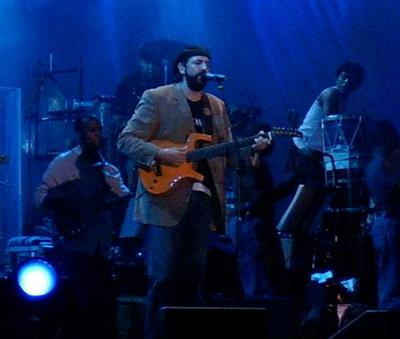
Juan Luis Guerra (pictured) scored his first number-one single on the Panamanian Tropical chart with "Kitipun".

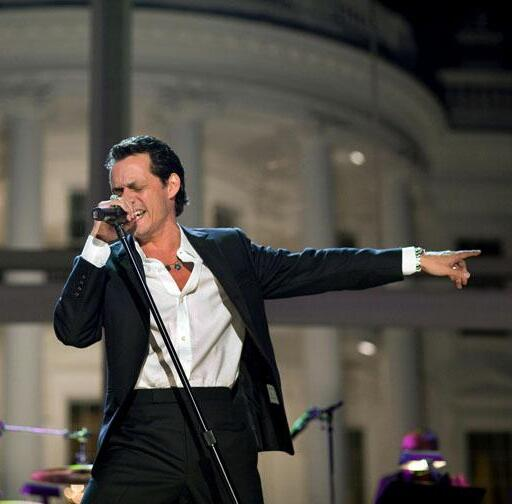
Marc Anthony (pictured) scored two number-one singles on the Panamanian Tropical chart with "Parecen Viernes" and "Tu Vida en la Mía". He also became the third act to replace itself at number one, following Romeo Santos and Samy and Sandra Sandoval.

Key
†	Indicates best-performing single of 2019

Issue date	Song	Artist	Reference
7 January	"La Patrona"	Samy and Sandra Sandoval	
14 January	"La Patrona"	Samy and Sandra Sandoval	
21 January	"Justicia"	Silvestre Dangond featuring Natti Natasha	
28 January	"La Araña"	Real Phantom featuring Osvaldo Ayala	
4 February	"La Araña"	Real Phantom featuring Osvaldo Ayala	
11 February	"Te Pica y Te Duele"	Samy and Sandra Sandoval	
18 February	"Te Pica y Te Duele"	Samy and Sandra Sandoval	
25 February	"Te Pica y Te Duele"	Samy and Sandra Sandoval	
4 March	"Te Pica y Te Duele"	Samy and Sandra Sandoval	
11 March	"Vivir Bailando" †	Silvestre Dangond and Maluma	
18 March	"Vivir Bailando" †	Silvestre Dangond and Maluma	
25 March	"Vivir Bailando" †	Silvestre Dangond and Maluma	
1 April	"Vivir Bailando" †	Silvestre Dangond and Maluma	
8 April	"Vivir Bailando" †	Silvestre Dangond and Maluma	
15 April	"Vivir Bailando" †	Silvestre Dangond and Maluma	
22 April	"Vivir Bailando" †	Silvestre Dangond and Maluma	
29 April	"Vivir Bailando" †	Silvestre Dangond and Maluma	
6 May	"Kitipun"	Juan Luis Guerra	
13 May	"Vivir Bailando" †	Silvestre Dangond and Maluma	
20 May	"Vivir Bailando" †	Silvestre Dangond and Maluma	
27 May	"Vivir Bailando" †	Silvestre Dangond and Maluma	
3 June	"Si Me Das tu Amor"	Carlos Vives featuring Wisin	
10 June	"Si Me Das tu Amor"	Carlos Vives featuring Wisin	
17 June	"Vivir Bailando" †	Silvestre Dangond and Maluma	
24 June	"Si Me Das tu Amor"	Carlos Vives featuring Wisin	
1 July	"Si Me Das tu Amor"	Carlos Vives featuring Wisin	
8 July	"Si Me Das tu Amor"	Carlos Vives featuring Wisin	
15 July	"Si Me Das tu Amor"	Carlos Vives featuring Wisin	
22 July	"Si Me Das tu Amor"	Carlos Vives featuring Wisin	
29 July	"Me Olvidé de Mi"	Manuel and Abdiel & Los Consentidos	
5 August	"Si Me Das tu Amor"	Carlos Vives featuring Wisin	
12 August	"Si Me Das tu Amor"	Carlos Vives featuring Wisin	
19 August	"Si Me Das tu Amor"	Carlos Vives featuring Wisin	
26 August	"Me Olvidé de Mi"	Manuel and Abdiel & Los Consentidos	
2 September	"Me Olvidé de Mi"	Manuel and Abdiel & Los Consentidos	
9 September	"Me Olvidé de Mi"	Manuel and Abdiel & Los Consentidos	
16 September	"Kitipun"	Juan Luis Guerra	
23 September	"Corazón de Acero"	Yiyo Sarante	
30 September	"Si Me Das tu Amor"	Carlos Vives featuring Wisin	
7 October	"Corazón de Acero"	Yiyo Sarante	
14 October	"Me Olvidé de Mi"	Manuel and Abdiel & Los Consentidos	
21 October	"Corazón de Acero"	Yiyo Sarante	
28 October	"Patria"	Rubén Blades	
4 November	"Parecen Viernes"	Marc Anthony	
11 November	"Parecen Viernes"	Marc Anthony	
18 November	"Parecen Viernes"	Marc Anthony	
25 November	"Tu Vida en la Mía"	Marc Anthony	
2 December	"Aires de Navidad"	Willie Colón	
9 December	"Aires de Navidad"	Willie Colón	
16 December	"No Hay Cama Pa Tanta Gente"	El Gran Combo de Puerto Rico	
23 December	"Pa La Gente Panameña"	Cheo Feliciano	
30 December	"Parecen Viernes"	Marc Anthony	
