= Mi Diario =

- Type: Daily newspaper
- Format: Tabloid
- Owner(s): Corporación La Prensa
- Founded: 2003
- Language: Spanish
- Headquarters: Calle C Hato Pintado, Panama City
- Website: www.midiario.com/

Mi Diario (My Diary) is a Spanish-language daily newspaper published in Panama City, Panama.
