= List of number-one urban songs of 2016 (Panama) =

This is a list of the urban number-one songs of 2016 in Panama. The charts are published by Monitor Latino, based exclusively for urban singles on airplay across radio stations in Panama using the Radio Tracking Data, LLC in real time. The chart week runs from Monday to Sunday.

== Chart history ==
Issue date	Song	Artist	Reference
12 December	"Safari"	J Balvin featuring Pharrell Williams, Bia and Sky	
19 December	"Safari"	J Balvin featuring Pharrell Williams, Bia and Sky	
26 December	"Safari"	J Balvin featuring Pharrell Williams, Bia and Sky	
