= List of number-one tropical songs of 2016 (Panama) =

This is a list of the tropical number-one songs of 2016 in Panama. The charts are published by Monitor Latino, based exclusively for tropical songs on airplay across radio stations in Panama using the Radio Tracking Data, LLC in real time. The chart week runs from Monday to Sunday.

== Chart history ==
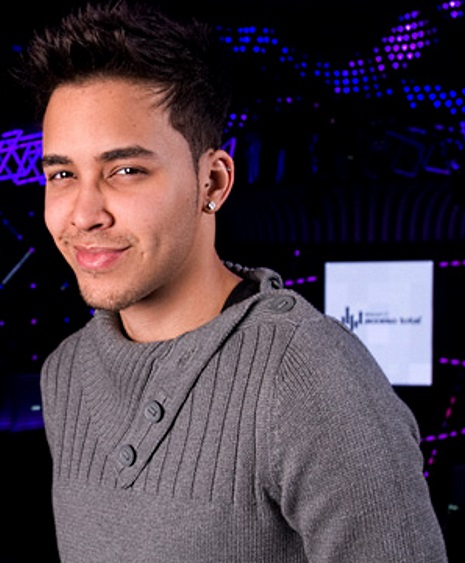
"La Carretera" by Prince Royce (pictured) became the first number-one single on the Panamanian Tropical chart.

Issue date	Song	Artist	Reference
5 December	"La Carretera"	Prince Royce	
12 December	"La Carretera"	Prince Royce	
19 December	"Esta Navidad"	Gaitanes	
26 December	"Esta Navidad"	Gaitanes	
