= Carmen A. Miró =

Panamanian sociologist, statistician, and demographer (1919–2022)

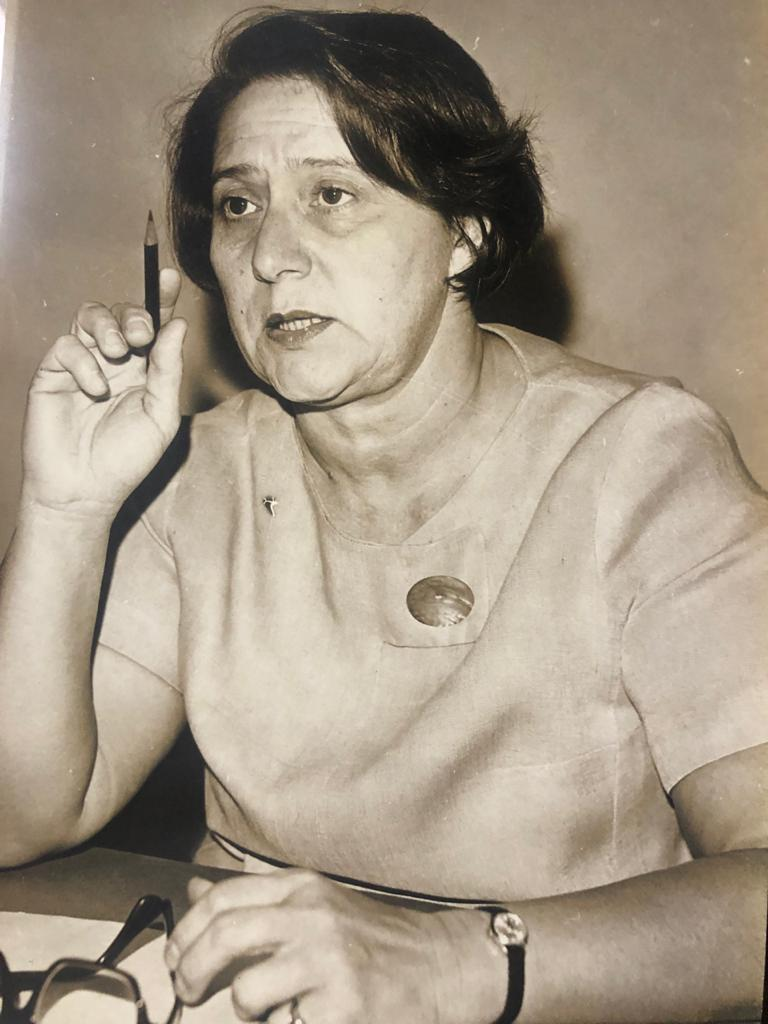
- Born: 19 April 1919; Panama
- Died: 18 September 2022 (aged 103)
- Education: University of Panama; London School of Economics
- Occupations: Sociologist, statistician, demographer
- Father: Ricardo Miró
- Awards: Elected Fellow of the American Statistical Association

Carmen A. Miró (19 April 1919 – 18 September 2022) was a Panamanian sociologist, statistician, and demographer. She has been called Latin America's top expert in population, and "probably the most outstanding figure that the Panamanian social sciences have produced".

== Life and career ==
Miró was the daughter of poet Ricardo Miró. She studied business at the University of Panama, and went on to graduate studies at the London School of Economics.

From 1946 to 1956, she headed the Panamanian Department of Statistics and the Census. During this time she was also a professor of statistics at the University of Panama. In 1957 she became the founding director of the Center for Latin American Studies of Demography of the United Nations (CELADE), now the Population Division of the United Nations Economic Commission for Latin America and the Caribbean. She continued to direct CELADE until 1976. After four years at El Colegio de México she returned to Panama, where she became affiliated with the Centro de Estudios Latinoamericanos (CELA) "Justo Arosemena".

In 1984, she stood for election as vice president of Panama, but was unsuccessful. Miró turned 100 in April 2019, and died on 18 September 2022, at the age of 103.

== Recognition ==
In 1953, Miró was elected as a Fellow of the American Statistical Association "for her many contributions to the greater effectiveness of the recent Censuses of the Americas" and for creating "a comprehensive and useful statistical system for her country".

Miró has honorary doctorates from the University of Havana, from the National University of Córdoba, and from the Latin American Social Sciences Institute. In 1984 she won the United Nations World Population Prize. In 2016 El Colegio de México gave her their Daniel Cosío Villegas Prize.

An anthology of her collected writings was published in 2015.
