= List of number-one pop songs of 2016 (Panama) =

This is a list of the pop number-one songs of 2016 in Panama. The charts are published by Monitor Latino, based exclusively for pop songs on airplay across radio stations in Panama using the Radio Tracking Data, LLC in real time. The chart week runs from Monday to Sunday.

== Chart history ==
Issue date	Song	Artist	Reference
5 December	"Vente Pa' Ca"	Ricky Martin featuring Maluma	
12 December	"Vente Pa' Ca"	Ricky Martin featuring Maluma	
19 December	"Vente Pa' Ca"	Ricky Martin featuring Maluma	
26 December	"Vente Pa' Ca"	Ricky Martin featuring Maluma	
