= Melitón Sánchez Rivas =

Panamanian finance manager and sports official (1934–2026)

Rivas c. 2020

Melitón Sánchez Rivas (8 November 1934 – 15 February 2026) was a Panamanian finance manager and sports official. He was born on 8 November 1934. He played baseball and softball. On 23 January 2013, he met Gunilla Lindberg, ANOC Secretary General, and Javier Filemón Tejeira Pulido, Director General of Pandeportes (Panamanian Institute of Sports).

== Accountancy career ==
Sánchez Rivas was a certified public accountant. He was the founder and general manager of the accounting/consultation firm Sánchez Rivas Associates. He was also the accounting director of the import/export company Sánchez Rivas Associates. Sánchez Rivas was the accounting director of Venpana, S.A. (Intl. Bank at Colon Free Zone), the controller and accounting director of Grupo Biskayna, S.A. and was the International Accounting Services Consultant.

== Sports career ==
Sánchez Rivas was an organizer of B2B Softball Leagues, and director of Baseball and Softball leagues from 1965 to 1975. He was Treasurer of the Panamanian National Olympic Committee from 1972 to 1980, then President from 1982 to 2007. In 2007 he became Honorary President for Life of the Panamanian National Olympic Committee. He was President of the Panamanian Softball Federation from 1972 to 2010.He was Chef de Mission at the 1972 Games of the XX Olympiad in Munich, the 1976 Games of the XXI Olympiad in Montreal, the 1974 Central American and Caribbean Games in Santo Domingo, 1978 in Medellín, 1982 in Havana, 1975 in Pan-American Games in Mexico City, and 1979 in San Juan.

From 1981 to 1988, he was president of the Central American and Caribbean Softball Confederation (CONCACAS). In 1984 to 2000, he was vice-president for the Latin America Softball Federation (ISF). From 1990 to 2008, he was President of the Bolivarian Sports Organization (ODEBO), where he also held the position of Treasurer from 1988 to 1990. From 1988 to 1998 he was Treasurer of the Pan-American Sport Organization (PASO), where he also was executive board member from 1998 to 2008. 1996 to 2008, Sánchez Rivas was president of the Panamanian Olympic Academy, and from 2001 to 2010 he was president of the Central American Sports Organization (OREDECA).Sánchez Rivas was a member of the International Olympic Committee (IOC) from 1998 to 2014, then became an honorary member in 2015. He was also a member of the Women and Sport Commission from 2002 to 2015, as well as the Culture and Olympic Education Commission from 2006 to 2015.

== Death ==
Sánchez Rivas died on 15 February 2026, at the age of 91.

== Awards ==
- Trophy Mártires de Barbado from the State Council of the Cuban Republic
- Order of Merit: Association of National Olympic Committees (ANOC), PASO ORDECA
- (1991) elected to the Hall of Fame of the International Softball Federation (ISF)
- Keys to the cities of Caracas (Venezuela), Cochabamba (Bolivia) and Panama City (Panama)
- Order of Merit, Guatemala National Olympic Committee (2014) Olympic Order, Silver
