= Diógenes Vergara =

Panamanian politician (1970–2021)

Diógenes Vergara (10 August 1970 – 9 February 2021) was a Panamanian politician who served as a Deputy for Partido Revolucionario Democrático. He was shot and killed by gunmen in February 2021.
