= Rufina Alfaro =

Panamanian independence movement figure

Rufina Alfaro is a possibly legendary figure in the Panamanian independence movement. According to legend, she led a march on November 10, 1821 that resulted in the population of Los Santos rising up against Spanish rulers. Although even her existence is disputed, Alfaro is part of popular memory and even is an official symbol of Panama.

== Biography ==
Rufina Alfaro is said to have had black hair and eyes, tanned skin, and she was tall and thin. An account stated that she was born in the Caserio de Las Peñas, in the district of Los Santos. The date of her birth is unknown, but she is said to have lived with her parents, and that they were in the business of raising chickens for sale and agriculture. She knew how to read and write and dressed in basquiña, common dress typical of that time. Her village was two miles away from Los Santos and she worked selling eggs and vegetables in the village.

At age 22, Alfaro gained prominence by helping to develop a plan to seize the local police fortress, the only breadwinner of the Spanish colonial government. Alfaro had won the sympathy of the Spanish soldiers, because in addition to her beauty, she was distinguished by her fine manners and cheerful talk which allowed her entry into the elegant salons of society. Yet she knew the deep popular resentment against the Crown and that was what convinced her that she should act to support the quest for independence. In that time of government suppression, the press was muzzled and Panamanians who talked about freedom were threatened. The head of the barracks, who had fallen in love with Alfaro, allowed her the entrance to the hall to chat, but she used these meetings to obtain information. She felt sympathy for the soldier, related Horacio Moreno in the Journal Lottery, but suppressed those feelings to help secure the freedom of her people.

One day in November 1821, she told the people organizing for independence that the Spanish soldiers were cleaning their weapons, and rather than go out and sell as was her custom, she joined the improvised group of soldiers, to lead a march in which she shouted "Viva la Libertad" (Long Live Liberty). Armed with stones and sticks the people captured the barracks and seized the weapons. At dawn of November 10, 1821, they had already achieved their desired freedom, without spilling a single drop of blood.

Some people deny that Alfaro existed and suggest that she was the product of the popular imagination, and the issue has even been debated in the national parliament.

== Legacy ==
November 10 is an official public holiday in Panama. A monument in Alfaro's memory, sculpted by Jose Guillermo Mora Noli, was erected in the town of La Villa de los Santos, and at the celebration of the Independence Day in 2002, President Mireya Moscoso deposited a wreath in front of the bust of the heroine. There is also a corregimiento named in her honour in Panama's San Miguelito District.
