= Independence of Panama from Spain =

Independence after 1821 revolt

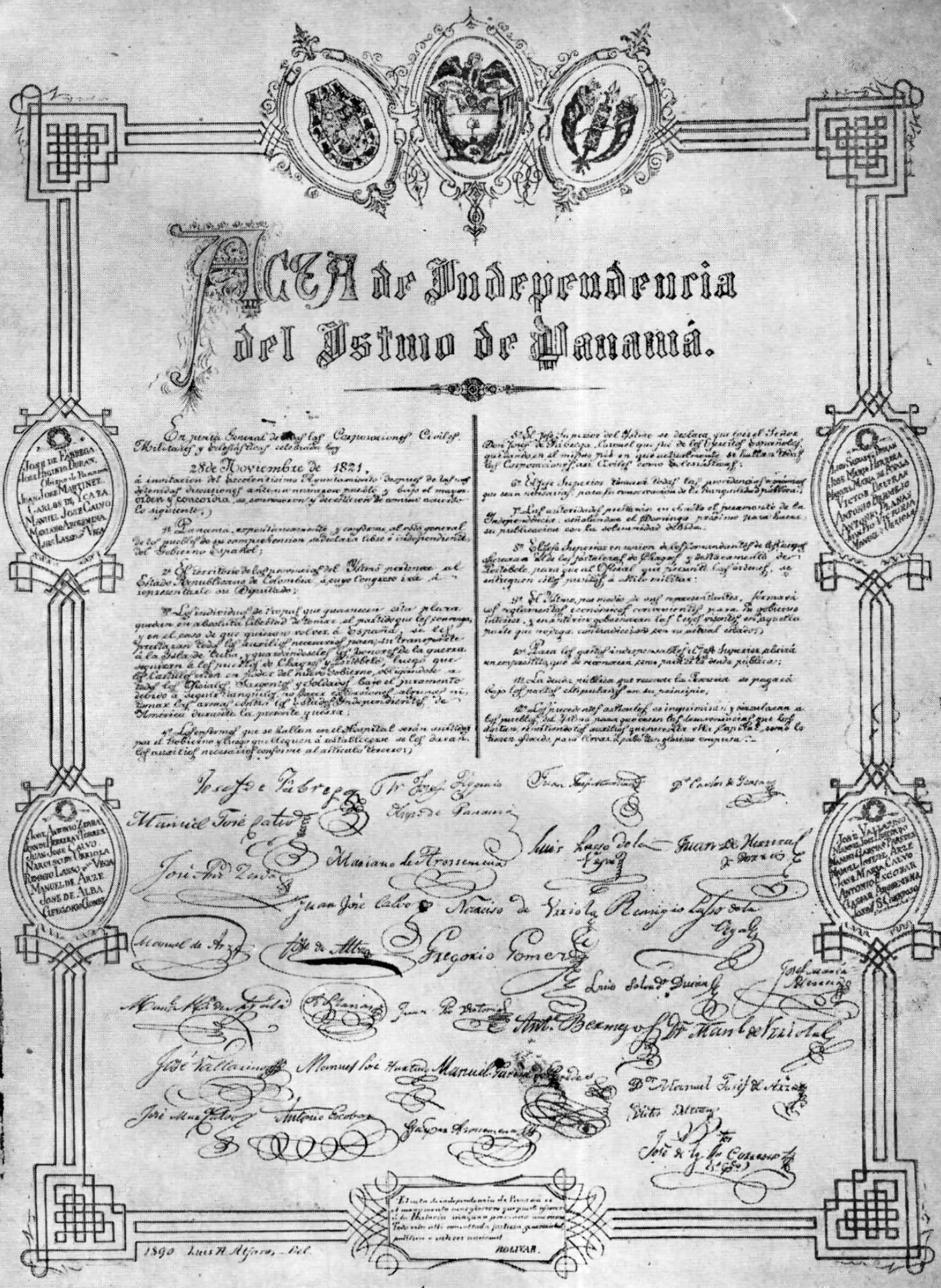
- Date: 10 November 1821 to 28 November 1821
- Location: Panama
- Goals: Independence of Panama
- Methods: Bloodless revolution
- Result: Joining the Republic of Gran Colombia

Lead figures
José de Fábrega	

Casualties
- Death: 0

Independence of Panama from Spain was accomplished through a bloodless revolt between 10 November 1821 and 28 November 1821. Seizing the opportunity, when the Spanish governor left Panama to march on rebellious Ecuadorians, José de Fábrega led a push for independence. Rebels in the small town of Villa de Los Santos made the first declaration for independence and the movement quickly spread to the capital. Fearing that Spain would retake the country, the rebels quickly joined the Republic of Gran Colombia.

== History ==
Initial attempts to free Panama from Spain came from South American liberators, not Panamanians, who saw Panama as a strategic link, both politically and militarily between South America and the Central American states. As early as 1787, Venezuelan Francisco de Miranda attempted to interest the British in a canal project in Panama to increase trade for Britain, in exchange for military support to bolster South American independence hopes. The attack by Napoleon, who deposed the Spanish monarch in 1807, led to the push for independence throughout South America by Simón Bolivar. Though Bolivar did not set foot in Panama, he advocated for independence, declaring in his 1815 "Letter from Jamaica" that the independence of Panama would lead to commerce opportunities. In 1819 the Scotsman Gregor MacGregor led a failed attempt to free Panama.

When South American revolutionary zeal deposed Viceroyalty of New Granada Juan de la Cruz Mourgeón, he fled to Panama and was declared governor. Mourgeón was ordered to Ecuador to fight the separatists and appointed José de Fábrega as his successor. As soon as Mourgeón sailed, Fábrega seized the moment for Panama's independence.

On 10 November 1821, the first call for independence was made in the small provincial town of Villa de los Santos. Called the "Primer Grito de Independencia de la Villa de Los Santos" (Shout for Independence), it ignited rebels throughout the Panamanian countryside. Using bribes to quell resistance from the Spanish troops and garner their desertion, the rebels gained control of Panama City without bloodshed. On November 20, 1821, Fábrega proclaimed Panamanian independence in Panama City. An open meeting was held with merchants, landowners, and elites, who fearing retaliation from Spain and interruption of trade decided to join the Republic of Gran Colombia and drafted the Independence Act of Panama.
