= COVID-19 pandemic in Panama =

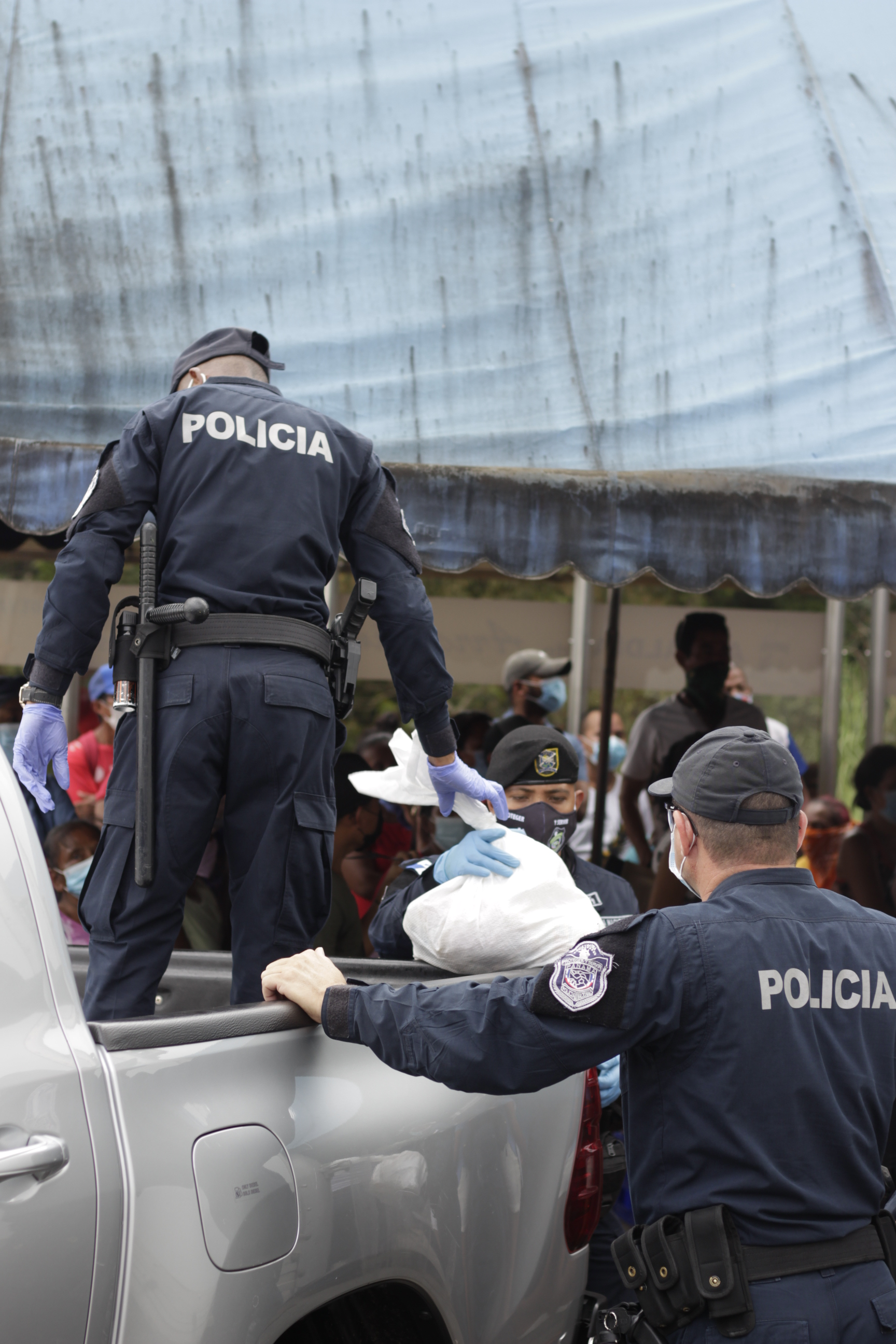
- Disease: COVID-19
- Pathogen: SARS-CoV-2
- Location: Panama
- First outbreak: Wuhan, Hubei, China
- Index case: Tocumen International Airport
- Arrival date: 9 March 2020 (6 years, 7 months, 2 weeks and 4 days)
- Confirmed cases: 1,045,788
- Active cases: 2,841
- Recovered: 468,838
- Deaths: 8,843
- Fatality rate: 0.85%
- Vaccinations: 3,746,041 (total vaccinated); 3,178,700 (fully vaccinated); 9,201,276 (doses administered)

The COVID-19 pandemic in Panama was a part of the worldwide pandemic of the coronavirus disease (COVID-19) caused by severe acute respiratory syndrome coronavirus 2 (SARS-CoV-2). The virus was confirmed to have spread to Panama on 9 March 2020. One of the dead was a 64-year-old male, who also had diabetes and pneumonia. Of those infected, 83 were hospitalized. The infected individuals belonged to the 29-59 age group and had each recently travelled abroad. A 13-year-old girl died of COVID-19 on 23 March 2020.

The government declared a state of emergency on 13 March 2020. The move freed US$50 million for a period of 180 days to purchase goods and services to combat COVID-19.

A gender-based quarantine system was established, where only women were allowed to leave their homes on some days and only men were allowed out on other days. The quarantine system allowed police to easily tell whether someone was violating their quarantine. However, the plan led to harassment of transgender and non-binary people.

== Background ==
On 12 January 2020, the World Health Organization (WHO) confirmed that a novel coronavirus was the cause of a respiratory illness in a cluster of people in Wuhan, Hubei, China, which was reported to the WHO on 31 December 2019.

The case fatality ratio for COVID-19 has been much lower than SARS of 2003, but the transmission has been significantly greater, with a significant total death toll.

On 16 December 2020, Panama approved the Pfizer–BioNTech COVID-19 vaccine, which is scheduled for administration in the first trimester of 2021.

== Timeline ==
Cases

Deaths

== Statistics ==
=== Charts ===
==== Daily New Confirmed Cases ====
View source data.

==== Daily New Deaths ====
View source data.

== Vaccination ==
The vaccination plan against COVID-19 in Panama consists of four phases: (1) includes health workers frontline workers, adults over 60 years of age, people over 16 years of age with a disability, (2) people over 60 years of age and the population between 16 and 59 years old with chronic diseases, teachers and administrators from schools and universities, kindergarten staff, (3) population of the regions and areas of difficult access, drivers of public transport and cargo and airport, customs and immigration personnel, (4) people aged 16 to 59 years without chronic diseases. Panama has been one of the leading countries concerning the vaccination against COVID-19. By the end of May 2021, Panama has administered 21,90 doses per 100 people, that is 959,588 doses total. Indeed, Panama has contracted 11.1 million vaccine doses which covers 128,5% of the population. Panama has purchased seven million doses of the BioNTech/Pfizer vaccine, three million doses of the Sputnik V vaccine and 1.1 million doses of the AstraZeneca/Oxford vaccine of which 110,000 doses have reached the country through the COVAX mechanism, a global initiative that aims at equitable access to COVID-19 vaccines. In spite of intact diplomatic ties with China, Panama has turned down deals to contract Chinese vaccines while other Latin American countries rely on deals and donations of the Chinese immunizer.

== See also ==
- COVID-19 pandemic in North America
- COVID-19 pandemic by country
- 2020 in Central America
- History of smallpox in Mexico
- HIV/AIDS in Latin America
- 2013–2014 chikungunya outbreak
- 2009 swine flu pandemic
- 2019–2020 dengue fever epidemic
