= José Gabriel Carrizo =

Panamanian politician

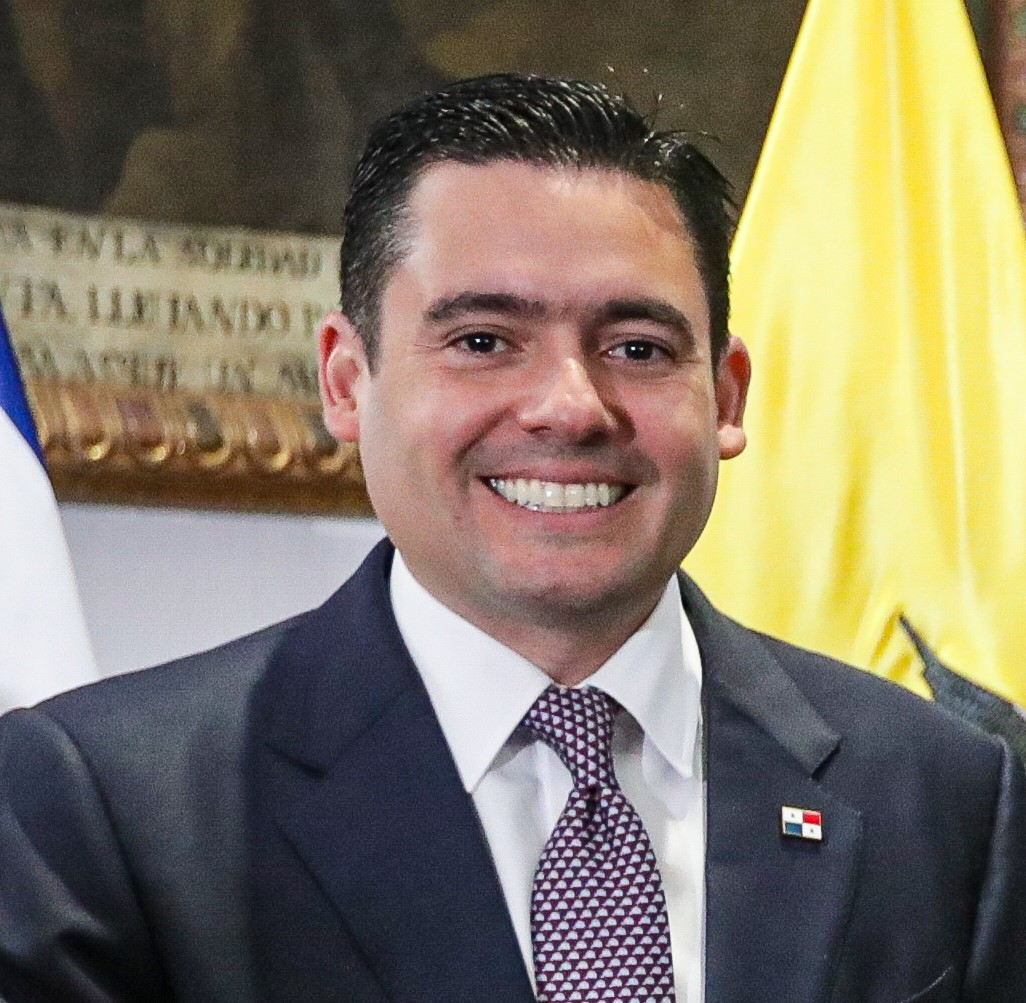
- Carrizo in 2023

Vice President of Panama
- In office 1 July 2019 – 1 July 2024
- President: Laurentino Cortizo
- Preceded by: Isabel Saint Malo
- Succeeded by: Vacant

Personal details
- Born: 25 June 1983 (age 42) Penonomé, Coclé, Panama
- Political party: Democratic Revolutionary
- Spouse: Julieta Spiegel
- Children: 3

José Gabriel Carrizo Jaén (born 25 June 1983) is a Panamanian businessman and politician who served as Vice President of Panama from 2019 to 2024, under President Laurentino Cortizo. He unsuccessfully ran for president in the 2024 election.

== Early life and education ==
José Gabriel Carrizo Jaén was born in Panama City, Panama, on 25 June 1983. He graduated from Universidad Católica Santa María La Antigua with a degree in law and political science.

== Career ==
Carrizo's family has links to the hotel, meat, and dairy industries and he is involved in gold mining in Petaquilla. His family has construction and livestock businesses. He started working as a lawyer in 2005. He was a delegate to the congress of the Democratic Revolutionary Party (PRD) in 2012 and 2016.

On 2 February 2019, Laurentino Cortizo, the presidential nominee of the PRD, announced Carrizo as his vice-presidential running mate in the 2019 election. Carrizo donated $99,000 to Cortizo's campaign during the primary and was obscure in the field of politics.

Carrizo was Minister of the Presidency until his resignation on 1 February 2023.

Carrizo won the PRD's presidential nomination for the 2024 election and selected José Isabel Blandón Figueroa as his vice-presidential running mate. He lost the election to José Raúl Mulino. Attorney General Javier Caraballo launched an investigation into Carrizo after two complaints were filed against him, with one of the allegations being his use of a National Aeronaval Service helicopter during his presidential campaign.

Carrizo requested that the Central American Parliament swear him in as a member on 18 October 2025, but the organisation declined to do so.

== Personal life ==
Carrizo married Julieta Spiegel, with whom he had three children. He is a member of the Catholic Church.

== Works cited ==
=== News ===
- "Last-minute candidate José Raúl Mulino wins Panama's presidential election". NPR. 6 May 2024. Archived from the original on 27 June 2025.
- "Perfil: José Gabriel Carrizo, compañero de Cortizo para la presidencia". TVN. 2 February 2019. Archived from the original on 24 May 2021.
- Aparicio, Gustavo (17 September 2023). "Eligen a Camilo Alleyne como vicepresidente de la alianza PRD- Molirena". La Estrella de Panamá. Archived from the original on 9 May 2024.
- Cruz, Omar (1 February 2023). "José Gabriel Carrizo Jaén renuncia al cargo de ministro de la Presidencia". TVN. Archived from the original on 27 June 2025.
- Cruz, Omar (28 October 2024). "Procurador Caraballo iniciará investigación contra exvicepresidente Carrizo". TVN. Archived from the original on 27 June 2025.
- Martinez, Juan (12 June 2023). "Panamanian Vice President José Carrizo secures PRD's presidential candidacy for 2". The Rio Times. Archived from the original on 27 June 2025.
- Yim, Yassinet (1 July 2019). "Perfil de José Gabriel Carrizo". Mi Diario. Archived from the original on 7 February 2022.

=== Web ===
- "Vice President of the Republic". Ministry of Social Development. Archived from the original on 27 June 2025.
