= Elections in Panama =

Panama elects on national level a head of state, i.e. the president, and a legislature. The president and the vice-president are elected on one ballot for a five-year term by the people. The National Assembly (Asamblea Nacional) has 71 members, elected for a five-year term in single-seat and multi-seat constituencies.

== Political culture ==
Panama has a multi-party system, with numerous parties in which no one party often has a chance of gaining power alone, and parties must work with each other to form coalition governments.

== Schedule ==
=== Election ===
Position	2009	2010	2011	2012	2013	2014
Type	Presidential (May); National Congress (May); Gubernatorial (May)	None				Presidential (May); National Congress (May); Gubernatorial (May)
President and vice president	President and vice president	None				President and vice president
National Congress	All seats	None				All seats
Provinces, cities and municipalities	All positions	None				All positions

=== Inauguration ===
Position	2009	2010	2011	2012	2013	2014
Type	Presidential (July); National Congress (July); Gubernatorial (July)	None				Presidential (July); National Congress (July); Gubernatorial (July)
President and vice president	1 July	None				1 July
National Congress	1 July	None				1 July
Provinces, cities and municipalities	1 July	None				1 July

== Latest elections ==
=== President ===
Candidate	Party or alliance		Votes	%
Laurentino Cortizo	Joining Forces	Democratic Revolutionary Party	609,638	31.03
Laurentino Cortizo	Joining Forces	Nationalist Republican Liberal Movement	45,664	2.32
Laurentino Cortizo	Joining Forces	Total	655,302	33.35
Rómulo Roux	Change to Wake Up	Democratic Change	564,297	28.72
Rómulo Roux	Change to Wake Up	Alliance Party	44,706	2.28
Rómulo Roux	Change to Wake Up	Total	609,003	31.00
Ricardo Lombana	Independent		368,962	18.78
José Blandón	Panama We Can	Panameñista Party	174,113	8.86
José Blandón	Panama We Can	People's Party	38,818	1.98
José Blandón	Panama We Can	Total	212,931	10.84
Ana Matilde Gómez	Independent		93,631	4.77
Saúl Méndez	Broad Front for Democracy		13,540	0.69
Marco Ameglio	Independent		11,408	0.58
Total			1,964,777	100.00
Valid votes			1,964,777	97.58
Invalid/blank votes			48,656	2.42
Total votes			2,013,433	100.00
Registered voters/turnout			2,757,823	73.01
Source: Election Tribunal

=== National Assembly ===
Party	Votes	%	Seats	+/–
Democratic Revolutionary Party	542,105	29.99	35	+9
Democratic Change	405,798	22.45	18	–6
Panameñista Party	312,635	17.30	8	–8
Nationalist Republican Liberal Movement	92,340	5.11	5	+3
People's Party	65,028	3.60	0	–1
Alliance Party	43,670	2.42	0	–1
Broad Front for Democracy	22,711	1.26	0	0
Independents	323,153	17.88	5	+4
Total	1,807,440	100.00	71	0
Valid votes	1,807,440	92.68		
Invalid/blank votes	142,663	7.32		
Total votes	1,950,103	100.00		
Source: Tribunal Electoral

== See also ==
- Politics of Panama
