= 2019 Panamanian general election =

← 2014	5 May 2019	2024 →
- Presidential election
- Turnout: 73.01% (▼3.75pp)
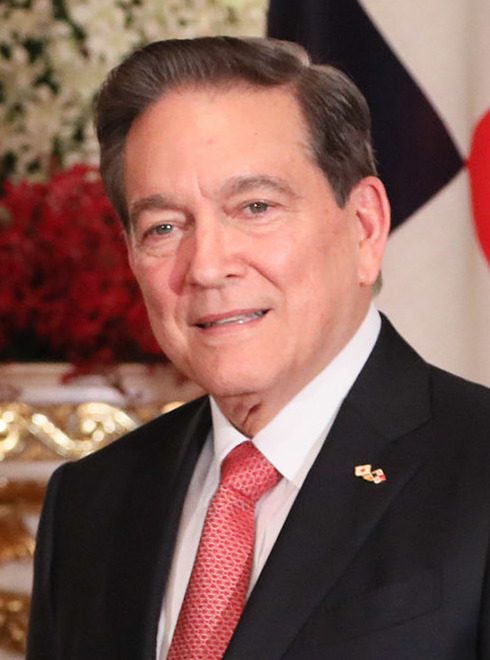

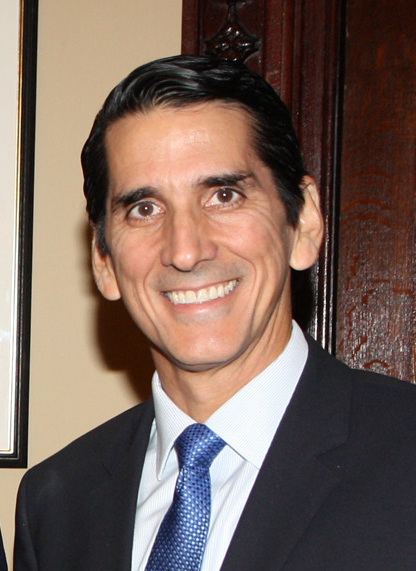

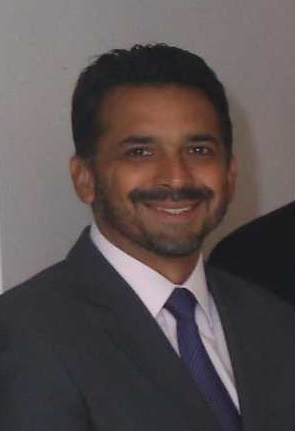

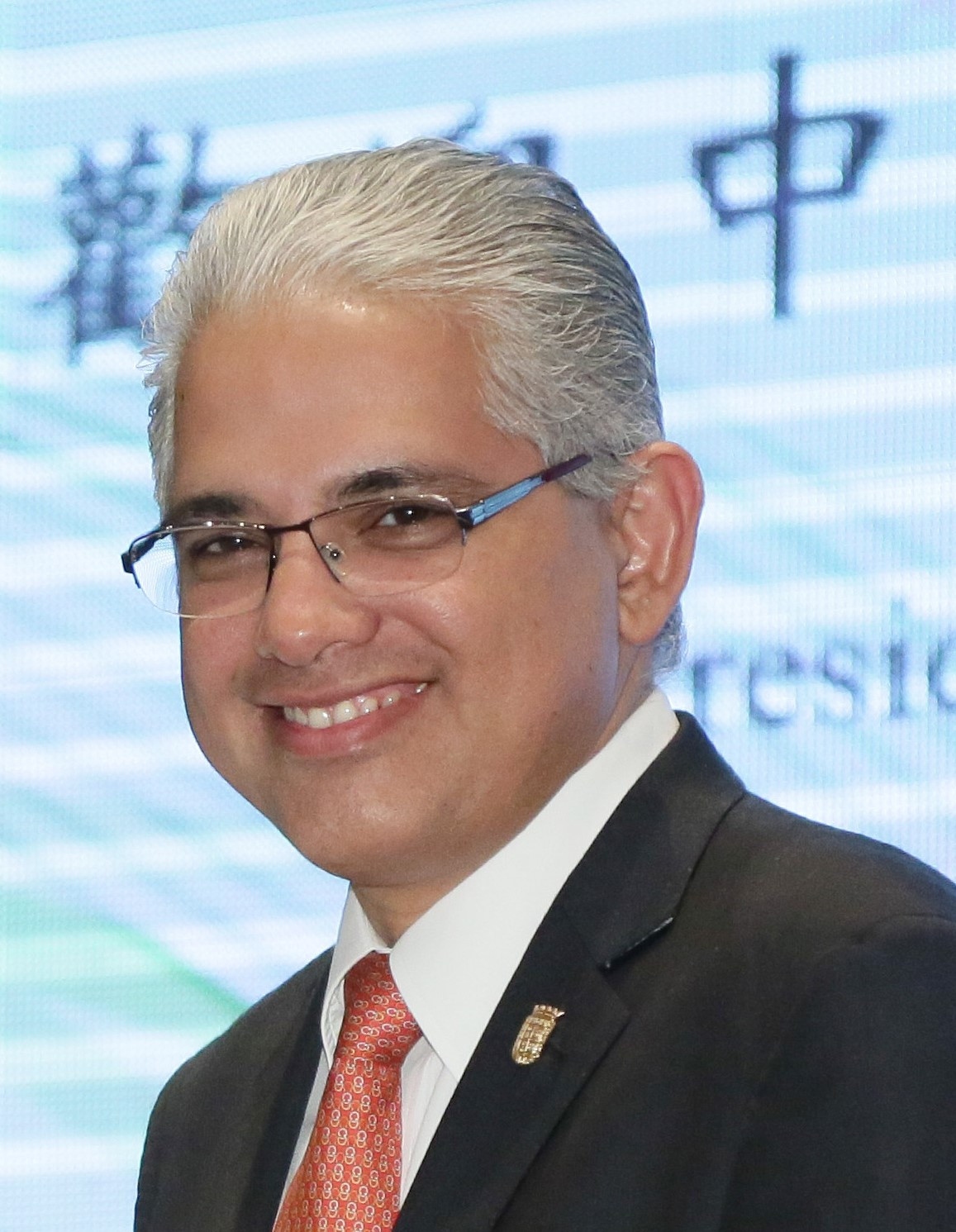
Candidate	Laurentino Cortizo	Rómulo Roux
Party	PRD	CD
Alliance	Joining Forces	Change to Wake Up
Running mate	Jose Gabriel Carrizo	Luis Casis
Popular vote	655,302	609,003
Percentage	33.35%	31.00%
Candidate	Ricardo Lombana	José Blandón
Party	Independent	Panameñista
Alliance		Panama We Can
Running mate	Guillermo Márquez	Nilda Quijano Peña
Popular vote	368,962	212,931
Percentage	18.78%	10.84%
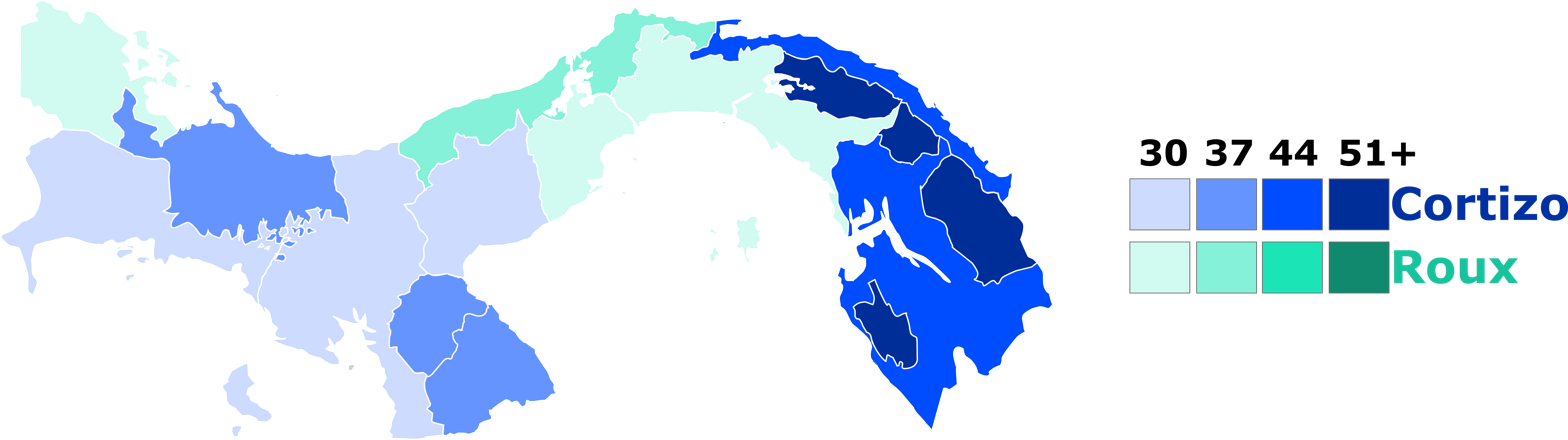
- Results by province
President before election
Juan Carlos Varela
Panameñista
Elected President
Laurentino Cortizo
PRD
- Legislative election
- All 71 seats in the National Assembly; 36 seats needed for a majority
Party	Leader	Vote %	Seats	+/–
PRD	Benicio Robinson	29.99	35	+9
CD	Rómulo Roux	22.45	18	−6
Panameñista	José Luis Varela	17.30	8	−8
MOLIRENA	Francisco Alemán	5.11	5	+3
Independents	–	17.88	5	+4
This lists parties that won seats. See the complete results below.
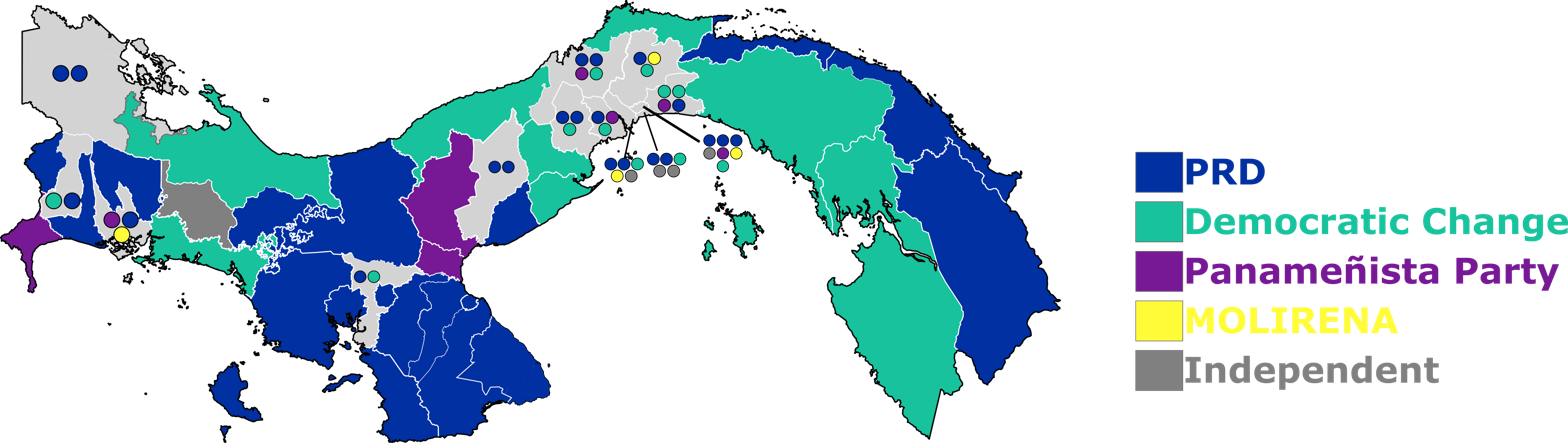
Results by circuit

General elections were held in Panama on 5 May 2019. Due to constitutional term limits, incumbent President Juan Carlos Varela was ineligible for a second consecutive term. Businessman and politician Laurentino Cortizo of the centre-left Democratic Revolutionary Party won the election with around 33% of the vote, narrowly defeating Rómulo Roux of the centre-right Democratic Change, who won 31% of the vote. The PRD also won a majority in the National Assembly. The ruling Panameñista Party of President Juan Carlos Varela suffered its worst result in history. Its candidate, Panama City mayor José Isabel Blandón, received only 11% of the vote and came in fourth behind independent candidate Ricardo Lombana. The party also lost half its seats in the National Assembly.

== Background ==
Incumbent President Juan Carlos Varela was elected in 2014 with 39% of the vote. Polls showed him to be the second most unpopular president in Latin America by 2018, with a 57% disapproval rating.

Corruption became a major issue during the campaign, being the first election held after the Panama Papers leak, which exposed the extent of the country's involvement in tax evasion. Investigations into mass bribery by the Brazilian company Odebrecht also took place during the preceding presidential term, with the presidential administrations of Martín Torrijos, Ricardo Martinelli, and Juan Carlos Varela all being subject to scrutiny. Martinelli was also investigated for wiretapping political opponents, which resulted in his being disqualified in his campaigns for Assembly deputy and Panama City mayor.

== Electoral system ==
The President was elected through plurality vote in one round.

Of the 71 members of the National Assembly, 26 were elected in single-member constituencies and 45 by proportional representation in multi-member constituencies. Each district with more than 40,000 inhabitants formed a constituency. Constituencies elected one MP for every 30,000 residents and an additional representative for every fraction over 10,000.

In single-member constituencies, MPs were elected using the first-past-the-post system. In multi-member constituencies MPs were elected using party list proportional representation according to a double quotient; the first allocation of seats used a simple quotient, further seats were allotted using the quotient divided by two, with any remaining seats are awarded to the parties with the greatest remainder.

== Presidential candidates ==
The following seven candidates contested the election:

- Laurentino "Nito" Cortizo – Democratic Revolutionary Party (PRD)
- José Isabel Blandón - Panameñista Party
- Rómulo Roux - Cambio Democrático (CD)
- Saúl Méndez - Broad Front for Democracy (FAD)
- Ana Matilde Gómez - Independent
- Marco Ameglio - Independent
- Ricardo Lombana - Independent

=== Candidate selection ===
==== Democratic Revolutionary Party ====
Nito Cortizo won the PRD's presidential primary, held on 16 September 2023. He defeated Assembly member Zulay Rodríguez and former President Ernesto Pérez Balladares. The Nationalist Republican Liberal Movement allied itself with the PRD. He selected José Gabriel Carrizo as his running mate.

==== Panameñista Party ====
Panama City mayor José Blandón won the Panameñista primary, beating former Housing Minister Mario Etchelecu. The People's Party allied itself with the Panameñista Party, maintaining the alliance that had also been seen in the 2014 elections. He selected Nilda Quijano as his running mate.

==== Democratic Change ====
Rómulo Roux, a former Canal Minister and Foreign Minister, won the CD presidential primary, defeating José Raúl Mulino, winning 68% to Mulino's 29%. He chose reporter Luis Casis as his running mate.

==== Alliance Party ====
The Alliance Party was a new political party led by Assembly member José Muñoz. José Domingo Arias, the losing CD presidential candidate in 2014, won its primary with over 90% of the vote. The party later chose to ally itself with the CD candidacy of Rómulo Roux, with Arias declining his presidential candidacy.

== Opinion polls ==
Pollster	Date	Cortizo (PRD)	Roux (CD)	Lombana (IND)
Gallup Panama	17–21 March 2019	38%	21%	4%
GAD3	29–30 April 2019	36%	26%	20%
Doxa Panamá	23–28 April 2019	30%	32%	15%
Stratmark	22–28 April 2019	44%	27%	10%

== Results ==
=== President ===
Candidate	Party or alliance		Votes	%
Laurentino Cortizo	Joining Forces	Democratic Revolutionary Party	609,638	31.03
Laurentino Cortizo	Joining Forces	Nationalist Republican Liberal Movement	45,664	2.32
Laurentino Cortizo	Joining Forces	Total	655,302	33.35
Rómulo Roux	Change to Wake Up	Democratic Change	564,297	28.72
Rómulo Roux	Change to Wake Up	Alliance Party	44,706	2.28
Rómulo Roux	Change to Wake Up	Total	609,003	31.00
Ricardo Lombana	Independent		368,962	18.78
José Blandón	Panama We Can	Panameñista Party	174,113	8.86
José Blandón	Panama We Can	People's Party	38,818	1.98
José Blandón	Panama We Can	Total	212,931	10.84
Ana Matilde Gómez	Independent		93,631	4.77
Saúl Méndez	Broad Front for Democracy		13,540	0.69
Marco Ameglio	Independent		11,408	0.58
Total			1,964,777	100.00
Valid votes			1,964,777	97.58
Invalid/blank votes			48,656	2.42
Total votes			2,013,433	100.00
Registered voters/turnout			2,757,823	73.01
Source: Election Tribunal

=== National Assembly ===
Party	Votes	%	Seats	+/–
Democratic Revolutionary Party	542,105	29.99	35	+9
Democratic Change	405,798	22.45	18	–6
Panameñista Party	312,635	17.30	8	–8
Nationalist Republican Liberal Movement	92,340	5.11	5	+3
People's Party	65,028	3.60	0	–1
Alliance Party	43,670	2.42	0	–1
Broad Front for Democracy	22,711	1.26	0	0
Independents	323,153	17.88	5	+4
Total	1,807,440	100.00	71	0
Valid votes	1,807,440	92.68		
Invalid/blank votes	142,663	7.32		
Total votes	1,950,103	100.00		
Source: Tribunal Electoral

==== Elected members ====
Constituency	Member	Party
Circuit 1-1	Benicio Robinson	Democratic Revolutionary Party
Circuit 1-1	Abel Beker	Democratic Revolutionary Party
Circuit 2-1	Néstor Guardia	Democratic Revolutionary Party
Circuit 2-1	Daniel Ramos	Democratic Revolutionary Party
Circuit 2-2	Melchor Herrera	Democratic Revolutionary Party
Circuit 2-3	Luis Ernesto Carles	Panameñista Party
Circuit 2-4	Jorge Herrera	Panameñista Party (Note: Herrera was elected but his term was served by his alternate.)
Circuit 3-1	Jairo Salazar	Democratic Revolutionary Party
Circuit 3-1	Mariano López	Democratic Revolutionary Party
Circuit 3-1	Leopoldo Benedetti	Democratic Change
Circuit 3-1	Pedro Torres	Panameñista Party
Circuit 3-2	Nelson Jackson	Democratic Change
Circuit 4-1	Fernando Arce	Democratic Revolutionary Party
Circuit 4-1	Miguel Fanovich	Nationalist Republican Liberal Movement
Circuit 4-1	Hugo Méndez	Panameñista Party
Circuit 4-2	Everardo Concepción	Panameñista Party
Circuit 4-3	Juan Esquivel	Democratic Revolutionary Party
Circuit 4-3	Rony Araúz	Democratic Change
Circuit 4-4	Gonzalo González	Democratic Revolutionary Party
Circuit 4-5	Manolo Ruiz	Nationalist Republican Liberal Movement
Circuit 4-6	Ana Giselle Rosas	Democratic Change
Circuit 5-1	Arnulfo Díaz	Democratic Change
Circuit 5-2	Jaime Vargas	Democratic Revolutionary Party
Circuit 6-1	Alejandro Castillero	Democratic Revolutionary Party
Circuit 6-2	Julio Mendoza	Democratic Revolutionary Party
Circuit 6-3	Marcos Castillero	Democratic Revolutionary Party
Circuit 7-1	Eric Broce	Democratic Revolutionary Party
Circuit 7-2	Olivares Frías	Democratic Revolutionary Party
Circuit 8-1	Kayra Harding	Democratic Revolutionary Party
Circuit 8-1	Marylín Vallarino	Democratic Change
Circuit 8-1	Yesenia Rodríguez	Panameñista Party
Circuit 8-2	Yanibel Ábrego	Democratic Change
Circuit 8-3	José Herrera	Democratic Change
Circuit 8-4	Roberto Ábrego	Democratic Revolutionary Party
Circuit 8-4	Roberto Ayala	Democratic Revolutionary Party
Circuit 8-4	Lilia Batista	Democratic Change
Circuit 8-5	Hernán Delgado	Democratic Change
Circuit 8-6	Raúl Pineda	Democratic Revolutionary Party
Circuit 8-6	Leandro Ávila	Democratic Revolutionary Party
Circuit 8-6	Zulay Rodríguez	Democratic Revolutionary Party
Circuit 8-6	Pancho Alemán	Nationalist Republican Liberal Movement
Circuit 8-6	Dalia Bernal	Democratic Change
Circuit 8-6	Itzi Atencio	Panameñista Party
Circuit 8-6	Juan Diego Vásquez	Independent
Circuit 8-7	Crispiano Adames	Democratic Revolutionary Party
Circuit 8-7	Héctor Brands	Democratic Revolutionary Party
Circuit 8-7	Corina Cano	Nationalist Republican Liberal Movement
Circuit 8-7	Sergio "Chello" Gálvez	Democratic Change
Circuit 8-7	Gabriel Silva	Independent
Circuit 8-8	Javier Sucre	Democratic Revolutionary Party
Circuit 8-8	Victor Castillo	Democratic Revolutionary Party
Circuit 8-8	Mayín Correa	Democratic Change
Circuit 8-8	Edison Broce	Independent
Circuit 8-8	Raúl Fernández	Independent
Circuit 8-9	Alina González	Democratic Revolutionary Party
Circuit 8-9	Tito Rodríguez	Nationalist Republican Liberal Movement
Circuit 8-9	Genésis Arjona	Democratic Change
Circuit 8-10	Edwin Zúñiga	Democratic Change
Circuit 8-10	Alaín Cedeño	Democratic Change
Circuit 8-10	Cenobia Vargas	Democratic Revolutionary Party
Circuit 8-10	Elías Vigil	Panameñista Party
Circuit 9-1	Luis Rafael Cruz	Democratic Revolutionary Party
Circuit 9-1	Fátima Agrazal	Democratic Change
Circuit 9-2	Ariel Alba	Democratic Revolutionary Party
Circuit 9-3	Eugenio Bernal	Democratic Revolutionary Party
Circuit 9-4	Ricardo Torres	Democratic Revolutionary Party
Circuit 10-1	Petita Ayarza	Democratic Revolutionary Party
Circuit 10-2	Arquesio Arias	Democratic Revolutionary Party
Circuit 12-1	Leopoldo Archibold	Democratic Change
Circuit 12-2	Adan Bejerano	Independent
Circuit 12-3	Ricardo Santo	Democratic Revolutionary Party
Source: Tribunal Electoral

=== Mayoral elections ===
==== Panama City ====
Candidate	Party or alliance		Votes	%
José Luis Fábrega	Joining Forces	Democratic Revolutionary Party	156,095	37.87
José Luis Fábrega	Joining Forces	Nationalist Republican Liberal Movement	19,260	4.67
José Luis Fábrega	Joining Forces	Total	175,355	42.55
Sergio Gálvez	Change to Wake Up	Democratic Change	117,476	28.50
Sergio Gálvez	Change to Wake Up	Alliance Party	11,343	2.75
Sergio Gálvez	Change to Wake Up	Total	128,819	31.25
Raúl Ricardo Rodriguez	Independent		56,638	13.74
Adolfo Valderrama	Panama We Can	Panameñista Party	32,962	8.00
Adolfo Valderrama	Panama We Can	People's Party	10,302	2.50
Adolfo Valderrama	Panama We Can	Total	43,264	10.50
Diogenes Sanchez	Broad Front for Democracy		8,081	1.96
Total			412,157	100.00
Valid votes			412,157	94.37
Invalid/blank votes			24,595	5.63
Total votes			436,752	100.00
Source: Election Tribunal

==== San Miguelito ====
Candidate	Party or alliance		Votes	%
Hector Carrasquilla	Change to Wake Up	Democratic Change	51,664	33.56
Hector Carrasquilla	Change to Wake Up	Alliance Party	5,872	3.81
Hector Carrasquilla	Change to Wake Up	Total	57,536	37.38
Cesar Sanjur	Joining Forces	Democratic Revolutionary Party	36,693	23.84
Cesar Sanjur	Joining Forces	Nationalist Republican Liberal Movement	5,456	3.54
Cesar Sanjur	Joining Forces	Total	42,149	27.38
Gerald Cumberbatch	Panama We Can	Independent	12,875	8.36
Gerald Cumberbatch	Panama We Can	Panameñista Party	9,275	6.03
Gerald Cumberbatch	Panama We Can	Total	22,150	14.39
Jacqueline Hurtado	People's Party		17,810	11.57
Irving Dominguez	Independent		11,123	7.23
Gilberto Marulanda	Broad Front for Democracy		3,163	2.05
Total			153,931	100.00
Valid votes			153,931	93.58
Invalid/blank votes			10,558	6.42
Total votes			164,489	100.00
Source: Election Tribunal

==== Arraiján ====
Candidate	Party	Votes	%
Rollyns Rodriguez	Democratic Revolutionary Party	31,977	28.00
Belkis Saavedra	Democratic Change	26,934	23.59
Militza Palma	People's Party	21,969	19.24
Percival Piggott	Panameñista Party	13,956	12.22
Maruquel Luque	Independent	7,277	6.37
Victor Godoy	Independent	4,859	4.26
Ivan Berrio	Independent	3,412	2.99
Luis Pimentel	Nationalist Republican Liberal Movement	1,794	1.57
Denis Amaya	Broad Front for Democracy	1,526	1.34
Norma Estrada	Alliance Party	489	0.43
Total		114,193	100.00
Valid votes		114,193	94.52
Invalid/blank votes		6,620	5.48
Total votes		120,813	100.00
Source: Election Tribunal

==== Colón ====
Candidate	Party or alliance		Votes	%
Alex Lee	Democratic Revolutionary Party		21,826	22.43
Diogenes Galvan	Independent		20,027	20.58
Federico Policani	Panama We Can	Panameñista Party	14,519	14.92
Federico Policani	Panama We Can	People's Party	4,388	4.51
Federico Policani	Panama We Can	Total	18,907	19.43
Carlos Outten	Democratic Change		15,794	16.23
Enrique Brooks Galvan	Independent		6,645	6.83
Felipe Cabeza	Broad Front for Democracy		5,759	5.92
Cristobal Gondola	Nationalist Republican Liberal Movement		5,460	5.61
Josefina Smith	Alliance Party		2,893	2.97
Total			97,311	100.00
Valid votes			97,311	93.25
Invalid/blank votes			7,048	6.75
Total votes			104,359	100.00
Source: Election Tribunal

==== La Chorrera ====
Candidate	Party or alliance		Votes	%
Tomás Velasquez	Joining Forces	Democratic Revolutionary Party	31,259	33.68
Tomás Velasquez	Joining Forces	Nationalist Republican Liberal Movement	3,868	4.17
Tomás Velasquez	Joining Forces	Total	35,127	37.85
Chuin Fa Chong	Alliance Party		24,696	26.61
Mario Muñoz	Democratic Change		12,962	13.97
Alberto Barranco	Panama We Can	Panameñista Party	6,746	7.27
Alberto Barranco	Panama We Can	People's Party	2,699	2.91
Alberto Barranco	Panama We Can	Total	9,445	10.18
Dario Gomez	Independent		9,014	9.71
Armando Barrios	Broad Front for Democracy		1,573	1.69
Total			92,817	100.00
Valid votes			92,817	92.79
Invalid/blank votes			7,211	7.21
Total votes			100,028	100.00
Source: Election Tribunal

==== David ====
Candidate	Party or alliance		Votes	%
Antonio Arauz	Democratic Revolutionary Party		28,132	36.55
Joaquín De León	Panameñista Party		19,428	25.24
Karen Caballero	Independent	Democratic Change	8,211	10.67
Karen Caballero	Independent	Independent	4,060	5.27
Karen Caballero	Independent	Total	12,271	15.94
Nicolás Rivera	Nationalist Republican Liberal Movement		6,545	8.50
Agustín Saldaña	Independent	Independent	3,016	3.92
Agustín Saldaña	Independent	People's Party	2,505	3.25
Agustín Saldaña	Independent	Total	5,521	7.17
Amael Acosta	Independent		3,460	4.50
Néstor Camargo	Alliance Party		945	1.23
Tomas Armuelles	Broad Front for Democracy		666	0.87
Total			76,968	100.00
Valid votes			76,968	93.09
Invalid/blank votes			5,715	6.91
Total votes			82,683	100.00
Source: Election Tribunal

==== Santiago ====
Candidate	Party or alliance		Votes	%
Samid Sandoval	Change to Wake Up	Democratic Change	19,102	35.26
Samid Sandoval	Change to Wake Up	Alliance Party	1,093	2.02
Samid Sandoval	Change to Wake Up	Total	20,195	37.28
Edward Ibarra	Democratic Revolutionary Party		18,809	34.72
Victor Rodriguez	Panameñista Party		7,245	13.37
Isaac Rodriguez	Independent		4,233	7.81
Horacio Freeman	Nationalist Republican Liberal Movement		1,777	3.28
Edilso Vega	Independent		1,220	2.25
Santiago Murillo	Independent		460	0.85
Edgardo Abrego	Broad Front for Democracy		237	0.44
Total			54,176	100.00
Valid votes			54,176	93.81
Invalid/blank votes			3,575	6.19
Total votes			57,751	100.00
Source: Election Tribunal
