= List of presidents of the National Assembly of Panama =

List of presidents of the National Assembly of Panama.

Below is a list of office-holders from 1956:

Name	Took office	Left office	Party
Ricardo Arias Espinosa	1956	1957	National Patriotic Coalition
Diógenes A. Pino	1957	1958	National Patriotic Coalition
Eligio Crespo Villalaz	1958	1959	National Patriotic Coalition
Pablo Othon Valdelamar	1959	1960	National Patriotic Coalition
Jacinto López y León	1960	1961	National Liberal Party
Abraham Pretto Stevenson	1961	1962	Third Nationalist Party
Jorge Rubén Rosas	1962	1963	National Liberation Movement
Ricardo A. Arango P.	1963	1964	Republican Party
Alfredo Ramírez	1964	1965	National Liberal Party
Raúl Arango Jr.	1965	1967	National Liberal Party
Carlos Agustín Arias Chiari	1967	1968	National Liberal Party
Jacobo L. Salas Díaz	1968	1968	Panameñista Party
Elías Ariel Castillo González	1972	1973	independent
Carlos A. Espino V.	1973	1974	independent
Raúl Enrique Chang Pineda	1974	1975	independent
Dario González Pittí	1975	1976	independent
Fernando A. González H.	1976	1977	independent
José Octavio Huerta A.	1977	1978	independent
Víctor Corrales Núñez	1978	1979	independent
Blas Joaquín Celis	1979	1980	Democratic Revolutionary Party
Luis De León Arias	1980	1982	Democratic Revolutionary Party
Lorenzo Sotero Alfonso Gobea	1982	1984	Democratic Revolutionary Party
Jerry Vicente Wilson Navarro	1984	1985	Democratic Revolutionary Party
Camilo Gozaine Gozaine	1985	1986	Democratic Revolutionary Party
Ovidio Díaz V.	1986	1987	Democratic Revolutionary Party
Alberto Alemán Boyd	1987	1988	Democratic Revolutionary Party
Celso G. Carrizo Medrano	1988	1989	Democratic Revolutionary Party
Carlos Arellano Lennox	1990	1990	Christian Democratic Party
Alonso Fernández Guardia	1990	1991	Nationalist Republican Liberal Movement
Marco A. Ameglio Samudio	1991	1992	Authentic Liberal Party
Lucas Ramón Zarak Linares	1992	1993	Authentic Liberal Party
Arturo Ulises Vallarino Bartuano	1993	1994	Nationalist Republican Liberal Movement
Balbina Herrera Araúz	1994	1995	Democratic Revolutionary Party
Carlos R. Alvarado Acosta	1995	1996	Democratic Revolutionary Party
César A. Pardo Rivera	1996	1997	Democratic Revolutionary Party
Gerardo González Vernaza	1997	1999	Democratic Revolutionary Party
Enrique A. Garrido Arosemena	1999	2000	Christian Democratic Party
Laurentino Cortizo Cohen	2000	2001	Solidarity Party
Rubén Arosemena Valdéz	2001	2002	People's Party
Carlos R. Alvarado Acosta	2002	2003	Democratic Revolutionary Party
Jacobo L. Salas Díaz	2003	2004	Arnulfista Party
Jerry Vicente Wilson Navarro	2004	2005	Democratic Revolutionary Party
Elías Ariel Castillo González	2005	2007	Democratic Revolutionary Party
Pedro Miguel González Pinzón	2007	2008	Democratic Revolutionary Party
Raúl Eugenio Rodríguez Araúz	2008	2009	Democratic Revolutionary Party
José Luis Varela Rodríguez	2009	2010	Panameñista Party
José Muñoz Molina	2010	2011	Democratic Change
Héctor Aparicio Díaz	2011	2012	Democratic Change
Sergio Gálvez	2012	2014	Democratic Change
Adolfo Valderrama	2014	2015	Panameñista Party
Rubén De León Sánchez	2015	2017	Democratic Revolutionary Party
Yanibel Ábrego	July 2017	July 2019	Democratic Change
Marcos Castillero	July 2019	July 2021	Democratic Revolutionary Party
Crispiano Adames	July 2021	July 2023	Democratic Revolutionary Party
Jaime Vargas	July 2023	July 2024	Democratic Revolutionary Party
Dana Castañeda	July 2024	July 2025	Realizing Goals
Jorge Herrera	July 2025	Incumbent	Panameñista Party

== Sources ==
- Corte Nacional Electoral, http://bdigital.binal.ac.pa/bdp/descarga.php?f=Palabras%20Llanas.pdf
