= José I. Blandón =

José I. Blandón may refer to:

- José Isabel Blandón Castillo (born c. 1944), former top aide to Manuel Noriega
- José Isabel Blandón Figueroa (born 1967), Panamanian legislator
