= 2014 supranational electoral calendar =

Several supranational elections were held in 2014.

== May ==
- 4 May: Panama, Elections for the Central American Parliament
- 22–25 May: European Union, European Parliament

== June ==
- 11 June: United Nations General Assembly, United Nations General Assembly President

== October ==
- United Nations Security Council, Security Council

== November ==
- United Nations Human Rights Council, Human Rights Council
