= Yanibel Ábrego =

Politician from Panama

President of the National Assembly
- In office 2017–2019

Deputy of the National Assembly
- In office 2009–2024

Personal details
- Born: 17 July 1978 (age 48) Panama City, Panama
- Party: Democratic Change (since 2010)
- Other political affiliations: Independent (until 2010)
- Spouse: Quibían Panay
- Occupation: Politician

Yanibel Yineva Ábrego Smith (born 17 July 1978) is a politician from Panama that formerly served as a Deputy of the National Assembly from 2009 until 2024 and was President of the National Assembly from 2017 until 2019. In 2024, she was elected leader of the Democratic Change party.

== Early life and career ==
Ábrego was born in Panama City on 17 July 1978 and studied at the Isabel Herrera de Obaldía Professional School. She then studied for a Business Administration and Accounting degree from the University of Panama, and holds a diploma from a university in Argentina in Political Science.

== Political career ==
She was first elected to the National Assembly as an independent for the 8-2 Circuit seat in the 2009 general election. In 2010 she joined Democratic Change and was re-elected as a Deputy at the 2014 election, and for the 13-2 circuit seat at the 2019 election. In July 2017, she was elected as President of the National Assembly (the presiding officer of the Assembly) with 37 votes out of 71, serving until 2019.

In 2023, she sought the presidential nomination of Democratic Change, but lost to incumbent party chairman and previous presidential candidate Rómulo Roux. Due to losing the presidential primary, she was blocked from running for re-election as a Deputy at the 2024 election.

In October 2024, she was elected as leader of Democratic Change at their national convention.

== Personal life ==
Ábrego married Quibían Panay, a former Deputy of the National Assembly, in 2020.
