= Ana Matilde Gómez =

Panamanian politician

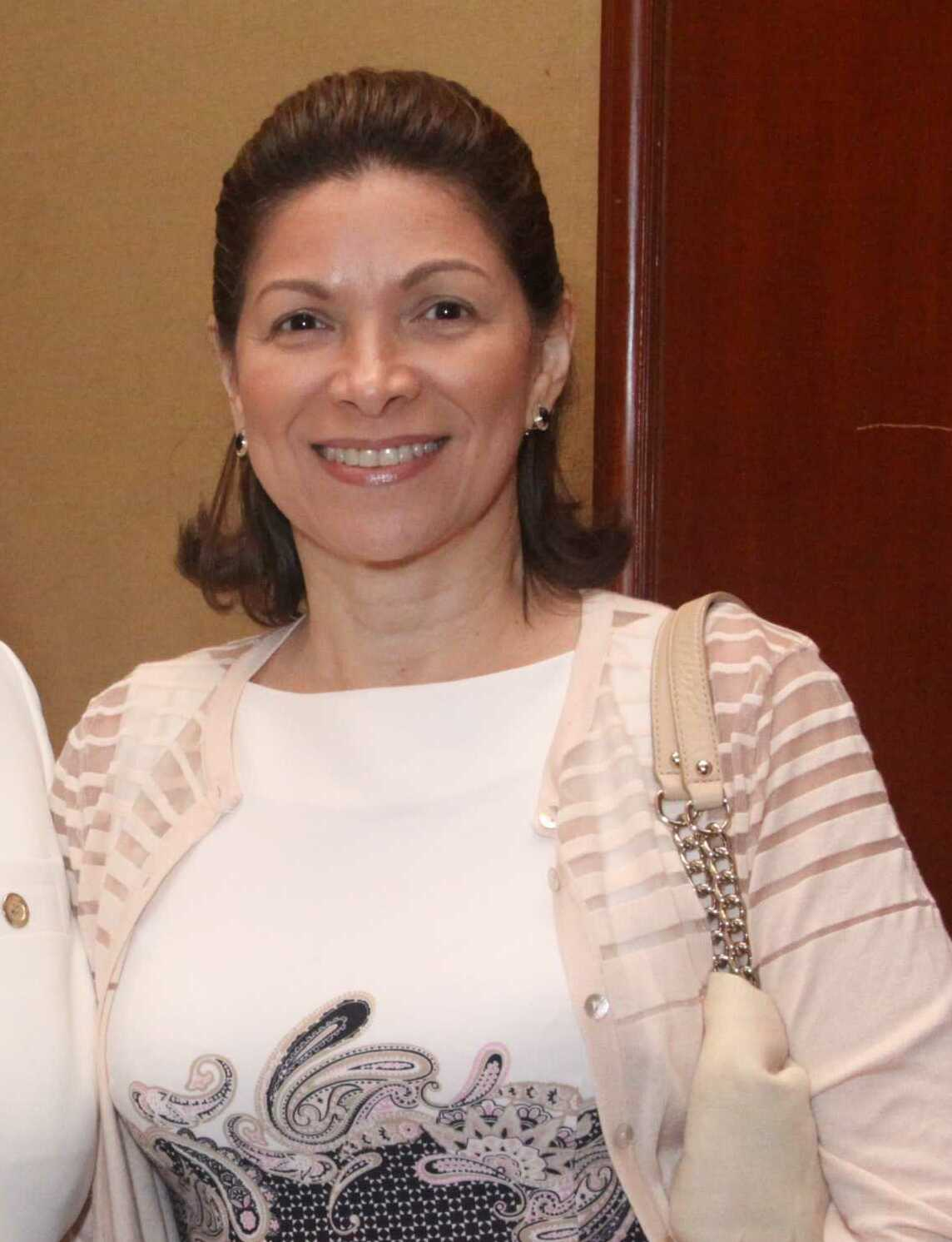

Member of the National Assembly
- In office July 1, 2014 – June 30, 2019
- President: Juan Carlos Varela
- Constituency: Circuit 8-7 (Ancón, Bella Vista, Betania, Calidonia, Curundú, El Chorrillo, Pueblo Nuevo, San Felipe, Santa Ana)

Attorney General of Panama
- In office January 3, 2005 – February 5, 2010
- President: Martín Torrijos (2005–2009); Ricardo Martinelli (2009–2010)
- Preceded by: José Antonio Sossa
- Succeeded by: Giuseppe Bonissi

Personal details
- Born: Ana Matilde Gómez Ruiloba; November 5, 1962 (age 62); Panama City, Panama
- Political party: Independent
- Spouse: Francisco Sousa Lennox (m. 2004)
- Children: 2
- Education: University of Panama; Universidad Católica Santa María La Antigua
- Occupation: Lawyer, politician
- Website: www.anamatildegomez.com

Ana Matilde Gómez Ruiloba (born November 5, 1962) is a Panamanian lawyer and politician who served as the country's Attorney General from 2005 to 2010, and a deputy of the National Assembly from 2014 to 2019. She was a candidate for President of Panama in the 2019 general election.

== Biography ==
Ana Matilde Gómez was born in Panama City on November 5, 1962. She holds a licentiate in law and political sciences and a master's degree in criminology, both from the University of Panama, and a diploma in human rights from the Universidad Católica Santa María La Antigua. She married pediatrician Francisco Sousa Lennox in 2004.

She has held various public sector positions in the area of law, working within the Public Ministry as a scribe, senior officer, judicial secretary, municipal spokesperson, circuit court prosecutor, assistant district attorney, then as a corporate lawyer in the Interoceanic Region Authority and legal executive director of the Truth Commission.

On the academic level, she has taught criminology and human rights at the Latin University of Panama. She practiced as a trial lawyer in the area of criminal law, and was a legal consultant for Panama Canal river basin improvement projects.

== Attorney General of Panama ==
Gómez was the first woman to head the Office of the Attorney General, taking over on January 3, 2005. Her term would have lasted until December 31, 2014, but on February 5, 2010, she left office by order of the Supreme Court, which suspended her during an investigation for abuse of authority.

She was denounced by a prosecutor from La Chorrera, whom she had dismissed after he was caught soliciting a bribe from the father of a detained minor. He accused Gómez after the Court ruled that the telephone interceptions that she ordered in the course of the investigation against him were illegal. On August 11, 2009, the Supreme Court ordered Gómez's dismissal and sentenced her to six months in jail, commutable for a payment of 4,000 balboas. In addition, in 2010 she was disqualified from holding public office for four years.

On February 16, 2011, she filed a lawsuit against the Panamanian state in the Inter-American Court of Human Rights for the violation of its judicial guarantees in the process that removed her from office. She alleged that her dismissal and conviction were arbitrary.

== Member of the Legislative Assembly ==
On May 4, 2014, Gómez was elected to the National Assembly for Circuit 8-7, receiving more votes than any other deputy. This was the subject of controversy, as several political analysts claimed that Gómez's candidacy was unconstitutional, since in 2010 she had been disqualified from holding public office. However, a ruling by the Supreme Court reduced the original penalty of four years of disqualification to six months, enabling Gómez to take her seat in the National Assembly.

As a deputy, Gómez was a defender of human rights, and introduced 36 bills. She was also very critical toward other deputies, claiming that the National Assembly requires "profound changes" in its internal organic regime and in the form of election of deputies.

== Presidential candidacy ==
In August 2017, she announced her intention to become a candidate for President of Panama for the term 2019–2024 via free application. On January 11, 2019, the Electoral Tribunal announced that it had validated 131,415 signatures (meeting the requirement of 1% of votes cast in the last election), establishing Ana Matilde Gómez as one of the three free-application candidates for the presidency in the 2019 general election.

She finished fifth overall, receiving 93,631 votes (4.7% of the total).
