= Rommel Fernández Stadium =

Stadium in Panama City

Estadio Rommel Fernández Gutiérrez
- El Coloso de Juan Díaz "The Colossus of Juan Díaz"
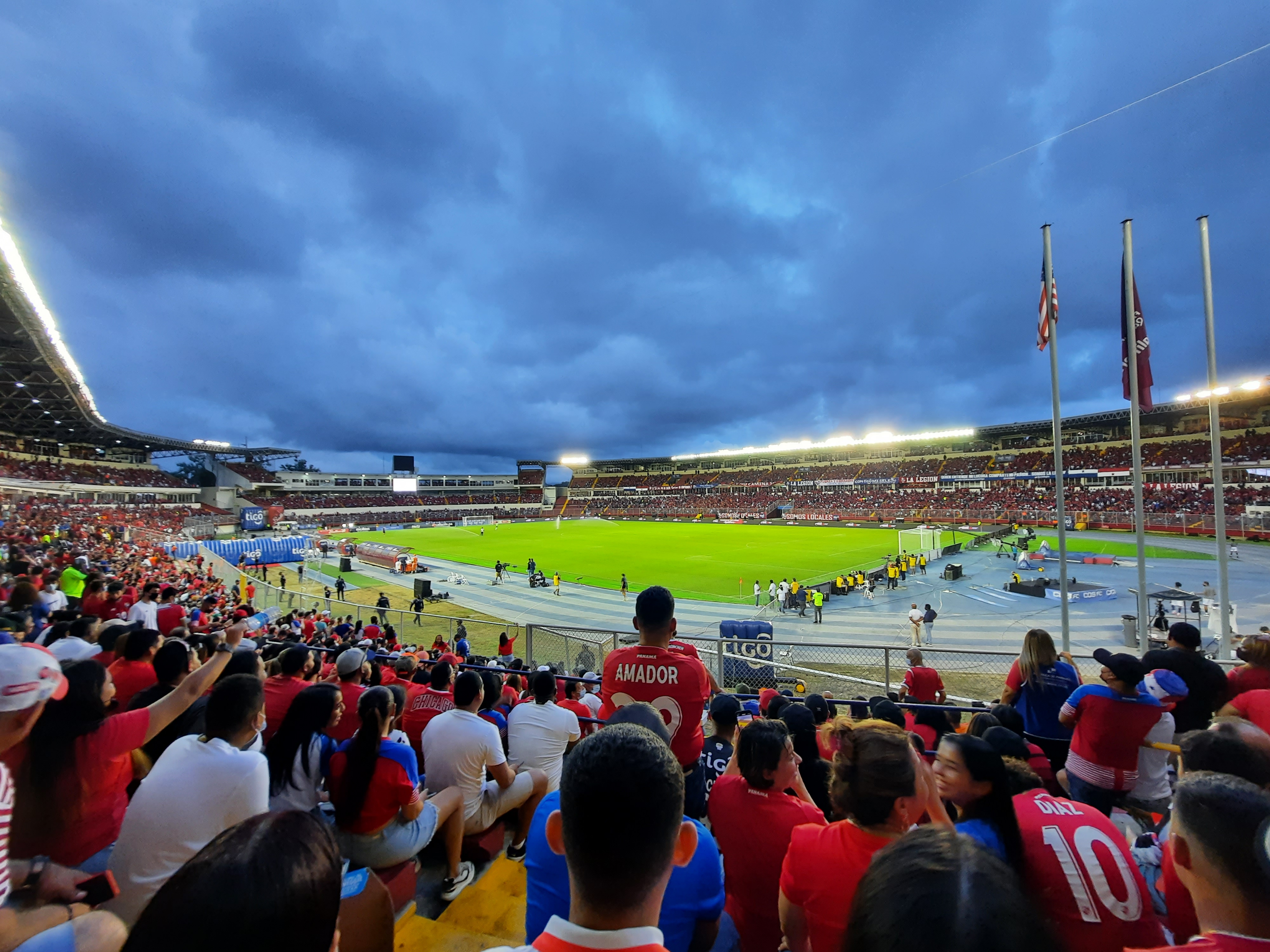
- Interactive map of Estadio Rommel Fernández Gutiérrez
- Former names: Estadio Revolución (1970–1993)
- Location: Panama City, Panama
- Coordinates: 9°02′09″N 79°28′10″W
- Owner: INDE
- Operator: FEPAFUT
- Capacity: 23,000
- Surface: GrassMaster

Construction
- Opened: February 6, 1970
- Renovated: 2006–2010, 2023–2024
- Expanded: 2006–2010
- Builder: Panama Revolutionary Government

Tenants
- Panama (1970–present); Tauro (1984–present)

The Rommel Fernández Gutiérrez Stadium (Spanish: Estadio Rommel Fernández Gutiérrez), named after the Panamanian football star Rommel Fernández (1966–1993), is a multi-purpose stadium in Panama City. It is used for different sports, but mainly football (soccer) games. It was inaugurated February 6, 1970, and was designed to accommodate the XI Central American and Caribbean Games in 1970. Through further reforms, the stadium reached its current capacity of 23,000 spectators all seated, the largest stadium in Panama. It is part of Sports City Irving Saladino.

== History ==
=== Early history ===
On April 4, 1976, it marked the debut of the Panama national team to make the run to the 1978 FIFA World Cup in Argentina. In Estadio Revolución, they took on Costa Rica and won surprisingly 3–2, with two goals from Agustin Sanchez and one from Luis Tapia. The most memorable ANAPROF match was the final match played in the stadium in 1996, when more than 25,000 fans watched San Francisco F.C. take on Plaza Amador.

The original name of the stadium was Estadio Revolución (meaning "Revolution Stadium"), but in 1993, it changed its name to Estadio Rommel Fernández in honour of Rommel Fernández Gutiérrez, a Panamanian soccer player who died in a car accident in Albacete, Spain, on May 6 of that year. At that time, the stadium had a capacity of 22,000. The stadium is often used by LPF, Liga Panameña de Futbol.

=== Recent history ===
In 2009, the stadium was totally renovated; its shape and facade were changed completely, more seats were installed as well as a new giant screen and a new athletics track, and it is fully air conditioned with modern equipment. It was the spearhead for IX Central American Sports Games 2010, in which the stadium was reopened in the opening ceremony of these games.
