= Nationalist Republican Liberal Movement =

Political party in Panama

Nationalist Republican Liberal Movement Movimiento Liberal Republicano Nacionalista
- Leader: Francisco Aleman
- Founded: October 1, 1982
- Merger of: CPN; TPN; MLN
- Headquarters: Panama City
- Ideology: National liberalism Liberalism; Conservatism
- Political position: Centre-right
- Regional affiliation: Center-Democratic Integration Group
- Colours: Yellow, Red
- Seats in the National Assembly: 1 / 71
- District Mayors: 3 / 81
- Corregimiento Representatives: 29 / 701
- Seats in the Central American Parliament (Panamanian seats): 1 / 20

Party flag

Website
- partidomolirena.com (archived)

The Nationalist Republican Liberal Movement (Spanish: Movimiento Liberal Republicano Nacionalista, MOLIRENA) is a centre-right conservative-liberal political party in Panama.

== History ==
The MOLIRENA was founded on October 21, 1981, by the now-defunct Third Nationalist Party, National Patriotic Coalition, National Liberation Movement and factions that had earlier split off from the National Liberal Party and Republican Party. This party evolved as part of an alliance of traditional, oligarchy-controlled, and primarily conservative organizations that opposed both the government and the military.

According to a Soviet Union news article published in 1988:

The MOLIRENA was aptly called a 'patchwork quilt' by local journalists. The characteristic feature of the party was the link of the agrarian oligarchy with the commercial bourgeoisie, i.e. a union of the most conservative segments of the country. The names of members of MOLIRENA leaders César Arrocha Graell, Guillermo Arias, and Rene Crespo, who, as members of the government before 1968, took part in the appropriation of almost a billion dollars from the state treasury, were mentioned in the local press in connection with former 'merits.'

In 1984, the party was part of the Democratic Opposition Alliance (ADO), which lost the presidential and legislative elections following suspected widespread fraud by the military.

During 1987, the party became increasingly involved in confrontations with the government. They openly campaigned—with strikes and street demonstrations, which were violently suppressed—to effect the resignation and removal of General Manuel Noriega, who was accused of drug trafficking, electoral fraud, corruption, and murder.

In May 1989, the MOLIRENA was again part of the Democratic Alliance of Civic Opposition (DAOC) coalition, which supported the presidential candidacy of Guillermo Endara of the Arnulfista Party, after the official ratification of the results following the US military invasion in December. Guillermo Ford became Second Vice-president of the Republic (1989–1994). During this term, Alonso Fernandez Guardia was president of the National Assembly (1991).

For the 1994 Panamanian general election, the party was the main component of the Alliance for Change '94, with MOLIRENA's Rubén Dario Carles as the coalition's presidential candidate. He received 171,192 votes (16.05%) and came in fourth.

In 1999, the MOLIRENA was allied with the Union for Panama (ADP) and its candidate Mireya Moscoso.

In 2004, the MOLIRENA was allied with the Vision of the Country (ADP) and its candidate José Miguel Alemán. The party won 8.6% of the popular vote and 4 out of 78 seats.

In 2009, it was allied with the Alliance for Change (ADP) and its candidate Ricardo Martinelli.

In 2014, the MOLIRENA allied with the Democratic Change party, and its candidate Jose Domingo Arias, but ultimately lost the election. Afterward, the MOLIRENA's president, Sergio Gonzalez Ruiz, resigned from his post and the presidency fell to San Miguelito legislator Francisco Aleman.

== Election results ==
=== Presidential elections ===
| Election | Candidate | Votes | | Vote % | | Result |
| Election | Candidate | Party | Alliance Total | Party | Alliance Total | Result |
|---|---|---|---|---|---|---|
| 1984 | Arnulfo Arias | 30,737 | 299,035 | 4.80 | 46.71 | ✗ Lost |
| 1989 | Guillermo Endara | 132,011 | 463,388 | 20.28 | 71.18 | ✓ Elected |
| 1994 | Rubén Dario Carles | 116,478 | 171,192 | 10.82 | 16.05 | ✗ Lost |
| 1999 | Mireya Moscoso | 140,240 | 572,717 | 10.97 | 44.80 | ✓ Elected |
| 2004 | José Miguel Alemán | 60,106 | 245,568 | 4.01 | 16.38 | ✗ Lost |
| 2009 | Ricardo Martinelli | 94,841 | 952,333 | 5.98 | 60.03 | ✓ Elected |
| 2014 | José Domingo Arias | 98,519 | 581,828 | 5.31 | 31.38 | ✗ Lost |
| 2019 | Laurentino Cortizo | 45,664 | 655,302 | 2.32 | 33.35 | ✓ Elected |
| 2024 | José Gabriel Carrizo | 7,337 | 133,791 | 0.32 | 5.88 | ✗ Lost |

=== National Assembly elections ===
| Election | Leader | Votes | % | Seats | +/– | Government |
|---|---|---|---|---|---|---|
| 1984 | Guillermo Ford | 50,936 | 8.36% (#6) | 3 / 67 | New | Opposition |
| 1989 | Guillermo Ford | 122,974 | 20.19% (#2) | 17 / 67 | ▲14 | Coalition |
| 1994 | Rubén Dario Carles | 116,833 | 11.30% (#3) | 5 / 72 | ▼12 | Opposition |
| 1999 | Arturo Vallarino | 92,711 | 7.54% (#4) | 3 / 71 | ▼2 | Coalition |
| 2004 | Arturo Vallarino | 125,547 | 8.64% (#4) | 4 / 78 | ▲1 | Opposition |
| 2009 | | 70,457 | 4.68% (#5) | 2 / 71 | ▼2 | Coalition |
| 2014 | Sergio Gonzalez Ruiz | 121,815 | 7.16% (#4) | 2 / 71 | 0 | Opposition |
| 2019 | Francisco Aleman | 92,340 | 5.11% (#4) | 5 / 71 | ▲3 | Coalition |
| 2024 | Francisco Aleman | 67,908 | 3.17% (#7) | 1 / 71 | ▼4 | Opposition |

=== PARLACEN elections ===
The amount of seats allocated for the PARLACEN is based on the vote share obtained by each party in the presidential election.

| Election | Leader | Votes | % | Seats | +/– |
|---|---|---|---|---|---|
| 2019 | Francisco Aleman | 45,664 | 2.32% (#4) | 1 / 20 | |
| 2024 | Francisco Aleman | 7,337 | 0.32% (#8) | 1 / 20 | 0 |

== See also ==
- Liberalism worldwide
- Liberalism in Panama
