= José Arias =

José Arias may refer to:

- José Arias (alpine skier) (1922–2015), Spanish alpine skier
- José Domingo Arias, Panamanian economist and politician
- Pepe Arias (1900–1967), Argentine actor

== See also ==
- José Areas (born 1946), Nicaraguan percussionist
