= Rubén De León Sánchez =

Panamanian politician

Rubén De León Sánchez (born 1965) is a Panamanian politician of the Democratic Revolutionary Party (PRD) who served as the President of the National Assembly of Panama from 1 July 2015 until 1 July 2017.

De León gained an economics degree at University in Veraguas Province. He served as the regional director of the Housing Ministry in this province from 1994 to 1998 and was elected to the National Assembly for the same province in 1999.

In the Assembly, he served as the leader of the PRD Assembly group for the 2013-2014 legislative session. On 1 July 2015, he was elected president of the National Assembly, gaining the support of the Panameñista Party and Democratic Change, in addition to deputies from his own party.
