= Liberalism in Panama =

This article gives an overview of liberalism in Panama. It is limited to liberal parties with substantial support, mainly proved by having had a representation in parliament. The sign ⇒ means a reference to another party in that scheme. For inclusion in this scheme it is not necessary that parties labeled themselves as a liberal party.

== Introduction ==
Liberalism in Panama derived from liberalism in Colombia. The liberal current is one of the main political currents in Panama. The National Liberal Party (Partido Liberal Nacional), observer LI) is a left of center liberal party, as is the Nationalist Republican Liberal Movement (Partido Movimiento Liberal Republicano Nacionalista).

== The timeline ==
=== (National) Liberal Party ===
- 1903: At the independence of Panama the Panama section of the Colombian Liberal Party established the Liberal Party (Partido Liberal), led by Belisario Porras.
- 1940: The party is renamed into the National Liberal Party (Partido Liberal Nacional).
- 1970: The party is banned.
- 1981: The party is allowed to register again.
- 1987: Factions formed the ⇒ Progressive Liberal Party and the ⇒ Authentic Liberal Party.
- 1989: The Progressive Liberal Party rejoined the party and its leader, Roderick Esquivel becomes party leader.
- 2009: The party merged with the Solidarity Party to form the Patriotic Union Party.

=== Nationalist Republican Liberal Movement ===
- 1981: A faction of the liberal current established the Nationalist Republican Liberal Movement (Movimento Liberal Republicano Nacionalista).

=== Progressive Liberal Party ===
- 1987: A faction of the ⇒ National Liberal Party formed the Progressive Liberal Party (Partido Liberal Progresista), led by Roderick Esquivel.
- 1989: The party rejoined the National Liberal Party.

=== Authentic Liberal Party ===
- 1987: A faction of the ⇒ National Liberal Party formed the conservative liberal anti-authoritarian Authentic Liberal Party (Partido Liberal Auténtico), led by Arnulfo Escalona Ríos.
- 1999: The party lost registration.

== See also ==
- History of Panama
- Politics of Panama
- List of political parties in Panama
