= Office of the Attorney General of the Nation (Panama) =

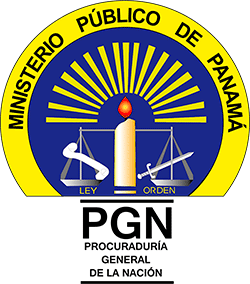
Logo of the Public Prosecutor's Office of Panama

The Office of the Attorney General of the Nation of Panama (or Public Prosecutor's Office) is responsible for investigating and suppressing crimes. Likewise, the office is an autonomous entity— as it does not belong to either the Executive, Legislative or Judicial Branch. Due to the constitutional and legal power to exercise the action of the Panamanian state, the office participates in the administrative process of justice and even monitors public officials. The Attorney General is the superior head of the Public Ministry of Panama.

The current attorney general is Luis Carlos Manuel Gómez Rudy since 2024.

== See also ==
- Politics of Panama
