= Saúl Méndez =

Panamanian trade union leader

Saúl Méndez Rodríguez (Colón, 26 December 1969) is a Panamanian trade union leader, general secretary of the National Union of Construction and Similar Workers (SUNTRACS) since 2010 and presidential candidate of the Broad Front for Democracy in the general elections of May 2019.

== Biography ==
He was born in the city of Colón, being the son of Eustaquio Méndez, a former policeman of the province of Chiriquí, and Luzmila Rodríguez, a native of the province of Coclé.

On 21 May 2025, Méndez entered the Bolivian embassy seeking asylum after arrest warrants were issued in connection with a money-laundering investigation into the union and anti-government protests that it led.
