= José Isabel Blandón Castillo =

Panamanian politician

José Isabel Blandón Castillo (born c. 1944) was a close adviser to Panama's Dictator Manuel Noriega; he was described in 1988 by The Washington Post as "one of [Noriega's] oldest and closest advisers", and became a "key informant" in Noriega's drug-related prosecution in the United States.

== Career ==
Blandón was a "senior intelligence officer" in Panama and said in 1988 that as "chief of political intelligence" until 1986 he had had access to classified military intelligence reports, including reports from the US.

Blandón was Panama's Consul-General in New York when he was dismissed by Noriega in January 1988. He had been the author of a so-called "Blandon Plan" which he said Noriega had asked him to devise in mid-1987, on how to transition to a more democratic government, with Noriega stepping down.

Blandón's 1988 testimony to the US Senate's Kerry Committee included allegations about the Panamanian links to the Iran-Contra affair, and claims that the CIA had aided in covering up the 1985 assassination by Noriega of government critic Hugo Spadafora.

The father of Panamanian legislator José Isabel Blandón Figueroa, his son's disapproval of Blandón's position as a top aide to Manuel Noriega helped push Blandón to defecting.
