= Federico Policani =

Panamanian politician

Mayor of Colón, Panamá

Personal details
- Party: Panameñista
- Portfolio: Businessman

Federico Policani was the mayor of Colón District, Panama for the period of 2014 to 2019 (period of 5 years).

Policana replaced former mayor Damaso Garcia, who was temporarily suspended in 2010 when convicted of manslaughter for an auto accident. The transition did not go smoothly as Garcia failed to provide reports on the status of departments or contracts. Many departments were without any usable equipment and had no funds left.

Policani is the son of Luciana Policani, the former governor of the district who served from 2000 to 2004, during the administration of former president Mireya Moscoso.
