= Rómulo Roux =

Panamanian politician

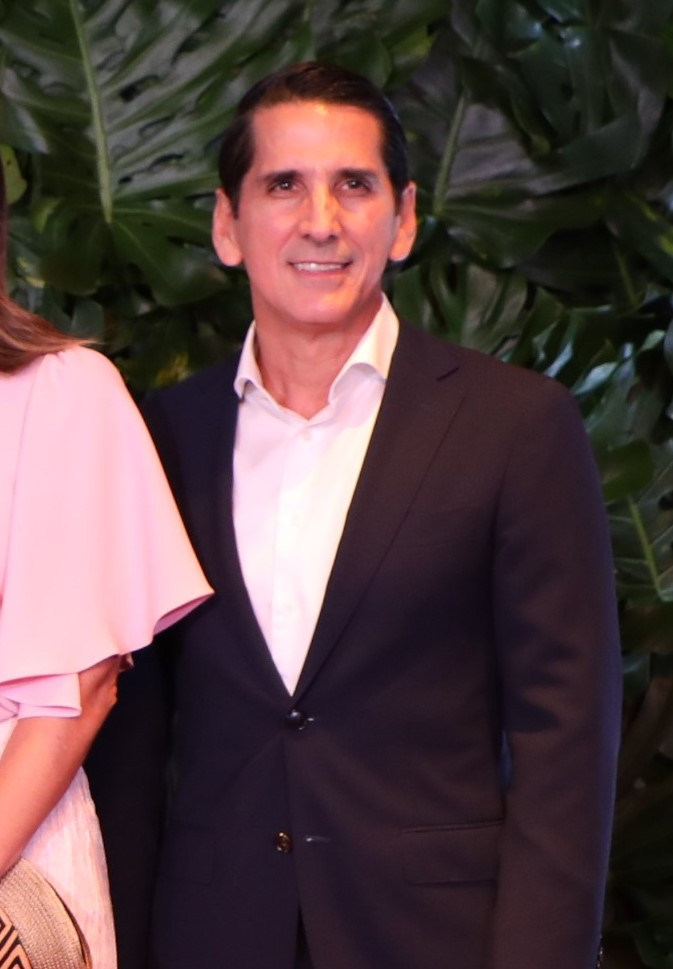
- Romulo Roux in 2019

Minister of Foreign Affairs
- In office 20 August 2012 – 22 February 2013
- President: Ricardo Martinelli
- Preceded by: Roberto Henríquez
- Succeeded by: Fernando Núñez Fábrega

Minister of Panama Canal Affairs
- In office 1 July 2009 – 20 August 2012
- President: Ricardo Martinelli
- Preceded by: Dany Kusniecky
- Succeeded by: Roberto Roy

Personal details
- Born: Rómulo Alberto Roux Moses; 8 January 1965 (age 61) Panama City, Panama
- Party: Democratic Change
- Spouse: Victoria Heurtematte
- Children: 7
- Education: Babson University (B.B.A.); Northwestern University (M.B.A.); University of Miami (J.D.)
- Occupation: Lawyer • Politician

Rómulo Alberto Roux Moses (born 8 January 1965) is a Panamanian politician, lawyer, and businessman who served as chairman of the party Democratic Change from 2018 until 2024. He was the party's presidential candidate for the 2019 general election and again in the 2024 general election (in which he received 11.38% of the total vote).

He formerly served as the Minister of External Affairs and Minister of Panama Canal Affairs.
