= Juan Carlos Varela =

President of Panama from 2014 to 2019

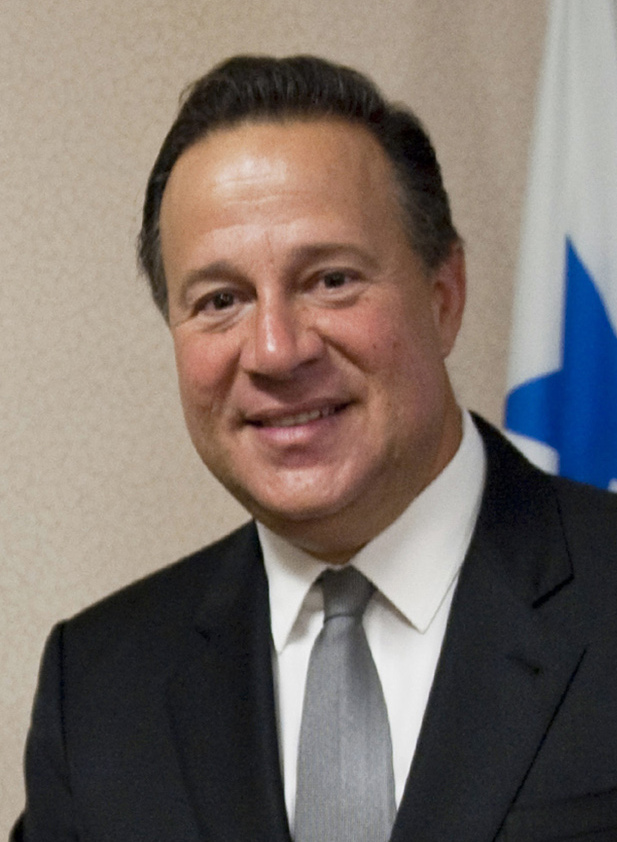
- Varela in 2014

37th President of Panama
- In office 1 July 2014 – 1 July 2019
- Vice President: Isabel Saint Malo
- Preceded by: Ricardo Martinelli
- Succeeded by: Laurentino Cortizo

6th Vice President of Panama
- In office 1 July 2009 – 1 July 2014
- President: Ricardo Martinelli
- Preceded by: Samuel Lewis Navarro (as First Vice President of Panama); Rubén Arosemena (as Second Vice President of Panama)
- Succeeded by: Isabel Saint Malo

Minister of Foreign Relations
- In office 1 July 2009 – 30 August 2011
- President: Ricardo Martinelli
- Preceded by: Samuel Lewis Navarro
- Succeeded by: Roberto Henriquez

Personal details
- Born: Juan Carlos Varela Rodríguez; 12 December 1963 (age 62) Panama City, Panama
- Party: Panameñista Party
- Spouse: Lorena Castillo (m. 1992)
- Education: Georgia Institute of Technology (BS)
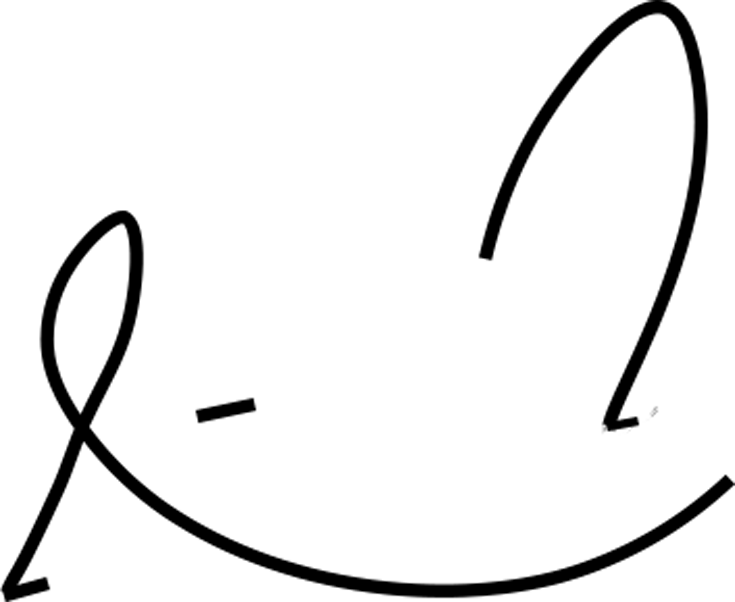
- Signature

Juan Carlos Varela Rodríguez (Spanish pronunciation: [xwaŋ ˈkaɾlos βaˈɾela roˈðɾiɣes]; born 12 December 1963) is a Panamanian businessman and former politician who served as the 37th president of Panama from 2014 to 2019. Varela previously was the vice president of Panama from 2009 to 2014 and Minister of Foreign Relations from 2009 to 2011 under President Ricardo Martinelli. He led the Panameñistas, the third-largest political party in Panama, from 2006 to 2016.

Varela won the 2014 presidential election with over 39% of the vote against the Cambio Democrático Party led by his former political partner Martinelli, whose candidate was José Domingo Arias. He was sworn in as president on 1 July 2014.

On 13 July 2023, US Secretary of State Antony Blinken announced that Varela was ineligible for entry into the United States due to his involvement in significant corruption: according to the US, he accepted bribes in exchange for improperly awarding government contracts. Varela denied the accusation.

== Early life and education ==
Born in Panama City to Luis José Varela Arjona and Bexie Esther Rodríguez Pedreschi. Varela is a businessman and entrepreneur, whose family hails from Herrera Province. His paternal grandfather José Varela Blanco (-1944) emigrated from Bergondo, Galicia, Spain and settled in Pesé district, Herrera, Panama in 1893. In 1908 Varela Blanco founded the first sugar mill were the Hacienda San Isidro distillery in Pesé is located. The company Varelas Hermanos SA is a major rum producer. After graduating from Colegio Javier, he attended the Georgia Institute of Technology in the United States, where he graduated with a Bachelor of Science degree in Industrial Engineering in 1985.

== Career ==
Styles of Juan Carlos Varela
- Reference style: His Excellency
- Spoken style: Your Excellency
- Alternative style: Sir

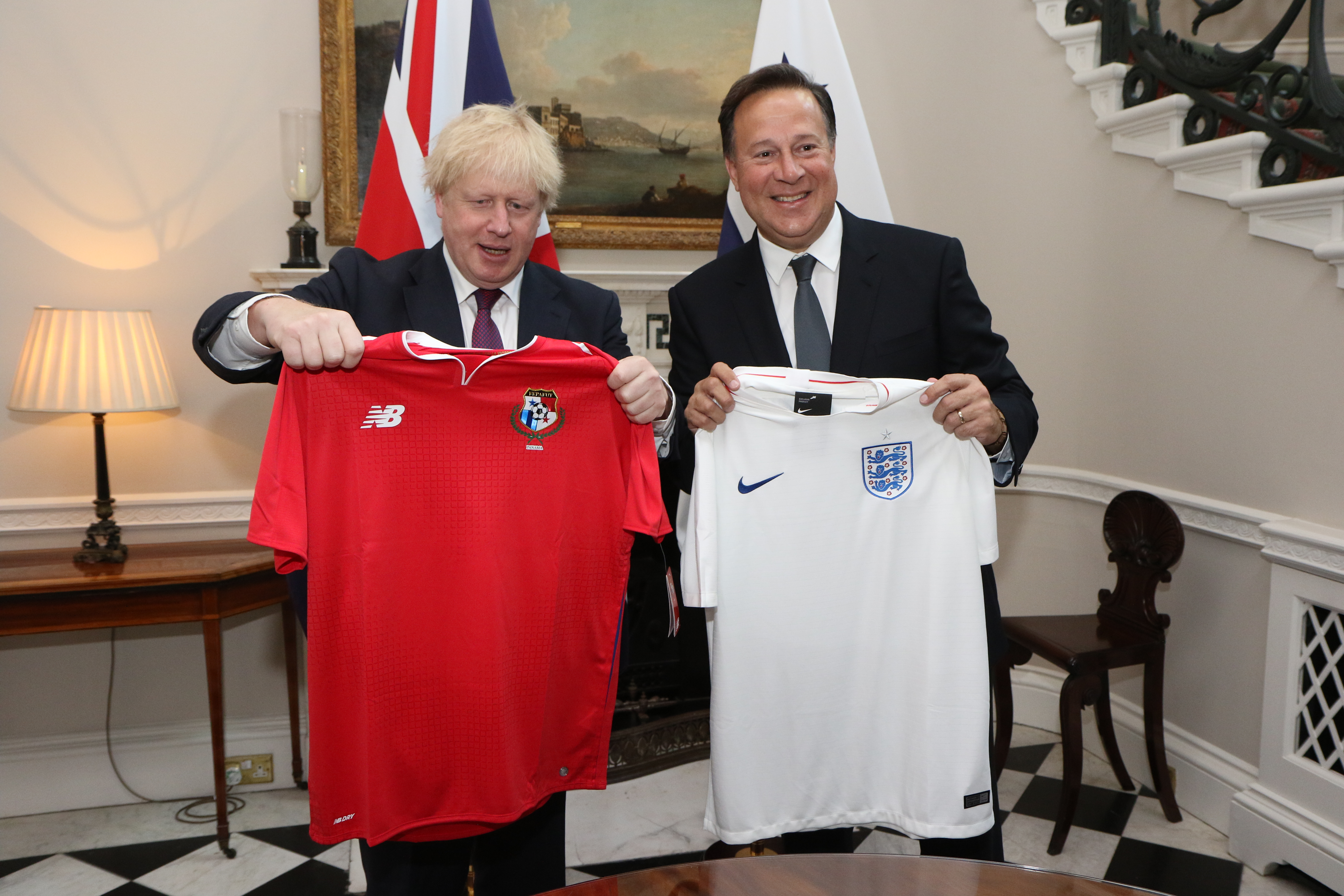
Varela meets with United Kingdom Foreign Secretary Boris Johnson in 2018.

In the private sector, Varela has been on the board of his family company since 1986, serving as Executive Vice-President of Varela Hermanos S.A. until 2008.

Varela entered politics in the early 1990s, becoming chief of the Panameñista Party campaign in 1994 and was the Panameñista Party's presidential candidate during the 2009 election; Varela joined forces with his rival, Ricardo Martinelli, as vice-presidential candidate, being sworn in on 1 July 2009 as Vice-President of Panama under President Martinelli. Varela won the 2014 presidential election, winning against the ruling-party candidate José Domingo Arias, who was supported by Cambio Democrático, a party led by outgoing President Ricardo Martinelli. Varela won about 39% of the vote against 32% for Arias. The subject announced he would seek to change the legislative body through constitutional changes.

He is suspected of being involved in the Odebrecht corruption scandal (a Brazilian company that paid bribes to politicians)

Close to the U.S. government on foreign policy issues, in October 2018, following a visit by U.S. Secretary of State Mike Pompeo on "China's predatory economic activity," he canceled five infrastructure projects with Chinese companies.

His popularity is affected by declining economic activity, rising living costs, corruption scandals and the crisis in the health and justice sectors.

== Controversies ==
Juan Carlos Varela was indicted in July 2020 for money laundering in the Odebrecht case.

In October 2021, his name was mentioned in the Pandora Papers.

== Personal life ==
Cross pro merito Melitensi

He is the son of José Varela and Beixie née Rodríguez. Varela married Panamanian journalist Lorena Castillo in 1992.

== See also ==
- Politics of Panama
- Elections in Panama
- List of heads of state of Panama

== External sources ==
- Vicepresidente de Panamá · Presidencia.gob.pa
- Toma de posesión Juan Carlos Varela
- Biography of Juan Carlos Varela
- Twitter: Juan Carlos Varela
- Facebook: Juan Carlos Varela
- Website: Juan Carlos Varela
- Biography by CIDOB

Party political offices
Preceded by Marco Ameglio	President of the Panameñista Party; 2006–present	Incumbent
Political offices
Preceded by Samuel Lewis Navarro	Minister of Foreign Relations; 2009–2011	Succeeded by Roberto Henríquez
Preceded by Samuel Lewis Navarro	Vice-President of Panama; 2009–2014	Succeeded by Isabel Saint Malo
Preceded by Ricardo Martinelli	President of Panama; 2014–2019	Succeeded by Laurentino Cortizo
