= Rubén Arosemena =

Panamanian politician (born 1961)

Rubén Arosemena Valdés (born 11 April 1961) is a Panamanian politician. He served as the President of the National Assembly from 2001 to 2002. He was the Second Vice President of Panama in the Martín Torrijos administration from 2004 to 2009.

Political offices
Preceded by Dominador Baldomero Bazán	Second Vice President of Panama; 2004–2009	Succeeded by Juan Carlos Varela (as single Vice President)
