= Laurentino Cortizo =

President of Panama from 2019 to 2024

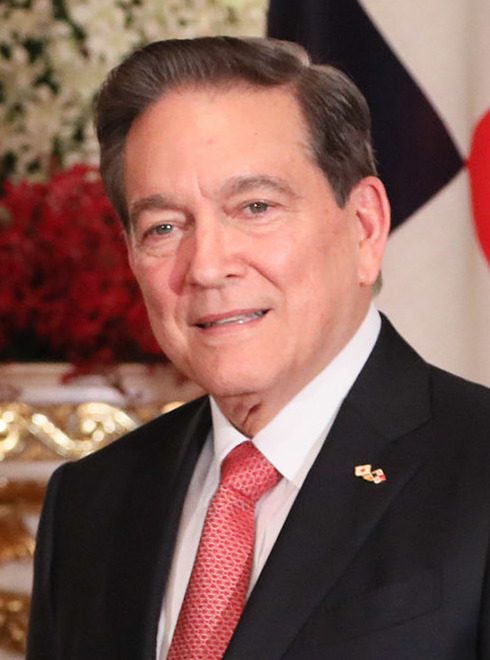
- Cortizo in 2019

38th President of Panama
- In office 1 July 2019 – 1 July 2024
- Vice President: José Gabriel Carrizo
- Preceded by: Juan Carlos Varela
- Succeeded by: José Raúl Mulino

38th President of the National Assembly
- In office 1 September 2000 – 31 August 2001
- Preceded by: Enrique Garrido
- Succeeded by: Rubén Arosemena
Ministerial offices
Minister of Agricultural Development
In office 1 September 2004 – 10 January 2006
| President | Martín Torrijos |
| Preceded by | Lynette Stanziola |
| Succeeded by | Guillermo Salazar |

Personal details
- Born: 30 January 1953 (age 73) Panama City, Panama
- Party: Solidarity Party (1983–2004); Democratic Revolutionary Party (2004–present)
- Spouse: Yazmín Colón de Cortizo
- Children: 2
- Education: Norwich University (B.B.A.); St. Edward's University (M.B.A.); University of Texas at Austin

Laurentino "Nito" Cortizo Cohen (Spanish pronunciation: [lawɾenˈtino koɾˈtiso ˈko.en]; born 30 January 1953) is a Panamanian politician who served as the 38th President of Panama from 2019 to 2024. Previously, he served as President of the National Assembly (2000–2001) and Minister of Agricultural and Livestock Development (2004–2006). Cortizo was a member of the National Assembly for Colón Province from 1994 to 2004.

A member of the Democratic Revolutionary Party, he was elected as president in the 2019 general election, winning 33.27% of the vote. He took office on 1 July 2019.

== Early life and education ==
Laurentino Cortizo Cohen was born in Panama City to Laurentino Cortizo, a Galician from Beariz, Spain, and Esther Cohen, of Jewish descent.

The eldest of six siblings, Cortizo attended Javier Elementary School and completed his secondary education at La Salle College in Diriamba, Nicaragua. He went on to attend the Valley Forge Military Academy in Pennsylvania. After this, he studied at Norwich University in Vermont, the oldest military college in the United States. Cortizo then attended St. Edward's University, earning a master's degree in business administration, and the University of Texas at Austin, where he did doctoral work.

== Early career ==
After graduation, Cortizo moved to Washington, D.C., in 1981 to work as a technical advisor to the secretary-general of the Organization of American States (OAS).

In November 1986, Cortizo assumed the role of Panama's alternate ambassador to the OAS. During that time, he was a member of the budget committee and of the working group for the private sector. In addition, Cortizo chaired the working group for development problems of the states of the Central American isthmus and the permanent executive committee of the economic and social council.

== Political career ==
Cortizo served as a member of the National Assembly from 1994 to 2004 and is described as being from the centrist wing of his party. He became President of the National Assembly in 2000, serving until 2001.

He also served as Minister of Agricultural and Livestock Development under President Martín Torrijos, however he resigned in 2006 due to his objections to the negotiations made in pursuit of the US-Panama Free Trade Agreement.

== Personal life ==
Cortizo is married to Yazmín Colón de Cortizo. They have two children, Carolina and Jorge. Carolina is currently the director of Wingo that is part of Copa Airlines.

In June 2022, Cortizo was diagnosed with myelodysplastic syndrome.

Cortizo is a devout Catholic and often reads the Bible.

Political offices
| Preceded by Enrique Garrido | President of the National Assembly; 2000–2001 | Succeeded by Rubén Arosemena |
| Preceded by Lynette Stanziola | Minister of Agricultural Development; 2004–2006 | Succeeded by Guillermo Salazar |
| Preceded by Juan Carlos Varela | President of Panama; 2019–2024 | Succeeded by José Raúl Mulino |
Party political offices
| Preceded by Juan Carlos Navarro | PRD nominee for President of Panama; 2019 | Most recent |
