= Democratic Change (Panama) =

Democratic Change Cambio Democrático
- President: Yanibel Ábrego
- Founder: Ricardo Martinelli
- Founded: May 20, 1998
- Headquarters: Parque Lefevre, Plaza Carolina, Panama City, Panama
- Membership (2025): 265,932
- Ideology: Conservatism; Economic liberalism; Populism
- Political position: Centre-right
- Regional affiliation: Center-Democratic Integration Group
- Continental affiliation: Union of Latin American Parties
- International affiliation: International Democracy Union
- Colours: Cyan, Magenta, White
- Seats in the National Assembly: 8 / 71
- District Mayors: 20 / 81
- Corregimiento Representatives: 0 / 702
- Seats in the Central American Parliament (Panamanian seats): 0 / 20

Party flag

Website
- cambiodemocratico.org.pa

Democratic Change (Spanish: Cambio Democrático) is a centre-right political party in Panama.

The party was founded on May 20, 1998, by Ricardo Martinelli, owner of the Super 99 supermarket chain. At the end of 2013 the party listed more than 500,000 members, making it one of Panama's two largest parties with a membership almost equal to that of the Democratic Revolutionary Party.

In the legislative elections of May 3, 2009, the party won 23.4% of the popular vote and 14 out of 78 seats. In the presidential elections of the same year, the party leader, Ricardo Martinelli, was elected President of Panama with 59.97% of the vote.

The party's candidate for the presidential elections of 2014 was José Domingo Arias who led the opinion polls but lost to then vice-president Juan Carlos Varela of the Panameñista Party.

In January 2018, Rómulo Roux was elected as president of the party in place of Martinelli, who was detained in a federal prison in Miami at that time for corruption charges. Martinelli would later leave the party in 2020 after disputes over party leadership.

== Platform ==
The party's populist platform includes the support for a strong welfare state, notably programs like Cien a los Setenta for those older than 70 years old and Beca Universal for schoolchildren, mixed with free-market capitalism (similar to a social market economy). This includes measures to attract tourism and business through tax incentives as well as infrastructure investments, such as the expansion of the Panama Canal, highways and airports.

== Election results ==
=== Presidential elections ===
Election	Candidate	Votes		Vote %		Result
Election	Candidate	Party	Alliance Total	Party	Alliance Total	Result
1999	Mireya Moscoso	36,068	572,717	2.82	44.80	✓ Elected
2004	Ricardo Martinelli	79,491		5.30		✗ Lost
2009	Ricardo Martinelli	509,986	952,333	32.15	60.03	✓ Elected
2014	José Domingo Arias	483,309	581,828	26.07	31.38	✗ Lost
2019	Rómulo Roux	564,297	609,003	28.72	31.00	✗ Lost
2024	Rómulo Roux	138,274	258,818	6.08	11.38	✗ Lost

=== National Assembly elections ===
Election	Leader	Votes	%	Seats	+/–	Government
1999	Ricardo Martinelli	66,841	5.44% (#7)	2 / 71	New	Coalition
2004	Ricardo Martinelli	107,511	7.40% (#5)	3 / 78	▲1	Opposition
2009	Ricardo Martinelli	352,319	23.42% (#2)	14 / 71	▲11	Coalition
2014	Ricardo Martinelli	573,603	33.72% (#1)	30 / 71	▲16	Opposition
2019	Rómulo Roux	405,798	22.45% (#2)	18 / 71	▼12	Opposition
2024	Rómulo Roux	239,529	11.19% (#3)	8 / 71	▼10	Opposition

=== PARLACEN elections ===
The amount of seats allocated for the PARLACEN is based on the vote share obtained by each party in the presidential election.

Election	Leader	Votes	%	Seats	+/–
2019	Rómulo Roux	483,309	26.07% (#3)	7 / 20	
2024 (Note: Democratic Change did not field any candidate for PARLACEN in this election despite contesting the presidential one.)	Rómulo Roux	138,374	6.08% (#4)	0 / 20	▼7
