= José Domingo Arias =

Panamanian economist and politician

José Domingo Arias Villalaz
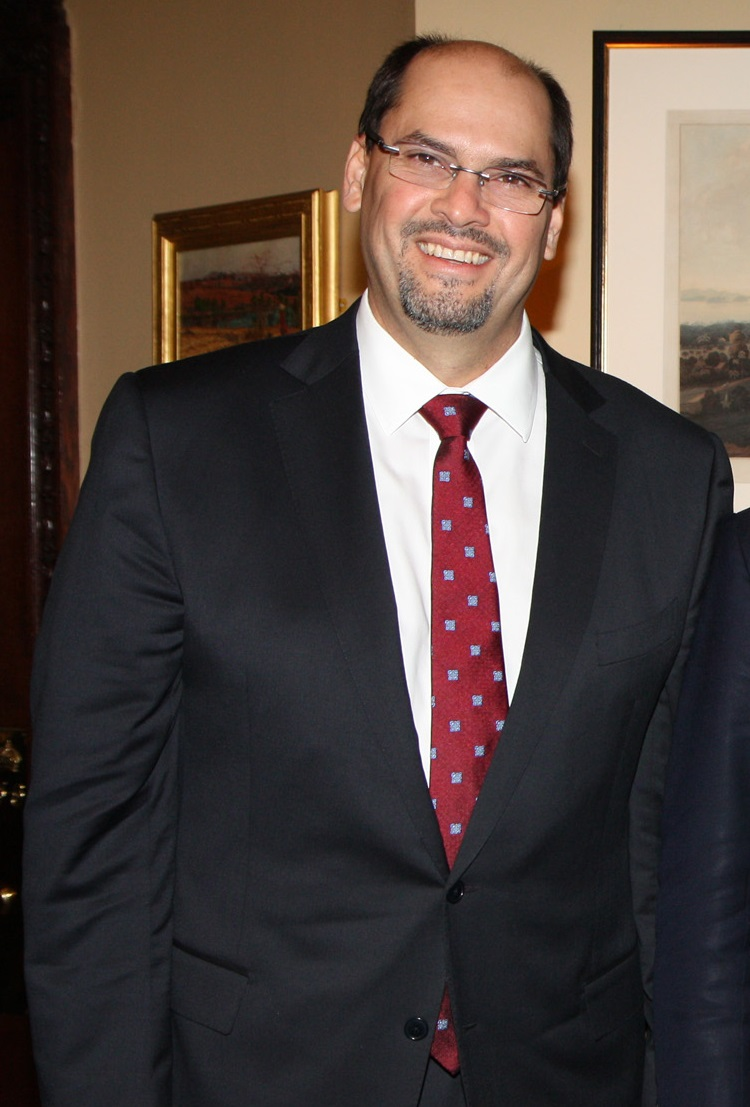

Personal details
- Born: 26 October 1963 (age 62) Panama City, Panama
- Party: Democratic Change
- Spouse: Aimée Álvarez
- Children: 3
- Education: University of Buenos Aires

José Domingo Arias Villalaz is a Panamanian economist and politician, and was an unsuccessful candidate in the 2014 presidential elections.

== Background and early life ==
José Domingo Arias was born on 26 October 1963 in Panama City. He is the son of Marta Graciela Villalaz Arias and Julio Rubén Arias Valdés. He has two siblings: Julio Rubén is the elder and Marta María is the younger.

His paternal grandfather, Aurelio Arias, was a deputy in the National Constituent Assembly in 1946. His uncles, Bernardino and Sergio González Ruiz, both served as Ministers of State and Acting Presidents under Roberto F. Chiari. His father was a businessman in the transport sector, and his mother graduated in dentistry at the University of Buenos Aires.

Arias passed his childhood in the capital. He had five years of primary education at the Javier School, a Jesuit institution, then passed on to the Pedagogic High School to complete his secondary education. The summer holidays were always spent in the city of Las Tablas and in the countryside at Villa de Los Santos, which belonged to his mother's family.

Like his mother, Arias went on to study at the University of Buenos Aires, where he was in contact with leading Argentine intellectuals and economists who had returned to the university at the end of the military dictatorship.

His working life began in the clothing industry as a salesman soon rising to an executive position in the company. He was instrumental in developing the firm's trade with more than 12 neighboring countries.

He is married to Aimée Álvarez and they currently (2013) have three children: David José, aged 19; Juan Enrique, 14; and Isabella, 10.

== Political career ==
In 2006 he joined the Cambio Democrático party, in which he assisted in formulating the plan for government, and acted as campaign spokesman. When that party's candidate Ricardo Martinelli became President in 2009 he offered Arias a Cabinet post as minister for foreign trade. In this position he set up the PROINVEX governmental agency for attracting investment and promoting exports. In 2010 he organised a series of conferences - PANAMAINVEST - in the capitals of major trading nations with the aim of promoting direct foreign investment. He worked to enhance the effectiveness of the office dealing with local headquarters of multinational companies, reducing management expenses and certifying its work by ISO 9001 quality standards. Among other tasks he also drew up a new law concerning Free Trade Zones.

In 2011 President Martinelli appointed Arias as Minister of Housing and Land Management. Here his first task was to carry through the Proyecto Curundú urban renovation project. He went on to build up the Piso y Techo (Eng: Floor and Roof) programme, aimed at improving the living conditions of poor families living in dwellings with earth floors, mainly in rural areas. He built the first barrio digital (digital neighbourhood), with wireless internet access in every dwelling. He also instituted a process of certifying the main directorates within his Ministry to ISO 9001 standards.

He stepped down from his ministerial position on 15 February 2014, to concentrate on his presidential campaign.

== Presidential candidate 2014 ==
In May 2013 Arias competed in the primaries for nomination by his party, Cambio Democrático, as presidential candidate for the presidential election of 2014. He won these primaries with 67% of the vote. Two months before the election, in early March 2014, Arias was reported to be leading in opinion polls. This was analysed as part of a pattern in most of Latin America whereby the political tendency currently in power, whether of the left or (as in Panama) the right and centre-right, was considered likely to remain in power through elections in the 2014-16 period.

Following the elections on 4 May 2014 the Electoral Commission declared vice-president Juan Carlos Varela the winner of the presidential contest, with about 39% of the vote against 32% for Arias.
