= 2014 Panamanian general election =

- 4 May 2014
- Presidential election
- Turnout: 76.76% (▲2.75pp)
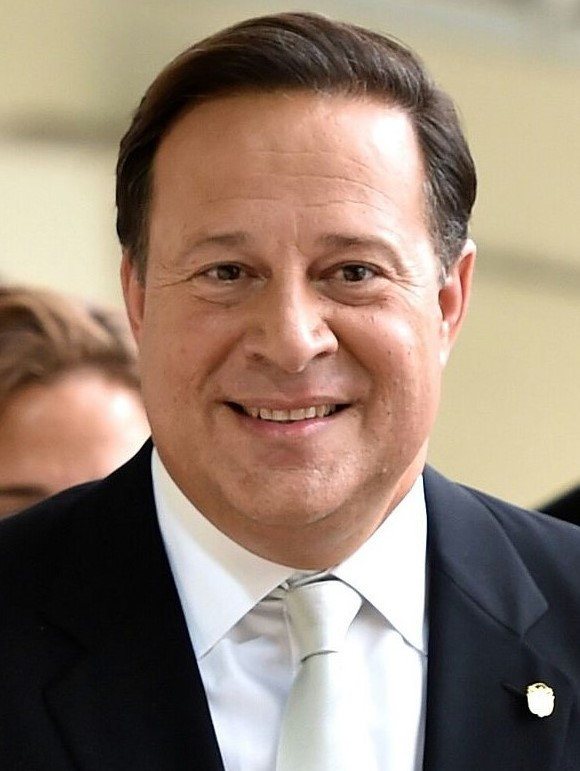

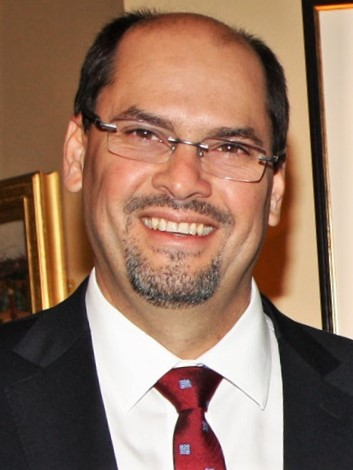

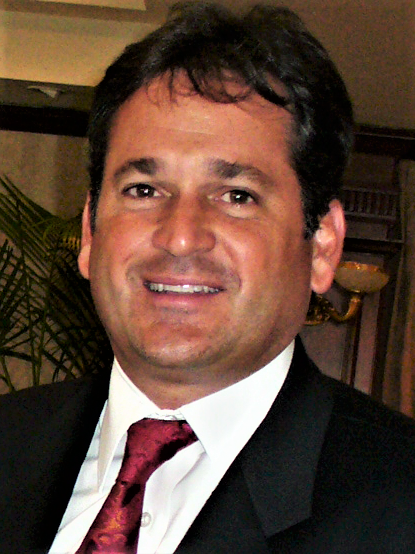
Nominee	Juan Carlos Varela	José Domingo Arias	Juan Carlos Navarro
Party	Panameñista	CD	PRD
Running mate	Isabel Saint Malo	Marta Linares de Martinelli	Gerardo Solís
Popular vote	724,762	581,828	521,842
Percentage	39.09%	31.38%	28.14%
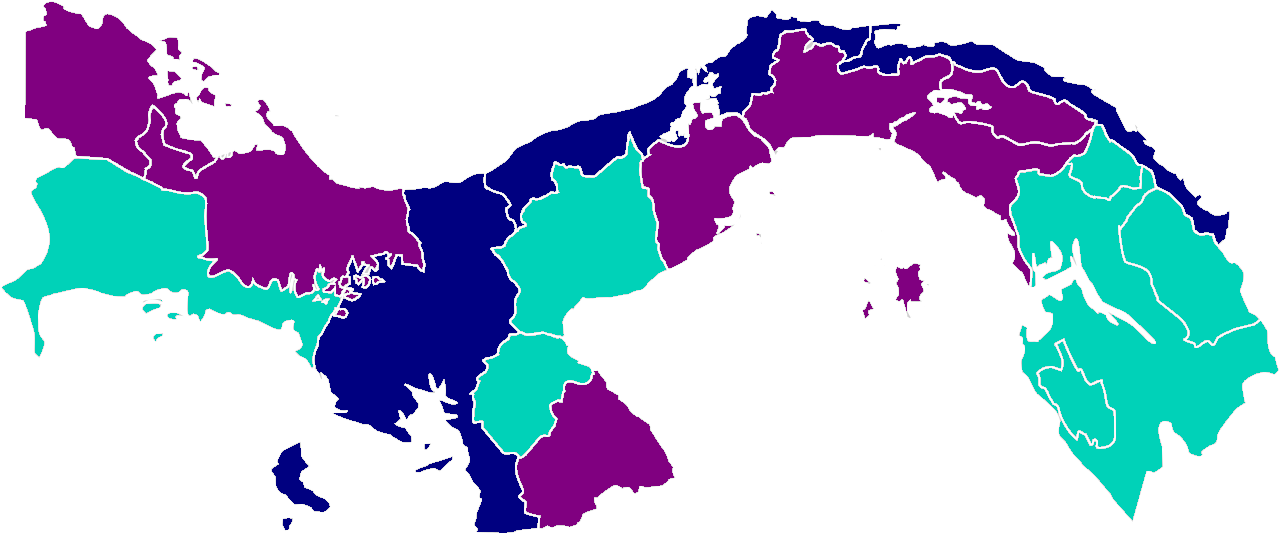
- Results by province
President before election
Ricardo Martinelli
CD
Elected President
Juan Carlos Varela
Panameñista

General elections were held in Panama on 4 May 2014. Due to constitutional term limits, Incumbent President Ricardo Martinelli was ineligible for a second consecutive term. Incumbent Vice President Juan Carlos Varela of the Partido Panameñista won the election with 39% of the votes.

== Electoral system ==
Of the 71 members of the National Assembly, 26 were elected in single-member constituencies and 45 by proportional representation in multi-member constituencies. Each district with more than 40,000 inhabitants forms a constituency. Constituencies elect one MP for every 30,000 residents and an additional representative for every fraction over 10,000.

In single-member constituencies MPs are elected using the first-past-the-post system. In multi-member constituencies MPs are elected using party list proportional representation according to a double quotient; the first allocation of seats uses a simple quotient, further seats are allotted using the quotient divided by two, with any remaining seats are awarded to the parties with the greatest remainder.

== Presidential candidates ==
Seven candidates contested the election:

- José Domingo Arias – Cambio Democrático (CD), a former minister in Martinelli's government
- Juan Carlos Navarro - Democratic Revolutionary Party (PRD), former mayor of Panama City
- Juan Carlos Varela - Panameñista Party, incumbent Vice President
- Genaro López - Broad Front for Democracy (FAD), former General Secretary of the SUNTRACS union
- Juan Jované - Independent, former head of the Social Security administration, and a left-wing economist
- Esteban Rodríguez - Independent
- Gerardo Barroso - Independent

== Opinion polls ==
Poll source	Date	José Domingo Arias (CD)	Juan Carlos Navarro (PRD)	Juan Carlos Varela (Panameñista)
Dichter & Neira	March 2014	39%	32%	26%
Ipsos	March 2014	33%	31%	26%
Dichter & Neira	23 April 2014	35%	30%	32%
Ipsos	23 April 2014	33.9%	34.2%	29.1%

== Results ==
=== President ===
Candidate	Party or alliance		Votes	%
Juan Carlos Varela	The People First	Panameñista Party	563,584	30.39
Juan Carlos Varela	The People First	People's Party	161,178	8.69
Juan Carlos Varela	The People First	Total	724,762	39.09
José Domingo Arias	United for Change	Democratic Change	483,309	26.07
José Domingo Arias	United for Change	Nationalist Republican Liberal Movement	98,519	5.31
José Domingo Arias	United for Change	Total	581,828	31.38
Juan Carlos Navarro	Democratic Revolutionary Party		521,842	28.14
Genaro López	Broad Front for Democracy		11,127	0.60
Juan Jované	Independent		10,805	0.58
Esteban Rodríguez	Independent		2,240	0.12
Gerardo Barroso	Independent		1,598	0.09
Total			1,854,202	100.00
Valid votes			1,854,202	98.30
Invalid/blank votes			32,106	1.70
Total votes			1,886,308	100.00
Registered voters/turnout			2,457,401	76.76
Source: Election Tribunal, Electoral Tribunal

=== National Assembly ===
Party	Votes	%	Seats	+/–
Democratic Change	573,603	33.72	30	+16
Democratic Revolutionary Party	535,747	31.49	25	–1
Panameñista Party	343,880	20.22	12	–10
Nationalist Republican Liberal Movement	121,815	7.16	2	0
People's Party	56,629	3.33	1	0
Broad Front for Democracy	17,224	1.01	0	New
Independents	52,184	3.07	1	–1
Total	1,701,082	100.00	71	0
Valid votes	1,701,082	92.06		
Invalid/blank votes	146,718	7.94		
Total votes	1,847,800	100.00		
Registered voters/turnout	2,457,401	75.19		
Source: Election Tribunal

Although Democratic Change won 30 seats and MOLIRENA two, rival candidates in 10 of the circuits won by CD and 1 of those won by MOLIRENA said there were irregularities throughout the elections that favored the winning parties. As such, the Electoral Tribunal of Panama annulled the results in those circuits and new special elections were to be held every Sunday from 16 November 2014 to determine which candidate would win those 11 seats.

Special election results
Election Date	Circuit	Candidate	Party
16 November 2014	7-1	Carlos "Tito" Afú	Democratic Change (CD)
23 November 2014	2-4	Noriel Salerno	Democratic Change (CD)
30 November 2014	7-2	Mariela Vega	Democratic Change (CD)
14 December 2014	4-1	Miguel Fanovich	Nationalist Republican Liberal Movement (MOLIRENA)
14 December 2014	4-1	Florentino Ábrego	Panameñista Party
