= Marco Ameglio =

Panamanian politician and businessman

Marco Antonio Ameglio Samudio (born 1961) is a Panamanian politician and businessman.

He served as the President of the National Assembly from 1991 to 1992. Ameglio has been on the Panama Canal Authority Board of Directors since March 23, 2010. He was sworn for a period of 9 years.

Party political offices
Preceded by Mireya Moscoso	President of the Panameñista Party; 2005-2006	Succeeded by Juan Carlos Varela
