= José Isabel Blandón Figueroa =

Panamanian politician (born 1967)

José Isabel Blandón
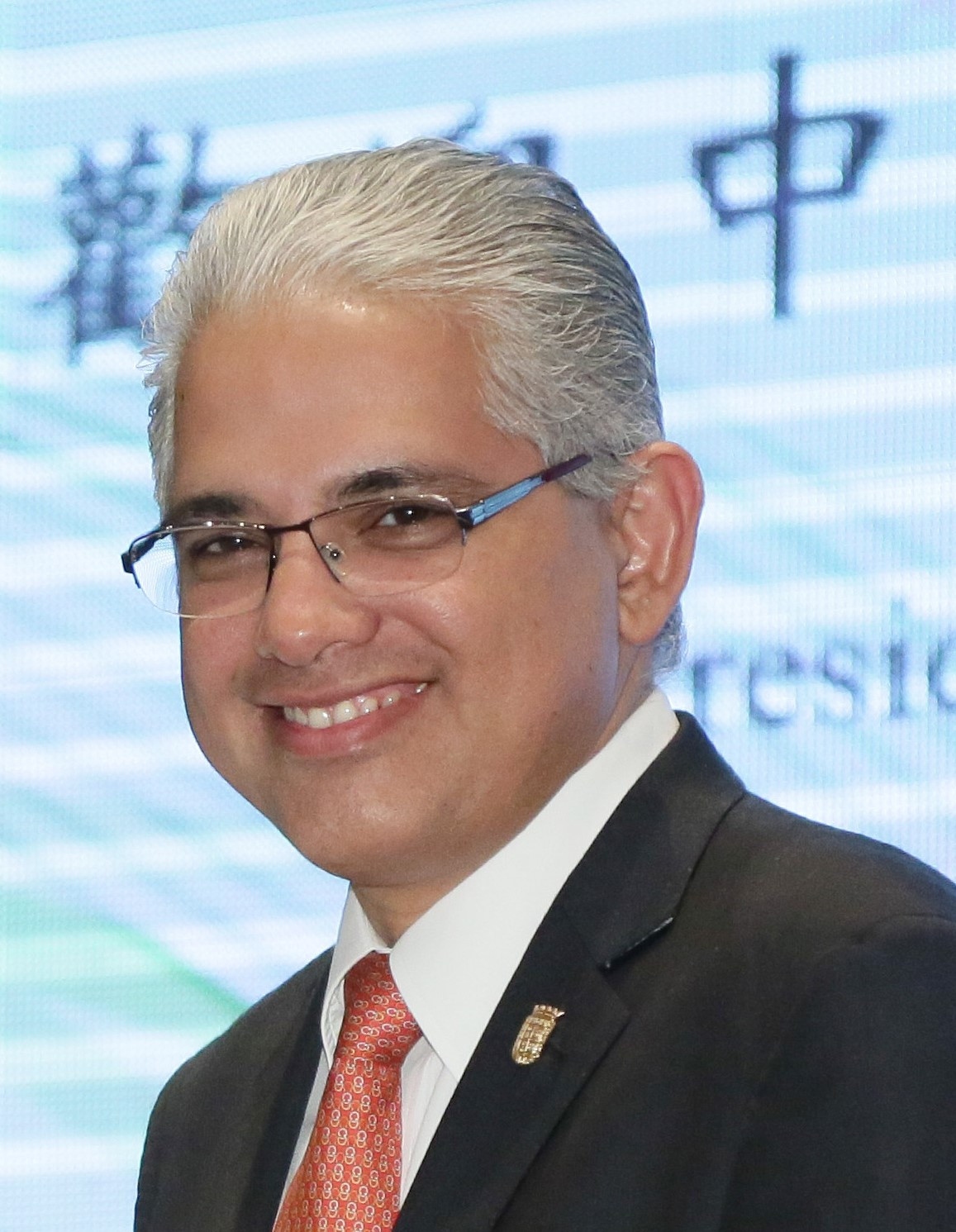
- José Isabel Blandón in 2016

Mayor of Panama City
- In office 1 July 2014 – 1 July 2019
- Preceded by: Roxana Méndez
- Succeeded by: José Luis Fábrega

Member of the National Assembly
- In office 1994–2010

Personal details
- Born: José Isabel Blandón Figueroa; 7 July 1967 (age 59) Chitré, Panama
- Party: Panameñista Party
- Spouse: Yamileth Araúz de Blandón
- Children: 4
- Parent: José Isabel Blandón Castillo (father)
- Education: University of Panama
- Occupation: Lawyer • Politician

José Isabel Blandón Figueroa (born 7 July 1967) is a Panamanian politician, and a member of the National Assembly for the Panameñista Party (previously named Arnulfista Party) between 1994 and 2010. From 2011 to 2014 he was in opposition to the government of Ricardo Martinelli, and in 2013 was chosen as the Panameñista Party candidate for Mayor of Panama City, winning the party primary election with 97% of the vote. The son of José Isabel Blandón Castillo, his disapproval of his father's position as a top aide to Manuel Noriega helped push his father to defecting in the late 1980s.
