= Politics of Panama =

The politics of Panama take place in a framework of a presidential representative democratic republic with a multi-party system, whereby the President of Panama is both head of state and head of the government of Panama.

Executive power is exercised by the president. Legislative power is vested in the National Assembly. The Judiciary is independent of the executive and the legislature. The branches are according to Panama's Political Constitution of 1972, reformed by the Actos Reformatorios of 1978 and the Acto Constitucional of 1983, united in cooperation and limited through a system of checks and balances.

Three independent organizations with clearly defined responsibilities are found in the constitution: the Comptroller General of the Republic has the responsibility to manage public funds; the Electoral Tribunal has the responsibility to guarantee liberty, transparency, and the efficacy of the popular vote; and the Ministry of the Public oversees interests of State and of the municipalities.

== Executive branch ==
Office	Name	Party	Since
President	José Raúl Mulino	Realizing Goals	July 1, 2024
Vice President	Vacant		

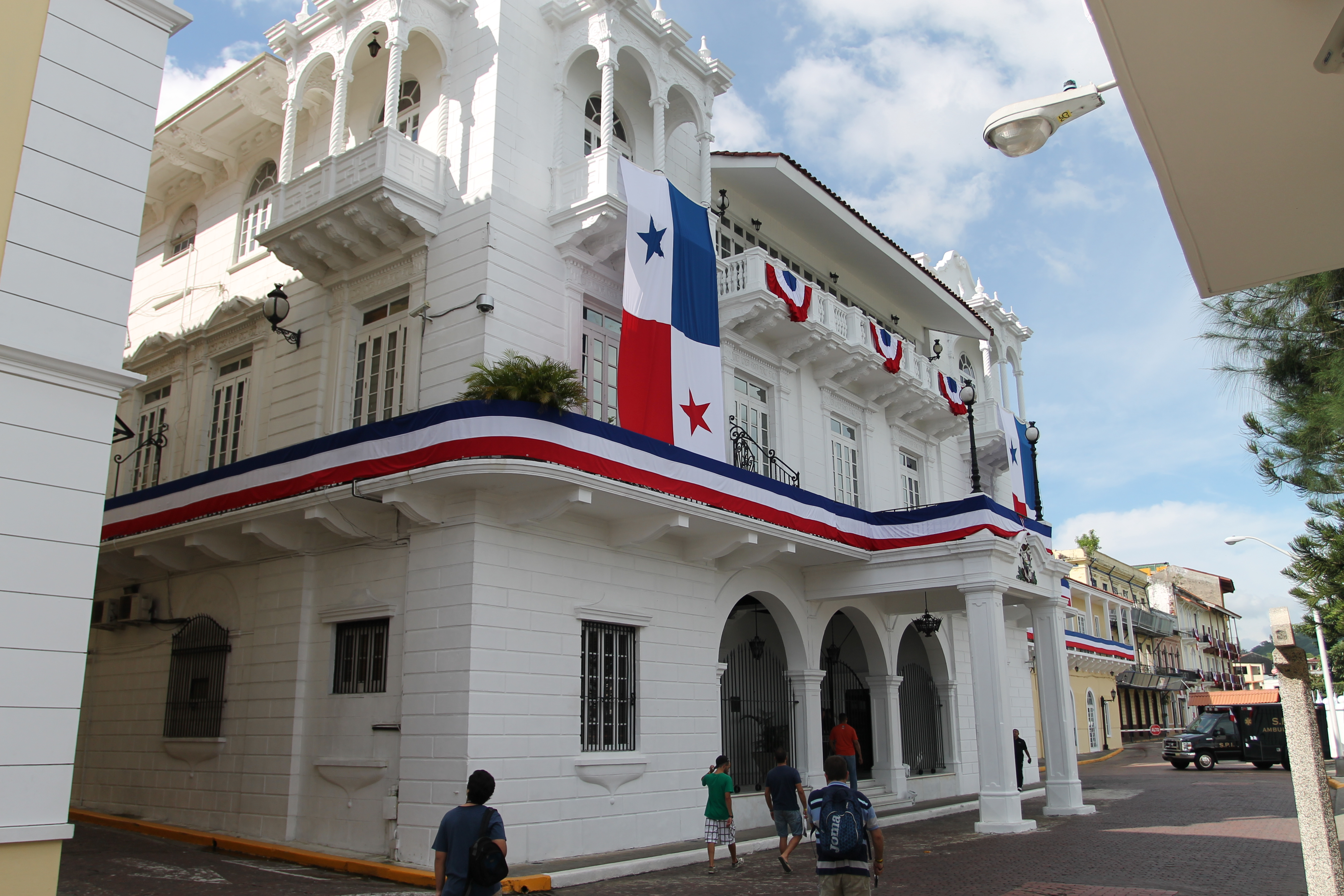
Palacio de las Garzas

The Executive Branch includes a president and one vice president. The president and vice-president are elected on a single ballot for a five-year term by direct popular vote. Presidents are not allowed to immediately run for re-election, but can run again after waiting five years.

=== State Ministers ===
- Minister of Agricultural and Livestock Development: Roberto José Linares
- Minister for Canal Affairs: José Ramón Icaza
- Minister of Commerce and Industries: Julio Moltó
- Minister of Culture: Maruja Herrera
- Minister of Economy and Finance: Felipe Chapman
- Minister of Education: Ventura Vega Osorio
- Minister of Environment: Juan Carlos Navarro
- Minister of Foreign Affairs: Javier Martínez-Acha
- Minister of Health: Fernando Boyd Galindo
- Minister of Housing and Territorial Planning: Jaime Jované
- Minister of Government: Dinoska Montalvo
- Minister of the Presidency: Juan Carlos Orillac
- Minister of Public Security: Frank Alexis Ábrego
- Minister of Public Works: José Luis Andrade
- Minister of Social Development: Beatriz Carles Arango
- Minister of the Woman: Niurka Palacios
- Minister of Work and Labor Development: Jackeline Muñoz
- Attorney General: Luis Carlos Manuel Gómez Rudy
- Manager, National Bank of Panama: Javier Carrizo
- Permanent Representative to the United Nations, New York: Eloy Alfaro de Alba

(Source: CIA World Factbook: World Leaders, Panama)

== Legislative Branch ==
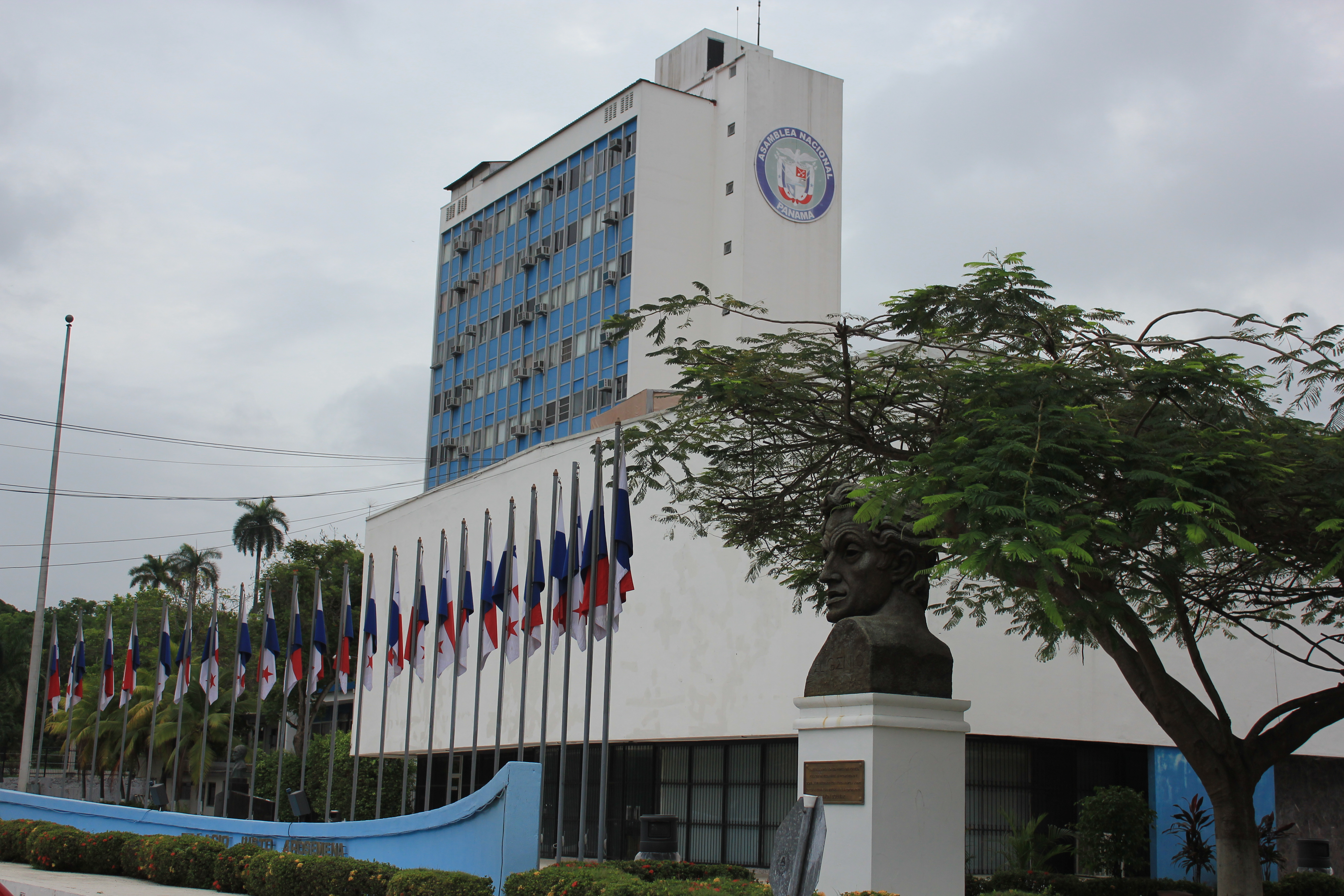
The National Assembly of Panama.

The legislative branch consists of a unicameral National Assembly (Asamblea Nacional), composed of 71 members elected to five-year terms from single- and multi-seat constituencies.

== Judiciary ==
The Judicial Organ administers justice in a permanent, free and expeditious manner. It comprises the Supreme Court of Justice, the Tribunals, and the judges established by law, according to the constitution of Panama (title VII, chapter 1).

== Elections ==
An autonomous Electoral Tribunal supervises voter registration, the election process, and the activities of political parties. Everyone over the age of 18 is required to vote, although those who fail to do so are not penalized.

== Political culture ==
Panamanians have been working to root out the after-effects of several decades of military rule since the country's return to democracy in 1989. In 2020, it was reported that Panama loses approximately 1% of its GDP every year to corruption, including government corruption. However, the country is working to improve its democracy, and in July 2020, two ex-presidents of the country (Ricardo Martinelli and Juan Carlos Varela) were questioned over their involvement in the Odebrecht bribery scandal. Martinelli was eventually released after being found not guilty, but was subsequently re-arrested on charges of money laundering. Two sons of Martinelli (Luis Enrique and Ricardo Alberto Martinelli) were also charged with bribery and money laundering by the United States. In August 2020, Panama joined forces with the United States to form a joint task force to root out money laundering.

However, despite the work being done, much still remains to be accomplished, and the International Trade Administration notes that corruption remains the largest hurdle for businesses wanting to invest in the country.

== See also ==
- Foreign relations of Panama
