= Broad Front for Democracy =

Broad Front for Democracy Frente Amplio por la Democracia
- Abbreviation: FAD
- Leader: Genaro López, Fernando Cebamanos (2013–2019); Maribel Gordón (2025–present)
- Founder: Frenadeso
- Founded: 2013; 2018 (refounded); 2025 (refounded)
- Dissolved: 2014 (First Time); 2019 (Second Time)
- Membership (2026): 47,460
- Ideology: Socialism; Indigenismo
- Political position: Left-wing
- Colours: Red, white
- Seats in the National Assembly: 0 / 71

Website
- www.partido-fad.com

The Broad Front for Democracy (Spanish: Frente Amplio por la Democracia) is a Panamanian political party originally founded in 2013.

At the 2014 Panamanian general election, the candidate's party was Genaro López for the Presidency. At the legislative election, the party had 1.0% votes and no seats.

The party dissolved in 2014, was re-founded in 2018 and dissolved again in 2019.

The party attempted to reconstitute a third time starting in 2020–2021, gathering signatures over several years. On 24 August 2025, it held a national convention formally re-establishing itself as a party, electing economist and 2024 independent presidential candidate Maribel Gordón as its president. On 17 October 2025, Panama's Electoral Tribunal issued Resolution No. 11, officially recognizing the FAD as a legally constituted political party. with the goal of contesting the 2029 general election.
