= Democratic Revolutionary Party =

Democratic Revolutionary Party Partido Revolucionario Democrático
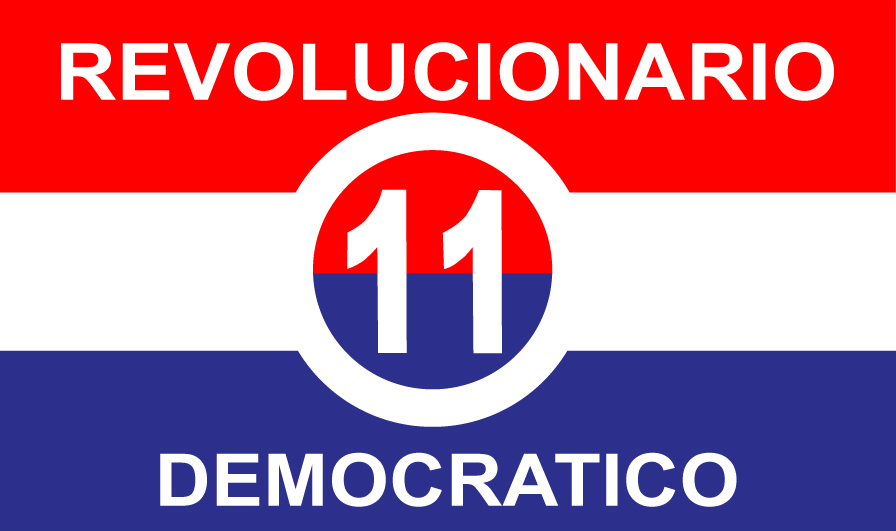
- President: Benicio Robinson
- Secretary-General: Carlos Pérez Herrera
- Founder: Omar Torrijos
- Founded: 11 October 1979; 47 years ago
- Headquarters: Azteca Building, Mexico Avenue, Panama City, Panama
- Membership (2025): ▼599,496
- Ideology: Social democracy Left-wing populism Social conservatism Third Way; 1979–1981: Socialism; Third Worldism; Economic populism Nationalism; Populism; Progressivism; Anti-imperialism
- Political position: Centre-left; 1979–1981: Left-wing
- Regional affiliation: Center-Democratic Integration Group and Parliamentary Group of the Left
- Continental affiliation: São Paulo Forum; COPPPAL
- International affiliation: Socialist International
- Colours: Blue, red, white
- National Assembly: 12 / 71
- District Mayors: 28 / 81
- Corregimiento Representatives: 284 / 701
- Central American Parliament (Panamanian seats): 1 / 20

Website
- prdespanama.com

The Democratic Revolutionary Party (Spanish: Partido Revolucionario Democrático, PRD) is a centre-left political party in Panama founded in 1979 by General Omar Torrijos. To date, it has been the party of four Panamian presidents: Nicolás Ardito Barletta Vallarino (1984–1985), Ernesto Pérez Balladares (1994–1999), Martin Torrijos (2004–2009) and Laurentino Cortizo (2019–2024).

== History ==
Since its creation, the party had strong ties with the military regime that ruled Panama since the military coup of 1968. Most of its members identified with Torrijos's social policy and the legacy of the Canal Treaties signed a few years before his death. Domestic and international political pressure orchestrated by Torrijos against the United States was viewed as nationalist. Despite his aggressive methods, Torrijos is recognized as one of the most popular leaders Panama has ever had.

With the signing of the Canal Treaties, Torrijos committed to restoring at least nominal civilian rule to Panama. To do so, he created the PRD as his political vehicle, and filed to run for president in the 1984 elections against the man he had overthrown in 1968, Arnulfo Arias.

With Torrijos's death, the military regime ruling the country fell into a crisis of power. After his unclear death, two generals resigned before Manuel Noriega took power. The political scenario changed drastically, and Noriega began to persecute politicians who opposed him, ruling the country by fear and terror.

The situation in the country deteriorated under Noriega's rule. The 1985 assassination of dissident Hugo Spadafora generated the beginning of the political turmoil that ended in 1989 with the US invasion of Panama.

The PRD was manipulated by Noriega. There were many secretaries of the party, the most famous being Ramito Vasquez Chambonet at the beginning and Darinel Espino in the end. Noriega also named presidents, ministries, legislators, and other government positions loyal to him. This created a deep crisis inside the party, which did not have inner democracy until the reforms after the US invasion.

Since democracy was restored in 1990, PRD politicians have restructured the party by increasing member participation and, for the first time, holding primaries to elect representatives for government positions. It was the first party in Panama that underwent such restructuring and was viewed as the most organized and biggest political party in the country. The restructuring was led by Ernesto Perez Balladares, Francisco Sanchez, Mitchell Doens, Tomas G. Duque, and Gerardo Gonzalez. In 1991 part of this staff met Arias Calderon, then vice president of Panama, to make clear their interest in forming a political opposition and not a military.

The 1993 PRD presidential nomination election was between Ernesto Perez Balladares and Alfredo Oranges, who won 66% and 33% of the vote respectively. Perez Balladares won the presidential elections against Mireya Moscoso and a PRD-majority legislature in 1994.

The PRD lost the 1999 elections. Differences between Perez Balladares and presidential candidate Martín Torrijos, who also beat Oranges in the inner presidential race, made an unclear political offer for this election that ended with Mireya Moscoso's being elected president and the PRD's controlling the assembly.

Once the elections finished, the committee led by Perez Balladares resigned, and Martín Torrijos was elected secretary. This period under Martin Torrijos' leadership was managed by "youngers" who improved well. The political mistakes by Moscoso's government opened a path for Torrijos, who easily won the presidential race in 2004.

In the 2004 general election, Martín Torrijos won the presidency with 47.4% of the vote, running as the candidate for the Patria Nueva ("New Fatherland") electoral alliance between the PRD and the smaller People's Party (PP). In the same election, the party won 37.8% of the popular vote and 41 out of 78 seats in the National Assembly of Panama.

The 2008 primaries were won by Balbina Herrera (Party President Member) against Juan Carlos Navarro. The differences between Herrera and Navarro were so deep that they ended with a non-unified party, once again leading the PRD to lose the presidential race led by Balbina Herrera in 2009.

The committee resigned in October 2009, and a new committee was elected on 18 October. The elections ended with the election of President Francisco Sanchez Cardenas and Secretary Mitchell Doens.

=== Navarro and the new PRD ===
Starting in late 2012 the PRD began the democratic process of renovating all of their internal political structures, from delegates to executive committee members.

In a fiery and passionate speech in March 2012, Juan Carlos Navarro called for all members to join him and his Ola Azul movement in forming a new PRD to ensure the party's victory in the 2014 elections. In August 2012, the 4,200 delegates of the National Congress convened to elect a new executive committee; the result was a decisive victory by Navarro and the Ola Azul movement, which won all 10 seats of the executive committee, with Navarro elected secretary-general. This was the first time in the party's history that one candidate was able to win all seats of the executive committee.

Primaries were held in March 2013, with 17 candidates taking part in the process. Juan Carlos Navarro won 95% of the vote and was elected as the party's presidential candidate for the 2014 general election.

The 2014 general election saw former vice-president and Panameñista Party candidate Juan Carlos Varela elected President with 39% of the vote. Juan Carlos Navarro and the PRD came a distant third in the general election, this is considered the worst election result in the history of the party. As a result of this, Navarro resigned his post as secretary-general, quickly followed by 4 other members.

A new election was held in order to fill the five vacant spots in the Executive Committee and San Francisco Councilman Carlos Perez Herrera was elected as secretary general. It won the 2019 election with its fielded candidate Laurentino Cortizo becoming president in a close race.

== Election results ==
=== Presidential elections ===
Year	Candidate	Votes		Vote %		Result
Year	Candidate	Party	Alliance total	Party	Alliance total	Result
1984	Nicolás Ardito Barletta	175,722	300,748	27.45	46.98	✓ Elected
1989	Carlos Alberto Duque Jaén	120,564	184,900	18.52	28.40	✗ Lost
1994	Ernesto Pérez Balladares	326,095	355,307	30.57	33.30	✓ Elected
1999	Martin Torrijos	402,418	481,988	31.57	37.82	✗ Lost
2004	Martin Torrijos	649,157	711,164	43.29	47.44	✓ Elected
2009	Balbina Herrera	553,974	584.931	34.92	37.54	✗ Lost
2014	Juan Carlos Navarro	521,842		31.38		✗ Lost
2019	Laurentino Cortizo	609,638	655,302	31.03	33.35	✓ Elected
2024	José Gabriel Carrizo	126,454	133,791	5.56	5.88	✗ Lost

=== National Assembly elections ===
Election	Leader	Votes	%	Seats	+/–	Presidency	
1980	Omar Torrijos		40.4% (#1)	11 / 57	New	—N/a	—N/a
1984	Manuel Noriega	153,182	25.14% (#1)	34 / 67	▲23	Nicolás Ardito Barletta	
1989	Carlos Duque	114,741	18.83% (#3)	10 / 67	▼24	Guillermo Endara	Ind.
1994	Ernesto Pérez Balladares	236,319	22.86% (#1)	30 / 72	▲20	Ernesto Pérez Balladares	
1999	Ernesto Pérez Balladares	393,356	31.99% (#1)	34 / 71	▲4	Mireya Moscoso	
2004	Martin Torrijos	549,948	37.85% (#1)	41 / 78	▲7	Martin Torrijos	
2009	Balbina Herrera	537,426	35.72% (#1)	26 / 71	▼15	Ricardo Martinelli	
2014	Juan Carlos Navarro	535,747	31.49% (#2)	25 / 71	▼1	Juan Carlos Varela	
2019	Benicio Robinson	542,105	29.99% (#1)	35 / 71	▲10	Laurentino Cortizo	
2024	Benicio Robinson	347,692	16.25% (#2)	13 / 71	▼22	José Raúl Mulino	

=== PARLACEN elections ===
The amount of seats allocated for the PARLACEN is based on the vote share obtained by each party in the presidential election.

Election	Leader	Votes	%	Seats	+/–
2019	Benicio Robinson	609,638	31.03% (#1)	7 / 20	
2024	Benicio Robinson	126,454	5.56% (#5)	1 / 20	▼6
