= Ricardo Martinelli =

President of Panama from 2009 to 2014

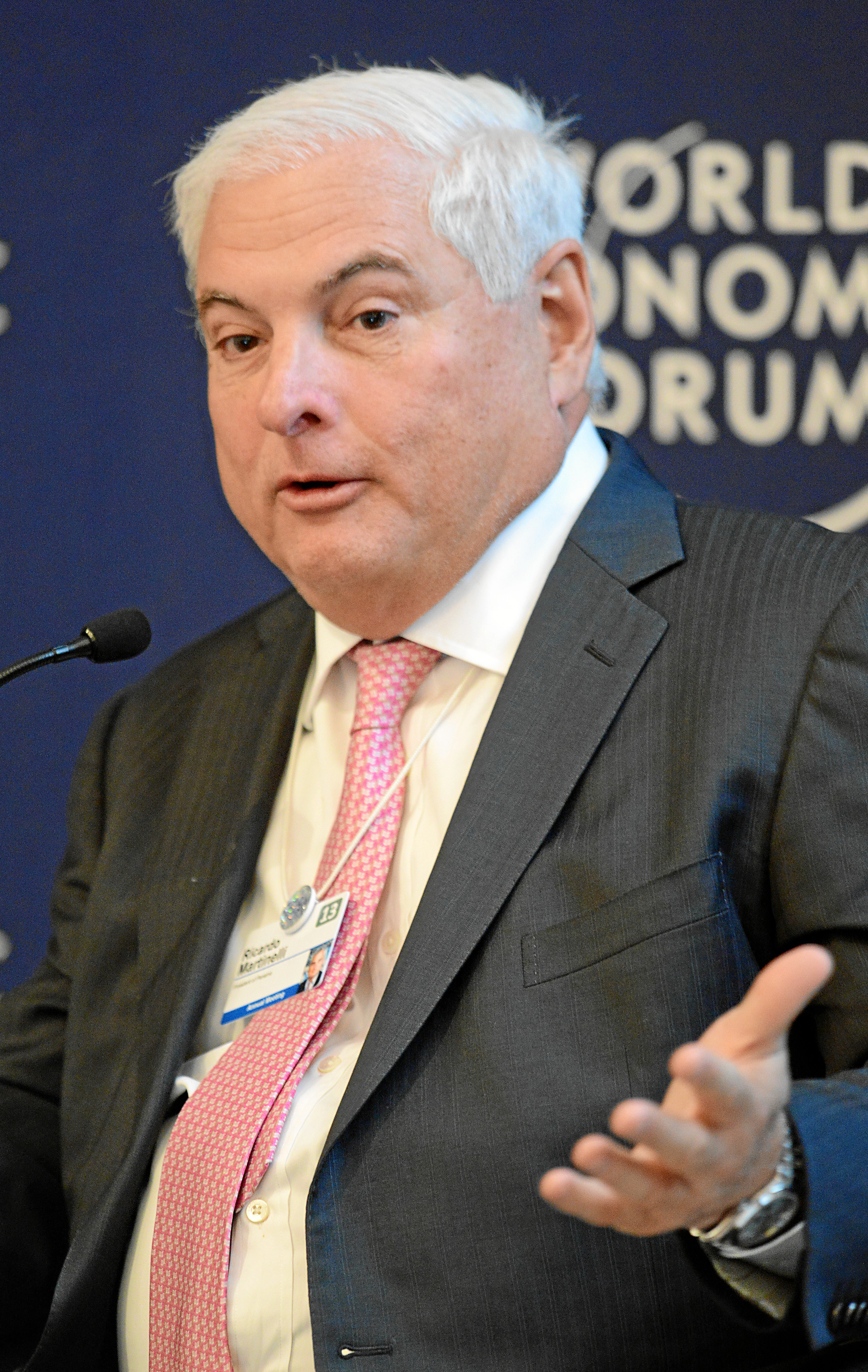
- Martinelli in 2013

36th President of Panama
- In office 1 July 2009 – 1 July 2014
- Vice President: Juan Carlos Varela
- Preceded by: Martín Torrijos
- Succeeded by: Juan Carlos Varela

Personal details
- Born: Ricardo Alberto Martinelli Berrocal; 11 March 1951 (age 75) Panama City, Panama
- Party: Democratic Change (until 2020); Realizing Goals (2021–present)
- Spouse: Marta Linares (1978–present)
- Education: University of Arkansas (BSBA)
- Religion: Roman Catholicism

Ricardo Alberto Martinelli Berrocal (Note: Spanish pronunciation: [riˈkaɾðo alˈβeɾto maɾtiˈneli βeroˈkal]) (born 11 March 1951) is a Panamanian politician and businessman who served as the 36th President of Panama from 2009 to 2014.

In 2024, Martinelli was sentenced to ten years in prison for embezzlement of public funds and money laundering related to his use of public money to buy several Panamanian media outlets in 2010. He was implicated in several other corruption cases during his presidency (Odebrecht, New Business, Financial Pacific, Blue Apple, among others); as of February 2024, he is facing several trials.

== Early life ==
Born in Panama City, Ricardo Martinelli is the son of Ricardo Martinelli Pardini and Gloria Berrocal Fábrega.

His father is of Italian and Spanish descent, and his mother is of Spanish descent.

Ricardo Alberto Martinelli Berrocal is a direct descendant of a historic lineage connected to prominent figures in Panamanian history. On his mother’s side, Gloria Berrocal Fábrega, he is a sixth-generation descendant of José de Fábrega —a 19th-century political leader— making Martinelli the seventh generation linked to this notable family line. He is also the great-great-grandson of Justo Arosemena, one of the most influential thinkers in Panamanian history, widely regarded as the ideological father of the nation for his work promoting autonomy, legal reform, and national identity in the 19th century.

He completed his secondary education at Staunton Military Academy in Staunton, Virginia, in the United States. In 1973 he graduated with a Bachelor of Science in business administration degree from the University of Arkansas where he was a member of Sigma Nu fraternity.

== Business career ==
Martinelli began his career as a credit officer at Citibank in Panama. After several years of banking, he purchased the business of a client, in turn becoming an entrepreneur, buying or starting additional businesses. His net worth was estimated at $1.1 billion or more, according to press reports. The Economist stated that voters "want him to run the country as well as he manages his businesses" in response to his victory in the 2009 presidential election.

In 2009, he was the president and director of the board of Panamanian supermarket chain Super 99 and of two other companies. In May 2009, he passed the presidency of Super 99 to Luis Enrique Martinelli.

== Politics ==
During the presidency of Ernesto Pérez Balladares, Martinelli served as Director of Social security from 1994 to 1996. From September 1999 to January 2003, during the presidency of Mireya Moscoso, he served as chairman of the board of directors of the Panama Canal and as the Minister for Canal Affairs.

Martinelli was the president of the Democratic Change party, which he formed in 1998. He led the party and was the presidential candidate during the 2004 general election, when his party came in last; Martinelli received 5.3% of the vote and came in fourth place in the election.

Martinelli was the leader of Democratic Change and presidential candidate in the 2009 general election. He ran on a pro-business platform, promising to cut political corruption and reduce violent crime and spent an estimated $35 million on promoting his campaign. By Election Day, Martinelli was the favorite to win the election, with opinion polls giving him a double-digit lead over the ruling Democratic Revolutionary Party (PRD)–People's Party coalition. He had the support of the Alliance for Change, a group of political parties that includes his own Democratic Change party, the Panameñista Party, the Nationalist Republican Liberal Movement, and the Patriotic Union Party.

His main opponent was PRD candidate Balbina Herrera. Though initially the favorite, she was damaged in the election by her links to former military ruler Manuel Noriega and by the perception that she was a "Chavista", a supporter of leftist Venezuelan president Hugo Chavez. Martinelli was also helped by strong support from the business community.

On May 3, 2009, Martinelli won the national election by a landslide, with over 60% of the votes, thanks to the alliance with who would be his vice president, Juan Carlos Varela, who contributed the votes of the Panamanian party, 22.2% of the total, compared to Herrera, who received about 36%. Former president Guillermo Endara finished a distant third. This was the second-largest majority in Panamanian history and the largest since 1989. Martinelli's victory was an exception to a trend of victories for left-leaning Latin American candidates. He was sworn in on July 1, 2009.

== Presidency (2009–2014) ==
Martinelli served as president from 2009 through 2014.

Under Martinelli, Panama enjoyed high economic growth. As reported by The Economist in 2012, "though it lies in Central America, the poorest and most violent region in the West, the country's 3.6m citizens are now richer than most Latin Americans." The following year, The New York Times stated that "Panama [was] booming, with an average economic growth of 9 percent in [the past] five years, the highest in Latin America."

This prosperity widely benefited Panama, with unemployment declining from 6.6% to 4.1%. Income disparity also declined: according to The Economist, "the incomes of the poorest 10% are now 35 times lower than those of the richest 10%, rather than 60 times lower, according to the finance ministry." Gross domestic product (GDP) grew by nearly half, while GDP per capita rose 11%, from $9,982 in 2010 to $11,036 in 2014.

Martinelli introduced a number of measures designed to alleviate poverty, including a $100 monthly pension for the elderly, an increase in the minimum wage, and subsidies for students to meet the cost of uniforms and supplies. He also increased the minimum wage, making it the highest in Latin America.

He also implemented measures to help Colón, an impoverished city on the Gulf Coast. This included projects like a new highway connecting Panama and Colón, the Canal expansion, construction of a new hospital and other public works intended to help reduce unemployment and poverty. The government also announced a $9 million project to rehabilitate Colón's seaside park.

In 2012, Panama—along with the U.S.—was one of the few countries that voted against Palestine in a key U.N. vote.

=== Infrastructure investment ===
As of 2010, Martinelli's administration announced plans, ultimately fulfilled during his term, to invest $20 billion over the next four years on infrastructure designed to enhance Panama's role as a global logistics hub and increase foreign direct investment. The plan included greater investment in roads, hospitals, sewers, schools, and a Panama City metro. Fitch Group called the "ambitious public investment program" part of "Panama's highly favorable investment cycle." This plan ended up considerably increasing the public debt of the Panamanian state, which reached 45% of GDP.

The cornerstone of Martinelli's expansion program was the $5.3 billion expansion of the Panama Canal, which was started by his predecessor.

=== Pro-business policies and tax reform ===
Once during his first year in office, Martinelli proposed and signed into law tax reforms to simplify filings, reduce rates, and improve collection. The number of income brackets was reduced from five to two, the corporate tax rate was cut to 25%, and delinquent collection was outsourced. The tax reform imposed and collected taxes on a large swath of Panama's elite, which had largely avoided significant taxation. The program was not without controversy, however. A spokesperson for Fitch Group defended the tax reform "underpin[ned] the government's commitment to sustainable fiscal policies."

Martinelli oversaw the final approval of the Panama–United States Trade Promotion Agreement, which was signed more than two years before he took office but had not been finalized. Martinelli had designated the completion of this agreement as his top priority upon taking office. The agreement was ratified by the US Congress on October 13, 2011.

He also oversaw, the approval of a comprehensive Association treaty with other regional countries and the European Union.

Through pro-business policies, Martinelli saw through the growth of Panama as an international transport and financial hub. According to The Economist, "Its canal is becoming the backbone of a transoceanic logistics network. Its airline, Copa, connects much of Latin America. Its offshore-banking sector sucks in Latin American money."

=== Rule of Law ===
Martinelli also undertook efforts to strengthen the rule of law in Panama and to create greater transparency in its institutions, this had some success. According to the New York Times in 2011, " American law enforcement officials, while giving the country credit for improving its police forces and cooperation with international agencies, still consider it a major money-laundering haven." Furthermore, they report that "In the past two years [Panama] has signed agreements with 12 countries, including the United States, to exchange tax and other information upon request, a tool to investigate financial criminals."

In addition, Martinelli upheld and reinforced drug trafficking laws throughout his presidency. In 2012 alone, the Panamanian government seized over 11 tons of cocaine, as reported by IHS.

=== Panama becomes "investment grade" ===
During Martinelli's term, Panama's sovereign debt rating was upgraded to "investment grade" by Fitch, Moody's, and Standard & Poor's. Fitch had upgraded Panama twice since Martinelli took office, and Standard & Poor's followed its upgrade with a revised "positive" outlook. The Fitch upgrade was described as "a victory for conservative President Ricardo Martinelli, who has pushed two tax reforms through Congress since taking office".

Martinelli's policies contributed to credit upgrades but also robust increases in foreign direct investment (FDI). During his tenure, FDI rose from $1,259.3 billion (in 2009) to $4,651.3 billion (in 2013).

According to the New York Times, direct investment in real estate was exemplified by "the tallest building in Latin America, a 70-story Trump hotel and condo tower," further growth in financial services ("banking is booming") with "well-heeled foreign transplants" spending on local services and goods.

=== Reputation ===
Martinelli experienced high popularity ratings during his term of office, at one time in excess of 90%, the highest in the Americas at the time. In 2014, when he was preparing to leave office, his approval rating was still high, at 65%.

The Democratic Change Party, has continued to see strong legislative support: with Martinelli as its leader it continues to hold the biggest bloc of 30 seats, versus 12 seats for Panameñista Party in the 71-seat National Assembly. Martinelli remains the leader of Panama's opposition party.

Martinelli has also been criticized in the local and international media. In 2011, The Economist described the foreign investment as still hurt by "doubts about the rule of law", citing suspected corruption in the bidding for the metro contract and the flooding of a wealthy Panama City neighborhood with sewage due to a lack of enforcement of planning laws. Martinelli was also criticized during his presidency for authoritarian tactics. He sought to reduce the time period before the president could run for re-election though he withdrew when it proved unfeasible. He was accused of tampering with the Supreme Court. In August 2009, the US Ambassador to Panama, Barbara J. Stephenson, wrote to the US State Department that Martinelli had asked her for wiretaps on his political opponents, and she complained of his "bullying style" and "autocratic tendencies". A copy of the cable was leaked in December 2010. After the leak, Martinelli's administration said that "help in tapping the telephones of politicians was never requested" and that Stephenson was "mistaken" in her interpretation.

In December 2011, former military ruler Manuel Noriega was extradited from France to Panama by Martinelli's government. Critics charged that Martinelli had requested the extradition to turn public attention away from administration scandals, an accusation denied by Panamanian government.

== Legal issues ==
=== Corruption charges ===
After leaving power in July 2014, the government of his successor, Juan Carlos Varela, launched a series of investigations related to cost overruns during the Martinelli government. In the investigations of the National Aid Program (PAN), cost overruns of more than 45 million dollars in dehydrated food were detected. In the investigations, two former directors have been arrested: Giacomo Tamburelli and Rafael Guardia. In the statements, both pointed out that Martinelli had ordered both purchases with cost overruns. After an investigation, the case was closed without evidence against the former president, since the Judicial Branch recognized that it could not gather elements of conviction to prove the prosecution.

Given the allegations, on January 28, 2015, an investigation was launched against Martinelli, with the unanimous vote of all the magistrates of the Supreme Court of Justice, for "alleged crimes against the public administration." However, Martinelli had left Panama hours earlier for Guatemala City, headquarters of the Central American Parliament (Parlacen), of which he serves as a deputy and, as such, argues that he has jurisdiction against criminal proceedings, which in 2012 he had described as "cave of thieves "; Relying on the fact that as a former president he is a Parlacen deputy, he denounced the current government in harsh terms and accusing President Varela of wanting to assassinate him, however the plenary session of Parlacen affirmed that he had no immunity, since if the National Assembly of Panama did not grants parliamentary immunity to local deputies, the Parlacen cannot either. After reporting what he described as a persecution against him to Parlacen, Martinelli took refuge in Miami.

Additionally, Martinelli has proceedings open for espionage and telephone interception of more than 150 people during his mandate, most of them opponents (including businessmen, independent journalists and magistrates). Because he was still in the United States and did not attend the preliminary hearing on December 11, 2015, he was declared in "default" by the guarantee judge Jerónimo Mejía and went to the plenary session of the Supreme Court of Justice of Panama. on whether Martinelli would be called to a hearing, ordering his "provisional arrest" on December 21.

=== 2017 U.S. arrest ===
On June 12, 2017, Martinelli was arrested at Coral Gables in south Florida after a provisional arrest warrant issued by the U.S. Justice Department in response to a request from Panama and was set to appear on Federal Court.

Martinelli and Manuel Antonio Noriega, are the only Panamanian political leaders detained in the US for judicial processes of institutional gravity. In May 2017, Interpol issued a red notice (request for international arrest) for the extradition of Ricardo Martinelli, installed in Miami. Panamanian justice accused the former president of having spied on telephone conversations of about 150 people, including journalists and leaders of the opposition. Martinelli was arrested in Miami by U.S. Marshals on June 12, 2017, to face extradition to Panama. He was extradited to Panama on June 11, 2018, to face the wiretapping charges. On August 9, 2019, a 3-judge panel declared Ricardo Martinelli not guilty, the court cleared the former president of espionage and corruption during his administration and ordered him released from house arrest.

=== In Spain ===
A Spanish court could not find Martinelli in 2022. He is suspected to have hired a private security outfit ("Group Kougar") in Mallorca, Spain, to spy on his lover while she was there in 2020. Group Kougar included members of the Spanish Civil Guard and Army. In 2021, the Spanish National Court accused Martinelli of corruption and money laundering in the construction of two lines of the Panama Metro and Ciudad de la Salud built by Odebrecht (see the Odebrecht Case), Fomento de Construcciones y Contratas and associates.

=== "New Business" money laundering case and asylum ===
On July 18, 2023, a criminal court in Panama sentenced Martinelli to more than 10 years in prison for money laundering, relating to the "New Business" case that dates back to 2017. The case concerns the 2010 purchase of a Panamanian national media company, with prosecutors claiming that Martinelli gave lucrative government contracts to businesses that later transferred money to the company "New Business", a front Martinelli used to purchase the company. His conviction was upheld by the Panamanian Supreme Court on February 2, 2024, making him ineligible to run again for president in elections that he wanted to contest later in the year. His candidacy was formally revoked by the Panamanian electoral tribunal on March 4.

Following the Supreme Court's decision, Martinelli held a rally in Panama City in which he insisted that he would continue his presidential campaign. However, he later claimed that incumbent president Laurentino Cortizo was seeking to imprison and even kill him, which led him to seek refuge at the Nicaraguan embassy, with his lawyer saying that "his life was in danger.” On February 7, the Nicaraguan foreign ministry announced that it had granted Martinelli asylum on the basis of political persecution and imminent risk to his life, and called on the Panamanian government to allow his departure to Nicaragua. On 9 February, the Panamanian foreign ministry denied the request, stating that the 1928 Convention on Asylum does not allow its signatories to grant asylum in their diplomatic missions to people condemned for common crimes. On 22 February, Panamanian authorities approved the cancellation of his conditional release and ordered his arrest.

On 27 March 2025, the Panamanian government, citing health issues, granted Martinelli safe passage to leave the country for Nicaragua. However, Martinelli called the decision a "trap" and refused to leave the embassy by the time the deadline given to him by the depart expired on 3 April. On 10 May, the Panamanian government announced that Martinelli had left the country for Colombia following a grant of asylum from President Gustavo Petro.

== Honors and awards ==
On February 20, 2010, the University of Arkansas established the Ricardo A. Martinelli Berrocal Scholarship to provide financial aid to prospective University of Arkansas students from Panama. He was also presented with the Citation of Distinguished Alumnus award and was made an official ambassador of the State of Arkansas by Governor Mike Beebe.

On June 16, 2013, received and acknowledgement from the FAO in Rome, Italy, for helping to reduce the child malnutrition in the Panamanian territory. It took place during the 38th Session of the Food and Agriculture Organization of the United Nations (FAO) Conference. Martinelli was awarded besides other thirty seven countries.

- France:
  - Grand Cross of the National Order of the Legion of Honour (July 14, 2013)
- Haiti:
  - Grand Cross of the National Order of Honour and Merit (February 18, 2014)
- Honduras:
  - Grand Cross Gold Plate of the Order of José Cecilio del Valle (September 10, 2013)
- Peru:
  - Grand Collar of the Order of the Sun of Peru (August 26, 2010)
- Portugal:
  - Grand Collar of the Order of Prince Henry, Portugal (July 29, 2013)
- (Kingdom of the Two Sicilies) Royal House of Bourbon-Two Sicilies:
  - Knight Grand Cross, Special Class of the Sacred Military Constantinian Order of Saint George (July 28, 2012)
- Taiwan:
  - Grand Cordon of the Order of Brilliant Jade (November 1, 2010)

== Personal life ==
In 1978, Martinelli married Marta Linares, with whom he has three children: Ricardo Alberto Martinelli Linares, Luis Enrique Martinelli Linares, and Carolina Martinelli Linares. Ricardo and Luis Enrique are accused of having received at least 22 million dollars from the Brazilian company Odebrecht as part of a vast corruption scandal. The money had then been hidden on bank accounts in Switzerland.

== Notes ==
Political offices
Preceded by Martín Torrijos	President of Panama; 2009–2014	Succeeded by Juan Carlos Varela
