= History of Panama (1977–present) =

Panama is a transcontinental country spanning the southern part of North America and the northern part of South America.

== 1977 treaties and associated agreements ==
On September 7, 1977, Carter and Torrijos met in Washington to sign the treaties in a ceremony that also was attended by representatives of twenty-six other nations of the Western Hemisphere. The Panama Canal Treaty, the major document, abrogated the 1903 treaty and all other previous bilateral agreements concerning the canal. The treaty was to enter into force six months after the exchange of instruments of ratification and to expire at noon on December 31, 1999. The Panama Canal Company and the Canal Zone government would cease to operate and Panama would assume complete legal jurisdiction over the former Canal Zone immediately, although the United States would retain jurisdiction over its citizens during a thirty-month transition period. Panama would grant the United States rights to operate, maintain, and manage the canal through a new United States government agency, the Panama Canal Commission. The commission would be supervised by a board of five members from the United States and four from Panama; the ratio was fixed for the duration of the treaty. The commission would have a United States administrator and Panamanian deputy administrator until January 1, 1990, when the nationalities of these two positions would be reversed. Panamanian nationals would constitute a growing number of commission employees in preparation for their assumption of full responsibility in 2000. Another binational body, the Panama Canal Consultative Committee, was created to advise the respective governments on policy matters affecting the canal's operation.

Statement on the Panama Canal Treaty Signing
Jimmy Carter's speech upon signing the Panama Canal treaty, 7 September 1977.

Statement on the Panama Canal Treaty Signing
audio only version

Article IV of the treaty related to the protection and defense of the canal and mandated both nations to participate in that effort, though the United States was to hold the primary responsibility during the life of the treaty. The Combined Board, composed of an equal number of senior military representatives from each country, was established and its members charged with consulting their respective governments on matters relating to protection and defense of the canal. Guidelines for employment within the Panama Canal Commission were set forth in Article X, which stipulated that the United States would establish a training program to ensure that an increasing number of Panamanian nationals acquired the skills needed to operate and maintain the canal. By 1982 the number of United States employees of the commission was to be at least 20 percent lower than the number working for the Panama Canal Company in 1977. Both nations pledged to assist their own nationals who lost jobs because of the new arrangements in finding employment. The right to collective bargaining and affiliation with international labor organizations by commission employees was guaranteed.

Under the provisions of Article XII, the United States and Panama agreed to study jointly the feasibility of a sea-level canal and, if deemed necessary, to negotiate terms for its construction. Payments to Panama from the commission ("a just and equitable return on the national resources which it has dedicated to the . . . canal") were set forth in Article XIII. These included a fixed annuity of US$10 million, an annual contingency payment of up to US$10 million to be paid out of any commission profits, and US$0.30 per Panama Canal net ton of cargo that passed through the canal, paid out of canal tolls. The latter figure was to be periodically adjusted for inflation and was expected to net Panama between US$40 and US$70 million annually during the life of the treaty. In addition, Article III stipulated that Panama would receive a further US$10 million annually for services (police, fire protection, street cleaning, traffic management, and garbage collection) it would provide in the canal operating areas.

The second treaty, the Treaty Concerning the Permanent Neutrality and Operation of the Panama Canal, or simply the Neutrality Treaty, was a much shorter document. Because it had no fixed termination date, this treaty was the major source of controversy. Under its provisions, the United States and Panama agreed to guarantee the canal's neutrality "in order that both in time of peace and in time of war it shall remain secure and open to peaceful transit by the vessels of all nations on terms of entire equality". In times of war, however, United States and Panamanian warships were entitled to "expeditious" transit of the canal under the provisions of Article VI. A Protocol was attached to the Neutrality Treaty, and all nations of the world were invited to subscribe to its provisions.

At the same ceremony in Washington, representatives of the United States and Panama signed a series of fourteen executive agreements associated with the treaties. These included two Agreements in Implementation of Articles III and IV of the Panama Canal Treaty that detailed provisions concerning operation, management, protection, and defense, outlined in the main treaty. Most importantly, these two agreements defined the areas to be held by the United States until 2000 to operate and defend the canal. These areas were distinguished from military areas to be used jointly by the United States and Panama until that time, military areas to be held initially by the United States but turned over to Panama before 2000, and areas that were turned over to Panama on October 1, 1979.

One foreign observer calculated that 64 percent of the former Canal Zone, or 106,700 hectares, came under Panamanian control in 1979; another 18 percent, or 29,460 hectares, would constitute the "canal operating area" and remain under control of the Panama Canal Commission until 2000; and the remaining 18 percent would constitute the various military installations controlled by the United States until 2000. The agreements also established the Coordinating Committee, consisting of one representative of each country, to coordinate the implementation of the agreement with respect to Article III of the Panama Canal Treaty, and an analogous Joint Committee to perform the defense-related functions called for in the agreement with respect to Article IV of the treaty.

Ancillary agreements signed on September 7 allowed the United States to conduct certain activities in Panama until 2000, including the training of Latin American military personnel at four schools located within the former Canal Zone; provided for cooperation to protect wildlife within the area; and outlined future United States economic and military assistance. This latter agreement, subject to the availability of congressionally approved funds, provided for United States loan guarantees, up to US$75 million over a 5-year period, for housing; a US$20-million loan guarantee by the United States Overseas Private Investment Corporation for financing projects in the Panamanian private sector; loans, loan guarantees, and insurance, up to a limit of US$200 million between 1977 and 1982, provided by the United States Export-Import Bank for financing Panamanian purchases of United States exports; and up to US$50 million in foreign military sales credits over a 10-year period.

The speeches of Carter and Torrijos at the signing ceremony revealed the differing attitudes toward the new accords by the two leaders. Carter declared his unqualified support of the new treaties. The statement by Torrijos was more ambiguous, however. While he stated that the signing of the new treaties "attests to the end of many struggles by several generations of Panamanian patriots", he noted Panamanian criticism of several aspects of the new accords, particularly of the Neutrality Treaty: "Mr. President, I want you to know that this treaty, which I shall sign and which repeals a treaty not signed by any Panamanian, does not enjoy the approval of all our people, because the twenty-three years agreed upon as a transition period are 8,395 days, because during this time there will still be military bases which make my country a strategic reprisal target, and because we are agreeing to a treaty of neutrality which places us under the protective umbrella of the Pentagon. This pact could, if it is not administered judiciously by future generations, become an instrument of permanent intervention."

Torrijos was so concerned with the ambiguity of the Neutrality Treaty, because of Panamanian sensitivity to the question of United States military intervention, that, at his urging, he and President Carter signed the Statement of Understanding on October 14, 1977, to clarify the meaning of the permanent United States rights. This statement, most of which was subsequently included as an amendment to the Neutrality Treaty and incorporated into its instrument of ratification, included a declaration that the United States "right to act against any aggression or threat directed against the Canal . . . does not mean, nor shall it be interpreted as the right of intervention of the United States in the internal affairs of Panama." Despite this clarification, the plebiscite that took place the next week and served as the legal means of ratification in Panama, saw only two-thirds of Panamanians registering their approval of the new treaties, a number considerably smaller than that hoped for by the government.

Ratification in the United States necessitated the approval of two-thirds of the Senate. The debates, the longest in Senate history, began on February 7, 1978. The Neutrality Treaty was approved on March 16, and the main treaty on April 18, when the debate finally ended. To win the necessary sixty-seven Senate votes, Carter agreed to the inclusion of a number of amendments, conditions, reservations, and understandings that were passed during the Senate debates and subsequently included in the instruments of ratification signed by Carter and Torrijos in June.

Notable among the Senate modifications of the Neutrality Treaty were two amendments incorporating the October 1977 Statement of Understanding, and interpreting the "expeditious" transit of United States and Panamanian warships in times of war as being preferential. Another modification, commonly known as the DeConcini Condition, stated that "if the Canal is closed, or its operations are interfered with [the United States and Panama shall each] have the right to take such steps as each deems necessary, ... including the use of military force in the Republic of Panama, to reopen the Canal or restore the operations of the Canal". Modifications of the Panama Canal Treaty included a reservation requiring statutory authorization for payments to Panama set forth in Article XIII and another stating that any action taken by the United States to secure accessibility to the Canal "shall not have as its purpose or be interpreted as a right of intervention in the internal affairs of the Republic of Panama or interference with its political independence or sovereign integrity". Reservations attached to both treaties made the United States provision of economic and military assistance, as detailed in the ancillary agreements attached to the treaties, nonobligatory.

The inclusion of these modifications, which were never ratified in Panama, was received there by a storm of protest. Torrijos expressed his concern in 2 letters, the first to Carter and another sent to 115 heads of state through their representatives at the UN. A series of student protests took place in front of the United States embassy. The DeConcini Condition was the major object of protest. Although the reservation to the Panama Canal Treaty was designed to mollify Panamanian fears that the DeConcini Condition marked a return to the United States gunboat diplomacy of the early twentieth century, this provision would expire in 2000, whereas the DeConcini Condition, because it was attached to the Neutrality Treaty, would remain in force permanently.

Despite his continuing concern with the ambiguity of the treaties with respect to the United States role in defense of the canal after 2000, the close Senate vote made Torrijos aware that he could not secure any further modification at that time. On June 16, 1978, he and Carter signed the instruments of ratification of each treaty in a ceremony in Panama City. Nevertheless, Torrijos added the following statement to both Panamanian instruments: "The Republic of Panama will reject, in unity and with decisiveness and firmness, any attempt by any country to intervene in its internal or external affairs." The instruments of ratification became effective on June 1, 1979, and the treaties entered into force on October 1, 1979.

== Torrijos government undertakes "democratization" ==
Ironically, the successful conclusion of negotiations with the United States and the signing of the Panama Canal treaties in August 1977 added to the growing political difficulties in Panama. Virtually all observers of Panamanian politics in the late 1970s agreed that the situation in the late 1970s could only be understood in terms of the central role traditionally played by nationalism in forming Panamanian political consensus. Before August 1977, opponents of Torrijos were reluctant to challenge his leadership because of his progress in gaining control over the Canal Zone. The signing of the treaties eliminated that restraint; in short, after August 1977, Panamanian resentment could no longer be focused exclusively on the United States.

The widespread feeling among Panamanians that the 1977 treaties were unacceptable, despite their being approved by a two-thirds majority in the October 1977 plebiscite, contributed to growing opposition to the government. Critics pointed especially to the amendments imposed by the United States Senate after the October 1977 plebiscite, which they felt substantially altered the spirit of the treaties. Furthermore, political opponents of Torrijos argued that the government purposely limited the information available on the treaties and then asked the people to vote "yes" or "no," in a plebiscite that the opposition maintained was conducted fraudulently.

Another factor contributing to the erosion of the populist alliance built by Torrijos during the early 1970s was the graduated and controlled process of "democratization" undertaken by the Torrijos government after signing the new canal treaties. In October 1978, a decade after the government declared political parties illegal in the aftermath of the 1968 military coup d'état, the 1972 Constitution was reformed to implement a new electoral law and legalize political parties. In the spirit of opening the political system that accompanied the ratification of the Panama Canal treaties, exiled political leaders, including former president Arnulfo Arias, were allowed to return to the country, and a flurry of political activity was evident during the subsequent eighteen months. Foremost among the activities were efforts to obtain the 30,000 signatures legally required to register a party for the October 1980 elections.

The 1978 amendments to the 1972 Constitution markedly decreased the powers of the executive branch of government and increased those of the legislature, but the executive remained the dominant branch. From October 1972 until October 1978, Torrijos had acted as the chief executive under the titles of head of government and "Maximum Leader of the Panamanian Revolution." After the 1978 amendments took effect, Torrijos gave up his position as head of government but retained control of the National Guard and continued to play an important role in the government's decision-making process. Before stepping down, Torrijos had agreed to democratize Panama's political system, in order to gain United States support for the canal treaties. In October 1978, the National Assembly elected a thirty-eight-year-old lawyer and former education minister, Arístides Royo, to the presidency and Ricardo de la Espriella to the vice presidency, each for a six-year term.

The PRD—a potpourri of middle-class elements, peasant and labor groups, and marginal segments of Panamanian society—was the first party to be officially recognized under the registration process that began in 1979. Wide speculation held that the PRD would nominate Torrijos as its candidate for the presidential race planned for 1984. Moreover, many assumed that with government backing, the PRD would have a substantial advantage in the electoral process.

In March 1979, a coalition of eight parties called the National Opposition Front (Frente Nacional de Oposición, FRENO) was formed to battle the PRD in the 1980 legislative elections, the first free elections to be held in a decade. FRENO was composed of parties on both the right and the left of center in the political spectrum, including the strongly nationalistic, anti-Yankee Authentic Panameñista Party (Partido Panameñista Auténtico, PPA), which was led by the aged but still popular former president, Arnulfo Arias; the PLN; the reform-oriented PDC; and the Social Democratic Party (Partido Social Democrático, PSD), which was left of center and reform-oriented. Three right-of-center parties—the Republican Party (Partido Republicano, PR), the Third Nationalist Party, and PALA—had also joined the FRENO coalition. The Independent Democratic Movement, a small, moderately left-of-center party, completed the coalition. Such diverse ideologies in the opposition party suggested a marriage of convenience. FRENO opposed the Panama Canal treaties and called for their revision on terms more favorable to Panama.

All qualified parties competed in the 1980 legislative elections, but these elections posed no threat to Torrijos's power base because political parties vied for only nineteen of the fifty-seven seats in the legislature. The other two-thirds of the representatives were appointed, in essence by Torrijos's supporters. The PRD won twelve of the available nineteen seats; the PLN won five seats, and the PDC, one. The remaining seat was won by an independent candidate running with the support of a communist party, the People's Party of Panama (Partido del Pueblo de Panamá, PPP). The PPP had failed to acquire the signatures required for a place on the ballot. Despite the lopsided victory of the progovernment party and the weakness of the National Legislative Council (budgeting and appropriations were controlled by President Royo, who had been handpicked by Torrijos), this election represented a small step toward restoring democratic political processes. The election also demonstrated that Panama's political party system was too fragmented to form a viable united front against the government.

== General Manuel Noriega and the U.S. invasion ==
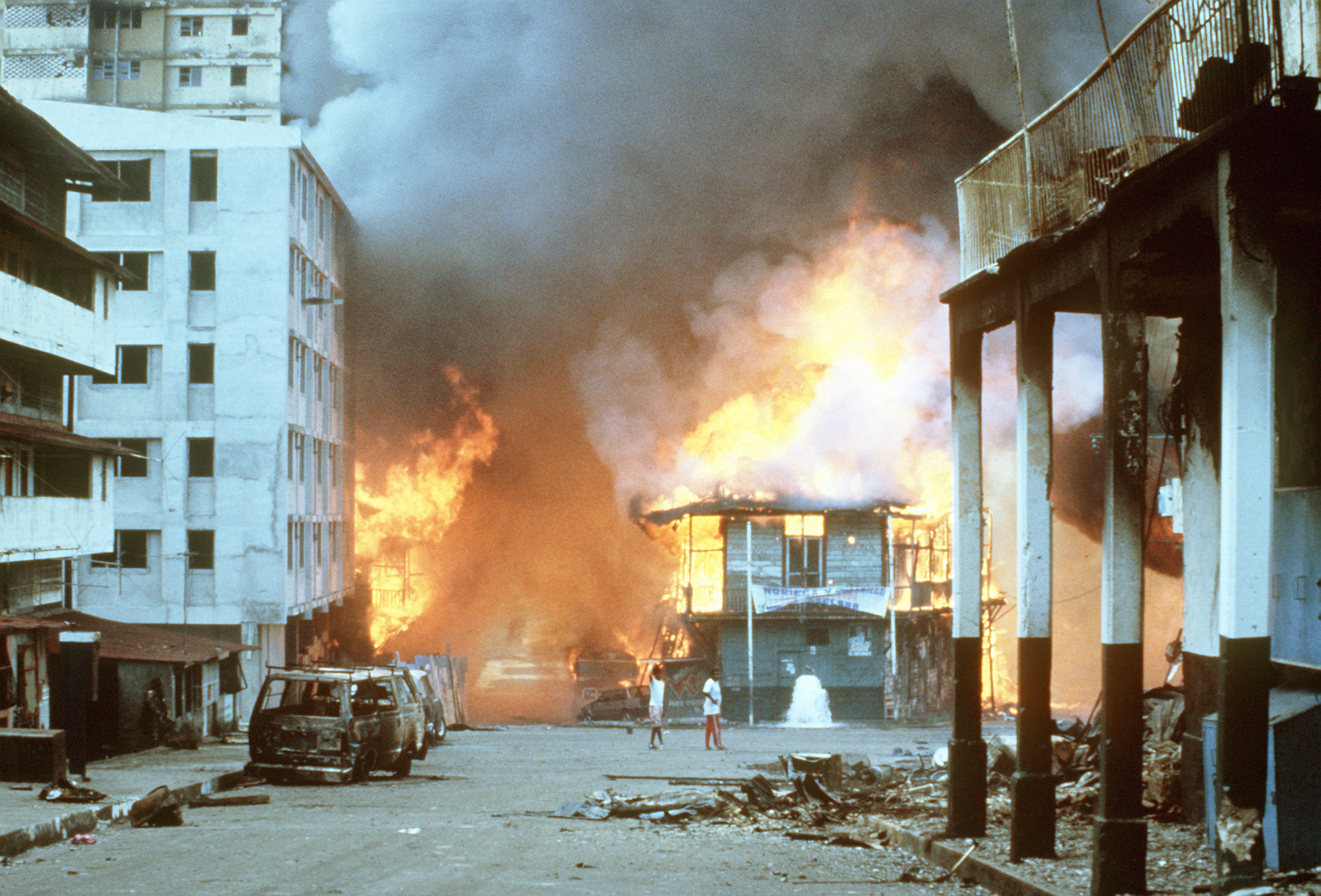
Aftermath of urban warfare during the United States invasion of Panama

Torrijos died in a mysterious plane crash on August 1, 1981. The circumstances of his death generated charges and speculation that he was the victim of an assassination plot. Torrijos' death altered the tone but not the direction of Panama's political evolution. Despite 1983 constitutional amendments, which appeared to proscribe a political role for the military, the Panama Defense Forces (PDF), as they were then known, continued to dominate Panamanian political life behind a facade of civilian government. By this time, Gen. Manuel Noriega was firmly in control of both the PDF and the civilian government, and had created the Dignity Battalions to help suppress opposition.

Despite collaboration between Panama and the U.S. during the Reagan administration in support of the Contras, who opposed the Sandinista government in Nicaragua as part of the Reagan Doctrine, relations between the U.S. and Panama largely worsened in the 1980s.

The United States froze economic and military assistance to Panama in the middle of 1987 in response to the domestic political crisis and an attack on the U.S. embassy. General Noriega's February 1988 indictment in U.S. courts on drug-trafficking charges sharpened tensions. In April 1988, President Reagan invoked the International Emergency Economic Powers Act, freezing Panamanian Government assets in U.S. banks, withholding fees for using the canal, and prohibiting payments by American agencies, firms, and individuals to the Noriega regime. The country went into turmoil. When national elections were held in May 1989, the elections were marred by accusations of fraud from both sides. An American, Kurt Muse, was apprehended by the Panamanian authorities, after he had set up a sophisticated radio and computer installation, designed to jam Panamanian radio and broadcast phony election returns. However, the elections proceeded as planned, and Panamanians voted for the anti-Noriega candidates by a margin of over three-to-one. The Noriega regime promptly annulled the election and embarked on a new round of repression. By the second half of 1989, the regime was barely clinging to power. Failed coups occurred in March 1988 and October 1989.

When Guillermo Endara won the Presidential elections held in May 1989, the Noriega regime annulled the election, citing massive US interference. Foreign election observers, including the Catholic Church and Jimmy Carter certified the electoral victory of Endara despite widespread attempts at fraud by the regime. At the behest of the United States, the Organization of American States convened a meeting of foreign ministers but was unable to obtain Noriega's departure. The U.S. began sending thousands of troops to bases in the canal zone. Panamanian authorities alleged that U.S. troops left their bases and illegally stopped and searched vehicles in Panama. During this time, an American Marine got lost in the former French quarter of Panama City, ran a roadblock, and was killed by Panamanian Police (who were then a part of the Panamanian Military). On December 20, 1989 the United States troops commenced an invasion of Panama. Their primary objectives were achieved quickly, and the combatants withdrawal began on December 27. The US was obligated to hand control of the Panama Canal her to Panama on January 1 due to a treaty signed decades before. Endara was sworn in as President at a U.S. military base on the day of the invasion. General Manuel Noriega is now serving a 40-year sentence for drug trafficking. Estimates as to the loss of life on the Panamanian side vary between 500 and 7000. There are also claims that U.S. troops buried many corpses in mass graves or simply threw them into the sea. For different perspectives, see references below. Much of the Chorillo neighborhood was destroyed by fire shortly after the start of the invasion.

Following the invasion, President George H. W. Bush announced a billion dollars in aid to Panama. Critics argue that about half the aid was a gift from the American taxpayer to American businesses, as $400 million consisted of incentives for U.S. business to export products to Panama, $150 million was to pay off bank loans and $65 million went to private sector loans and guarantees to U.S. investors.

The entire Panama Canal, the area supporting the Canal, and remaining US military bases were turned over to Panama on December 31, 1999.

== Politics and institutions after Noriega ==
In the morning of December 20, 1989, a few hours after the beginning of the invasion, the presumptive winner of the May 1989 election, Guillermo Endara, was sworn in as president of Panama at a U.S. military installation in the Canal Zone. Subsequently, on December 27, 1989, Panama's Electoral Tribunal invalidated the Noriega regime's annulment of the May 1989 election and confirmed the victory of opposition candidates under the leadership of President Guillermo Endara and Vice Presidents Guillermo Ford and Ricardo Arias Calderón.

President Endara took office as the head of a four-party minority government, pledging to foster Panama's economic recovery, transform the Panamanian military into a police force under civilian control, and strengthen democratic institutions. During its 5-year term, the Endara government struggled to meet the public's high expectations. Its new police force proved to be a major improvement in outlook and behavior over its thuggish predecessor but was not fully able to deter crime. Ernesto Pérez Balladares was sworn in as President on September 1, 1994, after an internationally monitored election campaign.

Pérez Balladares ran as the candidate for a three-party coalition dominated by the Democratic Revolutionary Party (PRD), the erstwhile political arm of the military dictatorship during the Torrijos and Norieiga years. A long-time member of the PRD, Pérez Balladares worked skillfully during the campaign to rehabilitate the PRD's image, emphasizing the party's populist Torrijos roots rather than its association with Noriega. He won the election with only 33% of the vote when the major non-PRD forces, unable to agree on a joint candidate, splintered into competing factions. His administration carried out economic reforms and often worked closely with the U.S. on implementation of the Canal treaties.

On May 2, 1999, Mireya Moscoso, the widow of former president Arnulfo Arias Madrid, defeated PRD candidate Martín Torrijos, son of the late dictator. The elections were considered free and fair. Moscoso took office on September 1, 1999.

During her administration, Moscoso attempted to strengthen social programs, especially for child and youth development, protection, and general welfare. Education programs have also been highlighted. More recently, Moscoso focused on bilateral and multilateral free trade initiatives with the hemisphere. Moscoso's administration successfully handled the Panama Canal transfer and has been effective in the administration of the Canal.

Panama's counternarcotics cooperation has historically been excellent (in fact, officials of the DEA praised the role played by Manuel Noriega prior to his falling-out with the U.S.) The Panamanian Government has expanded money-laundering legislation and concluded with the U.S. a Counternarcotics Maritime Agreement and a Stolen Vehicles Agreement. In the economic investment arena, the Panamanian Government has been very successful in the enforcement of intellectual property rights and has concluded with the U.S. a very important Bilateral Investment Treaty Amendment and an agreement with the Overseas Private Investment Corporation (OPIC). The Moscoso administration was very supportive of the United States in combating international terrorism.

In 2004, Martín Torrijos again ran for president but this time won handily. In 2009, conservative supermarket magnate Ricardo Martinelli won a landslide victory in the presidential election and he succeeded president Martin Torrijos. Five years later, President Martinelli was succeeded by Juan Carlos Varela, the winner of 2014 election.

In 2016, the Panama Papers, which is not to be confused with the 2017 public release of the Paradise Papers, were released. The Panamanian law firm of Mossack Fonseca (MossFon) was cited numerous times in these documents and later dissolved on March 14, 2018.

In July 2019, Laurentino “Nito” Cortizo of the Democratic Revolution Party (PRD) was sworn in as the new President of Panama, after winning the May 2019 presidential election. On 1 July 2024, José Raúl Mulino was sworn in as Panama’s new president. Mulino, a close ally of former president Ricardo Martinelli, won the presidential election in May 2024.
