= Ana Mae Díaz =

Wife of Guillermo Endara

Ana Mae Diaz

First Lady of Panama
- In role June 11, 1990 – September 1, 1994
- Preceded by: Mariela de Delvalle
- Succeeded by: Dora Boyd de Perez Balladares

Personal details
- Born: May 16, 1967 (age 59)
- Spouse(s): Guillermo Endara (m. 1990–2009)

Ana Mae Diaz de Endara (born May 16, 1967) was the First Lady of Panama from 1990–1994.

== Relationship with Endara ==
A Panamanian of Chinese origin, Diaz met future president Guillermo Endara in September 1989, while he was on hunger strike to protest the autocratic military rule of Manuel Noriega. Diaz was a law student at the time. The former First Lady-designate, Marcela Endara, Guillermo's wife of 28 years, had died in June of a heart attack while Endara was hospitalized due to a beating by Noriega's forces. International observers had reported Endara to be the clear leader in the May presidential election, and — although he had earlier showed discomfort with US patronage — during the US invasion of Panama in December, he was sworn in as president from the safety of a US military base in the Canal Zone.

Panamanian newspapers began to publish photographs of Diaz and Endara together in January 1990, and Endara told press the pair were "going out".

== First Lady of Panama ==
The pair married on June 11, 1990, within 9 months of having first met, in a wedding attended by the ambassadors of various nations. Endara was reportedly so happy in the marriage that he would even be described as allegedly leaving cabinet meetings for a "quick cuddle".

Due in part to the couple's difference in ages and weights—Endara was in his mid-fifties, already a grandfather, and — despite his hunger strike — known for his weight; Ana Mae Díaz was 23—the marriage received widespread coverage and mockery in the Panamanian press, including a new nickname for Endara, El Gordo Feliz ("Happy Fatty").

In 1991, Diaz slapped a journalist for asking about her criticisms of El Salvadoran president Alfredo Christiani and Panamanian justice minister Arias Calderón. A year later, she won $125,000 in the national lottery and indicated that she intended to keep the money rather than donating it; the incident was cited as an example of the Endara's administration's lack of concern for the poor. In 1994, she was accused of reselling food that had been donated by Italy on the streets of Panama City, one of a number of financial scandals to strike the administration.

== Later life ==
Endara ran for president again in 2004 and in 2009, placing second and a distant third, respectively. On September 28, 2009, he died at age 73 at his home in Panama City, of a heart attack.

== See also ==
- First ladies and gentlemen of Panama
