= Mitchell Doens =

Panamanian politician and economist (1946–2026)

- Born: 26 September 1946; Colón, Panama
- Died: 24 August 2026 (aged 79); Panama City, Panama
- Education: University of Panama
- Occupations: Politician, economist, writer
- Political party: Democratic Revolutionary Party

Mitchell Constantino Doens Ambrosio (26 September 1946 – 24 August 2026) was a Panamanian politician, economist and writer. He served as the country's Minister of Labour and Social Welfare in the 1990s, and the secretary general of the National Executive Council of the Democratic Revolutionary Party (PRD) from 2009 to 2012. A member of the PRD since 1979, he worked as an economist for the government during the military dictatorship and later participated in the party's restructuring after the 1989 United States invasion of Panama and overthrow of dictator Manuel Noriega.

Doens also worked as a columnist, writing about Panamanian politics and international relationships.

== Early life and education ==
Mitchell Constantino Doens Ambrosio was born on 26 September 1946 in Colón, Colón Province, to a Cuban mother and a Panamanian father. He and his family moved to Panama City when he was an infant and he grew up in the neighborhood of Calidonia. Doens became interested in politics as a teenager after the 1964 Flag Incident, where the United States Canal Zone Police killed Panamanian student protestors. He studied at the Fermin Naudeau Institute in Panama City and, subsequently, graduated from the University of Panama, where he had studied economics. He was politically active as a student, being a member and leader in the youth branch of the People's Party of Panama, the Frente de Reforma Universitaria, and the Federación de Estudiantes de Panamá.

== Career ==
Early in his political career, Doens aligned himself with the politics of Omar Torrijos, joining his Democratic Revolutionary Party (PRD) in 1979. During the subsequent military dictatorship, Doens worked for the Ministry of Finance and Ministry of Education as a economist, where he worked on the Bayano Dam project. After the United States invasion of Panama in 1989 and the overthrow of the PRD government and dictator Manuel Noriega, Doens initially went into hiding with other members of the party. He later participated in the restructuring of the PRD and was elected the first subsecretary of its National Executive Council (Consejo Ejecutivo Nacional, CEN).

When Ernesto Pérez Balladares was elected to the presidency in 1994, Doens, who had campaigned for Pérez Balladares, was appointed the Minister of Labour and Social Welfare. In 1995, he briefly assumed the responsibilities of the then-Minister of Economy and Finance, Guillermo Chapman Fábrega, when Chapman and his vice minister were on trips abroad. Doens left his cabinet position in 1998.

Doens was elected secretary general of the CEN in 2009, at the beginning of the presidency of Ricardo Martinelli. It was subsequently revealed that, during this time, the Martinelli administration had wiretapped Doens and other members of the opposition in the Caso Pinchazos (transl. Pinchazos Case). Doens ran for re-election in 2012, but lost to Juan Carlos Navarro. In September 2025, he announced he would again run for the position of secretary general in the CEN, but withdrew the next month, citing health issues. He endorsed Balbina Herrera in his place.

In addition to his political career, Doens also worked as a lawyer and a columnist who wrote on Panamanian politics and international relationships.

== Personal life and death ==
In the final year of his life, Doens was diagnosed with cancer and underwent surgery in Spain. He died on 24 August 2026, at the age of 79, after experiencing a cardiac arrest at Hospital Santo Tomás, where he had been hospitalised for pneumonia.
