= First ladies and gentlemen of Panama =

Spouse or partner of the president

First Lady of Panama

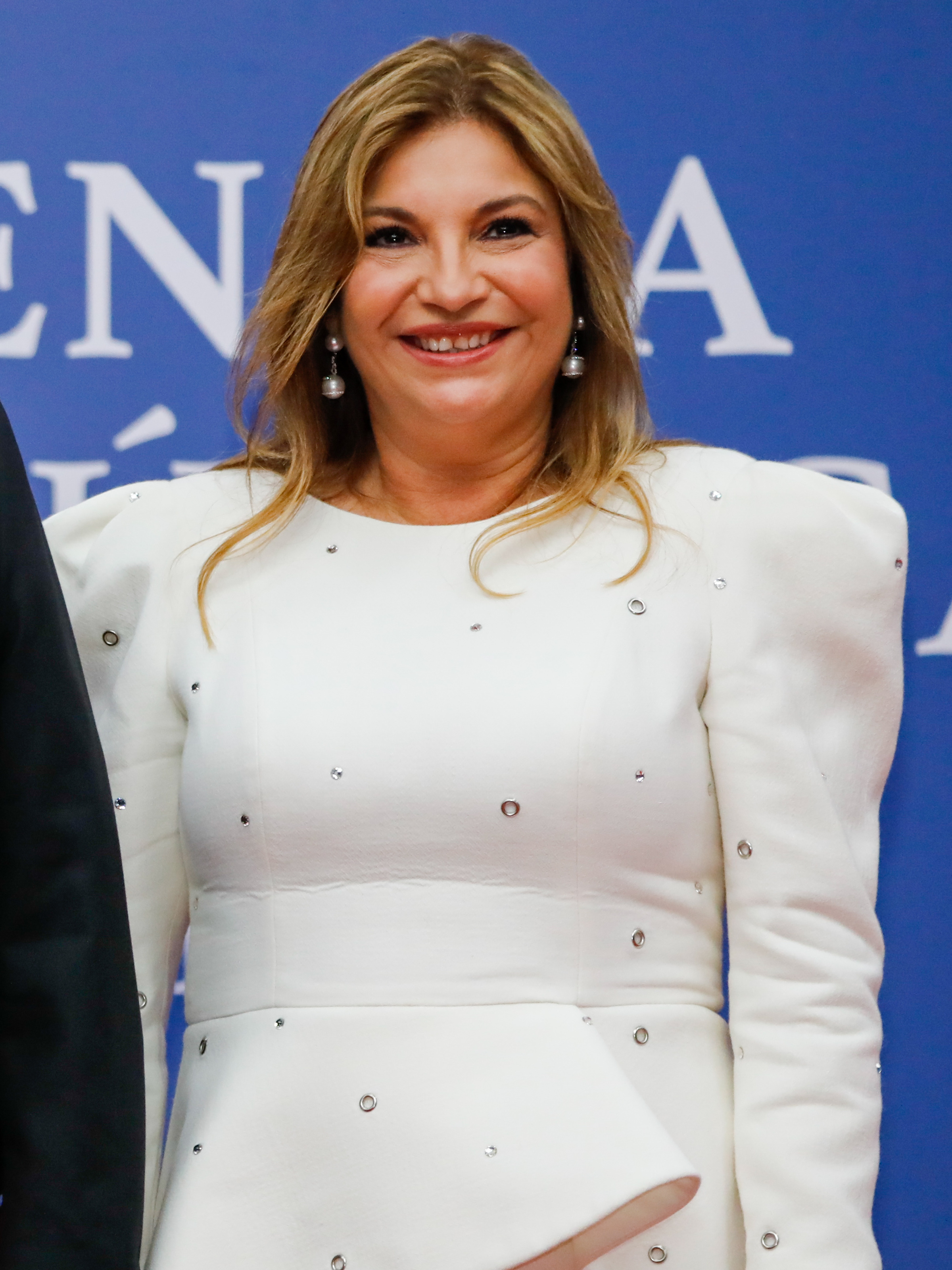
- Incumbent; Maricel Cohen de Mulino since July 1, 2024
- Residence: Palacio de las Garzas, Panama City
- Inaugural holder: María de la Ossa de Amador
- Formation: February 20, 1904
- Website: First Lady of the Republic of Panama

First Lady and First Gentleman of Panama (Spanish: Primera Dama o Caballero de Panama) are unofficial titles traditionally held by the wife or husband of the president of Panama.

== List ==
The following is an incomplete list of first ladies and gentlemen of Panama.

No.	Portrait	Name	President	Birth	Death	Period
1		María de la Ossa de Amador	Manuel Amador Guerrero	March 1, 1855	July 5, 1948	February 20, 1904 – October 1, 1908
		Manuela Jované Aguilar y Távara (died)	José Domingo de Obaldía		1887	
		Josefa Jované Aguilar y Távara	José Domingo de Obaldía			October 1, 1908 – March 1, 1910
		Rita Barsallo de Mendoza	Carlos Antonio Mendoza			March 1, 1910 – October 1, 1910
		Teodolinda Briceño de Boyd	Federico Boyd			October 1, 1910 - October 5, 1910
		Matilde Esperanza Picón Herrera	Pablo Arosemena			October 5, 1910 – October 1, 1912
		Eva Paniza Arosemena (separated)	Belisario Porras			
		Alicia Castro Gutiérrez de Porras	Belisario Porras			October 1, 1912 - October 1, 1916
		Diana Dutary Pérez	Ramón Maximiliano Valdés			October 1, 1916 – June 3, 1918
		Kerima Gutiérrez de Díaz	Pedro Antonio Díaz			October 1, 1918 - October 12, 1918
		Alicia Castro Gutiérrez de Porras	Belisario Porras			October 12, 1918 - January 30, 1920
		Oderay Arango de Lefevre	Ernesto T. Lefevre			January 30, 1920 - October 1, 1920
		Ofelina Remón de Chiari	Rodolfo Chiari			October 1, 1924 – October 1, 1928
		Hersilia Arias de Arosemena	Florencio Harmodio Arosemena			October 1, 1928 - January 3, 1931
		Rosario Guardia de Arias	Harmodio Arias Madrid			January 3, 1931 - January 16, 1931
		Amelia Lyons de Alfaro	Ricardo J. Alfaro	December 15, 1883	November 27, 1973	January 16, 1931 - June 5, 1932
		Rosario Guardia de Arias	Harmodio Arias Madrid			June 5, 1932 - October 1, 1936
		Malvina Galindo de Arosemena	Juan Demóstenes Arosemena			October 1, 1936 - December 16, 1939
		Adela Moré de Fernández	Ezequiel Fernández Jaén			December 16, 1939 - December 18, 1940
		Raquel de la Guardia de Boyd	Augusto Samuel Boyd			December 18, 1940 - October 1, 1940
		Ana Matilde Linares de Arias	Arnulfo Arias Madrid			October 1, 1940 - October 9, 1941
		Vacant	Ricardo de la Guardia			October 9, 1941 - March 4, 1943
		Carmen Estripeaut de la Guardia	Ricardo de la Guardia			March 4, 1943 - June 15, 1945
		Beatriz de la Guardia de Jiménez	Enrique A. Jiménez			June 15, 1945 - August 7, 1948
		Celia Quelquejeu de Díaz	Domingo Díaz Arosemena			August 7, 1948 - July 28, 1949
		Isabel Icaza de Chanis	Daniel Chanis Pinzón			July 28, 1949 - November 25, 1949
		Cecilia Orillac de Chiari	Roberto F. Chiari			November 20, 1949 - November 24, 1949
		Ana Matilde Linares de Arias	Arnulfo Arias Madrid			November 24, 1949 - May 9, 1951
		Heliodora Arosemena de Arosemena	Alcibíades Arosemena			May 9, 1951 - October 1, 1952
		Cecilia Pinel de Remón	José Remón Cantera			October 1, 1952 - January 2, 1955
		Olga Arias de Arias	Ricardo Arias Espinosa			March 29, 1955 - October 1, 1956
		Mercedes Galindo de la Guardia	Ernesto de la Guardia			October 1, 1956 - October 1, 1960
		Cecilia Orillac de Chiari	Roberto F. Chiari			October 1, 1960 - October 1, 1964
		Petita Saa de Robles	Marco Aurelio Robles			October 1, 1964 - October 1, 1968
		Mireya Moscoso de Arias	Arnulfo Arias Madrid	July 1, 1946		October 1, 1968 - October 11, 1968
		Elizabeth "Fanny" Rojer de Lakas	Demetrio B. Lakas			December 19, 1969 – October 11, 1978
		Adela Ruiz de Royo	Arístides Royo	December 15, 1943	June 19, 2019	October 11, 1978 – July 31, 1982
		Mercedes Martinez de la Espriella	Ricardo de la Espriella			July 31, 1982 – February 13, 1984
		Luzmila Arosemena de Illueca	Jorge Illueca			February 13, 1984 - October 11, 1984
		María Consuelo Rivera de Ardito Barletta	Nicolás Ardito Barletta			October 11, 1984 - September 27, 1985
		Mariela de Delvalle	Eric Arturo Delvalle			September 28, 1985 - February 26, 1988
		Marcela Endara Cambra	Guillermo Endara		June, 1989	December 20, 1989 - June 11, 1990
		Ana Mae Diaz	Guillermo Endara	May 16, 1967		June 11, 1990 – September 1, 1994
		Dora Boyd de Perez Balladares	Ernesto Pérez Balladares	October 11, 1948		September 1, 1994 – September 1, 1999
		Ruby Moscoso	Mireya Moscoso	September 22, 1941	January 7, 2022	September 1, 1999 – September 1, 2004
		Vivian Fernández	Martín Torrijos	March 25, 1966		September 1, 2004 – July 1, 2009
		Marta Linares	Ricardo Martinelli	September 2, 1956		July 1, 2009 - July 1, 2014
		Lorena Castillo	Juan Carlos Varela	July 31, 1968		July 1, 2014 - July 1, 2019
		Yazmín Colón de Cortizo	Laurentino Cortizo	July 31, 1959		July 1, 2019 - July 1, 2024
		Maricel Cohen de Mulino	José Raúl Mulino			July 1, 2024 - Present
