= 2009 Panamanian general election =

- 3 May 2009
- Presidential election
- Turnout: 74.01% (▼2.87pp)
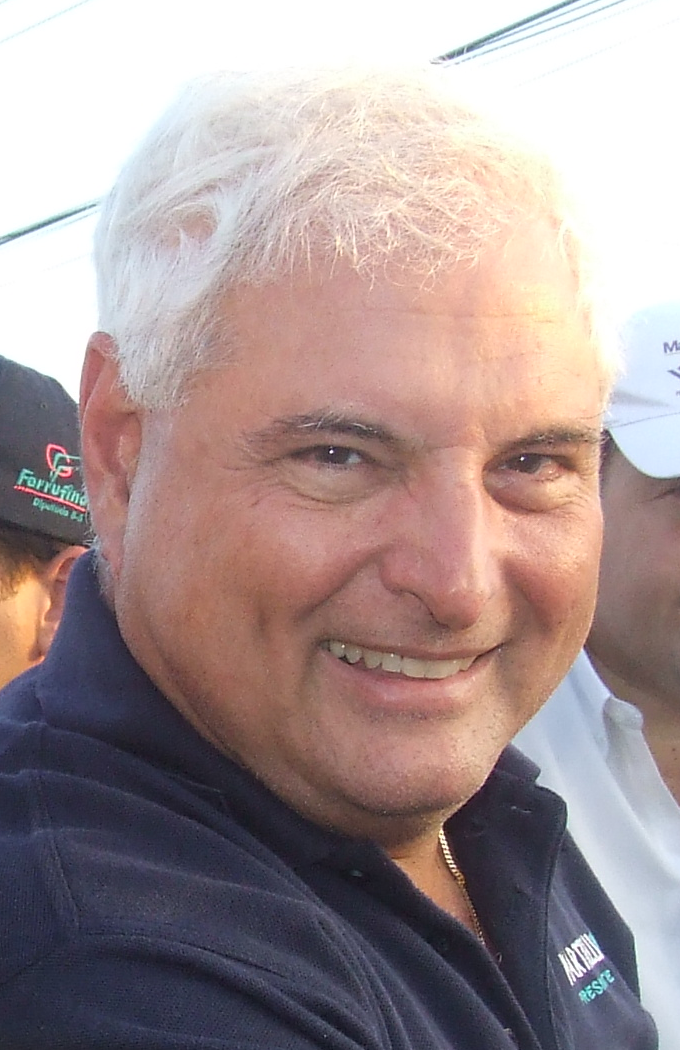

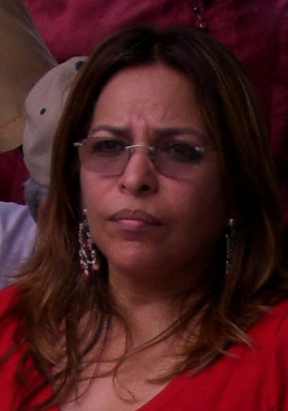
Nominee	Ricardo Martinelli	Balbina Herrera
Party	CD	PRD
Alliance	Alliance for Change	One Country for All
Popular vote	952,333	597,227
Percentage	60.03%	37.65%
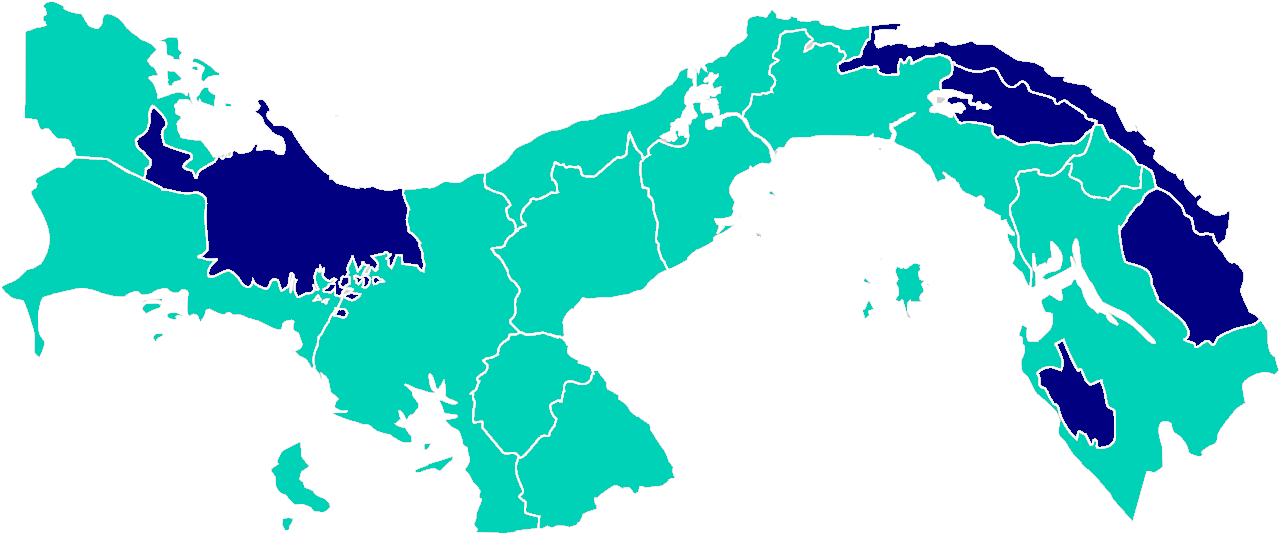
- Provinces won by Martinelli in aqua, by Herrera in blue.
President before election
Martín Torrijos
PRD
Elected President
Ricardo Martinelli
CD

General elections were held in Panama on May 3, 2009.

== Presidential race ==
Balbina Herrera was the Democratic Revolutionary Party (PRD) candidate for President of Panama. She had previously served as President of the National Assembly during the Mireya Moscoso presidency, and Housing Minister under outgoing president Martin Torrijos. Herrera won her party's primary on September 7, 2008, defeating Panama City Mayor Juan Carlos Navarro with a ten-point lead. The Liberal Party and the People's Party were in alliance with the PRD in support of Herrera. Herrera was also endorsed by Ruben Blades, a popular salsa musician who had previously run for president and served as Torrijos' Minister of Tourism, and was initially considered the favorite for the presidency. If elected, she would have become Panama's second female president.

Ricardo Martinelli was the candidate of the opposition Democratic Change, also supported by the Patriotic Union Party, the Panameñista Party and the Nationalist Republican Liberal Movement. Martinelli was a successful businessman, and was the chairman of the board of Panama's Super 99 supermarket chain. During the presidency of Ernesto Pérez Balladares, Martinelli had served as Director of Social Security from 1994 to 1996. From September 1999 to January 2003, he had served in the Moscoso Administration as Chairman of the Board of Directors of the Panama Canal and as the Minister for Canal Affairs.

Guillermo Endara, former Panamanian president from 1989 to 1994, ran as the candidate for the Fatherland's Moral Vanguard Party.

Though initially the favorite, Herrera was damaged in the election by her links to former military ruler Manuel Noriega and by the perception that she was a "Chavista", a supporter of leftist Venezuelan president Hugo Chavez. Martinelli was also helped by strong support from the business community and his campaign promise of "real change" resonated among poor voters.

On May 3, 2009, Martinelli won the national elections by a landslide, with over 60% of the votes compared to Herrera, who received about 36%. Former president Guillermo Endara finished a distant third. Martinelli was declared the winner after 43.68% of the votes had been counted. This was the second-largest majority in Panamanian history, and the largest since 1989. It was also the first time since 1989 that the winning candidate was not a member of the PRD or Panameñista Party. Martinelli's victory was an exception to a trend of victories for left-leaning Latin American candidates. He was sworn in on July 1, 2009.

== Results ==
=== President ===
Candidate	Party or alliance		Votes	%
Ricardo Martinelli	Alliance for Change	Democratic Change	509,986	32.15
Ricardo Martinelli	Alliance for Change	Panameñista Party	293,554	18.50
Ricardo Martinelli	Alliance for Change	Patriotic Union	53,952	3.40
Ricardo Martinelli	Alliance for Change	Nationalist Republican Liberal Movement	94,841	5.98
Ricardo Martinelli	Alliance for Change	Total	952,333	60.03
Balbina Herrera	One Country for All	Democratic Revolutionary Party	553,974	34.92
Balbina Herrera	One Country for All	People's Party	35,459	2.24
Balbina Herrera	One Country for All	Liberal Party	7,794	0.49
Balbina Herrera	One Country for All	Total	597,227	37.65
Guillermo Endara	Moral Vanguard of the Fatherland		36,867	2.32
Total			1,586,427	100.00
Valid votes			1,586,427	96.94
Invalid/blank votes			50,081	3.06
Total votes			1,636,508	100.00
Registered voters/turnout			2,211,261	74.01
Source: Tribunal Electoral

=== Legislative Assembly ===
Party or alliance		Votes	%	Seats
Alliance for Change	Democratic Change	352,319	23.42	14
Alliance for Change	Panameñista Party	334,282	22.22	22
Alliance for Change	Patriotic Union	85,609	5.69	4
Alliance for Change	Nationalist Republican Liberal Movement	70,457	4.68	2
Alliance for Change	Total	842,667	56.02	42
One Country for All	Democratic Revolutionary Party	537,426	35.72	26
One Country for All	People's Party	55,598	3.70	1
One Country for All	Liberal Party	18,111	1.20	0
One Country for All	Total	611,135	40.62	27
Moral Vanguard of the Fatherland		14,760	0.98	0
Independents		35,793	2.38	2
Total		1,504,355	100.00	71
Valid votes		1,504,355	93.79	
Invalid/blank votes		99,582	6.21	
Total votes		1,603,937	100.00	
Registered voters/turnout		2,211,261	72.53	
Source: Tribunal Electoral
