= 2004 Panamanian general election =

- 2 May 2004
- Presidential election
- Turnout: 76.88% (▲0.71pp)
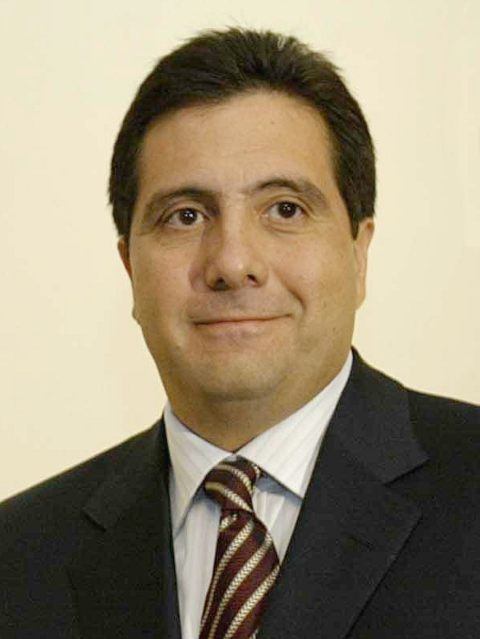

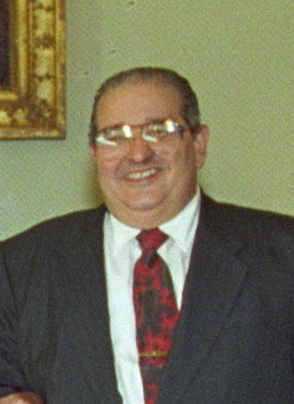

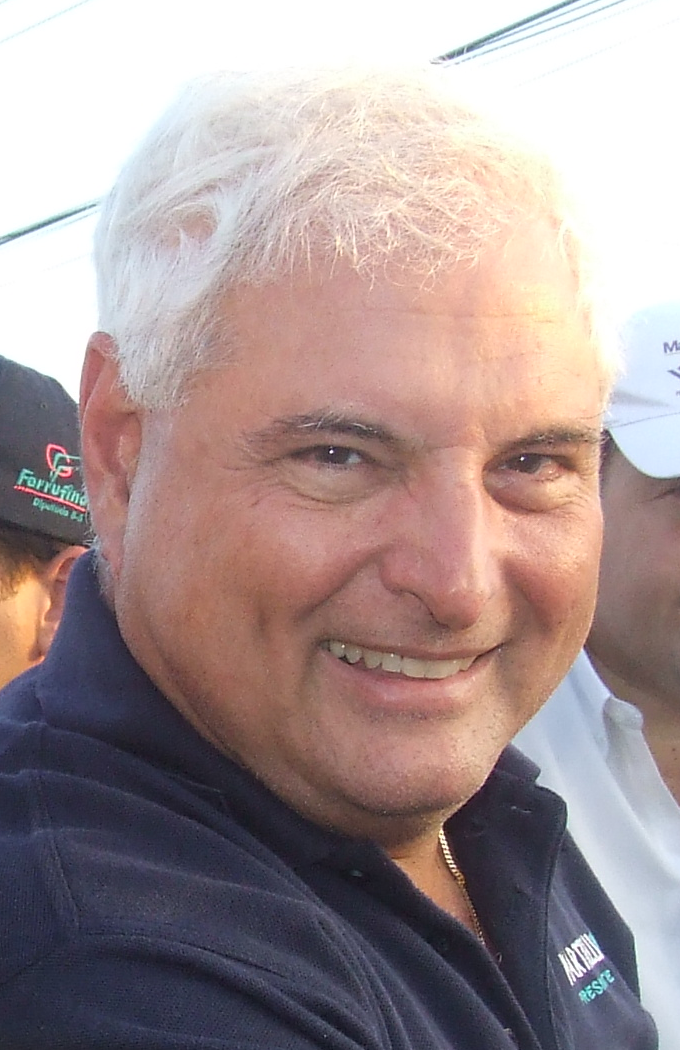
| Nominee | Martín Torrijos | Guillermo Endara |
| Party | PRD | Solidarity |
| Popular vote | 711,164 | 462,824 |
| Percentage | 47.44% | 30.87% |
| Nominee | José Miguel Alemán | Ricardo Martinelli |
| Party | Arnulfista | CD |
| Popular vote | 245,568 | 79,491 |
| Percentage | 16.38% | 5.30% |
President before election
Mireya Moscoso
Panameñista
Elected President
Martin Torrijos
PRD

General elections were held in Panama on Sunday, 2 May 2004, electing both a new President of the Republic and a new Legislative Assembly.

== Results ==
=== President ===
For the second consecutive election, Martín Torrijos, son of former military ruler Omar Torrijos, was named the candidate of the Democratic Revolutionary Party (PRD); in 1999, he had lost to Mireya Moscoso. Torrijos ran on a platform of strengthening democracy and negotiating a free trade agreement with the US, and was supported by popular musician and politician Rubén Blades; Torrijos later made Blades the nation's tourism minister. Torrijos' primary rival was Guillermo Endara, who had served as president from 1990 to 1994. Endara ran as the candidate of the Solidarity Party, on a platform of reducing crime and government corruption. Endara and the other candidates also ran a series of negative ads highlighting the PRD's connections with former military ruler Manuel Noriega. Endara finished second in the race, receiving 31% of the vote to Torrijos' 47%.

Torrijos assumed office on 1 September 2004. Voters also elected his two vice-presidents, who run on party tickets in conjunction with the presidential candidates.

| Candidate | Party or alliance | | Votes | % |
|---|---|---|---|---|
| Martín Torrijos | New Fatherland | Democratic Revolutionary Party | 649,157 | 43.30 |
| Martín Torrijos | New Fatherland | People's Party | 62,007 | 4.14 |
| Martín Torrijos | New Fatherland | Total | 711,164 | 47.44 |
| Guillermo Endara | Solidarity Party | | 462,824 | 30.87 |
| José Miguel Alemán | Vision of the Country | Arnulfista Party | 162,830 | 10.86 |
| José Miguel Alemán | Vision of the Country | Nationalist Republican Liberal Movement | 60,106 | 4.01 |
| José Miguel Alemán | Vision of the Country | National Liberal Party | 22,632 | 1.51 |
| José Miguel Alemán | Vision of the Country | Total | 245,568 | 16.38 |
| Ricardo Martinelli | Democratic Change | | 79,491 | 5.30 |
| Total | | | 1,499,047 | 100.00 |
| Valid votes | | | 1,499,047 | 97.51 |
| Invalid/blank votes | | | 38,295 | 2.49 |
| Total votes | | | 1,537,342 | 100.00 |
| Registered voters/turnout | | | 1,999,553 | 76.88 |
Source: Nohlen

=== Legislative Assembly ===
In addition to its president and vice presidents, Panama elected a new Legislative Assembly (78 members), 20 deputies to represent the country at the Central American Parliament, and a string of mayors and other municipal officers.

| Party or alliance | | Votes | % | Seats |
|---|---|---|---|---|
| New Fatherland | Democratic Revolutionary Party | 549,948 | 37.85 | 41 |
| New Fatherland | People's Party | 86,727 | 5.97 | 1 |
| New Fatherland | Total | 636,675 | 43.82 | 42 |
| Vision of the Country | Arnulfista Party | 279,560 | 19.24 | 17 |
| Vision of the Country | Nationalist Republican Liberal Movement | 125,547 | 8.64 | 4 |
| Vision of the Country | National Liberal Party | 76,191 | 5.24 | 3 |
| Vision of the Country | Total | 481,298 | 33.12 | 24 |
| Solidarity Party | | 227,604 | 15.66 | 9 |
| Democratic Change | | 107,511 | 7.40 | 3 |
| Total | | 1,453,088 | 100.00 | 78 |
| Valid votes | | 1,453,088 | 95.29 | |
| Invalid/blank votes | | 71,888 | 4.71 | |
| Total votes | | 1,524,976 | 100.00 | |
| Registered voters/turnout | | 1,999,553 | 76.27 | |
Source: Nohlen

The Panama City mayor race was won also by the PRD. Mayor Juan Carlos Navarro was re-elected.
