= 1989 Panamanian general election =

- 7 May 1989
- Presidential election
- Turnout: 60.48% (first round) ▼12.65pp 63.85% (second round)
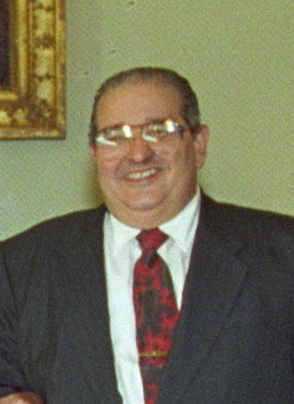

| Nominee | Guillermo Endara | Carlos Duque |
| Party | Independent | PRD |
| Alliance | Democratic Alliance of Civic Opposition | National Liberation Coalition |
| Running mate | Ricardo Arias Calderón | Ernesto Pérez Balladares |
| Popular vote | 473,838 | 188,914 |
| Percentage | 71.19% | 28.38% |
- Results by province
President before election
Manuel Solís Palma
PRD
Elected President
Election results annulled (Note: Guillermo Endara subsequently recognized as the winner of the election and sworn in during the US invasion of Panama on 20 December 1989; annulment later revoked.)
Provisional government established

General elections were held in Panama on 7 May 1989, with the goal of electing both a new President of the Republic and a new Legislative Assembly. The two primary candidates in the presidential race were Guillermo Endara, who headed Democratic Alliance of Civic Opposition (ADOC), a coalition opposed to military ruler Manuel Noriega, and Carlos Duque, who headed the pro-Noriega Democratic Revolutionary Party (PRD).

However, the election was annulled before voting was completed by Noriega's government, and Endara and his running mate Guillermo Ford were attacked in front of foreign media by Noriega supporters, events that contributed to the US invasion of Panama in December of that year. During the invasion, Endara was declared the election's winner and sworn in as the new president of Panama.

== Background ==
The death of Arnulfo Arias in August 1988, a few days before his eighty-seventh birthday, removed a major obstacle to opposition unity, but also created several new problems. It left the opposition without a charismatic national leader to place at the head of any 1989 electoral ticket.

The Authentic Panameñista Party, Panama's leading opposition party, divided in December 1988. The Electoral Tribunal formally recognized the faction led by Hildebrando Nicosia Pérez as the legitimate party representative, entitling Nicosia and his colleagues to use the party symbols. According to the opposition, the government engineered the division in the party to sow confusion among the electorate. However, Nicosia's effort to present himself as the heir of Arias was singularly unsuccessful according to the opposition's election results, which showed him receiving less than one percent of the vote.

The PPA's main body, including a majority of the party's hierarchy, joined the anti-government Democratic Alliance of Civic Opposition (ADOC); the party's secretary-general, Guillermo Endara, was ADOC's presidential candidate. Denied use of the PPA symbol, Endara and the party's legislative candidates competed under the banner of the Authentic Liberal Party, which is the product of a schism that developed in the Liberal Party prior to the 1984 elections. The military rule of Manuel Noriega also provoked a split in the Republican Party (RP), but the majority of the legitimate leadership of the RP participated in the ADOC coalition. Two other major parties—the PDC and MOLIRENA—were also part of ADOC. ADOC also had the support of the small Popular Action Party (PAPA), and National Peoples Party (PNP), and defectors from the Liberal and Republican parties, and a dissident faction of the PPA. In addition to Endara, ADOC's electoral slate included Ricardo Arias Calderón of the PDC for first vice president and Guillermo Ford of MOLIRENA for second vice president.

Pro-government parties (the PRD, PALA, PR, PL, PPR, PPP, PAN, and PDT) had formed a new electoral coalition, the National Liberation Coalition (COLINA). The PRD was the coalition's leading party and its president, Carlos Alberto Duque Jaén, a business associate of Noriega, was the coalition's presidential candidate. COLINA's other significant party was PALA, led by Ramón Sieiro Murgas, the coalition's candidate for first vice president and a brother-in-law of Noriega. COLINA's candidate for second vice president was Aquilino Boyd, former foreign minister, and former ambassador to the United States, the United Nations and, most recently, the Organization of American States. COLINA, in presenting a united slate for the legislature, contained a broad ideological spectrum that included Communist Party members, businessmen and professionals.

== Results ==
An exit poll of 1,022 voters gave the opposition an overwhelming victory: 55.1% for Endara, but only 39.5% for Duque. The margin shocked Noriega, who either was misled by advisers or really believed that the election would be close enough to manipulate with minimal fraud. Suspecting that Noriega would never allow an honest vote, ADOC organized a count of results from election precincts before they were sent to district centers. As it turned out, Noriega's cronies had taken bogus tally sheets to the district centers in order to make it appear Duque had won in a landslide.

On 9 May government-released results gave a clear-cut lead to Duque. By this time, however, the opposition's count was already out. It showed Endara winning in a landslide, with a nearly 3-to-1 lead over Duque. Opposition forces—as well as foreign observers and the clergy—thereupon claimed massive election irregularities. Parliamentary results also indicated an opposition victory.

=== President ===
| Candidate | Party or alliance | | Initial results | | Final release | |
| Candidate | Party or alliance | | Votes | % | Votes | % |
|---|---|---|---|---|---|---|
| Guillermo Endara | Democratic Alliance of Civic Opposition | Christian Democratic Party | 261,598 | 40.18 | 473,838 | 71.19 |
| Guillermo Endara | Democratic Alliance of Civic Opposition | Nationalist Republican Liberal Movement | 132,011 | 20.28 | 473,838 | 71.19 |
| Guillermo Endara | Democratic Alliance of Civic Opposition | Authentic Liberal Party | 69,779 | 10.72 | 473,838 | 71.19 |
| Guillermo Endara | Democratic Alliance of Civic Opposition | Total | 463,388 | 71.18 | 473,838 | 71.19 |
| Carlos Duque | National Liberation Coalition | Democratic Revolutionary Party | 120,564 | 18.52 | 188,914 | 28.38 |
| Carlos Duque | National Liberation Coalition | Labor and Agrarian Party | 35,264 | 5.42 | 188,914 | 28.38 |
| Carlos Duque | National Liberation Coalition | Liberal Party | 12,718 | 1.95 | 188,914 | 28.38 |
| Carlos Duque | National Liberation Coalition | Republican Party | 5,584 | 0.86 | 188,914 | 28.38 |
| Carlos Duque | National Liberation Coalition | Revolutionary Panameñista Party | 5,533 | 0.85 | 188,914 | 28.38 |
| Carlos Duque | National Liberation Coalition | People's Party of Panama | 2,919 | 0.45 | 188,914 | 28.38 |
| Carlos Duque | National Liberation Coalition | Nationalist Action Party | 1,463 | 0.22 | 188,914 | 28.38 |
| Carlos Duque | National Liberation Coalition | Democratic Worker's Party | 855 | 0.13 | 188,914 | 28.38 |
| Carlos Duque | National Liberation Coalition | Total | 184,900 | 28.40 | 188,914 | 28.38 |
| Hildebrando Nicosia Pérez | Authentic Panameñista Party | | 2,750 | 0.42 | 2,822 | 0.42 |
| Total | | | 651,038 | 100.00 | 665,574 | 100.00 |
| Valid votes | | | 651,038 | 90.70 | 665,574 | 87.83 |
| Invalid/blank votes | | | 66,733 | 9.30 | 92,223 | 12.17 |
| Total votes | | | 717,771 | 100.00 | 757,797 | 100.00 |
| Registered voters/turnout | | | 1,186,754 | 60.48 | 1,186,754 | 63.85 |
Source: Carter Center, Nohlen

==== By province ====
| Province | Endara ADOC | Duque COLINA | Nicosia PPA |
|---|---|---|---|
| Bocas del Toro | 70.15% | 27.76% | 0.46% |
| Coclé | 59.99% | 29.70% | 0.39% |
| Colón | 75.63% | 20.31% | 0.41% |
| Chiriquí | 65.18% | 26.86% | 0.46% |
| Darién | 40.29% | 39.64% | 0.21% |
| Herrera | 62.78% | 28.56% | 0.11% |
| Los Santos | 59.03% | 33.93% | 0.19% |
| Panamá | 66.92% | 22.10% | 0.41% |
| Veraguas | 54.21% | 34.76% | 0.23% |
| San Blas | 34.40% | 65.31% | 0.28% |
| Total | 71.19% | 28.38% | 0.42% |
Source: Carter Center

=== National Assembly ===
| Party or alliance | | Votes | % | Seats | | |
| Party or alliance | | Votes | % | 1989 | 1991 | Total |
|---|---|---|---|---|---|---|
| Democratic Alliance of Civic Opposition | Christian Democratic Party | 219,944 | 36.10 | 27 | 2 | 29 |
| Democratic Alliance of Civic Opposition | Nationalist Republican Liberal Movement | 122,974 | 20.19 | 15 | 2 | 17 |
| Democratic Alliance of Civic Opposition | Authentic Liberal Party | 61,916 | 10.16 | 9 | 0 | 9 |
| Democratic Alliance of Civic Opposition | Total | 404,834 | 66.45 | 51 | 4 | 55 |
| National Liberation Coalition | Democratic Revolutionary Party | 114,741 | 18.83 | 6 | 4 | 10 |
| National Liberation Coalition | Labor and Agrarian Party | 47,775 | 7.84 | 1 | 0 | 1 |
| National Liberation Coalition | Liberal Party | 17,712 | 2.91 | 0 | 1 | 1 |
| National Liberation Coalition | Republican Party | 8,602 | 1.41 | 0 | 0 | 0 |
| National Liberation Coalition | People's Party of Panama | 4,988 | 0.82 | 0 | 0 | 0 |
| National Liberation Coalition | Nationalist Action Party | 3,572 | 0.59 | 0 | 0 | 0 |
| National Liberation Coalition | Revolutionary Panameñista Party | 2,917 | 0.48 | 0 | 0 | 0 |
| National Liberation Coalition | Democratic Worker's Party | 1,075 | 0.18 | 0 | 0 | 0 |
| National Liberation Coalition | Total | 201,382 | 33.06 | 7 | 5 | 12 |
| Authentic Panameñista Party | | 3,015 | 0.49 | 0 | 0 | 0 |
| Total | | 609,231 | 100.00 | 58 | 9 | 67 |
Source: Nohlen

== Aftermath ==
Noriega had intended to declare Duque the winner regardless of the actual count. However, Duque knew that he had been soundly defeated and refused to go along. On 10 May, the president of the Electoral Tribunal read a statement signed by all three magistrates annulling the elections. The statement alluded to the fact that the great number of irregularities across the country made counting the votes impossible. The next day, Endara and his running mate Ford were badly beaten by a detachment of Dignity Battalions, a paramilitary group supporting Noriega. Endara was struck with an iron club and was briefly hospitalized, receiving eight stitches. Images of the attack on Endara and Ford were carried by media around the world, and were credited with building public support for the US invasion that would soon follow.

The nullification decree coupled with the attack on Endara and Ford outraged Panamanians and the international community. In an emergency session on 17 May, the Organization of American States adopted a resolution condemning the regime for its actions. Former US President Jimmy Carter, one of the election observers, was placed under brief house arrest by Noriega's forces to prevent him from speaking to the press. At a later press conference, he called for an international response to the stolen election, then addressed the Noriega administration directly, asking "Are you honest people, or are you thieves?"

On 31 August 1989, the Council of State dissolved the National Assembly, named a provisional government headed by ex-Attorney General Francisco Rodríguez, and announced that he would consider holding another election in six months.

The immediate events that triggered the invasion began on December 15, when Panama's hand-picked National Assembly declared Noriega the de jure head of state, giving him the title of Maximum Leader. Then the assembly, citing aggression against the Panamanian people, declared the republic in a state of war with the United States. On 20 December, 24,000 US troops invaded Panama in Operation Just Cause, deposing Noriega.

Endara had by this time taken refuge in the Panama Canal Zone, which was under US control. Though Endara had opposed US military action during his campaign, he accepted the presidency, stating later that, "morally, patriotically, civically I had no other choice". He was certified the winner of the election and inaugurated on a US military base on December 20. Ricardo Arias Calderón was inaugurated as first vice president, and Ford as second vice president.

On 27 December, the Electoral Tribunal revoked the annulment of the general elections held on 7 May. Working on voting returns of the May 1989 elections, on 23 February 1990, the tribunal confirmed the election of 58 of the 67 legislators, with 51 seats going to the ADOC coalition and only six to the pro-Noriega PRD. On 27 January 1991, by-elections were held for the nine seats of the Legislative Assembly which could not be filled at the May 1989 general elections. The PRD's victory in five of the seats deepened internal divisions in the government coalition.
