= Manuel Solís Palma =

Panamanian president (1917–2009)

President of Panama
- In office 26 February 1988 – 1 September 1989
- Military Leader: Manuel Noriega
- Vice President: First Vice President; Vacant; Second Vice President; Vacant
- Preceded by: Eric Arturo Delvalle
- Succeeded by: Francisco Rodríguez

Personal details
- Born: Manuel Solís Palma; 3 December 1917 Los Santos, Panama
- Died: 6 November 2009 (aged 91) Panama City, Panama
- Party: Democratic Revolutionary Party
- Spouse: Thelma Hassan

Manuel Solís Palma (3 December 1917 in Los Santos Province – 6 November 2009) was the acting president of Panama from 26 February 1988 to 1 September 1989, under the military rule of Manuel Noriega. He served as education minister in several administrations, and worked on the 1968 presidential campaign of Arnulfo Arias Madrid.

In February 1988, Noriega promoted Solís from education minister to president after the firing of president Eric Arturo Delvalle. The US administration of president Ronald Reagan refused to recognize Solís or the diplomats representing him as legitimate. In May, the administration offered a deal in which Noriega would leave office in exchange for the US dropping drug charges against him; however, the Panamanian military rejected the terms, which gave no guarantee that Solís would retain power. Solís served until 1 September 1989, shortly before the US invasion of Panama which deposed Noriega. He was later described as one of a series of Noriega's puppet rulers, nicknamed the "Kleenex presidents" in Panama due to their "disposability". In 1994, he was pardoned by President Guillermo Endara for any crimes committed during the Noriega years.

In the administration of Martín Torrijos (2004–2009), Solís served again as advisor to the education minister.

He died on 6 November 2009, aged 91, from pulmonary edema in Panama City.

Preceded by Eric Arturo Delvalle	President of Panama; 1988–1989	Succeeded by Francisco Rodríguez
