= People's Party (Panama) =

Christian democratic party in Panama

People's Party Partido Popular
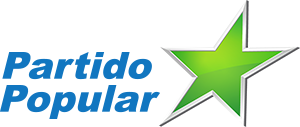
- President: Daniel Brea
- Founded: 1956 (AD); 1957 (UCN); 1960 (PDC); 2001 (PP)
- Headquarters: María Building (floors 2 and 3), Perú Avenue, Plaza Porras. Panama City, Panama
- Membership (2023): 17,408
- Ideology: Christian democracy Conservatism; Subsidiarity; Anti-communism
- Political position: Centre-right
- Regional affiliation: Christian Democratic Organization of America
- International affiliation: Centrist Democrat International
- Colours: Blue, green
- Seats in the National Assembly: 2 / 71
- District Mayors: 5 / 81
- Corregimiento Representatives: 12 / 701
- Seats in the Central American Parliament (Panamanian seats): 5 / 20

Party flag

Website
- partidopopularpanama.com.pa

The People's Party (Spanish: Partido Popular, PP) is a Panamanian Christian democratic political party.

The party was founded in 1956 and was made up of middle-class professionals, intellectuals and students, with support from trade unions, particularly the Federation of Christian Workers. Its ideological foundation is based on the social doctrine of the Catholic Church. The PP is a full member of the Christian Democrat International and Christian Democratic Organization of America.

== History ==
The People's Party traces its origins to the “First Week of Christian Studies,” which met at Las Cumbres in March 1956. Those who participated in this and the “Second Week of Christian Studies” in July 1956 included intellectuals who had expressed their desire for Social Christian action. The group that organized these meetings formally established itself on 12 April 1956 and first called itself Social Democratic Action (Acción Social Demócrata). From 1957 to 1960 it called itself the National Civic Union (Unión Cívica Naciona) for the Christian Democratic Movement. In 1960, the organizers decided on the name Christian Democratic Party of Panama (Partido Demócrata Cristiano de Panama, PDC).

The PDC's leading figures were middle-class professionals, intellectuals and students, but support also came from the trade union. In particular, the Federation of Christian Workers, established in 1961, was closely aligned with the PDC.

Early in 1964 the party chose its first set of candidates for a national election. For that year's elections, the PDC presented its first presidential candidate, José Antonio Molino, who was supported by Panama's Teachers Union. He received 9,681 votes (2.98%), coming in fourth among seven nominees. That was considered a success for the new party and was enough to assure its registration as a legal party. The Christian Democrats continued to be a small but well-organized element in Panamanian politics in the succeeding years. In the 1968 general election, the PDC candidate, Antonio González Revilla, received 11,371 votes (3.55%). In 1964 and 1968 the PDC won one parliamentary seat.

In 1968, the radical wing of the leadership was expelled, and the increasingly conservative party supported the government of Arnulfo Arias. It was backed by a tiny electorate consisting of urban professionals and a business group led by the Romero family. Arias chose a member of the PDC as minister of education, but his government lasted only 11 days.

All political parties such as the PDC were banned by Omar Torrijos after the military coup of 1968. During the Torrijos government (1968–1978), the Christian Democrats opposed the military regime and called for a civilian-ruled democracy. In the 1970s and the 1980s, the PDC was generally regarded as a well-organized and binding element of the opposition. The PDC was one of the few parties within National Opposition Front (FRENO) (a coalition of eight opposition parties formed in March 1979) that offered a programmatic alternative to military government policy by calling for substantial social reforms and expanded participation in democratic processes. The PDC advocated for introducing nationalist social reforms to preclude revolutionary action. Its leader, Ricardo Arias Calderón, was the main promoter of the formation of a united opposition against the Democratic Revolutionary Party (PRD). The leaders of the party strongly opposed the government, seeing in its actions "a furthering of communist penetration into Central America."

The PDC re-registered on 28 August 1980. The PDC won 20.6% of the vote and two seats in the 1980 legislative elections (to 19 of the 56 seats in the newly formed National Legislative Council, the other 37 being filled by nominees of a non-party National Assembly of Community Representatives established in 1972).

In December 1981, Calderón was elected president of the Organization of Christian-Democratic Parties of America.

In 1984, it was part of the Democratic Opposition Alliance (ADO), which supported the presidential candidacy of Arnulfo Arias of Authentic Panameñista Party (PPA). Ricardo Arias Calderón was a Second Vice-Presidential candidate. The ADO lost the presidential and legislative elections following suspected widespread fraud by the military. In 1987, the PDC became increasingly involved in confrontations with the government, openly campaigning by strikes (supported mainly by businesses rather than labor unions) and street demonstrations (which were often violently repressed) for the resignation or removal of General Manuel Noriega. Ricardo Arias Calderón referring to charges against Manuel Noriega of murder, drug trafficking, corruption, and electoral fraud, described him as "virtually a dictator and gangster".

For the 1989 elections, the PDC was the main component of the Democratic Alliance of Civic Opposition (ADOC), with the Guillermo Endara as the coalition's presidential candidate. Calderón was viewed as a likely successor to Arias as the principal spokesman for the opposition, eventually accepting nomination as ADOC First Vice-Presidential candidate in 1989.

The PDC polled 261,598 votes (40.18%), coming in first among twelve nominees. After the official ratification of the results following the US military invasion in December 1989, Calderón became First Vice-President and Interior and Justice Minister, and the PDC became the largest party in the Legislative Assembly with 28 of the 67 seats. Emboldened by a plurality within the Legislative Assembly, the PDC was estranged from its coalition partners in September 1990 when they joined with the opposition PRD to reject its nominees for chamber officials. The party stayed within the ADOC until April 1991, when its ministerial delegation was ousted by President Guillermo Endara for displaying "disloyalty and arrogance." That had followed months of infighting during which Calderón had publicly described Guillermo Endara's economic program, which advocated severe austerity measures and the privatization of state enterprises, as "senseless." Its withdrawal from the ADOC coalition government caused a political crisis.

In succeeding months, the PDC became the leader of the opposition, to such an extent that it was exerting strong influence within such organizations as the Civic Crusade, an organization from which Endara had drawn his strongest support and called for a plebiscite to decide on his desirability of Endara remaining in office. In September 1991, the PDC was judged firmly to have secured its political influence on parliamentary committees as a direct result of facilitating the victory of a dissident Authentic Liberal Party (PLA) candidate in the election of a new President of the Legislative Assembly. Calderón resigned as First Vice-President of the Republic in December 1992 in a move that was seen as reflecting a desire to distance himself from Endara.

In 1994, Eduardo Vallarino, the candidate of PDC, unsuccessfully ran in the presidential elections, obtaining only 25,476 votes (2.39%). As a result, the party only managed to gain one seat in the legislative elections. For the 1999 elections, the PDC was the main component of the Opposition Action Alliance (AAO), with the PDC's Alberto Vallarino Clement as the coalition's presidential candidate. He polled 221,459 votes (17.38%) and came fourth (the PDC – 140,824 and 11.05%). The PDC won 5 legislative seats.

On 10 September 2001, the PDC changed its name to People's Party. In 2004, the PP allied with the New Fatherland (PN) and its candidate Martín Torrijos Espino of Democratic Revolutionary Party (PRD). In 2009, the PP allied with the One Country for All (UPPT) and its candidate Balbina Herrera of Democratic Revolutionary Party (PRD).

In 2014, the PP allied with the Panameñista Party and its candidate Juan Carlos Varela to form the El Pueblo Primero alliance, which won the election with 39% of the vote on May 4, 2014. As a result, several members of the party served in the Varela Administration, highlighted by the party's president Milton Henriquez serving as Minister of Government. It went on to be described as among Latin America's most conservative and anti-communist Christian democratic parties.

The PP is a full member of the Christian Democrat International and Christian Democratic Organization of America.

== Election results ==
=== Presidential elections ===
| Election | Candidate | Votes | | Vote % | | Result |
| Election | Candidate | Party | Alliance Total | Party | Alliance Total | Result |
|---|---|---|---|---|---|---|
| 1964 | José Antonio Molino | 9,681 | | 3.05 | | ✗ Lost |
| 1968 | Antonio González Revilla | 11,371 | | 3.55 | | ✗ Lost |
| 1972 | Not allowed to run | | | | | |
| 1978 | Not allowed to run | | | | | |
| 1984 | Arnulfo Arias | 46,963 | 299,035 | 7.34 | 46.71 | ✗ Lost |
| 1989 | Guillermo Endara | 261,598 | 463,388 | 40.18 | 71.18 | ✓ Elected |
| 1994 | Eduardo Vallarino | 25,476 | | 2.39 | | ✗ Lost |
| 1999 | Alberto Vallarino | 141,283 | 222,250 | 11.05 | 17.38 | ✗ Lost |
| 2004 | Martín Torrijos | 62,007 | 711,164 | 4.14 | 47.44 | ✓ Elected |
| 2009 | Balbina Herrera | 35,459 | 597,227 | 2.24 | 37.65 | ✗ Lost |
| 2014 | Juan Carlos Varela | 161,178 | 724,762 | 8.69 | 39.09 | ✓ Elected |
| 2019 | José Blandón | 38,818 | 212,931 | 1.98 | 10.84 | ✗ Lost |
| 2024 | Martín Torrijos | 364,576 | | 16.03 | | ✗ Lost |

=== National Assembly elections ===
| Election | Leader | Votes | % | Seats | +/– | Government |
|---|---|---|---|---|---|---|
| 1964 | José Antonio Molino | | | 1 / 42 | New | Opposition |
| 1968 | Antonio González Revilla | | | 1 / 42 | 0 | Opposition |
| 1972 | Not allowed to run | | | 0 / 42 | ▼1 | Extra-parliamentary |
| 1978 | Not allowed to run | | | 0 / 42 | 0 | Extra-parliamentary |
| 1980 | Ricardo Arias Calderón | 155,453 | 20.7% (#3) | 2 / 57 | ▲2 | Opposition |
| 1984 | Ricardo Arias Calderón | 69,998 | 11.49% (#4) | 6 / 67 | ▲4 | Opposition |
| 1989 | Ricardo Arias Calderón | 219,944 | 36.10% (#1) | 29 / 67 | ▲25 | Coalition |
| 1994 | Eduardo Vallarino | 66,411 | 6.43% (#7) | 1 / 72 | ▼28 | Opposition |
| 1999 | Alberto Vallarino | 107,179 | 8.72% (#3) | 5 / 71 | ▲4 | Opposition |
| 2004 | Rubén Arosemena | 86,727 | 5.97% (#6) | 1 / 78 | ▼4 | Coalition |
| 2009 | Rubén Arosemena | 55,598 | 3.70% (#6) | 1 / 71 | 0 | Opposition |
| 2014 | Milton Henríquez | 56,629 | 3.33% (#5) | 1 / 71 | 0 | Coalition |
| 2019 | Juan Carlos Arango | 65,028 | 3.60% (#5) | 0 / 71 | ▼0 | Opposition |
| 2024 | Juan Carlos Arango | 128,504 | 6.01% (#6) | 2 / 71 | ▲2 | Opposition |

=== PARLACEN elections ===
The amount of seats allocated for the PARLACEN is based on the vote share obtained by each party in the presidential election.

| Election | Leader | Votes | % | Seats | +/– |
|---|---|---|---|---|---|
| 2019 | Juan Carlos Arango | 38,818 | 1.98% (#7) | 1 / 20 | |
| 2024 | Juan Carlos Arango | 364,576 | 16.03% (#3) | 5 / 20 | ▲4 |

== Sources ==
- Ameringer, Charles D. (1992). Political parties of the Americas, 1980s to 1990s: Canada, Latin America, and the West Indies. Greenwood Publishing Group. ISBN 978-0-313-27418-3.
- Banks, Arthur S. (1993). Political Handbook of the World 1993. CSA Publications. ISBN 978-0-933199-09-5.
- Nohlen, Dieter (2005). Elections in the Americas: a data handbook. North America, Central America and the Caribbean, Volym 1. Oxford University Press. ISBN 978-0-19-928358-3.
