= Patriotic Union =

Patriotic Union is a name held by political parties in some countries:

- Patriotic Union (Chile) (Spanish: Unión Patriótica)
- Patriotic Union (Colombia) (Spanish: Unión Patriótica)
- Patriotic Union (Greek: Πατριωτική Ένωση), the former name of Patriotic Force – Prodromos Emfietzoglou
- Patriotic Union (Kurdistan) (Kurdish: یەکێتیی نیشتمانیی کوردستان)
- Patriotic Union (Liechtenstein) (German: Vaterländische Union)
- Patriotic Union (Lithuania) (Limburgish: Tėvynės sąjunga)
- Patriotic Union (Panama) (Spanish: Unión Patriótica)
- Patriotic Union (Spain) (Spanish: Unión Patriótica)

Other organizations with the phrase "Patriotic Union" in their name include:

- Free Patriotic Union (Arabic: الاتحاد الوطني الحرّ), Tunisia
- Patriotic Union for Democracy and Progress, Congo
- Patriotic Union, German far-right group
