= Lorena Castillo =

Panamanian journalist and politician (born 1968)

Lorena Castillo de Varela
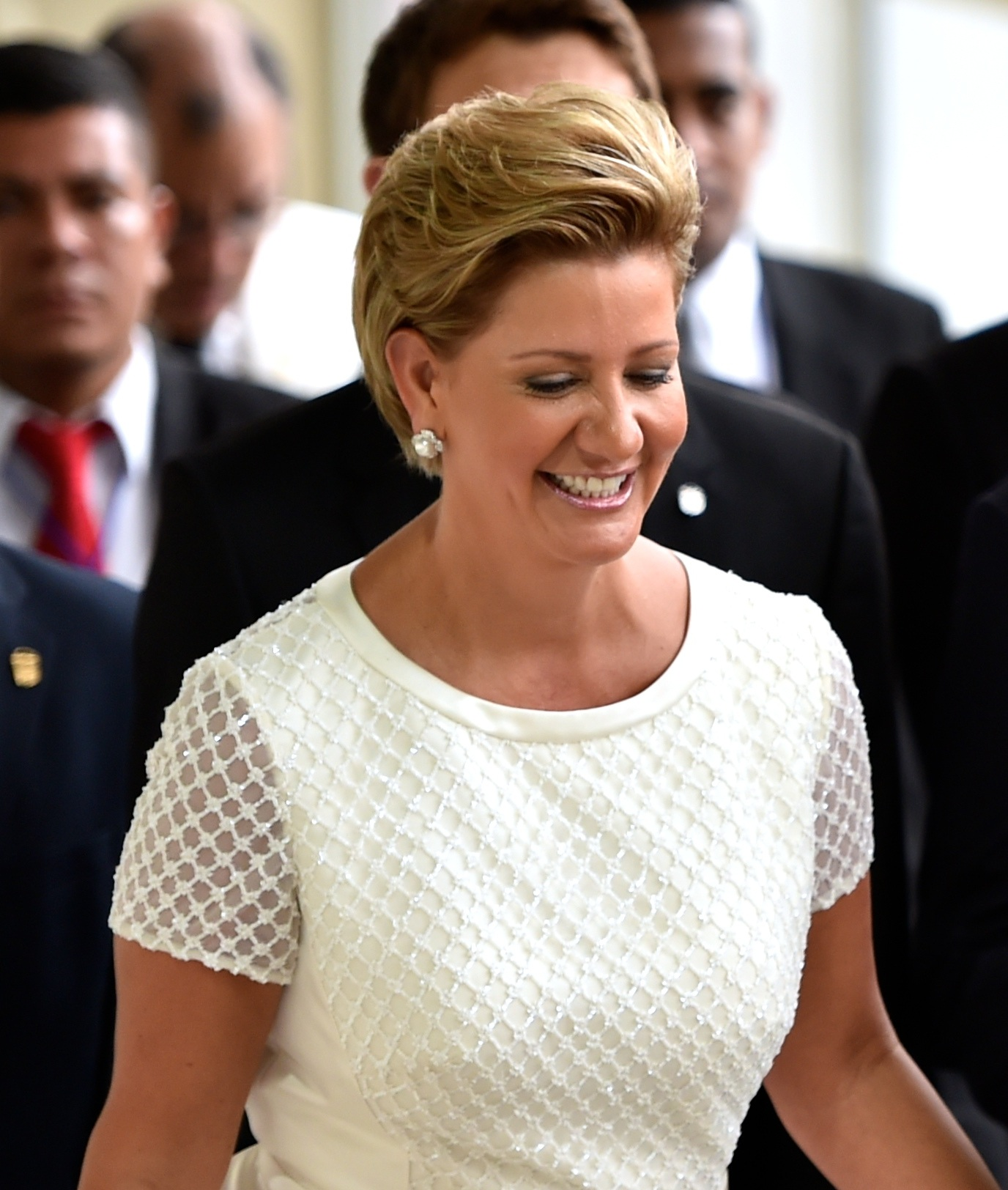

First Lady of Panama
- In role July 1, 2014 – July 1, 2019
- President: Juan Carlos Varela
- Preceded by: Marta Linares de Martinelli
- Succeeded by: Yazmín Colón de Cortizo

Personal details
- Born: July 31, 1968 (age 57) Panama City, Panama
- Party: Panameñista Party
- Spouse: Juan Carlos Varela (m. 1992)
- Profession: Journalist politician

Lorena Castillo García de Varela (born July 31, 1968) is a Panamanian journalist and politician. She has served as the First Lady of Panama since July 1, 2014, to July 1, 2019, during the tenure of her husband, President Juan Carlos Varela.

== Early life ==
Castillo was born on July 31, 1968, in Panama City to parents, Manuel J. Castillo and Moty Garcia. She married Juan Carlos Varela in 1992.

Castillo attended the Flint Hill School in Oakton, Virginia in the United States. She received her bachelor's degree in journalism from the Latin American University of Science and Technology (ULACIT). She worked as a journalist at several organizations, including Telemetro. In 2012, she left journalism to focus on her husband's political career.

== First lady ==
Lorena Castillo became First Lady of Panama on 1 July 2014. On November 16, 2015, Castillo was appointed a "Special Advocate for AIDS in Latin America" by UNAIDS executive director Michel Sidibé during a ceremony at the Palacio de las Garzas.

Honorary titles
Preceded by Marta Linares de Martinelli	First Lady of Panama; 2014–2019	Succeeded by Yazmín Colón de Cortizo
