= Dora Boyd de Pérez Balladares =

Panamanian First Lady

Dora Boyd de Perez Balladares
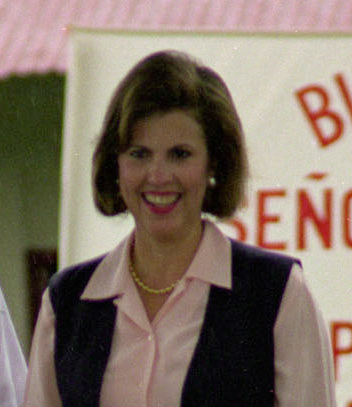
- Dora Boyd in 1997.

First Lady of Panama
- In role September 1, 1994 – September 1, 1999
- Preceded by: Ana Mae Diaz
- Succeeded by: Ruby Moscoso

Personal details
- Born: October 11, 1948 (age 77)
- Spouse: Ernesto Pérez Balladares

Dora Boyd de Perez Balladares (born October 11, 1948) is the wife of Panamanian President Ernesto Pérez Balladares, who held the office 1994-99. During this time, she served as First Lady of Panama.
