= Yazmín Colón de Cortizo =

First Lady of Panama

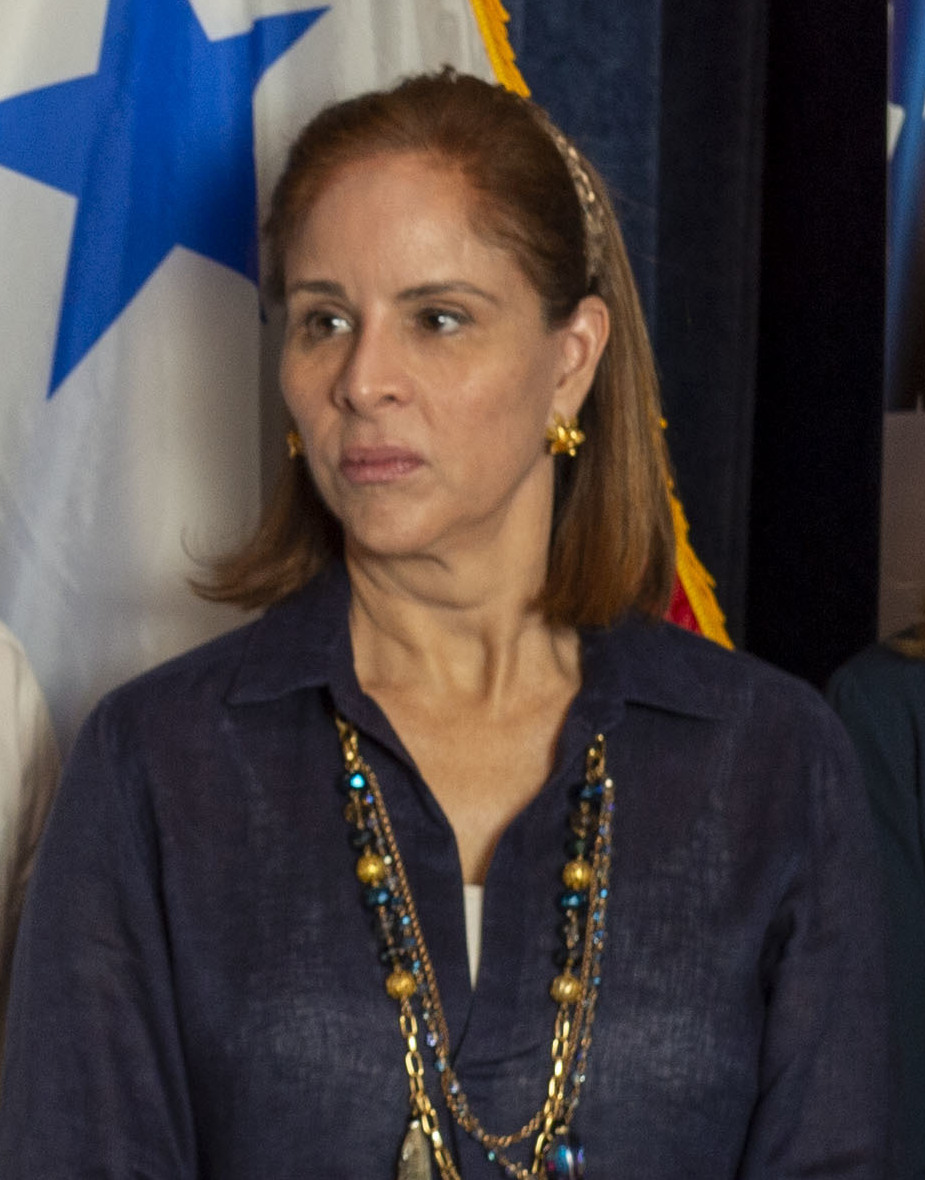
- Yazmin in 2019

First Lady of Panama
- In role July 1, 2019 – July 1, 2024
- President: Laurentino Cortizo
- Preceded by: Lorena Castillo de Varela
- Succeeded by: Marisel Cohen de Mulino

Personal details
- Born: Yazmín Colón Gerena; July 31, 1959 (age 67) San Juan, Puerto Rico
- Spouse: Laurentino Cortizo
- Children: Jorge Andrés & Carolina Esther
- Education: George Washington University

Yazmín Colón de Cortizo (born Yazmín Colón Gerena) is a Puerto Rican businesswoman and politician who became the First Lady of Panama on July 1, 2019, when her husband President Laurentino Cortizo took office. She studied at The George Washington University, obtaining a degree in literature in 1981.

Honorary titles
Preceded by Lorena Castillo	First Lady of Panama; 2019–2024	Incumbent
