= Marta Linares de Martinelli =

First Lady and politician from Panama

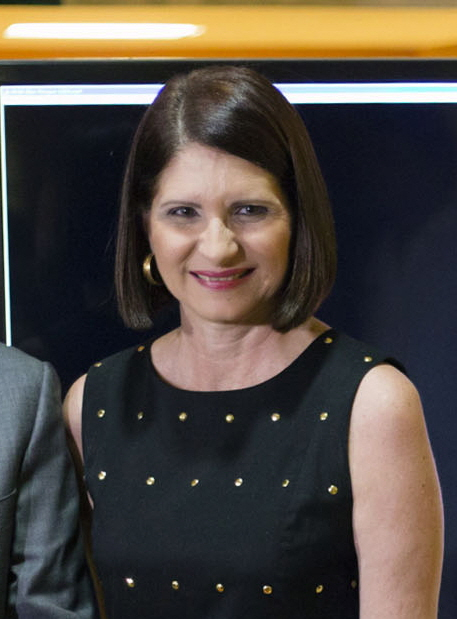

First Lady of Panama
- In role July 1, 2009 – July 1, 2014
- Preceded by: Vivian Fernández
- Succeeded by: Lorena Castillo

Personal details
- Born: Marta Linares; September 2, 1956 (age 69) Panama City, Panama
- Spouse: Ricardo Martinelli
- Children: Ricardo Alberto; Luis Enrique; Carolina Isabel

Marta Linares de Martinelli (née Linares Brin; born December 1, 1956) is a Panamanian insurance broker. She became the First Lady of Panama on July 1, 2009 when her husband, Ricardo Martinelli, became President of Panama.

== Biography ==
Linares was born in Panama City, Panama. She earned a Bachelor's degree in commerce in the United States, at Saint Mary of the Woods College in Indiana. She later studied insurance brokerage at the University of Panama.

In 1978, she married supermarket chain owner Ricardo Martinelli, with whom she had three children: Ricardo Alberto, Luis Enrique, and Carolina Elizabeth.

In 1996, her brother, Carlos Luis Linares, was one of the hostages during the Japanese embassy hostage crisis.

On January 29, 2014, she was chosen to compete for Vice-President of Panama alongside Jose Domingo Arias running for President, but the pair finished in second place.

== Awards and recognition ==
- Italy
  - (Kingdom of the Two Sicilies) Two Sicilian Royal Family: Dame Grand Cross of Merit of the Two Sicilian Royal Sacred Military Constantinian Order of Saint George
- Portugal: Grand Cross of the Order of Merit (29 July 2013)

Honorary titles
Preceded by Vivian Fernández	First Lady of Panama; 2009–2014	Succeeded by Lorena Castillo
