= Ruby Moscoso de Young =

Panamanian First Lady (1941–2022)

First Lady of Panama
- In role September 1, 1999 – September 1, 2004
- Preceded by: Dora Boyd de Perez Balladares
- Succeeded by: Vivian Fernández

Personal details
- Born: 22 September 1941
- Died: 7 January 2022 (aged 80)
- Spouse: Carlos Young Adames

Ruby Moscoso de Young (22 September 1941 – 7 January 2022) was a Panamanian politician who served as First Lady of Panama from 1 September 1999 to 1 September 2004, during the presidential administration of her younger sister Mireya Moscoso.

She was born as Ruby Moscoso in Pedasí, Los Santos, into a family of six children. A graduate of the Justo Arosemena Institute, she married Dr. Carlos Young Adames. From 1990 to 1994, she served as Consul of Panama in Miami in the United States.

Moscoso de Young died on 7 January 2022, at the age of 80.

Honorary titles
Preceded by Dora Boyd de Perez Balladares	First Lady of Panama; 2004–2009	Succeeded by Vivian Fernández
