= Ricardo Arias Calderón =

Panamanian politician

First Vice President of Panama
- In office 20 December 1989 – 17 December 1992
- President: Guillermo Endara
- Preceded by: Carlos Ozores Typaldos
- Succeeded by: Guillermo Ford

Personal details
- Born: 4 May 1933 Panama City, Panama
- Died: 13 February 2017 (aged 83) Panama City, Panama
- Party: Christian Democratic Party of Panama
- Spouse: Teresa
- Children: 4
- Education: Yale, Sorbonne

Ricardo Arias Calderón (May 4, 1933 – February 13, 2017) was a Panamanian politician who served as First Vice President from 1989 to 1992. A Catholic who studied at Yale and the Sorbonne, Arias returned to Panama in the 1960s to work for political reform. He went on to become the president of the Christian Democratic Party of Panama and a leading opponent of the military government of Manuel Noriega. In 1984, he ran as a candidate for Second Vice President on the ticket of three-time former president Arnulfo Arias, but they were defeated by pro-Noriega candidate Nicolás Ardito Barletta.

Following an annulled 1989 election and the US invasion of Panama later in the same year, Arias Calderón was sworn in as the First Vice President of Panama under President Guillermo Endara. After growing tensions in the ruling coalition, Arias resigned his position on December 17, 1992, stating that the government had not done enough to help Panama's people. He continued to be an active voice in Panamanian politics following his resignation, supporting the Panama Canal expansion project and opposing the extradition of Noriega.

== Background ==
Arias' maternal family was from Nicaragua, having left during political upheaval there before his birth. One of Arias' great uncles ran for president in Panama, while another was a supporter of the Nicaraguan revolutionary Sandino, a family history that gave Arias an early interest in politics. His father, an engineer, died when Arias was two years old, and he was raised primarily by his mother, aunt, and grandmother. His mother later remarried to a Panamanian ambassador to the United States.

Arias studied at Culver Military Academy in Indiana in the US. He later majored in English literature at Yale University and philosophy at Paris-Sorbonne University. A Roman Catholic, Arias was heavily influenced by Catholic French philosopher and ethicist Jacques Maritain. Aesthetic, publicly stiff, and accused of aloofness, Arias would later be nicknamed "Arias Cardinal Calderón" during his political career.

== Early political career ==
Arias returned to Panama in the early 1960s to work for political reform, soon joining the small Christian Democratic Party of Panama. In 1972, he left Panama for some time with his family, becoming a dean and later vice president at Florida International University in Miami, Florida in the US. In 1980, however, he declined an offer to become provost, and instead returned to Panamanian politics.

During the rule of military leader Manuel Noriega, Arias was an opposition leader as the president of the Christian Democratic Party of Panama, a member party of the Civic Democratic Opposition Alliance (ADOC). He ran on the ticket of three-time former president Arnulfo Arias (no relation) in the 1984 election as the National Alliance of Opposition's candidate for Second Vice President. Arnulfo Arias was narrowly defeated by Noriega ally Nicolás Ardito Barletta Vallarino, and the opposition stated that the election had been fraudulent.

In February 1988, plainclothes police officers forced Arias Calderón and his wife onto a plane to Costa Rica at gunpoint, and the couple spent a month in exile in Miami. Arias returned to Panama in March, calling openly for Noriega's ouster on arrival at the Omar Torrijos International Airport. In Panama's May 1989 elections, Arias stood as a candidate for First Vice President with the ADOC, with Guillermo Endara as the presidential candidate and Guillermo Ford as the candidate for Second Vice President. However, Noriega's government annulled the election before voting was complete. Days after the completion of voting, Endara, Arias, and Ford were attacked on camera by Noriega supporters while security forces observed and refused to intervene. In October of that year, Arias was briefly arrested for urging citizens not to pay taxes to his government.

== Vice presidency ==
Following Noriega's fall in the December 1989 United States invasion of Panama, Arias was certified as vice president of Panama under President Endara and inaugurated on a US military base.

Arias was put in charge of reforming the Panamanian police forces, putting them under civilian control. He controversially employed former members of Noriega's Panamanian Defense Forces, stating that he trusted them with his own security and that it was "time to look to the future". His defense of former PDF soldiers split supporters of the coalition government, and in May 1990, sparked rumors that he and the CDP were attempting a coup while Endara was out of the country. The presidential offices were occupied by Endara loyalists with submachineguns, who accidentally shot and killed one of Endara's staff members.

In early 1991, the ADOC coalition began to unravel as Endara, Arias, and Ford publicly criticized one another. On April 8, accusing Arias' Christian Democrats of not rallying to his support during an impeachment vote, Endara dismissed Arias from the cabinet.

Arias resigned from the vice presidency on December 17, 1992, stating at a news conference that Endara's government "does not listen to the people, nor does it have the courage to make changes". Endara responded that Arias' resignation was "demagoguery" and "merely starting his 1994 political campaign ahead of time".

== Later activity ==
Arias was an opponent of the post-invasion US presence in Panama before the December 31, 1999 handover of the Panama Canal to the Panama Canal Authority. Arias was criticized in 1998 by Endara's successor, Ernesto Pérez Balladares, as "immoral" for having claimed almost $100,000 in salary from his time as vice president despite having resigned. Arias subsequently challenged Pérez Balladares to a debate over the morality of the latter's plans to amend the constitution and seek a second term.

In 2001, Arias released a book, Democracy without an Army: The Panamanian Experience, arguing that the nation must keep its security forces depoliticized. That same year, he allied with Democratic Revolutionary Party, the former party of Noriega. He later pressed criminal defamation charges against La Prensa cartoonist Julio Briceño for a cartoon of Arias standing besides the Grim Reaper, representing the new alliance. Arias additionally asked for a million dollars in damages, stating "That cartoon made me an accomplice of a crime ... That was a defamation I could not accept or tolerate. I was the one who denounced those crimes at the time of the dictatorship." In 2006, he supported a project to widen the canal, calling it "historical suicide" not to do so.

Arias opposed the 2011 extradition of Noriega from France to Panama, warning that the former dictator could institute a "demagogic populism" similar to that of Venezuela's Hugo Chávez.

== Personal life ==
Arias had a Cuban-born wife, Teresita, whom he married in 1964 and with whom he had four children. In the 1960s, she broke new ground for political spouses by attending political rallies and campaigning actively for her husband. Because Endara was a widower, she also acted as Panama's First Lady until Endara remarried to Ana Mae Diaz Chen in 1990.

In his final years, Arias suffered from Parkinson's disease, which kept him out of the public eye. He died in Panama City on February 14, 2017, aged 83.

Political offices
Preceded by Carlos Ozores Typaldos	First Vice President of Panama; 1989–1992	Succeeded by Guillermo Ford
