= Vivian Fernández =

First Lady of Panama

Vivian Fernández de Torrijos
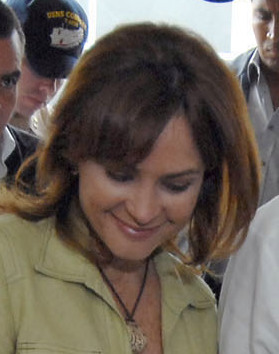

First Lady of Panama
- In role September 1, 2004 – July 1, 2009
- Preceded by: Ruby Moscoso
- Succeeded by: Marta Linares de Martinelli

Personal details
- Born: Vivian Fernández; March 25, 1966 (age 60) Panama City, Panama
- Spouse: Martin Torrijos
- Children: Daniela María, Martín Omar & Nicolás Antonio

Vivian Fernández de Torrijos (born Vivian del Carmen Fernández Bello on March 25, 1966) became the First Lady of Panama on September 1, 2004, when she married President Martín Torrijos, serving in that post until he left office as president on July 1, 2009.

Honorary titles
Preceded by Ruby Moscoso	First Lady of Panama; 2004–2009	Succeeded by Marta Linares de Martinelli
