= Francisco Rodríguez (politician) =

Former President of Panama

President of Panama
- In office 1 September 1989 – 20 December 1989
- Military Leader: Manuel Noriega
- Vice President: First Vice President; Carlos Ozores; Second Vice President; Vacant
- Preceded by: Manuel Solís Palma
- Succeeded by: Guillermo Endara

Personal details
- Born: Francisco Antonio Rodríguez Poveda; 24 November 1938 (age 87) Herrera, Panama
- Party: Democratic Revolutionary Party

Francisco Antonio Rodríguez Poveda (born 24 November 1938) is a Panamanian politician who briefly served as the provisional President of Panama in 1989.

== Early life ==
Rodríguez was born in Herrera Province.

== Provisional President of Panama ==
Rodríguez became provisional President of Panama on 1 September 1989 following the resignation of Manuel Solís Palma. He stood down on 20 December 1989 following the United States invasion of Panama and the arrest of de facto leader Manuel Antonio Noriega. He was one of a series of Noriega's puppet rulers, nicknamed the "Kleenex presidents" in Panama due to their "disposability".

== Later life ==
In 1994, Rodríguez was pardoned by President Guillermo Endara for any crimes committed during the Noriega years. Rodríguez belonged to the Democratic Revolutionary Party (PRD).

== See also ==
- Manuel Noriega § De facto ruler of Panama

Political offices
Preceded by Manuel Solís	President of Panama; September 1989 – December 1989	Succeeded by Guillermo Endara
