= Solidarity Party (Panama) =

Political party in Panama

The Solidarity Party (Partido Solidaridad) was a political party founded in 1993 in Panama that merged with the National Liberal Party (Partido Nacional Liberal) and formed the new Patriotic Union Party.

At the legislative elections, 2 May 2004, the party won 15.7% of the popular vote and 9 out of 78 seats. Guillermo Endara on the same day, at the presidential election, won 30.9% of the vote. Endara subsequently set up his own party, the Moral Vanguard of the Fatherland, to contest the 2009 elections.
