= Dignity Battalions =

Former Panamanian government militia units

- Batallones de la Dignidad
- Other name: "Dingbats"
- Founder: Manuel Noriega
- Leader: Manuel Noriega
- Dates active: April 1988 – February 1990
- Dissolved: February 10, 1990
- Country: Panama
- Allegiance: Noriega's government
- Ideology: Panamanian nationalism
- Status: Disbanded
- Part of: Panama Defense Forces (Auxiliary force)
- Wars: US invasion of Panama

Dignity Battalions (Spanish: Batallones de la Dignidad) were paramilitary militia units created by Panama's de facto ruler Manuel Noriega in April 1988 to augment the Panama Defense Forces in defending Panama against possible invasion by the United States and to suppress domestic political opposition to Noriega's regime. They were dissolved on February 10, 1990, following the United States invasion of Panama which removed Noriega from power.

Approximately 11 battalions were formed with seven more planned for rural areas. They were administered by the Panama Defense Forces through a "Dignity Brigade Staff" made up of selected government employees. Each battalion contained from 25 to 250 male and female volunteers. Battalions often had patriotic names such as the "Christopher Columbus Battalion", the "Saint Michael the Archangel Battalion" and the "Latin Liberation Battalion". Around five battalions were formed in Panama City. Battalions also existed in Rio Hato, Colon and Fort Cimarrón.

== Suppression of demonstrations during the 1989 elections ==
In the Panamanian presidential election of May 7, 1989, Guillermo Endara Galimany, along with vice presidential candidates Ricardo Arias-Calderon and Guillermo "Billy" Ford ran against Manuel Noriega's candidate Carlos Duque. The U.S. government gave $10 million to the Endara campaign. The election results were annulled by the Panamanian government on May 10, due to what Noriega called "foreign interference". However, a tally organized by the anti-Noriega alliance showed Endara beating Noriega's puppet candidate, Carlos Duque, by a nearly 3-to-1 margin. Noriega had planned to declare Duque the winner regardless of the actual results; indeed, his cronies had prepared phony tally sheets to take to the district centers. However, by the time the tally sheets arrived, the opposition's count was already out. Knowing he had been severely defeated, Duque refused to go along with the plan.

Former U.S. President Jimmy Carter, there as an observer, denounced Noriega, saying the election had been "stolen".

Another factor that adversely affected the 1989 electoral process, as reported to the Inter-American Commission on Human Rights, was the predicament of various political leaders who had been forced to leave the country. The Noriega government adopted a practice of detaining and harassing the political opposition, seizing their property and forcing them to leave the country. This prevented a major group from participating in election activities and thus gave the government coalition an advantage. Many journalists and members of the opposition were detained for long periods without being charged.

Amid the outcry, Noriega unleashed his Dignity Battalions to suppress demonstrations. In an image caught on video and played out in news sources around the world, they attacked Billy Ford's car. Ford's bodyguards were shot and killed. Billy Ford attempted to flee as one member of the Dignity Battalions pummeled him repeatedly with a metal pipe. The image of Ford running to safety with his guayabera coated in blood, displayed on the cover of the May 22, 1989, Time magazine, brought worldwide attention to Noriega's regime.

The other two presidential candidates were also severely beaten.

The leader of the battalions, appointed by Noriega, was Benjamin Colamarco, who would become Minister of Public Works under President Martín Torrijos' administration. Members wore red shirts with the name of the organization printed on them.

In a 1989 interview with The New York Times, U.S. general Maxwell R. Thurman said, referring to the Dignity Battalions, "I am looking inward because I have the security responsibility for all Panama therefore I don't want the dingbats blowing their way through the embassy." The nickname also appears in a number of other sources.
