= Moral Vanguard of the Fatherland =

Moral Vanguard of the Fatherland Vanguardia Moral por la Patria
- Leader: Guillermo Endara Galimany
- Founded: 2007
- Dissolved: 2009
- Headquarters: Panama City, Panama
- Colours: yellow, white and blue

Vanguardia Moral de la Patria (English: Moral Vanguard of the Fatherland) was a Panamanian political party led by Guillermo Endara, who had been the first president after the military rule ended in 1989. Endara had been a candidate in the 2004 elections for the Solidarity Party. After that, Endara created this new party, and stood as presidential candidate in 2009.

From 2007 to 2009 the party held a seat of the National Assembly, after the 2009 elections the party could not reach the minimum of votes required to exist and was disbanded. Endara died shortly thereafter.
