= Carlos Afu =

Panamanian politician

- Occupation: politician
- Political party: Democratic Revolutionary Party (PRD) (until 2002)

Carlos Afu is a Panamanian politician who served in the National Assembly.

Originally a member of the Democratic Revolutionary Party (PRD), he was expelled by the party in 2002 after voting to approve President Mireya Moscoso's appointment of former Interior Minister Winston Spadafora to the Supreme Court. Afu was accused by his party of having accepted a bribe from Moscoso's government, while he in turn accused the party of accepting bribes en masse from the San Lorenzo consortium, a construction contractor.

In February 2004, Moscoso appeared at the inauguration of a public works project, where she was photographed dancing with Afu. Electoral officials called for an investigation into her appearance, stating that it showed improper support for Afu's re-election campaign; Moscoso described their accusation as "an abuse of power".
