= Patriotic Union (Panama) =

Political party in Panama

The Patriotic Union (Spanish: Unión Patriótica) was a political party in Panama. The party's president was Guillermo Ford.

It was formed on 5 October 2006 when the National Liberal Party (Partido Nacional Liberal) and the Solidarity Party (Partido Solidaridad) merged.

The party was merged with Democratic Change on 27 March 2011.

== See also ==
- Liberalism worldwide
- List of liberal parties
- Liberalism in Panama
