= Guillermo Ford =

Panamanian politician (1936–2011)

- Ford in 1989

Panamanian Ambassador to the United States
- In office 29 November 1999 – 5 February 2002
- President: Mireya Moscoso
- Preceded by: Eloy Alfaro de Alba
- Succeeded by: Roberto Alfaro Estripeaut

First Vice President of Panama
- In office 17 December 1992 – 1 September 1994
- President: Guillermo Endara
- Preceded by: Ricardo Arias Calderón
- Succeeded by: Tomás Gabriel Altamirano

Second Vice President of Panama
- In office 20 December 1989 – 17 December 1992
- President: Guillermo Endara
- Preceded by: Roderick Esquivel (1988)
- Succeeded by: Felipe Virzi (1994)

Personal details
- Born: 11 November 1936 Panama City, Panama
- Died: 19 March 2011 (aged 74) Panama City, Panama
- Party: MOLIRENA
- Children: 3

Guillermo "Billy" Ford Boyd (11 November 1936 – 19 March 2011) was a Panamanian politician, diplomat, and businessman who was Vice President of Panama from 1989 to 1994, serving as second vice president from 1989 to 1992 and first vice president from 1992 to 1994. He later served as the Panamanian ambassador to the United States from 1999 to 2002.

Ford was one of the running mates of Guillermo Endara in the 1989 Panamanian election. During the campaign, Ford survived an assassination attempt overtly ordered by dictator Manuel Noriega. Following Endara and Ford's suppressed victory, the United States invaded Panama, deposed Noriega, and installed the democratically elected leaders.

== Early life and education ==
Ford was born in Panama City, Panama, on 11 November 1936. He graduated from Balboa High School in the Canal Zone.

== Career ==
=== Opposition leader (1982–1989) ===
A founding member of the Nationalist Republican Liberal Movement (MOLIRENA), Ford was a leading opponent of military dictator Manuel Noriega.

=== 1989 campaign ===
In 1989, Ford joined the ticket of Guillermo Endara and Ricardo Arias Calderón to challenge pro-Noriega candidate Carlos Duque. After the initial vote count showed Endara and Ford's coalition leading Noriega's backed candidate by a 3 to 1 margin, the election results were invalidated by the Noriega regime before counting could be completed.

==== Attempted assassination ====
After a rally in support of Endara and Ford, members of the Dignity Battalions, armed with guns, pipes, and wooden planks, brutally attacked Ford and his entourage. A photo of the assault on Ford by a member of the Dignity Battalions appeared on the cover of Time magazine, Newsweek, and U.S. News. The iconic photo by Ron Haviv (of AFP), of Ford in his white guayabera shirt splattered bright red with blood became one of the most famous images of 1989. The attack was widely described as an "assassination attempt" carried out on the orders of General Noriega. United States president George H. W. Bush referred to the Dignity Battalions as "doberman thugs" in a press conference on 13 May 1989.

=== Vice presidency (1989–1994) ===
Ford was sworn is as Second Vice President of Panama at Fort Clayton on 20 December 1989. The U.S.-orchestrated swearing-in of Endara, Calderón, and Ford, performed by a Panamanian judge, immediately established the triumvirate as Panama's provisional government, with the group remaining at the base for approximately 36 hours amid ongoing combat operations. This intervention-backed appointment transitioned power from Noriega's military dictatorship to civilian rule, with the Endara administration gaining swift U.S. recognition and economic aid for reconstruction.

During the Endara administration, Ford concurrently served as Minister of Planning and Economic Policy. In his dual role as minister, Ford authored the economic reform package aimed at stabilizing Panama's economy, known as the "Ford Plan." Following the resignation of First Vice President Ricardo Arias Calderón in 1992, Ford assumed the role of First Vice President until the end of the term in 1994.

=== Ambassador to the United States (1999–2002) ===
In October 1999, Ford was appointed as Panamanian Ambassador to the United States by President Mireya Moscoso. Sworn into office on 29 November 1999, his tenure coincided with the handover of the Panama Canal on 31 December 1999. He served as ambassador during the administrations of Bill Clinton and George W. Bush before retiring on 5 February 2002.

== Personal life ==
Ford died on 19 March 2011, in his residency in Panama City, and he received a state funeral. The Panamanian National Assembly also honored him with a special resolution.

Political offices
Preceded by Ricardo Arias Calderón	First Vice President of Panama; 1992–1994	Succeeded by Tomas Altamirano Duque
