= Juan Carlos Navarro (politician) =

Panamanian politician (born 1961)

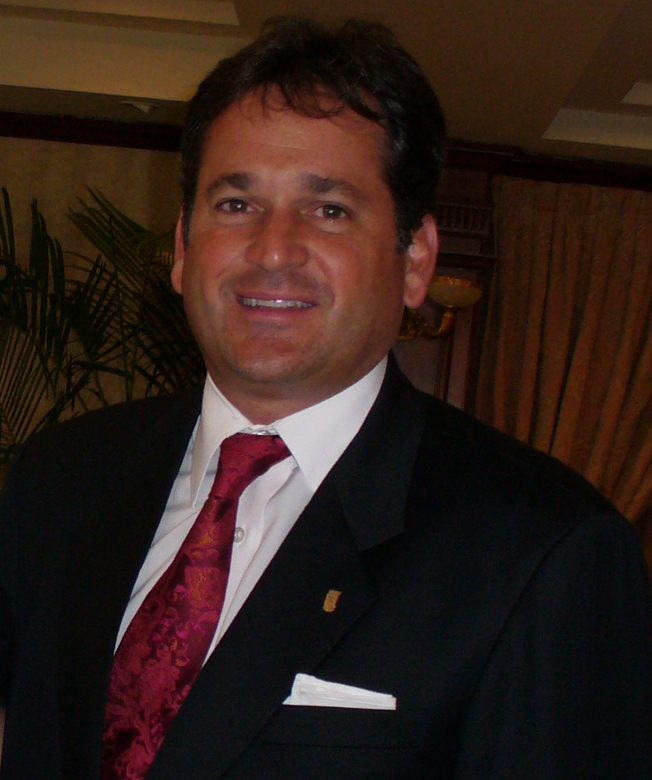

Mayor of Panama City
- In office 1 September 1999 – 1 July 2009
- Preceded by: Mayin Correa
- Succeeded by: Bosco Vallarino

Personal details
- Born: 19 October 1961 (age 64) Panama City, Panama
- Party: Democratic Revolutionary Party
- Spouse: Cuqui Campagnani
- Children: 3
- Education: Harvard University (1983–1985); Dartmouth College (1979–1983); Javier School (1973–1978)
- Occupation: Environmentalism, Businessperson, Politician
- Awards: 100 Latin American Leaders of the New Millennium; Inter-American Conservation Grant; Environmental Ambassador of the Republic of Panama
- Website: juancarlosnavarro.com

Juan Carlos Navarro (born October 19, 1961) is a Panamanian businessman, environmentalist, and politician. He has been the incumbent Minister of the Environment since July 1, 2024. He was the mayor of Panama City, Panama, until August 30, 2004, and reelected for a second term until July 1, 2009.

== Education ==
Juan Carlos Navarro received his B.A. from Dartmouth College (1983) and a Master in Public Policy from Harvard University (1985). Navarro is fluent in Spanish, French and English.

== Career as conservationist ==
Juan Carlos Navarro founded the National Association for the Conservation of Nature (ANCON) in 1985. Navarro served as the first Environmental Ambassador of his country, appointed by the president of Panama to advise key officials, in both the public and private sectors, on national and international environmental policy on an ad honorem basis (1995–2000).

He was elected to the World Conservation Union (IUCN) as Regional Councilor for Latin America in 1990, and was re-elected to that post in 1994, serving as the first Panamanian and the youngest member ever elected to the Council. Selected in 1998 as the first Inter American Conservation Fellow by the Nature Conservancy's Center for Compatible Economic Development, with the support of the MacArthur Foundation, Navarro was the first conservation leader from the Caribbean, Latin America and the Pacific rim to be so honored. In 1998 he authored the book Panama National Parks, which was published in Madrid, Spain, and is the country's first comprehensive text on national parks and nature reserves.

In 2014, Navarro funded Empresa Nacional de Energia Solar, S.A. (NSOLAR), one of the first and biggest solar power companies in Panama. NSOLAR has installed over 140 successful photovoltaic systems so far.

== Career as politician ==
Chris Shepard and Mayor Juan Carlos Navarro.

Juan Carlos Navarro joined the Democratic Revolutionary Party (Partido Revolucionario Democratico, PRD) in 1998 and was originally elected Mayor of Panama City for a five-year term (1999–2004) after winning his party's primaries (October 1998) and the general election in May 1999. He was reelected for a five-year term (2004–2009) in May 2004. He was the youngest citizen ever elected to the mayor's office. He was elected unanimously as the first president of the National Mayor's Association of Panama (2001) and reelected twice for the same position (2003, 2005). Navarro also served as co-president of the Unión de Ciudades Capitales de Iberoamericanas (UCCI) together with Mayor Alvarez del Manzano of Madrid, Spain (2002).

He quickly established himself as a national party leader and in August 2002 was elected to the nine-member National Executive Committee, the PRD's top governing organism. In 2008 he was re-elected into the National Executive Committee as the most voted member. In September 2008, he participated in his party's primaries for president against the then housing minister, Balbina Herrera. He was defeated by 4%, thus losing an election for the first time in his political career. Even though he had lost the primaries, he had almost half the party supporting his candidacy and this led Balbina Herrera to nominate him as vice-presidential candidate in the PRD ticket for the 2009 presidential election. In that election the PRD and Balbina Herrera lost to Ricardo Martinelli and Juan Carlos Varela by a wide margin. This led Juan Carlos Navarro to call for all the National Executive Committee members to resign based on the poor election results. In October 2009, Juan Carlos Navarro resigned his post as First Under Secretary in the National Executive Committee and shortly thereafter all other members resigned, including Balbina Herrera and then Secretary-General Martin Torrijos.

In 2012, Juan Carlos Navarro was elected Secretary-General of the PRD, the top post in the party's structure. The political movement he led won all 10 posts of the National Executive Committee; it was the first time in history that all 10 posts were held by the same party. In March 2013 he participated once again in his party's primaries for president against 17 other candidates and won with over 95% of the vote. In the 2014 presidential elections, he came third with 28% of the vote.

Even though Navarro lost the election, the party won a majority of seats in the Legislative Assembly. For this reason, after the election Navarro negotiated a legislative pact called "Panama Primero" with president-elect Juan Carlos Varela to secure that many of the projects proposed during his campaign would become a reality. These proposals include the Minister for Environmental Issues and a complete decentralization of the government. Once the legislative pact was finalized, Navarro resigned his post as Secretary General of the PRD accepting his responsibility for the election results.

On July 10, 2018, Navarro once again registered to participate in the PRD primaries, which were to be held on September 16 of the same year. He aspired to be chosen as his party's presidential candidate for the general elections to be held on May 5, 2019.

Navarro announced on August 21, 2018, that he was declining his aspirations to be chosen as the PRD's presidential candidate to back Ernesto Pérez Balladares in his bid to be the party's nominee. In the September 16th primaries, the Balladares-Navarro allegiance came in third place, obtaining 8% of the vote. Laurentino Cortizo won the PRD's presidential nomination.

The publication Forbes featured Navarro in a three-part series it did on the country of Panama in October 2024. The first of the series is called "Panama is Paradise for Rainforest, Wildlife and Potential Partners." In the story, Navarro said, "The only way to stop climate change is to involve the private and philanthropic sectors to deploy clean energy, electric mobility, conservation, and protection initiatives in Panama. There are tons of investments that private companies can make to generate financial returns.”

== Personal life ==
Semester at Sea 2007 and Juan Carlos Navarro.

Juan Carlos Navarro is married to Cuqui Campagnani and they have three children together: Juan Andres, Felipe and Gabriel.

== Books ==
- National Parks of Panama (in Spanish) (1998) ISBN 9962-8805-0-5
- Voices of My Life (in Spanish) (2014) ISBN 978-9962-05-647-8
