= Guillermo Endara =

President of Panama from 1989 to 1994

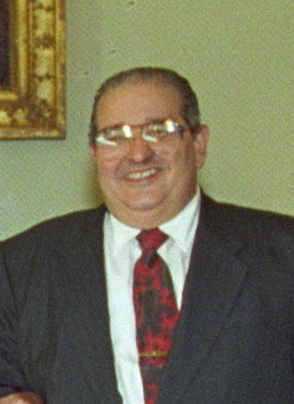
- Endara in 1993

32nd President of Panama
- In office 20 December 1989 – 31 August 1994
- Vice President: First Vice President; Ricardo Arias; Second Vice President; Guillermo Ford
- Preceded by: Francisco Rodríguez; Manuel Noriega (as Military Leader of Panama)
- Succeeded by: Ernesto Pérez Balladares

Personal details
- Born: Guillermo David Endara Galimany; May 12, 1936 Panama City, Panama
- Died: September 28, 2009 (aged 73) Panama City, Panama
- Party: Panameñista; Moral Vanguard of the Fatherland
- Spouses: Marcela Cambra Navarro (m. 1961; died 1989) Ana Mae Díaz (m. 1990)
- Children: 1
- Education: University of Panama; New York University

Guillermo David Endara Galimany (Note: Spanish pronunciation: [giˈʝeɾmo ðaˈβið enˈdaɾa ɣaliˈmani]) (May 12, 1936 – September 28, 2009) was a Panamanian politician who served as the president of Panama from 1989 to 1994.

Raised in a family allied to Panameñista Party founder Arnulfo Arias, Endara attended school in exile in the United States and Argentina following Arias's removal from power in 1941. Endara later received a law degree in Panama and subsequently served as a member of Panama's National Assembly, and briefly as a government minister before heading into exile again following Arias' third overthrow in 1968.

After Arias' death in 1988, Endara became a leading opponent of the Manuel Noriega military dictatorship, heading the opposition coalition in the 1989 presidential election. Though his coalition was judged by international observers as having defeated pro-Noriega candidate Carlos Duque, the results were annulled by the government, and Endara and his running mates were attacked in the streets by the paramilitary Dignity Battalions. The assaults received widespread coverage in international media, helping to build support within the U.S. for military action against Noriega. Seven months later, the United States invaded Panama. Endara was sworn in as the new president on the first night of the invasion on a U.S. military base.

During his presidency, Endara abolished the Panamanian military and replaced it with a national police force. Endara's term saw steady economic growth and a return of democratic institutions, but also high unemployment rates. His administration was marked by internal fighting, and his popularity plummeted. He was succeeded by opposition candidate Ernesto Pérez Balladares in 1994.

Endara ran for office again in 2004 and 2009, but lost to Democratic Revolutionary Party candidate Martín Torrijos and to independent candidate Ricardo Martinelli. He died of a heart attack in September 2009, several months after his last campaign.

== Early life and career ==
Endara was born in 1936 in Panama City, Panama. His father, Guillermo Endara Paniza, was an ally of Authentic Panameñista Party founder Arnulfo Arias, and the family went into exile after Arias was overthrown in a 1941 coup. Endara went to school in Argentina and to Black-Foxe Military Institute in Los Angeles in the United States, where he was described as being a "brilliant student". He later attended the University of Panama Law School, where he graduated first in his class, and New York University.

He returned to Panama in 1963 to practice law, and specialized in labor law. He co-founded the firm of Solis, Endara, Delgado and Guevara, one of Panama's most successful law firms. He won his first public office in 1964 but declined to take it due to evidence of voter fraud in the election.

Endara later served two terms in the National Assembly. In 1968, Endara served as minister of planning and economic policy during Arias's very brief third term as president. When Arias was overthrown again in October 1968, Endara went underground, was jailed briefly in 1971, and joined Arias in exile until 1977. Endara remained politically engaged and when Arias died in 1988, Endara became a leading opposition figure.

== Opposition to Noriega ==
In the presidential election of 1989, Endara ran as the candidate of the Democratic Alliance of Civic Opposition (ADOC), a coalition of parties opposed to military ruler Manuel Noriega. His rival was Carlos Duque, a candidate selected by Noriega. The US government contributed $10 million to Panamanian opposition campaigns, though it was unknown whether Endara received any of this money.

To safeguard against planned vote-rigging by Noriega, ADOC organized a count of results from the country's election precincts before they were sent to the district centers. It showed Endara trouncing Duque by a nearly 3-to-1 margin. Noriega's cronies took phony tally sheets to the district centers, but by this time the opposition's count was already out. International observers led by former US President Jimmy Carter and a separate group of observers appointed by US President George H. W. Bush also agreed that Endara had won a decisive victory. Noriega had planned to declare Duque the winner regardless of the actual results, but Duque knew he'd been routed and refused to go along. Regardless, Noriega annulled the results before counting was complete due to "foreign interference."

The next day, Endara and his running mates, Ricardo Arias Calderón and Guillermo Ford, led a contingent of a thousand supporters to protest the annulment of the elections and urge that the ADOC candidates be recognized as the winners. The protest was attacked by a detachment of Dignity Battalions, a paramilitary group supporting Noriega, and the three candidates were badly beaten. Endara was struck with an iron club, leaving a gash on his head. He was briefly hospitalized and received eight stitches. Images of the attacks on Endara and Ford were carried by media around the world, and were credited with building public support in the US for the invasion that would soon follow.

== Presidency (1989–1994) ==
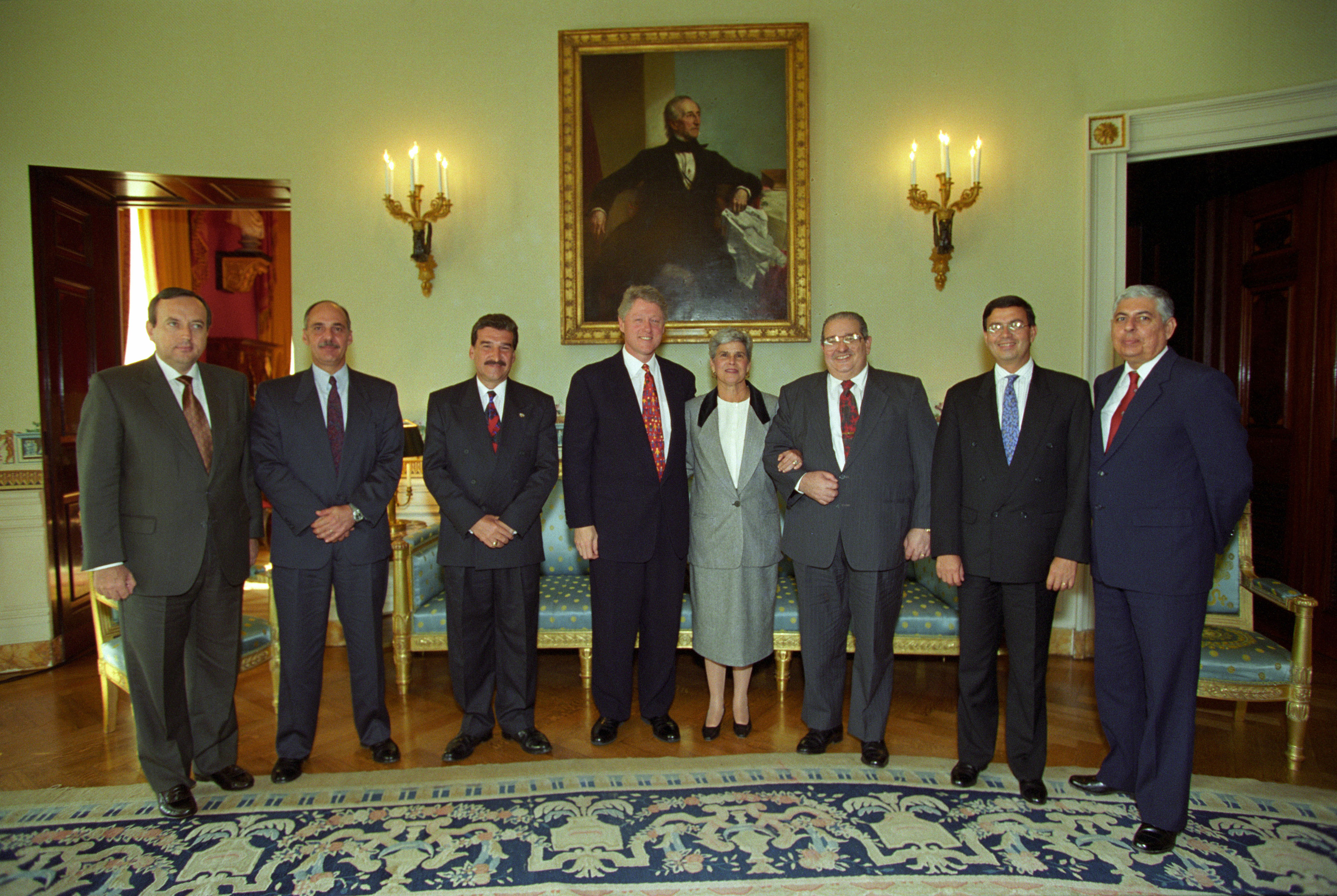
U.S. President Bill Clinton with the Central American leaders in the White House, 1993. Endara is the third from the right, arm in arm with Nicaraguan President Violeta Chamorro.

The US armed forces overthrew Noriega's government during the US invasion of Panama in December 1989. Endara had by this time taken refuge in the military bases under US control. American officials told Endara that if he did not accept the presidency, the only alternative would be an undisguised American occupation. Though Endara had opposed US military action during his campaign, he accepted the presidency, stating later that, "morally, patriotically, civically I had no other choice". He was certified the winner of the election and inaugurated at Fort Clayton, a United States military base, on December 20, 1989. Arias was inaugurated as first vice president, and Ford as second vice president.

Seen as a restorer of democracy, Endara was later noted for having defended freedom of speech and democratic institutions. He also oversaw a reform of the Panamanian Defense Forces, purging Noriega loyalists, asserting the primacy of the civilian government, and returning the group from military to a national police force. In October 1994, the National Assembly passed an amendment abolishing the military at Endara's urging, becoming the second Latin American country to do so.

In early 1991, the ADOC coalition began to unravel as Endara, Arias, and Ford publicly criticized one another. On April 8, accusing Arias's Christian Democratic Party of not rallying to his support during an impeachment vote, Endara dismissed Arias from the cabinet. Arias resigned from the vice presidency on December 17, 1992, stating at a news conference that Endara's government "does not listen to the people, nor does it have the courage to make changes". Endara responded that Arias's resignation was "demagoguery" and "merely starting his 1994 political campaign ahead of time".

Endara's term in office saw marked economic recovery from the nation's years of military rule. During his presidency, Panama had an average annual economic growth of 8%. However, unemployment also rose near 19%. In February 1990, the overweight Endara began a hunger strike in the Metropolitan Cathedral to call attention to the nation's poverty and to pressure US President George H. W. Bush to dispense previously pledged American aid. In the course of the strike, he lost more than 14 kilograms (30 lb) of his 120 kilograms (260 lb).

By May 1992, Endara's public approval rating had fallen from its initial 70% to only 10%. The Associated Press later described Endara's administration as being "tarnished by scandal". Among other financial scandals, Endara's wife Ana Mae Diaz was accused of reselling food that had been donated by Italy on the streets of Panama City. In 1992, Diaz won $125,000 in the national lottery and indicated that she intended to keep the money rather than donating it; the incident was also cited as an example of the Endara's administration's lack of concern for Panama's poor.

== Later career ==
In 2004, Endara broke with the Arnulfista party over differences of opinion with the party's leader, Panamanian president Mireya Moscoso, and accused the party of corruption. He ran in the 2004 presidential election as the candidate of the Solidarity Party, on a platform of reducing crime and government corruption. His primary rival was Democratic Revolutionary Party (PRD) candidate Martín Torrijos, son of the former military dictator Omar Torrijos. Martín Torrijos ran on a platform of strengthening democracy and negotiating a free trade agreement with the US, and was supported by popular musician and politician Ruben Blades. Endara finished second, receiving 31% of the vote to Torrijos' 47%.

He later founded his own political party, the Moral Vanguard of the Fatherland, and in 2009 was again a candidate for the Panamanian general elections. Ricardo Martinelli of the Democratic Change party won the election with 61% of the vote, while PRD candidate Balbina Herrera won 37%. Endara placed a distant third, with 2% of the vote.

Just a few months later, on September 28, 2009, Endara died at the age of 73 in his apartment in Panama City, of a heart attack while preparing dinner. He was given a state funeral on September 30 attended by President Martinelli as well as former presidents Perez Balladares, Moscoso, and Torrijos.

== Personal life ==
Endara married his first wife Marcela, in 1961; the couple had one daughter, Marcelita, and three grandchildren, Javier, Marcela Victoria and Jacob. Marcela died of a heart attack in 1989 while Endara was hospitalized from the attack by the Dignity Brigades. He remarried on June 11, 1990, at the age of 54, to Ana Mae Diaz Chen, a 22-year-old law student of Chinese origin. Endara was reportedly so happy in the marriage that he would even leave cabinet meetings for "a quick cuddle". The marriage received widespread coverage and mockery in the Panamanian press, including a new nickname for Endara, El Gordo Feliz ("Happy Fatty").

== Bibliography ==
- Harding, Robert C. (2006). The History of Panama. Greenwood Press. ISBN 031333322X.

Political offices
Preceded by Francisco Rodríguez	President of Panama; 1989–1994	Succeeded by Ernesto Pérez Balladares
