= Martín Torrijos =

35th president of Panama (2004–2009)

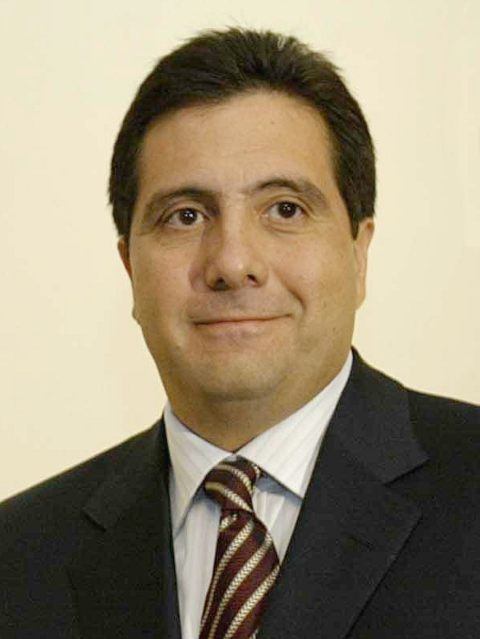
- Official portrait, 2004

35th President of Panama
- In office 1 September 2004 – 1 July 2009
- Vice President: First Vice President; Samuel Lewis Navarro; Second Vice President; Rubén Arosemena
- Preceded by: Mireya Moscoso
- Succeeded by: Ricardo Martinelli

Personal details
- Born: Martín Erasto Torrijos Espino; July 18, 1963 (age 63) Chitré, Panama
- Party: Democratic Revolutionary Party
- Spouse: Vivian Fernández
- Parent: Omar Torrijos (father)
- Education: Texas A&M University
- Occupation: Economist, politician

Martín Erasto Torrijos Espino (Spanish pronunciation: [maɾˈtin toˈrixos]; born July 18, 1963) is a Panamanian politician who was President of Panama from 2004 to 2009.

He was fathered out of wedlock by Panamanian military ruler Omar Torrijos, the de facto head of Panama from 1968 to 1981. Martín Torrijos was educated in economics and political science in the United States. He then returned to Panama, becoming active in the Democratic Revolutionary Party (PRD). He was the party's presidential candidate in the 1999 general election, losing to Arnulfista Party candidate Mireya Moscoso.

In the 2004 presidential election, he ran again as the PRD candidate. This time, his primary rival was Solidarity Party candidate Guillermo Endara, whom Torrijos defeated 47% to 31%. Torrijos reformed social security and pensions during his term in office, as well as proposing and passing a $5 billion expansion of the Panama Canal. Torrijos was succeeded by supermarket magnate Ricardo Martinelli in 2009. He is a member of the Inter-American Dialogue.

In the 2024 general elections, he was the presidential candidate for the Christian democratic People's Party, one of the parties that supported him and formed part of his government.

== Early life and career ==
Martín Torrijos is the son of military ruler Omar Torrijos, who was Panama's social reformer and military strongman from 1968 until his death in a 1981 plane crash. The younger Torrijos is an illegitimate child primarily raised by his mother, but his father publicly acknowledged him when he became a teenager. Born in Chitré, Herrera, he graduated from St. John's Northwestern Military Academy located in Delafield, Wisconsin, in the United States and studied political science and economics at Texas A&M University in College Station, Texas. During his time in the US, he also worked in Chicago, managing a McDonald's restaurant.

During the presidency of Ernesto Pérez Balladares (1994–1999), Torrijos served as deputy minister for the interior and justice. His most significant act as deputy minister was to sign into law the complete privatization of Panama's water utilities. When the new law proved unpopular, the Democratic Revolutionary Party (PRD) effected a reversion to the previous system. During his term in office the rate of armed robberies and assault increased. There were several reported cases where SUNTRACS, a workers union, was angered, causing several riots which involved rock flinging.

== Presidential campaigns ==
After the failure of a constitutional referendum that would have allowed PRD incumbent Ernesto Pérez Balladares to seek a second consecutive term, Torrijos was named to represent the PRD in the 1999 general election. Torrijos was selected in part to try to win back left-leaning voters after the privatizations and union restrictions instituted by Pérez Balladares. His main opponent was Arnulfista Party candidate Mireya Moscoso, widow of former Panamanian president Arnulfo Arias, who had been deposed in the military coup that had brought Torrijos's father Omar to power. Moscoso ran on a populist platform, beginning many of her speeches with the Latin phrase "Vox populi, vox Dei" ("the voice of the people is the voice of God"), previously used by Arias to begin his own speeches. She pledged to support education, reduce poverty, and slow the pace of privatization. While Torrijos ran in large part on his father's memory—including using the campaign slogan "Omar lives"—Moscoso evoked that of her dead husband, leading Panamanians to joke that the election was a race between "two corpses". Torrijos and the PRD were ultimately hampered by the corruption scandals of the previous administration, as well as a scandal in which La Prensa reported that two members of his campaign had been bribed by Mobil to sell a former US military base. Moscoso defeated Torrijos with 45% of the vote to 37%.

Torrijos ran again in the 2004 presidential election on a platform of strengthening democracy and negotiating a free trade agreement with the US, and was supported by popular musician and politician Rubén Blades; Torrijos later made Blades the nation's tourism minister. Torrijos' primary rival was Guillermo Endara, who had served as president from 1990 to 1994. Endara ran as the candidate of the Solidarity Party, on a platform of reducing crime and government corruption. Endara and the other candidates also ran a series of negative ads highlighting the PRD's connections with former military ruler Manuel Noriega. Endara finished second in the race, receiving 31% of the vote to Torrijos' 47%.

Shortly before leaving office, Moscoso sparked controversy by pardoning four men—Luis Posada Carriles, Gaspar Jiménez, Pedro Remon and Guillermo Novo Sampol—who had been convicted of plotting to assassinate Cuban president Fidel Castro during a 2000 visit to Panama. Cuba broke off diplomatic relations with the country, and Venezuelan president Hugo Chávez recalled the nation's ambassador. Moscoso stated that the pardons had been motivated by her mistrust of Torrijos, saying, "I knew that if these men stayed here, they would be extradited to Cuba and Venezuela, and there they were surely going to kill them there."

== Presidency (2004–2009) ==
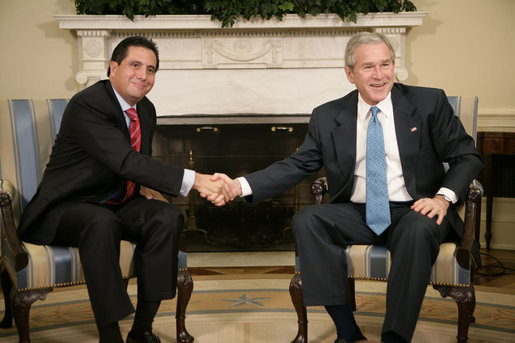
Martín Torrijos and George W. Bush in the Oval Office, February 16, 2007

In May 2005, the Torrijos government proposed increasing pension contributions and raising the retirement age to help pay off the nation's increasing foreign debt. The changes triggered several weeks of protests, strikes, and a student-led closure of the University of Panama, and the proposal to increase the retirement age was postponed. Following opposition from the Roman Catholic Church and union leaders, Torrijos also initially postponed plans to reform social security, though he successfully passed a reform measure later in his term.

Torrijos's temporary unpopularity forced him also postpone plans for widening the Panama Canal until 2006. In April of that year, he presented a plan, calling it "probably the most important decision of this generation". The expansion was projected to double the canal's shipping capacity and allow it to handle oil tankers and cruise ships, at a projected cost of $5 billion. The plan was approved by public referendum on October 22 of that year with 78% of the vote.

In November 2006, Torrijos sponsored the Latin American and Caribbean Congress in Solidarity with Puerto Rico's Independence in favor of Puerto Rico's independence and made an energetic call to the United States to recognise the independence of Puerto Rico. His administration opposed Colombian president Alvaro Uribe's proposals to build a road through the undeveloped Darién Gap connecting the countries, stating that it could damage ecotourism in the region.

In 2007, Torrijos negotiated the Panama–United States Trade Promotion Agreement with the administration of George W. Bush. Though ratified in Panama and apparently headed to ratification in the US, the agreement was derailed in September 2007 when fellow PRD member Pedro Miguel González Pinzón was elected President of the National Assembly. González Pinzón had been indicted by a US grand jury for the 1992 murder of US Army Sgt. Zak Hernández, and some members of the US Congress vowed to oppose the pact until González Pinzón no longer held the post. Unwilling to publicly battle his party's nationalist wing, Torrijos privately asked González Pinzón to resign, but avoided criticizing him in the press. The deal was finally ratified under Torrijos's successor, Ricardo Martinelli.

Torrijos was again popular by the end of his term, but because Panama's constitution forbids consecutive second terms for the presidency, the PRD nominated Balbina Herrera as a candidate to succeed him in 2009. She lost to an independent candidate, Ricardo Martinelli, the owner of a supermarket chain.

== Foreign honours ==
- Cuba:
  - Order of José Martí
- Dominican Republic:
  - Order of Merit of Duarte, Sánchez and Mella
- Mexico:
  - Order of the Aztec Eagle
- Spain:
  - Collar of the Order of Isabella the Catholic
- Uruguay:
  - Medal of the Oriental Republic of Uruguay

== Bibliography ==
- Harding, Robert C. (2006). The History of Panama. Greenwood Press. ISBN 031333322X.

Political offices
Preceded by Mireya Moscoso	President of Panama; 2004–2009	Succeeded by Ricardo Martinelli
