= List of state leaders in the 20th century (1901–1950) =

This is a list of state leaders in the 20th century (1901–1950) AD, such as the heads of state, heads of government, and the general secretaries of single-party states.

These polities are generally sovereign states, but excludes minor dependent territories, whose leaders can be found listed under territorial governors in the 20th century. For completeness, these lists can include colonies, protectorates, or other dependent territories that have since gained sovereignty.

Leaders of constituent states within the British South Asia, are excluded, and found on this list of state leaders in 20th-century British South Asia.

== Africa ==
=== Africa: Central ===
Angola

- Kasanje Kingdom (complete list) –

- Ngwangwa, King (1911–1912)

- Kingdom of Kongo (complete list) –

vassal to Portugal: 1888–1914
- Henrique IV, King (1896–1901)
- Pedro VI, King (1901–1910)
- Manuel Nkomba, King (1910–1911)
- Manuel III, King (1911–1914)

- Portuguese Angola, (complete list) –

Colony, 1575–1951
For details see the Kingdom of Portugal under Southwest Europe

Cameroon

- Fondom of Bafut (complete list) –

- Abumbi I, King (1852–1932)
- Achirimbi II, King (1932–1961, joined Cameroon)

- Duala people (complete list) –

- Dika a Mpondo, King, Paramount Chief (pre-1879–c.1905)
- Manga Ndumbe Bell, King Paramount Chief (c.1897–?)
- Rudolf Duala Manga Bell, King, Paramount Chief (c.1908–1913)

- Kamerun (complete list) –

German colony, 1884–1916
For details see the German Empire under central Europe

- French Cameroons, part of French Equatorial Africa (complete list) –

League of Nations mandate, 1918–1946; United Nations trust territory, 1946–1960
For details see France under western Europe

- British Cameroons part of British West Africa (complete list) –

League of Nations mandate, 1922–1946; United Nations trust territory, 1946–1961
For details see the United Kingdom under British Isles, Europe

Central African Republic

- Ubangi-Shari part of French Equatorial Africa (complete list) –

French colony, 1903–1958
For details see France under western Europe

Chad

- Sultanate of Bagirmi (complete list) –

- Gaourang II, Mbang (1885–1918)
vassal to France: from 1912
- Mahamat Abdelkader, Mbang (1918–1935)

- Wadai Empire (complete list) –

- Ahmad Abu al-Ghazali ibn 'Ali, Kolak (1900–1901)
- Dud Murra, Kolak (1901–1909)
- 'Asil, Kolak (1909–1912)

- French Chad, part of French Equatorial Africa (complete list) –

Colony, 1900–1960
For details see France under western Europe

Congo: Belgian

- Congo Free State

- Sovereign –

- Leopold II of Belgium, Sovereign (1885–1908)

- Governors general (complete list) –

- Théophile Wahis, Governor general (1892–1908)

- Belgian Congo (complete list) –

Colony, 1908–1960
For details see the Belgium under Western Europe

Congo: French

- French Congo part of French Equatorial Africa (complete list) –

Colony, 1882–1910
For details see France under western Europe

- French Equatorial Africa (complete list) –

Federation of colonies, 1910–1934; Colony, 1934–1958
For details see France under western Europe

Equatorial Guinea

- Spanish Guinea (complete list) –

Colony, 1778–1968
For details see Spain in southwest Europe

Gabon

- Kingdom of Orungu (complete list) –

- Rogombé-Nwèntchandi, Agamwinboni (?–1927)

- French Gabon, part of French Equatorial Africa (complete list) –

Colony, 1882–1910
For details see France under western Europe

São Tomé and Príncipe

- Portuguese São Tomé and Príncipe (complete list) –

Colony, 1470–1951
For details see the Kingdom of Portugal under Southwest Europe

=== Africa: East ===
Great Lakes area

Burundi

- Kingdom of Burundi (complete list) –

- Mwezi IV, King (c.1850–1908)
- Mutaga IV, King (1908–1915)
- Mwambutsa IV, King (1915–1966)
- Ntare V Ndizeye, King (1966)

- Ruanda-Urundi (complete list) –

League of Nations mandate of Belgium, 1922–1946; United Nations trust territory, 1946–1962
For details see Belgium under western Europe

Kenya

- Wituland (complete list) –

- Fumo 'Umar ibn Ahmad, Mfalume (1891–1893, 1895–1923)

- East Africa Protectorate (complete list) –

British protectorate, 1895–1920

- Kenya Colony (complete list) –

British colony and protectorate, 1920–1963
For details see the United Kingdom under British Isles, Europe

Rwanda

- Kingdom of Rwanda (complete list) –

- Yuhi V Musinga, King (1896–1931)
- Mutara III Rudahigwa, King (1931–1959)
- Kigeli V Ndahindurwa, King (1959–1961)

Tanzania

- Sultanate of Zanzibar (complete list) –

- Hamoud, Sultan (1896–1902)
- Ali II, Sultan (1902–1911)
- Khalifa II, Sultan (1911–1960)
- Abdullah, Sultan (1960–1963)
- Jamshid, Sultan (1963–1964)

- German East Africa (complete list) –

Colony, 1885–1919
For details see the German Empire under central Europe

- Tanganyika under Britain (complete list) –

League of Nations mandate of Britain, 1922–1946; United Nations trust territory, 1946–1961
For details see the United Kingdom under British Isles, Europe

Uganda

- Ankole (complete list) –

- Kahaya II, Omugabe (1895–1944)
- Gasyonga II, Omugabe (1944–1967)

- Buganda (complete list) –

- Daudi Chwa II, Kabaka (1897–1939)
- Muteesa II, Kabaka (1939–1969)

- Bunyoro (complete list) –

- Kitahimbwa, Omukama (1898–1902)
- Duhaga III, Omukama (1902–1924)
- Winyi IV, Omukama (1925–1967)

- Uganda Protectorate (complete list) –

British protectorate, 1894–1962
For details see the United Kingdom under British Isles, Europe

Horn of Africa area

Djibouti

- French Somaliland (complete list) –

Colony, 1896–1946; Overseas territory, 1946–1967
For details see France under western Europe

Eritrea

- Italian Eritrea (complete list) –

Colony, 1890–1936
For details see Italy under southcentral Europe

Ethiopia

- Ethiopian Empire (complete list) –

- Menelik II, Emperor (1889–1913)
- Iyasu V, Emperor (1913–1916)
- Zewditu I, Empress (1916–1930)
- Haile Selassie I, Emperor (1930–1974)

- Italian East Africa (complete list) –

Colony, 1936–1941
For details see Italy under southcentral Europe

- Sultanate of Aussa (complete list) –

- Mahammad ibn Hanfere, Amoyta (1862–1902)
- Mahammad ibn Aydahis ibn Hanfere, Amoyta (1902–c.1910)
- Yayyo ibn Mahammad ibn Hanfere, Amoyta (c.1902–1927)
- Mahammad Yayyo, Amoyta (1927–1944)

- Kingdom of Gumma (complete list) –

- Firisa, Moti (1899–1902)

- Kingdom of Jimma (complete list) –

- Abba Jifar II, Moti (1878–1932)
- Abba Jofir, Moti (1932)

- Leqa Neqemte (complete list) –

- Kumsa Mereda, Moti (1888–1923)

Somalia

- Dervish state –

- Diiriye Guure, sultan (1895–1920)
- Mohammed Abdullah, emir (1895–1920)

- Sultanate of the Geledi (complete list) –

- Osman Ahmed, Sultan (1878–1911)

- Sultanate of Hobyo –

- Yusuf Ali Kenadid, Sultan (1870s–early 20th century)
- Ali Yusuf Kenadid, Sultan (early 20th century–1926)

- Majeerteen Sultanate (complete list) –

- Osman Mahamuud, King (1860–c.1924)

- Italian Somaliland part of Italian East Africa (complete list) –

Colony, 1890–1936
For details see Italy under southcentral Europe
British Occupied territory, 1941–1949
For details see the United Kingdom under British Isles, Europe

- British Somaliland (complete list) –

Protectorate, 1884–1940, 1941–1960
For details see the United Kingdom under British Isles, Europe

- Trust Territory of Somaliland (complete list) –

United Nations trust territory of Italy, 1950–1960
For details see Italy under southcentral Europe

Indian Ocean

Comoros

- Sultanate of Mwali (complete list) –

- Salima Machamba bint Saidi Hamadi Makadara Queen/Sultan (1888–1909)

- Sultanate of Ndzuwani (complete list) –

- Saidi Mohamed bin Saidi Omar, Sultan (1892–1912)

- French Comoros (complete list) –

Annexed by France, 1841–1843; Colony attached to Mayotte, 1843–1914; Colony attached to French Madagascar, 1914–1946

- Territory of the Comoros (complete list) –

French overseas territory, 1946–1961; French autonomous territory, 1961–1975
For details see France under western Europe

Madagascar

- French Madagascar (complete list) –

Colony, 1897–1958
For details see France under western Europe

Mauritius

- British Mauritius (complete list) –

Colony, 1810–1968
For details see the United Kingdom under British Isles, Europe

Seychelles

- Colony of Seychelles (1903–1976)

Part of British Mauritius, 1811–1903; British colony, 1903–1976
For details see the United Kingdom under British Isles, Europe

=== Africa: Northcentral ===
Libya

- Italian Libya (complete list) –

Protectorate, 1912–1934; Colony, 1934–1943
For details see Italy under southcentral Europe

- Tripolitanian Republic –

- Ahmad Tahir al-Murayyid, Chairman (1918–1923)

- Allied administration of Libya (UK & France) –

Allied military administration, 1942–1951

- Cyrenaica Emirate (complete list) –

- Idris, Emir (1949–1951), King (1951–1969)

Tunisia

- Beylik of Tunis

- Beys (complete list) –

- Ali III ibn al-Husayn, Bey (1882–1902)
- Muhammad IV al-Hadi, Bey (1902–1906)
- Muhammad V an-Nasir, Bey (1906–1922)
- Muhammad VI al-Habib, Bey (1922–1929)
- Ahmad II ibn Ali, Bey (1929–1942)
- Muhammad VII al-Munsif, Bey (1942–1943)
- Muhammad VIII al-Amin, Bey (1943–1956)

- Grand viziers (complete list) –

- Aziz Bouattour, Grand vizier (1882–1907)
- M'hamed Djellouli, Grand vizier (1907–1908)
- Youssef Djait, Grand vizier (1908–1915)
- Taïeb Djellouli, Grand vizier (1915–1922)
- Mustapha Dinguizli, Prime minister (1922–1926)
- Khelil Bouhageb, Prime minister (1926–1932)
- Hédi Lakhoua, Prime minister (1932–1942)
- Mohamed Chenik, Prime minister (1943)
- Slaheddine Baccouche, Prime minister (1943–1947)
- Mustapha Kaak, Prime minister (1947–1950)
- Mohamed Chenik, Prime minister (1950–1952)

- French protectorate of Tunisia (complete list) –

Protectorate, 1881–1956
For details see France under western Europe

=== Africa: Northeast ===
Egypt

- Khedivate of Egypt

Under British occupation since 1882
- Khedive (complete list) –

- Abbas II, Khedive (1892–1914)

- Prime ministers (complete list) –

- Mostafa Fahmy Pasha, Prime minister (1895–1908)
- Boutros Ghali, Prime minister (1908–1910)
- Mohamed Said Pasha, Prime minister (1910–1914)
- Hussein Roshdy Pasha, Prime minister (1914)

- Sultanate of Egypt

British protectorate, 1914–1922
For details see the United Kingdom under British Isles, Europe
- Sultan (complete list) –

- Hussein Kamel, Sultan (1914–1917)
- Fuad I, Sultan (1917–1922), King (1922–1936)

- Prime ministers (complete list) –

- Hussein Roshdy Pasha, Prime minister (1914–1919)
- Mohamed Said Pasha, Prime minister (1919)
- Youssef Wahba, Prime minister (1919–1920)
- Mohamed Tawfik Naseem Pasha, Prime minister (1920–1921)
- Adly Yakan Pasha, Prime minister (1921–1922)

- Kingdom of Egypt

- King (complete list) –

- Fuad I, Sultan (1917–1922), King (1922–1936)
- Farouk I, King (1936–1952)

- British High Commissioners (complete list) –

- Milne Cheetham, Acting High Commissioner (1914–1915)
- Henry McMahon, High Commissioner (1915–1917)
- Francis Reginald Wingate, High Commissioner (1917–1919)
- Edmund Allenby, High Commissioner (1919–1925)
- George Lloyd, High Commissioner (1925–1929)
- Percy Loraine, High Commissioner (1929–1933)
- Miles Lampson, High Commissioner (1934–1936)

- Prime ministers (complete list) –

- Abdel Khalek Sarwat Pasha, Prime minister (1922)
- Mohamed Tawfik Naseem Pasha, Prime minister (1922–1923)
- Yehya Ibrahim Pasha, Prime minister (1923–1924)
- Saad Zaghloul, Prime minister (1924)
- Ahmed Zeiwar Pasha, Prime minister (1924–1926)
- Adly Yakan Pasha, Prime minister (1926–1927)
- Abdel Khalek Sarwat Pasha, Prime minister (1927–1928)
- Mostafa El-Nahas, Prime minister (1928)
- Mohamed Mahmoud Pasha, Prime minister (1928–1929)
- Adly Yakan Pasha, Prime minister (1929–1930)
- Mostafa El-Nahas, Prime minister (1930)
- Ismail Sedky, Prime minister (1930–1933)
- Abdel Fattah Yahya Pasha, Prime minister (1933–1934)
- Mohamed Tawfik Naseem Pasha, Prime minister (1934–1936)
- Aly Maher Pasha, Prime minister (1936)
- Mostafa El-Nahas, Prime minister (1936–1937)
- Mohamed Mahmoud Pasha, Prime minister (1937–1939)
- Aly Maher Pasha, Prime minister (1939–1940)
- Hassan Sabry Pasha, Prime minister (1940)
- Hussein Serry Pasha, Prime minister (1940–1942)
- Mostafa El-Nahas, Prime minister (1942–1944)
- Ahmad Mahir Pasha, Prime minister (1944–1945)
- Mahmoud El Nokrashy Pasha, Prime minister (1945–1946)
- Ismail Sedky, Prime minister (1946)
- Mahmoud El Nokrashy Pasha, Prime minister (1946–1948)
- Ibrahim Abdel Hady Pasha, Prime minister (1948–1949)
- Hussein Serry Pasha, Prime minister (1949–1950)
- Mostafa El-Nahas, Prime minister (1950–1952)

Sudan

- Sultanate of Darfur (complete list) –

- Ali Dinar, Sultan (1898–1916)

- Anglo-Egyptian Sudan (complete list / complete list) –

Condominium of the United Kingdom and Egypt, 1899–1956
For details see the United Kingdom under British Isles, Europe

=== Africa: Northwest ===
Algeria

- French Algeria (complete list) –

French Départements, 1830–1962
For details see France under western Europe

Morocco and Western Sahara

- Sultanate of Morocco: Alaouite dynasty (complete list) –

- Abdelaziz, Sultan (1894–1908)
- Abdelhafid, Sultan (1908–1912)
French protectorate, 1912–1956; Spanish protectorate, 1912–1956; Tangier International Zone, 1924–1956
- Yusef, Sultan (1912–1927)
- Mohammed V, Sultan (1927–1953, 1955–1957), King (1957–1961)

- Republic of the Rif –

- Abd el-Krim, President (1921–1926)

- Spanish Sahara, (complete list) –

Overseas territory, 1884–1958; Overseas province, 1958–1975
For details see Spain in southwest Europe

=== Africa: South ===
Botswana

- Bechuanaland Protectorate (complete list) –

British protectorate, 1885–1966
For details see the United Kingdom under British Isles, Europe

Eswatini/ Swaziland

- Kingdom of Eswatini (Swaziland)

- tiNdlovukati (complete list) –

- Labotsibeni Mdluli, Ndlovukati (1894–1925), Queen Regent (1899–1903) Queen Regent under British rule (1903–1921)

- Protectorate of Swaziland

British protectorate, 1906–1968
For details see the United Kingdom under British Isles, Europe
- Kings (complete list) –

- Sobhuza II, Paramount Chief under British rule (1921–1968), King (1968–1982)

- tiNdlovukati (complete list) –

- Labotsibeni Mdluli, Ndlovukati (1894–1925), Queen Regent (1899–1903) Queen Regent under British rule (1903–1921)
- Lomawa Ndwandwe, Ndlovukati (1925–1938)
- Nukwase Ndwandwe, Ndlovukati (1938–1957)

Lesotho

- Basutoland (complete list) –

British colony, 1884–1966
For details see the United Kingdom under British Isles, Europe
- Paramount Chiefs (complete list) –

- Lerotholi, Paramount Chief (1891–1905)
- Letsie II, Paramount Chief (1905–1913)
- Nathaniel Griffith Lerotholi, Paramount Chief (1913–1939)
- Simon Seeiso Griffith, Paramount Chief (1939–1940)
- Gabasheane Masupha, Regent (1940–1941)
- 'Mantšebo, Regent (1941–1960)

Malawi

- British Central Africa Protectorate (complete list) –

British protectorate, 1893–1907

- Nyasaland (complete list) –

British protectorate, 1907–1964
For details see the United Kingdom under British Isles, Europe

Mozambique

- Angoche Sultanate –

- Umar Farelay (also known as Mahamuieva), Sultan (c.1890–1910)

- Portuguese Mozambique (complete list) –

Colony, 1498–1972; Territory, 1972–1975
For details see the Kingdom of Portugal under Southwest Europe

Namibia

- German South West Africa (complete list) –

Colony, 1884–1915
For details see the German Empire under central Europe

- South West Africa (complete list) –

League of Nations mandate of South Africa, 1915–1946; United Nations trust territory, 1946–1990
For details see the South African Republic under southern Africa

South Africa

- British Central Africa Protectorate (complete list) –

Protectorate, 1893–1907
For details see the United Kingdom under British Isles, Europe

- Cape Colony (complete list) –

British colony, 1795–1910
For details see the United Kingdom under British Isles, Europe

- Colony of Natal (complete list) –

British colony, 1843–1910
For details see the United Kingdom under British Isles, Europe

- Orange Free State (complete list) –

- Martinus Theunis Steyn, State President (1896–1902)
- Christiaan de Wet, Acting State President (1902)

- Orange River Colony (complete list) –

British colony, 1902–1910
For details see the United Kingdom under British Isles, Europe

- South African Republic (complete list) –

- Schalk Willem Burger, Acting State President (1900–1902)

- Transvaal Colony (complete list) –

British colony, 1877–1881, 1902–1910
For details see the United Kingdom under British Isles, Europe

- Union of South Africa

- Monarchs (complete list) –

- George V, King (1910–1936)
- Edward VIII, King (1936)
- George VI, King (1936–1952)

- Prime ministers (complete list) –

- Louis Botha, Prime minister (1910–1919)
- Jan Smuts, Prime minister (1919–1924)
- J. B. M. Hertzog, Prime minister (1924–1939)
- Jan Smuts, Prime minister (1939–1948)
- Daniel François Malan, Prime minister (1948–1954)

Zambia

- Kazembe –

- Kanyembo Ntemena, Mwata (1883–1885, 1886–1904)

- Barotseland (complete list) –

- Lubosi I, Mbumu wa Litunga (1885–1916)
- Mokamba–Regent, Mbumu wa Litunga (1916)
- Yeta III, Mbumu wa Litunga (1916–1945)
- Shemakone Kalonga Wina, Regent (1945–1946)
- Imwiko Lewanika, Mbumu wa Litunga (1946–1948)
- Shemakone Kalonga Wina, Regent (1948)
- Mwanawina III, Mbumu wa Litunga (1948–1968)

- Company rule in Rhodesia by the British South Africa Company (complete list) –

Company rule, 1890–1924
For details see the United Kingdom under British Isles, Europe

- Northern Rhodesia (complete list) –

British protectorate, 1924–1964
For details see the United Kingdom under British Isles, Europe

Zimbabwe

- Southern Rhodesia (complete list) –

British protectorate, 1924–1964
For details see the United Kingdom under British Isles, Europe

=== Africa: West ===
Benin

- Kingdom of Agwe –

- State reconstituted under joint Franco-German colonial authority (1901)
- Abalo Bajavi, King (1901–1930)
- Kofi Titriwe, King (1930–1935)
- Augustino Olympio, King (1937–1945)
- Kponton II, King (1946–1949)

- Kingdom of Dahomey (Dahomey kings) (French presidents) –

French Protectorate, 1894–1904
For details see France under western Europe

- French Dahomey, part of French West Africa (complete list) –

Colony, 1904–1958
For details see France under western Europe

- Hogbonu (complete list) –

- Toffa I, Ahosu (1874–1908)

Burkina Faso

- Kingdom of Koala (complete list) –

- Yenkuaga, King (c.1878–1917)
- Labidiedo, King (1918–1920)
- Yenkpaari, King (1920–1937)
- Yempaabu, King (1941–1986)

- Mossi Kingdom of Bilanga (complete list) –

Buricimba dynasty

- Yaaparigu, Bilanbedo (1887–1919)
- Boagri, Bilanbedo (1919)
- Hampandi, Bilanbedo (1919–1927)
- Banyikuba, Bilanbedo (1927–1970)

- Mossi Kingdom of Bilayanga (complete list) –

- Yenhamma, ruler (unknown date)
- Wurijuari, ruler (20th century)
- Yentagma, ruler (20th century)

- Mossi Kingdom of Bongandini (complete list) –

- Hampandi, ruler (1899–1923)

- Mossi Kingdom of Con (complete list) –

- Baahamma, ruler (1892–1905)
- Hamicuuri, ruler (1905–1942)
- Yencabri, ruler (1942–1969)

- Mossi Kingdom of Gwiriko (complete list) –

- Pintyeba Wattara, ruler (1897–1909)
- Karamoko, ruler (1909–1915)

- Mossi Kingdom of Kuala (complete list) –

- Yenkuagu, ruler (1878–1917)
- Labidiedo, ruler (1918–1920)
- Yenkpaari, ruler (1920–1937)
- Interregnum, ruler (1937–1941)
- Yempaabu, ruler (1941–?)

- Mossi Kingdom of Liptako (complete list) –

- Brahima Usman, Almami (1891–1915)
- Bubakar bi Amadu Baba Gedal, Almami (1916–1918)
- Abdurahman Diko bi Amadu, Almami (1918–1932)
- Abdullahi Sandu bi Faruku, Almami (1932–1956)

- Mossi Kingdom of Macakoali (complete list) –

- Huntani, Boopo (1897–1902)
- Yenmiama, Boopo (1902–1906)
- Haminari, Boopo (1906–1910)
- Simadari, Boopo (1910–1932)
- Hamicuuri, Boopo (1932–1932)
- Yensongu, Boopo (1932–1932)
- Wurabiari, Boopo (1932–1937)
- Yaaparigu, Boopo (1937–1943)
- Wuracaari, Boopo (1943–1945)
- Yendieri, Boopo (1945–1976)

- Mossi Kingdom of Nungu (complete list) –

- Bancandi, Nunbado (1892–1911)

- Mossi Kingdom of Pama –

- Baahamma, Jafuali (1878–1918)
- Hamicuuri, Jafuali (1918–1919)
- Yenkoari, Jafuali (1919–1929)
- Yenhamma, Jafuali (1929–1938)
- Huntani, Jafuali (1938–1952)

- Mossi Kingdom of Piéla (complete list) –

- Yentandi, Pielabedo (1856–1901)
- Kupiendieri, Pielabedo (1901–1932)
- Yentugri, Pielabedo (1932–1949)
- Yensongu, Pielabedo (1949–?)

- Mossi Kingdom of Tenkodogo (complete list) –

- Koom, Naaba (?–1933)
- Yamba Sorgo, Naaba (1933–1957)

- Mossi Kingdom of Wogodogo (complete list) –

- Naaba Sigiri, Moogo-naaba (1897–1905)
- Naaba Koom II, Moogo-naaba (1905–1942)
- Naaba Saaga II, Moogo-naaba (1942–1957)

- Mossi Kingdom of Yatenga (complete list) –

- Naaba Ligidi, Yatenga naaba (1899–1902)
- Naaba Kobga, Yatenga naaba (1902–1914)
- Naaba Tigre, Yatenga naaba (1914–1954)

- French Upper Volta part of French West Africa (complete list) –

Colony, 1919–1932, 1947–1958
For details see France under western Europe

Cape Verde

- Portuguese Cape Verde (complete list) –

Colony, 1462–1951
For details see the Kingdom of Portugal under Southwest Europe

Gambia

- Gambia Colony and Protectorate (complete list) –

British colony and protectorate, 1821–1965
For details see the United Kingdom under British Isles, Europe

Ghana

- Kingdom of Ashanti (complete list) –

- Prempeh I, Asantehene (1888–1902)
- Osei Tutu Agyeman Prempeh II, Asantehene (1935–1957)

- Gold Coast (complete list) –

British colony, 1821–1957
For details see the United Kingdom under British Isles, Europe

Guinea

- French Guinea part of French West Africa (complete list) –

Colony, 1894–1958
For details see France under western Europe

Guinea-Bissau

- Portuguese Guinea (complete list) –

Colony, 1474–1951
For details see the Kingdom of Portugal under Southwest Europe

Ivory Coast

- French Ivory Coast part of French West Africa (complete list) –

Colony, 1893–1960
For details see France under western Europe

Liberia

- Liberia (complete list) –

- Garretson W. Gibson, President (1900–1904)
- Arthur Barclay, President (1904–1912)
- Daniel Edward Howard, President (1912–1920)
- Charles D. B. King, President (1920–1930)
- Edwin Barclay, President (1930–1944)
- William Tubman, President (1944–1971)

Mali

- French Sudan part of French West Africa (complete list) –

Colony, 1880–1958
For details see France under western Europe

Mauritania

- Colonial Mauritania part of French West Africa (complete list) –

French colony, 1903–1960
For details see France under western Europe

Niger

- Dendi Kingdom: Askiya dynasty (complete list) –

- Malla, Askiya (1887–1901)
- Igoumou, Askiya (1901)

- Dosso Kingdom (complete list) –

- Zarmakoy Attikou, King (1897–1902)
- Zarmakoy Aoûta/Awta, King (1902–1913)
- Zarmakoy Moussa, King (1913–1924)
- Zarmakoy Saidou, King (1924–1938)
- Zarmakoy Moumouni, King (1938–1953)

- Upper Senegal and Niger part of French West Africa (complete list) –

French colony, 1904–1921

- Colony of Niger part of French West Africa (complete list) –

French colony, 1921–1960
For details see France under western Europe

Nigeria

- Adamawa Emirate –

- Zubayru bi Adama, Baban-Lamido (1890–1901)
- Baba Ahmadu, Baban-Lamido (1901–1903)

- Akwa Akpa (Old Calabar) –

- Eyo Etinyin, King (c.1896–c.1903)

- Kingdom of Bonny –

- Ate, Regent (1892–1914)

- Egba Ake –

- Gbadebo I, Alake (1898–1920)
- Ladapo Samuel Ademola II, Alake (1872–1962), in exile (1948–1950), ruler (1920–1962)

- Ilorin Emirate –

- Sulaymanu dan Aliyu, Emir (1896–1914)
- Shuaybu Bawa dan Zubayru, Emir (1915–1919)
- Abdulkadir Dan Bawa, Emir (1920–1959)

- Kano Emirate

- Emirs (complete list) –

- Aliyu Babba, Emir (1894–1903)

- Grand Viziers

- Ahmadu Mai Shahada, Grand Vizier (1889–1903)

- Kingdom of Nri (complete list) –

- Òbalíke, Eze Nri (1889–1911)

- Nupe Kingdom (complete list) –

- Abu Bakr dan Masaba, Etsu (1895–1897, 1899–1901)

- Opobo (complete list)–

- Obiesigha Jaja II (Frederick Sunday), King (1893–1915)
- Dipiri (Arthur Mac Pepple), King (1916–1936)
- Sodienye Jaja III (Douglas Mac Pepple), (1936–1942, 1952–1980)
- Stephen Ubogu Jaja IV, acting King (1942–1946)

- Sokoto Caliphate

- Sultans (complete list) –

- Abdur Rahman Atiku, Sultan (1891–1902)
- Muhammadu Attahiru I, Sultan (1902–1903)

- Grand viziers (complete list) –

- Muhammadu al-Bukhari, Grand Vizier (1890–1903)

- Suleja Emirate (complete list) –

- Ibrahim "Iyalai" "Dodon Gwari", Emir (1877–1902)
- Muhammad Gani, Emir (1902–1917)
- Musa Angulu, Emir (1917–1944)
- Sulaimanu Barau, Emir (1944–1979)

- Yauri Emirate –

- Abd Allahi Abarshi dan 'Ali dan Yerima, Emir (1888–1904)

- Oil Rivers Protectorate/ Niger Coast Protectorate (complete list) –

British protectorate, 1884–1893/ 1893–1900

- Lagos Colony (complete list) –

British colony, 1821–1957

- Northern Nigeria Protectorate (complete list) –

British protectorate, 1900–1914

- Southern Nigeria Protectorate (complete list) –

British protectorate, 1900–1914
For details see the United Kingdom under British Isles, Europe

Senegal

- Kingdom of Sine (complete list) –

- Mahecor Joof, Maad a Sinig (1924–c.1960)

- Saloum (complete list) –

- Fode N'Gouye Joof, Maad Saloum (1935–c.1960)

- Senegambia and Niger part of French West Africa (complete list) –

French colony, 1902–1904

- Upper Senegal and Niger part of French West Africa (complete list) –

French colony, 1904–1921

- French Senegal part of French West Africa (complete list) –

French colony, 1848–1960
For details see France under western Europe

- French West Africa (complete list) –

Federation of colonies, 1895–1958
For details see France under western Europe

Sierra Leone

- Sierra Leone Colony and Protectorate, British colony (complete list) –

British colony and protectorate, 1808–1961
For details see the United Kingdom under British Isles, Europe

Togo

- German Togoland, German protectorate (complete list) –

Protectorate, 1884–1916
For details see the German Empire under central Europe

- British Togoland (complete list) –

League of Nations Mandate Territory, 1916–1946; United Nations Trust Territory, 1946–1956
For details see the United Kingdom under British Isles, Europe

- French Togoland (complete list) –

League of Nations Mandate Territory, 1916–1946; United Nations Trust Territory, 1946–1960
For details see France under western Europe

== Americas ==
=== Americas: Caribbean ===
Cuba

- Republic of Cuba

- Presidents (complete list) –

- Tomás Estrada Palma, President (1902–1906)
- US occupation (1906–1909)
- José Miguel Gómez, President (1909–1913)
- Mario García Menocal, President (1913–1921)
- Alfredo Zayas y Alfonso, President (1921–1925)
- Gerardo Machado, President (1925–1933)
- Alberto Herrera y Franchi, Interim President (1933)
- Carlos Manuel de Céspedes y Quesada, President (1933)
- Pentarchy of 1933
- Ramón Grau, President (1933–1934)
- Carlos Hevia, Interim President (1934)
- Manuel Márquez Sterling, Interim President (1934)
- Carlos Mendieta, Interim President (1934–1935)
- José Agripino Barnet, Interim President (1935–1936)
- Miguel Mariano Gómez, President (1936)
- Federico Laredo Brú, President (1936–1940)
- Fulgencio Batista, President (1940–1944)
- Ramón Grau, President (1944–1948)
- Carlos Prío Socarrás, President (1948–1952)

- Prime ministers (complete list) –

- Carlos Saladrigas Zayas, Prime minister (1940–1942)
- Ramón Zaydín, Prime minister (1942–1944)
- Anselmo Alliegro y Milá, Prime minister (1944)
- Félix Lancís Sánchez, Prime minister (1944–1945)
- Carlos Prío Socarrás, Prime minister (1945–1947)
- Raúl López del Castillo, Prime minister (1947–1948)
- Manuel Antonio de Varona, Prime minister (1948–1950)
- Félix Lancís Sánchez, Prime minister (1950–1951)

Dominican Republic

- Second Dominican Republic (complete list) –

- Juan Isidro Jimenes Pereyra, President (1899–1902)
- Horacio Vásquez, President of the Provisional Government Junta (1902–1903)
- Alejandro Woss y Gil, President (1903)
- Carlos Felipe Morales, President (1903–1905)

- Manuel Lamarche García, Emiliano Tejera, Andrés Julio Montolío, Francisco Leonte Vásquez Lajara, Carlos Ginebra, Eladio Victoria, Federico Velásquez y Hernández, Council of Secretaries of State (1905–1906)

- Ramón Cáceres, President (1906–1911)

- Miguel Antonio Román, José María Cabral, Manuel de Jesús Troncoso de la Concha, Federico Velásquez y Hernández, Manuel Lamarche García, Emilio Tejera, Rafael Díaz, Council of Secretaries of State (1911)

- Eladio Victoria, President (1911–1912)
- Adolfo Alejandro Nouel, Provisional President (1912–1913)
- José Bordas Valdez, Provisional President (1913–1914)
- Ramón Báez, Provisional President (1914)
- Juan Isidro Jimenes Pereyra, President (1914–1916)

- Jaime Mota, Bernardo Pichardo, José Manuel Jimenes, Federico Velásquez y Hernández, Council of Secretaries of State (1916)

- Francisco Henríquez y Carvajal, President (1916)

- Third Dominican Republic (complete list) –

- Juan Bautista Vicini Burgos, Provisional President (1922–1924)
- Horacio Vásquez, President (1924–1930)
- Rafael Estrella Ureña, Acting President (1930)
- Rafael Trujillo, President (1930–1938)
- Jacinto Peynado, President (1938–1940)
- Manuel de Jesús Troncoso de la Concha, President (1940–1942)
- Rafael Trujillo, President (1942–1952)

Haiti

- Republic of Haiti (1859–1957)

- Heads of state (complete list) –

- Tirésias Simon Sam, President (1896–1902)
- Pierre Théoma Boisrond-Canal, Provisional President (1902)
- Pierre Nord Alexis, President (1902–1908)
- François C. Antoine Simon, President (1908–1911)
- Cincinnatus Leconte, President (1911–1912)
- Tancrède Auguste, President (1912–1913)
- Michel Oreste, President (1913–1914)
- Oreste Zamor, President (1914)
- Joseph Davilmar Théodore, President (1914–1915)
- Vilbrun Guillaume Sam, President (1915)
- Philippe Sudré Dartiguenave, President (1915–1922)
- Louis Borno, President (1922–1930)
- Louis Eugène Roy, President (1930)
- Sténio Vincent, President (1930–1941)
- Élie Lescot, President (1941–1946)
- Franck Lavaud, Chairman of the Military Executive Committee (1946)
- Dumarsais Estimé, President (1946–1950)
- Franck Lavaud, Chairman of the Government Junta (1950)
- Paul Magloire, President (1950–1956)

=== Americas: Central ===
Costa Rica

- First Costa Rican Republic (complete list) –

- Rafael Yglesias Castro, President (1894–1902)
- Ascensión Esquivel Ibarra, President (1902–1906)
- Cleto González Víquez, President (1906–1910)
- Ricardo Jiménez Oreamuno, President (1910–1914)
- Alfredo González Flores, President (1914–1917)
- Federico Tinoco Granados, President (1917–1919)
- Juan Quirós Segura, President (1919)
- Francisco Aguilar Barquero, President (1919–1920)
- Julio Acosta García, President (1920–1924)
- Ricardo Jiménez Oreamuno, President (1924–1928)
- Cleto González Víquez, President (1928–1932)
- Ricardo Jiménez Oreamuno, President (1932–1936)
- León Cortés Castro, President (1936–1940)
- Rafael Calderón Guardia, President (1940–1944)
- Teodoro Picado Michalski, President (1944–1948)
- Santos León Herrera, Interim President (1948)

- Republic of Costa Rica (complete list) –

- José Figueres Ferrer, President (1948–1949)
- Otilio Ulate Blanco, President (1949–1953)

El Salvador

- El Salvador (complete list) –

- Tomás Regalado, President (1898–1903)
- Pedro José Escalón, President (1903–1907)
- Fernando Figueroa, President (1907–1911)
- Manuel Enrique Araujo, President (1911–1913)
- Carlos Meléndez Ramirez, Provisional President (1913–1914)
- Alfonso Quiñónez Molina, Provisional President (1914–1915)
- Carlos Meléndez Ramirez, President (1915–1918)
- Alfonso Quiñónez Molina, Provisional President (1918–1919)
- Jorge Meléndez, President (1919–1923)
- Alfonso Quiñónez Molina, President (1923–1927)
- Pío Romero Bosque, President (1927–1931)
- Arturo Araujo, President (1931)
- Maximiliano Hernández Martínez, Provisional President (1931–1934)
- Andrés Ignacio Menéndez, Provisional President (1934–1935)
- Maximiliano Hernández Martínez, President (1935–1944)
- Andrés Ignacio Menéndez, Provisional President (1944)
- Osmín Aguirre y Salinas, Provisional President (1944–1945)
- Salvador Castaneda Castro, President (1945–1948)
- Revolutionary Council of Government, (1948–1950)
- Óscar Osorio, President (1950–1956)

Guatemala

- Guatemala (complete list) –

- Manuel Estrada Cabrera, President (1898–1920)
- Carlos Herrera, President (1920–1921)
- José María Orellana, President (1921–1926)
- Lázaro Chacón González, President (1926–1931)
- José María Reina Andrade, Acting President (1931)
- Jorge Ubico, President (1931–1944)
- Juan Federico Ponce Vaides, Acting President (1944)
- Revolutionary Government Junta, President (1944–1945)
- Juan José Arévalo, President (1945–1951)

Honduras

- Honduras (complete list) –

- Terencio Sierra, President (1899–1903)
- Juan Ángel Arias Boquín, President (1903)
- Manuel Bonilla, President (1903–1907)
- Miguel Oquelí Bustillo, Chairman of the Provisional Government Junta (1907)
- Miguel R. Dávila, President (1907–1911)
- Francisco Bertrand, Acting President (1911–1912)
- Manuel Bonilla, President (1912–1913)
- Francisco Bertrand, President (1913–1919)
- Salvador Aguirre, Acting President (1919)
- Vicente Mejía Colindres, Acting President (1919)
- Francisco Bográn, Acting President (1919–1920)
- Rafael López Gutiérrez, President (1920–1924)
- Francisco Bueso, Acting President (1924)
- Tiburcio Carías Andino, President as First Chief of the Liberating Revolution (1924)
- Vicente Tosta, Provisional President (1924–1925)
- Miguel Paz Barahona, President (1925–1929)
- Vicente Mejía Colindres, President (1929–1933)
- Tiburcio Carías Andino, President (1933–1949)
- Juan Manuel Gálvez, President (1949–1954)

Nicaragua

- Nicaragua (complete list) –

- José Santos Zelaya, President (1893–1909)
- José Madriz, Acting President (1909–1910)
- José Dolores Estrada, Acting President (1910)
- Luis Mena, Acting President (1910)
- Juan José Estrada, Provisional President (1910–1911)
- Adolfo Díaz, President (1911–1917)
- Emiliano Chamorro Vargas, President (1917–1921)
- Diego Manuel Chamorro, President (1921–1923)
- Rosendo Chamorro, Acting President (1923)
- Bartolomé Martínez, President (1923–1925)
- Carlos José Solórzano, President (1925–1926)
- Emiliano Chamorro Vargas, de facto President (1926)
- Sebastián Uriza, Acting President (1926)
- Adolfo Díaz, President (1926–1929)
- José María Moncada, President (1929–1933)
- Juan Bautista Sacasa, President (1933–1936)
- Carlos Alberto Brenes, Acting President (1936–1937)
- Anastasio Somoza García, President (1937–1947)
- Leonardo Argüello Barreto, President (1947)
- Benjamín Lacayo Sacasa, Acting President (1947)
- Víctor Manuel Román y Reyes, President (1947–1950)
- Manuel Fernando Zurita, Acting President (1950)
- Anastasio Somoza García, President (1950–1956)

Panama

- Panama (complete list) –

- Manuel Amador Guerrero, President (1904–1908)
- José Domingo de Obaldía, President (1908–1910)
- Carlos Antonio Mendoza, Acting President (1910)
- Federico Boyd, Acting President (1910)
- Pablo Arosemena, Acting President (1910–1912)
- Belisario Porras Barahona, President (1912–1916)
- Ramón Maximiliano Valdés, President (1916–1918)
- Ciro Luis Urriola, Acting President (1918)
- Pedro Antonio Díaz, Acting President (1918)
- Belisario Porras Barahona, President (1918–1920)
- Ernesto Tisdel Lefevre, Acting President (1920)
- Belisario Porras Barahona, President (1920–1924)
- Rodolfo Chiari, President (1924–1928)
- Florencio Harmodio Arosemena, President (1928–1931)
- Harmodio Arias Madrid, Acting President (1931)
- Ricardo Joaquín Alfaro Jované, President (1931–1932)
- Harmodio Arias Madrid, President (1932–1936)
- Juan Demóstenes Arosemena, President (1936–1939)
- Ezequiel Fernández, Acting President (1939)
- Augusto Samuel Boyd, Acting President (1939–1940)
- Arnulfo Arias, President (1940–1941)
- Ricardo Adolfo de la Guardia Arango, President (1941–1945)
- Enrique Adolfo Jiménez, Provisional President (1945–1948)
- Domingo Díaz Arosemena, President (1948–1949)
- Daniel Chanis Pinzón, President (1949)
- Roberto Francisco Chiari Remón, President (1949)
- Arnulfo Arias, President (1949–1951)

=== Americas: North ===
Canada

- Canada

- Monarchs (complete list) –

- George V, King (1931–1936)
- Edward VIII, King (1936)
- George VI, King (1936–1952)

- Prime ministers (complete list) –

- Wilfrid Laurier, Prime minister (1896–1911)
- Robert Borden, Prime minister (1911–1920)
- Arthur Meighen, Prime minister (1920–1921)
- William Lyon Mackenzie King, Prime minister (1921–1926)
- Arthur Meighen, Prime minister (1926)
- William Lyon Mackenzie King, Prime minister (1926–1930)
- R. B. Bennett, Prime minister (1930–1935)
- William Lyon Mackenzie King, Prime minister (1935–1948)
- Louis St. Laurent, Prime minister (1948–1957)

- Newfoundland Colony (complete list) –

British colony, 1610–1907

- Dominion of Newfoundland (complete list) –

- Monarchs (complete list) –

- Edward VII, King (1907–1910)
- George V, King (1910–1936)
- George VI, King (1936–1949)

- Prime ministers (complete list) –

- Robert Bond, Prime minister (1907–1909)
- Edward Morris, Prime minister (1909–1917)
- John Chalker Crosbie, Prime minister (1917–1918)
- William F. Lloyd, Prime minister (1918–1919)
- Michael Patrick Cashin, Prime minister (1919)
- Richard Squires, Prime minister (1919–1923)
- William Warren, Prime minister (1923–1924)
- Albert Hickman, Prime minister (1924)
- Walter Stanley Monroe, Prime minister (1924–1928)
- Richard Squires, Prime minister (1928–1932)
- Frederick C. Alderdice, Prime minister (1928, 1932–1934)

Mexico

- Mexico (complete list) –

- Porfirio Díaz, President (1884–1911)
- Francisco León de la Barra, President (1911)
- Francisco I. Madero, President (1911–1913)
- Pedro Lascuráin, President (1913)
- Victoriano Huerta, President (1913–1914)
- Francisco S. Carvajal, President (1914)
- Eulalio Gutiérrez, President (1914–1915)
- Roque González Garza, President (1915)
- Francisco Lagos Cházaro, Provisional President (1915)
- Venustiano Carranza, First Chief of the Constitutional Army (1914–1917), President (1917–1920)
- Adolfo de la Huerta, President (1920)
- Álvaro Obregón, President (1920–1924)
- Plutarco Elías Calles, President (1924–1928)
- Emilio Portes Gil, Interim President (1928–1930)
- Pascual Ortiz Rubio, President (1930–1932)
- Abelardo L. Rodríguez, President (1932–1934)
- Lázaro Cárdenas, President (1934–1940)
- Manuel Ávila Camacho, President (1940–1946)
- Miguel Alemán Valdés, President (1946–1952)

United States

- United States (complete list) –

- William McKinley, President (1897–1901)
- Theodore Roosevelt, President (1901–1909)
- William Howard Taft, President (1909–1913)
- Woodrow Wilson, President (1913–1921)
- Warren G. Harding, President (1921–1923)
- Calvin Coolidge, President (1923–1929)
- Herbert Hoover, President (1929–1933)
- Franklin D. Roosevelt, President (1933–1945)
- Harry S. Truman, President (1945–1953)

- Cherokee Nation (complete list) –

- Thomas Buffington, Principal Chief (1899–1903)
- William Charles Rogers, Principal Chief (1903–1905, 1906–1907)
- Frank J. Boudinot, Principal Chief (1905–1906)

=== Americas: South ===
Argentina

- Argentine Republic (complete list) –

- Julio Argentino Roca, President (1898–1904)
- Manuel Quintana, President (1904–1906)
- José Figueroa Alcorta, President (1906–1910)
- Roque Sáenz Peña, President (1910–1914)
- Victorino de la Plaza, President (1914–1916)
- Hipólito Yrigoyen, President (1916–1922)
- Marcelo Torcuato de Alvear, President (1922–1928)
- Hipólito Yrigoyen, President (1928–1930)
- José Félix Uriburu, President (1930–1932)
- Agustín Pedro Justo, President (1932–1938)
- Roberto María Ortiz, President (1938–1942)
- Ramón Castillo, President (1942–1943)
- Arturo Rawson, de facto President (1943)
- Pedro Pablo Ramírez, de facto President (1943–1944)
- Edelmiro Julián Farrell, de facto President (1944–1946)
- Juan Perón, President (1946–1955)

Bolivia

- Bolivia (complete list) –

- José Manuel Pando, President (1899–1904)
- Ismael Montes, President (1904–1909)
- Eliodoro Villazón, President (1909–1913)
- Ismael Montes, President (1913–1917)
- José Gutiérrez Guerra, President (1917–1920)
- Government Junta, Members: Bautista Saavedra, José María Escalier, José Manuel Ramírez (1920–1921)
- Bautista Saavedra, President (1921–1925)
- Felipe S. Guzmán, Provisional President (1925–1926)
- Hernando Siles Reyes, President (1926–1930)
- Council of Ministers, Members: Alberto Díez de Medina, Germán Antelo Arauz, Franklin Mercado, David Toro, José Aguirre Achá, Fidel Vega, Carlos Banzer, Ezequiel Romecín Calderón (1930)
- Carlos Blanco Galindo, Chairman of the Military Government Junta (1930–1931)
- Daniel Salamanca Urey, President (1931–1934)
- José Luis Tejada Sorzano, President (1934–1936)
- Germán Busch, Chairman of the Government Junta (1936)
- David Toro, Chairman of the Government Junta (1936–1937)
- Germán Busch, Chairman of the Government Junta (1937–1938), President (1938–1939)
- Carlos Quintanilla, Provisional President (1939–1940)
- Enrique Peñaranda, President (1940–1943)
- Gualberto Villarroel, Chairman of the Government Junta (1943–1944), President (1944–1946)
- Néstor Guillén, Chairman of the Provisional Government Junta (1946)
- Tomás Monje, Chairman of the Provisional Government Junta (1946–1947)
- Enrique Hertzog, President (1947–1949)
- Mamerto Urriolagoitía, President (1949–1951)

Brazil

- First Brazilian Republic (complete list) –

- Campos Sales, President (1898–1902)
- Rodrigues Alves, President (1902–1906)
- Afonso Pena, President (1906–1909)
- Nilo Peçanha, President (1909–1910)
- Hermes da Fonseca, President (1910–1914)
- Venceslau Brás, President (1914–1918)
- Delfim Moreira, President (1918–1919)
- Epitácio Pessoa, President (1919–1922)
- Artur Bernardes, President (1922–1926)
- Washington Luís, President (1926–1930)

- Republic of Acre (pt:complete list) –

- José Plácido de Castro, President (1902–1904)

- Vargas Era Brazil (complete list) –

- Military Junta: Augusto Fragoso, Isaías de Noronha, Mena Barreto, President (1930)
- Getúlio Vargas, President (1930–1945)
- José Linhares, President (1945–1946)

- Fourth Brazilian Republic (complete list) –

- Eurico Gaspar Dutra, President (1946–1951)

Chile

- Parliamentary Era Chile (complete list) –

- Federico Errázuriz Echaurren, President (1896–1901)
- Germán Riesco, President (1901–1906)
- Pedro Montt, President (1906–1910)
- Ramón Barros Luco, President (1910–1915)
- Juan Luis Sanfuentes, President (1915–1920)
- Arturo Alessandri, President (1920–1924)
- Luis Altamirano, President of Government Junta (1924–1925)
- Pedro Dartnell, Provisional President (1925)
- Emilio Bello Codesido, President of Government Junta (1925)

- Presidential Republic (1925–1973) of Chile (complete list) –

- Arturo Alessandri, President (1925)
- Emiliano Figueroa, President (1925–1927)
- Carlos Ibáñez del Campo, President (1927–1931)
- Juan Esteban Montero, President (1931–1932)
- Arturo Puga, President of Government Junta (1932)
- Carlos Dávila, Provisional President (1932)
- Bartolomé Blanche, Provisional President (1932)
- Abraham Oyanedel, Acting President (1932)
- Arturo Alessandri, President (1932–1938)
- Pedro Aguirre Cerda, President (1938–1941)
- Juan Antonio Ríos, President (1942–1946)
- Gabriel González Videla, President (1946–1952)

Colombia

- Republic of Colombia (complete list) –

- José Manuel Marroquín, President (1900–1904)
- Rafael Reyes Prieto, President (1904–1909)
- Ramón González Valencia, President (1909–1910)
- Carlos Eugenio Restrepo Restrepo, President (1910–1914)
- José Vicente Concha Ferreira, President (1914–1918)
- Marco Fidel Suárez, President (1918–1921)
- Jorge Holguín, President (1921–1922)
- Pedro Nel Ospina Vázquez, President (1922–1926)
- Miguel Abadía Méndez, President (1926–1930)
- Enrique Olaya Herrera, President (1930–1934)
- Alfonso López Pumarejo, President (1934–1938)
- Eduardo Santos Montejo, President (1938–1942)
- Alfonso López Pumarejo, President (1942–1946)
- Mariano Ospina Pérez, President (1946–1950)
- Laureano Gómez Castro, President (1950–1953)

Ecuador

- Ecuador (complete list) –

- Eloy Alfaro, Jéfe Supremo (1895–1896), Interim President (1896–1897), President (1897–1901)
- Leónidas Plaza, President (1901–1905)
- Lizardo García, President (1905–1906)
- Eloy Alfaro, Jéfe Supremo (1906), Interim President (1906–1907), President (1907–1911)
- Carlos Freile Zaldumbide, Acting President (1911)
- Emilio Estrada, President (1911)
- Carlos Freile Zaldumbide, Acting President (1911–1912)
- Francisco Andrade Marín, Acting President (1912)
- Alfredo Baquerizo, Acting President (1912)
- Leónidas Plaza, President (1912–1916)
- Alfredo Baquerizo, President (1916–1920)
- José Luis Tamayo, President (1920–1924)
- Gonzalo Córdova, President (1924–1925)
- Provisional Government (1925–1926)
- Isidro Ayora, Interim President (1926–1929), President (1929–1931)
- Luis Larrea Alba, Minister of Government (1931)
- Alfredo Baquerizo, President of the Senate (1931–1932)
- Carlos Freile Larrea, Minister of Government (1932)
- Alberto Guerrero Martínez, President of the Senate (1932)
- Juan de Dios Martínez, President (1932–1933)
- Abelardo Montalvo, Acting President (1933–1934)
- José María Velasco Ibarra, President (1934–1935)
- Antonio Pons, Acting President (1935)
- Federico Páez, Jéfe Supremo (1935–1937)
- Alberto Enríquez Gallo, Jéfe Supremo (1937–1938)
- Manuel María Borrero, Interim President (1938)
- Aurelio Mosquera, President (1938–1939)
- Carlos Alberto Arroyo del Río, Acting President (1939)
- Andrés Córdova, Acting President (1939–1940)
- Julio Enrique Moreno, Acting President (1940)
- Carlos Alberto Arroyo del Río, President (1940–1944)
- Julio Teodoro Salem, Acting President (1944)
- José María Velasco Ibarra, President of the Republic (1944), Constitutional President (1944–1946), President of the Republic (1946), Constitutional President (1946–1947)
- Carlos Mancheno Cajas, Jéfe Supremo (1947)
- Mariano Suárez Veintimilla, President (1947)
- C.J. Arosemena Tola, President (1947–1948)
- Galo Plaza, President (1948–1952)

Guyana

- British Guiana (complete list) –

British colony, 1814–1966
For details see the United Kingdom under British Isles, Europe

Paraguay

- Republic of Paraguay (complete list) –

- Emilio Aceval, President (1898–1902)
- Andrés Héctor Carvallo, President (1902)
- Juan Antonio Escurra, President (1902–1904)
- Juan Bautista Gaona, President (1904–1905)
- Cecilio Báez, President (1905–1906)
- Benigno Ferreira, President (1906–1908)
- Emiliano González Navero, President (1908–1910)
- Manuel Gondra, President (1910–1911)
- Albino Jara, President (1911)
- Liberato Marcial Rojas, President (1911–1912)
- Pedro Peña, President (1912)
- Emiliano González Navero, President (1912)
- Eduardo Schaerer, President (1912–1916)
- Manuel Franco, President (1916–1919)
- José Pedro Montero, President (1919–1920)
- Manuel Gondra, President (1920–1921)
- Eusebio Ayala, President (1921–1923)
- Eligio Ayala, President (1923–1924)
- Luis Alberto Riart, President (1924)
- Eligio Ayala, President (1924–1928)
- José Guggiari, President (1928–1932)
- Eusebio Ayala, President (1932–1936)
- Rafael Franco, President (1936–1937)
- Félix Paiva, President (1937–1939)
- José Estigarribia, President (1939–1940)
- Higinio Moríñigo, President (1940–1948)
- Juan Manuel Frutos, President (1948)
- Juan González, President (1948–1949)
- Raimundo Rolón, President (1949)
- Felipe Molas, President (1949)
- Federico Chávez, President (1949–1954)

Peru

- Republic of Peru (complete list) –

- Eduardo López de Romaña, Constitutional President (1899–1903)
- Manuel Candamo, Constitutional President (1903–1904)
- Serapio Calderón, President of the Government Junta (1904)
- José Pardo y Barreda, Constitutional President (1904–1908)
- Augusto B. Leguía y Salcedo, Constitutional President (1908–1912)
- Guillermo Billinghurst, Constitutional President (1912–1914)
- Óscar R. Benavides, Interim President (1914–1915)
- José Pardo y Barreda, Constitutional President (1915–1919)
- Augusto B. Leguía y Salcedo, Constitutional President (1919–1930)
- Manuel María Ponce Brousset, Interim President (1930)
- Luis Miguel Sánchez Cerro, President of the Provisional Government Junta (1930–1931)
- Ricardo Leoncio Elías Arias, President of the Provisional Government Junta (1931)
- Gustavo Jiménez, President of the Provisional Government Junta (1931)
- David Samanez Ocampo, President of the Southern Junta (1931)
- Luis Miguel Sánchez Cerro, Constitutional President (1931–1933)
- Óscar Benavides, Constitutional President (1933–1939)
- Manuel Prado y Ugarteche, Constitutional President (1939–1945)
- José Bustamante y Rivero, Constitutional President (1945–1948)
- Manuel A. Odría, President (1948–1950)
- Zenón Noriega Agüero, President (1950)
- Manuel A. Odría, Constitutional President (1950–1956)

Suriname

- Dutch Surinam (complete list) –

Dutch colony 1667–1954
For details see the Netherlands under western Europe

Uruguay

- Uruguay (complete list) –

- Juan Lindolfo Cuestas, President (1899–1903)
- José Batlle y Ordóñez, President (1903–1907)
- Claudio Williman, President (1907–1911)
- José Batlle y Ordóñez, President (1911–1915)
- Feliciano Viera, President (1915–1919)
- Baltasar Brum, President (1919–1923)
- José Serrato, President (1923–1927)
- Juan Campisteguy, President (1927–1931)
- Gabriel Terra, President (1931–1939)
- Alfredo Baldomir, President (1939–1943)
- Juan José de Amézaga, President (1943–1947)
- Tomás Berreta, President (1947)
- Luis Batlle Berres, President (1947–1951)

Venezuela

- United States of Venezuela (complete list) –

- Cipriano Castro, President (1899–1908)
- Juan Vicente Gómez, President (1908–1913)
- José Gil Fortoul, Interim President (1913–1914)
- Victorino Márquez Bustillos, President (1914–1922)
- Juan Vicente Gómez, President (1922–1929)
- Juan Bautista Pérez, President (1929–1931)
- Juan Vicente Gómez, President (1931–1935)
- Eleazar López Contreras, President (1935–1941)
- Isaías Medina Angarita, President (1941–1945)
- Rómulo Betancourt, President (1945–1948)
- Rómulo Gallegos, President (1948)
- Carlos Delgado Chalbaud, President (1948–1950)
- Germán Suárez Flamerich, Interim President (1950–1952)

== Asia ==
=== Asia: Central ===
Kazakhstan

- Alash Autonomy (complete list) –

- Alikhan Bukeikhanov, Prime minister (1917–1920)

Tibet

- Tibet under Qing rule (Qing emperors / Dalai Lamas) –

Manchu overlordship, 1720-1912
For details see the Qing dynasty under Eastern Asia

- Tibet (1912–1951) (complete list) –

- Thubten Gyatso, 13th Dalai Lama (1879–1933)
- Tenzin Gyatso, 14th Dalai Lama (1950–1959)

Uzbekistan

- Khanate of Khiva (complete list) –

- Muhammad Rahim Bahadur II., Khan (Feruz Khan), Khan (1864–1910)
- Isfandiyar Jurji Bahadur, Khan (1910–1918)
- Sayid Abdullah, Khan (1918–1920)

- Khorezm People's Soviet Republic

- Hoji Pahlavon Niyoz Yusuf, Chairman of the Revolutionary Committee (1920)
- Jumaniyoz Sulton Muradoghli, Chairman of the Provisional Government (1920)
- Hoji Pahlavon Niyoz Yusuf, Chairmen of the Presidium (1920–1921)
- Qoch Qoroghli, Chairmen of Provisional Revolutionary Committee (1921)
- Khudoybergan Divanoghli, Chairmen of the Presidium (1921)
- Mulla Nozir, Chairmen of the Presidium (1921)
- Allabergan, Chairmen of the Presidium (1921)
- Ata Maqsum Madrahimoghli, Chairmen of the Presidium (1921)
- Jangibay Murodoghli, Chairmen of the Presidium (1921–1922)
- Abdulla Abdurahmon Khojaoghli, Chairmen of the Presidium (1922–1923)
- K. Safaroghli, Chairmen of the Presidium (1923–1924)
- Sultonkari Jumaniyoz, Chairmen of the Presidium (1924)
- Temurkhoja Yaminoghli, Chairmen of the Presidium (1924–1925)

- Emirate of Bukhara –

Russian protectorate, 1873–1917
- Abdul-Ahad bin Muzaffar al-Din, Amir (1885–1910)
- Muhammad Alim Khan bin Abdul-Ahad, Amir (1910–1920)

- Bukharan People's Soviet Republic (complete list) –

- Mirzo Abduqodir Mansurovich Mukhitdinov, Chairman of the Provisional Revolutionary Committee (1920–1921)
- Polat Usmon Khodzhayev, Chairman of the Provisional Revolutionary Committee (1921), of the Presidium of the Central Executive Committee (1921–1922)
- Muin Jon Aminov, Chairmen of the Presidium of the Central Executive Committee (1922)
- Porsa Khodzhayev, Chairmen of the Presidium of the Central Executive Committee (1922–1925)

- Russian Turkestan (complete list) –

Russian Krai, 1867–1918
For details see the Russian Empire under Eastern Europe

=== Asia: East ===
China: Qing dynasty

- Qing dynasty (complete list) –

- Guangxu, Emperor (1875–1908)
- Puyi, Emperor (1908–1912)

China: Since 1912

- Republic of China (1912–1915)

- Presidents (complete list) –

- Sun Yat-sen, Provisional President (1912)
- Yuan Shikai, President (1912–1915)

- Premiers (complete list) –

- Tang Shaoyi, Premier (1912)
- Lu Zhengxiang, Premier (1912)
- Zhao Bingjun, Premier (1912–1913)
- Duan Qirui, Acting Premier (1913)
- Xiong Xiling, Premier (1913–1914)
- Sun Baoqi, Acting Premier (1914)
- Xu Shichang, Premier: Secretary of State (1914–1915)

- Empire of China (1915–1916)

- Emperor (complete list) –

- Yuan Shikai, Emperor (1915–1916)

- Premiers (complete list) –

- Lu Zhengxiang, Premier (1915–1916)

- Republic of China (1916–1949)

- Presidents (complete list) –

- Yuan Shikai, President (1916)
- Li Yuanhong, President (1916–1917)
- Feng Guozhang, President (1917–1918)
- Xu Shichang, President (1918–1922)
- Zhou Ziqi, Acting President (1922–1922)
- Li Yuanhong, President (1922–1923)
- Gao Lingwei, Acting President (1923)
- Cao Kun, President (1923–1924)
- Huang Fu, Acting President (1924)
- Duan Qirui, President (1924–1926)
- Hu Weide, Acting President (1926)
- Yan Huiqing, Acting President (1926)
- Du Xigui, Acting President (1926)
- Wellington Koo, Acting President (1926–1927)
- Zhang Zuolin, Generalissimo of the Military Government (1927–1928)
- Tan Yankai, President (1928)
- Chiang Kai-shek, Chairmen (1928–1931)
- Lin Sen, Chairmen (1931–1943)
- Chiang Kai-shek, Chairmen (1943–1948), President (1948–1949)

- Premiers (complete list) –

- Xu Shichang, Premier: Secretary of State (1916)
- Duan Qirui, Premier (1916–1917)
- Wang Daxie, Acting Premier (1917)
- Wang Shizhen, Acting Premier (1917–1918)
- Qian Nengxun, Acting Premier (1918–1919)
- Gong Xinzhan, Acting Premier (1919)
- Jin Yunpeng, Premier (1919–1920)
- Sa Zhenbing, Premier (1920)
- Jin Yunpeng, Premier (1920–1921)
- Yan Huiqing, Acting Premier (1921)
- Liang Shiyi, Premier (1921–1922)
- Yan Huiqing, Acting Premier (1922)
- Zhou Ziqi, Acting Premier (1922)
- Yan Huiqing, Acting Premier (1922)
- Wang Chonghui, Acting Premier (1922)
- Wang Daxie, Acting Premier (1922)
- Wang Zhengting, Acting Premier (1922–1923)
- Zhang Shaozeng, Premier (1923)
- Gao Lingwei, Premier (1923–1924)
- Sun Baoqi, Premier (1924)
- Wellington Koo, Acting Premier (1924)
- Yan Huiqing, Acting Premier (1924)
- Huang Fu, Acting Premier (1924)
- Xu Shiying, Premier (1925–1926)
- Jia Deyao, Acting Premier (1926)
- Hu Weide, Acting Premier (1926)
- Yan Huiqing, Acting Premier (1926)
- Du Xigui, Acting Premier (1926)
- Wellington Koo, Acting Premier (1926–1927)
- Pan Fu, Premier (1927–1928)
- Tan Yankai, Premier (1928–1930)
- T. V. Soong, Premier (1930)
- Chiang Kai-shek, Premier (1930–1931)
- Chen Mingshu, Premier (1931–1932)
- Sun Fo, Premier (1932–1932)
- Wang Jingwei, Premier (1932–1935)
- Chiang Kai-shek, Premier (1935–1938)
- H. H. Kung, Premier (1938–1939)
- Chiang Kai-shek, Premier (1939–1945)
- T. V. Soong, Premier (1945–1947)
- Chiang Kai-shek, Premier (1947)
- Chang Ch'ün, Premier (1947–1948)
- Weng Wenhao, Premier (1948)
- Sun Fo, Premier (1948–1949)
- He Yingqin, Premier (1949)

- Republic of China: Taiwan

- Presidents (complete list) –

- Li Zongren, Acting President (1949–1950)
- Yan Xishan, Acting President (1949–1950)
- Chiang Kai-shek, President (1950–1975)

- Premiers (complete list) –

- Yan Xishan, Premier (1949–1950)
- Chen Cheng, Premier (1950–1954)

- People's Republic of China

- Chairmen and General Secretaries of the Communist Party (complete list) and paramount leaders (complete list) –

- Mao Zedong, Chairman (1945–1976), paramount leader (1949–1976)

- Heads of state (complete list) –

- Mao Zedong, Chairman (1949–1959)

- Premiers (complete list) –

- Zhou Enlai, Premier (1949–1976)

- East Hebei Autonomous Council –

Puppet state of Japan
- Yin Ju-keng, Chairman (1935–1937)
- Chi Zongmo, Chairman (1937–1938)

- Manchukuo

- Head of State –

- Puyi, Chief Executive (1932–1934), Emperor (1934–1945)

- Prime ministers (complete list) –

- Zheng Xiaoxu, Prime minister (1932–1935)
- Zhang Jinghui, Prime minister (1935–1945)

Japan

- Empire of Japan

- Emperors (complete list) –

- Meiji, Emperor (1867–1912)
- Taishō, Emperor (1912–1926)
- Hirohito, Emperor (1926–1989)

- Prime ministers (complete list) –

- Itō Hirobumi, Prime minister (1900–1901)
- Saionji Kinmochi, Acting Prime minister (1901–1901)
- Katsura Tarō, Prime minister (1901–1906)
- Saionji Kinmochi, Prime minister (1906–1908)
- Katsura Tarō, Prime minister (1908–1911)
- Saionji Kinmochi, Prime minister (1911–1912)
- Katsura Tarō, Prime minister (1912–1913)
- Yamamoto Gonnohyōe, Prime minister (1913–1914)
- Ōkuma Shigenobu, Prime minister (1914–1916)
- Terauchi Masatake, Prime minister (1916–1918)
- Hara Takashi, Prime minister (1918–1921)
- Uchida Kosai, Acting Prime minister (1921–1921)
- Takahashi Korekiyo, Prime minister (1921–1922)
- Katō Tomosaburō, Prime minister (1922–1923)
- Uchida Kosai, Acting Prime minister (1923–1923)
- Yamamoto Gonnohyōe, Prime minister (1923–1924)
- Kiyoura Keigo, Prime minister (1924–1924)
- Katō Takaaki, Prime minister (1924–1926)
- Wakatsuki Reijirō, Prime minister (1926–1927)
- Tanaka Giichi, Prime minister (1927–1929)
- Osachi Hamaguchi, Prime minister (1929–1931)
- Kijūrō Shidehara, Acting Prime minister (1931–1931)
- Osachi Hamaguchi, Prime minister (1931–1931)
- Wakatsuki Reijirō, Prime minister (1931–1931)
- Inukai Tsuyoshi, Prime minister (1931–1932)
- Takahashi Korekiyo, Acting Prime minister (1932–1932)
- Saitō Makoto, Prime minister (1932–1934)
- Keisuke Okada, Prime minister (1934–1936)
- Fumio Gotō, Acting Prime minister (1936–1936)
- Keisuke Okada, Prime minister (1936–1936)
- Kōki Hirota, Prime minister (1936–1937)
- Senjūrō Hayashi, Prime minister (1937–1937)
- Fumimaro Konoe, Prime minister (1937–1939)
- Hiranuma Kiichirō, Prime minister (1939–1939)
- Nobuyuki Abe, Prime minister (1939–1940)
- Mitsumasa Yonai, Prime minister (1940–1940)
- Fumimaro Konoe, Prime minister (1940–1941)
- Hideki Tojo, Prime minister (1941–1944)
- Kuniaki Koiso, Prime minister (1944–1945)
- Kantarō Suzuki, Prime minister (1945–1945)
- Prince Naruhiko Higashikuni, Prime minister (1945–1945)
- Kijūrō Shidehara, Prime minister (1945–1946)
- Shigeru Yoshida, Prime minister (1946–1947)

- State of Japan

- Emperors (complete list) –

- Hirohito, Emperor (1926–1989)

- Prime ministers (complete list) –

- Tetsu Katayama, Prime minister (1947–1948)
- Hitoshi Ashida, Prime minister (1948)
- Shigeru Yoshida, Prime minister (1948–1949)

Korea

- Korean Empire (complete list) –

- Gojong, King (1863–1897), Emperor (1897–1907)
- Sunjong, Emperor (1907–1910)

- Japanese Korea, (complete list) –

Colony, 1910–1945
For details see the Japan under Eastern Asia

- North Korea: Democratic People's Republic of Korea

- Chairman of the Workers' Party (complete list) –

- Kim Tu-bong, Chairman (1946–1949)

- Prime Ministers (complete list) –

- Kim Il Sung, Prime minister (1949–1972)

- South Korea: Republic of Korea

- Presidents (complete list) –

- Syngman Rhee, President (1948–1960)

- Prime ministers (complete list) –

- Lee Beom-seok, Prime minister (1948–1950)
- Shin Sung-mo, Acting Prime minister (1950)
- Chang Myon, Prime minister (1950–1952)

Mongolia

- Bogd Khanate of Mongolia

- Khagans (complete list) –

- Bogd Khan, Khagan (1911–1924)

- Prime ministers (complete list) –

- Tögs-Ochiryn Namnansüren, Prime minister (1919)
- Gonchigjalzangiin Badamdorj, Prime minister (1919–1921)
- Jalkhanz Khutagt Sodnomyn Damdinbazar, Prime minister (1921)
- Manzushir Khutagt Sambadondogiin Tserendorj, Prime minister (1921)
- Dogsomyn Bodoo, Prime minister (1921–1922)
- Jalkhanz Khutagt Sodnomyn Damdinbazar, Prime minister (1922–1923)
- Balingiin Tserendorj, Prime minister (1923–1924)

- Mongolian People's Republic

- Heads of state (complete list) –

- Balingiin Tserendorj, Acting Head of state (1924)
- Navaandorjiin Jadambaa, Chairman (1924)
- Peljidiin Genden, Chairman (1924–1927)
- Jamtsangiin Damdinsüren, Chairman (1927–1929)
- Khorloogiin Choibalsan, Chairman (1929–1930)
- Losolyn Laagan, Chairman (1930–1932)
- Anandyn Amar, Chairman (1932–1936)
- Dansranbilegiin Dogsom, Chairman (1936–1939)
- Gonchigiin Bumtsend, Chairman (1940–1953)

- Prime ministers (complete list) –

- Balingiin Tserendorj, Prime minister (1924–1928)
- Anandyn Amar, Prime minister (1928–1930)
- Tsengeltiin Jigjidjav, Prime minister (1930–1932)
- Peljidiin Genden, Prime minister (1932–1936)
- Anandyn Amar, Prime minister (1936–1939)
- Khorloogiin Choibalsan, Prime minister (1939–1952)

Russia

- Far Eastern Soviet Republic

- Heads of State (complete list) –

- Alexander Krasnoshchyokov, Chairman of the Government (1920–1921)
- Nikolay Matveyev, Chairman of the Government (1921–1922)

- Chairmen of the Council of Ministers (complete list) –

- Alexander Krasnoshchyokov, Prime minister (1920)
- Boris Shumyatsky, Prime minister (1920–1921)
- Pyotr Nikiforov, Prime minister (1921)
- Nikolay Matveyev, Prime minister (1921–1922)
- Pyotr Kobozev, Prime minister (1922)

=== Asia: Southeast ===
Brunei

- Protectorate of Brunei (complete list) –

British protectorate, 1888–1984
- Hashim Jalilul Alam Aqamaddin, Sultan (1885–1906)
- Muhammad Jamalul Alam II, Sultan (1906–1924)
- Ahmad Tajuddin, Sultan (1924–1950)
- Omar Ali Saifuddien III, Sultan (1950–1967)

Cambodia

- French Protectorate of Cambodia

Protectorate, 1863–1984, part of French Indochina 1887–1953
Japanese occupation of Cambodia 1941–1945
- Kings (complete list) –

- Norodom, King (1860–1904)
- Sisowath, King (1904–1927)
- Sisowath Monivong, King (1927–1941)
- Norodom Sihanouk, King (1941–1955)

- Prime ministers (complete list) –

- Norodom Sihanouk, Prime minister (1945, 1950, 1952)
- Son Ngoc Thanh, Prime minister (1945)
- Sisowath Monireth, Prime minister (1945–1946)
- Sisowath Youtevong, Prime minister (1946–1947)
- Sisowath Watchayavong, Prime minister (1947–1948)
- Chhean Vam, Prime minister (1948)
- Penn Nouth, Prime minister (1948–1949, 1953)
- Yem Sambaur, Prime minister (1949, 1949–1950)
- Ieu Koeus, Prime minister (1949)
- Sisowath Monipong, Prime minister (1950–1951)
- Oum Chheang Sun, Prime minister (1951)
- Huy Kanthoul, Prime minister (1951–1952)

Indonesia

- Dutch East Indies (complete list) –

Dutch colony 1800–1811, 1816–1949
For details see the Netherlands under western Europe

Indonesia: Java

- Sumenep –

- Pangeran Pakunataningrat, Regent (1883–1901)
- Pangeran Arya Prataming Kusuma, Regent (1901–1926)
- Tumenggung Arya Prabuwinata, Regent (1926–1929)

- Surakarta Sunanate (complete list) –

- Pakubuwono X, Sultan (1893–1939)
- Pakubuwono XI, Sultan (1939–1945)

- Yogyakarta Sultanate (complete list) –

- Hamengkubuwono VII, Sultan (1877–1921)
- Hamengkubuwono VIII, Sultan (1921–1939)
- Hamengkubuwono IX, Sultan (1939–1946)

- Mangkunegaran (complete list) –

- Mangkunegara VI, Sultan (1896–1916)
- Mangkunegara VII, Sultan (1916–1944)
- Mangkunegara VIII, Sultan (1944–1946)

- Pakualaman (complete list) –

- Pakualam VI, Sultan (1901–1902)
- Pakualam VII, Sultan (1906–1937)
- Pakualam VIII, Sultan (1937–1946)

- Islamic State of Indonesia –

- Sekarmadji Maridjan Kartosuwiryo, Imam (1949–1962)

Indonesia: Sumatra

- Aceh Sultanate (complete list) –

- Alauddin Muhammad Da'ud Syah II, Sultan (1874–1903)

- Sultanate of Deli (complete list) –

- Ma'mun Al Rashid Perkasa Alamyah, Sultan (1873–1924)
- Amaluddin Sultan Al Sani Perkasa Alamsyah, Sultan (1924–1945)
- Tuanku Sultan Otteman II, Sultan (1945–1946)

- Sultanate of Langkat –

- Abdul Aziz Abdul Jalil Rakhmat Shah, Sultan (1893–1927)
- Mahmud Abdul Jalil Rakhmat Shah, Sultan (1927–1946)

- Sultanate of Siak Sri Indrapura (complete list) –

- Al-Sayyid al-Sharif Hashim Abdul Jalil Muzaffar Shah, Sultan (1889–1908)
- Syarif Kasim II, Sultan (1915–1946)

- Sultanate of Serdang (complete list) –

- Al-Marhum Perbaungan, Sultan (1879–1946)

- Riau-Lingga Sultanate (complete list) –

- Abdul Rahman II Muazzam Shah, Sultan (1883–1911)

- Jambi Sultanate –
  Thaha Safiuddin, Sultan (1855–1858, 1900–1904)

Indonesia: Kalimantan (Borneo)

- Sultanate of Bulungan –

- Pengian Kesuma, Queen (1899–1901)
- Kasimuddin, Sultan (20th century)
- Datu Mansyur, Acting Sultan (1925–1930)
- Maulana Ahmad Sulaimanuddin, Sultan (1930–1931)
- Maulana Muhammad Jalaluddin, Sultan (1931–1950)

- Pontianak Sultanate (complete list) –

- Syarif Muhammad Alkadrie, Sultan (1895–1944)
- Syarif Hamid II, Sultan (1945–1950)

- Sultanate of Sambas (complete list) –

- Muhammad Shafi ud-din II, Sultan (1866–1924)
- Muhammad 'Ali Shafi ud-din II, Sultan (1924–1926)
- Muhammad Tayeb, Chief of the Assembly Council (1926–1931)
- Muhammad Ibrahim Shafi ud-din, Sultan (1931–1943)

- Sultanate of Sintang –

- Panembahan Kusuma Negara II, Panembahan (1889–1905)
- Sri Paduka Tuanku Haji Gusti Adi 'Abdu'l-Majid ibni al-Marhum Panembahan Ismail, Panembahan Kusuma Negara III, Panembahan (1905–1913)
- Ade Muhammad Jun 'Abdu'l-Kadir Pangeran Adipati Temenggong Setia Agama Wakil, Panembahan (1913–1934)
- Panembahan Kusuma Negara IV, Panembahan (1934–1944)
- Panembahan Kusuma Negara V, Panembahan (1944–1947)

Indonesia: Sulawesi

- Sultanate of Gowa –

- Husain, Sultan (1895–1906)
- Muhammad Tahur Muhibuddin, Sultan (1936–1945)

- Luwu –

- Iskandar Opu Daeng Pali', Datu (1883–1901)
- Andi Kambo, Datu (1901–1935)
- Andi DJemma, Datu (1935–1965)

Indonesia: Lesser Sunda Islands

- Kingdom of Larantuka –

- Lorenzo II, Raja (c.1886–1904)

- Bima Sultanate (complete list) –

- Ibrahim, Sultan (1881–1915)
- Muhammad Salahuddin, Sultan (1915–1949)

Indonesia: West Timor

- Amanatun (complete list) –

- Muti Banu Naek, Raja (c.1899–1915)
- Kusa Banu Naek, Raja (1916–1919)
- Kolo Banu Naek, Raja (1920–1946)
- Lodeweyk Lourens Don Louis Banu Naek, Raja (1946–1962)

- Amarasi (complete list) –

- Rasi Koroh, Raja (1872–1887, 1892–1914)
- Isaac Koroh, Raja (1914–1923)
- Alexander Koroh, Raja (1923–1925)
- Hendrik Arnold Koroh, Raja (1925–1949)

- Amabi (complete list) –

- Kusa, Raja (1895–1901)
- Arnoldus, Raja (1901)
- Junus Amtaran, Raja (1901–1903)
- Kase Kome, Raja (1903–1912)
- Jacob Ch. Amabi, Raja (1912–1917)

- Sonbai Besar (complete list) –

- Nai Sobe Sonbai III, Emperor (1885–1906)

- Sonbai Kecil (complete list) –

- Said Meis Nisnoni, Raja (1890–1902)
- Baki Bastian Meis Nisnoni, Raja (1905–1911)
- Nicolaas Nisnoni, Raja (1911–1917)

- Amanuban (complete list) –

- Bil Nope, Raja (c.1870–1910)
- Noni Nope, Raja (1910–1920)
- Pae Nope, Raja (1920–1946)
- Paulus Nope, Raja (1946–1949)
- Kusa Nope, Raja (1946–1958)

Indonesia: Maluku Islands

- Sultanate of Bacan (complete list) –

- Muhammad Usman, Sultan (1900–1935)
- Muhammad Muhsin, Sultan (1935–1950)

- Sultanate of Tidore (complete list) –

Dutch protectorate 1657–1905
- Iskandar Sahajuhan, Sultan (1893–1905)
- Zainal Abidin Alting, Sultan (1947–1950)

- Sultanate of Ternate (complete list) –

Dutch protectorate 1683–1915
- Muhammad Ilham/ Kolano Ara Rimoi, Sultan (1900–1902)
- Haji Muhammad Usman Shah, Sultan (1902–1915)
- Iskandar Muhammad Jabir Shah, Sultan (1929–1950)

- Republic of South Maluku (complete list) –

- Johanis Manuhutu, President (1950)
- Chris Soumokil, President (1950–1966)

Indonesia: All

- Republic of Indonesia (1945–1949) / United States of Indonesia

- Presidents (complete list) –

- Sukarno, President (1945–1967)

- Prime ministers (complete list) –

- Sutan Sjahrir, Prime minister (1945–1947)
- Amir Sjarifuddin, Prime minister (1947–1948)
- Mohammad Hatta, Prime minister (1948–1950)

- Liberal democracy period in Indonesia

- Presidents (complete list) –

- Sukarno, President (1945–1967)

- Prime ministers (complete list) –

- Halim, Prime minister (1950)
- Mohammad Natsir, Prime minister (1950–1951)

Laos

- Kingdom of Champasak (complete list) –

- Ratsadanay, King (1900–1904), Regional Governor (1904–1934)

- French Protectorate of Luang Phrabang (complete list) –

Protectorate and constituent of French Indochina (1893–1953)
- Zakarine, King (1895–1904)
- Sisavang Vong, King of Luang Phrabang (1904–1945), King of Laos (1946–1953)

- Kingdom of Laos

- Monarchs (complete list) –

- Sisavang Vong, King of Luang Phrabang (1904–1945), King of Laos (1946–1953)

- Prime ministers (complete list) –

- Phetsarath Ratanavongsa, Prime minister (1945)
- Phaya Khammao, Prime minister (1945–1946)
- Kindavong, Prime minister (1946–1947)
- Souvannarath, Prime minister (1947–1948)
- Boun Oum, Prime minister (1948–1950)
- Phoui Sananikone, Prime minister (1950–1951)

Malaysia

Peninsular Malaysia

- Kedah Sultanate (complete list) –

- Abdul Hamid Halim Shah ll, Sultan, (1881–1943)
- Badlishah Shah, Sultan, (1943–1957)

- Kelantan Sultanate: Patani dynasty (complete list) –

- Muhammad IV Ibni Sultan Muhammad III, Sultan (1900–1920)
- Ismail Ibni Almarhum Sultan Muhammad IV, Sultan (1920–1944)
- Ibrahim Ibni Almarhum Sultan Muhammad IV, Sultan (1944–1957)

- Perak Sultanate: Siak dynasty (complete list) –

- Idris Murshidul Azzam Shah, Sultan (1887–1916)
- Abdul Jalil Nasiruddin Muhtaram Shah, Sultan (1916–1918)
- Iskandar, Sultan (1918–1938)
- Abdul Aziz al-Mu’tasim Billah Shah, Sultan (1938–1948)
- Yussuff Izzuddin Shah, Sultan (1948–1957)

- Terengganu Sultanate (complete list) –

- Zainal Abidin III, Sultan (1881–1918)
- Muhammad Shah II, Sultan (1918–1920)
- Sulaiman Badrul Alam Shah, Sultan (1920–1942)
- Ali Shah, Sultan (1942–1945)
- Ismail Nasiruddin Shah, Sultan (1945–1957)

- Selangor Sultanate (complete list) –

- Sulaiman, Sultan (1896–1937)
- Hisamuddin, Sultan (1937–1942, 1945–1957)
- Musa Ghiatuddin Riayat Shah, Sultan (1942–1945)

- Negeri Sembilan (complete list) –

- Muhammad, Yamtuan (1888–1933)
- Abdul Rahman, Yamtuan (1933–1957)

- Perlis (complete list) –

- Syed Saffi Jamalullail, Raja (1887–1905)
- Syed Alwi Jamalullail, Raja (1905–1943)
- Syed Hamzah Jamalullail, Raja (1943–1945)
- Syed Harun Putra Jamalullail, Raja (1945–1957)

- Federated Malay States (complete list) –

British protectorate, 1895–1942, 1945–1946

- Unfederated Malay States (complete list) –

British protectorate, 1826–1942, 1945–1946

- Straits Settlements (complete list) –

British protectorate, 1826–1942, 1945–1946

- Malayan Union (complete list) –

British colony, 1946–1948
For details see the United Kingdom under British Isles, Europe

Malaysian Borneo

- Kingdom of Sarawak (complete list) –

- Charles Brooke, Rajah (1868–1917)
- Charles Vyner Brooke, Rajah (1917–1946)

- Crown Colony of Sarawak (complete list) –

British colony, 1946–1963

- Crown Colony of Labuan (complete list) –

British colony, 1848–1890, 1904–1906, 1907–1941, 1945–1946

- North Borneo/Crown Colony (complete list) –

British colony, 1888–1941, 1945–1946; Crown colony, 1946–1963
For details see the United Kingdom under British Isles, Europe

Myanmar / Burma

- British Burma, part of the British Raj (complete list) –

British colony, 1824–1948
For details see the United Kingdom under British Isles, Europe

- State of Burma

Puppet state of Japan
- Ba Maw, Naingandaw Adipadi and Prime Minister (1943–1945)

- Union of Burma

- Presidents (complete list) –

- Sao Shwe Thaik, President (1948–1952)

- Prime ministers (complete list) –

- U Nu, Prime minister (1948–1956)

Philippines

- Sultanate of Sulu (complete list) –

- Jamalul Kiram II, Sultan (1894–1915)

- Sultanate of Maguindanao (complete list) –

- Mangigin, Sultan (1896–1926)

- Spanish East Indies, part of the Captaincy General of the Philippines (complete list) –

Colony, 1565–1901
For details see Spain in southwest Europe

- Tagalog Republic –

- Macario Sakay, President (1902–1906)

- First Philippine Republic

- Emilio Aguinaldo, President of the Revolutionary Government (1898–1899), President of the First Republic (1899–1901)

- Insular Government of the Philippine Islands (complete list) –

United States territory, 1901–1935
For details see the United States in North America

- Philippines

- Presidents (complete list) –

First Philippine Republic
- Emilio Aguinaldo, President (1899–1901)
Commonwealth of the Philippines
- Manuel L. Quezon, President (1935–1944)
- Sergio Osmeña, President (1944–1946)
Second Philippine Republic: Japanese puppet state
- José P. Laurel, President (1943–1945)
Third Philippine Republic
- Manuel Roxas, President (1946–1948)
- Elpidio Quirino, President (1948–1953)

- Prime ministers (complete list) –

Commonwealth of the Philippines
- Jorge B. Vargas, Presiding Officer of Executive Commission, de facto head of government (1942–1943)

Singapore

- Colony of Singapore (complete list) –

British crown colony as part of the Straits Settlements, 1867–1963
For details see the United Kingdom under British Isles, Europe

Thailand

- Siam/Thailand: Rattanakosin Kingdom (complete list) –

- Monarchs (complete list) –

- Chulalongkorn, King (1868–1910)
- Vajiravudh, King (1910–1925)
- Prajadhipok, King (1925–1935)
- Ananda Mahidol, King (1935–1946)
- Bhumibol Adulyadej, King (1946–2016)

- Prime ministers (complete list) –

- Phraya Manopakorn Nititada, Prime minister (1932–1933)
- Phraya Phahon Phonphayuhasena, Prime minister (1933–1938)
- Plaek Phibunsongkhram, Prime minister (1938–1944)
- Khuang Aphaiwong, Prime minister (1944–1945)
- Tawee Boonyaket, Prime minister (1945)
- Seni Pramoj, Prime minister (1945–1946)
- Khuang Aphaiwong, Prime minister (1946)
- Pridi Banomyong, Prime minister (1946)
- Thawan Thamrongnawasawat, Prime minister (1946–1947)
- Khuang Aphaiwong, Prime minister (1947–1948)
- Plaek Phibunsongkhram, Prime minister (1948–1957)

- Pattani Kingdom: Second Kelantanese dynasty (complete list) –

- Abdul Kadir Kamaruddin Syah, Sultan (1899–1902)

Timor

- Portuguese Timor (complete list) –

Colony, 1702–1975
For details see the Kingdom of Portugal under Southwest Europe

Vietnam

- Nguyễn dynasty (complete list) –

- Thành Thái, Emperor (1889–1907)
- Duy Tân, Emperor (1907–1916)
- Khải Định, Emperor (1916–1925)
- Bảo Đại, Emperor (1925–1945)

- Annam (French protectorate) (complete list) –

French Protectorate, 1883–1945, 1945–1948

- French Indochina (complete list) –

Colony, 1887–1946
Vietnamese constituents are below; for details see France under western Europe
- Cochinchina

French Colony, 1862–1949

- Annam Protectorate

French Protectorate, 1883–1945, 1945–1948

- Tonkin Protectorate

French Protectorate, 1884–1949

For details see France under western Europe

- Empire of Vietnam

Puppet state of Japan, 1945
- Emperor (complete list) –

- Bảo Đại, Emperor (1945)

- Prime minister (complete list) –

- Trần Trọng Kim, Prime minister (1945)

- Democratic Republic of Vietnam (North Vietnam, 1945–1976)

- Presidents (complete list) –

- Ho Chi Minh, President (1945–1969)

- Prime ministers (complete list) –

- Ho Chi Minh, Prime minister (1945–1955)

- State of Vietnam (South Vietnam, 1949–1955)

- General Secretaries of the Communist Party (complete list) –

- Trường Chinh, General Secretary (1941–1956)

- Presidents (complete list) –

- Bảo Đại, President (1949–1955)

- Prime ministers (complete list) –

- Bảo Đại, Prime minister (1949–1950)
- Nguyễn Phan Long, Prime minister (1950)
- Trần Văn Hữu, Prime minister (1950–1952)

=== Asia: South ===
Afghanistan

- Emirate of Afghanistan: Barakzai dynasty (complete list) –

- Abdur Rahman Khan, Emir (1880–1901)
- Habibullah Khan, Emir (1901–1919)
- Nasrullah Khan, Emir (1919)

- Kingdom of Afghanistan

- Kings (complete list) –

- Amanullah Khan, King (1919–1929)
- Inayatullah Khan, King (1929)
- Habibullah Kalakani, King (1929)
- Mohammed Nadir Shah, King (1929–1933)
- Mohammed Zahir Shah, King (1933–1973)

- Prime ministers (complete list) –

- Mohammad Hashim Khan, Prime minister (1929–1946)
- Shah Mahmud Khan, Prime minister (1946–1953)

=== Asia: West ===
Bahrain

- Hakims of Bahrain (complete list) –

Protectorate of the United Kingdom, 1861–1971
- Isa ibn Ali Al Khalifa, Hakim (1869–1923)
- Hamad ibn Isa Al Khalifa, Hakim (1923–1942)
- Salman ibn Hamad Al Khalifa, Hakim (1942–1961)

Cyprus

- British Cyprus (complete list) –

Colony, 1878–1960
For details see the United Kingdom under British Isles, Europe

Iran

- Sublime State of Persia: Qajar dynasty

- Shahs (complete list) –

- Mozaffar ad-Din Shah Qajar, Shah (1896–1907)
- Mohammad Ali Shah Qajar, Shah (1907–1909)
- Ahmad Shah Qajar, Shah (1909–1925)

- Persian Socialist Soviet Republic –

- Mirza Kuchik Khan, Chairman (1920–1921)

- Imperial State of Iran: Pahlavi dynasty

- Shahs (complete list) –

- Reza Pahlavi, Shah (1925–1941)
- Mohammad Reza Pahlavi, Shah (1941–1979)

Iraq

- Mandatory Iraq: Kingdom of Iraq under British Administration

- Kings (complete list) –

- Faisal I, King (1921–1933)

- Prime ministers (complete list) –

- Abd Al-Rahman Al-Gillani, Prime minister (1920–1922)
- Abdul-Muhsin Al-Saadoun, Prime minister (1922–1923, 1925–1926, 1928–1929, 1929)
- Jaafar Al-Askari, Prime minister (1923–1924, 1926–1928)
- Yasin al-Hashimi, Prime minister (1924–1925, 1935–1936)
- Tawfeeq Al-Suwaidi, Prime minister (1929, 1946, 1950)
- Naji Al-Suwaidi, Prime minister (1929–1930)
- Nuri al-Said, Prime minister (1930–1932, 1938–1940, 1941–1944, 1946–1947, 1949, 1950–1952, 1954–1957, 1958)

- Kingdom of Iraq

- Kings (complete list) –

- Faisal I, King (1921–1933)
- Ghazi I, King (1933–1939)
- 'Abd al-Ilah, Regent (1939–1953)
- Faisal II, King (1939–1958)

- Prime ministers (complete list) –

- Naji Shawkat, Prime minister (1932–1933)
- Rashid Ali al-Gaylani, Prime minister (1933, 1940–1941, 1941)
- Jameel Al-Madfaai, Prime minister (1933–1934, 1935, 1937–1938, 1941, 1953)
- Ali Jawdat Al-Ayyubi, Prime minister (1934–1935, 1949–1950, 1957)
- Yasin al-Hashimi, Prime minister (1924–1925, 1935–1936)
- Hikmat Sulayman, Prime minister (1936–1937)
- Nuri al-Said, Prime minister (1930–1932, 1938–1940, 1941–1944, 1946–1947, 1949, 1950–1952, 1954–1957, 1958)
- Taha al-Hashimi, Prime minister (1941)
- Hamdi al-Pachachi, Prime minister (1944–1946)
- Tawfeeq Al-Suwaidi, Prime minister (1929, 1946, 1950)
- Arshad al-Umari, Prime minister (1946, 1954)
- Salih Jabr, Prime minister (1947–1948)
- Mohammad Al-Sadr, Prime minister (1948)
- Muzahim al-Pachachi, Prime minister (1948–1949)

Israel

- Israel

- Heads of state (complete list) –

- David Ben-Gurion, Chairman (1948)
- Chaim Weizmann, Chairman (1948–1949), President (1949–1952)

- Prime ministers (complete list) –

- David Ben-Gurion, Prime minister (1948–1953)

Jordan

- Emirate of Transjordan

- Monarchs (complete list) –

- Abdullah I, Emir (1921–1946), King (1946–1951)

- Prime ministers (complete list) –

- Rashid Tali’a, Prime minister (1921)
- Mazhar Raslan, Prime minister (1921–1922)
- Rida Pasha al-Rikabi, Prime minister (1922–1923)
- Mazhar Raslan, Acting Prime minister (1923)
- Hasan Khalid Abu al-Huda, Prime minister (1923–1924)
- Rida Pasha al-Rikabi, Prime minister (1924–1926)
- Hasan Khalid Abu al-Huda, Prime minister (1926–1931)
- Abd Allah Siraj, Prime minister (1931–1933)
- Ibrahim Hashem, Prime minister (1933–1938)
- Tawfik Abu al-Huda, Prime minister (1938–1944)
- Samir al-Rifai, Prime minister (1944–1945)
- Ibrahim Hashem, Prime minister (1945–1946)

- Kingdom of Jordan

- Monarchs (complete list) –

- Abdullah I, Emir (1921–1946), King (1946–1951)

- Prime ministers (complete list) –

- Ibrahim Hashem, Prime minister (1946–1947)
- Samir al-Rifai, Prime minister (1947)
- Tawfik Abu al-Huda, Prime minister (1947–1950)
- Sa`id al-Mufti, Prime minister (1950)
- Samir al-Rifai, Prime minister (1950–1951)

Kuwait

- Sheikhdom of Kuwait (complete list) –

- Mubarak I, Sheikh (1896–1915)
- Jaber II, Sheikh (1915–1917)
- Salim I, Sheikh (1917–1921)
- Ahmad I, Sheikh (1921–1950)
- Abdullah III, Sheikh (1950–1961), Emir (1961–1965)

Lebanon

- Lebanon

- Presidents (complete list) –

- Émile Eddé, President (1943)
- Bechara El Khoury, President (1943–1952)

- Prime ministers (complete list) –

- Riad Al Solh, Prime minister (1943–1945)
- Abdul Hamid Karami, Prime minister (1945–1945)
- Sami as-Solh, Prime minister (1945–1946)
- Saadi Al Munla, Prime minister (1946)
- Riad Al Solh, Prime minister (1946–1951)

Oman

- Sultanate/ State of Muscat and Oman (complete list) –

- Faisal, Sultan (1888–1913)
- Taimur, Sultan (1913–1932)
- Said III, Sultan (1932–1970)

Qatar

- Qatar (complete list) –

- Jassim bin Mohammed Al Thani, Emir (1878–1913)
- Abdullah bin Jassim Al Thani, Emir (1913–1949)
- Ali bin Abdullah Al Thani, Emir (1949–1960)

Saudi Arabia

- Emirate of Jabal Shammar –

- Abdul-Aziz bin Mitab, Emir (1897–1906)
- Mutʿib bin ʿAbd al-ʿAzīz, Emir (1906)
- Sultān bin Ḥammūd, Emir (1906-1907)
- Saʿūd bin Ḥammūd, Emir (1907-1908)
- Saud bin Abdulaziz, Emir (1908–1920)
- ʿAbdullah bin Mutʿib, Emir (1920–1921)
- Muḥammad bin Ṭalāl, Emir (1921)

- Idrisid Emirate of Asir –

- Sayyid Muhammad ibn Ali al-Idrisi, Emir (1909–1923)
- Sayyid Ali, Emir (1923–1926)
- Sayyid al-Hasan, Emir (1926–1930)

- Kingdom of Hejaz –

- Hussein bin Ali, King (1916–1924)
- Ali bin Hussein, King (1924–1925)

- Emirate of Nejd and Hasa (complete list) –

- Ibn Saud, Emir (1902–1921), Sultan (1921–1927), King (1926–1953)

- Sultanate of Nejd (complete list) –

- Ibn Saud, Emir (1902–1921), Sultan (1921–1927), King (1926–1953)

- Kingdom of Hejaz and Nejd (complete list) –

- Ibn Saud, Emir (1902–1921), Sultan (1921–1927), King (1926–1953)

- Saudi Arabia (complete list) –

- Ibn Saud, Emir (1902–1921), Sultan (1921–1927), King (1926–1953)

Syria

- Arab Kingdom of Syria

- Monarchs (complete list) –

- Faisal I, King (1920)

- Prime ministers (complete list) –

- Rida Pasha al-Rikabi, Prime minister (1920)
- Hashim al-Atassi, Acting Prime minister (1920)
- Ala al-Din al-Durubi Basha, Prime minister (1920)
- Jamil al-Ulshi, Prime minister (1920)

- First Syrian Republic

- Presidents (complete list) –

- Shukri al-Quwatli, President (1945–1949)
- Husni al-Za'im, President (1949)
- Sami al-Hinnawi, Acting President (1949)

- Prime ministers (complete list) –

- Saadallah al-Jabiri, Prime minister (1945–1946)
- Khalid al-Azm, Acting Prime minister (1946)
- Jamil Mardam Bey, Prime minister (1946–1948)
- Khalid al-Azm, Prime minister (1948–1949)
- Husni al-Za'im, Prime minister (1949)
- Muhsin al-Barazi, Prime minister (1949)

- Second Syrian Republic

- Presidents (complete list) –

- Hashim al-Atassi, President (1949–1951)

- Prime ministers (complete list) –

- Hashim al-Atassi, Prime minister (1949)
- Nazim al-Kudsi, Prime minister (1949)
- Khalid al-Azm, Prime minister (1949–1950)
- Nazim al-Kudsi, Prime minister (1950–1951)

Turkey

- Ottoman (Turkish) Empire

- Sultans –

- Abdul Hamid II, Sultan (1876–1909)
- Mehmed V, Sultan (1909–1918)
- Mehmed VI, Sultan (1918–1922)

- Grand Viziers –

- Halil Rifat Pasha, Grand Vizier (1895–1901)
- Mehmed Said Pasha, Grand Vizier (1901–1903)
- Mehmed Ferid Pasha, Grand Vizier (1903–1908)
- Mehmed Said Pasha, Grand Vizier (1908)
- Kâmil Pasha, Grand Vizier (1908–1909)
- Hüseyin Hilmi Pasha, Grand Vizier (1909)
- Ahmet Tevfik Pasha, Grand Vizier (1909)
- Hüseyin Hilmi Pasha, Grand Vizier (1909–1910)
- Ibrahim Hakki Pasha, Grand Vizier (1910–1911)
- Mehmed Said Pasha, Grand Vizier (1911–1912)
- Gazi Ahmed Muhtar Pasha, Grand Vizier (1912)
- Kâmil Pasha, Grand Vizier (1912–1913)
- Mahmud Shevket Pasha, Grand Vizier (1913)
- Said Halim Pasha, Grand Vizier (1913–1917)
- Mehmed Talat Pasha, Grand Vizier (1917–1918)
- Ahmed Izzet Pasha, Grand Vizier (1918)
- Ahmet Tevfik Pasha, Grand Vizier (1918–1919)
- Damat Ferid Pasha, Grand Vizier (1919)
- Ali Rıza Pasha, Grand Vizier (1919–1920)
- Salih Hulusi Pasha, Grand Vizier (1920)
- Damat Ferid Pasha, Grand Vizier (1920)
- Ahmet Tevfik Pasha, Grand Vizier (1920–1922)

- Republic of Ararat –

- Ibrahim Haski, President (1927–1930)

- Ankara Government of Turkey (1920–1923)

- Mustafa Kemal Atatürk, Prime minister (1920–1921)
- Fevzi Çakmak, Prime minister (1921–1922)
- Rauf Orbay, Prime minister (1922–1923)
- Fethi Okyar, Prime minister (1923)

- Republic of Turkey

- Presidents (complete list) –

- Mustafa Kemal Atatürk, President (1923–1938)
- İsmet İnönü, President (1938–1950)
- Celâl Bayar, President (1950–1960)

- Prime ministers (complete list) –

- İsmet İnönü, Prime minister (1923–1924)
- Fethi Okyar, Prime minister (1924–1925)
- İsmet İnönü, Prime minister (1925–1937)
- Celâl Bayar, Prime minister (1937–1939)
- Refik Saydam, Prime minister (1939–1942)
- Ahmet Fikri Tüzer, Acting Prime minister (1942)
- Şükrü Saracoğlu, Prime minister (1942–1946)
- Recep Peker, Prime minister (1946–1947)
- Hasan Saka, Prime minister (1947–1949)
- Şemsettin Günaltay, Prime minister (1949–1950)
- Adnan Menderes, Prime minister (1950–1960)

United Arab Emirates: Trucial States

- Emirate of Abu Dhabi –

- Zayed bin Khalifa Al Nahyan, ruler (1855–1909)
- Tahnun bin Zayed Al Nahyan, ruler (1909–1912)
- Hamdan bin Zayed Al Nahyan, ruler (1912–1922)
- Sultan bin Zayed Al Nahyan, ruler (1922–1926)
- Saqr bin Zayed Al Nahyan, ruler (1926–1928)
- Shakhbut bin Sultan Al Nahyan, ruler (1928–1966)

- Emirate of Dubai –

- Maktoum bin Hasher Al Maktoum, ruler (1894–1906)
- Butti bin Suhail Al Maktoum, ruler (1906–1912)
- Saeed bin Maktoum bin Hasher Al Maktoum, ruler (1912–1958)

- Emirate of Sharjah –

- Saqr bin Khalid Al Qasimi, ruler (1883–1914)
- Khalid bin Ahmad Al Qasimi, ruler (1914–1924)
- Sultan bin Saqr Al Qasimi II, ruler (1924–1951)

- Emirate of Ajman –

- Abdulaziz bin Humaid Al Nuaimi, ruler (1900–1910)
- Humaid bin Abdulaziz Al Nuaimi, ruler (1910–1928)
- Rashid bin Humaid Al Nuaimi III, ruler (1928–1981)

- Umm Al Quwain –

- Ahmad bin Abdullah Al Mualla, ruler (1873–1904)
- Rashid bin Ahmad Al Mualla, ruler (1904–1922)
- Abdullah bin Rashid Al Mualla II, ruler (1922–1923)
- Hamad bin Ibrahim Al Mualla, ruler (1923–1929)
- Ahmad bin Rashid Al Mualla, ruler (1929–1981)

- Emirate of Fujairah –

- Hamad bin Abdullah Al Sharqi, ruler (1879–1936)
- Saif bin Hamad Al Sharqi, ruler (1936–1938)
- Mohammed bin Hamad Al Sharqi, ruler (1938–1975)

- Emirate of Ras Al Khaimah –

- Saqr bin Khalid Al Qasimi, ruler (1900–1914)
- Khalid bin Ahmad Al Qasimi, ruler (1914–1921)
- Sultan bin Salim Al Qasimi, ruler (1921–1948)
- Saqr bin Mohammed Al Qasimi, ruler (1948–2010)

Yemen: North

- North Yemen: Mutawakkilite Kingdom of Yemen

- Kings (complete list) –

- Yahya Muhammad Hamid ed-Din, King (1918–1948)
- Ahmad bin Yahya, King (1948–1962)

- Prime ministers (complete list) –

- Ibrahim bin Yahya Hamid al-Din, Prime minister (1948)
- Ali ibn Abdullah al-Wazir, Prime minister (1948)
- Hassan ibn Yahya, Prime minister (1948–1955)

Yemen: South

- Colony of Aden (complete list) –

British Colony, 1937–1963
For details see the United Kingdom under British Isles, Europe

- Upper Aulaqi Sheikhdom (complete list) –

- 'Amm Rassas ibn Farid al-Yaslami al-'Awlaqi, Amir (1890–1902)
- Muhsin ibn Farid al-Yaslami al-'Awlaqi, Amir (1902–1959)

- Upper Aulaqi Sultanate (complete list) –

- Salih ibn 'Abd Allah, Sultan (1887–1935)
- 'Awad ibn Salih al-'Awlaqi, Sultan (1935–1967)

- Wahidi Balhaf of Ba´l Haf and 'Azzan (complete list) –

- Salih ibn 'Abd Allah al-Wahidi, Sultan (1893–1904)
- Muhsin ibn Salih al-Wahidi (2nd time), Sultan (1904–1919)
- 'Ali ibn al-Husayn al-Wahidi, Sultan (1919–1948)
- 'Ali ibn Muhsin al-Wahidi (uncertain), Sultan (1948)
- Nasir ibn 'Abd Allah al-Wahidi, Sultan (1948–1967)

- Emirate of Beihan (complete list) –

- Muhsin, Amir (?–1903)
- Sharif Ahmad Muhsin Al Habieli, Amir (1903–1935)

- Emirate of Dhala (complete list) –

- Sha´if ibn Sayf al-'Amiri, Emir (1886–1911)
- Nasir ibn Sha'if al-'Amiri, Emir (1911–1920, 1928–1947)
- Haydara ibn Nasir al-'Amiri, Emir (1920–1928)
- 'Ali ibn 'Ali al-'Amiri, Emir (1947–1954)

- Wahidi Haban (complete list) –

- Nasir ibn Salih al-Wahidi, Sultan (1885–1919)
- al-Husayn ibn 'Ali al-Wahidi, Sultan (1919–?)

- Kathiri (complete list) –

- al-Mansur ibn Ghalib al-Kathir, Sultan (1880–1929)
- 'Ali ibn al-Mansur al-Kathir, Sultan (1929–1938)
- Dscha'far ibn al-Mansur al-Kathir, Sultan (1938–1949)
- al-Husain ibn 'Ali al-Kathir, Sultan (1949–1967)

- Sultanate of Lahej –

- Ahmad III ibn al-Fadl al-'Abdali, Sultan (1898–1914)
- 'Ali II ibn Ahmad al-'Abdali, Sultan (1914–1915)
- 'Abd al-Karim II ibn al-Fadl al-'Abdali, Sultan (1915–1947)
- al-Fadl V ibn 'Abd al-Karim al-'Abdali, Sultan (1947–1952)

- Mahra Sultanate –

- 'Ali ibn 'Abd Allah Afrar al-Mahri, Sultan (late-19th century–1907)
- 'Abd Allah ibn 'Isa Afrar al-Mahri, Sultan (1907–early-20th century)
- Ahmad ibn 'Abd Allah Afrar al-Mahri, Sultan (mid-20th century–1952)

- Lower Yafa –

- Abd Allah ibn Muhsin al-Afifi, ruler (1899–1916)
- Muhsin II ibn Ali al-Afifi, ruler (1916–1925)
- Aydarus ibn Muhsin al-Afifi, ruler (1925–1958)

- Upper Yafa –

- Qahtan ibn 'Umar ibn al-Husayn Al Harhara, Sultan (1895–1903)
- Salih ibn 'Umar ibn al-Husayn Al Harhara, Sultan (1903–1913, 1919–1927)
- 'Umar ibn Qahtan ibn 'Umar Al Harhara, Sultan (1913–1919)
- Umar ibn Salih ibn 'Umar Al Harhara, Sultan (1927–1948)
- Muhammad ibn Salih ibn 'Umar Al Harhara, Sultan (1948–1967)

== Europe ==
=== Europe: Balkans ===
Albania

- Independent Albania / Provisional Government

- President (complete list) –

- Ismail Kemal, President (1912–1914)

- Prime ministers (complete list) –

- Ismail Kemal, Prime minister (1912–1914)
- Fejzi Alizoti, Prime minister (1914)

- Principality of Albania

- President (complete list) –

- Wilhelm, Prince (1914), Prince in exile (1914–1925)
- Italian protectorate over Albania, 1917–1920

- Turhan Përmeti, Chairman of the Provisional Government (1918–1920)

- Sulejman Delvina, Chairman of the Provisional Government (1920)
- High Council of Regency, Head of State (1920–1925)
- Fan S. Noli, Acting for the High Council (1924)

- Prime ministers (complete list) –

- Turhan Përmeti, Prime minister (1914)
- Essad Pasha Toptani, Prime minister (1914–1916)
- Turhan Përmeti, Prime minister (1918–1920)
- Sulejman Delvina, Prime minister (1920)
- Iliaz Vrioni, Prime minister (1920–1921)
- Pandeli Evangjeli, Prime minister (1921)
- Qazim Koculi, Interim Prime minister (1921)
- Hasan Prishtina, Prime minister (1921)
- Idhomene Kosturi, Interim Prime minister (1921)
- Omer Pasha Vrioni II, Prime minister (1921)
- Xhafer Bej Ypi, Prime minister (1921–1922)
- Ahmet Zogu, Prime Minister (1922–1924)
- Shefqet Vërlaci, Prime Minister (1924)
- Iliaz Vrioni, Prime Minister (1924)
- Fan S. Noli, Prime Minister (1924)
- Iliaz Vrioni, Prime Minister (1924–1925)
- Ahmet Zogu, Prime minister (1925)

- Albanian Republic (complete list) –

- Ahmet Zogu (Zogu I), President (1925–1928), King (1928–1939)

- Albanian Kingdom (1928–1939)

- King (complete list) –

- Zogu I (Ahmet Zogu), President (1925–1928), King (1928–1939)

- Prime ministers (complete list) –

- Kostaq Kota, Prime minister (1928–1930)
- Pandeli Evangjeli, Prime minister (1930–1935)
- Mehdi Frashëri, Prime minister (1935–1936)
- Kostaq Kota, Prime minister (1936–1939)

- Italian protectorate of Albania (1939–1943)

- King (complete list) –

- Victor Emmanuel III, King (1939–1943)

- Prime ministers (complete list) –

- Shefqet Vërlaci, Prime minister (1939–1941)
- Mustafa Merlika-Kruja, Prime minister (1941–1943)
- Eqrem Libohova, Prime minister (1943)
- Maliq Bushati, Prime minister (1943)
- Eqrem Libohova, Prime minister (1943)

- German occupation of Albania

- King (complete list) –

- Mehdi Frashëri, Regent (1943–1944)

- Prime ministers (complete list) –

- Ibrahim Biçakçiu, Prime minister (1943)
- Mehdi Frashëri, Prime minister (1943)
- Rexhep Mitrovica, Prime minister (1943–1944)
- Fiqri Dine, Prime minister (1944)
- Ibrahim Biçakçiu, Prime minister (1944)

- People's Socialist Republic of Albania

- First Secretaries (complete list) –

- Enver Hoxha, First Secretary (1941–1985): Democratic Government of Albania (1944–1946)

- Chairman (complete list) –

- Omer Nishani, Chairman (1944–1953): Democratic Government of Albania (1944–1946)

- Prime ministers (complete list) –

- Enver Hoxha, Prime minister (1944–1954): Democratic Government of Albania (1944–1946)

Bulgaria

- Principality of Bulgaria

- Princes (complete list) –

- Ferdinand I, Prince (1887–1908), Tsar (1908–1918)

- Prime ministers (complete list) –

- Todor Ivanchov, Prime minister (1899–1901)
- Racho Petrov, Prime minister (1901)
- Petko Karavelov, Prime minister (1880–1881, 1884–1886, 1886, 1901–1902)
- Stoyan Danev, Prime minister (1902–1903)
- Racho Petrov, Prime minister (1903–1906)
- Dimitar Petkov, Prime minister (1906–1907)
- Dimitar Stanchov, Interim Prime minister (1907)
- Petar Gudev, Prime minister (1907–1908)

- Kingdom of Bulgaria

- Tsars (complete list) –

- Ferdinand I, Prince (1887–1908), Tsar (1908–1918)
- Boris III, Tsar (1918–1943)
- Simeon II, Tsar (1943–1946)

- Prime ministers (complete list) –

- Aleksandar Malinov, Prime minister (1908–1911)
- Ivan Evstratiev Geshov, Prime minister (1911–1913)
- Stoyan Danev, Prime minister (1913)
- Vasil Radoslavov, Prime minister (1886–1887, 1913–1918)
- Aleksandar Malinov, Prime minister (1918)
- Teodor Teodorov, Prime minister (1918–1919)
- Aleksandar Stamboliyski, Prime minister (1919–1923)
- Aleksandar Tsankov, Prime minister (1923–1926)
- Andrey Lyapchev, Prime minister (1926–1931)
- Aleksandar Malinov, Prime minister (1931)
- Nikola Mushanov, Prime minister (1931–1934)
- Kimon Georgiev, Prime minister (1934–1935)
- Pencho Zlatev, Prime minister (1935)
- Andrey Toshev, Prime minister (1935)
- Georgi Kyoseivanov, Prime minister (1935–1940)
- Bogdan Filov, Prime minister (1940–1943)
- Petur Gabrovski, Interim Prime minister (1943)
- Dobri Bozhilov, Prime minister (1943–1944)
- Ivan Ivanov Bagryanov, Prime minister (1944)
- Konstantin Muraviev, Prime minister (1944)
- Kimon Georgiev, Prime minister (1944–1946)

- People's Republic of Bulgaria

- General Secretary (complete list) –

- Georgi Dimitrov, General Secretary (1946–1949)
- Valko Chervenkov, General Secretary (1949–1954)

- Presidents (complete list) –

- Vasil Kolarov, Chairman of the Provisional Presidency of Bulgaria (1946–1947)
- Mincho Neychev, Chairman of the Presidium of the National Assembly (1947–1950)
- Georgi Damyanov, Chairman of the Presidium of the National Assembly (1950–1958)

- Prime ministers (complete list) –

- Georgi Dimitrov, Prime Minister (1946–1949)
- Vasil Kolarov, Prime Minister (1949–1950)
- Vulko Chervenkov, Prime Minister (1950–1956)

Greece

- Kingdom of Greece

- Monarchy (complete list) –

- George I, King (1863–1913)
- Constantine I, King (1913–1917)
- Alexander, King (1917–1920)
- Pavlos Kountouriotis, Regent (1920)
- Olga Constantinovna, Regent (1920)
- Constantine I, King (1920–1922)
- George II, King (1922–1924)

- Prime ministers (complete list) –

- Georgios Theotokis, Prime minister (1899–1901)
- Alexandros Zaimis, Prime minister (1897–1899, 1901–1902)
- Theodoros Deligiannis, Prime minister (1902–1903)
- Georgios Theotokis, Prime minister (1903)
- Dimitrios Rallis, Prime minister (1903)
- Georgios Theotokis, Prime minister (1903–1904)
- Theodoros Deligiannis, Prime minister (1904–1905)
- Dimitrios Rallis, Prime minister (1905)
- Georgios Theotokis, Prime minister (1905–1909)
- Dimitrios Rallis, Prime minister (1909)
- Kyriakoulis Mavromichalis, Prime minister (1909–1910)
- Stefanos Dragoumis, Prime minister (1910)
- Eleftherios Venizelos, Prime minister (1910–1915)
- Dimitrios Gounaris, Prime minister (1915)
- Eleftherios Venizelos, Prime minister (1915)
- Alexandros Zaimis, Prime minister (1915)
- Stefanos Skouloudis, Prime minister (1915–1916)
- Alexandros Zaimis, Prime minister (1916)
- Nikolaos Kalogeropoulos, Prime minister (1916)
- Spyridon Lambros, Prime minister (1916–1917)
- Alexandros Zaimis, Prime minister (1917)
- Eleftherios Venizelos, Prime minister (1917–1920)
- Dimitrios Rallis, Prime minister (1920–1921)
- Nikolaos Kalogeropoulos, Prime minister (1921)
- Dimitrios Gounaris, Prime minister (1921–1922)
- Nikolaos Stratos, Prime minister (1922)
- Petros Protopapadakis, Prime minister (1922)
- Nikolaos Triantafyllakos, Prime minister (1922)
- Anastasios Charalambis, Prime minister (1922)
- Sotirios Krokidas, Prime minister (1922)
- Stylianos Gonatas, Prime minister (1922–1924)
- Eleftherios Venizelos, Prime minister (1924)
- Georgios Kafantaris, Prime minister (1924)

- Cretan State –

Autonomous state of the Ottoman Empire, establishment by the Great Powers, 1898–1913
- High Commissioners

- Prince George of Greece, High Commissioner, (1898–1906)
- Alexandros Zaimis, High Commissioner, (1906–1911)

- Prime Ministers

- Eleftherios Venizelos, Prime Minister (1910)

- Second Hellenic Republic

- Presidents (complete list) –

- Pavlos Kountouriotis, President (1924–1926)
- Theodoros Pangalos, President (1926)
- Pavlos Kountouriotis, President (1926–1929)
- Alexandros Zaimis, President (1929–1935)

- Prime ministers (complete list) –

- Alexandros Papanastasiou, Prime minister (1924)
- Themistoklis Sofoulis, Prime minister (1924)
- Andreas Michalakopoulos, Prime minister (1924–1925)
- Theodoros Pangalos, Prime minister (1925–1926)
- Athanasios Eftaxias, Prime minister (1926)
- Georgios Kondylis, Caretaker Prime minister (1926)
- Alexandros Zaimis, Prime minister (1926–1928)
- Eleftherios Venizelos, Prime minister (1928–1932)
- Alexandros Papanastasiou, Prime minister (1932)
- Eleftherios Venizelos, Prime minister (1932)
- Panagis Tsaldaris, Prime minister (1932–1933)
- Eleftherios Venizelos, Prime minister (1933)
- Alexandros Othonaios, Interim Prime minister (1933)
- Panagis Tsaldaris, Prime minister (1933–1935)

- Kingdom of Greece: 4th of August Regime

- Monarchy (complete list) –

- Georgios Kondylis, Regent (1935–1944)
- George II, King (1935–1947)
- Damaskinos, Regent (1944–1946)
- Paul, King (1947–1964)

- Prime ministers (complete list) –

- Georgios Kondylis, Prime minister (1935)
- Konstantinos Demertzis, Prime minister (1935–1936)
- Ioannis Metaxas, Prime minister (1936–1941)
- Alexandros Koryzis, Prime minister (1941)
- Emmanouil Tsouderos, Prime minister (1941), government-in-exile Prime minister (1941–1944)
- Sofoklis Venizelos, government-in-exile Prime minister (1944)
- Evripidis Bakirtzis, head of government (1944) Mountain Government
- Alexandros Svolos, head of government (1944) Mountain Government
- Georgios Papandreou, Prime minister (1944–1945)
- Nikolaos Plastiras, Prime minister (1945)
- Petros Voulgaris, Prime minister (1945)
- Damaskinos of Athens, Prime minister (1945)
- Panagiotis Kanellopoulos, Prime minister (1945)
- Themistoklis Sofoulis, Prime minister (1945–1946)
- Panagiotis Poulitsas, Interim Prime minister (1946)
- Konstantinos Tsaldaris, Prime minister (1946–1947)
- Dimitrios Maximos, Prime minister (1947)
- Konstantinos Tsaldaris, Prime minister (1947)
- Themistoklis Sofoulis, Prime minister (1947–1949)
- Alexandros Diomidis, Prime minister (1949–1950)
- Ioannis Theotokis, caretaker Prime minister (1950)
- Sofoklis Venizelos, Prime minister (1950)
- Nikolaos Plastiras, Prime minister (1950)
- Sofoklis Venizelos, Prime minister (1950–1951)

Yugoslavia

Serbia & Yugoslavia

- Kingdom of Serbia / Yugoslavia: Kingdom of Serbs, Croats and Slovenes / Kingdom of Yugoslavia

- Monarchs (Serbia / Yugoslavia) –

- Alexander of Serbia, King (1889–1903)
- Peter I, King (1903–1921)
- Alexander of Yugoslavia, Prince Regent (1918–1921), King (1921–1934)
- Paul, Prince Regent (1934–1941)
- Peter II, King (1934–1945)

- Presidents of the ministry: Serbia (complete list) –

- Aleksa Jovanović, President of the ministry (1900–1901)
- Mihailo Vujić, President of the ministry (1901–1902)
- Petar Velimirović, President of the ministry (1902)
- Dimitrije Cincar-Marković, President of the ministry (1902–1903)
- Jovan Avakumović, President of the ministerial council (1903)
- Sava Grujić, Prime minister (1903–1904)
- Nikola Pašić, Prime minister (1904–1905)
- Ljubomir Stojanović, Prime minister (1905–1906)
- Sava Grujić, Prime minister (1906)
- Nikola Pašić, Prime minister (1906–1908)
- Petar Velimirović, Prime minister (1908–1909)
- Stojan Novaković, Prime minister (1909)
- Nikola Pašić, Prime minister (1909–1911)
- Milovan Milovanović, Prime minister (1911–1912)
- Marko Trifković, Prime minister (1912)
- Nikola Pašić, Prime minister (1912–1918)

- Prime ministers: Yugoslavia (complete list) –

- Nikola Pašić, Acting Prime minister (1918)
- Stojan Protić, Prime minister (1918–1919)
- Ljubomir Davidović, Prime minister (1919–1920)
- Stojan Protić, Prime minister (1920)
- Milenko Radomar Vesnić, Prime minister (1920–1921)
- Nikola Pašić, Prime minister (1921–1924)
- Ljubomir Davidović, Prime minister (1924)
- Nikola Pašić, Prime minister (1924–1926)
- Nikola Uzunović, Prime minister (1926–1927)
- Velimir Vukićević, Prime minister (1927–1928)
- Anton Korošec, Prime minister (1928–1929)
- Petar Živković, Prime minister (1929–1932)
- Vojislav Marinković, Prime minister (1932)
- Milan Srškić, Prime minister (1932–1934)
- Nikola Uzunović, Prime minister (1934)
- Bogoljub Jevtić, Prime minister (1934–1935)
- Milan Stojadinović, Prime minister (1935–1939)
- Dragiša Cvetković, Prime minister (1939–1941)

- Yugoslavia: Democratic Federal Yugoslavia

- Chairman of the Presidency of the National Assembly/ AVNOJ (complete list) –

- Ivan Ribar, Chairman of the Presidency (1945–1953)

- Monarchs (complete list) –

- Peter II, King (1934–1945)

- Prime ministers (complete list) –

- Josip Broz Tito, Prime minister (1941–1963)

- Yugoslavia: Socialist Federal Republic of Yugoslavia

- General Secretary (complete list) –

- Josip Broz Tito, General Secretary (1945–1964), President of the Presidium (1964–1980)

- Presidents (complete list) –

- Ivan Ribar, Chairman of the Presidency (1945–1953)

- Prime ministers (complete list) –

- Josip Broz Tito, Prime minister (1941–1963)

Croatia

- Kingdom of Croatia (Habsburg) (complete list) –

part of the Habsburg monarchy, also part of the Lands of the Hungarian Crown
- Franz Joseph, King (1848–1916)

- Kingdom of Croatia-Slavonia

part of the Austrian Empire

- Kings (complete list) –

- Franz Joseph, King (1848–1916)
- Charles I, King (1916–1918)

- Bans (complete list) –

- Karoly Khuen-Héderváry, Ban (1883–1903)
- Teodor Pejačević, Ban (1907)
- Aleksandar Rakodczaj, Ban (1907–1908)
- Pavao Rauch, Ban (1908–1910)
- Nikola Tomašić, Ban (1910–1912)
- Slavko Cuvaj, Ban (1912–1913)
- Ivan Skerlecz, Ban (1913–1917)
- Antun Mihalović, Ban (1917–1919)

- Free State of Fiume –

- Riccardo Zanella, President (1921–1922)
- Giovanni Giuriati, President (1922–1923)
- Gaetano Giardino, Military Governor (1923–1924)

- Independent State of Croatia

Puppet state of Nazi Germany and Italy within occupied Yugoslavia
- Heads of State (complete list) –

- Tomislav II, King (1941–1943)
- Ante Pavelić, Poglavnik (1943–1945)

- Heads of Government (complete list) –

- Ante Pavelić, Prime Minister/President of the Government (1941–1943)
- Nikcorrectedola Mandić, Prime Minister/President of the Government (1943–1945)

Kosovo

- Kosovo Vilayet (complete list) –

administrative division of the Ottoman Empire, under Austro-Hungarian occupation 1878–1913
- Reshad Bey Pasha, Governor (1900–1902)
- Abeddin Pasha, Governor (1902–1903)
- Shakir Pasha Numan, Governor (1903–1904)
- Mahmud Shevket Pasha, Governor (1905–1907)
- Hadi Pasha, Governor (1908)
- Mazhar Bey Pasha, Governor (1909–1910)
- Halil Bey Pasha, Governor (1911)
- Ghalib Pasha, Governor (1912)

Montenegro

- Principality of Montenegro

- Monarchs (complete list) –

- Nikola I, Sovereign prince (1860–1910), King (1910–1918)

- Presidents of the ministerial council (complete list) –

- Božo Petrović-Njegoš, President (1879–1905)
- Lazar Mijušković, President (1905–1906)
- Marko Radulović, President (1906–1907)
- Andrija Radović, President (1907)
- Lazar Tomanović, President (1907–1910)

- Kingdom of Montenegro

- Monarchs (complete list) –

- Nikola I, Sovereign prince (1860–1910), King (1910–1918)

- Presidents of the ministerial council (complete list) –

- Lazar Tomanović, President (1910–1912)
- Mitar Martinović, President (1912–1913)
- Janko Vukotić, President (1913–1915)
- Milo Matanović, President (1915–1916)
- Lazar Mijušković, President in-exile (1916)
- Andrija Radović, President in-exile (1916–1917)
- Milo Matanović, President in-exile (1917)
- Evgenije Popović, President in-exile (1917–1919)
- Anto Gvozdenović, President in-exile (1919–1921)
- Jovan Plamenac, President in-exile (1921–1922)
- Milutin Vučinić, President in-exile (1922)
- Anto Gvozdenović, President in-exile (1922)

=== Europe: Baltic states ===
Estonia

- Estonian Provisional Government

- Heads of state (complete list) –

- Konstantin Päts, Chairman of the Council of Ministers (1918), Prime minister (1918–1919)
- Otto Strandman, Prime minister (1919)

- Republic of Estonia

- Heads of state (complete list) –

- Ants Piip, State Elder (1920–1921)
- Konstantin Päts, State Elder (1921–1922)
- Juhan Kukk, State Elder (1922–1923)
- Konstantin Päts, State Elder (1923–1924)
- Friedrich Akel, State Elder (1924)
- Jüri Jaakson, State Elder (1924–1925)
- Jaan Teemant, State Elder (1925–1927)
- Jaan Tõnisson, State Elder (1927–1928)
- August Rei, State Elder (1928–1929)
- Otto Strandman, State Elder (1929–1931)
- Konstantin Päts, State Elder (1931–1932)
- Jaan Teemant, State Elder (1932)
- Kaarel Eenpalu, State Elder (1932)
- Konstantin Päts, State Elder (1932–1933)
- Jaan Tõnisson, State Elder (1933)
- Konstantin Päts, State Elder (1933–1934)
- Prime ministers in Duties of the State Elder (1934–1937)
- Konstantin Päts, President-Regent (1937–1938)
- Konstantin Päts, President (1938–1940)

- Prime ministers (complete list) –

- Otto Strandman, Prime minister (1919)
- Jaan Tõnisson, Prime minister (1919–1920)
- Ado Birk, Prime minister (1920)
- Jaan Tõnisson, Prime minister (1920)
- Ants Piip, Prime minister (1920)
- Konstantin Päts, Prime minister (1934–1937)
- Kaarel Eenpalu, Prime minister (1938–1939)
- Jüri Uluots, Prime minister (1939–1945)
- Otto Tief, Prime minister (1945–1963)

Latvia

- Latvian Socialist Soviet Republic –

- Pēteris Stučka, Chairman (1918–1920)

- Republic of Latvia

- Presidents (complete list) –

- Jānis Čakste, Acting President (1918–1922), President (1922–1927)
- Gustavs Zemgals, President (1927–1930)
- Alberts Kviesis, President (1930–1936)
- Kārlis Ulmanis, President (1936–1940)
- Kārlis Ulmanis, President (1936–1940)

- Prime ministers (complete list) –

- Kārlis Ulmanis, Prime minister (1918–1921)
- Zigfrīds Anna Meierovics, Prime minister (1921–1923)
- Jānis Pauļuks, Prime minister (1923)
- Zigfrīds Anna Meierovics, Prime minister (1923–1924)
- Voldemārs Zāmuēls, Prime minister (1924)
- Hugo Celmiņš, Prime minister (1924–1925)
- Kārlis Ulmanis, Prime minister (1925–1926)
- Arturs Alberings, Prime minister (1926)
- Marģers Skujenieks, Prime minister (1926–1928)
- Pēteris Juraševskis, Prime minister (1928)
- Hugo Celmiņš, Prime minister (1928–1931)
- Kārlis Ulmanis, Prime minister (1931)
- Marģers Skujenieks, Prime minister (1931–1933)
- Ādolfs Bļodnieks, Prime minister (1933–1934)
- Kārlis Ulmanis, Prime minister (1934–1940)

Lithuania

- Kingdom of Lithuania (1918) –

- Wilhelm Karl: Mindaugas II, King-elect (1918)

- Republic of Central Lithuania –

Puppet state of the Second Polish Republic
- Lucjan Żeligowski, leader (1920–1922)

- Republic of Lithuania

- Presidents (complete list) –

- Antanas Smetona, President (1919–1920)
- Aleksandras Stulginskis, President (1920–1926)
- Kazys Grinius, President (1926)
- Jonas Staugaitis, Acting President (1926)
- Aleksandras Stulginskis, Acting President (1926)
- Antanas Smetona, President (1926–1940)
- Antanas Merkys, de facto acting president (1940)
- Justas Paleckis, Acting president (1940)

- Prime ministers (complete list) –

- Augustinas Voldemaras, Prime minister (1918)
- Mykolas Sleževičius, Prime minister (1918–1919)
- Pranas Dovydaitis, Prime minister (1919)
- Mykolas Sleževičius, Prime minister (1919)
- Ernestas Galvanauskas, Prime minister (1919–1920)
- Kazys Grinius, Prime minister (1920–1922)
- Ernestas Galvanauskas, Prime minister (1922–1924)
- Antanas Tumėnas, Prime minister (1924–1925)
- Vytautas Petrulis, Prime minister (1925)
- Leonas Bistras, Prime minister (1925–1926)
- Mykolas Sleževičius, Prime minister (1926)
- Augustinas Voldemaras, Prime minister (1926–1929)
- Juozas Tūbelis, Prime minister (1929–1938)
- Vladas Mironas, Prime minister (1938–1939)
- Jonas Černius, Prime minister (1939)
- Antanas Merkys, Prime minister (1939–1940)

=== Europe: British and Ireland ===
Ireland

- Irish Free State

- Monarchs (complete list) –

- George V, King (1922–1936)
- Edward VIII, King (1936)
- George VI, King (1936–1937)

- Presidents of the Executive Council (complete list) –

- W. T. Cosgrave, President of the Executive Council (1922–1932)
- Éamon de Valera, President of the Executive Council (1932–1937)

- Republic of Ireland

- Presidents (complete list) –

- Douglas Hyde, President (1938–1945)
- Seán T. O'Kelly, President (1945–1959)

- Taoiseachs (complete list) –

- Éamon de Valera, Taoiseach (1937–1948)
- John A. Costello, Taoiseach (1948–1951)

United Kingdom

- United Kingdom of Great Britain and Ireland

- Monarchs (complete list) –

- Victoria, Queen (1837–1901)
- Edward VII, King (1901–1910)
- George V, King (1910–1936)

- Prime ministers (complete list) –

- Robert Gascoyne-Cecil, Prime minister (1895–1902)
- Arthur Balfour, Prime minister (1902–1905)
- Henry Campbell-Bannerman, Prime minister (1905–1908)
- H. H. Asquith, Prime minister (1908–1916)
- David Lloyd George, Prime minister (1916–1922)
- Bonar Law, Prime minister (1922)

- United Kingdom of Great Britain and Northern Ireland

- Monarchs (complete list) –

- George V, King (1910–1936)
- Edward VIII, King (1936)
- George VI, King (1936–1952)

- Prime ministers (complete list) –

- Bonar Law, Prime minister (1922–1923)
- Stanley Baldwin, Prime minister (1923–1924)
- Ramsay MacDonald, Prime minister (1924)
- Stanley Baldwin, Prime minister (1924–1929)
- Ramsay MacDonald, Prime minister (1929–1935)
- Stanley Baldwin, Prime minister (1935–1937)
- Neville Chamberlain, Prime minister (1937–1940)
- Winston Churchill, Prime minister (1940–1945)
- Clement Attlee, Prime minister (1945–1951)

=== Europe: Central ===
Austria

- Austria-Hungary: Austrian Empire and Kingdom of Hungary

- Emperor-Kings (Austria / Hungary) –

- Franz Joseph I, Emperor (1848–1916)
- Charles I & IV, Emperor (1916–1918)

- Minister-presidents of Austria (complete list) –

- Ernest von Koerber, Ministers-President (1900–1904)
- Paul Gautsch von Frankenthurn, Ministers-President (1904–1906)
- Konrad of Hohenlohe-Schillingsfürst, Ministers-President (1906)
- Max Wladimir von Beck, Ministers-President (1906–1908)
- Richard von Bienerth-Schmerling, Ministers-President (1908–1911)
- Paul Gautsch von Frankenthurn, Ministers-President (1911)
- Karl von Stürgkh, Ministers-President (1911–1916)
- Ernest von Koerber, Ministers-President (1916)
- Heinrich Clam-Martinic, Ministers-President (1916–1917)
- Ernst Seidler von Feuchtenegg, Ministers-President (1917–1918)
- Max Hussarek von Heinlein, Ministers-President (1918)
- Heinrich Lammasch, Ministers-President (1918)

- Prime Ministers of Hungary (complete list) –

- Kálmán Széll, Prime Minister (1899–1903)
- Károly Khuen-Héderváry, Prime Minister (1903)
- István Tisza, Prime Minister (1903–1905)
- Géza Fejérváry, Prime Minister (1905–1906)
- Sándor Wekerle, Prime Minister (1906–1910)
- Károly Khuen-Héderváry, Prime Minister (1910–1912)
- László Lukács, Prime Minister (1912–1913)
- István Tisza, Prime Minister (1913–1917)
- Móric Esterházy, Prime Minister (1917)
- Sándor Wekerle, Prime Minister (1917–1918)
- János Hadik, Prime Minister (1918)
- Mihály Károlyi, Prime Minister (1918)

- Habsburg monarchy (complete list) –

Habsburg-Lorraine monarchs ruled under numerous simultaneous titles

- Francis Joseph I, (1848–1916)
- Karl I, (1916–1918)

- Republic of German-Austria

- President (complete list) –

- Karl Seitz, President (1919)

- Chancellor (complete list) –

- Karl Renner, Chancellor (1918–1919)

- First Austrian Republic/ Federal State of Austria

- Federal Presidents (complete list) –

- Karl Seitz, President (1919–1920)
- Michael Hainisch, President (1920–1928)
- Wilhelm Miklas, President (1928–1938)

- Chancellors (complete list) –

- Karl Renner, Chancellor (1919–1920)
- Michael Mayr, Chancellor (1920–1921)
- Johann Schober, Chancellor (1921–1922)
- Walter Breisky, Acting Chancellor (1922)
- Johann Schober, Chancellor (1922)
- Ignaz Seipel, Chancellor (1922–1924)
- Rudolf Ramek, Chancellor (1924–1926)
- Ignaz Seipel, Chancellor (1926–1929)
- Ernst Streeruwitz, Chancellor (1929)
- Johann Schober, Chancellor (1929–1930)
- Carl Vaugoin, Chancellor (1930)
- Otto Ender, Chancellor (1930–1931)
- Karl Buresch, Chancellor (1931–1932)
- Engelbert Dollfuss, Chancellor (1932–1934)
- Kurt Schuschnigg, Chancellor (1934–1938)
- Arthur Seyss-Inquart, Chancellor (1938)

- Allied-occupied Austria

- American zone High Commissioners (complete list) –

- Mark W. Clark, High Commissioner (1945–1947)
- Geoffrey Keyes, High Commissioner (1947–1950)
- Walter J. Donnelly, High Commissioner (1950–1952)

- British zone High Commissioners (complete list) –

- Richard McCreery, High Commissioner (1945–1946)
- James Steele, High Commissioner (1946–1947)
- Alexander Galloway, High Commissioner (1947–1950)
- John Winterton, High Commissioner (1950)
- Harold Caccia, High Commissioner (1950–1954)

- French zone High Commissioners (complete list) –

- Antoine Béthouart, High Commissioner (1945–1955)

- Soviet zone Commanders (complete list) –

- Fyodor Tolbukhin, Military commander (1945)
- Ivan Konev, High Commissioner (1945–1946)
- Vladimir Kurasov, High Commissioner (1946–1949)
- Vladimir Petrovich Sviridov, High Commissioner (1949–1953)

- Republic of Austria

- Federal Presidents (complete list) –

- Karl Renner, President (1945–1950)

- Chancellors (complete list) –

- Karl Renner, Chancellor (1945)
- Leopold Figl, Chancellor (1945–1953)

Czechoslovakia

- Kingdom of Bohemia (complete list) –

- Franz Joseph I, King (1848–1916)
- Charles III, King (1916–1918)

- Czechoslovakia: First Republic

- Presidents (complete list) –

- Tomáš Garrigue Masaryk, President (1918–1935)
- Edvard Beneš, President (1935–1938)

- Prime ministers (complete list) –

- Karel Kramář, Prime minister (1918–1919)
- Vlastimil Tusar, Prime Minister (1919–1920)
- Jan Černý, Prime Minister (1920–1921)
- Edvard Beneš, Prime Minister (1921–1922)
- Antonín Švehla, Prime Minister (1922–1926)
- Jan Černý, Prime Minister (1926)
- Antonín Švehla, Prime Minister (1926–1929)
- František Udržal, Prime Minister (1929–1932)
- Jan Malypetr, Prime Minister (1932–1935)
- Milan Hodža, Prime Minister (1935–1938)
- Jan Syrový, Prime Minister (1938)

- Czechoslovakia: Second Republic

- Presidents (complete list) –

- Emil Hácha, President (1938–1939)

- Prime ministers (complete list) –

- Jan Syrový, Prime Minister (1938)
- Rudolf Beran, Prime Minister (1938–1939)

- German occupation of Czechoslovakia

- Prime ministers (complete list) –

- Rudolf Beran, Acting Prime Minister (1938–1939)
- Alois Eliáš, Prime Minister (1939–1941)
- Jaroslav Krejčí, Prime Minister (1942–1945)
- Richard Bienert, Prime Minister (1945)

- Protectorate of Bohemia and Moravia

Nazi German Protectorate, 1939–1945
- State President (complete list) –

- Emil Hácha, State President (1939–1945)

- Prime ministers (complete list) –

- Rudolf Beran, Acting Prime minister (1939)
- Alois Eliáš, Prime minister (1939–1942)
- Jaroslav Krejčí, Prime minister (1941–1945)
- Richard Bienert, Prime minister (1945)

- First Slovak Republic, Nazi client state

- Prime ministers (complete list) –

- Jozef Tiso, Prime Minister (1939)
- Vojtech Tuka, Prime Minister (1939–1944)
- Štefan Tiso, Prime Minister (1944–1945)

- Czechoslovakia: Third Republic

- Presidents (complete list) –

- Edvard Beneš, President (1945–1948)

- Prime ministers (complete list) –

- Zdeněk Fierlinger, Prime Minister (1945–1946)
- Klement Gottwald, Prime Minister (1946–1948)

- Czechoslovak Socialist Republic

- General Secretaries (complete list) –

- Klement Gottwald, General Secretary (1948–1953)

- Presidents (complete list) –

- Klement Gottwald, President (1948–1953)

- Prime ministers (complete list) –

- Antonín Zápotocký, Prime Minister (1948–1953)

Germany: Small states

Bavarian

- Kingdom of Bavaria (complete list) –

- Otto, King (1886–1913)
- Ludwig III, King (1913–1918)

Prussia

- Kingdom of Prussia (complete list) –

- William II, Emperor (1888–1918), King (1888–1918)

Upper Rhenish

- Principality of Waldeck and Pyrmont (complete list) –

- Friedrich, Prince (1893–1918)

Lower Saxon

- Kingdom of Saxony (complete list) –

- Albert, King (1873–1902)
- George, King (1902–1904)
- Frederick Augustus III, King (1904–1918)

- Duchy of Brunswick (complete list) –

- Albert of Prussia, Regent (1884–1906)
- John Albert of Mecklenburg, Regent (1906–1913)
- Ernest Augustus, Duke (1913–1918)

- Free City of Lübeck (complete list) –

- Wilhelm Brehmer, Mayor (1901–1902)
- Heinrich Klug, Mayor (1903–1904)
- Johann Georg Eschenburg, Mayor (1905–1906)
- Ernst Christian Johannes Schön, Mayor (1907–1908)
- Johann Georg Eschenburg, Mayor (1909–1916)
- Emil Ferdinand Fehling, Mayor (1917–1920)
- Johann Martin Andreas Neumann, Mayor (1920–1926)
- Paul Löwigt, Mayor (1926–1933)
- Otto-Heinrich Drechsler, Mayor (1933–1937)

- Grand Duchy of Mecklenburg-Schwerin (complete list) –

- John Albert, Regent (1897–1901)
- Frederick Francis IV, Grand Duke (1897–1918)

- Grand Duchy of Mecklenburg-Strelitz (complete list) –

- Frederick William II, Grand Duke (1860–1904)
- Adolphus Frederick V, Grand Duke (1904–1914)
- Adolphus Frederick VI, Grand Duke (1914–1918)

- Grand Duchy of Oldenburg (complete list) –

- Frederick Augustus II, Grand Duke (1900–1918)

Upper Saxon

- Duchy of Anhalt (complete list) –

- Frederick II, Duke (1904–1918)
- Eduard, Duke (1918)
- Joachim Ernest, Duke (1918)

- Saxe-Altenburg/Saxe-Hildburghausen (complete list) –

- Ernst I, Duke (1853–1908)
- Ernst II, Duke (1908–1918)

- Saxe-Meiningen (complete list) –

- Georg II, Duke (1866–1914)
- Bernhard III, Duke (1914–1918)

- Saxe-Weimar-Eisenach (complete list) –

- Charles Alexander, Grand Duke (1853–1901)
- William Ernest, Grand Duke (1901–1918)

- Saxe-Coburg and Gotha (complete list) –

- Charles Edward, Duke (1900–1918)

Swabian

- Grand Duchy of Baden (complete list) –

- Frederick I, Regent (1852–1856), Grand Duke (1856–1907)
- Frederick II, Grand Duke (1907–1918)

- Weingarten Abbey (complete list) –

- Anselm Ritter, Prince-abbot (1784–1803)

- Kingdom of Württemberg (complete list) –

- William II, King (1891–1918)

Germany: Unified states

- German Empire

- Emperor (complete list) –

- Wilhelm II, Emperor (1888–1918)

- Chancellors (complete list) –

- Bernhard von Bülow, Chancellor (1900–1909)
- Theobald von Bethmann Hollweg, Chancellor (1909–1917)
- Georg Michaelis, Chancellor (1917)
- Georg von Hertling, Chancellor (1917–1918)
- Maximilian of Baden, Chancellor (1918)
- Friedrich Ebert, Revolutionary period Chancellor (1918–1919)

- Weimar Republic of Germany

- Presidents (complete list) –

- Friedrich Ebert, President (1919–1925)
- Paul von Hindenburg, President (1925–1934)

- Chancellors (complete list) –

- Philipp Scheidemann, Chancellor (1919)
- Gustav Bauer, Chancellor (1919–1920)
- Hermann Müller, Chancellor (1920)
- Constantin Fehrenbach, Chancellor (1920–1921)
- Joseph Wirth, Chancellor (1921–1922)
- Wilhelm Cuno, Chancellor (1922–1923)
- Gustav Stresemann, Chancellor (1923)
- Wilhelm Marx, Chancellor (1923–1925)
- Hans Luther, Chancellor (1925–1926)
- Wilhelm Marx, Chancellor (1926–1928)
- Hermann Müller, Chancellor (1928–1930)
- Heinrich Brüning, Chancellor (1930–1932)
- Franz von Papen, Chancellor (1932)
- Kurt von Schleicher, Chancellor (1932–1933)

- Nazi Germany

- Heads of state (complete list) –

- Paul von Hindenburg, President (1925–1934)
- Adolf Hitler, Führer (1934–1945)
- Karl Dönitz, President (1945)

- Chancellors (complete list) –

- Adolf Hitler, Chancellor (1933–1945)
- Joseph Goebbels, Chancellor (1945)
- Lutz Graf Schwerin von Krosigk, Leading Minister (1945)

- Allied-occupied Germany

- Commanders (complete list) –

- Dwight D. Eisenhower, Military governor (1945)
- George S. Patton, acting Military governor (1945)
- Joseph T. McNarney, Military governor (1945–1947)
- Lucius D. Clay, Military governor (1947–1949)
- Clarence R. Huebner, acting Military governor (1949)
- John J. McCloy, High Commissioner (1949–1952)

- Commanders (complete list) –

- Bernard Montgomery, Military governor (1945–1946)
- Sholto Douglas, Military governor (1946–1947)
- Brian Robertson, Military governor (1947–1949), High Commissioner (1949–1950)
- Ivone Kirkpatrick, High Commissioner (1950–1953)

- Commanders (complete list) –

- Jean de Lattre de Tassigny, Military commander (1945)
- Marie-Pierre Kœnig, Military governor (1945–1949)
- André François-Poncet, High Commissioner (1949–1955)

- Commanders (complete list) –

- Georgy Zhukov, Military commander (1945)
- Konstantin Rokossovsky, Military commander (1945)
- Ivan Konev, Military commander (1945)
- Georgy Zhukov, Chief administrator (1945–1946)
- Vasily Sokolovsky, Chief administrator (1946–1949)
- Vasily Chuikov, Chief administrator (1949), Chairman of Control Commission (1949–1953)

- East Germany

- General Secretaries (complete list) –

- Wilhelm Pieck, Joint Chairmen (1946–1950)
- Otto Grotewohl, Joint Chairmen (1946–1950)
- Walter Ulbricht, General Secretary (1950–1953), First Secretary (1953–1971)

- Heads of state (complete list) –

- Wilhelm Pieck, President (1949–1960)

- Chairman of the Council of Ministers (complete list) –

- Otto Grotewohl, Chairman (1949–1964)

- West Germany

- Presidents (complete list) –

- Karl Arnold, Acting President (1949)
- Theodor Heuss, President (1949–1959)

- Chancellors (complete list) –

- Konrad Adenauer, Chancellor (1945–1963)

Hungary

- First Hungarian Republic

- Presidents (complete list) –

- Mihály Károlyi, President (1919)

- Prime Ministers of Hungary (complete list) –

- Mihály Károlyi, Prime Minister (1919)
- Dénes Berinkey, Prime Minister (1919)

- Hungarian Soviet Republic

- Heads of State (complete list) –

- Sándor Garbai, Chairman of the Hungarian Central Executive Council (1919)
- Gyula Peidl, Acting Head of State (1919)

- Prime Ministers of Hungary (complete list) –

- Sándor Garbai, Prime Minister (1919)
- Gyula Peidl, Prime Minister (1919)
- opposed by Gyula Károlyi, Prime Minister (1919)
- Dezső Pattantyús-Ábrahám, Prime Minister (1919)

- Hungarian Republic (1919–1920)

- Heads of state (complete list) –

- Joseph August, Regent (1919)
- István Friedrich, Acting Head of state (1919)
- Károly Huszár, Acting Head of state (1919–1920)

- Prime ministers (complete list) –

- István Friedrich, Prime minister (1919)
- Károly Huszár, Prime minister (1919–1920)

- Kingdom of Hungary (1920–1946)

- Regents (complete list) –

- Miklós Horthy, Regent (1920–1944)
- Ferenc Szálasi, Leader of the Nation (1944–1945)
- High National Council (1945–1946)

- Prime ministers (complete list) –

- Sándor Simonyi-Semadam, Prime minister (1920)
- Pál Teleki, Prime minister (1920–1921)
- István Bethlen, Prime minister (1921–1931)
- Gyula Károlyi, Prime minister (1931–1932)
- Gyula Gömbös, Prime minister (1932–1936)
- Kálmán Darányi, Prime minister (1936–1938)
- Béla Imrédy, Prime minister (1938–1939)
- Pál Teleki, Prime minister (1939–1941)
- Ferenc Keresztes-Fischer, Acting Prime minister (1941)
- László Bárdossy, Prime minister (1941–1942)
- Ferenc Keresztes-Fischer, Acting Prime minister (1942)
- Miklós Kállay, Prime minister (1942–1944)
- Döme Sztójay, Prime minister (1944)
- Géza Lakatos, Prime minister (1944)
- Ferenc Szálasi, de facto Prime minister (1944–1945)
- Béla Miklós, Prime minister (1945)
- Zoltán Tildy, Prime minister (1945–1946)

- Government of National Unity: Hungary (complete list) –

Puppet government of Nazi Germany, 1944–1945
- Ferenc Szálasi, Leader of the Nation (1944–1945)

- Second Hungarian Republic

- Presidents (complete list) –

- Zoltán Tildy, President (1946–1948)
- Árpád Szakasits, President (1948–1949)

- Prime ministers (complete list) –

- Ferenc Nagy, Prime minister (1946–1947)
- Lajos Dinnyés, Prime minister (1947–1948)
- István Dobi, Prime minister (1948–1949)

- Hungarian People's Republic

- General Secretaries (complete list) –

- Mátyás Rákosi, General Secretary (1948–1956)

- Chairmen of the Presidential Council (complete list) –

- Árpád Szakasits, Chairman (1949–1950)
- Sándor Rónai, Chairman (1950–1952)

- Prime ministers (complete list) –

- István Dobi, Prime minister (1949–1952)

Liechtenstein

- Liechtenstein

- Sovereign Princes (complete list) –

- Johann II, Prince (1858–1929)
- Franz I, Prince (1929–1938)
- Franz Josef II, Prince (1938–1989)

- Heads of government (complete list) –

- Carl von In der Maur, Governor (1897–1913)
- Leopold Freiherr von Imhof, Governor (1914–1918)
- Martin Ritter, Chairman of the Provisional Executive Committee (1918)
- Prince Karl Aloys, Governor (1918–1920)
- Josef Peer, Governor (1920–1921)
- Josef Ospelt, Governor (1921), Prime Minister (1922)
- Alfons Feger, acting Prime Minister (1922)
- Felix Gubelmann, acting Prime Minister (1922)
- Prince Alfred Roman, acting Prime Minister (1928)
- Gustav Schädler, Prime Minister (1922–1928)
- Josef Hoop, Prime Minister (1928–1945)
- Alexander Frick, Prime Minister (1945–1962)

Poland

- Lemko Republic –

- Jaroslav Kacmarcyk, President (1918–1920)

- Second Polish Republic

- Presidents (complete list) –

- Józef Piłsudski, Chief of State (1918–1922)
- Gabriel Narutowicz, President (1922)
- Maciej Rataj, Acting President (1922)
- Stanisław Wojciechowski, President (1922–1926)
- Maciej Rataj, Acting President (1926)
- Ignacy Mościcki, President (1926–1939)

- Prime ministers (complete list) –

- Ignacy Daszyński, Prime minister (1918)
- Jędrzej Moraczewski, Prime minister (1918–1919)
- Ignacy Jan Paderewski, Prime minister (1919)
- Leopold Skulski, Prime minister (1919–1920)
- Władysław Grabski, Prime minister (1920)
- Wincenty Witos, Prime minister (1920–1921)
- Antoni Ponikowski, Prime minister (1921–1922)
- Artur Śliwiński, Prime minister (1922)
- Julian Nowak, Prime minister (1922)
- Władysław Sikorski, Prime minister (1922–1923)
- Wincenty Witos, Prime minister (1923)
- Władysław Grabski, Prime minister (1923–1925)
- Aleksander Skrzyński, Prime minister (1925–1926)
- Wincenty Witos, Prime minister (1926)
- Kazimierz Bartel, Prime minister (1926)
- Józef Piłsudski, Prime minister (1926–1928)
- Kazimierz Bartel, Prime minister (1928–1929)
- Kazimierz Świtalski, Prime minister (1929)
- Kazimierz Bartel, Prime minister (1929–1930)
- Walery Sławek, Prime minister (1930)
- Józef Piłsudski, Prime minister (1930)
- Walery Sławek, Prime minister (1930–1931)
- Aleksander Prystor, Prime minister (1931–1933)
- Janusz Jędrzejewicz, Prime minister (1933–1934)
- Leon Kozłowski, Prime minister (1934–1935)
- Walery Sławek, Prime minister (1935)
- Marian Zyndram-Kościałkowski, Prime minister (1935–1936)
- Felicjan Sławoj Składkowski, Prime minister (1936–1939)

- Free City of Danzig

Free City under League of Nations protection, 1920–1939

- People's Republic of Poland

- Party leaders (complete list) –

- Bolesław Bierut, General Secretary (1948–1956)

- Chairman of the Council of State (complete list) –

- Bolesław Bierut, President (1947–1952)

- Prime ministers (complete list) –

- Edward Osóbka-Morawski, Prime minister (1944–1947)
- Józef Cyrankiewicz, Prime minister (1947–1952)

Switzerland

- Switzerland (complete list) –

- Ernst Brenner, President of the Confederation (1901)
- Josef Zemp, President of the Confederation (1902)
- Adolf Deucher, President of the Confederation (1903)
- Robert Comtesse, President of the Confederation (1904)
- Marc-Emile Ruchet, President of the Confederation (1905)
- Ludwig Forrer, President of the Confederation (1906)
- Eduard Müller, President of the Confederation (1907)
- Ernst Brenner, President of the Confederation (1908)
- Adolf Deucher, President of the Confederation (1909)
- Robert Comtesse, President of the Confederation (1910)
- Marc-Emile Ruchet, President of the Confederation (1911)
- Ludwig Forrer, President of the Confederation (1912)
- Eduard Müller, President of the Confederation (1913)
- Arthur Hoffmann, President of the Confederation (1914)
- Giuseppe Motta, President of the Confederation (1915)
- Camille Decoppet, President of the Confederation (1916)
- Edmund Schulthess, President of the Confederation (1917)
- Felix Calonder, President of the Confederation (1918)
- Gustave Ador, President of the Confederation (1919)
- Giuseppe Motta, President of the Confederation (1920)
- Edmund Schulthess, President of the Confederation (1921)
- Robert Haab, President of the Confederation (1922)
- Karl Scheurer, President of the Confederation (1923)
- Ernest Chuard, President of the Confederation (1924)
- Jean-Marie Musy, President of the Confederation (1925)
- Heinrich Häberlin, President of the Confederation (1926)
- Giuseppe Motta, President of the Confederation (1927)
- Edmund Schulthess, President of the Confederation (1928)
- Robert Haab, President of the Confederation (1929)
- Jean-Marie Musy, President of the Confederation (1930)
- Heinrich Häberlin, President of the Confederation (1931)
- Giuseppe Motta, President of the Confederation (1932)
- Edmund Schulthess, President of the Confederation (1933)
- Marcel Pilet-Golaz, President of the Confederation (1934)
- Rudolf Minger, President of the Confederation (1935)
- Albert Meyer, President of the Confederation (1936)
- Giuseppe Motta, President of the Confederation (1937)
- Johannes Baumann, President of the Confederation (1938)
- Philipp Etter, President of the Confederation (1939)
- Marcel Pilet-Golaz, President of the Confederation (1940)
- Ernst Wetter, President of the Confederation (1941)
- Philipp Etter, President of the Confederation (1942)
- Enrico Celio, President of the Confederation (1943)
- Walther Stampfli, President of the Confederation (1944)
- Eduard von Steiger, President of the Confederation (1945)
- Karl Kobelt, President of the Confederation (1946)
- Philipp Etter, President of the Confederation (1947)
- Enrico Celio, President of the Confederation (1948)
- Ernst Nobs, President of the Confederation (1949)
- Max Petitpierre, President of the Confederation (1950)

=== Europe: East ===
Moldova

- Moldavian Democratic Republic

- Presidents (complete list) –

- Ion Inculeț, President (1917–1918)

- Prime ministers (complete list) –

- Pantelimon Erhan, Prime minister (1917–1918)
- Daniel Ciugureanu, Prime minister (1918)
- Petru Cazacu, Prime minister (1918)

Romania

- Kingdom of Romania

- Kings (complete list) –

- Charles I, King (1881–1914)
- Ferdinand I, King (1914–1927)
- Michael I, King (1927–1930)

- Prince Nicholas, Regent (1927–1930)
- Miron Cristea, Regent (1927–1930)
- Gheorghe Buzdugan, Regent (1927–1930)

- Carol II, King (1930–1940)
- Michael I, King (1940–1947)
- Ion Antonescu, Conducător (1940–1944)

- Prime ministers (complete list) –

- Petre P. Carp, Prime minister (1900–1901)
- Dimitrie Sturdza, Prime minister (1901–1906)
- Gheorghe Grigore Cantacuzino, Prime minister (1906–1907)
- Dimitrie Sturdza, Prime minister (1907–1909)
- Ion I. C. Brătianu, Prime minister (1909–1910)
- Petre P. Carp, Prime minister (1910–1912)
- Titu Maiorescu, Prime minister (1912–1914)
- Ion I. C. Brătianu, Prime minister (1914–1918)
- Alexandru Averescu, Prime minister (1918)
- Alexandru Marghiloman, Prime minister (1918)
- Constantin Coandă, Prime minister (1918)
- Ion I. C. Brătianu, Prime minister (1918–1919)
- Artur Văitoianu, Prime minister (1919)
- Alexandru Vaida-Voevod, Prime minister (1919–1920)
- Alexandru Averescu, Prime minister (1920–1921)
- Take Ionescu, Prime minister (1921–1922)
- Ion I. C. Brătianu, Prime minister (1922–1926)
- Alexandru Averescu, Prime minister (1926)
- Barbu Știrbey, Prime minister (1926–1927)
- Ion I. C. Brătianu, Prime minister (1927)
- Vintilă Brătianu, Prime minister (1927–1928)
- Iuliu Maniu, Prime minister (1928–1930)
- Gheorghe Mironescu, Prime minister (1930)
- Iuliu Maniu, Prime minister (1930)
- Gheorghe Mironescu, Prime minister (1930–1931)
- Nicolae Iorga, Prime minister (1931–1932)
- Alexandru Vaida-Voevod, Prime minister (1932)
- Iuliu Maniu, Prime minister (1932–1933)
- Alexandru Vaida-Voevod, Prime minister (1933)
- Ion G. Duca, Prime minister (1933)
- Constantin Angelescu, Acting Prime minister (1933–1934)
- Gheorghe Tătărescu, Prime minister (1934–1937)
- Octavian Goga, Prime minister (1937–1938)
- Miron Cristea, Prime minister (1938–1939)
- Armand Călinescu, Prime minister (1939)
- Gheorghe Argeșanu, Prime minister (1939)
- Constantin Argetoianu, Prime minister (1939)
- Gheorghe Tătărescu, Prime minister (1939–1940)
- Ion Gigurtu, Prime minister (1940)
- Ion Antonescu, Prime minister (1940–1944)
- Constantin Sănătescu, Prime minister (1944)
- Nicolae Rădescu, Prime minister (1944–1945)
- Petru Groza, Prime minister (1945–1947)

- Socialist Republic of Romania

- General Secretaries (complete list) –

- Gheorghe Gheorghiu-Dej, General Secretary (1944–1954)

- Heads of state (complete list) –

- Constantin Ion Parhon, President of the Provisional Presidium (1947–1948), President of the Presidium (1948–1952)

- Presidents of the council of ministers (complete list) –

- Petru Groza, Prime minister (1947–1952)

Russia

- Russian Empire

- Monarchs (complete list) –

- Nicholas II, Emperor (1894–1917)

- Chairman (complete list) –

- Ivan Durnovo, Chairman of the committee of ministers (1895–1903)
- Sergei Witte, Chairman of the committee of ministers (1903–1905), Chairman of council of ministers (1905–1906)
- Ivan Goremykin, Chairman of council of ministers (1906)
- Pyotr Stolypin, Chairman of council of ministers (1906–1911)
- Vladimir Kokovtsov, Chairman of council of ministers (1911–1914)
- Ivan Goremykin, Chairman of council of ministers (1914–1916)
- Boris Stürmer, Chairman of council of ministers (1916)
- Alexander Trepov, Chairman of council of ministers (1916)
- Nikolay Golitsyn, Chairman of council of ministers (1916–1917)

- Russian Republic

- Minister-Chairmen (complete list) –

- Georgy Lvov, Minister-Chairman (1917)
- Alexander Kerensky, Minister-Chairman (1917)

- Russian Soviet Federative Socialist Republic, Sovereign state (1917–1922)

- Chairmen of the Presidium of the Supreme Soviet (complete list) –

- Lev Kamenev, Chairman (1917)
- Yakov Sverdlov, Chairman (1917–1919)
- Mikhail Kalinin, Chairman (1919–1938)

- Premiers (complete list) –

- Vladimir Lenin, Premier (1917–1924)

- Soviet Union

- General Secretary (complete list) –

- Joseph Stalin, General Secretary (1922–1952)

- Heads of state (complete list) –

- Mikhail Kalinin, Chairman of the Central Executive Committee of the Congress of Soviets (1922–1938), Chairman of the Presidium of the Supreme Soviet (1938–1946)
- Nikolay Shvernik, Chairman of the Presidium of the Supreme Soviet (1946–1953)

- Heads of governments (complete list) –

- Vladimir Lenin, Chairman of the Council of People's Commissars (1922–1924)
- Alexei Rykov, Chairman of the Council of People's Commissars (1924–1930)
- Vyacheslav Molotov, Chairman of the Council of People's Commissars (1930–1941)
- Joseph Stalin, Chairman of the Council of People's Commissars (1941–1946), Chairman of the Council of Ministers (1946–1953)

- Don Republic –

- Pyotr Krasnov, Ataman (1918–1919)
- Afrikan Bogaevsky, Ataman (1919–1921)

- Kuban People's Republic –

- Alexander Filimonov, Ataman (1917–1919)
- Nikolai Bukretov, Ataman (1920)

- Mountainous Republic of the Northern Caucasus –

- Abdulmajid Tapa Tchermoeff, Prime minister (1918)
- Pshemakho Kotsev, Prime minister (1918–1919)

- North Caucasian Emirate –

- Uzun Hajji Saltinsky, Emir (1919–1920)

- North Ingria –

- Santeri Termonen, Chairmen (1919)
- Juho Pekka Kokko, Chairmen (1919)
- Georg Elfvengren, Chairmen (1919–1920)
- Jukka Tirranen, Chairmen (1920)

- Russian State (1918–1920)

- Heads of State (complete list) –
- Nikolai Avksentiev, Chairman of PA-RG (1918)

- Alexander Kolchak, Supreme Ruler (1918–1920)

- Prime ministers (complete list) –
- Pyotr Vologodsky, Prime Minister (1918–1919 first)
- Viktor Pepelyayev, Prime Minister (1919–1920 last)

- South Russia (1919–1920) –

- Anton Denikin, Commander-in-Chief (1920)
- Pyotr Wrangel, Commander-in-Chief (1920)

Ukraine

- Kingdom of Galicia and Lodomeria (complete list) –

1804–1918, crownland of the Austrian Empire

- Francis Joseph I, King (1848–1916)
- Karl I, King (1916–1918)

- Ukrainian People's Republic

- Presidents (complete list) –

- Mykhailo Hrushevsky, President (1917–1918)
- Directorate of Ukraine, President (1918–1921)

- Prime ministers (complete list) –

- Volodymyr Vynnychenko, Prime minister (1917–1918)
- Vsevolod Holubovych, Prime minister (1918)
- Mykola Vasylenko, Acting Prime minister (1918)
- Fedir Lyzohub, Prime minister (1918)
- Serhii Gerbel, Prime minister (1918)
- Volodymyr Chekhivsky, Prime minister (1918–1919)
- Serhii Ostapenko, Prime minister (1919)
- Borys Martos, Prime minister (1919)
- Isaak Mazepa, Prime minister (1919–1920)
- Vyacheslav Prokopovych, Prime minister (1920)

- West Ukrainian People's Republic (complete list) –

- Kost Levytsky, President (1918)
- Sydir Holubovych, President (1918–1919)

=== Europe: Nordic ===
Denmark

- Kingdom of Denmark

- Monarchs (complete list) –

- Christian IX, King (1863–1906)
- Frederik VIII, King (1906–1912)
- Christian X, King (1912–1947)
- Frederik IX, King (1947–1972)

- Prime ministers (complete list) –

- Hannibal Sehested, Council president (1900–1901)
- Johan Henrik Deuntzer, Council president (1901–1905)
- Jens Christian Christensen, Council president (1905–1908)
- Niels Neergaard, Council president (1908–1909)
- Ludvig Holstein-Ledreborg, Council president (1909)
- Carl Theodor Zahle, Council president (1909–1910)
- Klaus Berntsen, Council president (1910–1913)
- Carl Theodor Zahle, Council president (1913–1918), Prime minister (1918–1920)
- Otto Liebe, Prime minister (1920)
- Michael Pedersen Friis, Prime minister (1920)
- Niels Neergaard, Prime minister (1920–1924)
- Thorvald Stauning, Prime minister (1924–1926)
- Thomas Madsen-Mygdal, Prime minister (1926–1929)
- Thorvald Stauning, Prime minister (1929–1942)
- Vilhelm Buhl, Prime minister (1942)
- Erik Scavenius, Prime minister (1942–1943)
- Vilhelm Buhl, Prime minister (1945)
- Knud Kristensen, Prime minister (1945–1947)
- Hans Hedtoft, Prime minister (1947–1950)
- Erik Eriksen, Prime minister (1950–1953)

Finland

- Grand Duchy of Finland (complete list) –

- Nicholas II, Grand Prince (1894–1917)

- Kingdom of Finland (1918)

- Monarchs (complete list) –

- Pehr Evind Svinhufvud, Regent (1918)
- Carl Gustaf Emil Mannerheim, Regent (1918–1919)

- Prime ministers (complete list) –

- Juho Kusti Paasikivi, Prime minister (1918)
- Lauri Ingman, Prime minister (1918–1919)
- Kaarlo Castrén, Prime minister (1919)

- Republic of Finland

- Presidents (complete list) –

- Kaarlo Juho Ståhlberg, President (1919–1925)
- Lauri Kristian Relander, President (1925–1931)
- Pehr Evind Svinhufvud, President (1931–1937)
- Kyösti Kallio, President (1937–1940)
- Risto Ryti, President (1940–1944)
- Carl Gustaf Emil Mannerheim, President (1944–1946)
- Juho Kusti Paasikivi, President (1946–1956)

- Prime ministers (complete list) –

- Kaarlo Castrén, Prime minister (1919)
- Juho Vennola, Prime minister (1919–1920)
- Rafael Erich, Prime minister (1920–1921)
- Juho Vennola, Prime minister (1921–1922)
- Aimo Cajander, Prime minister (1922)
- Kyösti Kallio, Prime minister (1922–1924)
- Aimo Cajander, Prime minister (1924)
- Lauri Ingman, Prime minister (1924–1925)
- Antti Tulenheimo, Prime minister (1925)
- Kyösti Kallio, Prime minister (1925–1926)
- Väinö Tanner, Prime minister (1926–1927)
- Juho Sunila, Prime minister (1927–1928)
- Oskari Mantere, Prime minister (1928–1929)
- Kyösti Kallio, Prime minister (1929–1930)
- Pehr Evind Svinhufvud, Prime minister (1930–1931)
- Juho Sunila, Prime minister (1931–1932)
- Toivo Mikael Kivimäki, Prime minister (1932–1936)
- Kyösti Kallio, Prime minister (1936–1937)
- Aimo Cajander, Prime minister (1937–1939)
- Risto Ryti, Prime minister (1939–1940)
- Johan Wilhelm Rangell, Prime minister (1941–1943)
- Edwin Linkomies, Prime minister (1943–1944)
- Antti Hackzell, Prime minister (1944)
- Urho Castrén, Prime minister (1944)
- Juho Kusti Paasikivi, Prime minister (1944–1946)
- Mauno Pekkala, Prime minister (1946–1948)
- Karl-August Fagerholm, Prime minister (1948–1950)
- Urho Kekkonen, Prime minister (1950–1953)

- Finnish Democratic Republic –

Puppet state of the Soviet Union
- Otto Wille Kuusinen, Prime minister (1939–1940)

Iceland

- Kingdom of Iceland

- Monarchs (complete list) –

- Christian X, King (1918–1944)
- Sveinn Björnsson, Regent (1941–1944)

- Prime ministers (complete list) –

- Jón Magnússon, Prime minister (1917–1922)
- Sigurður Eggerz, Prime minister (1922–1924)
- Jón Magnússon, Prime minister (1924–1926)
- Magnús Guðmundsson, Acting Prime minister (1926)
- Jón Þorláksson, Prime minister (1926–1927)
- Tryggvi Þórhallsson, Prime minister (1927–1932)
- Ásgeir Ásgeirsson, Prime minister (1932–1934)
- Hermann Jónasson, Prime minister (1934–1942)
- Ólafur Thors, Prime minister (1942)
- Björn Þórðarson, Prime minister (1942–1944)

- Republic of Iceland

- Presidents (complete list) –

- Sveinn Björnsson, President (1944–1952)

- Prime ministers (complete list) –

- Björn Þórðarson, Prime minister (1944)
- Ólafur Thors, Prime minister (1944–1947)
- Stefán Jóhann Stefánsson, Prime minister (1947–1949)
- Ólafur Thors, Prime minister (1949–1950)
- Steingrímur Steinþórsson, Prime minister (1950–1953)

Sweden and Norway

- Union between Sweden and Norway

- Monarch (complete list / complete list) –

- Oscar II, King of Norway (1872–1905), King of Sweden (1872–1907)

- Prime ministers: Sweden (complete list) –

- Fredrik von Otter, Prime minister (1900–1902)
- Erik Gustaf Boström, Prime minister (1902–1905)
- Johan Ramstedt, Prime minister (1905)
- Christian Lundeberg, Prime minister (1905)

- Norwegian prime ministers in Stockholm (complete list) –

- Otto Blehr, Prime minister (1898–1902)
- Ole Anton Qvam, Prime minister (1902–1903)
- Sigurd Ibsen, Prime minister (1903–1905)
- Jørgen Løvland, Prime minister (1905)

- Prime ministers in Christiania, Norway (complete list) –

- Johannes Steen, Prime minister (1898–1902)
- Otto Blehr, Prime minister (1902–1905)
- Francis Hagerup, Prime minister (1905)
- Christian Michelsen, Prime minister (1905)

Norway

- Kingdom of Norway

- Monarchs (complete list) –

- Haakon VII, King (1905–1957)

- Prime ministers (complete list) –

- Christian Michelsen, Prime minister (1905–1907)
- Jørgen Løvland, Prime minister (1907–1908)
- Gunnar Knudsen, Prime minister (1908–1910)
- Wollert Konow, Prime minister (1910–1912)
- Jens Bratlie, Prime minister (1912–1913)
- Gunnar Knudsen, Prime minister (1913–1920)
- Otto Bahr Halvorsen, Prime minister (1920–1921)
- Otto Blehr, Prime minister (1921–1923)
- Otto Bahr Halvorsen, Prime minister (1923)
- Abraham Berge, Prime minister (1923–1924)
- Johan Ludwig Mowinckel, Prime minister (1924–1926)
- Ivar Lykke, Prime minister (1926–1928)
- Christopher Hornsrud, Prime minister (1928)
- Johan Ludwig Mowinckel, Prime minister (1928–1931)
- Peder Kolstad, Prime minister (1931–1932)
- Jens Hundseid, Prime minister (1932–1933)
- Johan Ludwig Mowinckel, Prime minister (1933–1935)
- Johan Nygaardsvold, Prime minister (1935–1940), Prime Minister in exile (1940–1942)
- Vidkun Quisling, Prime minister (1940)
- Ingolf Elster Christensen, Chairman of the Administrative Council (1940)
- Josef Terboven, German Commissioner for Norway (1940–1945)
- Vidkun Quisling, Minister President (1942–1945)
- Einar Gerhardsen, Prime minister (1945–1951)

- Quisling regime of Norway

Puppet state of Germany
- Reichskommissars –

- Josef Terboven, Reichskommissar (1940–1945)
- Franz Böhme (acting), Reichskommissar (1945)

- Minister President (complete list) –

- Vidkun Quisling, Minister President (1942–1945)

Sweden

- Kingdom of Sweden

- Monarchs (complete list) –

- Oscar II, King of Norway (1872–1905), King of Sweden (1872–1907)
- Gustaf V, King (1907–1950)
- Gustaf VI Adolf, King (1950–1973)

- Prime ministers (complete list) –

- Fredrik von Otter, Prime minister (1900–1902)
- Erik Gustaf Boström, Prime minister (1902–1905)
- Johan Ramstedt, Prime minister (1905)
- Christian Lundeberg, Prime minister (1905)
- Karl Staaff, Prime minister (1905–1906)
- Arvid Lindman, Prime minister (1906–1911)
- Karl Staaff, Prime minister (1911–1914)
- Hjalmar Hammarskjöld, Prime minister (1914–1917)
- Carl Swartz, Prime minister (1917)
- Nils Edén, Prime minister (1917–1920)
- Hjalmar Branting, Prime minister (1920)
- Gerhard Louis De Geer, Prime minister (1920–1921)
- Oscar von Sydow, Prime minister (1921)
- Hjalmar Branting, Prime minister (1921–1923)
- Ernst Trygger, Prime minister (1923–1924)
- Hjalmar Branting, Prime minister (1924–1925)
- Rickard Sandler, Prime minister (1925–1926)
- Carl Gustaf Ekman, Prime minister (1926–1928)
- Arvid Lindman, Prime minister (1928–1930)
- Carl Gustaf Ekman, Prime minister (1930–1932)
- Felix Hamrin, Prime minister (1932)
- Per Albin Hansson, Prime minister (1932–1936)
- Axel Pehrsson-Bramstorp, Prime minister (1936)
- Per Albin Hansson, Prime minister (1936–1946)
- Tage Erlander, Prime minister (1946–1969)

=== Europe: Southcentral ===
Italy

- Kingdom of Italy

- Monarchs (complete list) –

- Victor Emmanuel III, King (1900–1946)
- Umberto II, King (1946)

- Prime ministers (complete list) –

- Giuseppe Saracco, Prime minister (1900–1901)
- Giuseppe Zanardelli, Prime minister (1901–1903)
- Giovanni Giolitti, Prime minister (1903–1905)
- Tommaso Tittoni, Prime minister (1905)
- Alessandro Fortis, Prime minister (1905–1906)
- Sidney Sonnino, Prime minister (1906)
- Giovanni Giolitti, Prime minister (1906–1909)
- Sidney Sonnino, Prime minister (1909–1910)
- Luigi Luzzatti, Prime minister (1910–1911)
- Giovanni Giolitti, Prime minister (1911–1914)
- Antonio Salandra, Prime minister (1914–1916)
- Paolo Boselli, Prime minister (1916–1917)
- Vittorio Emanuele Orlando, Prime minister (1917–1919)
- Francesco Saverio Nitti, Prime minister (1919–1920)
- Giovanni Giolitti, Prime minister (1920–1921)
- Ivanoe Bonomi, Prime minister (1921–1922)
- Luigi Facta, Prime minister (1922)
- Benito Mussolini, Prime minister (1922–1943)
- Pietro Badoglio, Prime minister (1943–1944)
- Ivanoe Bonomi, Prime minister (1944–1945)
- Ferruccio Parri, Prime minister (1945)
- Alcide De Gasperi, Prime minister (1945–1946)

- Italian Regency of Carnaro –

- Gabriele D'Annunzio, Comandante (1919–1920)

- Italian Social Republic (complete list) –

Puppet state of Germany
- Benito Mussolini, Duce (1943–1945)

- Fascist Italy (1922–1943)

- King (complete list) –

- Victor Emmanuel III, King (1900–1946)

- Prime ministers (complete list) –

- Benito Mussolini, Prime Minister (1922–1943)

- Free Territory of Trieste

UN Security Council-controlled temporary military government, 1947–1954

- Republic of Italy

- Presidents (complete list) –

- Enrico De Nicola, Provisional Head of State (1946–1948), President (1948)
- Luigi Einaudi, President (1948–1955)

- Prime ministers (complete list) –

- Alcide De Gasperi, Prime minister (1946–1953)

Malta

- Crown Colony of Malta (complete list) –

British colony, 1813–1964
For details see the United Kingdom under British Isles, Europe

San Marino

- San Marino

- Captains Regent (1900–present) –

- Domenico Fattori, Antonio Righi, Captains Regent (1900)
- Giovanni Bonelli, Pietro Ugolini, Captains Regent (1900–1901)
- Luigi Tonnini, Marino Nicolini, Captains Regent (1901)
- Antonio Bellucci, Pasquale Busignani, Captains Regent (1901–1902)
- Onofrio Fattori, Egidio Ceccoli, Captains Regent (1902)
- Gemino Gozi, Giacomo Marcucci, Captains Regent (1902–1903)
- Federico Gozi, Nullo Balducci, Captains Regent (1903)
- Marino Borbiconi, Francesco Marcucci, Captains Regent (1903–1904)
- Menetto Bonelli, Vincenzo Mularoni, Captains Regent (1904)
- Luigi Tonnini, Gustavo Babboni, Captains Regent (1904–1905)
- Antonio Bellucci, Pasquale Busignani, Captains Regent (1905)
- Onofrio Fattori, Piermatteo Carattoni, Captains Regent (1905–1906)
- Giovanni Belluzzi, Pietro Francini, Captains Regent (1906)
- Alfredo Reffi, Giovanni Arzilli, Captains Regent (1906–1907)
- Ciro Belluzzi, Francesco Pasquali, Captains Regent (1907)
- Giuseppe Angeli, Francesco Valli, Captains Regent (1907–1908)
- Menetto Bonelli, Gustavo Babboni, Captains Regent (1908)
- Olinto Amati, Raffaele Michetti, Captains Regent (1908–1909)
- Luigi Tonnini, Domenico Suzzi Valli, Captains Regent (1909)
- Marino Borbiconi, Giacomo Marcucci, Captains Regent (1909–1910)
- Alfredo Reffi, Giovanni Arzilli, Captains Regent (1910)
- Giovanni Belluzzi, Luigi Lonfernini, Captains Regent (1910–1911)
- Moro Morri, Cesare Stacchini, Captains Regent (1911)
- Onofrio Fattori, Angelo Manzoni Borghesi, Captains Regent (1911–1912)
- Gustavo Babboni, Francesco Pasquali, Captains Regent (1912)
- Menetto Bonelli, Vincenzo Marcucci, Captains Regent (1912–1913)
- Giuseppe Angeli, Ignazio Grazia, Captains Regent (1913)
- Cirro Belluzzi, Domenico Suzzi Valli, Captains Regent (1913–1914)
- Domenico Fattori, Ferruccio Martelli, Captains Regent (1914)
- Olinto Amati, Cesare Stacchini, Captains Regent (1914–1915)
- Moro Morri, Antonio Burgagni, Captains Regent (1915)
- Alfredo Reffi, Luigi Lonfernini, Captains Regent (1915–1916)
- Onofrio Fattori, Ciro Francini, Captains Regent (1916)
- Gustavo Babboni, Giovanni Arzilli, Captains Regent (1916–1917)
- Egisto Morri, Vincenzo Marcucci, Captains Regent (1917)
- Angelo Manzoni Borghesi, Giuseppe Balducci, Captains Regent (1917–1918)
- Ferruccio Martelli, Ermenegildo Mularoni, Captains Regent (1918)
- Protogene Belloni, Francesco Morri, Captains Regent (1918–1919)
- Domenico Vicini, Pietro Suzzi Valli, Captains Regent (1919)
- Moro Morri, Francesco Pasquali, Captains Regent (1919–1920)
- Marino Rossi, Ciro Francini, Captains Regent (1920)
- Carlo Balsimelli, Simone Michelotti, Captains Regent (1920–1921)
- Marino Della Balda, Vincenzo Francini, Captains Regent (1921)
- Egisto Morri, Giuseppe Lanci, Captains Regent (1921–1922)
- Eugenio Reffi, Giovanni Arzilli, Captains Regent (1922)
- Onofrio Fattori, Giuseppe Balducci, Captains Regent (1922–1923)
- Giuliano Gozi, Filippo Mularoni, Captains Regent (1923)
- Marino Borbiconi, Mario Michetti, Captains Regent (1923–1924)
- Angelo Manzoni Borghesi, Francesco Mularoni, Captains Regent (1924)
- Francesco Morri, Girolamo Gozi, Captains Regent (1924–1925)
- Marino Fattori, Augusto Mularoni, Captains Regent (1925)
- Valerio Pasquali, Marco Marcucci, Captains Regent (1925–1926)
- Manlio Gozi, Giuseppe Mularoni, Captains Regent (1926)
- Giuliano Gozi, Ruggero Morri, Captains Regent (1926–1927)
- Gino Gozi, Marino Morri, Captains Regent (1927)
- Marino Rossi, Nelson Burgagni, Captains Regent (1927–1928)
- Domenico Suzzi Valli, Francesco Pasquali, Captains Regent (1928)
- Francesco Morri, Melchiorre Filippi, Captains Regent (1928–1929)
- Girolamo Gozi, Filippo Mularoni, Captains Regent (1929)
- Ezio Balducci, Aldo Busignani, Captains Regent (1929–1930)
- Manlio Gozi, Marino Lonfernini, Turiddu Foschi, Captains Regent (1930)
- Valerio Pasquali, Gino Ceccoli, Captains Regent (1930–1931)
- Angelo Manzoni Borghesi, Francesco Mularoni, Captains Regent (1931)
- Domenico Suzzi Valli, Marino Morri, Captains Regent (1931–1932)
- Giuliano Gozi, Pompeo Righi, Captains Regent (1932)
- Gino Gozi, Ruggero Morri, Captains Regent (1932–1933)
- Francesco Morri, Settimio Belluzzi, Captains Regent (1933)
- Carlo Balsimelli, Melchiorre Filippi, Captains Regent (1933–1934)
- Marino Rossi, Giovanni Lonfernini, Captains Regent (1934)
- Angelo Manzoni Borghesi, Marino Michelotti, Captains Regent (1934–1935)
- Federico Gozi, Salvatore Foschi, Captains Regent (1935)
- Pompeo Righi, Marino Morri, Captains Regent (1935–1936)
- Gino Gozi, Ruggero Morri, Captains Regent (1936)
- Francesco Morri, Gino Ceccoli, Captains Regent (1936–1937)
- Giuliano Gozi, Settimio Belluzzi, Captains Regent (1937)
- Marino Rossi, Giovanni Lonfernini, Captains Regent (1937–1938)
- Manlio Gozi, Luigi Mularoni, Captains Regent (1938)
- Carlo Balsimelli, Celio Gozi, Captains Regent (1938–1939)
- Pompeo Righi, Marino Morri, Captains Regent (1939)
- Marino Michelotti, Orlando Reffi, Captains Regent (1939–1940)
- Angelo Manzoni Borghesi, Filippo Mularoni, Captains Regent (1940)
- Federico Gozi, Salvatore Foschi, Captains Regent (1940–1941)
- Gino Gozi, Secondo Menicucci, Captains Regent (1941)
- Giuliano Gozi, Giovanni Lonfernini, Captains Regent (1941–1942)
- Settimio Belluzzi, Celio Gozi, Captains Regent (1942)
- Carlo Balsimelli, Renato Martelli, Captains Regent (1942–1943)
- Marino Michelotti, Bartolomeo Manzoni Borghesi, Captains Regent (1943)
- Marino Della Balda, Sante Lonfernini, Captains Regent (1943–1944)
- Francesco Balsimelli, Sanzio Valentini, Captains Regent (1944)
- Teodoro Lonfernini, Leonida Suzzi Valli, Captains Regent (1944–1945)
- Alvaro Casali, Vittorio Valentini, Captains Regent (1945)
- Ferruccio Martelli, Secondo Fiorini, Captains Regent (1945–1946)
- Giuseppe Forcellini, Vincenzo Pedini, Captains Regent (1946)
- Filippo Martelli, Luigi Montironi, Captains Regent (1946–1947)
- Marino Della Balda, Luigi Zafferani, Captains Regent (1947)
- Domenico Forcellini, Mariano Ceccoli, Captains Regent (1947–1948)
- Arnaldo Para, Giuseppe Renzi, Captains Regent (1948)
- Giordano Giacomini, Domenico Tomassoni, Captains Regent (1948–1949)
- Ferruccio Martelli, Primo Bugli, Captains Regent (1949)
- Vincenzo Pedini, Agostino Biordi, Captains Regent (1949–1950)
- Giuseppe Forcellini, Primo Taddei, Captains Regent (1950)
- Marino Della Balda, Luigi Montironi, Captains Regent (1950–1951)

Vatican

- Vatican City

- Sovereign (complete list) –

- Pius XI, Sovereign (1929–1939)
- Pius XII, Sovereign (1939–1958)

- President of the Governorate (complete list) –

- Nicola Canali, President of the Governorate (1939–1961)

=== Europe: Southwest ===
Andorra

- Andorra

- Episcopal Co-Princes (complete list) –

- Salvador Casañas y Pagés, Episcopal Co-Prince (1879–1901)
- Ramon Riu i Cabanes, Episcopal Co-Prince (1901)
- Toribio Martín, Interim Episcopal Co-Prince (1902)
- Joan Josep Laguarda i Fenollera, Episcopal Co-Prince (1902–1906)
- Josep Pujargimzú, Interim Episcopal Co-Prince (1907)
- Juan Benlloch i Vivó, Episcopal Co-Prince (1907–1919)
- Jaume Viladrich i Gaspa, Interim Episcopal Co-Prince (1919–1920)
- Justí Guitart i Vilardebó, Episcopal Co-Prince (1920–1940)
- Ricard Fornesa i Puigdemasa (Vicar capitular), Interim Episcopal Co-Prince (1940–1943)
- Ramon Iglesias i Navarri, Episcopal Co-Prince (1943–1969)

- French Co-Princes (complete list) –

- Émile Loubet, French Co-Prince (1899–1906)
- Armand Fallières, French Co-Prince (1906–1913)
- Raymond Poincaré, French Co-Prince (1913–1920)
- Paul Deschanel, French Co-Prince (1920)
- Alexandre Millerand, French Co-Prince (1920–1924)
- Frédéric François-Marsal, Acting French Co-Prince (1924)
- Gaston Doumergue, French Co-Prince (1924–1931)
- Paul Doumer, French Co-Prince (1931–1932)
- André Tardieu, Acting French Co-Prince (1932)
- Albert François Lebrun, French Co-Prince (1932–1940)
- Philippe Pétain, French Co-Prince (1940–1944)
- Charles de Gaulle, French Co-Prince (1944–1946)
- Félix Gouin, French Co-Prince (1946)
- Georges Bidault, French Co-Prince (1946)
- Vincent Auriol, Interim French Co-Prince (1946)
- Léon Blum, French Co-Prince (1946–1947)
- Vincent Auriol, French Co-Prince (1947–1954)

Portugal

- Kingdom of Portugal

- Monarchs (complete list) –

- Carlos I, King (1889–1908)
- Manuel II, King (1908–1910)

- Presidents of the Council of Ministers (complete list) –

- Ernesto Hintze Ribeiro, President of the Council of Ministers (1900–1904)
- Luciano de Castro, President of the Council of Ministers (1904–1906)
- Ernesto Hintze Ribeiro, President of the Council of Ministers (1906)
- João Franco, President of the Council of Ministers (1906–1908)
- Francisco Ferreira do Amaral, President of the Council of Ministers (1908)
- Artur de Campos Henriques, President of the Council of Ministers (1908–1909)
- Sebastião Teles, President of the Council of Ministers (1909)
- Venceslau de Lima, President of the Council of Ministers (1909)
- Francisco da Veiga Beirão, President of the Council of Ministers (1909–1910)
- António Teixeira de Sousa, President of the Council of Ministers (1910)

- First Portuguese Republic

- Presidents (complete list) –

- Teófilo Braga, President of Provisional Government (1910–1911)
- Manuel de Arriaga, President (1911–1915)
- Teófilo Braga, President (1915)
- Bernardino Machado, President (1915–1917)
- Ministry: Sidónio Pais (President of the Ministry), António Machado Santos, Alberto de Moura Pinto, António dos Santos Viegas, António Aresta Branco, Francisco Xavier Esteves, João Tamagnini Barbosa, Alfredo Magalhães, Feliciano da Costa, Acting head of state (1917)
- Sidónio Pais, President (1917–1918)
- Government: António Bernardino Ferreira, Jorge Couceiro da Costa, João Tamagnini Barbosa, Álvaro de Mendonça, João do Canto e Castro (Acting President of the Government), António Egas Moniz, João Alberto Azevedo Neves, Alexandre de Vasconcelos e Sá, Alfredo Magalhães, Henrique Forbes de Bessa, José João da Cruz Azevedo, Eduardo Fernandes de Oliveira, Acting head of state (1918)
- João do Canto e Castro, President (1918–1919)
- António José de Almeida, President (1919–1923)
- Manuel Teixeira Gomes, President (1923–1925)
- Bernardino Machado, President (1925–1926)

- Presidents of the Ministry (complete list) –

- Teófilo Braga, President of the Ministry (1910–1911)
- João Chagas, President of the Ministry (1911)
- Augusto de Vasconcelos, President of the Ministry (1911–1912)
- Duarte Leite, President of the Ministry (1912)
- Augusto de Vasconcelos, Acting President of the Ministry (1912)
- Duarte Leite, President of the Ministry (1912–1913)
- Afonso Costa, President of the Ministry (1913–1914)
- Bernardino Machado, President of the Ministry (1914)
- Vítor Hugo de Azevedo Coutinho, President of the Ministry (1914–1915)
- Joaquim Pimenta de Castro, President of the Ministry (1915)
- Constitutional Junta: José Norton de Matos, António Maria da Silva, José de Freitas Ribeiro, Alfredo de Sá Cardoso, Álvaro de Castro, Acting head of government (1915)
- João Chagas, President of the Ministry designate (1915)
- José de Castro, Acting President of the Ministry and President of the Ministry (1915)
- Afonso Costa, President of the Ministry (1915–1916)
- António José de Almeida, President of the Ministry (1916)
- Afonso Costa, Acting President of the Ministry (1916)
- António José de Almeida, President of the Ministry (1916–1917)
- Afonso Costa, President of the Ministry (1917)
- José Norton de Matos, Acting President of the Ministry (1917)
- Afonso Costa, President of the Ministry (1917)
- José Norton de Matos, Acting President of the Ministry (1917)
- Revolutionary Junta: Sidónio Pais (President), António Machado Santos (Member), Feliciano da Costa (Member), Acting head of government (1917)
- Sidónio Pais, Acting head of government (1917–1918)
- Government: António Bernardino Ferreira, Jorge Couceiro da Costa, João Tamagnini Barbosa, Álvaro de Mendonça, João do Canto e Castro, António Egas Moniz, João Alberto Azevedo Neves, Alexandre de Vasconcelos e Sá, Alfredo Magalhães, Henrique Forbes de Bessa, José João da Cruz Azevedo, Eduardo Fernandes de Oliveira, Acting head of government (1918)
- João do Canto e Castro, Acting President of the Government (1918)
- João Tamagnini Barbosa, President of the Ministry (1918–1919)
- José Relvas, President of the Ministry (1919)
- Domingos Pereira, President of the Ministry (1919)
- Alfredo de Sá Cardoso, President of the Ministry (1919–1920)
- Francisco Fernandes Costa, President of the Ministry designate (1920)
- Alfredo de Sá Cardoso, President of the Ministry (1920)
- Domingos Pereira, President of the Ministry (1920)
- António Maria Baptista, President of the Ministry (1920)
- José Ramos Preto, Acting President of the Ministry and President of the Ministry (1920)
- António Maria da Silva, President of the Ministry (1920)
- António Granjo, President of the Ministry (1920)
- Álvaro de Castro, President of the Ministry (1920)
- Liberato Pinto, President of the Ministry (1920–1921)
- Bernardino Machado, President of the Ministry (1921)
- Tomé de Barros Queirós, President of the Ministry (1921)
- António Granjo, President of the Ministry (1921)
- Ministry: Raul Lelo Portela, António Vicente Ferreira, António Maria de Freitas Soares, Ricardo Pais Gomes, João de Melo Barreto, António Curson, Manuel Ferreira da Rocha, António Ginestal Machado, Júlio Ernesto de Lima Duque, António Aboim Inglês, Acting head of government (1921)
- Manuel Maria Coelho, President of the Ministry (1921)
- Carlos Maia Pinto, President of the Ministry (1921)
- Francisco Cunha Leal, President of the Ministry (1921–1922)
- António Maria da Silva, President of the Ministry (1922–1923)
- António Ginestal Machado, President of the Ministry (1923)
- Álvaro de Castro, President of the Ministry (1923–1924)
- Alfredo Rodrigues Gaspar, President of the Ministry (1924)
- José Domingues dos Santos, President of the Ministry (1924–1925)
- Vitorino Guimarães, President of the Ministry (1925)
- António Maria da Silva, President of the Ministry (1925)
- Domingos Pereira, President of the Ministry (1925)
- António Maria da Silva, President of the Ministry (1925–1926)

- Ditadura Nacional of Portugal

- Presidents (complete list) –

- José Mendes Cabeçadas, President (1926)
- Ministry: Manuel Gomes da Costa (President of the Ministry), António Claro, Filomeno da Câmara, Artur Ricardo Jorge, Armando da Gama Ochoa, Acting head of state (1926)
- Manuel Gomes da Costa, President (1926)
- Ministry: Óscar Carmona (President of the Ministry), José Ribeiro Castanho, Manuel Rodrigues, João Sinel de Cordes, Jaime Afreixo, António Maria de Bettencourt Rodrigues, Abílio Passos e Sousa, João Belo, Artur Ricardo Jorge, Alfredo Magalhães, Felisberto Pedrosa, Acting head of state (1926)
- Óscar Carmona, President (1926–1935)

- Presidents of the Ministry (complete list) –

- Public Salvation Junta: José Mendes Cabeçadas, Armando da Gama Ochoa, Jaime Baptista, Carlos Vilhena, Acting head of government (1926)
- José Mendes Cabeçadas, President of Ministry (1926)
- Manuel Gomes da Costa, President of Ministry (1926)
- Óscar Carmona, President of Ministry (1926–1928)
- José Vicente de Freitas, President of Ministry (1928–1929)
- Artur Ivens Ferraz, President of Ministry (1929)
- Luís Maria Lopes da Fonseca, Acting President of Ministry (1929)
- Artur Ivens Ferraz, President of Ministry (1929–1930)
- Domingos Oliveira, President of Ministry (1930–1932)
- António de Oliveira Salazar, President of Ministry (1932–1933)

- Second Portuguese Republic

- Presidents (complete list) –

- Óscar Carmona, President (1926–1935)
- António de Oliveira Salazar, Acting President (1935)
- Óscar Carmona, President (1935–1951)

- Presidents of the Ministry (complete list) –

- António de Oliveira Salazar, President of the Council of Minister (1933–1968)

Spain

- Bourbon Restoration of Spain

- Monarchs (complete list) –

- Alfonso XIII, King (1886–1931)

- Prime ministers (complete list) –

- Marcelo Azcárraga Palmero, Prime minister (1900–1901)
- Práxedes Mateo Sagasta, Prime minister (1901–1902)
- Francisco Silvela, Prime minister (1902–1903)
- Raimundo Fernández-Villaverde, Prime minister (1903)
- Antonio Maura, Prime minister (1903–1904)
- Marcelo Azcárraga Palmero, Prime minister (1904–1905)
- Francisco Silvela, Prime minister (1905–1905)
- Eugenio Montero Ríos, Prime minister (1905)
- Segismundo Moret, Prime minister (1905–1906)
- José López Domínguez, Prime minister (1906)
- Antonio González de Aguilar, Prime minister (1906–1907)
- Antonio Maura, Prime minister (1907–1909)
- Segismundo Moret, Prime minister (1909–1910)
- José Canalejas, Prime minister (1910–1912)
- Manuel García-Prieto, Prime minister (1912)
- Álvaro de Figueroa, Prime minister (1912–1913)
- Eduardo Dato, Prime minister (1913–1915)
- Álvaro de Figueroa, Prime minister (1915–1917)
- Manuel García-Prieto, Prime minister (1917)
- Eduardo Dato, Prime minister (1917)
- Manuel García-Prieto, Prime minister (1917–1918)
- Antonio Maura, Prime minister (1918)
- Manuel García-Prieto, Prime minister (1918)
- Álvaro de Figueroa, Prime minister (1918–1919)
- Antonio Maura, Prime minister (1919)
- Joaquín Sánchez de Toca, Prime minister (1919)
- Manuel Allendesalazar y Muñoz de Salazar, Prime minister (1919–1920)
- Eduardo Dato, Prime minister (1920–1921)
- Gabino Bugallal Araújo, Acting Prime minister (1921)
- Manuel Allendesalazar y Muñoz de Salazar, Prime minister (1921)
- Antonio Maura, Prime minister (1921–1922)
- José Sánchez-Guerra y Martínez, Prime minister (1922)
- Miguel Primo de Rivera, Prime minister (1922–1923)
- Miguel Primo de Rivera, Prime minister (1923–1930)
- Dámaso Berenguer, Prime minister (1930–1931)
- Juan Bautista Aznar-Cabañas, Prime minister (1931)

- Second Spanish Republic

- Presidents (complete list) –

- Niceto Alcalá-Zamora, President (1931–1936)
- Diego Martínez Barrio, Acting President (1936)
- Manuel Azaña, President (1936–1939)
- José Miaja, Interim President (1939)

- Prime ministers (complete list) –

- Niceto Alcalá-Zamora, Prime minister (1931)
- Manuel Azaña, Prime minister (1931–1933)
- Alejandro Lerroux, Prime minister (1933)
- Diego Martínez Barrio, Prime minister (1933)
- Alejandro Lerroux, Prime minister (1933–1934)
- Ricardo Samper, Prime minister (1934)
- Alejandro Lerroux, Prime minister (1934–1935)
- Joaquín Chapaprieta, Prime minister (1935)
- Manuel Portela Valladares, Prime minister (1935–1936)
- Manuel Azaña, Prime minister (1936)
- Augusto Barcía Trelles, Prime minister (1936)
- Santiago Casares Quiroga, Prime minister (1936)
- Diego Martínez Barrio, Prime minister (1936)
- José Giral, Prime minister (1936)
- Francisco Largo Caballero, Prime minister (1936–1937)
- Juan Negrín, Prime minister (1937–1939)

- Spanish State (Francoist Spain)

- Head of state (complete list) –

- Francisco Franco, Caudillo (1936–1975)

- Prime minister (complete list) –

- Francisco Franco, Prime minister (1936–1973)

=== Europe: West ===
Belgium

- Belgium

- Monarchs (complete list) –

- Leopold II, King (1865–1909)
- Albert I, King (1909–1934)
- Leopold III, King (1934–1951)

- Prime ministers (complete list) –

- Paul de Smet de Naeyer, Prime minister (1899–1907)
- Jules de Trooz, Prime minister (1907)
- Frans Schollaert, Prime minister (1908–1911)
- Charles de Broqueville, Prime minister (1911–1918)
- Gérard Cooreman, Prime minister (1918)
- Léon Delacroix, Prime minister (1918–1920)
- Henri Carton de Wiart, Prime minister (1920–1921)
- Georges Theunis, Prime minister (1921–1925)
- Aloys Van de Vyvere, Prime minister (1925)
- Prosper Poullet, Prime minister (1925–1926)
- Henri Jaspar, Prime minister (1926–1931)
- Jules Renkin, Prime minister (1931–1932)
- Charles de Broqueville, Prime minister (1932–1934)
- Georges Theunis, Prime minister (1934–1935)
- Paul van Zeeland, Prime minister (1935–1937)
- Paul-Émile Janson, Prime minister (1937–1938)
- Paul-Henri Spaak, Prime minister (1938–1939)
- Hubert Pierlot, Prime minister (1939–1945)
- Achille Van Acker, Prime minister (1945–1946)
- Paul-Henri Spaak, Prime minister (1946)
- Achille Van Acker, Prime minister (1946)
- Camille Huysmans, Prime minister (1946–1947)
- Paul-Henri Spaak, Prime minister (1947–1949)
- Gaston Eyskens, Prime minister (1949–1950)
- Jean Duvieusart, Prime minister (1950)
- Joseph Pholien, Prime minister (1950–1952)

France

- French Third Republic

- Presidents (complete list) –

- Émile Loubet, President (1899–1906)
- Armand Fallières, President (1906–1913)
- Raymond Poincaré, President (1913–1920)
- Paul Deschanel, President (1920)
- Alexandre Millerand, President (1920–1924)
- Frédéric François-Marsal, Acting President (1924)
- Gaston Doumergue, President (1924–1931)
- Paul Doumer, President (1931–1932)
- André Tardieu, Acting President (1932)
- Albert François Lebrun, President (1932–1940)

- President of the Council of ministers (complete list) –

- Pierre Waldeck-Rousseau, President of the Council of ministers (1899–1902)
- Émile Combes, President of the Council of ministers (1902–1905)
- Maurice Rouvier, President of the Council of ministers (1905–1906)
- Ferdinand Sarrien, President of the Council of ministers (1906)
- Georges Clemenceau, President of the Council of ministers (1906–1909)
- Aristide Briand, President of the Council of ministers (1909–1911)
- Ernest Monis, President of the Council of ministers (1911)
- Joseph Caillaux, President of the Council of ministers (1911–1912)
- Raymond Poincaré, President of the Council of ministers (1912–1913)
- Aristide Briand, President of the Council of ministers (1913)
- Louis Barthou, President of the Council of ministers (1913)
- Gaston Doumergue, President of the Council of ministers (1913–1914)
- Alexandre Ribot, President of the Council of ministers (1914)
- René Viviani, President of the Council of ministers (1914–1915)
- Aristide Briand, President of the Council of ministers (1915–1917)
- Alexandre Ribot, President of the Council of ministers (1917)
- Paul Painlevé, President of the Council of ministers (1917)
- Georges Clemenceau, President of the Council of ministers (1917–1920)
- Alexandre Millerand, President of the Council of ministers (1920)
- Georges Leygues, President of the Council of ministers (1920–1921)
- Aristide Briand, President of the Council of ministers (1921–1922)
- Raymond Poincaré, President of the Council of ministers (1922–1924)
- Frédéric François-Marsal, President of the Council of ministers (1924)
- Édouard Herriot, President of the Council of ministers (1924–1925)
- Paul Painlevé, President of the Council of ministers (1925)
- Aristide Briand, President of the Council of ministers (1925–1926)
- Édouard Herriot, President of the Council of ministers (1926)
- Raymond Poincaré, President of the Council of ministers (1926–1929)
- Aristide Briand, President of the Council of ministers (1929)
- André Tardieu, President of the Council of ministers (1929–1930)
- Camille Chautemps, President of the Council of ministers (1930)
- André Tardieu, President of the Council of ministers (1930)
- Théodore Steeg, President of the Council of ministers (1930–1931)
- Pierre Laval, President of the Council of ministers (1931–1932)
- André Tardieu, President of the Council of ministers (1932)
- Édouard Herriot, President of the Council of ministers (1932)
- Joseph Paul-Boncour, President of the Council of ministers (1932–1933)
- Édouard Daladier, President of the Council of ministers (1933)
- Albert Sarraut, President of the Council of ministers (1933)
- Camille Chautemps, President of the Council of ministers (1933–1934)
- Édouard Daladier, President of the Council of ministers (1934)
- Gaston Doumergue, President of the Council of ministers (1934)
- Pierre-Étienne Flandin, President of the Council of ministers (1934–1935)
- Fernand Bouisson, President of the Council of ministers (1935)
- Pierre Laval, President of the Council of ministers (1935–1936)
- Albert Sarraut, President of the Council of ministers (1936)
- Léon Blum, President of the Council of ministers (1936–1937)
- Camille Chautemps, President of the Council of ministers (1937–1938)
- Léon Blum, President of the Council of ministers (1938)
- Édouard Daladier, President of the Council of ministers (1938–1940)
- Paul Reynaud, President of the Council of ministers (1940)
- Philippe Pétain, President of the Council of ministers (1940)

- Military Administration in Belgium and Northern France

- Military Commanders –

- Gerd von Rundstedt, Military Commander (1940)
- Alexander von Falkenhausen, Military Commander (1940–1944)

- Administrator –

- Eggert Reeder, Administrator (1940–1944)

- Vichy France

- Chiefs of state (complete list) –

- Philippe Pétain, Chief of state (1940–1944)

- Prime ministers (complete list) –

- Pierre Laval, Prime minister (1940)
- Pierre-Étienne Flandin, Prime minister (1940–1941)
- François Darlan, Prime minister (1941–1942)
- Pierre Laval, Prime minister (1942–1944)

- Provisional Government of the French Republic

- Chairmen of the Provisional Government (complete list) –

- Charles de Gaulle, Chairmen (1944–1946)
- Félix Gouin, Chairmen (1946)
- Georges Bidault, Chairmen (1946)
- Vincent Auriol, Interim Chairmen (1946)
- Léon Blum, Chairmen (1946–1947)

- Prime ministers (complete list) –

- Charles de Gaulle, Prime minister (1944–1946)
- Félix Gouin, Prime minister (1946)
- Georges Bidault, Prime minister (1946)
- Vincent Auriol, Prime minister (1946)
- Léon Blum, Prime minister (1946–1947)

- French Fourth Republic

- Presidents (complete list) –

- Vincent Auriol, President (1947–1954)

- President of the Council of ministers (complete list) –

- Paul Ramadier, Prime minister (1947)
- Robert Schuman, Prime minister (1947–1948)
- André Marie, Prime minister (1948)
- Robert Schuman, Prime minister (1948)
- Henri Queuille, Prime minister (1948–1949)
- Georges Bidault, Prime minister (1949–1950)
- Henri Queuille, Prime minister (1950)
- René Pleven, Prime minister (1950–1951)

Luxembourg

- Grand Duchy of Luxembourg

- Monarchs (complete list) –

- Adolphe, Grand Duke (1890–1905)
- William IV, Grand Duke (1905–1912)
- Marie-Adélaïde, Grand Duchess (1912–1919)
- Charlotte, Grand Duchess (1919–1964)

- Prime ministers (complete list) –

- Paul Eyschen, Prime minister (1888–1915)
- Mathias Mongenast, Prime minister (1915)
- Hubert Loutsch, Prime minister (1915–1916)
- Victor Thorn, Prime minister (1916–1917)
- Léon Kauffman, Prime minister (1917–1918)
- Émile Reuter, Prime minister (1918–1925)
- Pierre Prüm, Prime minister (1925–1926)
- Joseph Bech, Prime minister (1926–1937)
- Pierre Dupong, Prime minister (1937–1953)

Monaco

- Monaco

- Sovereign Prince (complete list) –

- Albert I, Prince (1889–1922)
- Louis II, Prince (1922–1949)
- Rainier III, Prince (1949–2005)

- Minister of State (complete list) –

- Émile Flach, Minister of state (1911–1917)
- Georges Jaloustre, Minister of state (1918–1919)
- Raymond Le Bourdon, Minister of state (1919–1923)
- Maurice Piette, Minister of state (1923–1932)
- Henry Mauran, Acting Minister of state (1932)
- Maurice Bouilloux-Lafont, Minister of state (1932–1937)
- Henry Mauran, Acting Minister of state (1937)
- Émile Roblot, Minister of state (1937–1944)
- Pierre Blanchy, Acting Minister of state (1944)
- Pierre de Witasse, Minister of state (1944–1949)
- Pierre Blanchy, Acting Minister of state (1949)
- Jacques Rueff, Minister of state (1949–1950)
- Pierre Voizard, Minister of state (1950–1953)

Netherlands

- Netherlands

- Monarchs (complete list) –

- Wilhelmina, Queen (1890–1948)
- Juliana, Queen (1948–1980)

- Prime ministers of the Netherlands (complete list) –

- Nicolaas Pierson, Prime minister (1897–1901)
- Abraham Kuyper, Prime minister (1901–1905)
- Theo de Meester, Prime minister (1905–1908)
- Theo Heemskerk, Prime minister (1908–1913)
- Pieter Cort van der Linden, Prime minister (1913–1918)
- Charles Ruijs de Beerenbrouck, Prime minister (1918–1925)
- Hendrikus Colijn, Prime minister (1925–1926)
- Dirk Jan de Geer, Prime minister (1926–1929)
- Charles Ruijs de Beerenbrouck, Prime minister (1929–1933)
- Hendrikus Colijn, Prime minister (1933–1939)
- Dirk Jan de Geer, Prime minister (1939–1940)
- Pieter Sjoerds Gerbrandy, Prime minister (1940–1945)
- Willem Schermerhorn, Prime minister (1945–1946)
- Louis Beel, Prime minister (1946–1948)
- Willem Drees, Prime minister (1948–1958)

- Reichskommissariat Niederlande: German-occupied Netherlands

- Reichskommissar –

- Arthur Seyss-Inquart, Reichskommissar (1940–1945)

- Leader of the Dutch People –

- Anton Mussert, Leader of the Dutch People (1942–1945)

=== Eurasia: Caucasus ===
Armenia

- First Republic of Armenia

- Chairmen (complete list) –

- Avetik Sahakyan, Chairman (1918–1919)
- Avetis Aharonian, Chairman (1919–1920)
- Hovhannes Kajaznuni, Chairman (1920)

- Prime ministers (complete list) –

- Hovhannes Kajaznuni, Prime minister (1918–1919)
- Alexander Khatisian, Prime minister (1919–1920)
- Hamo Ohanjanyan, Prime minister (1920)
- Simon Vratsian, Prime minister (1920)

Azerbaijan

- Azerbaijan Democratic Republic

- Presidents (complete list) –

- Mammad Amin Rasulzadeh, President (1918)
- Alimardan Topchubashov, Head of state (1918–1920)
- Mammad Yusif Jafarov, Acting Head of state (1920)

- Prime ministers (complete list) –

- Fatali Khan Khoyski, Prime minister (1918–1919)
- Nasib Yusifbeyli, Prime minister (1919–1920)
- Mammad Hasan Hajinski, Acting Prime minister (1920)

Georgia

- Democratic Republic of Georgia

- Prime ministers (complete list) –

- Noe Ramishvili, Prime minister (1918)
- Noe Zhordania, Prime minister (1918–1921)

== Oceania ==
=== Australia and Papua New Guinea ===
Australia

- Australia

- Monarchs (complete list) –

- Victoria, Queen (1901)
- Edward VII, King (1901–1910)
- George V, King (1910–1936)
- Edward VIII, King (1936)
- George VI, King (1936–1952)

- Prime ministers (complete list) –

- Edmund Barton, Prime minister (1901–1903)
- Alfred Deakin, Prime minister (1903–1904)
- Chris Watson, Prime minister (1904–1904)
- George Reid, Prime minister (1904–1905)
- Alfred Deakin, Prime minister (1905–1908)
- Andrew Fisher, Prime minister (1908–1909)
- Alfred Deakin, Prime minister (1909–1910)
- Andrew Fisher, Prime minister (1910–1913)
- Joseph Cook, Prime minister (1913–1914)
- Andrew Fisher, Prime minister (1914–1916)
- Billy Hughes, Prime minister (1916–1923)
- Stanley Bruce, Prime minister (1923–1929)
- James Scullin, Prime minister (1929–1932)
- Joseph Lyons, Prime minister (1932–1939)
- Sir Earle Page, Prime minister (1939–1939)
- Robert Menzies, Prime minister (1939–1941)
- Arthur Fadden, Prime minister (1941–1941)
- John Curtin, Prime minister (1941–1945)
- Frank Forde, Prime minister (1945–1945)
- Ben Chifley, Prime minister (1945–1949)
- Sir Robert Menzies, Prime minister (1949–1966)

Papua New Guinea

- German New Guinea (complete list) –

German colony, 1884–1919
For details see the German Empire under central Europe

- Territory of New Guinea (complete list) –

League of Nations Mandate of Australia, 1920–1946
United Nations Trust Territory of Australia, 1946–1975
For details see Australia

- Territory of Papua (complete list) –

British colony, 1888–1902
League of Nations Mandate of Australia, 1920–1946
United Nations Trust Territory of Australia, 1946–1975
For details see Australia or the United Kingdom under the British Isles, Europe

- Territory of Papua and New Guinea (complete list) –

New Guinea: United Nations Trust Territory of Australia, 1949–1975
Papua: Australian external territory (1949–1975)
For details see Australia

=== Pacific ===
Chile

- Easter Island (complete list) –

- Nga'ara, King (c.1835–pre-1860)
- Maurata, King (1859–1862)
- Kai Mako'i 'Iti, King (?–1863)
- Tepito, King (?)
- Gregorio, King (?)
- Atamu Tekena, King (?–pre-1892)

Fiji

- Colony of Fiji (complete list) –

British colony, 1874–1970
For details see the United Kingdom under British Isles, Europe

French Polynesia

- Wallis and Futuna

Protectorate of France, 1887/1888–1959

- Kings of Alo –

- Soane Malia Musulamu, King (c.1887–1929)

- Kingdom of Bora Bora (complete list) –
- Kingdom of Huahine (complete list) –
- Mangareva (complete list) –
- Kingdom of Raiatea (complete list) –
- Kings of Sigave

- Mateo Tamole, King
- Toviko Keletaona, King
- Tamasi Tamole, King
- Toviko Keletaona, King
- Sui Tamole, King
- Ligareto Falemaa, King (?–1929)
- Keletaona Keletaona, King (1929–1932)

- Kings of Uvea (Wallis)

- Vito Lavelua II, King (1895–1904)
- Lusiano Aisake, King (1904–1906)
- Sosefo Mautāmakia I, King (1906–1910)
- Soane-Patita Lavuia, King (1910–1916)
- Sosefo Mautāmakia II, King (1916–1918)
- Vitolo Kulihaapai, King (1918–1924)
- Tomasi Kulimoetoke I, King (1924–1928)
- Mikaele Tufele II, King (1928–1931, 1933)
- Sosefo Mautāmakia I, King (1931–1933)
- Petelo Kahofuna, King (1933)
- Council of Ministers (1933–1941)
- Leone Mahikitoga, King (1941–1947)
- Pelenato Fuluhea "Pulufegu", King (1947–1950)
- Kapeliele Tufele III "Setu", King (1950–1953)

New Zealand

- Cook Islands Federation (complete list) –

British colony, 1891–1901
For details see the United Kingdom under British Isles, Europe

- Colony of New Zealand (complete list) –

British colony, 1841–1907
For details see the United Kingdom under British Isles, Europe

- Dominion of New Zealand

- Monarchs (complete list) –

- Edward VII, King (1907–1910)
- George V, King (1910–1936)
- Edward VIII, King (1936)
- George VI, King (1936–1952)

- Prime ministers (complete list) –

- Joseph Ward, Prime minister (1906–1912)
- Thomas Mackenzie, Prime minister (1912)
- William Massey, Prime minister (1912–1925)
- Francis Bell, Prime minister (1925)
- Gordon Coates, Prime minister (1925–1928)
- Joseph Ward, Prime minister (1928–1930)
- George Forbes, Prime minister (1930–1935)
- Michael Joseph Savage, Prime minister (1935–1940)
- Peter Fraser, Prime minister (1940–1949)

- New Zealand

- Monarchs (complete list) –

- George VI, King (1936–1952)

- Prime ministers (complete list) –

- Peter Fraser, Prime minister (1940–1949)
- Sidney Holland, Prime minister (1949–1957)

- British protectorate of Niue (complete list) –

British protectorate, 1900–1907
For details see the United Kingdom under British Isles, Europe

- New Zealand protectorate of Niue (complete list) –

New Zealand protectorate, 1907–present
For details see the New Zealand under Oceania

- Kingdom of Rarotonga (complete list) –

British protectorate, 1888–1901
For details see the United Kingdom under British Isles, Europe
- Makea Takau Ariki, Queen Regnant (1871–1911)

Samoa and American Samoa

- German Samoa (complete list) –

German colony, 1900–1914
For details see the German Empire under central Europe

- Malietoa dynasty –

- Malietoa Natuitasina, Malietoa (1841–1858)
- Moli, Malietoa (1858–1860)
- Malietoa Talavou Tonumaipe'a, Malietoa (1869–1880)
- Malietoa Laupepa, Malietoa (1875–1887, 1889–1898)
- Malietoa Tanumafili I, Malietoa (1898–1939)
- Malietoa Tanumafili II, Malietoa (1940–2007), O le Ao o le Malo (Head of State), held jointly with Tupua Tamasese Mea'ole (1962–2007)

- Manuʻa Islands (complete list) –

- Elisala, Manu’a (1899–1909)

Solomon Islands

- British Solomon Islands (complete list) –

British protectorate, 1893–1978
For details see the United Kingdom under British Isles, Europe

Tuvalu

- Gilbert and Ellice Islands (complete list) –

British colony, 1892–1976
For details see the United Kingdom under British Isles, Europe

Tonga

- Tuʻi Kanokupolu of Tonga

- Monarchs (complete list) –

- George Tupou I/ Tāufaʻāhau, King (1845–1893)
- George Tupou II, King (1893–1918)

- Prime ministers (complete list) –

- Tēvita ʻUnga, Prime minister (1872–1879)
- Shirley Waldemar Baker, Prime minister (1881–1890)
- Siaosi U. Tuku'aho, Prime minister (1890–1893)
- Siosateki Veikune, Prime minister (1893–1905)

- Kingdom of Tonga (1900–70)

- Monarchs (complete list) –

- George Tupou II, King (1893–1918)
- Sālote Tupou III, King (1918–1965)

- Prime ministers (complete list) –

- Siosateki Veikune, Prime minister (1893–1905)
- Sione Mateialona, Prime minister (1905–1912)
- Tevita Tuʻivakano, Prime minister (1912–1923)
- Viliami Tungi Mailefihi, Prime minister (1923–1941)
- Solomone Ula Ata, Prime minister (1941–1949)
- Tupoutoʻa-Tungi, Prime minister (1949–1965)

United States

- Hawaiian Kingdom

- Monarchs (complete list) –

- Kamehameha III, King (1825–1854)
- Kamehameha IV, King (1855–1863)
- Kamehameha V, King (1863–1872)
- Lunalilo, King (1873–1874)
- Kalākaua, King (1874–1891)
- Liliʻuokalani, Queen (1891–1893)

- Kuhina Nui (complete list) –
- Keoni Ana, Kuhina Nui (1845–1855)
- Kaʻahumanu IV, Kuhina Nui (1855–1863)
- Mataio Kekūanaōʻa, Kuhina Nui (1863–1864)

- Provisional Government of Hawaii –

- Committee of Safety (1893–1894)

- Republic of Hawaii –

- Sanford B. Dole, President (1894–1898)

- Trust Territory of the Pacific Islands (complete list) –

United Nations Trust Territory under the administration of the United States, 1947–1994

Vanuatu

- Anglo-French Joint Naval Commission (complete list) –

British-French Protectorate, 1887–1889, 1890–1906
For details see the United Kingdom under British Isles and France under western Europe

- Franceville, New Hebrides –

- Ferdinand Chevillard, President (1889)
- R. D. Polk, President (c.1890)

- New Hebrides Condominium –

British-French Condominium, 1906–1980
For details see the United Kingdom under British Isles and France under western Europe

== See also ==
- List of state leaders in the 19th century (1851–1900)
- List of state leaders in the 20th century (1951–2000)
- List of state leaders in 20th-century British South Asia
- List of governors of dependent territories in the 20th century
