= List of sovereign states in the 1870s =

This is a list of sovereign states in the 1870s, giving an overview of states around the world during the period between 1 January 1870 and 31 December 1879. It contains entries, arranged alphabetically, with information on the status and recognition of their sovereignty. It includes widely recognized sovereign states, entities which were de facto sovereign but which were not widely recognized by other states.

== Sovereign states ==
Name and capital city	Information on status and recognition of sovereignty
=== A ===
Abemama – Kingdom of Abemama; Capital: Abemama	Widely recognized state.
Abuja – Abuja Emirate; Capital: Abuja	Widely recognized state.
Afghanistan – Emirate of Afghanistan (to 24 May 1879); Capital: Kabul	Widely recognized independent state to 24 May 1879. De-jure British protected state from 24 May 1879.
Agadez – Tenere Sultanate of Aïr; Capital: Agadez	Widely recognized state.
Alawi – Alawi Sheikhdom; Capital: Al Qasha	Widely recognized state.
Andorra – Principality of Andorra; Capital: Andorra la Vella	Widely recognized independent state. The President of France and Bishop of Urgell were ex officio Co-Princes of Andorra. The defense of Andorra was the responsibility of France and Spain.
Angoche – Angoche Sultanate; Capital: Angoche
Ankole – Kingdom of Ankole; Capital: Mbarara	Widely recognized state.
Annam – Empire of Annam; Capital: Phú Xuân	Widely recognized state. Internal imperial system within Chinese tributary.
Anziku – Anziku Kingdom (to 1875); Capital: Monsol	Widely recognized state to 1875. Annexed by France in 1875.
Aqrabi – Aqrabi Sheikhdom; Capital: Bir Ahmad	Widely recognized state.
Argentina – Argentine Republic; Capital: Buenos Aires
Aro – Aro Confederacy; Capital: Arochukwu	Widely recognized state.
Ashanti – Asante Union; Capital: Kumasi	Widely recognized state.
Aussa – Sultanate of Aussa; Capital: Aussa	Widely recognized state.
Austria-Hungary – Austro-Hungarian Empire; Capital: Vienna (Cisleithania), Budapest (Transleithania)	Widely recognized state.
=== B ===
Baden – Grand Duchy of Baden (to 18 January 1871); Capital: Karlsruhe	Widely recognized state to 18 January 1871. State of the North German Confederation to 18 January 1871. Became part of the German Empire on 18 January 1871.
Baguirmi – Kingdom of Baguirmi; Capital: Massenya	Tributary state of the Bornu Empire.
Bali – Kingdom of Bali; Capital: Klungkung	Widely recognized state. Bali was a series of kingdoms that ruled the island of Bali.
Baol – Kingdom of Baol; Capital: Diourbel	Widely recognized state.
Barotseland – Kingdom of Barotseland; Capital: Mongu	Widely recognized state.
Bavaria – Kingdom of Bavaria (to 18 January 1871); Capital: Munich	Widely recognized state to 18 January 1871. State of the North German Confederation to 18 January 1871. Became part of the German Empire on 18 January 1871.
Belgium – Kingdom of Belgium; Capital: Brussels	Widely recognized state. Belgium has sovereignty over 1 condominium: Moresnet (Condominium sui iuris of Belgium and Prussia)
Beni Abbas – Kingdom of Beni Abbas (to 1872); Capital: Kalâa of Ait Abbas	Widely recognized state to 1872. Annexed by France in 1872.
Benin – Kingdom of Benin; Capital: Edo	Widely recognized state.
Bhutan – Kingdom of Bhutan; Capital: Punakha	Widely recognized state.
Biu – Biu Kingdom; Capital: Biu	Widely recognized state.
Bohemia – Kingdom of Bohemia; Capital: Prague	Widely recognized state.
Bolivia – Republic of Bolivia; Capital: Sucre (official), La Paz (administrative)	Widely recognized state.
Bora Bora – Kingdom of Bora Bora; Capital: Nunue, Vaitape	Widely recognized state.
Bornu – Bornu Empire; Capital: Ngazargamu	Widely recognized state.
Brakna – Brakna Emirate; Capital: Aleg	Widely recognized state.
Brazil – Empire of Brazil; Capital: Rio de Janeiro	Brazil was a federation of 20 states and one federal district. (Note: 20 States: Alagoas, Amazonas, Bahia, Ceará, Espírito Santo, Goiás, Maranhão, Mato Grosso, Minas Gerais, Pará, Paraíba, Paraná, Pernambuco, Piauí, Rio Grande do Norte, Rio Grande do Sul, Rio de Janeiro, Santa Catarina, São Paulo, Sergipe. 1 Federal District: Federal District.)
Brunei – Sultanate of Brunei; Capital: Kampong Ayer	Widely recognized state.
Buganda – Kingdom of Buganda; Capital: Mengo	Widely recognized state.
Bulgaria – Principality of Bulgaria (from 1878); Capital: Sofia	De facto independent, and de jure vassal state under the suzerainty of the Ottoman Empire.
Bukhara – Emirate of Bukhara (to 1873); Capital: Bukhara	Widely recognized state to 1873. Annexed by Russia in 1873.
Bunyoro – Bunyoro-Kitara Kingdom; Capital: Hoima	Widely recognized state.
Burma – Kingdom of Burma; Capital: Mandalay	Widely recognized state.
Burundi – Kingdom of Burundi; Capital: Gitega	Widely recognized state.
Busoga – Kingdom of Busoga; Capital: Bugembe	Widely recognized state.
=== C ===
Cayor – Kingdom of Cayor; Capital: Mboul	Widely recognized state.
Chile – Republic of Chile; Capital: Santiago	Widely recognized state.
Chokwe – Chokwe Kingdom; Capital: Not specified	Widely recognized state.
→ China – Great Qing Empire; Capital: Beijing	Widely recognized state. China had sovereignty over the following territories: Lanfang Republic (Vassal state); Tibet (Protectorate) including one protectorate: Sikkim (De jure Protectorate)
Colombia – United States of Colombia; Capital: Bogotá	Widely recognized state.
Costa Rica – Republic of Costa Rica; Capital: San Jose	Widely recognized state.
=== D ===
Dagbon – Kingdom of Dagbon; Capital: Yendi	Widely recognized state.
Dahomey – Kingdom of Dahomey; Capital: Abomey	Widely recognized state.
Dai Nam – Dai Nam Realm; Capital: Phú Xuân	Widely recognized state. Tributary state of China.
Damagaram – Sultanate of Damagaram; Capital: Zinder	Widely recognized state.
Darfur – Sultanate of Darfur (to 1874); Capital: Al Fashir	Widely recognized state to 1874. Conquered by Mahdist Sudan in 1874
Denmark – Kingdom of Denmark; Capital: Copenhagen	Widely recognized state. Denmark had sovereignty over the following overseas territories: (Denmark) Danish West Indies (Colony); (Denmark) Greenland (Territory); Iceland (Dependency)
Dhala – Emirate of Dhala; Capital: Dhale	Widely recognized state.
Dominican Republic – Second Republic; Capital: Santo Domingo	Widely recognized state.
Dosso – Dosso Kingdom; Capital: Dosso	Widely recognized state.
=== E ===
Ecuador – Republic of Ecuador; Capital: Quito	Widely recognized state.
→ → El Salvador – Republic of El Salvador; Capital: San Salvador	Widely recognized state.
→ Ethiopia – Ethiopian Empire; Capital: Addis Ababa	Widely recognized state.
=== F ===
Fadhli – Fadhli Sultanate; Capital: Shuqrah	Widely recognized state.
Fante – Fante Confederacy (to 1874); Capital: Not specified	Widely recognized state to 1874. Incorporated into the Gold Coast in 1874.
France; Capital: Paris: Empire of the French (to 4 September 1870); Third French Republic (from 4 September 1870)	Widely recognized independent state. France had sovereignty over the following overseas territories: Cambodia (Protectorate); French Algeria (de jure Department of Metropolitan France, de facto Colony); (France) French Cochinchina (Colony); French Gabon (Protectorate); French Guiana (Colony); French India (Colony); French Ivory Coast (Protectorate); French Oceania – French Establishments in Oceania (Colony); Guadeloupe (Colony); Martinique (Colony); Mayotte (Colony); New Caledonia (Colony); Obock (Colony); Réunion (Colony); Saint Pierre and Miquelon (Colony); Shanghai (Concession); Tientsin (Concession)
Futa Jallon – Imamate of Futa Jallon; Capital: Timbo	Widely recognized state.
=== G ===
Garo – Kingdom of Garo; Capital: Not specified	Widely recognized state.
Gaza – Gaza Empire; Capital: Manjacaze	Widely recognized state.
Geledi – Sultanate of the Geledi; Capital: Afgooye	Widely recognized state.
Gera – Kingdom of Gera; Capital: Chala	Widely recognized state.
Germany – German Empire (from 18 January 1871); Capital: Berlin	Widely recognized state from 18 January 1871. The German Empire consisted of 25 constituent states and an imperial territory.
Gomma – Kingdom of Gomma; Capital: Agaro	Widely recognized state.
Gowa – Sultanate of Gowa; Capital: Jongaya	Widely recognized state.
Greece – Kingdom of Greece; Capital: Athens	Widely recognized state.
→ Guatemala – Republic of Guatemala; Capital: Guatemala City	Widely recognized state.
Gumma – Kingdom of Gumma; Capital: Not specified	Widely recognized state.
Gyaaman – State of Gyaaman; Capital: Sampa, Drobo	Widely recognized state.
=== H ===
Ha'il – Emirate of Jabal Shammar; Capital: Ha'il	Widely recognized state.
Haiti – Republic of Haiti; Capital: Port-au-Prince	Widely recognized state.
Harar – Emirate of Harar (to 1875); Capital: Ge	Widely recognized state to 1875. Client state of the Khedivate of Egypt from 1875.
Hawaii – Kingdom of Hawaii; Capital: Honolulu	Widely recognized state.
Hesse-Darmstadt – Grand Duchy of Hesse and by Rhine (to 18 January 1871); Capital: Darmstadt	Widely recognized state to 18 January 1871. State of the North German Confederation to 18 January 1871. Became part of the German Empire on 18 January 1871.
Hobyo – Sultanate of Hobyo (from 1878); Capital: Hobyo	Widely recognized state from 1878.
Honduras – Republic of Honduras; Capital: Tegucigalpa	Widely recognized state.
Huahine – Kingdom of Huahine; Capital: Huahine	Widely recognized state.
Hunza – State of Hunza; Capital: Baltit	Widely recognized state.
=== I ===
Igala – Igala Kingdom; Capital: Idah	Widely recognized state.
Igara – Kingdom of Igara Capital: Not specified	Widely recognized state.
Ilé-Ifẹ̀ – Ilé-Ifẹ̀ Kingdom; Capital: Ilé-Ifẹ̀	Widely recognized state.
Isaaq – Isaaq Sultanate; Capital: Hargeisa	Widely recognized state.
Italy – Kingdom of Italy; Capital: Rome	Widely recognized independent state.
=== J ===
Japan – Empire of Japan; Capital: Tokyo City	Widely recognized state. Japan had sovereignty over the following overseas territories: Hokkaido (Colony); Kuril Islands (Colony); Ryūkyū Kingdom Ryūkyū Domain (Domain, 1872 to 13 March 1879, colony thereafter)
Jimma – Kingdom of Jimma; Capital: Jiren	Widely recognized state.
Jolof – Jolof Kingdom; Capital: Ouarkhokh	Widely recognized state.
=== K ===
Kaarta – Kingdom of Kaarta; Capital: Diangounté, Nioros	Widely recognized state.
Kabulistan – Kingdom of Kabul (to 12 October 1879); Capital: Not specified	Widely recognized state to 12 October 1879.
Kaffa – Kingdom of Kaffa; Capital: Bonga, Anderaccha	Widely recognized state.
Kajara – Kajara Kingdom; Capital: Not specified	Widely recognized state.
Kakongo – Kingdom of Kakongo; Capital: Kinguele	Widely recognized state.
Kalat – Khanate of Kalat (to 1875); Capital: Kalat	Widely recognized state to 1875. Incorporated to British India in 1875.
Kasanje – Jaga Kingdom; Capital: Not specified	Widely recognized state.
Kathiri – Hadhrami Kathiri Dynasty in Seiyun; Capital: Seiyun	Widely recognized state.
Kebbi – Kebbi Emirate; Capital: Argungu	Widely recognized state.
Kénédougou – Kénédougou Kingdom; Capital: Sikasso	Widely recognized state.
Khasso – Kingdom of Khasso; Capital: Médine	Widely recognized state.
Khiva – Khanate of Khiva (to 12 August 1873); Capital: Khiva	Widely recognized state to 12 August 1873. Annexed by Russia on 12 August 1873.
Kokand – Khanate of Kokand (to 19 February 1876); Capital: Kokand	Widely recognized state to 19 February 1876.
Kong – Kong Empire; Capital: Kong	Widely recognized state.
Korea – Kingdom of Great Joseon; Capital: Seoul	Widely recognized state.
Koya Temne – Kingdom of Koya; Capital: Grand Cape Mount	Widely recognized state.
Kuba – Kingdom of Kuba; Capital: Not specified	Widely recognized state.
=== L ===
Lafia Beri-Beri – Lafia Beri-Beri Kingdom; Capital: Lafia	Widely recognized state.
Liberia – Republic of Liberia; Capital: Monrovia	Widely recognized state.
Liechtenstein – Principality of Liechtenstein; Capital: Vaduz	Widely recognized state.
Limmu-Ennarea – Kingdom of Limmu-Ennarea; Capital: Saqqa	Widely recognized state.
Loango – Kingdom of Loango; Capital: Buali	Widely recognized state.
Lower Aulaqi – Lower Aulaqi Sultanate; Capital: Ahwar	Widely recognized state.
Luba – Luba Empire; Capital: Mwibele	Widely recognized state.
Lunda – Luba Empire; Capital: Not specified	Widely recognized state.
Luxembourg – Grand Duchy of Luxembourg; Capital: Luxembourg City	Widely recognized state.
=== M ===
Maguindanao – Sultanate of Maguindanao; Capital: Kuta Watu	Widely recognized state.
Mahra – Sultanate of Mahra; Capital: Qishn	Widely recognized state.
Majeerteen Sultanate – Majeerteen Kingdom; Capital: Alula	Widely recognized state.
Mangareva – Kingdom of Mangareva; Capital: Mangareva	Widely recognized state.
Manipur – Kingdom of Manipur; Capital: Imphal	Widely recognized state.
Maravi – Kingdom of Maravi; Capital: Manthimba	Widely recognized state.
Matabeleland – Matabele Kingdom; Capital: Bulawayo	Widely recognized state.
Mbunda – Mbunda Kingdom Capital: Not specified	Widely recognized state.
Merina – Kingdom of Imerina; Capital: Antananarivo	Widely recognized state.
Mexico; Capital: Mexico City: Restored Republic (to 10 January 1876); Porfiriato (from 10 January 1876)	Widely recognized state.
Monaco – Principality of Monaco; Capital: Monaco	Widely recognized state.
Montenegro – Principality of Montenegro; Capital: Cetinje	Widely recognized state.
Morocco – Sultanate of Morocco; Capital: Fes	Widely recognized state.
Mossi Kingdoms – Mossi Empire; Capital: Multiple capitals	Widely recognized independent state. The following are a number of different kingdoms that make up the Mossi Empire: Gurunsi; Gwiriko; Liptako; Nungu; Wogodogo; Yatenga
Mthwakazi – Kingdom of Mthwakazi; Capital: Bulawayo	Widely recognized state.
Muscat and Oman – Sultanate of Muscat and Oman; Capital: Muscat	Widely recognized state.
Mutayr – Emirate of Mutayr; Capital: Not specified	Widely recognized state.
=== N ===
Najran – Principality of Najran; Capital: Najran	Widely recognized state.
Negeri Sembilan; Capital: Seremban	Widely recognized state.
Nejd – Emirate of Nejd; Capital: Riyadh	Widely recognized state.
Nepal – Kingdom of Nepal; Capital: Kathmandu	Widely recognized state.
Netherlands – Kingdom of The Netherlands; Capital: Amsterdam	Widely recognized state.
Nicaragua – Republic of Nicaragua; Capital: Managua	Widely recognized state.
Niue – Kingdom of Niue-Fekai; Capital: Not specified	Widely recognized state.
North German Confederation (to 18 January 1871); Capital: Berlin	Widely recognized state to 18 January 1871. Incorporated to the German Empire on 18 January 1871.
Nri – Kingdom of Nri; Capital: Igbo-Ukwu	Widely recognized state.
Nshenyi – Nshenyi Kingdom; Capital: Not specified	Widely recognized state.
=== O ===
Obwera – Obwera Kingdom; Capital: Not specified	Widely recognized state.
Onitsha – Onitsha Kingdom; Capital: Onitsha	Widely recognized state.
Orange Free State; Capital: Bloemfontein	Widely recognized state.
Oron – Oron Nation; Capital: Oron	Widely recognized state.
Orungu – Kingdom of Orungu (to 1873); Capital: Not specified	Widely recognized state to 1873. Annexed by France in 1873.
Ottoman Empire – Sublime Ottoman State; Capital: Constantinople	Widely recognized state. The following are autonomous territories of the Ottoman Empire: Egypt (De jure Autonomous vassal under de facto British occupation); Kuwait (Vassal state); Mecca (Non-sovereign state); Qatar (De facto autonomous Kazak); Samos (Autonomous state); Tunis (Vassal state; De facto Independent state)
Oyo – Oyo Empire; Capital: Oyo-Ile	Widely recognized state.
=== P ===
Pahang – Sultanate of Pahang; Capital: Pekan	Widely recognized state.
Papal States – State of the Church (to 20 September 1870); Capital: Rome	Widely recognized state. Annexed by the Kingdom of Italy on 20 September 1870.
Paraguay – Republic of Paraguay; Capital: Asunción	Widely recognized state.
Pate – Pate Sultanate (to 1870); Capital: Faza	Widely recognized state.
Patani – Sultanate of Patani; Capital: Patani	Widely recognized state.
Perak – Sultanate of Perak (to 20 January 1874); Capital: Ipoh	Widely recognized state. Annexed by the United Kingdom on 20 January 1874.
Persia – Sublime State of Persia; Capital: Tehran	Widely recognized state.
Peru; Capital: Lima: Peruvian Republic (to 2 November 1879); Chilean occupation of Peru (from 2 November 1879)	Widely recognized state to 2 November 1879. De facto independent state from 2 November 1879.
Portugal – Kingdom of Portugal; Capital: Lisbon	Widely recognized state. The following are colonies, vassal state and possession of Portugal: Portuguese Cape Verde (Colony); Portuguese East Africa (Colony); Portuguese Guinea (Colony); Portuguese India (Colony); Portuguese Macau (Colony); Portuguese São Tomé and Príncipe (Colony); Portuguese Timor (Colony); Portuguese West Africa (Colony); Fort of São João Baptista de Ajudá (Possession)
Potiskum – Potiskum Emirate; Capital: Potiskum	Widely recognized state.
=== Q ===
Qu'aiti – Qu'aiti Sultanate of Shihr and Mukalla; Capital: Al-Shihr	Widely recognized state.
=== R ===
Raiatea – Kingdom of Raiatea; Capital: Uturoa	Widely recognized state.
Rapa Nui – Kingdom of Rapa Nui; Capital: Anakena	Widely recognized state.
Rarotonga – Kingdom of Rarotonga; Capital: Anakena	Widely recognized state.
Romania – Romanian United Principalities; Capital: Bucharest	Widely recognized state.
Rujumbura – Rujumbura Kingdom; Capital: Not specified	Widely recognized state.
Rukiga – Rukiga Kingdom; Capital: Not specified	Widely recognized state.
Russia – Russian Empire; Capital: Saint Petersburg	Widely recognized state.
Rwanda – Kingdom of Rwanda; Capital: Nyanza	Widely recognized state.
(Ryukyu Kingdom) Ryūkyū (to 13 March 1872); Capital: Shuri: Ryūkyū Kingdom (to 13 March 1872); Ryūkyū Domain - Under Japanese control (1872 to 13 March 1879)	Widely recognized state to 1972. Annexed by Japan on 27 March 1879
=== S ===
→ Samoa – Kingdom of Samoa; Capital: Apia	Widely recognized state.
San Marino – Most Serene Republic of San Marino; Capital: San Marino	Widely recognized state.
→ Sarawak – Kingdom of Sarawak; Capital: Kuching	Widely recognized state.
→ Selangor – Sultanate of Selangor (to 1875); Capital: Klang	Widely recognized state to 1875. Annexed by the United Kingdom in 1875.
Serbia – Principality of Serbia (from 1878); Capital: Belgrade	Widely recognized state.
Setul Mambang Segara – Kingdom of Setul Mambang Segara; Capital: Kota Mambang Segara	Widely recognized state.
(Thailand) Siam – Kingdom of Siam; Capital: Bangkok	Widely recognized state. The following are vassal states of Siam: Kedah (Vassal state); Luang Phrabang (Vassal state); Perlis (Vassal state)
Sokoto – Sokoto Caliphate; Capital: Sokoto	Widely recognized state.
→ → Spain; Capital: Madrid: Kingdom of Spain (to 11 February 1873); Spanish Republic (from 11 February 1873 to 29 December 1874); Kingdom of Spain (from 29 December 1874)	Widely recognized state. Spain had three colonies, and two possessions: (Spain) → (Spain) → (Spain) Elobey, Annobón and Corisco (Colony); (Spain) → (Spain) → (Spain) Fernando Po (Colony); (Spain) → (Spain) → (Spain) Río Muni (Colony); (Spain) → (Spain) → (Spain) Spanish North Africa (Possession)
→ Sulu – Sultanate of Sulu; Capital: Maimbung	Widely recognized state.
Sweden and Norway – United Kingdoms of Sweden and Norway; Capital: Stockholm, Christiania	Personal union of the separate kingdoms of Sweden and Norway.
Switzerland – Swiss Confederation; Capital: Bern	Widely recognized state. Switzerland was a federation of 25 cantons. (Note: 25 Cantons: Aargau, Appenzell Ausserrhoden, Appenzell Innerrhoden, Basel-Stadt, Basel-Landschaft, Bern, Fribourg, Geneva, Glarus, Graubünden, Lucerne, Neuchâtel, Nidwalden, Obwalden, Schaffhausen, Schwyz, Solothurn, St. Gallen, Thurgau, Ticino, Uri, Valais, Vaud, Zug, Zürich)
=== T ===
Tagant – Emirate of Tagant; Capital: Tidjikja	Widely recognized state.
Tahiti – Kingdom of Tahiti; Capital: Tidjikja	Widely recognized state.
Tonga – Kingdom of Tonga; Capital: Nuku'alofa	Widely recognized state.
Tooro – Tooro Kingdom (to 1876); Capital: Kabarole	Widely recognized state to 1876. Absorbed by Bunyoro-Kitara in 1876
Toucouleur – Toucouleur Empire; Capital: Segou	Widely recognized state.
Transvaal – South African Republic (until 12 April, 1877); Capital: Pretoria	Largely independent Boer republic under limited British suzerainty. British colony from 12 April, 1877.
Trarza – Emirate of Trarza; Capital: Mederdra	Widely recognized state.
Tuggurt – Sultanate of Tuggurt; Capital: Tuggurt	Widely recognized state.
=== U ===
United Kingdom – United Kingdom of Great Britain and Ireland; Capital: London	Widely recognized state. The following are colonies, territories, dependencies and protectorates of the United Kingdom: (United Kingdom) Aden (Protectorate from 1872); Afghanistan (Protectorate under Treaty of Gandamak from 24 May 1879); (United Kingdom) Amoy (Concession); (United Kingdom) Ascension Island (Possession); Bahama Islands (Crown colony); Bahrain (Protectorate); (United Kingdom) Baker Island (Uninhabited possession); Barotseland (Protectorate); Bermuda (Crown colony); (United Kingdom) Bights of Benin and Biafra (Protectorate); (United Kingdom) British Arctic Territories (Territory); (United Kingdom) → British Ceylon (Crown colony); (United Kingdom) British Columbia (Colony until 1871); (United Kingdom) British Cyprus (Protectorate from 1878); (United Kingdom) → British Guiana (Colony); (United Kingdom) → British Honduras (Crown colony); (United Kingdom) → → British Hong Kong (Crown colony); (United Kingdom) → British Jamaica (Crown colony); (United Kingdom) → British Leeward Islands (Federal colony); British Mauritius (Crown colony); British West Africa (Crown colony); (United Kingdom) → British Windward Islands (Crown colony); Canada (Dominion); Cape Colony (Colony); Cocos Islands (Possession); → Colony of Natal (Colony); (United Kingdom) Dominica (Colony until 1871); Falkland Islands (Crown colony); Gibraltar (Crown colony); (United Kingdom) Graham Land (Uninhabited possession); Griqualand East (Colony from 1874 to 1879); Griqualand West (Colony from 1871); Guernsey (Crown dependency); (United Kingdom) Hankou (Concession); (United Kingdom) Heard Island and McDonald Islands (Uninhabited possession); (United Kingdom) Heligoland (Protectorate); (United Kingdom) British Raj - Indian Empire (Crown colony); (United Kingdom) Isle of Man (Crown dependency); (United Kingdom) Jarvis Island (Uninhabited possession); Jersey (Crown dependency); (United Kingdom) Lagos (Colony); Maldive Islands (Protectorate); → Malta (Crown colony); Manipur (Protectorate); Mosquito Coast (Under British influence); Muscat and Oman (Protectorate); Nepal (Protectorate); → Newfoundland (Crown colony); (United Kingdom) → → New South Wales (Colony); (United Kingdom) New Zealand (Colony); (United Kingdom) Niger Districts (Protectorate); (United Kingdom) North-Western Territory (Territory until 1870); (United Kingdom) Prince Edward Island (Colony until 1873); (United Kingdom) → → Queensland (Colony); (United Kingdom) Redonda (Possession); (United Kingdom) Rupert's Land (Territory until 1870); (United Kingdom) → Saint Helena (Crown colony); (United Kingdom) Saint Lucia (Crown colony); (United Kingdom) Saint Vincent (Crown colony); (United Kingdom) → → South Australia (Colony); → Straits Settlements (Crown colony); (United Kingdom) → → Tasmania (Colony); (United Kingdom) Tientsin (Concession); (United Kingdom) Transvaal Colony (Crown colony from 1877); (United Kingdom) Trinidad (Colony); (United Kingdom) Tristan da Cunha (Crown colony); Trucial States (Protectorate); (United Kingdom) Turks and Caicos Islands (Colony until 1874); (United Kingdom) → → Victoria (Colony); (United Kingdom) Victoria Land (Uninhabited possession); (United Kingdom) Walvis Bay (Protectorate from 1878); → Western Australia (Colony)
→ United States – United States of America; Capital: Washington D.C.	Widely recognized state. The following are territories of the United States of America: → Arizona (Territory); → Bajo Nuevo Bank (Uninhabited territory); → Dakota (Territory); → Idaho (Territory); → Indian Territory (Territory); → Johnston Atoll (Uninhabited territory); → Kingman Reef (Uninhabited territory); → Middlebrook Island (Uninhabited territory); → Midway Atoll (Uninhabited territory); → Montana (Territory); → Navassa Island (Uninhabited territory); → New Mexico (Territory); → Quita Sueño Bank (Uninhabited territory); → Roncador Bank (Uninhabited territory); → Serrana Bank (Uninhabited territory); → Serranilla Bank (Uninhabited territory); → Swan Islands (Uninhabited territory); → (United States) Tientsin (Concession); → Utah (Territory); → Washington (Territory); → Wyoming (Territory)
Upper Aulaqi Sultanate (until January 1875); Capital: Nişāb	Widely recognized state until January 1875. Became part of the Aden Protectorate.
Upper Aulaqi Sheikhdom; Capital: Sa'id	Widely recognized state.
Upper Yafa – State of Upper Yafa; Capital: Mahjaba	Widely recognized state.
Uruguay – Eastern Republic of Uruguay; Capital: Montevideo	Widely recognized state.
=== V ===
Venezuela – United States of Venezuela; Capital: Caracas	Widely recognized state.
=== W ===
Wadai – Wadai Empire; Capital: Abéché	Widely recognized state.
Wahidi Balhaf – Wahidi Sultanate of Balhaf; Capital: Balhaf	Widely recognized state.
Wahidi Bir Ali – Wahidi Sultanate of Bir Ali; Capital: Bi'r `Ali	Widely recognized state.
Wahidi Haban – Wahidi Sultanate of Haban; Capital: Habban	Widely recognized state.
Wajoq – Kingdom of Wajoq; Capital: Tosora	Widely recognized state.
Wassoulou – Wassoulou Empire (from 1878); Capital: Bissandugu	Widely recognized state from 1878.
Wituland – Witu Sultanate; Capital: Witu	Widely recognized state.
Wolaita – Kingdom of Wolaita; Capital: Lasho, Dalbo, Sodo	Widely recognized state.
Württemberg – Kingdom of Württemberg (to 18 January 1871); Capital: Stuttgart	Widely recognized state up to 18 January 1871. Became part of the German Empire on 18 January 1871.
=== Y ===
Yamma – Kingdom of Yamma; Capital: Fofa	Widely recognized state.
Yeke – Yeke Kingdom; Capital: Bunkeya	Widely recognized state.
=== Z ===
Zabarma – Zabarma Emirate; Capital: Not specified	Widely recognized state.
Zanzibar – Sultanate of Zanzibar; Capital: Stone Town	Widely recognized state.
Zululand – Kingdom of Zulu; Capital: Bulawayo	Widely recognized state.
== States with limited independence, recognition or sovereignty ==
Aceh – Sultanate of Aceh; Capital: Kutaraja	Protectorate of the Ottoman Empire.
(United Kingdom) Aden – Aden Protectorate (from 1872) (Capital: Various)	British protectorate from 1872. The Aden Protectorate was made up of two sheikdoms. (Note: Upper Aulaqi (from January 1875) and Lower Yafa (from 1872))
Assiniboia – Provisional Government of Assiniboia (to 1870); Capital: Batoche	Unrecognized state, Provisional Government. Claimed by the Dominion of Canada.
Bulungan – Sultanate of Bulungan; Capital: Tanjung Palas	Widely recognized state. Vassal state of Sulu.
Canada – Dominion of Canada; Capital: Ottawa	Autonomous Dominion of the United Kingdom. Canada was largely represented by the UK internationally and had little recognition as an independent state. Canada was a federation made up of seven provinces and two territories. (Note: 7 provinces: British Columbia (from 20 July, 1871), New Brunswick, Nova Scotia, Manitoba (from July 15, 1870), Ontario, Prince Edward Island (from July 1, 1873), Quebec. 2 territories: Keewatin (from 1876), North-west Territories (from July 15, 1870).)
Cartagena – Canton of Cartagena (from 12 July 1873 to 13 January 1874); Capital: Cartagena	Unrecognized state. Claimed by the First Spanish Republic.
Champasak – Kingdom of Champasak; Capital: Champasak	Vassal state of Siam.
Cuba – Republic of Cuba (to 28 May 1878); Capital: Havana	Unrecognized state.
Dar al Kuti – Sultanate of Dar Al Kuti; Capital: N'Délé	Widely recognized state. Vassal state of Dar Runga.
Fiji – Kingdom of Fiji (from 5 June 1871 to 10 October 1874); Capital: Suva	Unrecognized state. Claimed by the United Kingdom on 10 October 1874.
Goust – Republic of Goust; Capital: None	Unrecognized state.
Griqualand East (to 1874); Capital: Kokstad	Unrecognized state. Annexed by the United Kingdom in 1874.
Kano – Emirate of Kano; Capital: Takai	Vassal of the Sokoto Caliphate
Kongo – Kingdom of Kongo; Capital: Mbanza-Kongo	Vassal of the Kingdom of Portugal.
Lower Yafa – Sultanate of Lower Yafa; Capital: Jaʿār Until 1872	Protectorate of the United Kingdom. Formed the Aden Protectorate in 1872.
Málaga – Canton of Málaga (from 18 July 1873 to 19 September 1873); Capital: Málaga	Unrecognized state. Claimed by the First Spanish Republic.
Maldives – Sultanate of Maldive Islands; Capital: Malé	De facto British protectorate.
Paris – Paris Commune (from 18 March 1871 to 28 May 1871); Capital: None	Unrecognized state. Claimed by the French Republic.
Tamrash – Republic of Tamrash (from 1878); Capital: Málaga	Unrecognized state. Self-governing administrative structure of the Pomaks.
Valencia – Canton of Valencia (from 18 July 1873 to 8 August 1873); Capital: Valencia	Unrecognized state. Claimed by the First Spanish Republic.
Xibei San Ma; Capital: None	Unrecognized state.
→ Yettishar – Kingdom of Kashgaria (to 18 December 1877); Capital: Kashgar	Unrecognized state. Vassal of the Ottoman Empire from 1873 to 18 December 1877.
