= List of sovereign states in the 1890s =

This is a list of sovereign states in the 1890s, giving an overview of states around the world during the period between 1 January 1890 and 31 December 1899. It contains entries, arranged alphabetically, with information on the status and recognition of their sovereignty. It includes widely recognized sovereign states, and entities which were de facto sovereign but which were not widely recognized by other states.

== Sovereign states ==
Name and capital city	Information on status and recognition of sovereignty
=== A ===
Abemama – Kingdom of Abemama (to 1892); Capital: Abemama	Widely recognized independent state until 1892. Annexed by the United Kingdom and incorporated into the Gilbert and Ellice Islands in 1892.
Aboh – Kingdom of Aboh; Capital: Aboh	Widely recognized independent state.
Abuja – Abuja Emirate; Capital: Abuja	Widely recognized independent state.
Agadez – Tenere Sultanate of Aïr; Capital: Agadez	Widely recognized independent state.
Alawi – Alawi Sheikhdom (until July 1895); Capital: Al Qasha	Widely recognized independent state until July 1895. Annexed by the United Kingdom and incorporated into the Aden Protectorate in July 1895.
Andorra – Principality of Andorra; Capital: Andorra la Vella	Widely recognized independent state. The President of France and Bishop of Urgell were ex officio Co-Princes of Andorra. The defense of Andorra was the responsibility of France and Spain.
Angoche – Angoche Sultanate; Capital: Angoche	Widely recognized independent state.
Ankole – Kingdom of Ankole; Capital: Mbarara	Widely recognized independent state.
Aqrabi – Aqrabi Sheikhdom (until 26 February 1890); Capital: Bir Ahmad	Widely recognized independent state until 26 February 1890. Annexed by the United Kingdom and incorporated into the Aden Protectorate on 26 February 1890.
Argentina – Argentine Republic; Capital: Buenos Aires	Widely recognized independent state. Argentina is a federation of 23 provinces and an autonomous city.
Aro – Aro Confederacy; Capital: Arochukwu	Widely recognized independent state.
Ashanti – Asante Union; Capital: Kumasi	Widely recognized independent state.
Aussa – Sultanate of Aussa; Capital: Aussa	Widely recognized independent state.
Austria-Hungary – Austro-Hungarian Empire; Capital: Vienna (Cisleithania), Budapest (Transleithania)	Widely recognized independent state. Austria-Hungary is a constitutional dual monarchy formed by the Empire of Austria (Cisleithania) and the Kingdom of Hungary (Transleithania). The following are Crown Lands of Austria-Hungary: Bohemia (Crown land of Cisleithania); Bukovina (Crown land of Cisleithania); Carinthia (Crown land of Cisleithania); Carniola (Crown land of Cisleithania); Croatia-Slavonia (Crown land of Transleithania); Dalmatia (Crown land of Cisleithania); Fiume (Crown land of Transleithania); Galicia and Lodomeria (Crown land of Cisleithania); Gorizia and Gradisca (Crown land of Cisleithania); Hungary (Crown land of Transleithania); Istria (Crown land of Cisleithania); Kraków (Crown land of Cisleithania); Lower Austria (Crown land of Cisleithania); Moravia (Crown land of Cisleithania); Salzburg (Crown land of Cisleithania); Silesia (Crown land of Cisleithania); Styria (Crown land of Cisleithania); Trieste (Crown land of Cisleithania); Tyrol (Crown land of Cisleithania); Upper Austria (Crown land of Cisleithania); Vorarlberg (Crown land of Cisleithania)
=== B ===
Baguirmi – Kingdom of Baguirmi (to 20 September 1897); Capital: Massenya (to 1893), Chekna (from 1893 to 1897)	Tributary state of the Bornu Empire. Annexed by France and incorporated into French Chad on 20 September 1897.
Bali – Kingdom of Bali; Capital: Klungkung	Widely recognized independent state. Bali was a series of kingdoms that ruled the island of Bali.
Baol – Kingdom of Baol (to 1895); Capital: Diourbel	Widely recognized independent state until 1895. Annexed by France and incorporated into French Senegal in 1895.
Barotseland – Kingdom of Barotseland (to 1899); Capital: Mongu	Widely recognized independent state until 1899. Gradually became a British protectorate through the decade before being annexed by the United Kingdom in 1899.
Beihan – Emirate of Beihan (to January 1904); Capital: Suq Abdulla, (now Beihan)	Widely recognized independent state.
Belgium – Kingdom of Belgium; Capital: Brussels	Widely recognized independent state.
Benin – Kingdom of Benin (to 18 February 1897); Capital: Edo	Widely recognized independent state until 18 February 1897. Annexed by the United Kingdom and incorporated into the Southern Nigeria Protectorate on 18 February 1897.
Bhutan – Kingdom of Bhutan; Capital: Punakha	Widely recognized independent state.
Biu – Biu Kingdom; Capital: Biu	Widely recognized independent state.
Bolivia; Capital: Sucre (official), La Paz (administrative): Republic of Bolivia (to April 12, 1899); Republic of Bolivia (from October 25, 1899)	Widely recognized independent state.
Bora Bora – Kingdom of Bora Bora (to 21 September 1895); Capital: Nunue, Vaitape	Widely recognized independent state until 21 September 1895. Annexed by France and incorporated into French Polynesia on 21 September 1895.
Bornu – Bornu Empire (to 1893); Capital: Ngazargamu	Widely recognized independent state until 1893. Annexed by France and incorporated into French Chad in 1893.
Brakna – Brakna Emirate; Capital: Aleg	Widely recognized independent state.
Brazil – Republic of the United States of Brazil; Capital: Rio de Janeiro	Brazil was a federation of 20 states, one territory, and one federal district. (Note: 20 States: Alagoas, Amazonas, Bahia, Ceará, Espírito Santo, Goiás, Maranhão, Mato Grosso, Minas Gerais, Pará, Paraíba, Paraná, Pernambuco, Piauí, Rio Grande do Norte, Rio Grande do Sul, Rio de Janeiro, Santa Catarina, São Paulo, Sergipe. 1 Territory: Acre (from April 30, 1904). 1 Federal District: Federal District.)
Buganda – Kingdom of Buganda (to 1894); Capital: Mengo, Uganda	Widely recognized independent state until 1894. Annexed by the United Kingdom and incorporated into the Protectorate of Uganda in 1894.
Bunyoro – Bunyoro-Kitara Kingdom (to 1899); Capital: Hoima	Widely recognized independent state to 1899. Annexed by the United Kingdom in 1899.
Burundi – Kingdom of Burundi (to 1 July 1890); Capital: Gitega, Bujumbura	Widely recognized independent state to 1 July 1890. Annexed by Germany and incorporated into German East Africa on 1 July 1890.
Busoga – Kingdom of Busoga; Capital: Bugembe	Widely recognized independent state.
Buton – Sultanate of Buton; Capital: Baubau	Widely recognized independent state.
=== C ===
→ Central America (from 15 September 1896 to 21 November 1898); Capital: Amapala: Greater Republic of Central America (from 15 September 1896 to 1 November 1898); United States of Central America (from 1 to 21 November 1898)	A Political union between El Salvador, Honduras, and Nicaragua until 21 November 1898.
Chile – Republic of Chile; Capital: Santiago	Widely recognized independent state.
China – Great Qing Empire; Capital: Beijing	Widely recognized independent state.
Chokwe – Chokwe Kingdom; Capital: Not specified	Widely recognized independent state.
Colombia – Republic of Colombia; Capital: Bogotá	Widely recognized independent state.
Congo – Congo Free State; Capital: Boma	Widely recognized independent state. State in personal union with the Kingdom of Belgium.
Costa Rica – Republic of Costa Rica; Capital: San Jose	Widely recognized independent state.
=== D ===
Dahomey – Kingdom of Dahomey (to 20 January 1894); Capital: Abomey	Widely recognized independent state to 20 January 1894. Annexed by France and incorporated into French West Africaon 20 January 1894.
Dar Masalit – Sultanate of Dar Masalit; Capital: El Geneina	Widely recognized independent state.
Darfur – Sultanate of Darfur (from 1898); Capital: Al Fashir	Widely recognized independent state from 1898.
Dathina – Dathina Sheikhdom; Capital: Mudiyah	Widely recognized independent state.
Dendi – Dendi Kingdom; Capital: Lulami	Widely recognized independent state.
Denmark – Kingdom of Denmark; Capital: Copenhagen	Widely recognized independent state. Denmark had sovereignty over the following overseas territories: (Denmark) Danish West Indies (Colony); (Denmark) Greenland Territory); Iceland (Dependency)
Dhala – Emirate of Dhala; Capital: Dhala	Widely recognized independent state.
Dominican Republic – Second Republic; Capital: Santo Domingo	Widely recognized independent state.
=== E ===
Ecuador – Republic of Ecuador; Capital: Quito	Widely recognized independent state.
El Salvador – Republic of El Salvador (to 15 September 1896; from 21 November 1898); Capital: San Salvador	Widely recognized independent state to 15 September 1896, and from 21 November 1898. Part of the political union of Central America from 15 September 1896 to 21 November 1898.
→ Ethiopia – Ethiopian Empire; Capital: Addis Ababa	Widely recognized independent state.
=== F ===
France – French Republic; Capital: Paris	Widely recognized independent state. France had sovereignty over the following overseas territories: Comoros (Protectorate); French Algeria (de jure Department of Metropolitan France, de facto Colony); French Congo (Colony); French Dahomey (Colony from 1894 to 1894); French Gabon (Protectorate); French Guiana (Colony); French Guinea (Colony from 1891 to October 27, 1895); French India (Colony); French Indochina (Colony); French Ivory Coast (Protectorate to March 10, 1893 and Colony from March 10, 1893); French Madagascar (Colony from February 28, 1897); French Oceania - French Establishments in Oceania (Colony); French Somaliland (Colony); French West Africa (Federation of colonies from October 27, 1895); Futa Jallon (Protectorate from November 18, 1896); Guadeloupe (Colony); Guangzhouwan (Leased territory of France from May 29, 1898); Hankou (Concession from 1896); Laos (Protectorate from October 3, 1893 to April 19, 1899); → Malagasy Protectorate (Protectorate to February 28, 1897); Martinique (Colony); Mayotte (Colony); New Caledonia (Colony); Obock (Colony to May 20, 1896); Réunion (Colony); Saint Pierre and Miquelon (Colony); Shanghai (Concession); Tientsin (Concession); Tunisia - Tunisian Realm (Protectorate); Upper River (Colony renamed to French Sudan in 1890 to October 27, 1895)
→ Futa Jallon – Imamate of Futa Jallon (to 18 November 1896); Capital: Timbo	Widely recognized independent state to 18 November 1896. Annexed by France and became a protectorate on 18 November 1896.
=== G ===
Gaza – Gaza Empire (to 1895); Capital: Manjacaze	Widely recognized independent state to 1895. Annexed by Portugal and incorporated into Portuguese Mozambique in 1895.
Geledi – Sultanate of the Geledi; Capital: Afgooye	Widely recognized independent state.
Germany – German Empire; Capital: Berlin	Widely recognized independent state. Germany had sovereignty over the following overseas territories: German East Africa (Colony); German New Guinea (Colony); German South West Africa (Colony); German West Africa (Colony); Hankou (Concession from 1895); Kamerun (Colony); Kiautschou Bay (Concession from March 6, 1898); Tientsin (Concession from 1895); Togoland (Concession); Wituland (Protectorate to 1890)
Gowa – Sultanate of Gowa; Capital: Jongaya	Widely recognized independent state.
Greece – Kingdom of Greece; Capital: Athens	Widely recognized independent state.
Guatemala – Republic of Guatemala; Capital: Guatemala City	Widely recognized independent state.
Gyaaman – State of Gyaaman (to 1895); Capital: Sampa, Drobo	Widely recognized independent state until 1895. Gyaaman was partitioned and incorporated into two different colonies in 1895: French West Africa of France, and British Gold Coast of the United Kingdom.
=== H ===
Ha'il – Emirate of Jabal Shammar; Capital: Ha'il	Widely recognized independent state.
Haiti – Republic of Haiti; Capital: Port-au-Prince	Widely recognized independent state.
Hawaii; Capital: Honolulu: Kingdom of Hawaii (to 17 January 1893); Provisional Government of Hawaii (from 17 January 1893 to 4 July 1894); Republic of Hawaii (from 4 July 1894 to 12 August 1898)	Widely recognized independent state until 12 August 1898. Annexed by the United States on 12 August 1898.
Honduras – Republic of Honduras (to to 15 September 1896; from 21 November 1898); Capital: Tegucigalpa	Widely recognized independent state until 15 September 1896, and from 21 November 1898. Part of the political union of Central America from 15 September 1896 to 21 November 1898.
Huahine – Kingdom of Huahine (to 15 September 1895); Capital: Huahine	Widely recognized independent state until 15 September 1895. Annexed by France and incorporated into French Polynesia on 15 September 1895.
Hunza – State of Hunza (to 1892); Capital: Baltit	Widely recognized independent state to 1892. Annexed by the United Kingdom and became a princely state of British India in 1892.
=== I ===
Igala – Igala Kingdom; Capital: Idah	Widely recognized independent state.
Igara – Kingdom of Igara Capital: Not specified	Widely recognized independent state.
Ilé-Ifẹ̀ – Ilé-Ifẹ̀ Kingdom; Capital: Ilé-Ifẹ̀	Widely recognized independent state.
Italy – Kingdom of Italy; Capital: Rome	Widely recognized independent state. Italy had sovereignty over the following overseas territories: Italian Eritrea (Colony); Italian Somaliland (Colony)
=== J ===
Japan – Empire of Japan; Capital: Tokyo City	Widely recognized independent state. Japan had sovereignty over the following overseas territories: Chongqing (Concession from 1897); Hangzhou (Concession from 1897); Hankou (Concession from 1898); Hokkaido (Colony); Kuril Islands (Colony); Minami-Tori-shima (Colony from 1898); Nanpō Islands (Colony from 1891); Ryukyu Islands (Colony); Shashi (Concession from 1898); Suzhou (Concession from 1897); Taiwan (Colony from 17 April 1895); Tientsin (Concession from 1898)
=== K ===
Kaffa – Kingdom of Kaffa (to 11 September 1897); Capital: Bonga, Anderaccha	Widely recognized independent state to 11 September 1897. Annexed by the Ethiopian Empire on 11 September 1897.
Kajara – Kajara Kingdom; Capital: Not specified	Widely recognized independent state.
Kasanje – Jaga Kingdom; Capital: Not specified	Widely recognized independent state.
Kebbi – Kebbi Emirate; Capital: Argungu	Widely recognized independent state.
Kénédougou – Kénédougou Kingdom (to 1 May 1898); Capital: Sikasso	Widely recognized independent state to 1 May 1898. Annexed by France and incorporated into French Sudan on 1 May 1898.
Kong – Kong Empire (to 1898); Capital: Kong	Widely recognized independent state to 1898. Burnt down in 1898. Annexed by France and incorproated into French West Africa in 1898.
→ Korea; Capital: Hanseong: Kingdom of Great Joseon (to 12 October 1897); Korean Empire (from 12 October 1897)	Tributary state of the Qing dynasty to 1894. Widely recognized independent state from 12 October 1897.
Koya Temne – Kingdom of Koya (to 31 August 1896); Capital: Grand Cape Mount	Widely recognized independent state to 31 August 1896. Annexed by the United Kingdom and incorporated into the Sierra Leone Colony on 31 August 1896.
=== L ===
Lafia Beri-Beri – Lafia Beri-Beri Kingdom; Capital: Lafia	Widely recognized independent state.
Liberia – Republic of Liberia; Capital: Monrovia	Widely recognized independent state.
Liechtenstein – Principality of Liechtenstein; Capital: Vaduz	Widely recognized independent state.
Limmu-Ennarea – Kingdom of Limmu-Ennarea (to 1891); Capital: Saqqa	Widely recognized independent state until 1891. Annexed by the Ethiopian Empire in 1891.
Luxembourg – Grand Duchy of Luxembourg; Capital: Luxembourg City	Widely recognized independent state.
=== M ===
Manipur – Kingdom of Manipur (to 1891); Capital: Imphal	Widely recognized independent state until 1891. Annexed by the United Kingdom and became a princely state of British India in 1891.
Maravi – Kingdom of Maravi (to 1891); Capital: Manthimba	Widely recognized independent state until 1891. Annexed by the United Kingdom and incorporated into the British Central Africa Protectorate in 1891.
Matabeleland – Matabele Kingdom (to 1897); Capital: Bulawayo	Widely recognized independent state until 1897. Annexed by the United Kingdom and incorporated into Rhodesia in 1897.
Mbunda – Mbunda Kingdom; Capital: Not specified	Widely recognized independent state.
Merina – Kingdom of Imerina (to 1897); Capital: Antananarivo	Widely recognized independent state until 1897. Annexed by France and incorporated into French Madagascar in 1897.
→ Mexico – United Mexican States; Capital: Mexico City	Widely recognized independent state.
Monaco – Principality of Monaco; Capital: Monaco	Widely recognized independent state.
Montenegro – Principality of Montenegro; Capital: Cetinje	Widely recognized independent state.
Morocco – Sultanate of Morocco; Capital: Fes	Widely recognized independent state.
Mossi Kingdoms – Mossi Empire (to 1896); Capital: Multiple capitals	Widely recognized independent state until 1896. Annexed by France and incorporated into French Upper Volta in 1896. The following are a number of different kingdoms that make up the Mossi Empire: Gurunsi; Gwiriko; Liptako; Nungu; Wogodogo; Yatenga
Mutayr – Emirate of Mutayr; Capital: Not specified	Widely recognized independent state.
=== N ===
Najran – Principality of Najran; Capital: Najran	Widely recognized independent state.
Ndzuwani – Ndzuwani Sultanate; Capital: Domoni	Widely recognized independent state.
Negeri Sembilan (to 1895); Capital: Seremban	Widely recognized independent state until 1895. Annexed by the United Kingdom and federated in to the Federated Malay States in 1895.
Nepal – Kingdom of Nepal; Capital: Kathmandu	Widely recognized independent state.
Netherlands – Kingdom of The Netherlands; Capital: Amsterdam	Widely recognized independent state. The Netherlands had sovereignty over three colonies: Curaçao and Dependencies; Dutch East Indies; Surinam
→ → Nicaragua – Republic of Nicaragua (to September 15, 1896; from November 21, 1898); Capital: Managua	Widely recognized independent state until 15 September . Part of the political union of Central America from September 15, 1896 to November 21, 1898.
Nri – Kingdom of Nri; Capital: Igbo-Ukwu	Widely recognized independent state.
Nshenyi – Nshenyi Kingdom; Capital: Not specified	Widely recognized independent state.
=== O ===
Obwera – Obwera Kingdom; Capital: Not specified	Widely recognized independent state.
Onitsha – Onitsha Kingdom; Capital: Onitsha	Widely recognized independent state.
Orange Free State; Capital: Bloemfontein	Widely recognized independent state. Independent Boer sovereign republic under the British suzerainty in South Africa.
Oron – Oron Nation; Capital: Oron	Widely recognized independent state.
Ottoman Empire – Sublime Ottoman State; Capital: Constantinople	Widely recognized independent state. The following are autonomous territories of the Ottoman Empire: Al-Muntafiq (Vassal state); Bulgaria (Vassal state); (Ottoman Empire) Cyprus (Eyalet); Egypt (De jure Autonomous vassal under de facto British occupation); Mecca (Non-sovereign state); Qatar (De facto autonomous Kazak); Samos (Autonomous state); Tripolitania (Eyalet)
=== P ===
Paraguay – Republic of Paraguay; Capital: Asunción	Widely recognized independent state.
Pattani – Sultanate of Patani; Capital: Patani	Widely recognized state.
→ Persia – Sublime State of Persia; Capital: Tehran	Widely recognized independent state.
Peru; Capital: Lima: National Reconstruction (to 8 September 1895); Aristocratic Republic (from 8 September 1895)	Widely recognized independent state.
Portugal – Kingdom of Portugal; Capital: Lisbon	Widely recognized independent state. The following are colonies, vassal state and possession of Portugal: Portuguese Cape Verde (Colony); Kongo (Vassal state); Portuguese East Africa (Colony); Portuguese Guinea (Colony); Portuguese India (Colony); Portuguese Macau (Colony); Portuguese São Tomé and Príncipe (Colony); Portuguese Timor (Colony); Portuguese West Africa (Colony); Fort of São João Baptista de Ajudá (Possession)
Potiskum – Potiskum Emirate; Capital: Potiskum	Widely recognized independent state.
=== R ===
Romania – Kingdom of Romania; Capital: Bucharest	Widely recognized independent state.
Rujumbura – Rujumbura Kingdom; Capital: Not specified	Widely recognized independent state.
Rukiga – Rukiga Kingdom; Capital: Not specified	Widely recognized independent state.
→ Russia – Russian Empire; Capital: Saint Petersburg	Widely recognized independent state. Russia had two protectorates, and one autonomous grand duchy: Bukhara (Protectorate); Khiva (Protectorate); Finland (Autonomous grand duchy)
=== S ===
Samoa – Kingdom of Samoa; Capital: Apia	Widely recognized independent state.
San Marino – Most Serene Republic of San Marino; Capital: San Marino	Widely recognized independent state.
Serbia – Kingdom of Serbia; Capital: Belgrade	Widely recognized independent state.
Setul Mambang Segara – Kingdom of Setul Mambang Segara; Capital: Kota Mambang Segara	Widely recognized independent state.
(Thailand) Siam – Kingdom of Siam; Capital: Bangkok	Widely recognized independent state. The following are vassal states of Siam: Luang Phrabang (Vassal state, to 1893)
Sokoto – Sokoto Caliphate; Capital: Sokoto	Widely recognized independent state.
Spain – Kingdom of Spain; Capital: Madrid	Widely recognized independent state. Spain had three colonies, and two possessions: (Spain) Elobey, Annobón and Corisco (Colony); (Spain) Fernando Po (Colony); (Spain) Río Muni (Colony); (Spain) Spanish North Africa (Possession); Spanish Sahara (Possession)
Sweden and Norway – United Kingdoms of Sweden and Norway; Capital: Stockholm, Christiania	Personal union of the separate kingdoms of Sweden and Norway.
Switzerland – Swiss Confederation; Capital: Bern	Widely recognized independent state.
=== T ===
Tagant – Emirate of Tagant; Capital: Tidjikja	Widely recognized independent state.
Tonga – Kingdom of Tonga; Capital: Nuku'alofa	Widely recognized independent state.
Tooro – Tooro Kingdom (to 14 August 1891); Capital: Kabarole	Widely recognized independent state until 14 August 1891. Annexed by the United Kingdom and incorporated into the Uganda Protectorate on 14 August 1891.
Toucouleur – Toucouleur Empire (to 1890); Capital: Segou	Widely recognized independent state until 1890. Annexed by France and incorporated into French Sudan in 1890.
Transvaal – South African Republic; Capital: Pretoria	Widely recognized independent state.
Trarza – Emirate of Trarza; Capital: Mederdra	Widely recognized independent state.
Tui Manuʻa – Tui Manuʻa Confederacy; Capital: Fitiuta	Widely recognized independent state.
=== U ===
United Kingdom – United Kingdom of Great Britain and Ireland; Capital: London	Widely recognized independent state. The following are colonies, territories, dependencies and protectorates of the United Kingdom: (United Kingdom) Aden (Protectorate); Afghanistan (Protectorate under Treaty of Gandamak); (United Kingdom) Amoy (Concession); Anglo-Egyptian Sudan (Condominium of the United Kingdom and the Khedivate of Egypt from 19 June 1899); (United Kingdom) Ascension Island (Possession); Bahama Islands (Crown colony); Bahrain (Protectorate); (United Kingdom) Baker Island (Uninhabited possession); Barbados (Crown colony); (United Kingdom) Basutoland (Crown colony); Barotseland (Protectorate to November 28, 1899); (United Kingdom) Bechuanaland (Protectorate); (United Kingdom) Barotziland–North-Western Rhodesia (Protectorate from November 28, 1899); Bermuda (Crown colony); (United Kingdom) Bights of Benin and Biafra (Protectorate until 1891); (United Kingdom) British Bechuanaland (Crown colony to November 16, 1895); British Central Africa (Protectorate from 1893); British Ceylon (Crown colony); British Cyprus (Protectorate); British East Africa (Protectorate from July 1, 1895); British Guiana (Colony); British Honduras (Crown colony); British Hong Kong (Crown colony); British Jamaica (Crown colony); British Leeward Islands (Federal colony); British Mauritius (Crown colony); (United Kingdom) British Somaliland (Crown colony); British Trinidad and Tobago (Crown colony); British Windward Islands (Crown colony); → Brunei (Protectorate); Canada (Dominion); Cape Colony (Colony); (United Kingdom) Chinde (Concession from 1891); Colony of Natal (Colony); Cook Islands (Protectorate to March 15, 1893 and Crown colony from March 15, 1893); Falkland Islands (Crown colony); Federated Malay States (Protectorate from 1895); (United Kingdom) Friendly Islands (Tripartite protectorate); Gambia (Crown colony and protectorate); Gibraltar (Crown colony); (United Kingdom) Gilbert and Ellice Islands (Protectorate from 1892); Gold Coast (Crown colony); (United Kingdom) Graham Land (Uninhabited possession); Guernsey (Crown dependency); (United Kingdom) Hankou (Concession); (United Kingdom) Heard Island and McDonald Islands (Uninhabited possession); (United Kingdom) Heligoland (Protectorate to 1890); India - Indian Empire (Crown colony); (United Kingdom) Isle of Man (Crown dependency); (United Kingdom) Jarvis Island (Uninhabited possession); Jersey (Crown dependency); (United Kingdom) Jiujiang (Concession); Kuwait (Protectorate from January 17, 1899); (United Kingdom) Labuan (Protectorate to 1890); Lagos (Colony); Maldive Islands (Protectorate); Malta (Crown colony); Manipur (Protectorate to 1891); Mosquito Coast (Under British influence until 1894); Muscat and Oman (Protectorate); Nepal (Protectorate); Newfoundland (Crown colony); New South Wales (Colony); (United Kingdom) New Zealand (Colony); Niger Coast (Protectorate from 12 May 1893 to 31 December 1899); (United Kingdom) Niger Districts (Protectorate); North Borneo (Protectorate); (United Kingdom) Oil Rivers (Protectorate until 12 May 1893); British New Guinea (Colony); Rarotonga (Protectorate to 1893); (United Kingdom) Redonda (Possession); Rhodesia (Company Rule by British South Africa Company); Queensland (Colony); Saint Helena (Crown colony); Sarawak (Protectorate); Sierra Leone (Crown colony and protectorate from August 31, 1896); Sikkim (Protectorate from 1890); South Australia (Colony); Straits Settlements (Crown colony); (United Kingdom) Suez Canal Zone (Crown colony); Tasmania (Colony); (United Kingdom) Tientsin (Concession); (United Kingdom) Tokelau (Protectorate); (United Kingdom) Tristan da Cunha (Crown colony); Trucial States (Protectorate); Unfederated Malay States; Kedah (Protectorate); Kelantan (Protectorate); Perlis (Protectorate); Terengganu (Protectorate); (United Kingdom) Uganda (Protectorate from June 19, 1894); (United Kingdom) Union Islands (Protectorate); Victoria (Colony); (United Kingdom) Victoria Land (Uninhabited possession); Weihai (Concession from July 1, 1898); Western Australia (Colony); Wituland (Protectorate from 1890 to 1895); Zanzibar (Protectorate from 1890); (United Kingdom) Zhenjiang (Concession); (United Kingdom) Zululand (Crown colony until 1897)
→ → United States – United States of America; Capital: Washington D.C.	Widely recognized independent state. The following are territories of the United States of America: → → Alaska (District); (United States) American Samoa (Territory from December 2, 1899); → → Arizona (Territory); → → Bajo Nuevo Bank (Uninhabited territory); Cuba (Territory from April 20, 1898); Guam (Territory from December 2, 1898); Hawaii (Territory from August 12, 1898); Howland Island (Uninhabited territory); Idaho (Territory to July 3, 1890); → → Indian Territory (Territory); → → Johnston Atoll (Uninhabited territory); → → Kingman Reef (Uninhabited territory); → → Middlebrook Island (Uninhabited territory); → → Midway Atoll (Uninhabited territory); → → Navassa Island (Uninhabited territory); → → New Mexico (Territory); → → Oklahoma (Territory from May 2, 1890); Philippine Islands (Territory from August 14, 1898); Puerto Rico (Territory from April 11, 1899); → → Quita Sueño Bank (Uninhabited territory); → → Roncador Bank (Uninhabited territory); → → Serrana Bank (Uninhabited territory); → → Serranilla Bank (Uninhabited territory); → → Swan Islands (Uninhabited territory); (United States) → → Tientsin (Concession); → Utah (Territory to January 4, 1896); Wake Island (Uninhabited territory from January 17, 1899); Wyoming (Territory to July 10, 1890)
Upper Aulaqi Sheikhdom; Capital: Sa'id	Widely recognized independent state
Upper Yafa – State of Upper Yafa; Capital: Mahjaba	Widely recognized independent state.
Uruguay – Eastern Republic of Uruguay; Capital: Montevideo	Widely recognized independent state.
=== V ===
Venezuela – United States of Venezuela; Capital: Caracas	Widely recognized independent state.
=== W ===
Wadai – Wadai Empire; Capital: Abéché	Widely recognized independent state.
Wahidi Bir Ali – Wahidi Sultanate of Bir Ali (until January 1896); Capital: Bi'r `Ali	Widely recognized independent state until January 1896. Annexed by the United Kingdom and incorporated into the Aden Protectorate in January 1896.
Wajoq – Kingdom of Wajoq; Capital: Tosora	Widely recognized independent state
Warsangali – Warsangali Sultanate; Capital: Las Khorey	Widely recognized independent state.
Wassoulou – Wassoulou Empire (to 29 September 1898); Capital: Bissandugu	Widely recognized independent state until 29 September 1898. Annexed by Frace and incorporated into French West Africa|France on 29 September 1898.
Wolaita – Kingdom of Wolaita (to November 1894); Capital: Lasho, Dalbo, Sodo	Widely recognized independent state until November 1894. Annexed by the Ethiopian Empire in November 1894.
Wukari – Wukari Federation; Capital: Wukari	Widely recognized independent state.
=== Y ===
Yamma – Kingdom of Yamma (to 1894); Capital: Fofa	Widely recognized independent state until 1894. Annexed by the Ethiopian Empire in 1894.
Yeke – Yeke Kingdom (to 20 December 1891); Capital: Bunkeya	Widely recognized independent state until 20 December 1891. Annexed by the Congo Free State on 20 December 1891
=== Z ===
Zabarma – Zabarma Emirate (to 1897); Capital: Not specified	Widely recognized independent state until 1897. Zabarma was partitioned and incorporated into two different colonies in 1897: French Upper Volta of France, and British Gold Coast of the United Kingdom.
→ Zanzibar – Sultanate of Zanzibar (to 1 July 1890); Capital: Stone Town	Widely recognized independent state until 1 July 1890. Annexed by the United Kingdom on 1 July 1890.
== States with limited independence, sovereignty or recognition == Excluded from the list above are the following noteworthy entities which either were not fully sovereign or did not claim to be independent:
Aceh – Sultanate of Aceh; Capital: Kutaraja	Protectorate of the Ottoman Empire.
Acre – Republic of Acre (from July 14, 1899); Capital: Cidade do Acre	Unrecognized successionist state in Argentina. De facto independent state from July 14, 1899.
Biak-na-Bato – Republic of Biak-na-Bato (from November 1 to December 15, 1897); Capital: San Miguel	Unrecognized state.
Bulgaria – Principality of Bulgaria; Capital: Sofia	De facto independent, and de jure vassal state under the suzerainty of the Ottoman Empire.
Canada – Dominion of Canada; Capital: Ottawa	Autonomous Dominion of the United Kingdom. Canada was largely represented by the UK internationally and had little recognition as an independent state. Canada was a federation made up of seven provinces and three territories. (Note: 7 provinces: British Columbia, New Brunswick, Nova Scotia, Manitoba, Ontario, Prince Edward Island and Quebec. 3 territories: Keewatin, North-west Territories and the Yukon Territory (from June 13, 1898).)
Champasak – Kingdom of Champasak (from 1899); Capital: Champasak	Vassal state of Siam.
Counani – Republic of Independent Guiana (to 1891); Capital: Counani	Unrecognized state.
Crete – Cretan State (from December 9, 1898); Capital: Chania	De facto independent state. Autonomous state of the Ottoman Empire.
Cruzob – Chan Santa Cruz; Capital: Noh Kah Balam Nah Chan Santa Cruz	De facto independent state. Claimed by Mexico
Cuba – Republic of Cuba (from 24 February 1895 to 10 December 1898); Capital: Havana	Unrecognized state.
Dar al Kuti – Sultanate of Dar Al Kuti; Capital: N'Délé	Vassal state of Dar Runga to 1890. Vassal state of Rabih az-Zubayr from 1890.
Dervish State – Dervish State (from 1895); Capital: Taleh	Unrecognized state.
Formosa – Republic of Formosa (from May 24 to October 23, 1895); Capital: Taipei	Unrecognized state.
Franceville – Independent Commune of Franceville (to 1890); Capital: None	Unrecognized state.
Jungle Nation – Jungle Republic (from 22 May 1899); Capital: Moyobamba	Unrecognized state from 22 May 1899. Claimed by Peru.
Kano – Emirate of Kano; Capital: Takai	Vassal of the Sokoto Caliphate.
Khiva – Khanate of Khiva; Capital: Khiva	Semi-independent state. Under Russian protection.
Kongo – Kingdom of Kongo; Capital: Mbanza-Kongo	Vassal of the Kingdom of Portugal.
Lado – Lado District (from 1894); Capital: Lado	Unrecognized state. Claimed by the Congo Free State.
Loreto – Federal State of Loreto (from 2 May to 10 July 1896); Capital: Iquitos	Unrecognised self-proclaimed federated state within Peru.
Maguindanao – Sultanate of Maguindanao (to 30 October 1898); Capital: Kuta Watu	De facto independent state until 30 October 1898.
Mahdist Sudan – Mahdist State (to September 2, 1898); Capital: Omdurman	Unrecognized state. Annexed by Sudan on September 2, 1898.
Mato Grosso – Transatlantic Republic of Mato Grosso (to 1892); Capital: Corumba	Unrecognized state until 1892. Annexed by Brazil in 1892.
Muscat and Oman – Sultanate of Muscat and Oman (to 1891); Capital: Muscat	De jure independent state. De facto a British protectorate from 1891.
Negros – Republic of Negros (from 27 November 1898); Capital: Bacólod	Unrecognized state from 27 November 1898. Constituent of the Federal State of the Visayas from 1898 to 1899.
Philippines – First Philippine Republic (from 23 January 1899); Capital: Several temporary capitals	De facto independent state from 23 January 1899.
Sulu – Sultanate of Sulu; Capital: Maimbung	De facto independent state. Protectorate of Spain until 1899. Became a protectorate of the United States from 1899.
Swaziland – Kingdom of Swaziland (from 1894); Capital: Mbabane	Unrecognized state from 1894.
Tagalog Republic – Sovereign Tagalog Nation (from August 29, 1896, to March 22, 1897); Capital: Morong	Unrecognized state.
Trinidad – Principality of Trinidad (from 1893 to 1895); Capital: None	Unrecognized state from 1893 to 1895. Annexed by Brazil in 1895.
Zamboanga – Republic of Zamboanga (from 18 May to 16 November 1898); Capital: Zamboanga City	Unrecognized state from 18 May to 16 November 1898.
