= List of African Great Lakes kingdoms =

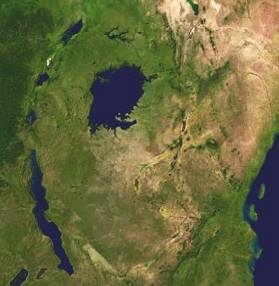
Satellite image of African Great Lakes region

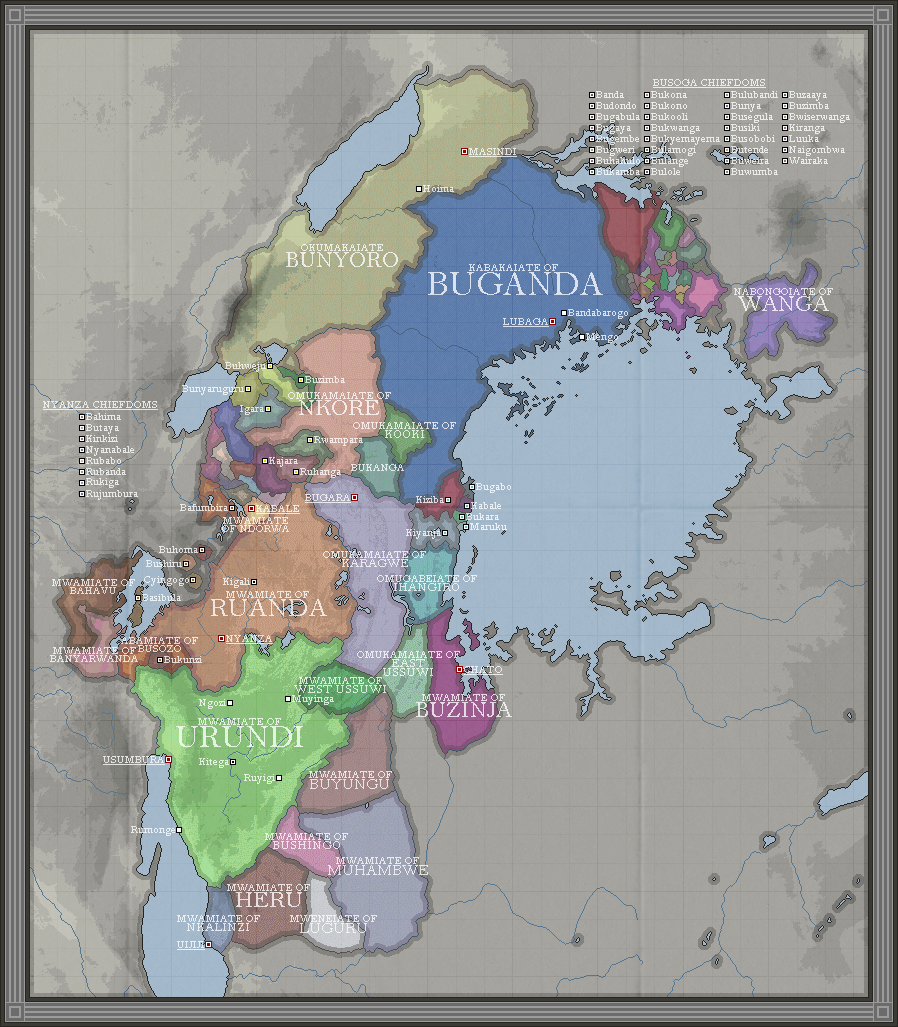
African Great Lakes Kingdoms, c.1880

The African Great Lakes kingdoms refers to the numerous historic kingdoms in the African Great Lakes region. These polities existed sometime between the eleventh and nineteenth centuries as independent kingdoms, and had similar and yet sometimes distinct cultures, values and traditions. The Great Lakes kingdoms were found in Southeast Africa and some parts of Central Africa, in what is present-day northwest Tanzania, south Uganda, some parts of Rwanda, Burundi and Eastern Congo.

- Kingdom of Bushi
- Empire of Kitara
- Bunyoro
- Buganda
- Tekedi
- Padibe
- Patongo
- Alur/Alero
- Koc
- Wipac
- Kitagwenda
- Kayonza
- Kingizi
- Bugisu
- Bukedi
- Burundi
- Busoga
- Busongora
- Busigi
- Uvinza
- Usangi
- Gizaka
- Igara
- Nshenyi
- Rujumbura
- Kajara
- Obwera
- Rukiga/Bushengyera
- Bugesera
- Karagwe
- Kimwani
- Bashi
- Bukunzi
- Kinkoko/Cyinkoko
- Buhoma
- Bahavu
- Bukerebe/Ukerebe
- Kooki
- Buzimba
- Buhweju
- Bunyaruguru
- Ibanda
- Kyania
- Lango
- Mpororo/Ndorwa
- Mubari
- Nkore
- Rusubi/Ussuwi
- Rwanda
- Rwenzururu
- Sebei
- Teso
- Tooro
- Palwo kingdoms (subset of Luo):
  - Pawir Kingdom
  - Lira Paluo
  - Paimol
- Buha kingdoms:
  - Heru/Oha
  - Nkalinzi/Manyovu
  - Bushingo/Ushingo
  - Muhambwe
  - Buyungu
  - Luguru/Ruguru
  - Ujiji/Bujiji
  - Bushubi
- Buhaya:
  - Kyamutwara
    - later Lesser Kyamtwara
  - Kiziba
  - Ihangiro
  - Kianja/Kihanja
  - Maruku
  - Bugabo

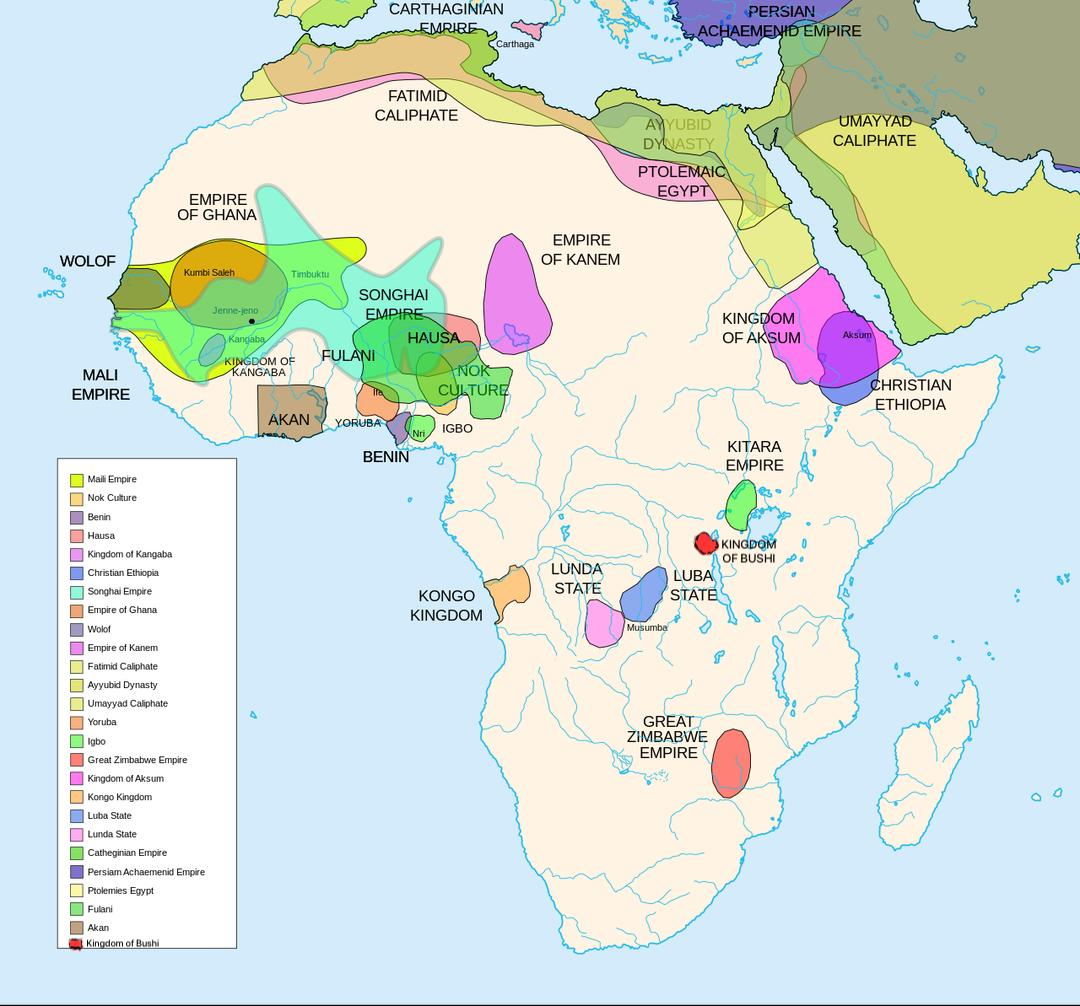
Ancient kingdoms in Africa

== History ==
Bantu peoples introduced the institution of kingship and the concept of centralized authority into the Great Lakes region. Kingly or chiefly leadership was a normal feature in many Bantu societies but was absent in the Central Sudanic, Sog Eastern Sahelian and Southern Cushitic societies that also resided in the region as their neighbors.

The exceptional role of the Niger-Congo Bantu-speakers manifested itself by their social capacity. Thus Bantu speech became the medium in which societies were organised. Bantu-speakers’ feature of inherited leadership on all levels of reality played a crucial part in the development of the centralised rule in the region."

— Birgitta Farelius, Origins of Kingship Traditions and Symbolism in the Great Lakes Region of Africa,

Although this entry only deals with the period up to the end of the eighteenth century, it is essential to recognize that the earlier histories of these polities and the detail with which they have been recorded are a direct product of nineteenth- and twentieth-century history and the circumstances which befell them. Nkore (Ankole in colonial times) found itself within the British Protectorate of Uganda and became a cornerstone of Protectorate policy, being one of the four main kingdoms and enjoying a considerably enlarged territorial status under the Protectorate than it had done in precolonial times. It was also served well by various missionaries, ethnographers, anthropologists, and historians. Buhaya was moderately well served, partly through expedient politics in the early colonial era and the siting of the regional colonial administrative center in Bukoba. By contrast, Karagwe fell from being one of the most powerful of the nineteenth century states in the Great Lakes, a position it had largely attained through its domination of early Indian Ocean-Great Lakes trade routes, to total collapse and obscurity by 1916. Writers on Karagwe have been sporadic and have failed to provide the rich array of texts that are available for Nkore, its northern neighbor. In independent Tanzania, under Nyerere, there was little place for such overtly unequal, precolonial political formations.

In much of the interlacustrine region, abundant rainfall and fertile soil supported a dense population, who produced a surplus which sustained courts and kings, and early European visitors wrote accounts of a land of plenty which attracted potential colonisers. It is easy to concentrate on the giants of the region—Buganda, Bunyoro, Rwanda, Burundi — to the neglect of their smaller neighbours, but there were over 200 polities in the region, some of them very small, as in Buha and Buzinza. There were 68 states in Busoga alone. Many of the states of the interlacustrine region — but not Buganda — were linked by various versions of the Cwezi saga.

— Elizabeth Isichei, A History of African Societies to 1870,

The actual origins of the dynasties that came to dominate are also unclear, being dependent on the interpretation of oral traditions. At face value, in all areas, dynasties claimed origin back to the Chwezi persona, Wamara. Subsequently, power fell into the hands of Ruhinda, and descent was directly drawn to him by many of the royal clans, known as Abahinda. Reinterpretations of these oral traditions suggest that characters such as Wamara and Ruhinda may well have been charismatic chiefs, who, after their deaths, became important spirits controlled by mediums tied to political power. Shrines to Wamara and Ruhinda were specifically associated with the manipulation and control of fertility.

A further integral component of these polities was clans. Each polity was an amalgamation of clans, and each clan contributed important components to the polity. Clans involved in the polity at an earlier stage tended to be regarded with a higher status. Clans were also associated with specialized activity, such as cattle-herding, iron-smelting, and regulating rituals. The royal clan sat atop this confederation and carefully maintained the status quo, by allocating particular offices to specific clans and by accepting wives for the king from the different clans. Thus, the mother of the king and her clan were very powerful in each individual reign, and this power helps to explain the regularity of succession disputes revealed by oral traditions.

These fairly simplistic reconstructions, of course, mask the major tensions and conflicts that existed within these states. An insight into such political intrigue has been provided by the historical work focusing on the Kaijja shrine, within the Maruku kingdom, twenty kilometers south of Bukoba. The site is the gashani, or jaw-bone shrine, of the seventeenth- and eighteenth-century king, Rugomora Mahe, who is said to have occupied the site and to have overseen iron-working there. The site is also an important shrine to the Chwezi spirit, Wamara. All the Buhaya states record a change from Hinda to Bito rulers around the seventeenth century, referring to the extension of Bito dynastic influence from Bunyoro. Significantly, Rugomora Mahe was an early Bito ruler, and his association with the shrine is interpreted as an integral part of the ritual conflict between Hinda followers and their spirits, and the new Bito rulers. At broadly similar times oral traditions in Karagwe and Nkore record incursions and even lengthy occupations by forces from Bunyoro, but emphasize ultimate victory over the invaders.

In Nkore, it has been possible to identify sites associated with political authority, extending several centuries back into the past. The locations of these sites indicate that the early core Nkore area was in a restricted highland area, Isingiro, twenty kilometers south of the modern center of Mbarara. The suggestion is therefore that these were initially very localized political formations, some of which gradually expanded. Military power was initially realized in terms of numbers. The Buhaya states were all small and do not appear to have had a significant military capability. Karagwe does appear to have had military strength, and this may have been due to its greater population size. Nkore, from its small base, does not appear to have had expansionist pretensions, or more importantly, capability, until key changes in its military organization. The creation of permanent levies of troops, known as Emitwe, allowed both the conquest of territory such as Mpororo and Buhweju and also the protection of its increasing herds from powerful neighbors to the north.

It is important to emphasize that, in their early stages, all these polities were small and vulnerable. In particular, they appear to have been susceptible to succession disputes, which seem to have been the main cause of conflict. More detailed histories of significant changes in structure and organization only really begin to emerge toward the end of the eighteenth century, when some polities started looking beyond their frontiers for new territories and resources to control.

=== Rise of Pastoral Kingdoms ===
Between 1000-1450AD, climate change caused parts of the Great Lakes to become drier. Forests slowly gave way to more pastoral land, which increased the ability of people who owned cattle to claim land and enrich themselves. This led to increased political power for herders and an entrenchment of forms of spirituality that emphasized the relationship between kingship, chiefship, and cattle. Particularly in the drier regions of Ankole and Karagwe, there was also an increasing importance in the distinction between cattle-herding Bahima and farmers. In later years, these economic pastimes became almost mutually exclusive and were the foundations of class formation. It is significant, however, that although kings generally leaned toward pastoralism as an ideal lifestyle, even in the later centuries the king stood above the cattle-agriculture dichotomy, practicing rituals which were integral to both economic forms. Most notably, every month kings conducted the New Moon rituals which ensured the fertility of the land and the fecundity of cattle. Furthermore, at least some kings were also regarded as iron smiths (but not smelters). The best-known example of this was the incorporation of iron-working hammers into the royal regalia of Karagwe, generally associated with Omukama Ndagara in the early nineteenth century.

The global crisis of ecological and socio-political nature increased the tensions and competition between the interests of farmers and cattle-keepers which in turn stimulated searches for new lands and new relationships. Change came from internal ruptures and the creation of kingdoms appeared to be the best form of restructuring relationships between clans and territories. More and more farming communities suffered from drought and were forced to emphasize pastoralism. Pastoralist values grew in importance and the control of long-distance trade by specialized sections within a limited group of clans met the growing demand for salt by herders.

== Metallurgy ==
Since 600 BCE, Bantu peoples in Uganda had been producing high-grade carbon steels using preheated forced draft furnaces, a technique achieved in Europe only with the Siemons process in the mid-19th century.

Anthropologist Peter Schmidt discovered through the communication of oral tradition that the Haya in Tanzania have been forging steel for over 2000 years. This discovery was made accidentally while Schmidt was learning about the history of the Haya via their oral tradition. He was led to a tree which was said to rest on the spot of an ancestral furnace used to forge steel. When later tasked with the challenge of recreating the forges, a group of elders who at this time were the only ones to remember the practice, due to the disuse of the practice due in part to the abundance of steel flowing into the country from foreign sources. Despite their lack of practice, the elders were able to create a furnace using mud and grass, which, when burnt, provided the carbon needed to transform the iron into steel. Later investigation of the area yielded 13 other furnaces similar in design to the recreation set up by the elders. These furnaces were carbon dated and were found to be as old as 2000 years, whereas steel of this caliber did not appear in Europe until several centuries later.

The Bachwezi were said to have been skilled blacksmiths (blacksmith kings are a common trope in the ethnogenesis of many Bantu societies).

In the Kingdom of Rwanda, blacksmiths were Hutu, but on special occasions, the king (a Tutsi) is symbolically assimilated to a blacksmith (although not a smith in his day-to-day life). Several hammers were part of the king's regalia and were used by the king during ceremonies. One hammer (named Nyarushara) was kept near the bed of the mwami, and another metallic implement associated with Rwandan kingship is called Nyamvura (the one who has rains). The Mwami was considered the "supreme blacksmith" of the state. Mwami Cyirima Rujugira was buried with two anvils beside his head. Within the Kingdom of Burundi, a blacksmith was always a Hutu, but never a Tutsi. Tradition states that the first king of Burundi, Ntare Rushatsi (who is said to be of Hutu origin) introduced iron and copper working to the land.

== Agriculture ==
Within the African Great Lakes advanced agriculture practices were employed such as "hydraulic practices in the mountains, man-made watering places, river diversions, hollowed-out tree-trunk pipes, irrigation on cultivated slopes, mounding in drained marshes, and irrigation of banana and palm tree gardens" as well as extensive use of terraces and the practice of double and triple cropping. The agrarian success of the Great Lakes civilization accounts for its exceptionally high levels of human density. Many foreign experts were impressed by the sophistication of the area's traditional methods of intensive farming.

The "beautiful irrigated fields", the steep terraced slopes of the thousand hills, where every patch of ground is put to use, the "well-fed cattle with colossal horns" were "wonderful discoveries" to the Europeans. But even greater surprises awaited them.

— Christian P. Scherrer, Genocide and Crisis in Central Africa: Conflict Roots, Mass Violence, and Regional War

The earliest Europeans to visit the Kingdom of Rwanda observed intense pride in cultivating skills. A mother would give a crying baby a toy hoe to play with and a range of techniques often superior to those of Eastern European peasants, notably the use of manure, terracing, and artificial irrigation.

Pastoralists were not always given positive or biased views by colonials. Emin Pasha for instance found the Bahima to be more backward than the agriculturists of the area, noting that their compounds were dirty and unkempt:

The essentially negative imagery of this depiction — ‘dirty and neglected compounds’ and lack of cultivation — suggests that Emin himself regarded the pastoralists as inferior to their agricultural compatriots, who were, after all, often praised by foreign observers for their tidiness and cleanliness. This stands in contrast to the standard view, that the pastoralists were a little higher in the league of civilization than the cultivators.

Not surprisingly, the earliest farming settlements appeared in the wet coastal littoral of Buhaya, on the western shores of Lake Victoria. Archaeological research has indicated extensive activity, most notably in terms of iron smelting, from the last few centuries BCE. These societies exploited the extensive rainforests that were available at the time and, after initial cultivation of yams and other forest crops, presumably became proficient in the exploitation of bananas. Linguistic and archaeological evidence in Karagwe and Nkore on the other hand, indicates occupation around the beginning of the second millennium, based upon the increasing exploitation of cattle, supported by grain crops. From these bases, the core elements of the polities undoubtedly developed, although there is little evidence, as yet, to document the process.

Contrary to the debunked Hamitic hypothesis, various states were established by agriculturalists before any pastoralists became politically important. Between the years 1200-1500, the activities of pastoralists were peripheral and had no influence. For example, the kingdom of Buganda and the various Busoga kingdoms emerged as forest states whose economies depended mainly on agriculture rather than on a combination of pastoralism and agriculture with the resulting caste systems and class structures.

=== Pastoralism ===
Certain areas of the Great Lakes region have been described as a paradise for pastoralists.

The grasslands from which this explosion of pastoral pursuits erupted are among the lushest in Africa. Better watered than the savannas which often are regarded as the ‘proper’ home of pastoralism, yet fortuitously avoiding the scourge of the tsetse fly, the high productivity of the Great Lakes grasslands enabled people to maximize the potential of cattle, rather than simply employ them as a means of utilizing environments that were otherwise uninhabitable. Here more than anywhere else in Africa it has been possible to maintain highly specialized herding in coordination with cultivating communities and to select medium-sized cattle of a not especially drought-resistant breed.
