= List of sovereign states in the 1900s =

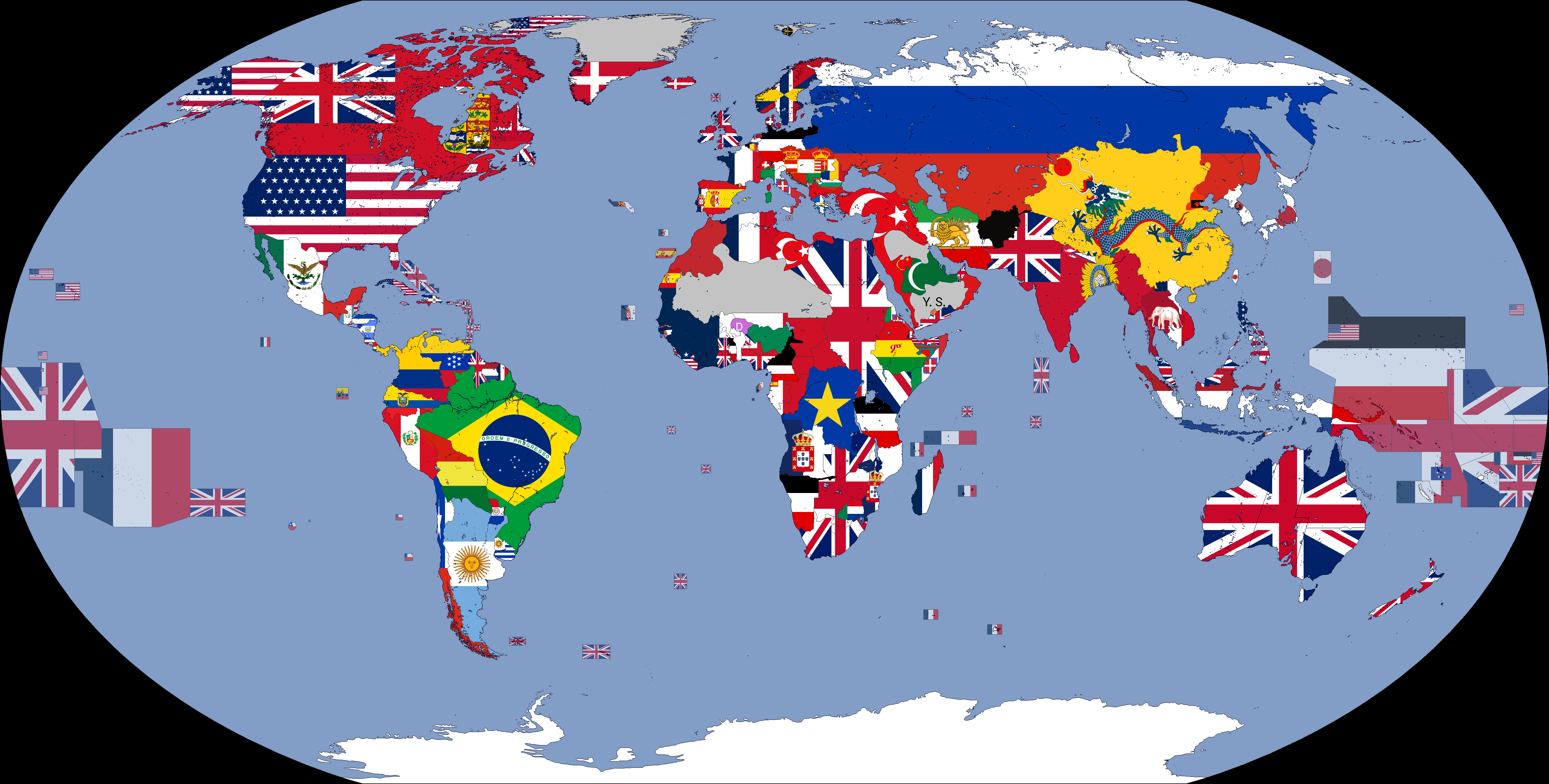
Map of the World in 1900

This is a list of sovereign states in the 1900s, giving an overview of states around the world during the period between 1 January 1900 and 31 December 1909. It contains entries, arranged alphabetically, with information on the status and recognition of their sovereignty. It includes 119 widely recognized sovereign states, and entities which were de facto sovereign but which were not widely recognized by other states.

== Sovereign states ==
Name and capital city	Information on status and recognition of sovereignty
=== A ===
Aboh – Kingdom of Aboh (to 1900); Capital: Aboh	Widely recognized independent state until 1900. Annexed by the United Kingdom and incorporated into the Southern Nigeria Protectorate in 1900.
Abuja – Abuja Emirate (to 1902); Capital: Abuja	Widely recognized independent state until 1902. Annexed by the United Kingdom and incorporated into the Protectorate of Northern Nigeria in 1902.
Agadez – Tenere Sultanate of Aïr (to 1906); Capital: Agadez	Widely recognized independent state until 1906. Annexed by France and incorporated into French West Africa in 1906.
Andorra – Principality of Andorra; Capital: Andorra la Vella	Widely recognized independent state. the President of France and Bishop of Urgell are ex officio Co-Princes of Andorra.
Angoche – Angoche Sultanate; Capital: Angoche	Widely recognized independent state.
Ankole – Kingdom of Ankole (to 25 October 1901); Capital: Mbarara	Widely recognized independent state. Annexed by the United Kingdom and incorporated into the Protectorate of Uganda on 25 October 1901.
Argentina – Argentine Republic; Capital: Buenos Aires	Widely recognized independent state. Argentina is a federation of 23 provinces and an autonomous city.
Aro – Aro Confederacy (to January 1902); Capital: Arochukwu	Widely recognized independent state. Annexed by the United Kingdom in January 1902.
Ashanti – Ashanti Empire (to 1 January 1902); Capital: Kumasi	Widely recognized independent state. Annexed by the United Kingdom and incorporated into the Gold Coast on 1 January 1902.
Aussa – Sultanate of Aussa; Capital: Aussa	Widely recognized independent state.
Austria-Hungary – Austro-Hungarian Monarchy; Capital: Vienna (Cisleithania), Budapest (Transleithania)	Widely recognized independent state. Austria-Hungary is a constitutional dual monarchy formed by the Empire of Austria (Cisleithania) and the Kingdom of Hungary (Transleithania). The following are concessions, condominium, and Crown Lands of Austria-Hungary: Bohemia (Crown land of Cisleithania); Bosnia and Herzegovina (Condominium governed jointly by Cisleithania and Transleithania, from 7 October 1908); Bukovina (Crown land of Cisleithania); Carinthia (Crown land of Cisleithania); Carniola (Crown land of Cisleithania); Croatia-Slavonia (Crown land of Transleithania); Dalmatia (Crown land of Cisleithania); Fiume (Crown land of Transleithania); Galicia and Lodomeria (Crown land of Cisleithania); Gorizia and Gradisca (Crown land of Cisleithania); Hungary (Crown land of Transleithania); Istria (Crown land of Cisleithania); Kraków (Crown land of Cisleithania); Lower Austria (Crown land of Cisleithania); Moravia (Crown land of Cisleithania); Salzburg (Crown land of Cisleithania); Silesia (Crown land of Cisleithania); Styria (Crown land of Cisleithania); (Austria-Hungary) Tientsin (Concession, from 27 December 1902); Trieste (Crown land of Cisleithania); Tyrol (Crown land of Cisleithania); Upper Austria (Crown land of Cisleithania); Vorarlberg (Crown land of Cisleithania)
=== B ===
Bali – Kingdom of Bali (to 18 April 1908); Capital: Klungkung	Widely recognized independent state. Annexed by the Netherlands and incorporated into the Dutch East Indies on 18 April 1908.
Beihan – Emirate of Beihan (to January 1904); Capital: Suq Abdulla	Widely recognized independent state until January 1904. Joined the Aden Protectorate.
Belgium – Kingdom of Belgium; Capital: Brussels	Widely recognized independent state. Belgium has 1 colony and 1 concession: Belgian Congo (Colony, from 15 November 1908); (Belgium) Tientsin (Concession, from 1902)
Bhutan; Capital: Punakha: Bhutan (to 17 December 1907); Kingdom of Bhutan (from 17 December 1907)	Widely recognized independent state.
Biu – Biu Kingdom (to 1900); Capital: Biu	Widely recognized independent state until 1900. Annexed by the United Kingdom and incorporated into the Northern Nigeria Protectorate in 1900.
Bolivia – Republic of Bolivia; Capital: Sucre (official), La Paz (administrative)	Widely recognized independent state.
Brakna – Brakna Emirate (to 18 October 1904); Capital: Aleg	Widely recognized independent state until 18 October 1904. Annexed by France and incorporated into French Mauritania on 18 October 1904.
Brazil – Republic of the United States of Brazil; Capital: Rio de Janeiro	Widely recognized independent state. Brazil was a federation of 20 states, one territory, and one federal district. (Note: 20 States: Alagoas, Amazonas, Bahia, Ceará, Espírito Santo, Goiás, Maranhão, Mato Grosso, Minas Gerais, Pará, Paraíba, Paraná, Pernambuco, Piauí, Rio Grande do Norte, Rio Grande do Sul, Rio de Janeiro, Santa Catarina, São Paulo, Sergipe. 1 Territory: Acre (from 30 April 1904). 1 Federal District: Federal District.)
Bulgaria; Capital: Sofia: Principality of Bulgaria (de facto independent state, to 5 October 1908); Kingdom of Bulgaria (from 5 October 1908)	De facto independent state until 5 October 1908. Widely recognized independent state from 5 October 1908.
Busoga – Kingdom of Busoga (to 1906); Capital: Bugembe	Widely recognized independent state until 1906. the Kingdom of Busoga is a collection of 68 autonomous and semi-independent chiefdoms. Annexed by the United Kingdom in 1906.
Buton – Sultanate of Buton (to April 1906); Capital: Baubau	Widely recognized independent state until April 1906. Annexed by the Netherlands and incorporated into the Dutch East Indies in April 1906.
=== C ===
Chile – Republic of Chile; Capital: Santiago	Widely recognized independent state.
China – Great Qing Empire; Capital: Peking	Widely recognized independent state.
Chokwe – Chokwe Kingdom (to 1908); Capital: Kalundungu	Widely recognized independent state until 1908. Annexed by Portugal and incorporated into Portuguese West Africa in 1908.
Colombia – Republic of Colombia; Capital: Bogotá	Widely recognized independent state.
Congo – Congo Free State (to 15 November 1908); Capital: Boma	Widely recognized independent state until 15 November 1908. State in personal union with the Kingdom of Belgium until 15 November 1908. Annexed by Belgium on 15 November 1908.
→ Costa Rica – First Costa Rican Republic; Capital: San José	Widely recognized independent state.
Cuba – Republic of Cuba (from 20 May 1902 to 28 September 1906, and from 6 February 1909); Capital: Havana	Widely recognized independent state from 20 May 1902. Annexed by the United States of America from 28 September 1906 to 6 February 1909.
=== D ===
Damagaram – Sultanate of Damagaram (to 1902); Capital: Zinder	Widely recognized independent state until 1902. Annexed by France and incorporated into French West Africa in 1902.
Dar al Kuti – Sultanate of Dar Al Kuti; Capital: N'Délé	Widely recognized independent state.
Dar Masalit – Sultanate of Dar Masalit; Capital: El Geneina	Widely recognized independent state.
Darfur – Sultanate of Darfur; Capital: El Fasher	Widely recognized independent state.
Dathina – Dathina Sheikhdom (to January 1901); Capital: Mudiyah	Widely recognized independent state until January 1901. Joined the British Aden Protectorate in January 1901.
Dendi – Dendi Kingdom (to 1901); Capital: Lulami	Widely recognized independent state until 1901. Annexed by France and incorporated into the French West Africa in 1901.
Denmark – Kingdom of Denmark; Capital: Copenhagen	Widely recognized independent state. Denmark has 1 colony and 1 dependency and 1 territory: (Denmark) Danish West Indies (Colony); Faroe Islands (Territory); (Denmark) Greenland (Territory); Iceland (Dependency)
Dhala – Emirate of Dhala (to 1904); Capital: Dhala	Widely recognized independent state until 1904. Annexed by the United Kingdom and incorporated into the British Aden Protectorate in 1904.
Dominican Republic – Second Dominican Republic; Capital: Santo Domingo	Widely recognized independent state.
=== E ===
→ Ecuador – Republic of Ecuador; Capital: Quito	Widely recognized independent state.
El Salvador – Republic of El Salvador; Capital: San Salvador	Widely recognized independent state.
Ethiopia – Ethiopian Empire; Capital: Addis Ababa	Widely recognized independent state.
=== F ===
France – Third French Republic; Capital: Paris	Widely recognized independent state. The following are colonies, concessions and protectorates of France: French Algeria (de jure Department of Metropolitan France, de facto Colony); (France) French Chad (Colony from 5 September 1900, merged with Ubangi-Shari on 11 February 1906); French Comoros (Protectorate); French Congo (Colony); French Gabon (Protectorate until 1903 when it became a colony); French Guiana (Colony); French India (Colony); French Indochina (Federation of colonies); (France) French Ivory Coast (Colony to 1904); French Madagascar (Colony); French Oceania (Protectorate); French Somaliland (Colony); French Tunisia (Protectorate); French West Africa (Federation of colonies); Futa Jallon (Protectorate); Guadeloupe (Colony); Guangzhouwan (Leased territory to 5 January 1900); (France) Hankou (Concession); Martinique (Colony); Mauritania (Protectorate from 1903 to 1904); New Caledonia (Colony); Réunion (Colony); Saint Pierre and Miquelon (Colony); Shanghai (Concession); Tientsin (Concession); Ubangi-Shari (Colony from 29 December 1903)
=== G ===
Geledi – Sultanate of the Geledi (to 3 September 1908); Capital: Afgooye	Widely recognized independent state until 3 September 1908. Annexed by Italy and incorporated into Italian Somaliland on 3 September 1908.
Germany – Deutsches Reich; Capital: Berlin	Widely recognized independent state. The following are colonies, concessions and protectorates of Germany: German East Africa (Colony); (German Empire) German Kiautschou (Concession); German New Guinea (Protectorate); (German Empire) German Samoa (Protectorate from March 1, 1900); (German South West Africa) German South-West Africa (Colony); (German Empire) Hankou (Concession); Kamerun (Colony); (German Empire) Tientsin (Concession); (German Empire) Togoland (Protectorate)
Gowa – Sultanate of Gowa; Capital: Jongaya	Widely recognized independent state.
Greece – Kingdom of Greece; Capital: Athens	Widely recognized independent state.
Guatemala – Republic of Guatemala; Capital: Guatemala City	Widely recognized independent state.
=== H ===
Ha'il – Emirate of Ha'il; Capital: Ha'il	Widely recognized independent state.
Haiti – Republic of Haiti; Capital: Port-au-Prince	Widely recognized independent state.
Honduras – Republic of Honduras; Capital: Tegucigalpa	Widely recognized independent state.
=== I ===
Igala – Igala Kingdom (to 1901); Capital: Idah	Widely recognized independent state until 1901. Annexed by the United Kingdom and incorporated into the Northern Nigeria Protectorate in 1901.
Igara – Kingdom of Igara (to 1901); Capital: Not specified	Widely recognized independent state until 1901. Annexed by the United Kingdom and incorporated into Ankole in 1901.
Ilé-Ifẹ̀ – Ilé-Ifẹ̀ Kingdom (to 1900); Capital: Ilé-Ifẹ̀	Widely recognized independent state until 1900. Annexed by the United Kingdom and incorporated into the Southern Nigeria Protectorate in 1900.
Italy – Kingdom of Italy; Capital: Rome	Widely recognized independent state. Italy had two colonies and one concession: (Kingdom of Italy) Amoy (Concession from 1902); (Kingdom of Italy) Italian Eritrea (Colony); (Kingdom of Italy) Italian Somaliland (Colony); (Kingdom of Italy) Shanghai (Concession from 1902); (Kingdom of Italy) Tientsin (Concession, from 7 June 1902)
=== J ===
Japan – Empire of Japan; Capital: Tokyo City	Widely recognized independent state. Japan had sovereignty over the following protectorates, dependencies and concessions: (Empire of Japan) Chongqing (Concession); (Empire of Japan) Hangzhou (Concession); (Empire of Japan) Hankou (Concession); (Korean Empire) Korea (Protectorate from 17 November 1905); (Empire of Japan) Karafuto (Dependency, from 5 September 1905); (Empire of Japan) Kwantung (Concession from 5 September 1905); (Empire of Japan) Shashi (Concession); (Empire of Japan) Suzhou (Concession); (Empire of Japan) Taiwan (Dependency); (Empire of Japan) Tientsin (Concession)
=== K ===
Kajara – Kajara Kingdom (to 1901); Capital: Not specified	Widely recognized independent state until 1901. Annexed by the United Kingdom and incorporated into Ankole in 1901.
Kasanje – Jaga Kingdom; Capital: Not specified	Widely recognized independent state.
Kebbi – Kebbi Emirate (to 1902); Capital: Argungu	Widely recognized independent state until 1902. Annexed by the United Kingdom and incorporated into the Northern Nigeria Protectorate in 1902.
Korea – Greater Korean Empire (to 17 November 1905); Capital: Hanseong	Widely recognized independent state to 17 November 1905. Became a Japanese protectorate on 17 November 1905.
=== L ===
Lafia Beri-Beri – Lafia Beri-Beri Kingdom (to 1900); Capital: Lafia	Widely recognized independent state. Annexed by the United Kingdom in 1900.
Liberia – Republic of Liberia; Capital: Monrovia	Widely recognized independent state.
Liechtenstein – Principality of Liechtenstein; Capital: Vaduz	Widely recognized independent state.
Luxembourg – Grand Duchy of Luxembourg; Capital: Luxembourg City	Widely recognized independent state.
=== M ===
Mbunda – Mbunda Kingdom; Capital: Not specified	Widely recognized independent state.
Mexico – United Mexican States; Capital: Mexico City	Widely recognized independent state. Mexico had one territory: (Mexico) Isla de la Pasión (uninhabited territory from 1905)
Monaco – Principality of Monaco; Capital: Monaco	Widely recognized independent state.
→ Montenegro – Principality of Montenegro; Capital: Cetinje	Widely recognized independent state.
Morocco – Sultanate of Morocco; Capital: Fes	Widely recognized independent state.
Mutayr – Emirate of Mutayr (to 1908); Capital: Not specified	Widely recognized independent state until 1908. Annexed by the third Saudi state in 1908.
=== N ===
Najran – Principality of Najran; Capital: Najran	Widely recognized independent state.
Ndzuwani – Ndzuwani Sultanate; Capital: Domoni	Widely recognized independent state.
Netherlands – Kingdom of the Netherlands; Capital: Amsterdam	Widely recognized independent state. The Netherlands had sovereignty over three colonies: Curaçao and Dependencies; Dutch East Indies; Surinam
→ Nicaragua – Republic of Nicaragua; Capital: Managua	Widely recognized independent state.
Niue – Kingdom of Niue-Fekai (to 20 October 1900); Capital: Not specified	Widely recognized independent state until 20 October 1900. Annexed by the United Kingdom on April 21, 1900.
→ Norway – Kingdom of Norway (from 7 June 1905); Capital: Christiania	Widely recognized independent state from 7 June 1905. In personal union with Sweden until 7 June 1905. Norway had three uninhabited possessions: (Norway) Bouvet Island; (Norway) Peter I Island; (Norway) Sverdrup Islands
Nri – Kingdom of Nri; Capital: Igbo-Ukwu	Widely recognized independent state.
Nshenyi – Nshenyi Kingdom (to 1901); Capital: Not specified	Widely recognized independent state until 1901. Annexed by the United Kingdom and incorporated into Ankole in 1901.
=== O ===
Obwera – Obwera Kingdom (to 1901); Capital: Not specified	Widely recognized independent state until 1901. Annexed by the United Kingdom and incorporated into Ankole in 1901.
Onitsha – Onitsha Kingdom (to 1900); Capital: Onitsha	Widely recognized independent state until 1900. Annexed by the United Kingdom and incorporated into the Southern Nigeria Protectorate in 1900.
Orange Free State (to May 31, 1902); Capital: Bloemfontein	Widely recognized independent state. Became a colony of the United Kingdom on 31 May 1902.
Oron – Oron Nation (to 1909); Capital: Oron	Widely recognized independent state to 1909. Annexed by the United Kingdom and incorporated into the Southern Nigeria Protectorate in 1909.
Ottoman Empire – Sublime Ottoman State; Capital: Constantinople	Widely recognized independent state. The following are autonomous territories of the Ottoman Empire: Al-Muntafiq (Vassal state); Crete (De jure autonomous state under de facto union with Greece since 1908); (Ottoman Empire) Cyprus (Eyalet); Egypt (De jure Autonomous vassal under de facto British occupation); Mecca (Non-sovereign state); Qatar (De facto autonomous Kazak); Samos (Autonomous state); Tripolitania (Eyalet)
=== P ===
→ Panama – Republic of Panama (from 3 November 1903); Capital: Panama City	Widely recognized independent state from 3 November 1903.
Paraguay – Republic of Paraguay; Capital: Asunción	Widely recognized independent state.
Pattani – Sultanate of Patani (to 1902); Capital: Patani	Widely recognized independent state until 1902. Annexed by Siam in 1902.
→ Persia – Sublime State of Persia; Capital: Tehran	Widely recognized independent state.
Peru – Peruvian Republic; Capital: Lima	Widely recognized independent state.
Portugal – Kingdom of Portugal; Capital: Lisbon	Widely recognized independent state. The following are colonies, vassal state and possession of Portugal: Portuguese Cape Verde (Colony); Kongo (Vassal state); Portuguese East Africa (Colony); Portuguese Guinea (Colony); Portuguese India (Colony); Portuguese Macau (Colony); Portuguese São Tomé and Príncipe (Colony); Portuguese Timor (Colony); Portuguese West Africa (Colony); Fort of São João Baptista de Ajudá (Possession)
Potiskum – Potiskum Emirate (to 1901); Capital: Potiskum	Widely recognized independent state until 1901. Annexed by the United Kingdom and incorporated into the Northern Nigeria Protectorate in 1901.
=== R ===
Riyadh – Emirate of Riyadh (from January 15, 1902); Capital: Riyadh	Widely recognized independent state from 15 January 1902.
Romania – Kingdom of Romania; Capital: Bucharest	Widely recognized independent state.
Rujumbura – Rujumbura Kingdom (to 1901); Capital: Not specified	Widely recognized independent state until 1901. Annexed by the United Kingdom and incorporated into the Protectorate of Uganda in 1901.
Rukiga – Rukiga Kingdom (to 1901); Capital: Not specified	Widely recognized independent state until 1901. Annexed by the United Kingdom and incorporated into Ankole in 1901.
Russia – Russian Empire; Capital: Saint Petersburg	Widely recognized independent state. Russia had two protectorates, one concession and one autonomous grand duchy: Bukhara (Protectorate); Khiva (Protectorate); Tientsin (Concession from 1900); Finland (Autonomous grand duchy)
=== S ===
San Marino – Most Serene Republic of San Marino; Capital: San Marino	Widely recognized independent state.
Serbia – Kingdom of Serbia; Capital: Belgrade	Widely recognized independent state.
Setul Mambang Segara – Kingdom of Setul Mambang Segara; Capital: Kota Mambang Segara	Widely recognized independent state.
→ Siam – Kingdom of Siam; Capital: Bangkok	Widely recognized independent state. Siam has one vassal state: Champasak (Vassal, to 1904)
Sokoto – Caliphal State in the Bilād as-Sūdān (to 29 July 1903); Capital: Sokoto	Widely recognized independent state until 29 July 1903. Annexed by the United Kingdom and incorporated into the British Northern Nigeria Protectorate on 29 July 1903.
Spain – Kingdom of Spain; Capital: Madrid	Widely recognized independent state. Spain had three colonies, and two possessions: (Spain) Elobey, Annobón and Corisco (Colony); (Spain) Fernando Po (Colony); (Spain) Río Muni (Colony); (Spain) Spanish North Africa (Possession); Spanish Sahara (Possession)
Swaziland – Kingdom of Swaziland (to June 1902); Capital: Bremersdorp	Widely recognized independent state until June 1902. Annexed by the United Kingdom in June 1902.
Sweden and Norway – United Kingdoms of Sweden and Norway (to 7 June 1905); Capital: Stockholm, Christiania	Personal union of the separate kingdoms of Sweden and Norway until 7 June 1905. Union Badge removed on 1 November 1905.
→ → Sweden – Kingdom of Sweden (from 7 June 1905); Capital: Stockholm	Widely recognized independent state from 7 June 1905. In personal union with Norway until 7 June 1905. (Note: Union Badge removed November 1, 1905.)
Switzerland – Swiss Confederation; Capital: Bern	Widely recognized independent state. Switzerland was a federation of 25 cantons. (Note: 25 Cantons: Aargau, Appenzell Ausserrhoden, Appenzell Innerrhoden, Basel-Stadt, Basel-Landschaft, Bern, Fribourg, Geneva, Glarus, Graubünden, Lucerne, Neuchâtel, Nidwalden, Obwalden, Schaffhausen, Schwyz, Solothurn, St. Gallen, Thurgau, Ticino, Uri, Valais, Vaud, Zug, Zürich)
=== T ===
Tagant – Emirate of Tagant (to 1905); Capital: Tidjikja	Widely recognized independent state until 1905. Annexed by France and incorporated into French Mauritania in 1905.
Tonga – Kingdom of Tonga (to May 18, 1900); Capital: Nuku'alofa	Widely recognized independent state until 18 May 1900. Became a protected state of the United Kingdom on 18 May 1900.
Transvaal – South African Republic (to May 31, 1902); Capital: Pretoria	Widely recognized independent state until 31 May 1902. Became a colony of the United Kingdom on 31 May 1902.
Trarza – Emirate of Trarza (to 15 December 1902); Capital: Mederdra	Widely recognized independent state until 15 December 1902. Annexed by France and incorporated into French West Africa on 15 December 1902.
Tui Manuʻa – Tui Manuʻa Confederacy (to 6 July 1904); Capital: Fitiuta	Widely recognized independent state until 6 July 1904. Annexed by the United States and incorporated into American Samoa on 6 July 1904.
=== U ===
United Kingdom – United Kingdom of Great Britain and Ireland; Capital: London	Widely recognized independent state. The UK had sovereignty of the following four autonomous dominions: Australia (Note: Australia formed on 1 January 1901 through the federation of six colonies: New South Wales, Queensland, South Australia, Tasmania, Victoria and Western Australia. These colonies formed the states of New South Wales, Queensland, South Australia, Tasmania, Victoria and Western Australia.) (From 1 January, 1901) including one external territory: Papua (From 18 March 1902); Canada; Newfoundland (From 26 September 1907); New Zealand (From 26 September, 1907) including territories: (New Zealand) Cook Islands (From June 11, 1901); (New Zealand) Niue Island (From 1901); The following are colonies, territories, dependencies and protectorates of the United Kingdom: (United Kingdom) Aden (Protectorate); → Afghanistan (Protectorate under Treaty of Gandamak); (United Kingdom) Amoy (Concession); Anglo-Egyptian Sudan (Condominium of the United Kingdom and the Khedivate of Egypt); (United Kingdom) Ascension Island (Possession); Ashanti (Protectorate, from 1 January 1902); → Bahama Islands (Crown colony); Bahrain (Protectorate); (United Kingdom) Baker Island (Uninhabited possession); Barbados (Crown colony); Barotziland–North-Western Rhodesia (Protectorate); (United Kingdom) Basutoland (Crown colony); (United Kingdom) Bechuanaland (Protectorate); Bermuda (Crown colony); British Central Africa (Protectorate, to 6 July 1907); British Ceylon (Crown colony); British Cyprus (Protectorate); British East Africa (Protectorate); → British Guiana (Colony); British Honduras (Crown colony); British Hong Kong (Crown colony); → British Jamaica (Crown colony); British Leeward Islands (Crown colony); → British Mauritius (Crown colony); → British Somaliland (Crown colony); British Trinidad and Tobago (Crown colony); → British Windward Islands (Crown colony); → Brunei (Protectorate); Cape Colony (Colony); (United Kingdom) Chinde (Concession); Colony of Natal (Colony); Cook Islands (Crown colony to June 11, 1901); Falkland Islands (Crown colony); Federated Malay States (Protectorate); (United Kingdom) Friendly Islands (Tripartite protectorate to 1900, became part of the British Western Pacific Territories); Gambia (Crown colony and protectorate); Gibraltar (Crown colony); (United Kingdom) Gilbert and Ellice Islands (Protectorate); Gold Coast (Crown colony); (United Kingdom) Graham Land (Uninhabited possession); Guernsey (Crown dependency); (United Kingdom) Hankou (Concession); (United Kingdom) Heard Island and McDonald Islands (Uninhabited possession); India - Indian Empire (Empire); (United Kingdom) Isle of Man (Crown dependency); (United Kingdom) Jarvis Island (Uninhabited possession); Jersey (Crown dependency); (United Kingdom) Jiujiang (Concession); Kuwait (Protectorate); Labuan (Crown colony from 1904 to 2 January 1907); Lagos (Colony to February 1906, incorporated into the Southern Nigeria Protectorate); Maldive Islands (Protectorate); Malta (Crown colony); Muscat and Oman (Protectorate); Nepal (Protectorate); → (Dominion of Newfoundland) Newfoundland (Crown colony to 26 September 1907); New Hebrides (Anglo-French condominium, from 20 October 1906); New South Wales (Colony to 1900, became a state of Australia); → (United Kingdom) New Zealand (Colony, to 26 September 1907); (United Kingdom) Niger Districts (Protectorate to 1900, became part of Northern Nigeria); (United Kingdom) Niue Island (1900 to 1901) Protectorate, became a territory of New Zealand); → North Borneo (Protectorate); Northern Nigeria (Protectorate from 1 January 1900); North-Eastern Rhodesia (Protectorate, from 29 January 1900); Northern Territories of the Gold Coast (Protectorate, from 1 January 1902); Nyasaland (Protectorate, from 6 July 1907); (United Kingdom) → Orange River Colony (Colony, from 31 May 1902); British New Guinea (Colony to 18 March 1902, transferred to Australia); (United Kingdom) Redonda (Possession); Rhodesia (Company Rule by British South Africa Company); Queensland (Colony to 1900, became a state of Australia); Saint Helena (Crown colony); Sarawak (Protectorate); Seychelles (Crown colony from 1903); Sierra Leone (Crown colony and protectorate); Sikkim (Protectorate); South Australia (Colony to 1900, became a state of Australia); (United Kingdom) South Orkney Islands (Uninhabited possession from 1908); (United Kingdom) South Shetland Islands (Uninhabited possession from 1908); Southern Nigeria (Protectorate, from 1 January 1900); → Straits Settlements (Crown colony); (United Kingdom) Suez Canal Zone (Crown colony); (United Kingdom) Swaziland (Protectorate, from 1903); Tasmania (Colony to 1900, became a state of Australia); (United Kingdom) Tientsin (Concession); Transvaal Colony (Colony from 31 May 1902); (United Kingdom) Tristan da Cunha (Crown colony); Trucial States (Protectorate); Unfederated Malay States; Kedah (Protectorate); Kelantan (Protectorate); Perlis (Protectorate); Terengganu (Protectorate); (United Kingdom) Uganda (Protectorate); (United Kingdom) Union Islands (Protectorate); Victoria (Colony to 1900, became a state of Australia); (United Kingdom) Victoria Land (Uninhabited possession); (United Kingdom) → Weihai (Concession); Western Australia (Colony to 1900, became a state of Australia); Zanzibar (Protectorate); (United Kingdom) Zhenjiang (Concession)
→ United States – United States of America; Capital: Washington D.C.	Widely recognized independent state. The following are territories of the United States of America: → (United States) Alaska (District); → (United States) American Samoa (Territory); → (United States) Arizona (Territory); → (United States) Bajo Nuevo Bank (Uninhabited territory); Cuba (Territory to 20 May 1902); → (United States) Guam (Territory); Hawaii (Territory); → (United States) Howland Island (Uninhabited territory); → (United States) Indian Territory (Territory to 16 November 1907); → (United States) Johnston Atoll (Uninhabited territory); → (United States) Kingman Reef (Uninhabited territory); → (United States) Middlebrook Island (Uninhabited territory); → (United States) Midway Atoll (Uninhabited territory); → (United States) Navassa Island (Uninhabited territory); → (United States) New Mexico (Territory); Oklahoma (Territory to November 16, 1907); → (United States) Palmyra Atoll (Territory from 14 June 1900); → (United States) Panama Canal Zone (Territory, from 4 May 1904); → (United States) Philippine Islands; Philippine Islands (Territory to 1 July 1902); → (United States) Philippine Islands (Territory from 1 July 1902); → (United States) → Puerto Rico (Territory); → (United States) Quita Sueño Bank (Uninhabited territory); → (United States) Roncador Bank (Uninhabited territory); → (United States) Serrana Bank (Uninhabited territory); → (United States) Serranilla Bank (Uninhabited territory); → (United States) Swan Islands (Uninhabited territory); (United States) Tientsin (Concession until 1901); → (United States) Wake Island (Uninhabited territory)
Upper Aulaqi Sheikhdom (until December 1903); Capital: Sa'id	Widely recognized independent state until December 1903. Annexed by the United Kingdom and incorporated into the Aden Protectorate in December 1903.
Upper Yafa – State of Upper Yafa (until October 1903); Capital: Mahjaba	Widely recognized independent state until October 1903. Annexed by the United Kingdom and incorporated into the Aden Protectorate in October 1903.
Uruguay – Eastern Republic of Uruguay; Capital: Montevideo	Widely recognized independent state.
=== V ===
→ Venezuela – United States of Venezuela; Capital: Caracas	Widely recognized independent state.
=== W ===
Wadai – Wadai Empire; Capital: Abéché	Widely recognized independent state.
Wajoq – Kingdom of Wajoq (to 1906); Capital: Tosora	Widely recognized independent state until 1906. Annexed by the Netherlands and incorporated into the Dutch East Indies in 1906.
Warsangali – Warsangali Sultanate; Capital: Las Khorey	Widely recognized independent state.
Wukari – Wukari Federation (to 1900); Capital: Wukari	Widely recognized independent state until 1900. Annexed by the United Kingdom and incorporated into the Northern Nigeria Protectorate in 1900.
== States with limited independence, sovereignty or recognition == Excluded from the list above are the following noteworthy entities which either were not fully sovereign or did not claim to be independent:
Aceh – Sultanate of Aceh (to 1903); Capital: Kutaraja	Protectorate of the Ottoman Empire. Annexed by the Netherlands in 1903.
→ Acre – Republic of Acre (to March 1900, from November to 24 December 1900, from 27 January to 11 November 1903.) Capital: Cidade do Acre (to 24 December 1900), Antimary (from 27 January 1903).	Unrecognised succesionist state in Bolivia. Intermittently de facto independent until 11 November 1903 and incorporated into Brazil.
Asir – Idrisid Emirate of Asir (from 1907); Capital: Sabya	De facto independent state from 1907.
→ → Australia – Commonwealth of Australia (from 1 January 1901); Capital: Melbourne (de facto seat of government)	Dominion of the United Kingdom. Australia was largely represented by the UK internationally and had little recognition as an independent state. Australia forms on 1 January, 1901 through the federation of six British colonies into states. (Note: Six colonies: New South Wales, Queensland, South Australia, Tasmania, Victoria and Western Australia. These colonies formed the states of New South Wales, Queensland, South Australia, Tasmania, Victoria and Western Australia.) Australia has one External Territory: Papua (External territory, from 18 March 1902)
Canada – Dominion of Canada; Capital: Ottawa	Autonomous dominion of the United Kingdom. Canada was largely represented by the UK internationally and had little recognition as an independent state. Canada was a federation made up of nine provinces and three territories. (Note: 7 provinces: Alberta (from 1 September 1905), British Columbia, New Brunswick, Nova Scotia, Manitoba, Ontario, Prince Edward Island, Quebec and Saskatchewan (from 1 September 1905). 3 territories: Keewatin (until 1 September 1905), North-west Territories (renamed Northwest territories 1906) and the Yukon Territory.)
Champasak – Kingdom of Champasak (to 22 November 1904); Capital: Champasak	Vassal of Siam until 1904. Annexed by France on 22 November 1904.
Chita – Chita Republic (from 22 November 1905 to 22 January 1906); Capital: Chita	Unrecognized state from 22 November 1905 to 22 January 1906. Annexed by Russia on 22 January 1906.
Cruzob – Chan Santa Cruz (to 5 May 1901); Capital: Noh Kah Balam Nah Chan Santa Cruz	De facto independent state until 5 May 1901. Reannexed to Mexico on 5 May 1901.
Crete – Cretan State; Capital: Chania	De facto independent state. Autonomous state of the Ottoman Empire.
Dervish State – Dervish State; Capital: Taleh	Unrecognized state.
Gurian Republic (from 1902 to 1906); Capital: Ozurgeti	Unrecognized state from 1902 to 1906. Annexed by Russia in 1906.
Jungle Nation – Jungle Republic (to 27 February 1900); Capital: Moyobamba	Unrecognized state to 27 February 1900. Annexed by Peru on 27 February 1900.
Kano – Kano Emirate (to 3 February 1903); Capital: Takai	Vassal of the Sokoto Caliphate. Annexed by the United Kingdom and incorporated into the Northern Nigeria Protectorate on 3 February 1903.
Khiva – Khanate of Khiva; Capital: Khiva	Semi-independent state. Under Russian protection.
Kruševo – Republic of Kruševo (from 3 to 13 August 1903); Capital: Kruševo	De facto independent state from 3 to 13 August 1903. Annexed by the Ottoman Empire on 13 August 1903.
Lado – Lado District; Capital: Lado	Unrecognized state. Claimed by the Congo Free State.
Muscat and Oman – Sultanate of Muscat and Oman; Capital: Muscat	De jure independent state. De facto a British protectorate.
Negros – Cantonal Republic of Negros (to 20 August 1901); Capital: Bacolod	Unrecognized state to 20 August 1901. Became a protectorate of the United States on 20 August 1901.
Newfoundland – Dominion of Newfoundland (from 26 September 1907); Capital: St. John's	Autonomous dominion of the United Kingdom from 26 September 1907. Newfoundland was largely represented by the United Kingdom internationally and had little recognition as an independent state.
New Zealand – Dominion of New Zealand (from 26 September 1907); Capital: Wellington	Autonomous dominion of the United Kingdom from 26 September 1907. New Zealand was largely represented by the United Kingdom internationally and had little recognition as an independent state. The following are territories of New Zealand: (New Zealand) Cook Islands (Dependent territory); (New Zealand) Niue Island (Dependent territory)
Philippines – First Philippine Republic (to March 23, 1901); Capital: Several temporary capitals	Unrecognized state until 23 March 1901. Became a Protectorate of the United States on 23 March 1901.
Shuliavka Republic (from 12 to 16 December 1905); Capital: Shuliavka	Unrecognized state from 12 to 16 December 1905. Annexed by Russia on 16 December 1905.
Shuntian Kingdom – Heavenly Kingdom of the Great Mingshun (from 28 to 31 January 1903); Capital: Guangzhou	Unrecognized state from 28 to 31 January 1903. Annexed by the Qing dynasty on 31 January 1903
Strandzha Commune (from 18 August to 8 September 1903); Capital: Malko Tarnovo	Unrecognized state from 18 August to 8 September 1903. Annexed by the Ottoman Empire on 8 September 1903.
Tagalog Republic (de facto independent state, from 6 May 1902 to 14 July 1906); Capital: Morong	Unrecognized state from 6 May 1902 to 14 July 1906.
