= Buzimba =

Kingdom of Buzimba Obukama bwa Buzimba
- 1500s–1901
- Status: Former kingdom
- Government: Monarchy
- Omukama
- History
  - Established: 1500s
  - Incorporated into Ankole Protectorate: 1901
- Today part of: Uganda

Buzimba was a kingdom in what is today Uganda. It was incorporated into the British Ankole protectorate in 1901. It was governed by a monarch known as the Omukama, same name used in other Bantu-speaking monarchies in the Great Lakes region. Buzimba was annexed to the British Ankole Protectorate in 1901 and lost its autonomy and monarchical governance under colonization.

== History ==
Buzimba had been ruled since the 1500s by the Bariisa dynasty which is a branch of the regional Bagahe or Basinga clan cluster that has the eagle as its emblem but also the Ngoobe cow. These rulers were known as Abakama and were in a tributary allegiance with the larger state of for all these centuries that the Banyankore even called the small state Bunyoro after its mother-state according to Karugire and Ahumuza.

Buzimba functioned as an independent polity before the arrival of British colonial administration. Its monarch, the Omukama, exercised political, military, and ritual authority over the kingdom, similar to other contemporary kingdoms in the region such as Tooro, Bunyoro, and Nkore.

In 1901 Buzimba was incorporated into the British Ankole Protectorate, losing its autonomy and traditional monarchical governance under colonial rule. The incorporation reflected the broader consolidation of territories in the region by the British colonial administration during the early 20th century.

== See also ==
- Ankole
- Bantu peoples
- Banyankore
- History of Uganda
- Omukama
