= Muhammad Baffa Takai =

Nigerian politician

Muhammad Bappa Takai

Chairman of Takai
- Incumbent
- Assumed office 2021

Kano State commissioner for science and technology
- In office 2019–2018

Personal details
- Born: 28 August 1968 (age 58) Takai
- Party: All Progressives Congress
- Relations: Married
- Education: Kano State Polytechnic; Bayero University Kano
- Occupation: Politician

Muhammad Bappa Takai is a Nigerian politician who was elected the chairman of Takai Local Government Area of Kano State in January 2021 and he was the commissioner for science, technology and Innovations between 2019 and 2020

== Early life and education ==
Baffa was born in Takai, Kano State, he attended Takai Central Primary School between 1976 and 1982, he also attende Government Secondary School, Rimi between 1982 and 1988. he obtained Diploma in Public Administration from Bayero University Kano and Higher National Diploma in Economics, Cooperative and Management from Kano State Polytechnic.

== Politics ==
Baffa was the chairman of Takai Local Government Area of Kano State between 2007 and 2010 during the administration of governor Ibrahim Shekarau and he contested for the seat of House of Representatives to represent Takai/Sumaila constituency during the 2019 Nigerian general election. After primary election, Baffa sacrificed his candidature to Kawu Sumaila for peace to reign in their party after which Kawu lost primary election to senator Kabiru Ibrahim Gaya in 2018. Baffa was appointed commissioner of science and technology by governor Abdullahi Umar Ganduje where he served for 2 years. and he contested for chairman of Takai and won election in January 2021 and became the Chairman, All Local Government Chairmen of Nigeria, Kano Branch.
