= Buhweju =

Buhweju is a kingdom in what is modern-day Uganda. It was incorporated into the British Ankole protectorate in 1901.It was ruled by an Omugabe, which is often translated as "King of Kings."

The last hereditary Omugabe was Daudi Ndibarema 1901-1967 (“ex-Kangaho”). His father, Omugabe Mugimba Ndagara III, was shot dead on 12 July 1901 at his palace at Kishwegwe, Buhweju by British colonial expedition commander Lt. Lacy.

Buhweju was found in South Western part of Uganda in the hilly highlands.

== Kings of Buhweju (Not in order) ==
- Kinyonyi
- Rugo
- Kateizi
- Ndibarema
- Ndagara
- Kabundami
- Rusharabaga
- Nyamigisha
- Kyangabufunda
- Muguta ya Butaho
- Kashoma IV

== History ==
It was a historic kingdom in modern-day Uganda, was ruled by an Omugabe, meaning “King of Kings.” Incorporated into the British Ankole Protectorate in 1901 through signing the Ankole agreement, it retained cultural significance while losing political autonomy under colonial rule.

== See also ==
- Ankole Kingdom
- Omugabe
- Igara
- Sheema District
- History of Uganda
- British protectorate in Uganda
