= Kitagwenda =

Kitagwenda was a kingdom in Uganda. It was located in what is today Kamwenge District. It was incorporated into the Tooro Kingdom in 1900.
