= Canton of Málaga =

"Short-lived government during Cantonal rebellion"

Canton of Málaga Cantón de Málaga (Spanish)
- 1873–1873
- Flag
- Capital: Málaga
- Government: Commune (junta)
- Historical era: Sexenio Democrático
  - Established: 18 July 1873
  - Disestablished: 19 September 1873
| Preceded by | Succeeded by |
| First Spanish Republic | First Spanish Republic |
- Today part of: Spain

The Canton of Málaga (Spanish: Cantón de Málaga) was a short-lived federal entity that was created during the Cantonal rebellion of 1873, in the First Spanish Republic.

== History ==
=== Proclamation of the canton ===
The First Spanish Republic was proclaimed by the Cortes on 11 February 1873. However, in Málaga the new republican system was not recognized until on 12 February a popular republican uprising took to the streets and erected barricades. Similar events occurred in some smaller towns of the province of Málaga such as Álora, Casarabonela and Antequera, among others. The local authorities finally accepted the new system, but in the following months confrontations (sometimes violent) continued, resulting among others in the assassination of republican mayor Moreno y Picó.

This way, the Canton of Malaga was proclaimed on 21-22 July 1873 after local militias under the command of Eduardo Carvajal took to the streets and liberated previously incarcerated cantonalists.

=== Siege and surrender of the canton ===
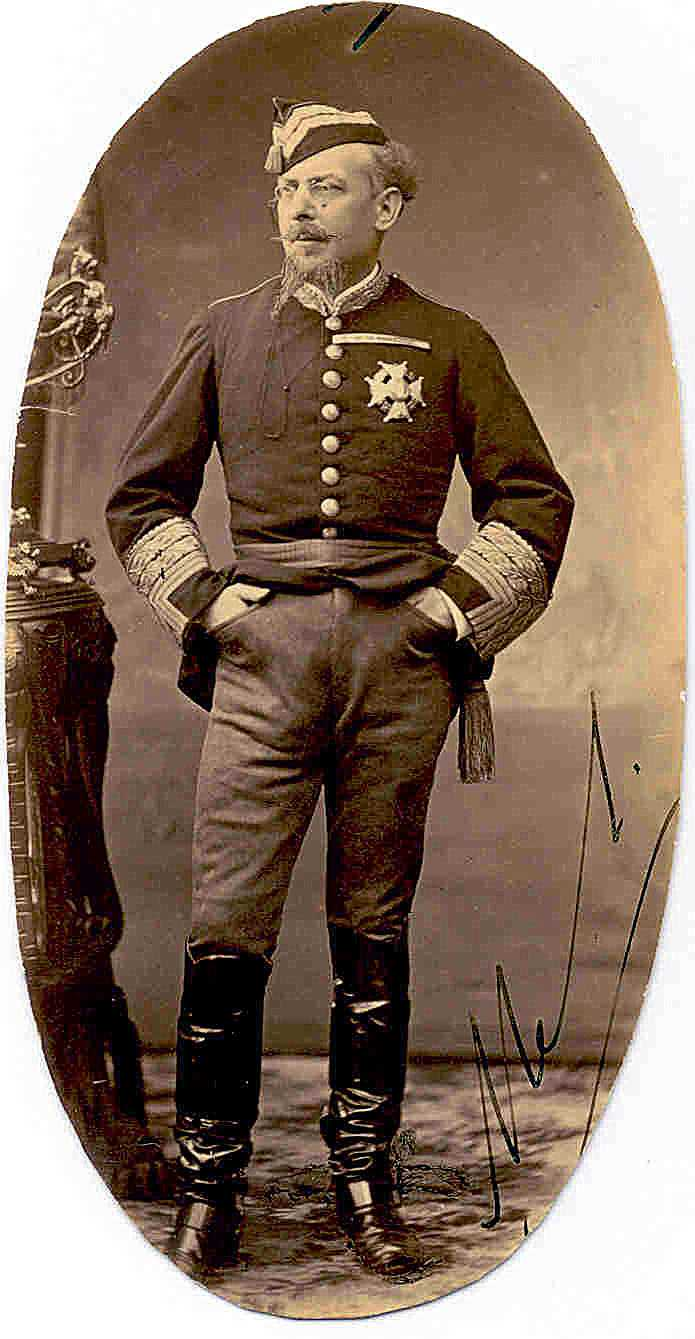
General Manuel Pavía.

On 8 August, after "pacifying" Cádiz and its province, General Manuel Pavía went to Córdoba to fall from there on the cantons of Granada and Málaga. On 12 August, Pavía entered Granada meeting no resistance. He immediately ordered the disarmament of the insurgents in the capital and the province, thus putting an end to the canton of Granada. He then set off for Málaga, defying the government's orders not to go there.

According to Pavía's account, when he received the order not to attack the canton of Malaga, he resigned, but the government did not accept his resignation. Trying to get out of the situation in which he found himself, President Salmerón authorized a small garrison commanded by a government delegate, not from Pavía, to go to Malaga. But once again dissatisfied with the government's decision, Pavía resigned again - "I could not allow any garrison to go to Malaga, without me leading it and entering the city at its head, nor would I allow the popular forces of the city possess weapons," Pavía wrote some time later. While he maintained his new challenge to the government, he terminated the resistance of Écija where, according to Pavía himself, he "made exemplary punishments" that would serve as an example to all the cantonalists of Andalusia who did not surrender to his authority.

On 19 September 1873, Pavía's forces, entered Málaga, thus ending the canton of Malaga and the Andalusian campaign. The Canton of Malaga was the second longest-lasting cantonal rebellion after the Canton of Cartagena.
