= Drobo, Ghana =

Town in Bono Region, Ghana

Drobo
- Town
- Location of Drobo in Bono
- Coordinates: 7°34′59″N 2°47′08″W
- Country: Ghana
- Region: Bono
- Time zone: GMT
  - Summer (DST): GMT

Drobo is a town located in the Jaman South Municipality (formerly in the Brong Ahafo Region) now in Bono Region of Ghana.

== Institutions ==
- Drobo D/A Primary School
