= Kajara =

Former kingdom in Uganda

Kajara was one of the six independent kingdoms which was established after the fall of the Kingdom of Mpororo in 1752. It was ruled by an Omukama. It became a part of the Kingdom of Ankole in 1901.

== See also ==
- Igara
- Nshenyi
- Obwera
- Rujumbura
- Rukiga
