= Administrative divisions of Niger =

Subdivision of Niger

Niger is governed through a four-layer, semi-decentralised series of administrative divisions. Begun in 1992, and finally approved with the formation of the Fifth Republic of Niger on 18 July 1999, Niger has been enacting a plan for decentralisation of some state powers to local bodies. Prior to the 1999-2006 project, Niger's subdivisions were administered via direct appointment from the central government in Niamey. Beginning with Niger's first municipal elections of 2 February 1999, the nation started electing local officials for the first time. Citizens now elect local committee representatives in each commune, chosen by subdivisions of the commune: "quarters" in towns and "villages" in rural areas, with additional groupings for traditional polities and nomadic populations. These officials choose mayors, and from them are drawn representatives to the department level. The departmental council, prefect, and representatives to the regional level are chosen here using the same procedure. The system is repeated at a regional level, with a regional prefect, council, and representatives to the High Council of Territorial Collectives (Le Haut Conseil des Collectivités Territoriales HCCT). The HCCT has only advisory powers, but its members (regions, departments, and communes) have some financial, planning, educational and environmental powers. The central government oversees this process through the office of the Minister of State for the Interior, Public Safety and Decentralization.

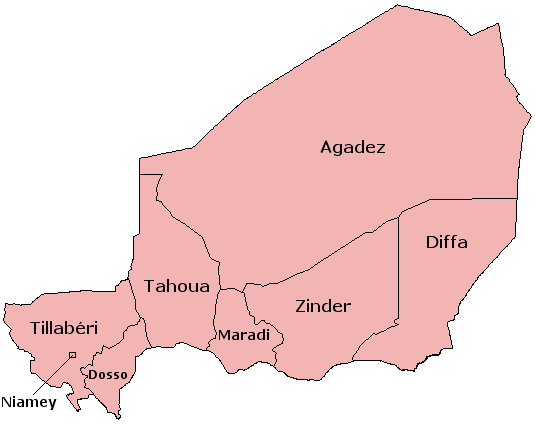
Regions of Niger

== Current administrative structure ==
Niger is divided into seven regions (French: régions; singular – région). Each region's capital is the same as its name. Additionally, the national capital, Niamey, comprises a capital district.

=== Regions of Niger ===
- Agadez Region
- Diffa Region
- Dosso Region
- Maradi Region
- Tahoua Region
- Tillabéri Region
- Zinder Region

The regions are subdivided into departments and communes. As of 2005, there were 36 départements, divided into 265 communes, 122 cantons and 81 groupements. The latter two categories cover all areas not covered by urban communes (population over 10000) or rural communes (population under 10000), and are governed by the department, whereas communes have (since 1999) elected councils and mayors. Additional semi-autonomous sub-divisions include sultanates, provinces and tributaries (tribus). The Nigerien government estimates there were an additional 17000 villages administered by rural communes, while there were a number of quartiers (boroughs or neighborhoods) administered by urban communes.

== Restructuring ==
Prior to the devolution program in 1999–2006, those regions were styled departments. The next level down (arrondissements) were renamed departments.

=== 1992 division ===
Tillabéri department was created in 1992, when Niamey Region (then called "department") was split, with the area immediately outside Niamey renamed as the capital district.

== Historical evolution ==
Prior to independence, Niger was divided into sixteen cercles as second-level administration divisions: Agadez, Birni N'Konni, Dogondoutchi, Dosso, Filingué, Gouré, Madaoua, Magaria, Maradi, N'Guigmi, Niamey, Tahoua, Téra, Tessaoua, Tillabéry, and Zinder. Their capitals had the same names as the cercle.

After independence, the 31 December 1961 Law of territorial organization created 31 circonscriptions. The 16 colonial cercles continued to exist, and served as a level of division above these circonscriptions. Four cercles (Dogondoutchi, Filingué, N'Guigmi, and Téra) had only one circonscription. The Law of August 14, 1964 then reorganized the country into seven departments, adopting the French second-level administration naming system, in contrast to their neighboring country Mali, which retained the colonial cercles and regions.

== See also ==
- Regions of Niger
- Departments of Niger
- Communes of Niger
- List of FIPS region codes (M-O) for the department codes under the FIPS 10-4 standard.
