= Takai =

- LGA and town
- Interactive map of Takai
- Location in Nigeria
- Coordinates: 11°35′N 9°07′E
- Country: Nigeria
- State: Kano State

Area
  - Total: 598 km^{2} (231 sq mi)

Population (2006 census)
  - Total: 202,743
  - Density: 339/km^{2} (878/sq mi)
- Time zone: UTC+1 (WAT)
- 3-digit postal code prefix: 712
- ISO 3166 code: NG.KN.TK

Takai is a town and Local Government Area in Kano State, Nigeria, on the A237 highway.

It has an area of 598 km^{2} and a population of 202,743 at the 2006 census.

The postal code of the area is 712.

== Geography ==
Takai Local Government Area has an average temperature of 33 degrees Celsius or 91 degrees Fahrenheit with a total area of 598 square kilometres or 231 square miles. The dry and wet seasons are the two main seasons experienced by the Local Government Area; the dry seasons often persist longer than the rainy seasons.

== Religion ==
The two main religions practice in Takai are Islam and Christianity.

== Economy ==
In Takai Local Government Area, farming is a major economic activity. A range of crops, including rice, groundnuts, millet, and sorghum, are grown there. In the Local Government Area, a range of animals are also raised and marketed, including sheep, goats, and cows. The people of Takai Local Government Area also engage in significant trading, food processing, and pottery as economic pursuits.

== Notable people ==
- Muhammad Baffa Takai – Current chairman of Takai and former Kano State commissioner for science and technology
