= Nshenyi =

Nshyeni was one of the six independent kingdoms which was established after the fall of the Kingdom of Mpororo in 1752. It was ruled by an Omukama. It is located in Kitwe, Ntungamo, Uganda. In 1901, it became a part of the Kingdom of Ankole, an ancient Ugandan kingdom that encompassed the former independent kingdoms of Igara, Sheema, Bweju, and parts of Mpororo. Today Nshyeni is a village located about 10 kilometers away from Uganda's border with Rwanda and Tanzania. It also became a cultural center, serving as a hub for community tourism. It is being promoted a homestead where visitors can experience the local's culture and way of life.

== Geography ==
Nsheny is located in an area of many hills, covered in savanna grass and acacia trees. There is a large amount of agricultural crops in the area, especially bananas.

== See also ==
- Igara
- Kajara
- Obwera
- Rujumbura
- Rukiga
