= Rujumbura =

Rujumbura was one of the six independent kingdoms which was established after the fall of the Kingdom of Mpororo in 1752 in present day Rukungiri, south western Uganda. It was ruled by an Omukama from the Beene Kirenzi sub-clan of the Abashambo.

It is more associated with Kigezi than Ankole. Efforts to bring it under Bahinda rule of Ankole in the early 1900s remained futile due to the effective resistance of the Rujumbura people under Omukama Makobore of the Abashambo clan.

Rujumbura kingdom was ruled by the following kings:

- Omukama Kirenzi
- Omukama Rwebiraro
- Omukama Nyinamanyonyi
- Omukama Muhoozi
- Omukama Makobore
- Omukama Karegyesa

The British invasion of Rujumbura through their system of indirect rule and the abolition of kingdoms by the Government of Uganda under President Milton Obote in 1967 contributed to the collapse of the Kingdom of Rujumbura.

Despite efforts to have Rujumbura restored along with other Mpororo states, there have not been any positive results.

== See also ==
- Igara
- Kajara
- Nshenyi
- Obwera
- Rukiga
