= Obwera =

Kingdom in Uganda

Obwera was one of the six independent kingdoms in present-day Uganda which were established after the fall of the Kingdom of Mpororo in 1752. It was ruled by an Omukama. It became a part of the Kingdom of Ankole in 1901.

== See also ==
- Igara
- Kajara
- Nshenyi
- Rujumbura
- Rukiga
