= Kingdom of Igara =

18th century Kingdom

The Kingdom of Igara traces its origin from the Kingdom of Mpororo in southwest Uganda. Igara is now the name of a county in Bushenyi District, surrounding the town of Ishaka.

The Kingdom of Mpororo dates back in 1650 and was established by great men of the past. Mpororo's first King: Omukama Kamurari was enthroned followed by Omukama Muntu, Kazi, Karagaire, Muzoora, Ntagu, Kinwa and Kamurara II. In 1753 Prince KAHAYA RUTINDANGYEZI RWA MURORWA fought his brother Omukama KAMURARI II and took over the throne. This resulted in the disintegration of the Kingdom of Mpororo and six (6) states emerged from the greater Mpororo Kingdom all led my KAHAYA RUTINDANGYEZI's sons. Under Kahaya Rutindangyezi-from whom all the Bashambo clans descended, Mpororo extended its frontiers to include all Kigezi (except the modern Bafumbira saza and part of Kinkizi), the Ankole sazas of Kajara, Igara, sheema and Rwampara (except the low ground south of the Rwizi River) and the northern portion of Ruanda. Kahaya had a large family, from whom the important sub-clans of the Bashambo trace their origin, and its members established themselves in various parts of his kingdom. The rule of the 6 states went as follows; Nshenyi was taken over by Prince Rukaari, Rujumbura by the Great Prince Kirenzi, Kajara by Prince Kihondwa, Rukiga by Prince Rugambagye, Igara by Prince Kaitezi and Obwera remained under the rule of their father Omukama Kahaya.

Prince Kateizi was sent to Igara with the royal drum “Kihoza” (meaning pleader in Runyankole). He settled in a place called Bumbaire, became the Omukama of Igara and gave birth to a son named NTAMBIKO and other children. Later on, Omukama Kateizi passed on and was succeeded by his brother Mafundo because his rightful heir and son- Ntambiko was still a small boy. This led to divisions amongst the people in the Kingdom, the people who followed Mafundo called themselves Abaine Mafundo and those that followed Ntambiko the rightful heir to the Igara throne called themselves Abagoma. After the war between Uncle and Nephew, Ntambiko remained with the royal drum kihoza and migrated from Bumbaire to Kyeitembe as the Omukama. The baine Mafundo kept migrating from place to place i.e. Irembezi, Rukararwe and Rwenjeru. Prince Ntambiko decided to go to war with his Uncle Mafundo, word around Igara spread that Prince Ntambiko wanted to go to war, when his Uncle Mafundo got to know that his nephew had powerful weapons to fight him and that he (Mafundo) wouldn't win the war against his nephew; Mafundo then sent a message to Ntambiko telling him that they should both give up on fighting and avoid bloodshed and unite as a family. Mafundo surrendered and gave his nephew Prince Ntambiko his rights as the Omukama. Mafundo later met with Ntambiko and agreed that Mafundo be the one in charge of the throne, while Ntambiko be in charge of the "Engoma" meaning the royal drum Kihoza, that's why his descendants up to now are called “Abagoma”.

The Bagoma settled in a place called "Kyeitembe" located in the current Bushenyi district. Until today and the BeeineMafundo, after the Omukama Kajuga killed his brother Kaihura for committing adultery with his wife started migrating. They left Kyeitembe and went to Rweibare, then Rwemikokora, Kyeshero, Keirere, Igorora, Rwakararwe, Rwihura, Rwekitoma etc. When Ntambiko and his siblings who are not known left Bumbaire and settled in Kyeitembe, the people who remained in Bumbaire were named 'Abashegu". After Ntambiko's death, Keishengura took over “Kihoza”, followed by Bucoco, then Mujuni, then Kamunyu, then Tibamanya, then Mutimbo, then G.W Binyindo in 1934.

Mutimbo Rubarenzya left Kyeitembe with the drums between 1928 and 1921. Later in 1936, George William Binyindo accepted Christianity; he denounced his leadership, acquired a Christian name and sent the drums to Kozi who was the "Nyakahita" of Kyabugimbi in what is now Bushenyi Municipality. When Kozi passed on, the drum Kihoza was taken over by Katana, when he also passed on, it was taken to Rwamyaniko, then Amosi Kabuga, Rumanzi's grandson.

In 1878, the British asked the then Omukama of Igara to go to Mbarara and make an agreement with Omugabe(King) of Nkole, but according to custom, fellow kings were not supposed to meet each other, to avoid humiliation, the Omukama stabbed himself in the stomach. After his death the 1900 Agreement was made and brought an end to the Igara Kingdom making it chiefdom and Mukotani was appointed as the chief of Igara.

All the split states including Igara were independent until the time of colonization when the British failed to recognize these states and were forced to join the then Nkole Kingdom that was a bit more powerful than each of these states. Some states were forcefully made to agree to join the new party to form the Ankole Kingdom. The leadership of those that completely refused to join the new partnership was suppressed to cease. The Bahinda ruling class of Nkole dominated the administration of the expanded Ankole Kingdom at the time of colonization. Later on Obote the President of Uganda at the time, abolished Kingdoms and all kingdoms in Uganda including the Mighty Buganda Kingdom collapsed. In the Year 1993 with the amendment of the National constitution, the Kingdoms were then freed to re -emerge and seek for their restoration. All the other Kingdoms that were organized were restored, but the Ankole Kingdom that was dominated by royal Bahinda failed to re-organize herself because the formerly marginalized Bahororo had started to demand their share in the administration of the Kingdom.

== See also ==
- Kajara
- Nshenyi
- Obwera
- Rujumbura
- Rukiga
