= Omukama =

Title given to the monarchs in the Kingdoms of Bunyoro and Tooro

Omukama (Nyoro pronunciation: [omukâma], Tooro pronunciation: [omukáma], 'king, lord', pl. : Abakama) is a title used in Uganda and neighbouring countries for monarchs, especially in the kingdoms of Bunyoro and Tooro. They were recognized by the colonial powers of Great Britain when Uganda was made a republic. After reestablishing the Ugandan kingdoms in the 1990s, the Omukama are accepted as kings with cultural functions.

== See also ==
- Omukama of Bunyoro
- Omukama of Tooro
