= Upper Ivory Coast =

Former administrative region

Upper Ivory Coast (French: Haute-Côte d'Ivoire) was an administrative region within the French colony of Ivory Coast, French West Africa from 1938 to 1947, consisting of most territories that had previously belonged to the colony of Upper Volta (present-day Burkina Faso). The headquarters of the Upper Ivory Coast administrative region were at first in Ouagadougou but were later moved to Bobo Dioulasso. Tens of thousands of forced labourers were brought from Upper Ivory Coast to plantations in the southern areas of the colony, through a supposedly voluntary recruitment scheme. The dominant group in Upper Ivory Coast society, the Mossi aristocracy, resented the loss of Upper Volta as a separate colony and pressured French authorities to re-establish it.

== History ==
=== Trifurcation of Upper Volta ===
On September 3, 1932, a French government decree was issued, whereby the colony of Upper Volta was abolished and its lands were split between Ivory Coast, French Soudan and Niger. The decree on the trifurcation of Upper Volta came into effect on December 31, 1932. The Cercles of Bobo-Dioulasso, Gaoua, Kaya, Koudougou, Ouagadougou and Tenkodogo, as well as the eastern (right bank) parts of the Dédougou Cercle, were merged into Ivory Coast. The areas merged into Ivory Coast represented more than half of the territory of Upper Volta and some two-thirds of its population. The merger of most of the Upper Voltan Cercles into the Ivory Coast colony sought to facilitate the transplantation of Upper Voltan forced labourers to plantations further south.

=== Creation of Upper Ivory Coast ===
On July 13, 1937, a French government decree was issued outlining the creation of Upper Ivory Coast as an administrative unit within the Ivory Coast colony. The July 13, 1937, decree signed by President Albert Lebrun outlined that Upper Ivory Coast would be an administrative region whose borders would be decided by the Governor-General of French West Africa, that the Governor-General would be represented in the region by a senior administrator based in Ouagadougou and that the Minister of Colonies would be tasked with ensuring the implementation of the decree. Upper Ivory Coast became a single administrative unit under Resident-Superior Edmond Louveau based at Ouagadougou on January 1, 1938, gathering the cercles of Ivory Coast previously belonging to Upper Volta.

=== Plantation labour recruitment scheme ===
Each subdivision of Upper Ivory Coast had been assigned an arbitrary quota of 5% of its population that would be recruited for plantation labour in the southern parts of Ivory Coast. Ivory Coast Governor Horace Valentin Crocicchia claimed the officially registered labour contracts were completely voluntary. Labourers were distributed according to the instructions of Regional Committees. Contrary to the notion that the labour recruitment system was a modality for building a modernized economy, some 90% of the Upper Ivory Coast labourers sere sent to private enterprises (about half of them to cocoa plantations and the other half to coffee plantations). During the Popular Front years, some 33,000 labourers were recruited annually, and by 1939 annual recruitment had increased to 35,000. In 1939 a meningitis epidemic ravaged Upper Ivory Coast, killing thousands.

=== World War II ===
Following the Fall of France, on June 18, 1940, the French West Africa Governor-General Léon Cayla declared loyalty to Marshal Philippe Pétain (who would set up the Vichy France regime after the armistice with Germany), but Louveau telegraphed support for Charles de Gaulle. Some French soldiers left Bobo-Dioulasso to join de Gaulle's Free French movement. On July 22, 1940, Louveau met the newly appointed High Commissioner for French Africa Pierre Boisson in Bobo-Dioulasso to discuss the terms of Vichy and de Gaulle. Louveau was ordered to Dakar, where he was arrested and then imprisoned in Bamako and Algiers before being sent to mainland France to stand trial for treason. Annual plantation labour recruitment in Upper Ivory Coast declined to 31,000 in 1940 as a result of French colons (colonists) having been mobilized into military service. Moreover French officials had detected increased emigration by labourers to the Gold Coast by early 1940, thus lowering the number of labourers available for work in southern Ivory Coast. Crocicchia came to fear that the labour reserve of Upper Ivory Coast was at the verge of being depleted.

Crocicchia's socialist successor as Ivory Coast Governor Hubert Deschamps noted that the vast majority of Upper Ivory Coast labourers were forcefully recruited through administrative measures. Deschamps did not agree to recruitment above the 5% quota of each subdivision. However, the exodus to the Gold Coast continued, with many villages becoming largely deserted.

On September 16, 1941, Moro Naba Koom II petitioned the Lieutenant-Governor of the Ivory Coast and Boisson to recreate Upper Volta as a separate colony. French authorities rejected the petition. On March 23, 1942, Moro Naaba Kom II died in Ouagadougou. The new Moro Naba, Moro Naba Sagha II, pledged allegiance to Vichy. Moro Naba Sagha II, as head of the Mossi aristocracy based in Ouagadougou, functioned as a key broker for the labour recruitment scheme. In November 1942 French West Africa switched allegiance from Vichy to de Gaulle.

In 1942 annual plantation labour recruitment had increased to 41,000. In 1943 annual labour recruitment from Upper Ivory Coast stood at 55,000. After the January 1944 Brazzaville Conference, the Ivory Coast Governor André Latrille sought to gradually phase out the forced labour system. Recruitment would be lowered from 54,000 to 38,000 in the first year, then to 20,000 in the second year, to 10,000 in the third year, to 4,500 in the fourth year and down to zero in five years. The cuts in labour supply would mainly affect coffee production, which was deemed unnecessary for the war effort. The planned reductions of forced labour supply prompted protests from European plantation owners.

=== End of the forced labour and reestablishment of Upper Volta ===
In 1945 the Mossi organized the movement Union pour la défense des intérêts de la Haute Volta (UDIHV) to call for the recreation of Upper Volta. Ahead of the October 21, 1945, Constituent Assembly election Moro Naba Sagha II selected as his candidate the Baloum Naba Tenga Ouedraogo. The candidate of Lower Ivory Coast was Félix Houphouët-Boigny. A third candidate, Daniel Ouezzin Coulibaly, withdrew his candidacy before the voting. Houphouët-Boigny won the seat with 13,750 votes, against 12,900 for Ouedraogo. A fourth candidate, Kouamé Binzème of the Patriotic Action Committee of Ivory Coast (CAPACI), received a few hundred votes.

In January 1946 the government of the Ivory Coast issued a decree on the 'suppression of forced recruitment in Upper Ivory Coast'. The April 13, 1946, Houphouët-Boigny Law outlawed forced labour in French West Africa. On April 30, 1946, native customary law was abolished in French West Africa. On May 7, 1946, the inhabitants of French West Africa were declared to be citizens (albeit not necessarily holding voting rights) rather than just subjects. In July 1946 the Moro Naba Sagha II petitioned for the re-establishment of Upper Volta, a request to which the Minister of the Overseas Marius Moutet replied sympathetically on September 3, 1946. Ahead of the November 1946 French National Assembly election Houphouët-Boigny and Moro Naba Sagha II negotiated a joint candidate list, which allowed for the election of a Mossi deputy to the French National Assembly. From the Ivory Coast the elected deputies were Houphouët-Boigny, Coulibaly and the Mossi candidate Philippe Zinda Kaboré.

On September 4, 1947, the National Assembly reestablished Upper Volta with its pre-1932 borders.

== Administrative divisions ==
Upper Ivory Coast was divided into cercles. There were two (European-African) mixed communes, Ouagadougou and Bobo-Dioulasso, each under an administrative officer as city mayor and with a nominated advisory council.

Cercles of Upper Ivory Coast
Cercle Headquarters	Area (sq.km)	District Headquarters
Bobo-Dioulasso	41,483	Banfora, Houndé
Gaoua	21,204	Batié, Diébougou
Kaya	17,500	
Koudougou	26,329	Boromo, Dédougou, Yako
Ouagadougou	36,301	Léo, Pô
Tenkodogo	12,600	
