= Naba Baongo II =

37th king of the Mossi people of Burkina Faso

Naba Baongo II (born 1956) is the current Mogho Naba, the constituent king of the Mossi people of Burkina Faso. According to oral tradition, he is the 37th king of the Mossi. As king, he is seen as a symbol of tradition and still retains influence in political matters within the country (albeit, no longer holding sovereignty), and elected MPs, ministers, and ambassadors are known to seek his approval.

In official functions, Baongo only speaks in his native language Mooré. He does not speak French, despite knowing the language. His spokesperson, Larle Naba, is used to communicate with guests. When questioned on this, he explained that he doesn't communicate in French so as to help preserve his native language and culture.

== History ==
Baongo was crowned the Mogho Naba on 21 December 1982, succeeding his father, Naba Kougri.

His authority was significantly curtailed during the presidency of Thomas Sankara. The Mogho Naba was confined to his palace in Ouagadougou by Sankara, and was forbidden to hold court during his presidency.

As Mogho Naba, Baongo plays an important political role as a 'neutral' mediator. In 2015, he was credited with playing a key role in brokering a return to civilian rule after the 2015 Burkina Faso coup attempt, in-effect, avoiding potential violence. Following these events, on 26 September 2015, he was awarded the Peace Prize by Les Amis du Burkina Faso for his role in brokering peace.

In 2017, he won the Macky Sall Prize for African Dialogue for his role in resolving crises in Burkina Faso.

On 18 April 2023, Baongo donated to the Burkinabe national government to help with the ongoing jihadist insurgency. The donation amounted to 7 million CFA francs, as well as bags of rice, corn, millet, sorghum, and sugar.

== Bibliography ==
Baongo has released a couple books, containing collections of his poems.

- Poèmes de l'Empereur (2010)
- Le Soleil Éclatant (2019)

== See also ==
- Moro-Naba Ceremony
