= Indirect rule =

System of governance used by colonial powers

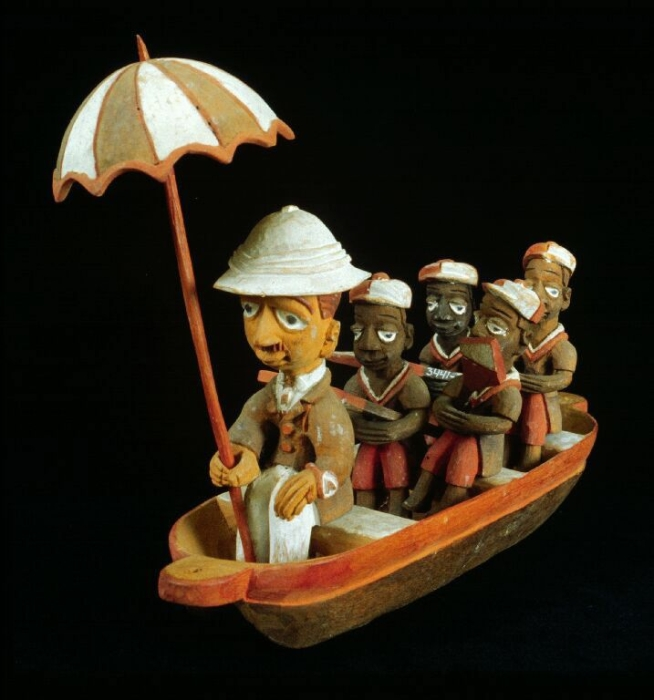
A 20th century Yoruba (Nigerian) depiction of a British District Officer on tour of indirect rulers

Indirect rule is a term used to describe governance by imperial powers wherein pre-existing or indigenous power structures were co-opted for local control. This was particularly used by colonial empires like the British Empire and French Colonial Empire to control many of their possessions in Africa and Asia. Examples of indirect rule occur in French Algeria and French Tunisia, the Dutch East Indies, the Portuguese Angola and Portuguese Mozambique, and Rwanda and Burundi. These dependencies were often called "protectorates" or "trucial states".

Through this system, the day-to-day government and administration of both small and large areas were left in the hands of traditional rulers, who gained prestige and the stability and protection afforded by the Pax Britannica (in the case of British territories) in exchange for lost control of their external affairs, and often of taxation, communications, and other matters of governance. Indirect rule was usually effected with a small number of European "advisors", who effectively oversaw the government of large numbers of people spread over extensive areas.

== British Empire ==
Some British colonies were ruled directly by the Colonial Office in London, while others were ruled indirectly through local rulers who are supervised behind the scenes by British advisors. The nature of such a system was effectively explained by the British Prime Minister, Salisbury, who said of Zanzibar, made a protectorate of Britain in 1890, that:

The condition of a protected dependency is more acceptable to the half civilized races, and more suitable for them than direct dominion. It is cheaper, simpler, less wounding to their self-esteem, gives them more career as public officials, and spares of unnecessary contact with white men.

The Princely states of the British Raj in South Asia were also ruled indirectly, with the Indian territories ruled indirectly experiencing similar effects to those in Africa that experienced indirect rule.

=== In Africa ===
Concepts and practices of vassalage, subjugation, and imperialism existed in various pre-colonial African societies and states, such as the Songhai Empire and Asante Empire. Nonetheless, the ideological underpinnings, as well as the practical application, of 'indirect rule' in the British administration of Uganda and Nigeria are traced back to the work of Frederick Lugard, the High Commissioner of the Protectorate of Northern Nigeria from 1899 to 1906, who outlined a means of governing large territories and populations using small numbers of foreign administrators in his work The Dual Mandate in British Tropical Africa.

According to Lugard, indirect rule was a political doctrine which held that, because the Europeans and Africans were culturally different, Africans had to be ruled through their own institutions. To achieve this objective, he argued for a system wherein:

- Chiefs and or Royalty continued to exercise their traditional powers over their subjects;
- Chiefs were appointed for areas with no chiefs; and
- Aspects of traditional government repugnant to “European ideas of what constituted government were modified.” e.g. the abolition of human sacrifice.

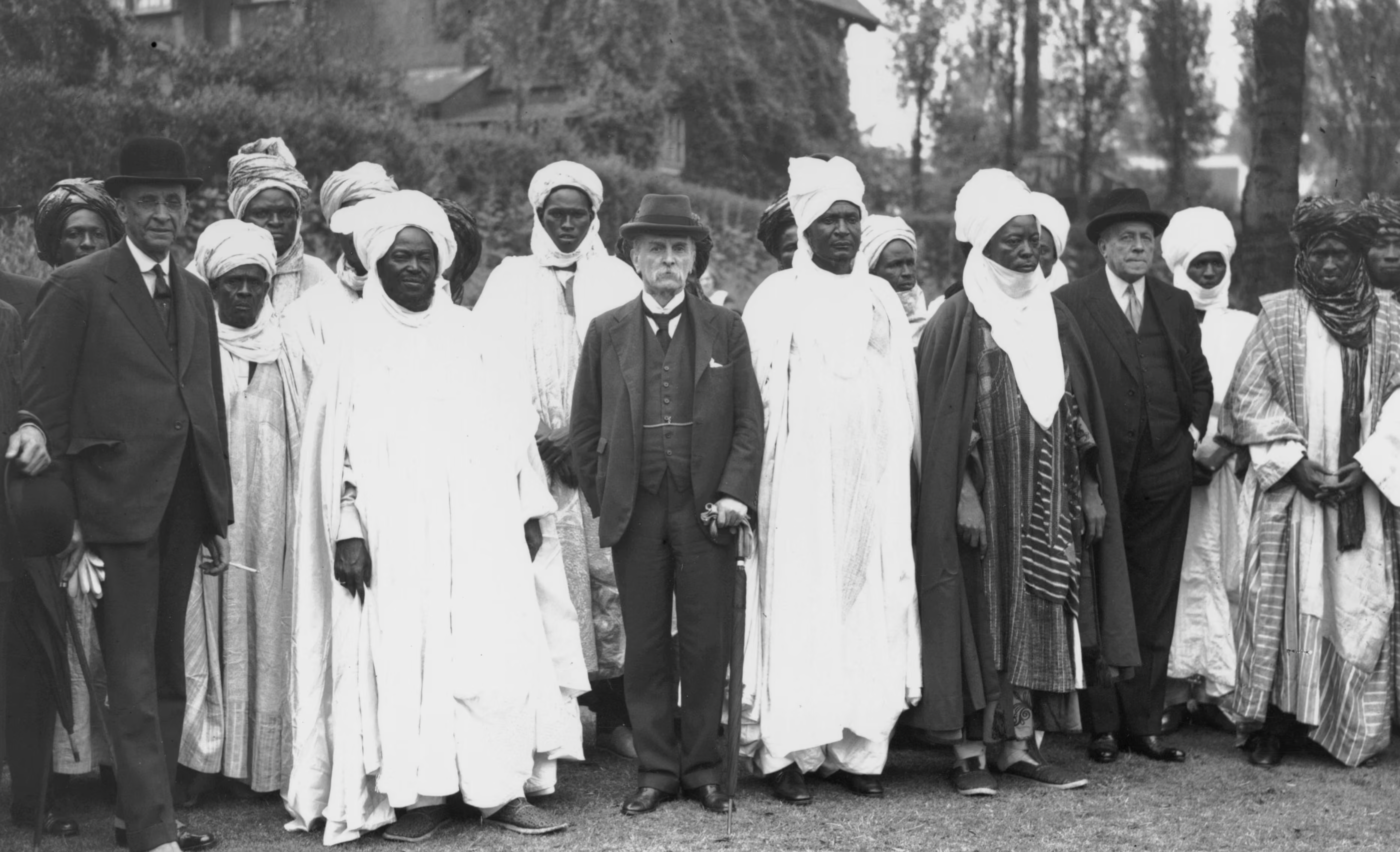
Frederick Lugard (centre) with Sultan Hasan I of Sokoto, Emir Usman I of Gwandu and Emir Abdullahi Bayero of Kano at the London Zoological Gardens (1934)

There were practical reasons for this concern. Though interested in economically benefitting from their new colonies, the British were not prepared to pay for colonial administration, nor did they have enough resources to finance it. This economic question coupled with the shortage of or lack of European personnel in Africa at the time, convinced the British that it would be cheaper to use the traditional institutions to achieve the same objective.

The nature and operation of indirect rule in Northern Nigeria amply confirm these contentions. When Lugard and his men conquered the Sokoto Caliphate of Northern Nigeria in the early 20th century, his limited resources in terms of men and money, made rule of the vast territory highly impracticable. The hierarchical nature of Sokoto's political structure, comprising various emirs overseen by the sultan of Sokoto, was conducive for the system of indirect rule because the British could control the emirs and the emirs in turn could control their people. Lugard instituted a system whereby external, military, and tax control were operated by the British; while every other aspect of life was left to local pre-conquest indigenous aristocracies who may have sided with the British during or after their conquest.

In the mid-1920s, the British implemented the system of indirect rule in Tanganyika.

== Practical implementation ==
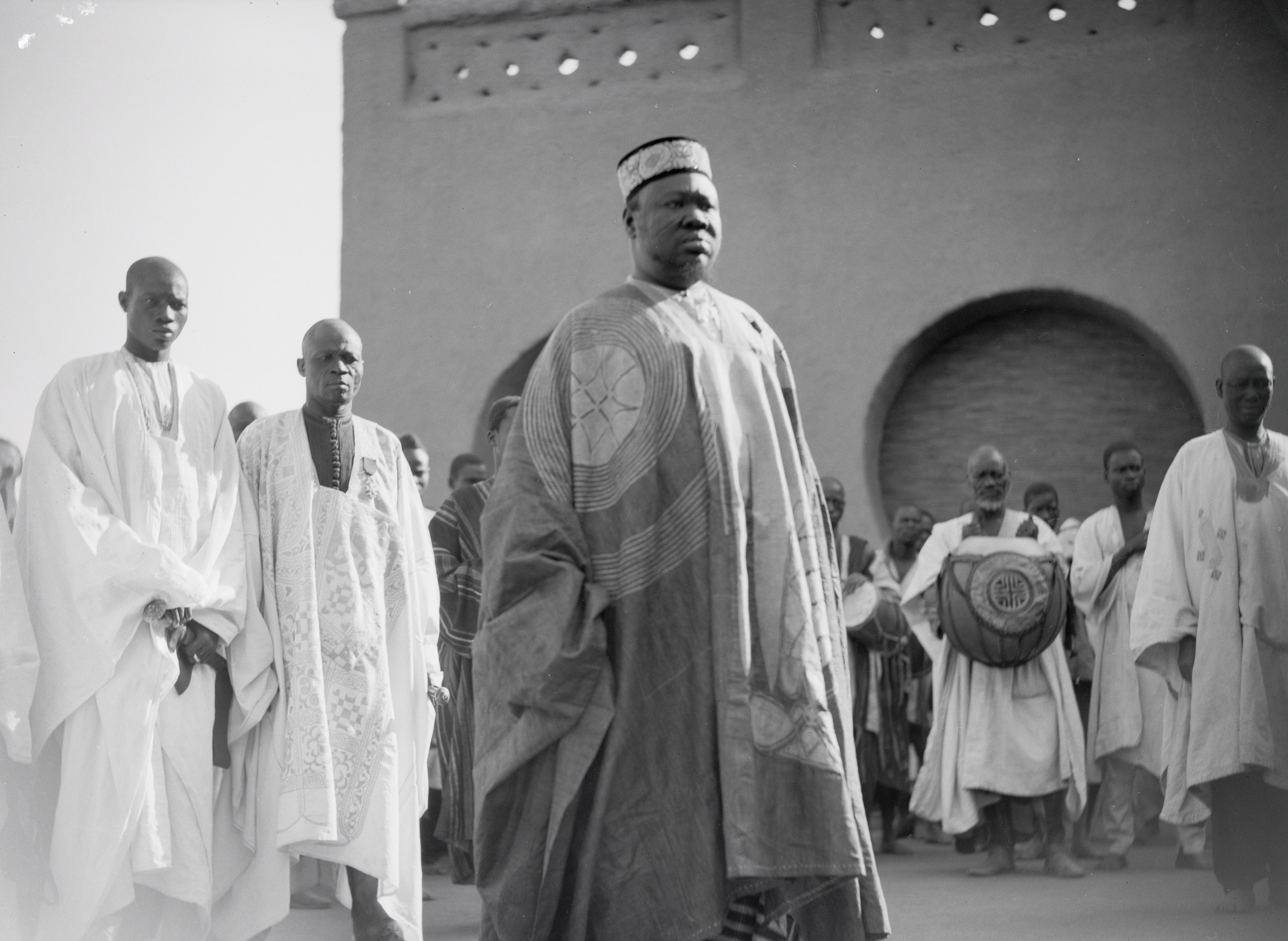
Naaba Koom II, king of the Mossi in French Upper Volta, pictured in 1930. Preservation of precolonial political units was the basis of indirect rule in British and French empires.

Indirect rule was cheaper and easier for the European powers and, in particular, it required fewer administrators, but had a number of problems. In many cases, European authorities empowered local traditional leaders, as in the case of the monarchy of Uganda, but if no suitable leader could be found (in the traditional Western sense of the term), the Europeans would simply choose local rulers to suit them. This was the case in Kenya and Southern Nigeria, and the new leaders, often called "warrant chiefs", were not always supported by the local population.

The European ruling classes also often chose local leaders with similar traits to their own, despite these traits not being suited to native leadership. Many were conservative elders, and thus indirect rule fostered a conservative outlook among the indigenous population and marginalised the young intelligentsia. Written laws, which replaced oral laws, were less flexible to the changing social nature, old customs of retribution and justice were removed or banned, as well as the removal of more violent punishments. Furthermore, leaders empowered by the governments of European powers were often not familiar with their new tasks, such as recruitment and tax.

== Interpretations ==
From the early 20th century, French and British writers helped establish a dichotomy between British indirect rule, exemplified by the Indian princely states and by Lugard's writings on the administration of northern Nigeria, and French colonial direct rule. As with British theorists, French colonial officials like Félix Eboué or Robert Delavignette wrote and argued throughout the first half of the 20th century for a distinct French style of rule that was centralized, uniform, and aimed at assimilating colonial subjects into the French polity.

French rule, sometimes labeled Jacobin, was said in these writings to be based on the twin ideologies of the centralized unitary French government of the Metropole, with the French colonial ideology of Assimilation. Colonial Assimilation argued that French law and citizenship was based on universal values that came from the French Revolution. Mirroring French domestic citizenship law, French colonial law allowed for anyone who could prove themselves culturally French (the "Évolués") to become equal French citizens. In French West Africa, only parts of the Senegalese "Four Communes" ever extended French citizenship outside a few educated African elite.

While making more subtle distinctions, this model of direct versus indirect rule was dominant in academia from the 1930s until the 1970s.

Academics since the 1970s have problematised the Direct versus Indirect Rule dichotomy, arguing the systems were in practice intermingled in both British and French colonial governance, and that the perception of indirect rule was sometimes promoted to justify quite direct rule structures.

Mahmood Mamdani and other academics have discussed extensively how both direct and indirect rule were attempts to implement identical goals of foreign rule. They emphasize how "indirect" strategy helped to create ethnic tensions within ruled societies which persist in hostile communal relations and dysfunctional strategies of government. Mamdani, in his work Citizen and Subject, himself described the problems indirect rule aimed to solve as 'The Native Question', famously describing the system as "decentralised despotism".

Some political scientists have even expanded the debate on how direct versus indirect rule experiences continue to affect contemporary governance into how governments which have never experienced being under colonial rule function.

== See also ==
- Analysis of Western European colonialism and colonization
- Bussa revolt – a 1915 uprising against indirect rule in Northern Nigeria
- Neocolonialism
- Puppet state
- Vassal state
- Self-governing colony – Type of British colony with its own elected government

== Sources and references ==
- Michael Crowder. Indirect Rule: French and British Style. Africa: Journal of the International African Institute, Vol. 34, No. 3. (Jul., 1964), pp. 197–205.
- Paul Rich . The Origins of Apartheid Ideology: The Case of Ernest Stubbs and Transvaal Native Administration, c.1902-1932. African Affairs, Vol. 79, No. 315. (Apr., 1980), pp. 171–194.
- Omipidan Teslim

Indirect Rule in Nigeria OldNaija

- H. F. Morris . A History of the Adoption of Codes of Criminal Law and Procedure in British Colonial Africa, 1876–1935. Journal of African Law, Vol. 18, No. 1, Criminal Law and Criminology. (Spring, 1974), pp. 6–23.
- Jonathan Derrick. The 'Native Clerk' in Colonial West Africa. African Affairs, Vol. 82, No. 326. (Jan., 1983), pp. 61–74.
- Diana Wylie. Confrontation over Kenya: The Colonial Office and Its Critics 1918–1940. The Journal of African History, Vol. 18, No. 3. (1977), pp. 427–447.
- P. A. Brunt . Empires: Reflections on British and Roman Imperialism. Comparative Studies in Society and History, Vol. 7, No. 3. (Apr., 1965), pp. 267–288.
- R. O. Collins and J. M. Burns. A History of Sub-Saharan Africa, Cambridge, 2007.
- Harrington, Jack (2010), Sir John Malcolm and the Creation of British India, Chs. 4 & 5., New York: Palgrave Macmillan., ISBN 978-0-230-10885-1

=== Period writings ===
- Harold Nicolson. The Colonial Problem. International Affairs, Vol. 17, No. 1. (Jan. - Feb., 1938), pp. 32–50.
- W. E. Rappard . The Practical Working of the Mandates System. Journal of the British Institute of International Affairs, Vol. 4, No. 5. (Sep., 1925), pp. 205–226.
- Jan Smuts. Native Policy in Africa. Journal of the Royal African Society, Vol. 29, No. 115. (Apr., 1930), pp. 248–268.
- Ralph J. Bunche . French and British Imperialism in West Africa. The Journal of Negro History, Vol. 21, No. 1. (Jan., 1936), pp. 31–46.
- F. D. Lugard. The Dual Mandate In British Tropical Africa. Edinburgh: W. Blackwood and sons, 1922.
