= List of museums in Burkina Faso =

This is a list of museums in Burkina Faso.

== List ==
- Manéga Bendrologie Museum
- Music Museum
- National Museum
- Houet Provincial Museum
- Poni Provincial Museum
- Warba Museum

== See also ==
- List of museums
