= Moro Naba Kougri =

36th king of the Ouagadougou Mossi kingdom

Naba Kougri (born Moussa Congo) (1914 – 8 December 1982) was, according to the traditional order, the 36th Mogho Naba of Ouagadougou, the king of the Mossi people of Burkina Faso. He was the son of the previous Mogho Naba, Sagha II. He reigned from 1957 to his death on 8 December 1982.

== Biography ==
After the death of Moro Naba Sagha II on 12 November 1957, his son Moussa Congo, aged 43, succeeded him on November 28, 1957, under the name of Naba Kougri.

=== Attempted coup ===
After the people of Upper Volta had approved the constitution of the French Community on 28 September 1958, and therefore reinforced their state's autonomy, the territorial assembly met on 17 October to designate Ouezzin Coulibaly's successor. On that day, Mogho Naba Kougri made an unsuccessful attempt to install a constitutional monarchy. Kougri, who had the support of Colonel Chevreau, the commander of the French Army in Upper Volta, gathered around 3,000 of his supporters around the assembly and attempted to influence the choice of the new president of the council. Maurice Yaméogo's quick response to the demonstration played in his favour during the rescheduled vote of the assembly on the 20 October, at which he was elected as president of the council.

=== Death ===
Kougri died on 8 December 1982. Police subsequently closed the central market in Ouagadougou to prevent episodes of looting and disorder which had occurred upon the death of his father. His funeral was attended by President Jean-Baptiste Ouédraogo and several government ministers who placed a wreath on his coffin.
