= Musée de Manega =

Museum in Manega, Burkina Faso

Coordinates: 12°54′36″N 1°41′42″W

- Location: Manega, Burkina Faso
- Founder: Frédéric Pacéré Titinga

Musée de Manega or Manega Museum is a museum located 55 km (34 mi) northwest of the city Ouagadougou, in the village of Manega, Burkina Faso. It was established by Frédéric Pacéré Titinga.

The museums contains the "Boura flutes," around 40 funeral pieces, tubes, terracota jars, bracelets and elements that were used for rituals in the Niger Valley, dating from the 2nd to the 11th century. It is also known for its 200-year-old Mossi rifles.

== See also ==
- List of museums in Burkina Faso
