= Titinga Frédéric Pacéré =

Burkinabé writer and historian (1943–2024)

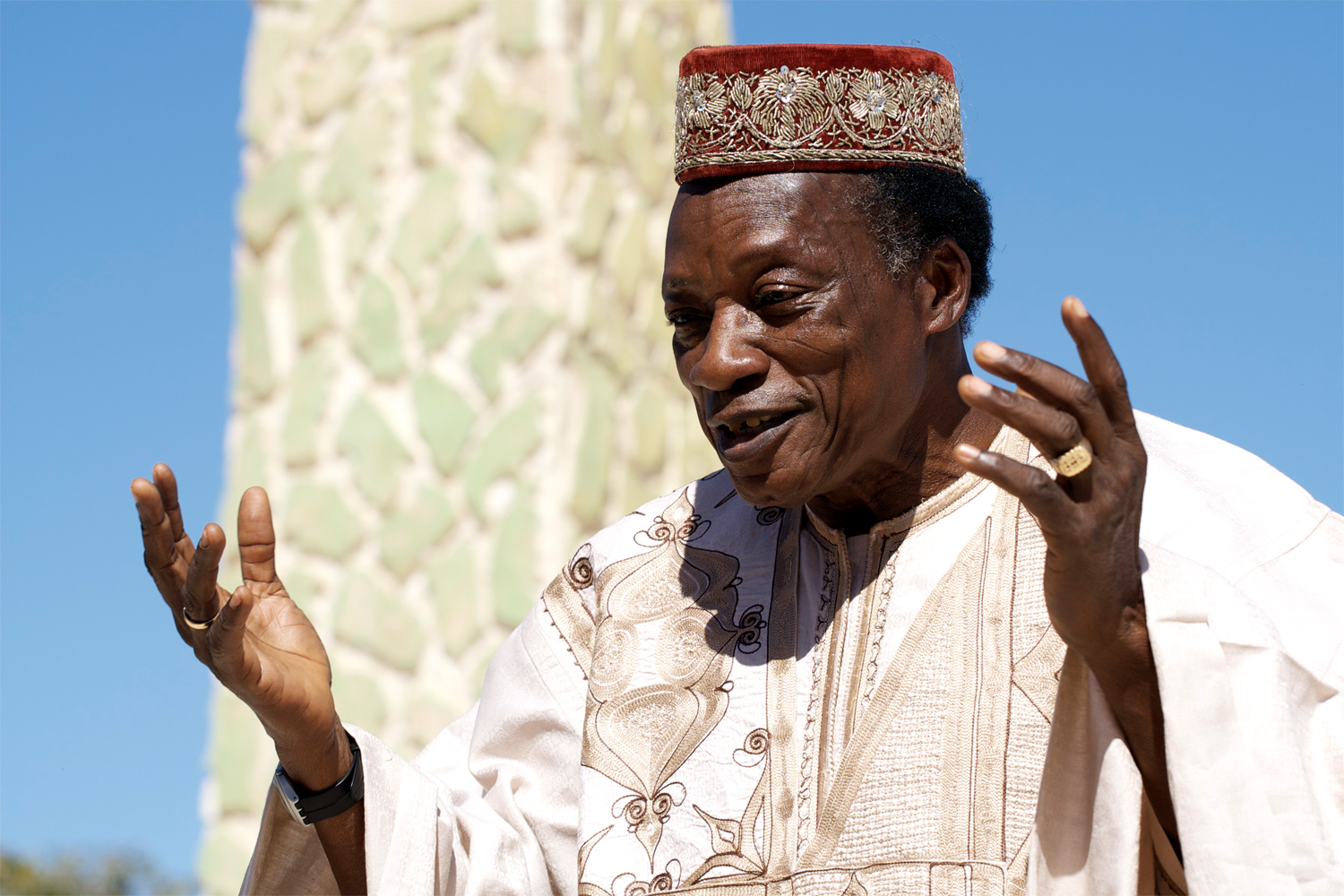
Titinga Frédéric Pacéré at the Musée de Manega

Titinga Frédéric Pacéré (31 December 1943 – 8 November 2024) was a Burkinabé solicitor, writer, poet and griot and founder and curator of the Musée de Manega museum in Burkina Faso.

== Biography ==
Pacéré was born on 31 December 1943. He studied in Abidjan. He wrote over twenty books and published 60 volumes and was awarded the medal of honour of the Association of French speaking writers (A.D.E.L.F.).

He was awarded the 1982 Grand Prix Littéraire d'Afrique Noire for two of his works, Poèmes pour l'Angola (1982) and La Poésie des griots (1982). Other works include Refrains sous le Sahel (1976), Quand s'envolent les grues couronnées (1976), and Du lait pour une tombe (1984).

Pacéré died on 8 November 2024, at the age of 80.

== Works ==
=== Literature ===
- Ça tire sous le Sahel 1976
- Refrains sous le Sahel 1976
- Quand s'envolent les grues couronnées 1976
- La poésie des griots 1983
- Poème pour l'Angola 1983
- Poème pour Koryo 1986
- Livre, culture et développement 1989
- Des entrailles de la terre 1990
- Dim-Dolobsom
- La Bendrologie ou la science du langage tambouriné
- Bendr'N Gomdé
- Le langage des tam-tams et des masques en Afrique 1992
- Saglego, la poésie du tam-tam 1994

=== Essays and art related publications ===
- Problématique de l'aide aux pays sous-développés 1976
- Ainsi on a assassiné tous les Mossé 1979
- L'artisan du Burkina 1987
- Les Yakouga ou pierre tombales du Burkina 1993

=== Sociology and laws ===
- La famille voltaïque en crise 1976
- L'avortement et la loi 1983
- Les enfants abandonnés 1990
- Les personnes handicapées 1990

== Ainsi on a assassiné tous les Mossé ==
The English translation of the book's title is So they murdered all Mossi people. It was first edited in 1979 by Naaman Editions (Canada) and re-edited in 1994 by Edition Fondation Pacere.

This essay describes the "anti-history" principle, one of the main ones guiding the design of Mossi people's society and the destruction of their civilization along with colonization.

Simply stated, anti-history consists of acknowledging that human societies' goal is to make people live happily. When a society can use acquired resources to perpetuate a steady state of fulfillment, it must stop trying to get more (because that would result in disequilibrium) and perpetuate the means and forces that maintain that society in that steady state. Then, the society will have to work against changes and against time to maintain the equilibrium over generations: That is the origin of the term "anti-history".

Anti-history and equilibrium are the very core principles of the Mossi civilization which as said in Ainsi on a assassiné tous les Mossé no longer effectively exists.

== Relevant publications ==
- Kaboré, André. "Orature as a Characteristic of the Literatures of Werewere-Liking and Pacéré." International Journal on Studies in English Language and Literature (IJSELL) 2, no. 4 (2014): 13-30.
