= Naaba Koom II =

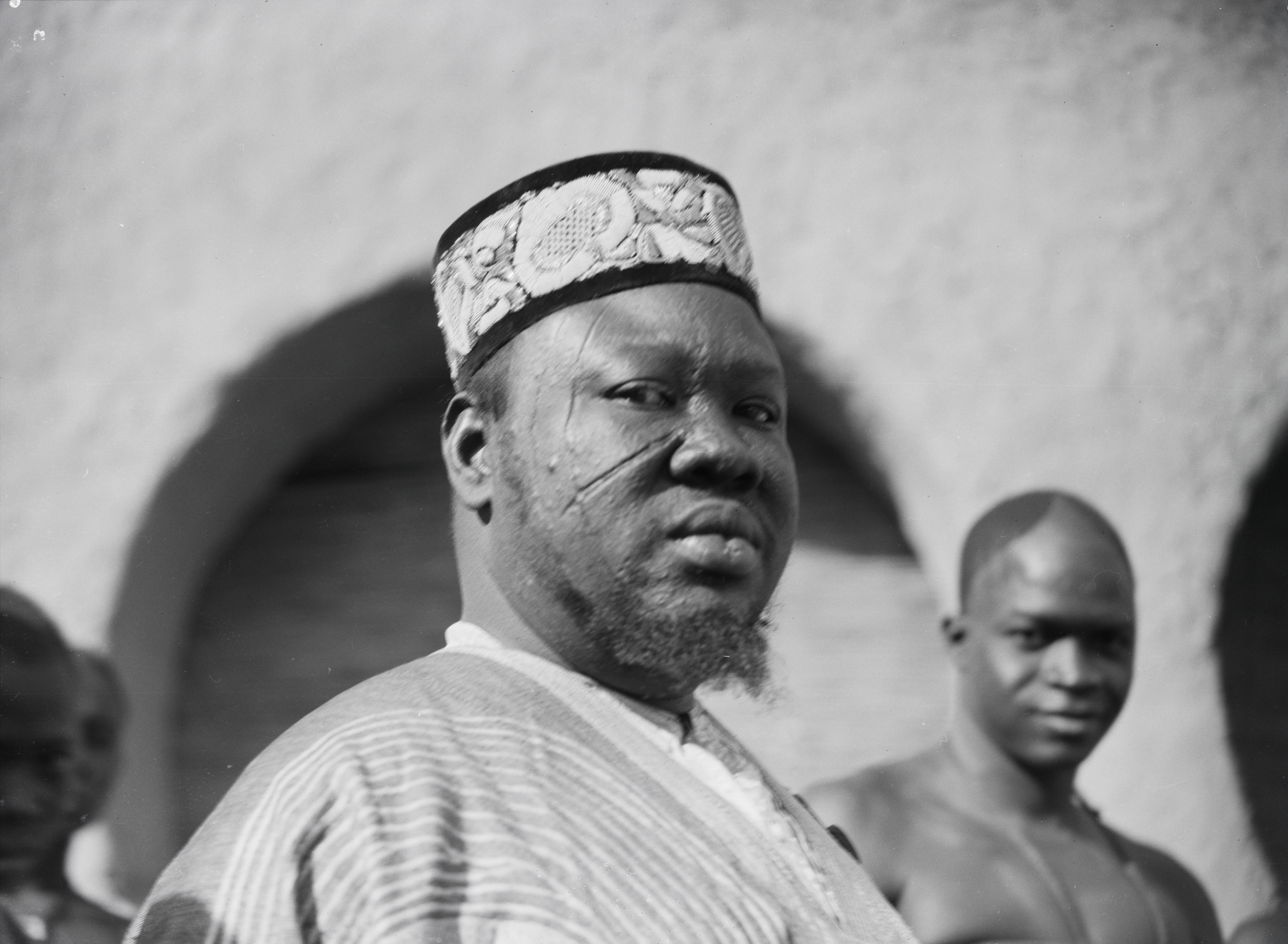
Portrait of Naaba Koom II taken by a Swiss photographer in 1930

Naaba Koom II (1889–1942) was emperor (Mogho Naba) of the Mossi state of Wogodogo in French West Africa from 27 February 1905 to his death on 12 March 1942. He succeeded 11 days upon the death of Naaba Sigiri in 1905. He was succeeded by Naaba Saaga II.

At the time of his death, it was rumoured in Free French circles that Naaba Koom's death was the result of a suicide in protest at continued Vichy rule in French West Africa. This is thought by modern historians to be factually untrue.
