= National Museum of Music (Burkina Faso) =

Museum in Ouagadougou, Burkina Faso

Coordinates: 12°22′25″N 1°31′01″W

This is an article for a museum in Burkina Faso. For the museum in the USA, see National Music Museum.

The National Museum of Music (French: Musée de la Musique), officially the Georges Ouédraogo Museum of Music (Musée de la Musique "Georges-Ouédraogo"), is in Ouagadougou, (Burkina Faso) in a two-story building on Oubritenga Avenue on the south side of the Phillipe Zinda Kabore School.

The building that once housed the Association for the Development of African Architecture and Urban Planning (ADAUA) was renovated to accommodate the museum. The building is in Sudanese Sahelian style with dome-shaped roofs. It is in the centre of the city and is easily accessible to the general public.

The first collection, put together between September 1998 and March 1999, is constantly growing. Instruments from all families are represented including aerophones, membranophones, idiophones and chordophones. Each object is the only one of its kind and varies from 5 to 200 years in age.

The museum is headed by the curator, Parfait Z. Bambara

== See also ==
- List of music museums
