= Moro-Naba Ceremony =

Weekly ceremony in Ouagadougou, Burkina Faso

The Moro-Naba Ceremony takes place every Friday around 07:00 in Ouagadougou, the capital of Burkina Faso.

Mossi leaders travel to the compound of the Moro-Naba chief. They are seated by rank for the Moro-Naba's appearance. The Moro-Naba wears red and appears with a horse as if prepared for war. A cannon fires, the most senior chiefs pledge allegiance, and the Moro-Naba leaves before reappearing in white, as if making peace. Doolo, the traditional beer, and kola nut drinks are distributed, after which the Moro-Naba holds court.

The ceremony is said to represent the Moro-Naba's ministers dissuading him from going to war.
