= List of rulers of Wogodogo =

The mogho naba (Note: Also spelled moro naba, morho naba, mogh-naba or moogo naaba, it combines the words for head (naba) of the world (moro).) of Wogodogo is the ruler ("king of the world") of Wogodogo, one of the Mossi Kingdoms located in present-day Burkina Faso. The kingdom takes its name from its historic capital, now the Burkinabe national capital of Ouagadougou. Although the most politically powerful of the Mossi Kingdoms, there was no Mossi "empire", and the Wogodogo king did not have authority over the other kingdoms. The French colonial period and subsequent independence have reduced the power vested in the position, but the mogho naba retains an influential role in Burkina Faso. The position is typically hereditary, following male-only lines of descent. Originally, the position passed primarily to brothers (or even cousins), rather than to sons, but by the reign of Zombré had transitioned to its current order of succession, where rule generally passes to the eldest living son of the previous ruler. Children born to sons who predecease their fathers are not eligible to inherit the title. However, a tribal council is ultimately responsible for selecting the mogho naba, and the heir apparent may be passed over if, for example, he is deemed physically unfit for the position's traditional role in war or if he would fail to uphold the dignity of the office (as in cases of adultery). This council has traditionally included: the baloum naba, head of the king's servants; the gounga naba, leader of the infantry; the larale naba, keeper of the royal tombs; the kamsaogo naba, manager of the palace eunuchs; and the widi naba, the royal groom.

== Rulers of Wogodogo ==
The chronology of the Mossi Kingdoms prior to the French occupation is unclear. Historian Yamba Tiendrebeogo reconstructed the history of Wogodogo from Mossi oral tradition that included the lengths of the reigns of historical rulers. Other scholars propose more recent dates for many pre-colonial events—setting the start of Oubri's reign around 1495 rather than 1182—and correspondingly shorter reigns for many rulers.

=== As mogho naba of Tenkodogo ===
The first Mossi Kingdom was centered around Tenkodogo. Wogodogo, initially a client state of Tenkodogo, gradually grew in power until it was the dominant political power in the Mossi Kingdoms; nevertheless, the rulers of Tenkodogo prior to the formation of Wogodogo are counted as kings of Wogodogo by tradition.

No.	Ruler	Rule began	Rule ended	Notes	Ref(s)
1	Ouedraogo		1132		
2	Zoungrana	1132	1182		

=== As mogho naba of Oubritenga ===
The first capital of Oubritenga ("Oubri's land") was Guilongou, near modern-day Ziniaré, but typically moved to a village preferred by each new king upon his accession.

No.	Ruler	Rule began	Rule ended	Notes	Ref(s)
3	Oubri	1182	1244		
4	Naskiemdé	1244	1286		
5	Nasbiré	1286	1307		
6	Soarba	1307	1323		
7	Gnignemdo	1323	1337		
8	Koundoumié	1337	1358		
9	Kouda	1358	1401		
10	Dawingna	1401	1409		
11	Zoétré Bousma	1409	1441		
12	Niandfo	1441	1511		
13	Nakienb-Zanga	1511	1541	Also known as Nakim	
14	Namégué	1541	1542		
15	Kiba	1542	1561		
16	Kimba	1561	1582		
17	Goabga	1582	1599		
18	Guirga	1599	1605		
19	Zanna	1605	1633		
20	Oubi	1633	1659		
21	Motiba	1659	1666		
22	Warga	1666	1681		

=== As mogho naba of Wogodogo ===
Naba Zombré relocated the capital to Wogodogo (Ouagadougou).

No.	Ruler	Rule began	Rule ended	Notes	Ref(s)
23	Zombré	1681	1744		
24	Saga I	1744	1762		
25	Kom I	1762	1783		
26	Doulougou	1783	1802		
27	Sawadogo	1802	1834		
28	Karfo	1834	1842		
29	Baongo I	1842	1850		
30	Koutou	1850	1871		
31	Sanem	1871	1889		
32	Wobgho	1889	21 January 1897	Also known as Boukari Koutou	
33	Siguiri	28 January 1897	16 February 1905		
34	Kom II	27 February 1905	12 February 1942		
35	Saga II	23 March 1942	12 November 1957		
36	Kougri	28 November 1957	8 December 1982		
37	Baongo II	December 1982	present		

== Scope of power ==
According to Titinga Frédéric Pacéré, in tradition, he has authority with right of matters of life and death on the inhabitants of Wogodogo and Oubritenga. In practice, his power was subject to the custom and law of the fathers. He personifies the empire and embodies its unity, but power is really in the hands of the court of the mogho naba, ministers who make decisions and govern the country. This complex organisation of powers is materialised every Friday during the ceremony of the false departure of the king.

The mogho naba has no authority over the other kingdoms of Tenkodogo, Fada N'Gourma, Boussouma and Ouahigouya, whose sovereigns would be, like him, descendants of Yennenga. Traditionally, the rulers of these four kingdoms and the mogho naba avoid each other, but they happen to meet, such as happened in 1946 to consult on the reconstruction of the Upper Volta.

== Bibliography ==
- Englebert, Pierre (1996). Burkina Faso: Unsteady Statehood in West Africa. Routledge. ISBN 978-0-8133-3680-0.
- Levtzion, Nehemia (1975). "North-West Africa: from the Maghrib to the fringes of the forest". In Gray, Richard (ed.). The Cambridge History of Africa, Volume 4: from c. 1600 to c. 1790. Cambridge University Press. pp. 142–222. ISBN 978-0-521-20413-2.
- Ouedraogo, Mahamoudou (2000). Culture et Dévelopment en Afrique: Le Temps du Repositionnement (in French). L'Harmattan. ISBN 978-2-7384-9805-2.
- Rupley, Lawrence; Bangali, Lamissa; Diamitani, Boureima (2013). Historical Dictionary of Burkina Faso (Third ed.). Scarecrow Press. ISBN 978-0-8108-6770-3.
- Skinner, Elliott P. (1970). "The Changing Status of the "Emperor of the Mossi" under Colonial Rule and Since Independence". In Crowder, Michael; Ikime, Obaro (eds.). West African Chiefs: Their changing status under colonial rule and independence. New York: Africana Pub. Corp. pp. 98–123. ISBN 978-0-8419-0046-2.
