= Ouagadougou =

Capital of Burkina Faso

Ouagadougou: Waogdgo (Mossi); Wagadugu (Dyula); Ouagadougou (French)
- Capital city
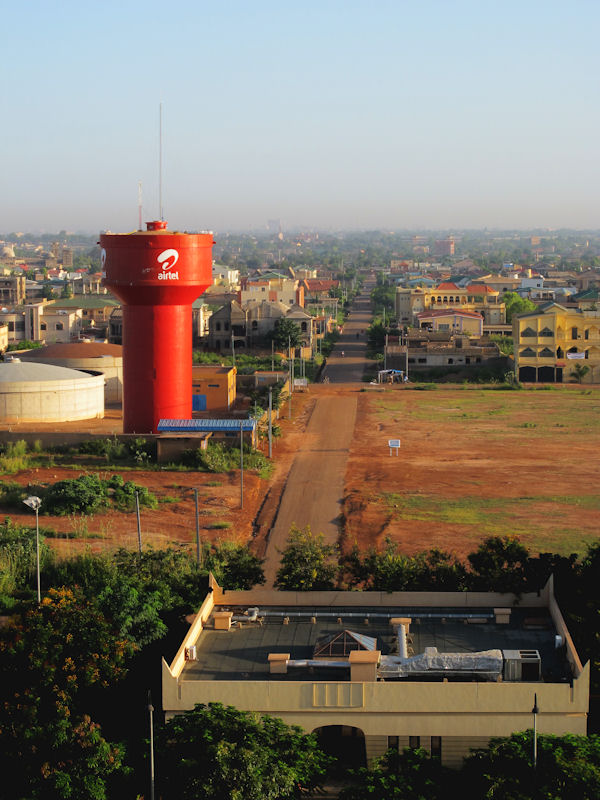
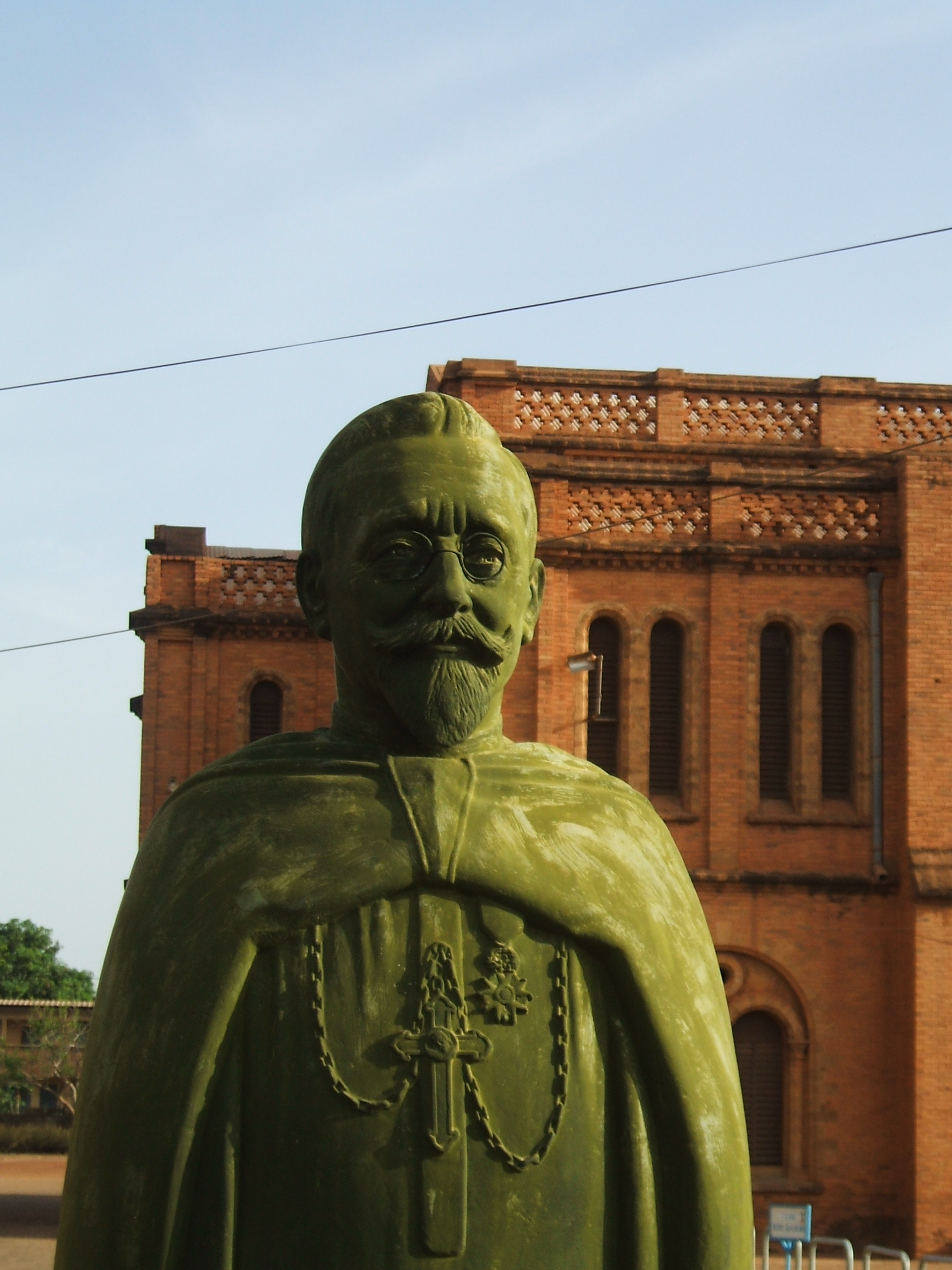
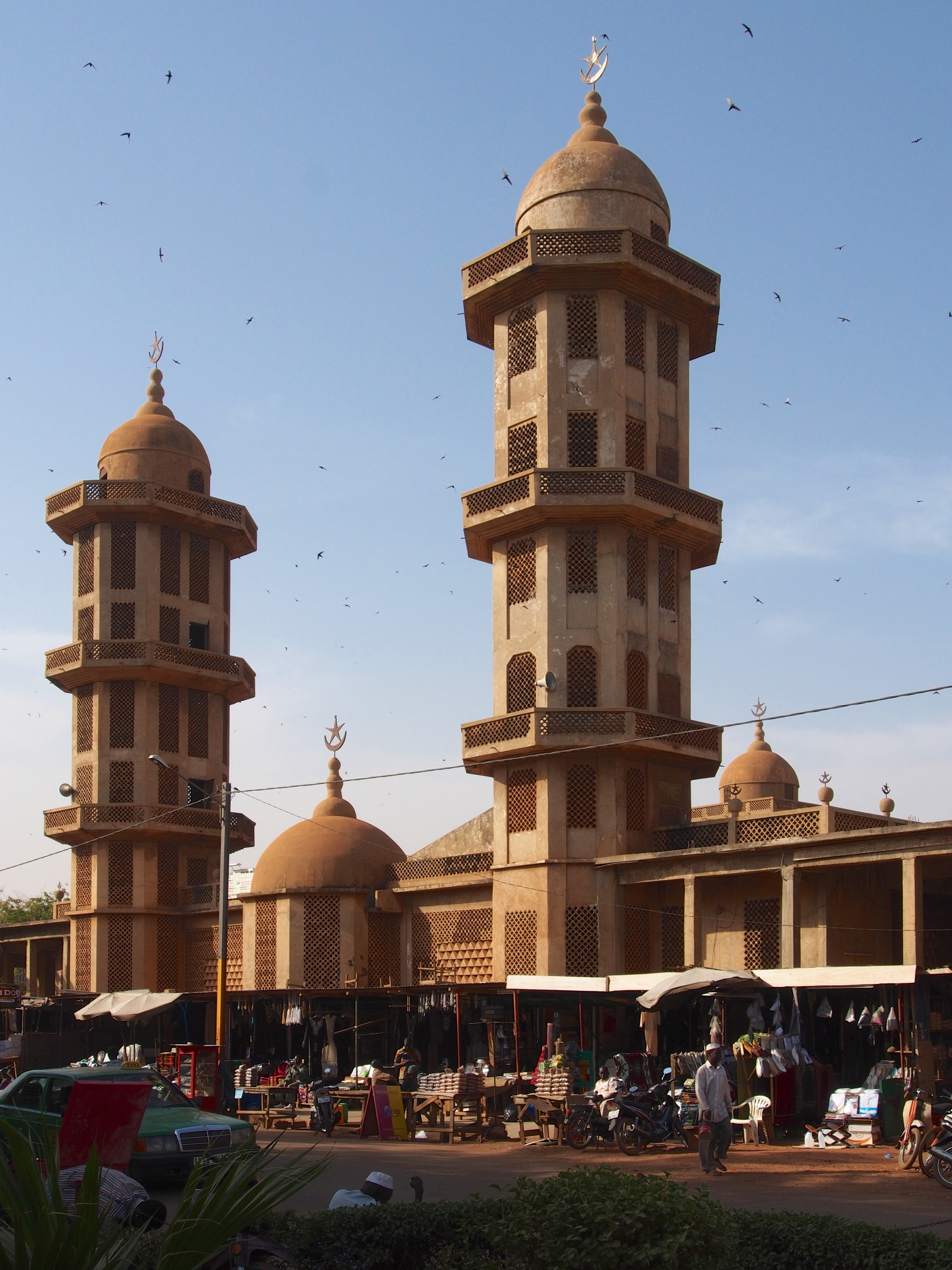
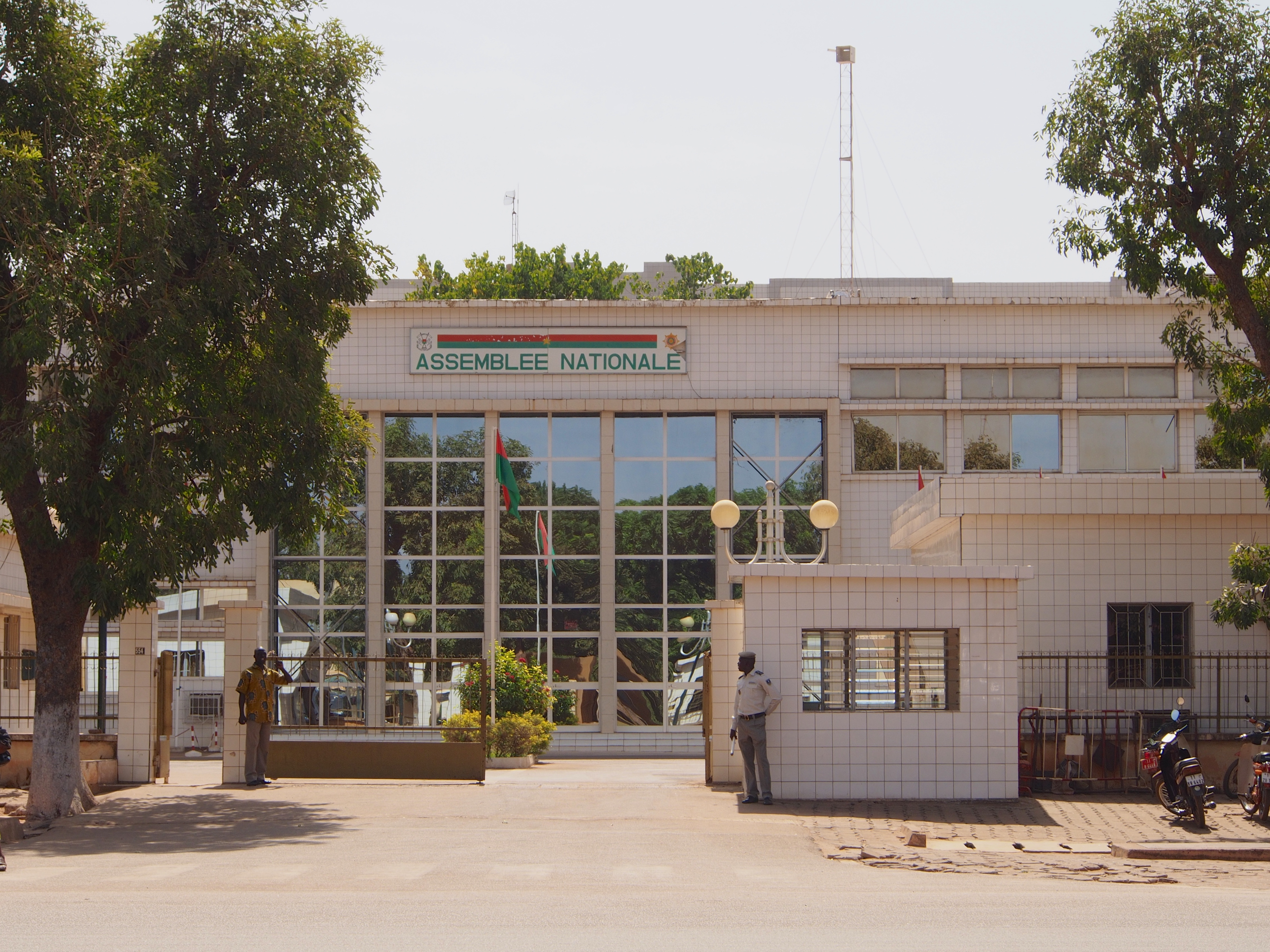
- From top: Ouagadougou skyline, statue of Joanny Thévenoud in front of Ouagadougou Cathedral, Grand Mosque, National Assembly of Burkina Faso, Hall of Martyrs (formerly the Memorial to National Heroes)

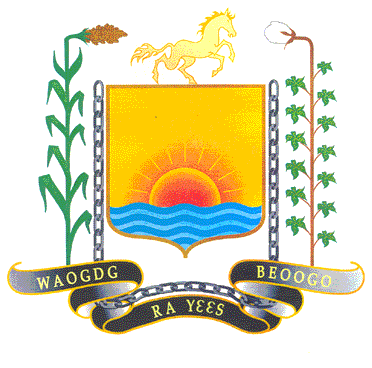
- Coat of arms
- Nickname: Ouaga
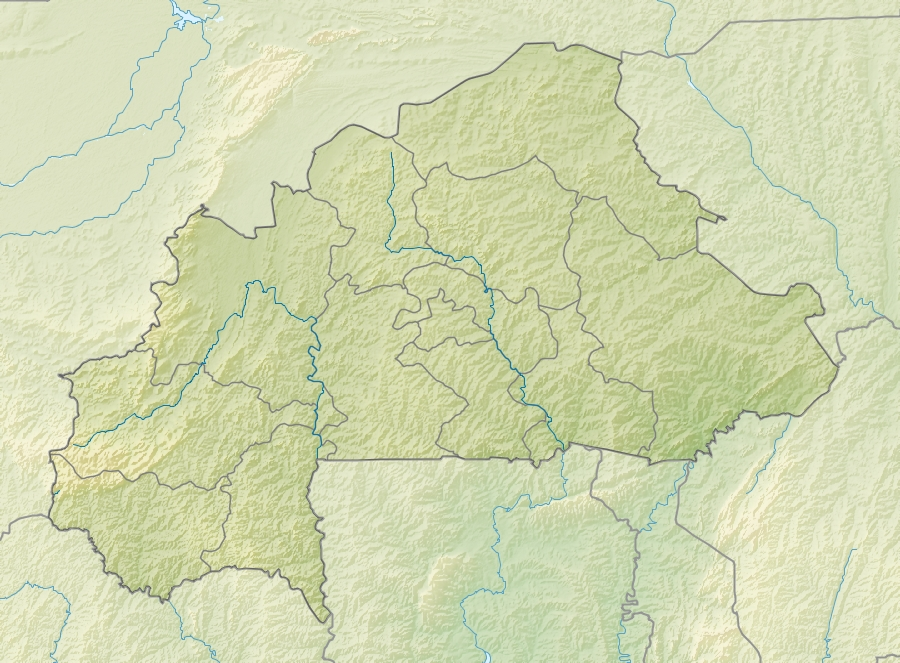
- Location within Burkina Faso Location within Africa
- Coordinates: 12°22′07″N 01°31′39″W
- Country: Burkina Faso
- Regions: Kadiogo
- Province: Kadiogo
- Department: Ouagadougou Department
- Founded: 1050

Area
  - Capital city: 520 km^{2} (200 sq mi)
  - Metro: 2,805 km^{2} (1,083 sq mi)
- Elevation: 305 m (1,001 ft)

Population (2019)
  - Capital city: 2,415,266
  - Rank: 1st
  - Density: 4,600/km^{2} (12,000/sq mi)
  - Urban: 3,063,271
  - Metro: 3,358,934
  - Metro density: 1,197/km^{2} (3,101/sq mi)
- Time zone: UTC+00:00 (GMT)
- Area code: +226
- Climate: Aw
- Website: www.mairie-ouaga.bf

Ouagadougou or Wagadugu (/ˌwɑːɡəˈduːɡuː/; Mossi: Waogdgo, pronounced [ˈwɔɣədəɣʊ]; Dyula: Wagadugu; French: Ouagadougou, pronounced [waɡaduɡu]) is the capital and largest city of Burkina Faso, and the administrative, communications, cultural and economic centre of the nation. It had a population of 2,415,266 in 2019. The city's name is often shortened to Ouaga. The inhabitants are called ouagalais. The spelling of the name Ouagadougou is derived from the French orthography common in former French African colonies.

Ouagadougou's primary industries are food processing and textiles. It is served by an international airport and is linked by rail to Abidjan in the Ivory Coast and, for freight only, to Kaya. There are several highways linking the city to Niamey, Niger, south to Ghana, and southwest to Ivory Coast. Ouagadougou has one of West Africa's largest markets, which burned down in 2003 and has since reopened with better facilities and improved fire-prevention measures. Other attractions include the National Museum of Burkina Faso, the Moro-Naba Palace (site of the Moro-Naba Ceremony), the National Museum of Music, and several craft markets.

== History ==
=== Foundation and regional importance ===
Ouagadougou was founded possibly as early as 1050 by the Soninke Wangara diaspora from the Ghana Empire, also known as Wagadu. The name Wagadugu means 'home of the Wagu', the Soninke subgroup that ruled Ghana. Ouagadougou is a Francophone spelling of this name.

The Mossi people, moving north in the 14th century, conquered Wagadugu around the same time they raided Walata, contributing to the decline of the Mali Empire. According to legend, the city was taken by Oubri, a grandson of Ouedraogo.

The eponymous Wagadugu Kingdom was founded in the 15th century, which became the main center of the Mossi States around 1495. The 10th Moro Naba, Nyadfo, was the first Moro-Naba to live at Ouagadougou, in the middle of the 17th century. It became the permanent capital under the 21st Moro Naba, Zombre, a century later. The Moro-Naba Ceremony is still performed every Friday by the Moro-Naba and his court. The 24th Moro Naba, Doulougou, built the first mosque in Ouagadougou early in the nineteenth century.

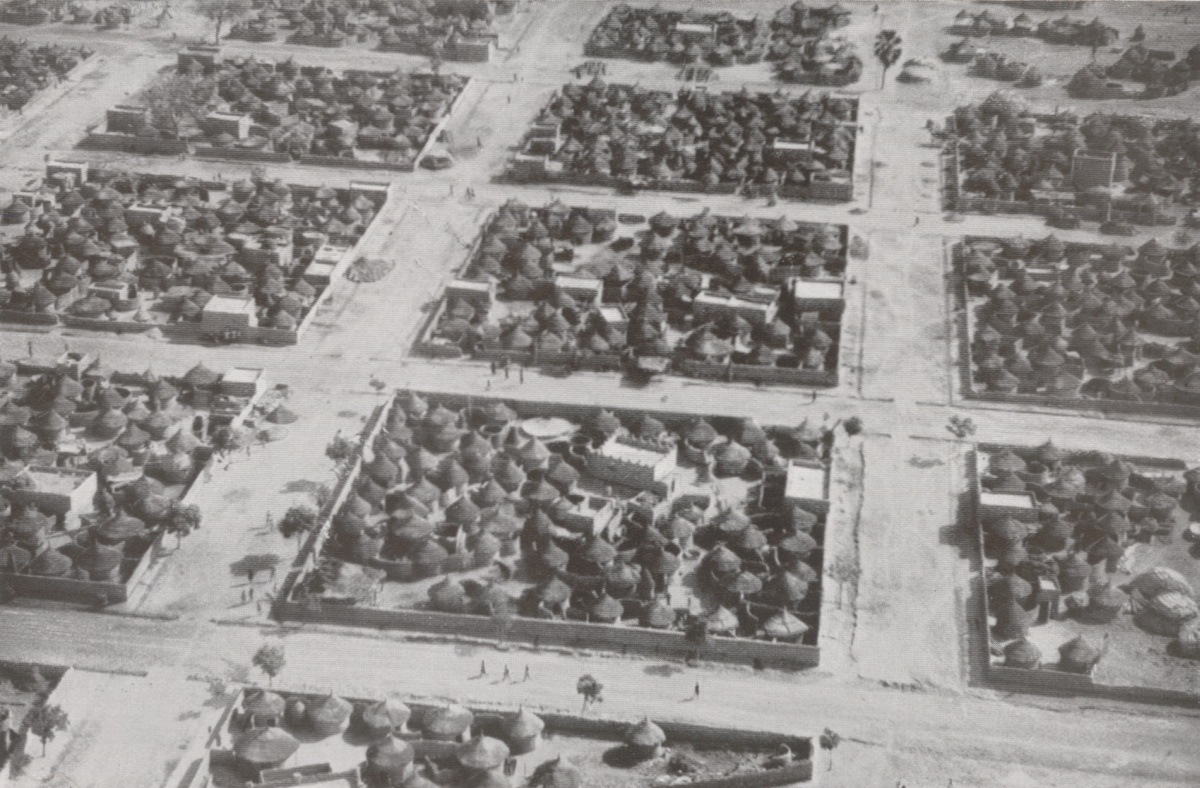
Ouagadougou in 1930

=== Colonialism ===
On 5 September 1896 French forces entered Ouagadougou and burned the city to the ground. In 1919 the colonial administration made Ouagadougou the capital of the Upper Volta territory, extensively rebuilding the town. In 1954 the railroad line from Ivory Coast reached the city, spurring massive population growth.

=== Independence ===
On 15 January 2016, gunmen armed with heavy weapons attacked central Ouagadougou at the Cappuccino restaurant and the Splendid Hotel. 28 people were killed, and at least 56 wounded; after a government counterattack, a total of 176 hostages were released the morning after the initial attack. Three of the perpetrators were also killed. The jihadist insurgency continued with major attacks in 2017 and 2018.

== Climate ==
Ouagadougou's climate is hot semi-arid (BSh) under Köppen-Geiger classification, and closely borders with tropical wet and dry (Aw). The city is part of the Sudano-Sahelian area, with annual rainfall of about 800 mm (31 in). The rainy season stretches from May to September, with an average temperature of 28 °C (82.4 °F). The cool season runs from October to February, with a minimum average temperature of 16 °C (60.8 °F). The maximum temperature during the hot season, which runs from March to April, can reach 43 °C (109.4 °F). The harmattan (a dry wind) and the West African Monsoon are the two main factors that determine Ouagadougou's climate. Being further north, Ouagadougou's warmest months are slightly hotter and drier than those of Bobo-Dioulasso, the country's second most populous city.

Climate data for Ouagadougou (1991–2020, extremes 1902–present)
Month	Jan	Feb	Mar	Apr	May	Jun	Jul	Aug	Sep	Oct	Nov	Dec	Year
Record high °C (°F)	39.8 (103.6)	42.3 (108.1)	44.5 (112.1)	46.1 (115.0)	44.5 (112.1)	41.3 (106.3)	38.8 (101.8)	36.6 (97.9)	38.6 (101.5)	41.0 (105.8)	40.5 (104.9)	40.1 (104.2)	46.1 (115.0)
Mean daily maximum °C (°F)	33.5 (92.3)	36.5 (97.7)	39.3 (102.7)	40.0 (104.0)	38.4 (101.1)	35.6 (96.1)	32.9 (91.2)	31.6 (88.9)	33.1 (91.6)	36.0 (96.8)	36.7 (98.1)	34.4 (93.9)	35.7 (96.3)
Daily mean °C (°F)	25.0 (77.0)	28.1 (82.6)	31.7 (89.1)	33.5 (92.3)	32.5 (90.5)	30.1 (86.2)	27.8 (82.0)	26.8 (80.2)	27.7 (81.9)	29.6 (85.3)	28.3 (82.9)	25.7 (78.3)	28.9 (84.0)
Mean daily minimum °C (°F)	17.1 (62.8)	20.0 (68.0)	24.3 (75.7)	27.4 (81.3)	27.1 (80.8)	25.1 (77.2)	23.4 (74.1)	22.9 (73.2)	23.1 (73.6)	23.9 (75.0)	20.4 (68.7)	17.5 (63.5)	22.7 (72.9)
Record low °C (°F)	8.5 (47.3)	10.4 (50.7)	14.8 (58.6)	16.2 (61.2)	17.0 (62.6)	17.0 (62.6)	15.0 (59.0)	17.9 (64.2)	17.6 (63.7)	17.6 (63.7)	13.0 (55.4)	9.5 (49.1)	8.5 (47.3)
Average precipitation mm (inches)	0.1 (0.00)	0.4 (0.02)	4.7 (0.19)	43.8 (1.72)	69.8 (2.75)	83.4 (3.28)	202.4 (7.97)	232.1 (9.14)	142.5 (5.61)	32.0 (1.26)	6.6 (0.26)	0.0 (0.0)	812.8 (32.00)
Average precipitation days (≥ 1.0 mm)	0.0	0.1	0.4	2.2	5.2	7.0	12.3	14.4	10.4	3.6	0.1	0.0	55.7
Average relative humidity (%)	24	21	22	36	50	64	72	80	77	60	38	29	48
Mean monthly sunshine hours	271.1	245.9	245.4	232.2	250.0	235.9	221.8	194.8	218.1	264.9	277.4	283.4	2,940.9
Source 1: World Meteorological Organization, Meteo Climat (record highs and lows)
Source 2: Deutscher Wetterdienst (humidity, 1961–1967)

== Government ==
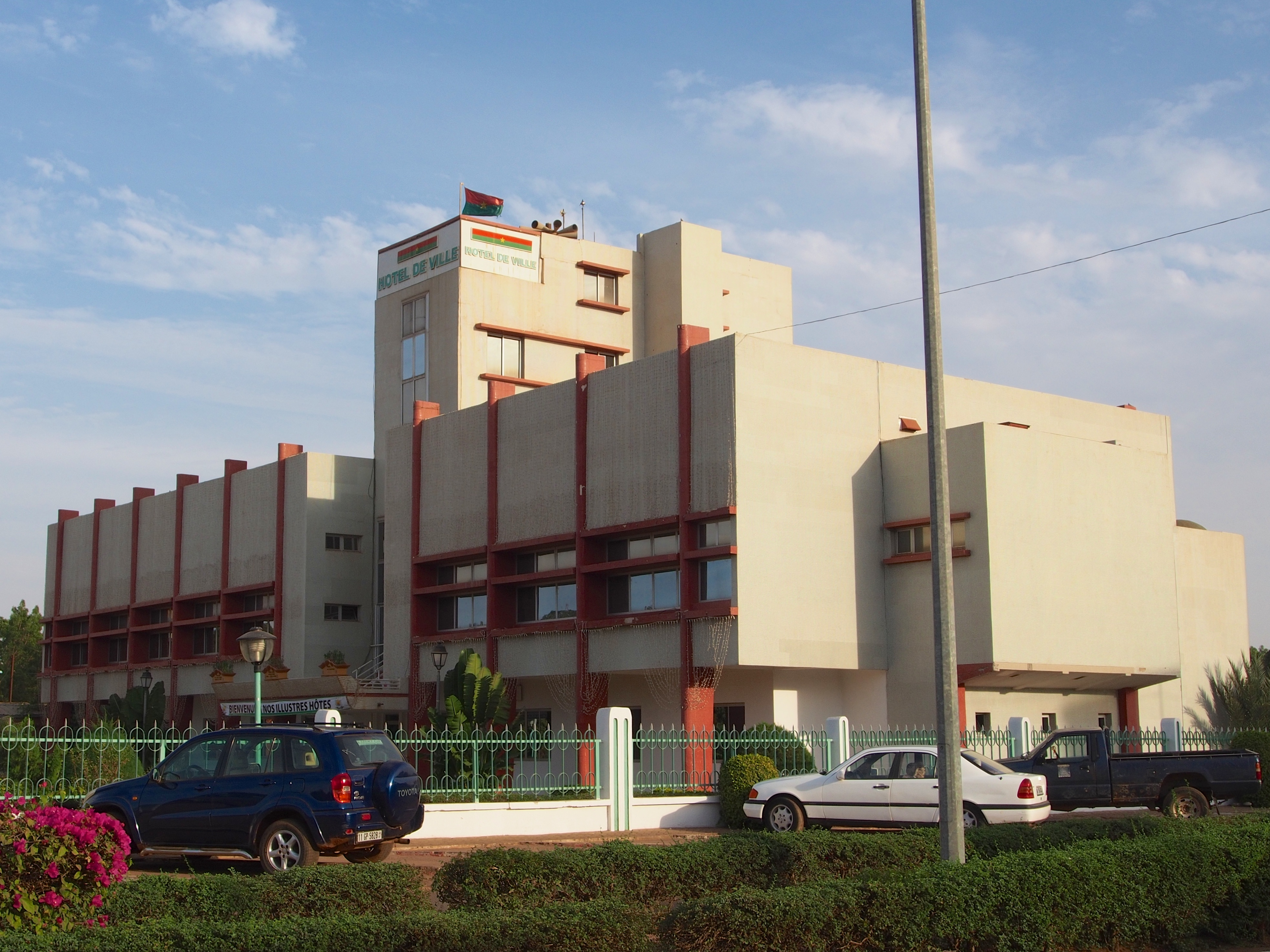
Town hall of Ouagadougou

Ouagadougou's first municipal elections were held in 1956.

The city is divided into five arrondissements, consisting of 30 sectors, which are subdivided into districts. Districts of Ouagadougou include Gounghin, Kamsaoghin, Koulouba, Moemmin, Niogsin, Paspanga, Peuloghin, Bilbalogho, and Tiendpalogo.

Ouagadougou's communes have invested in huge city-management projects. This is largely because Ouagadougou constitutes a 'cultural centre' by merit of holding the SIAO (International Arts and Crafts fair) and the FESPACO (Panafrican Film and Television Festival of Ouagadougou). Moreover, the villages' growing affluence allows for such investment, and the population's rapid growth necessitates it.

The arrondissements of Ouagadougou
Arrondissement	Population (Census 2006)
Baskuy	180,512
Bogodogo	374,473
Boulmiougou	366,182
Nongremassom	188,329
Sig-Noghin	163,859

== Education ==
Though literacy in Ouagadougou is not high, there are three universities in the city. The largest is the state University of Ouagadougou, which was founded in 1974. In 2010 it had around 40,000 students (83% of the national population of university students).

The city's official language is French and the principal local languages are More, Dyula and Fulfulde. The bilingual program in schools (French plus one of the local languages) was established in 1994.

International schools include:

- Lycée Saint-Exupéry de Ouagadougou (French school)
- International School of Ouagadougou

== Sport ==
Stade du 4-Août

Ouagadougou's inhabitants play a wide array of sports, including association football, basketball, and volleyball. There are tournaments and activities organized by the local authorities. The Stade du 4-Août is the home of Étoile Filante de Ouagadougou, the city's main football team.

== Health ==
Ouagadougou has both state and private hospitals. The two state hospitals in the city are the Centre hospitalier national Yalgado Ouedraogo (CHNYO) and the Centre hospitalier national pédiatrique Charles de Gaulle (CHNP-CDG). Despite that, the local population still largely can only afford traditional local medicine and the "pharmacopée".

== Transport ==
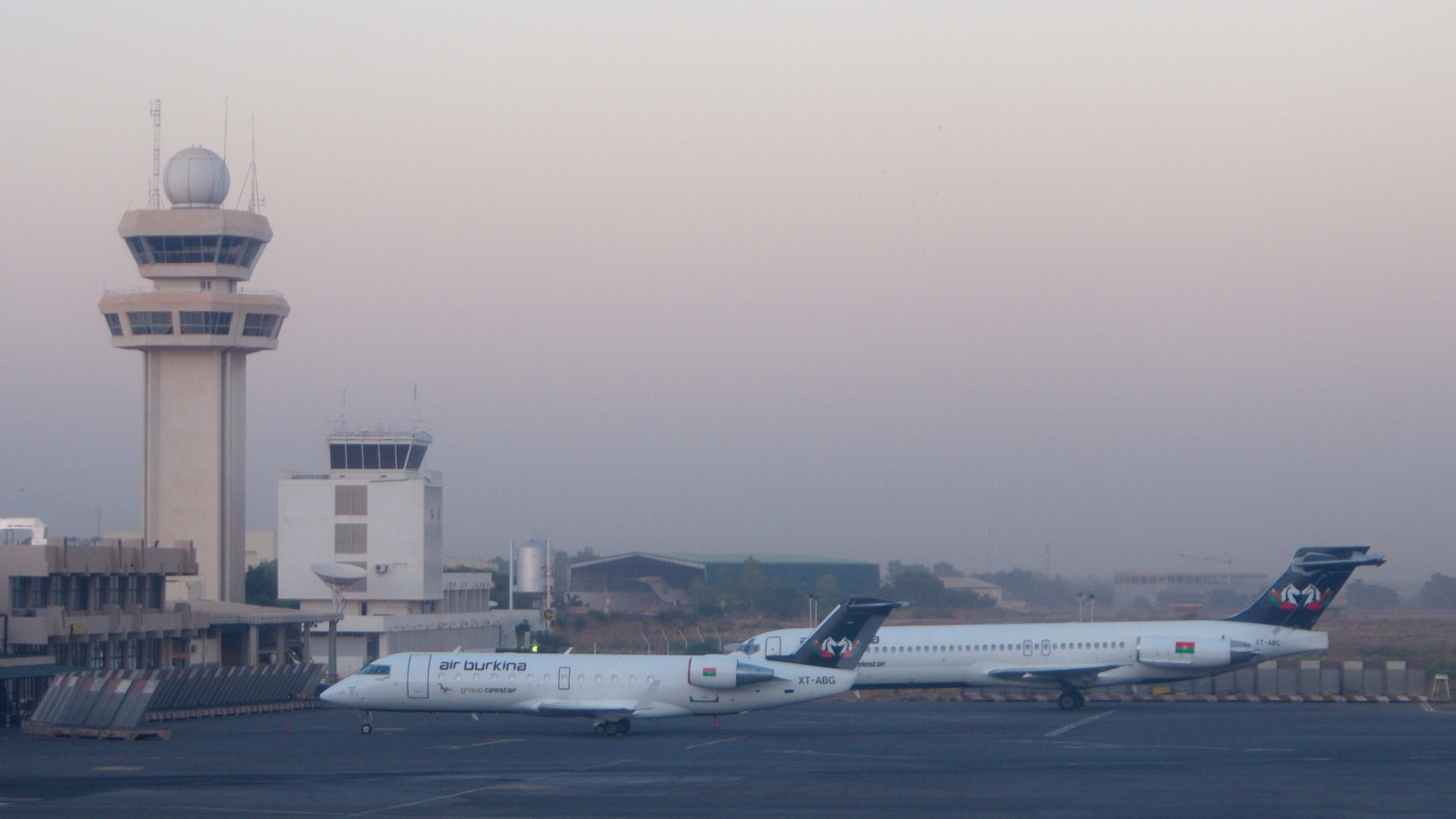
Ouagadougou International Airport

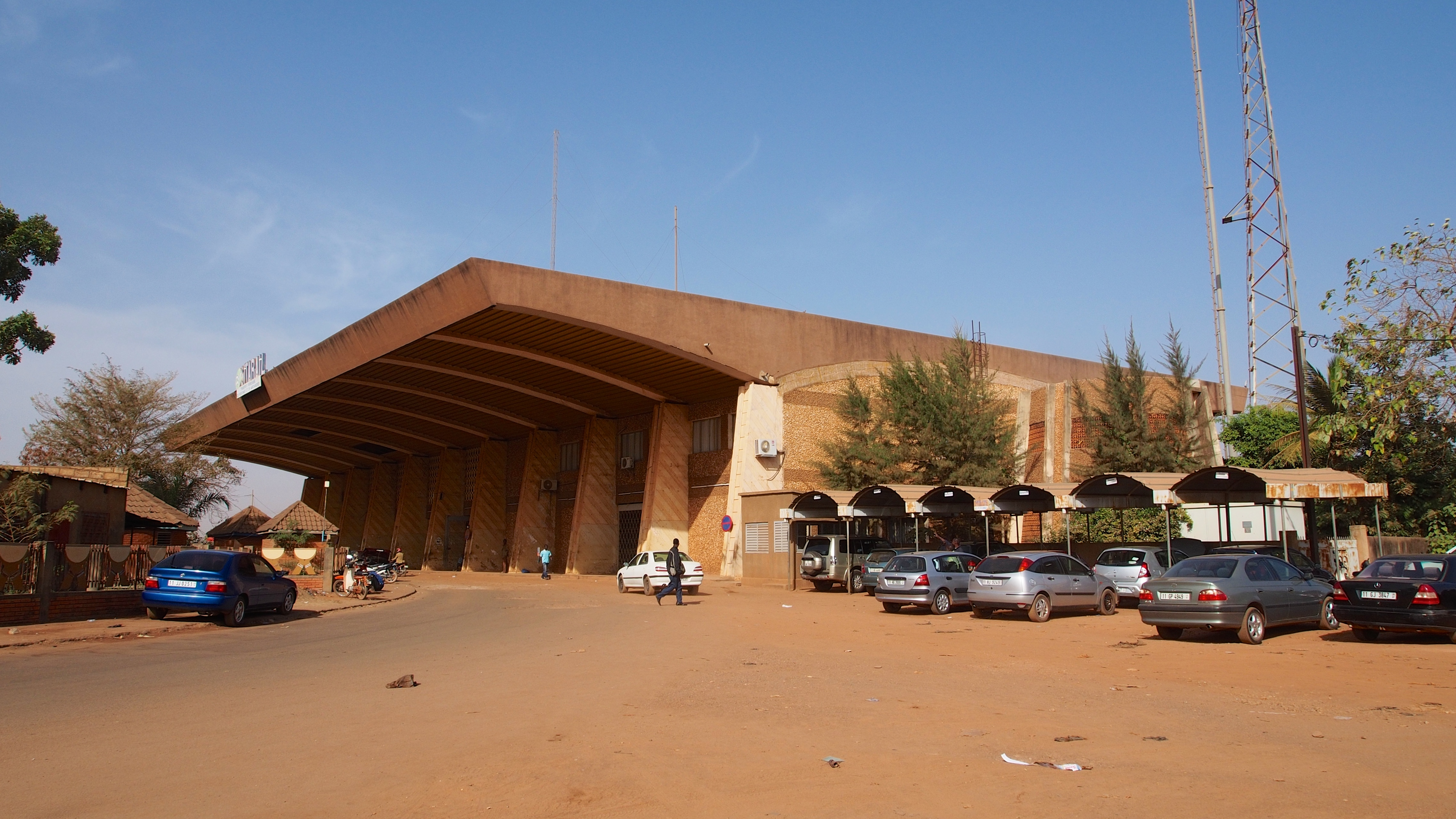
Ouagadougou train station

=== Air transport ===
Thomas Sankara International Airport Ouagadougou (code OUA) serves the area with flights to West Africa and Europe. Air Burkina has its head office in the Air Burkina Storey Building (French: Immeuble Air Burkina) in Ouagadougou.

=== Rail ===
Ouagadougou is connected by passenger rail service to Bobo-Dioulasso, Koudougou and Ivory Coast. As of June 2014, Sitarail operates a passenger train three times a week along the route from Ouagadougou to Abidjan. There are freight services to Kaya in north Burkina Faso and in 2014 plans were announced to revive freight services to the manganese mine at Tambao starting in 2016.

== Economy ==
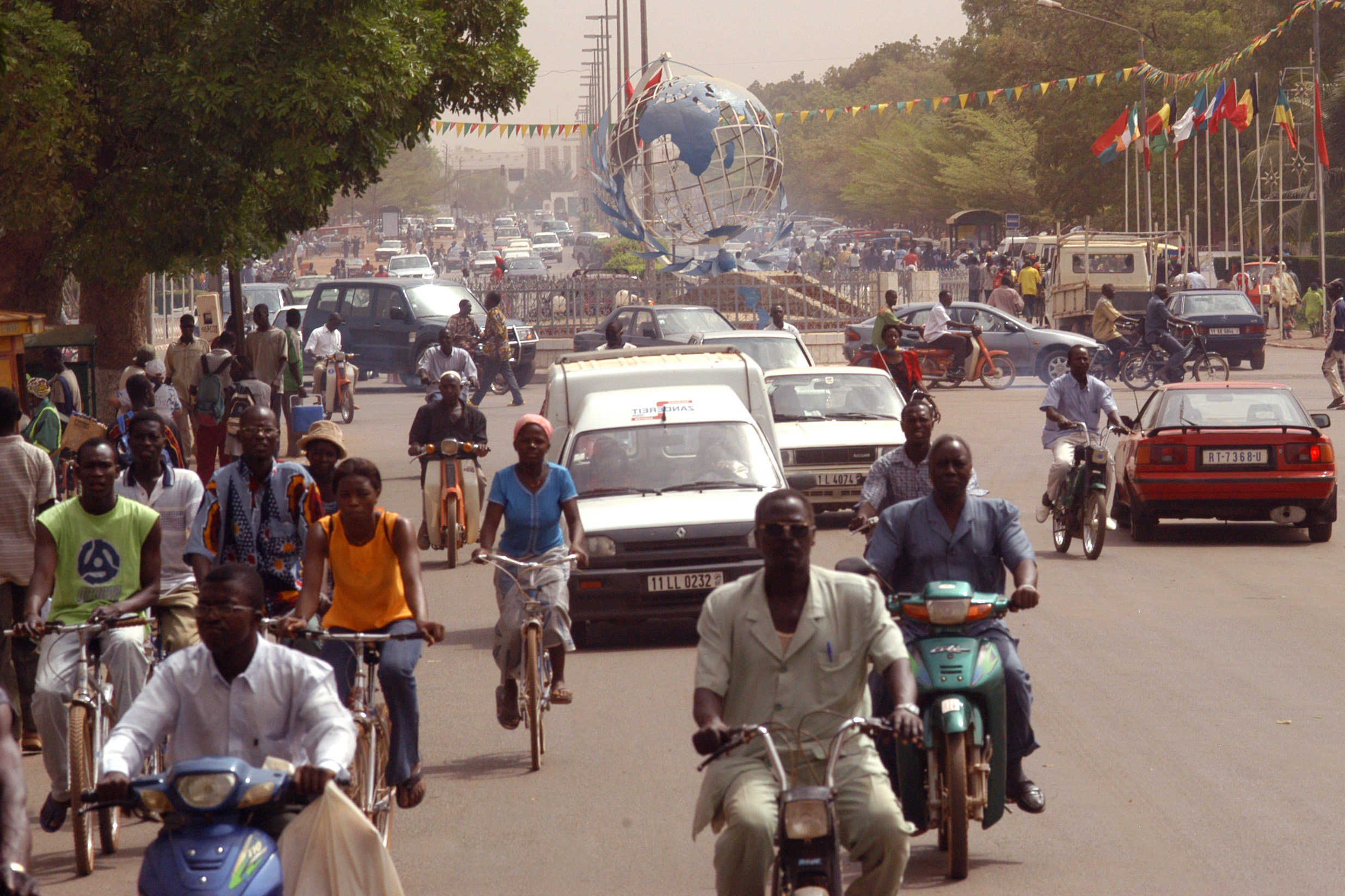
Ouagadougou's busy city centre

The economy of Ouagadougou is based on industry and commerce. Some industrial facilities have relocated from Bobo-Dioulasso to Ouagadougou, which has made the city an important industrial centre of Burkina Faso. The industrial areas of Kossodo and Gounghin are home to several processing plants and factories. The industry of Ouagadougou is the sector that fuels urban growth, as people move to the city from the countryside to find employment in industry. The Copromof workshop in Ouagadougou sews cotton lingerie for the French label "Atelier Augusti."

Ouagadougou is an important commercial centre. It is a centre where goods are collected and directed to rural areas. With a large consumer base, large amounts of energy sources, raw materials for buildings, agricultural products and livestock products are imported to the city.

The economy is dominated by the informal sector, which is characterized by petty commodity production, and workers not necessarily having salaries. Traditional, informal trade is widespread and concentrated around markets and major roads, as well as in outlets in neighborhoods. While the formal economy consists of modern economic practices with workplaces having qualified, stable labor forces, or more traditional forms of business such as family businesses.

Informal trade

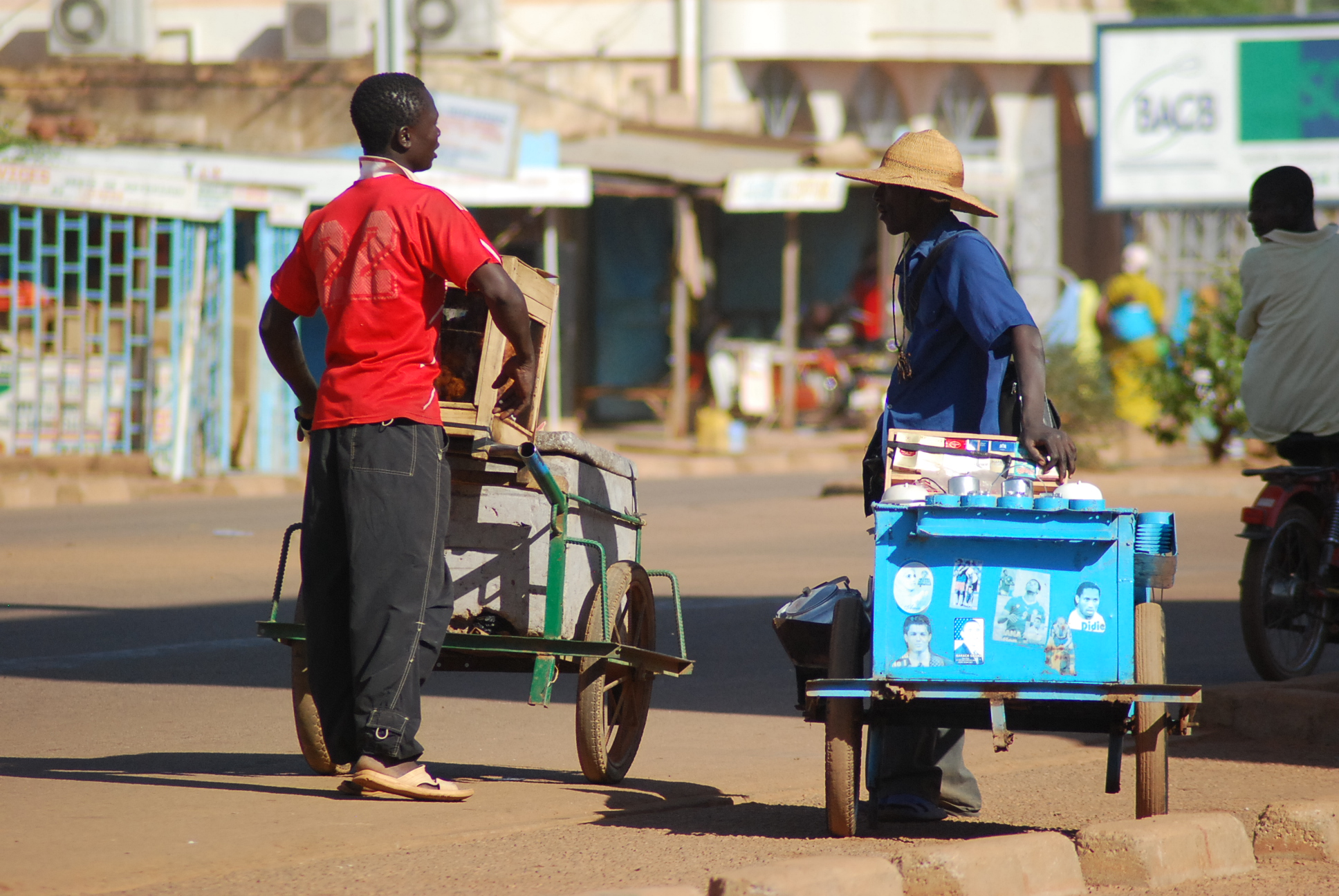

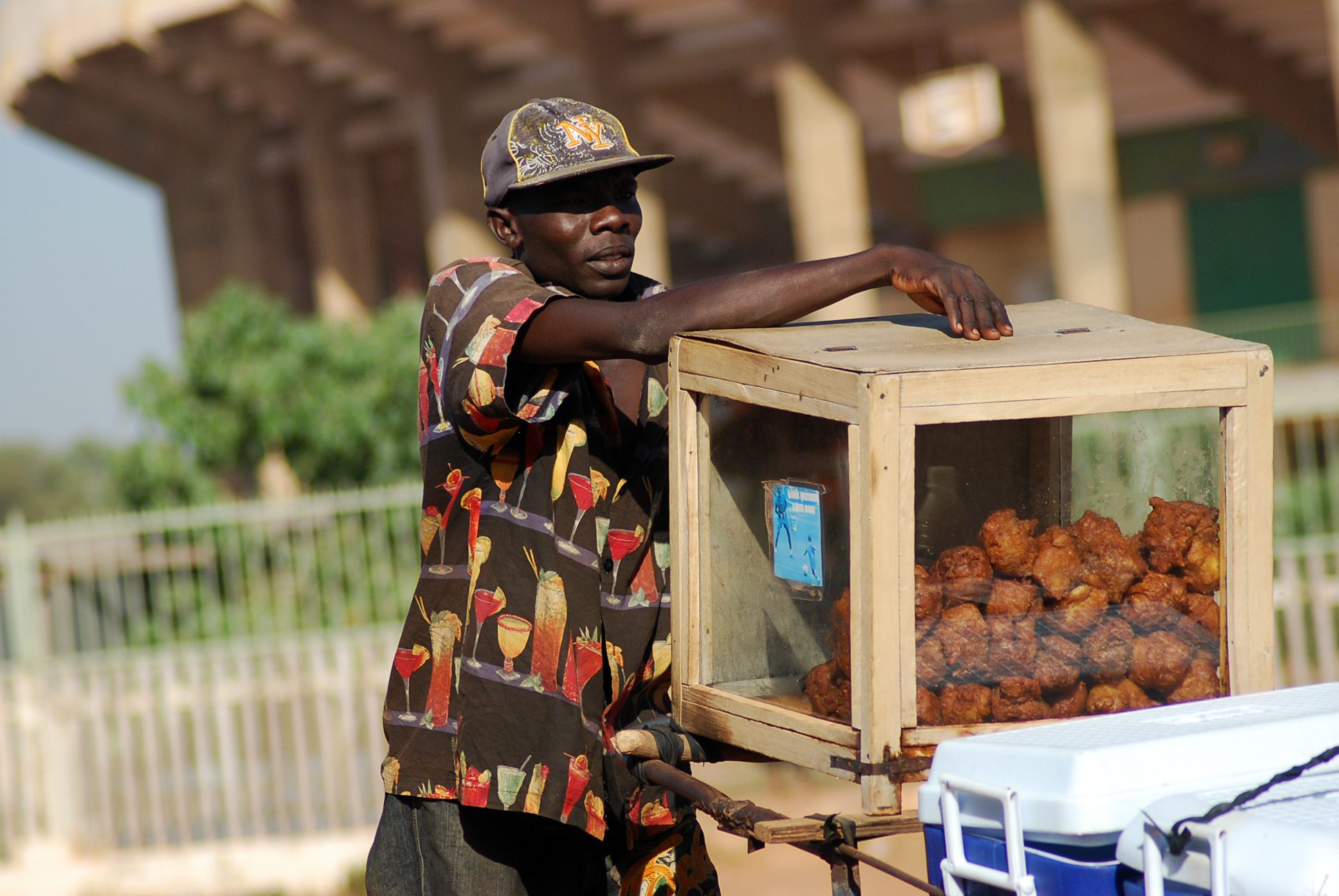

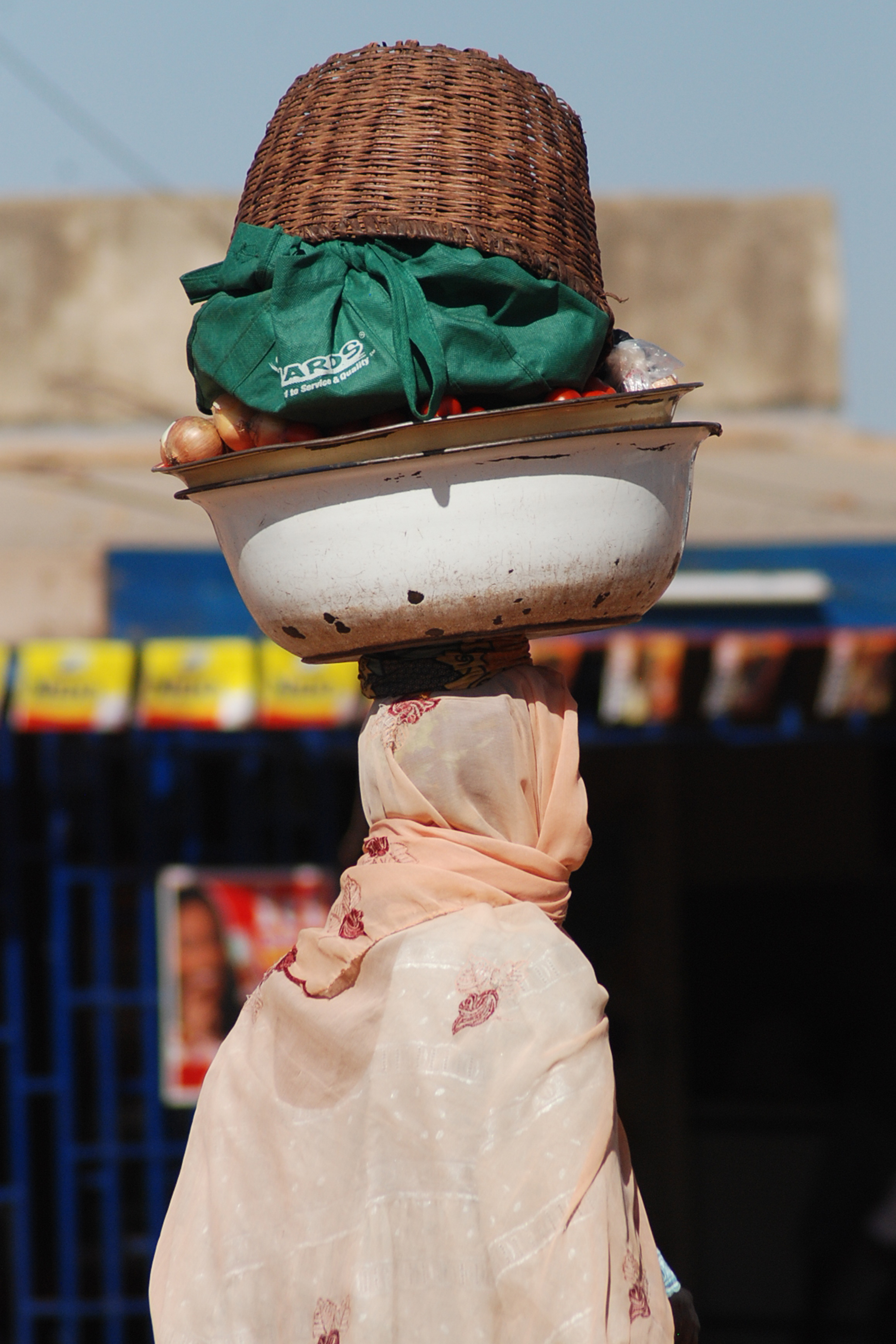

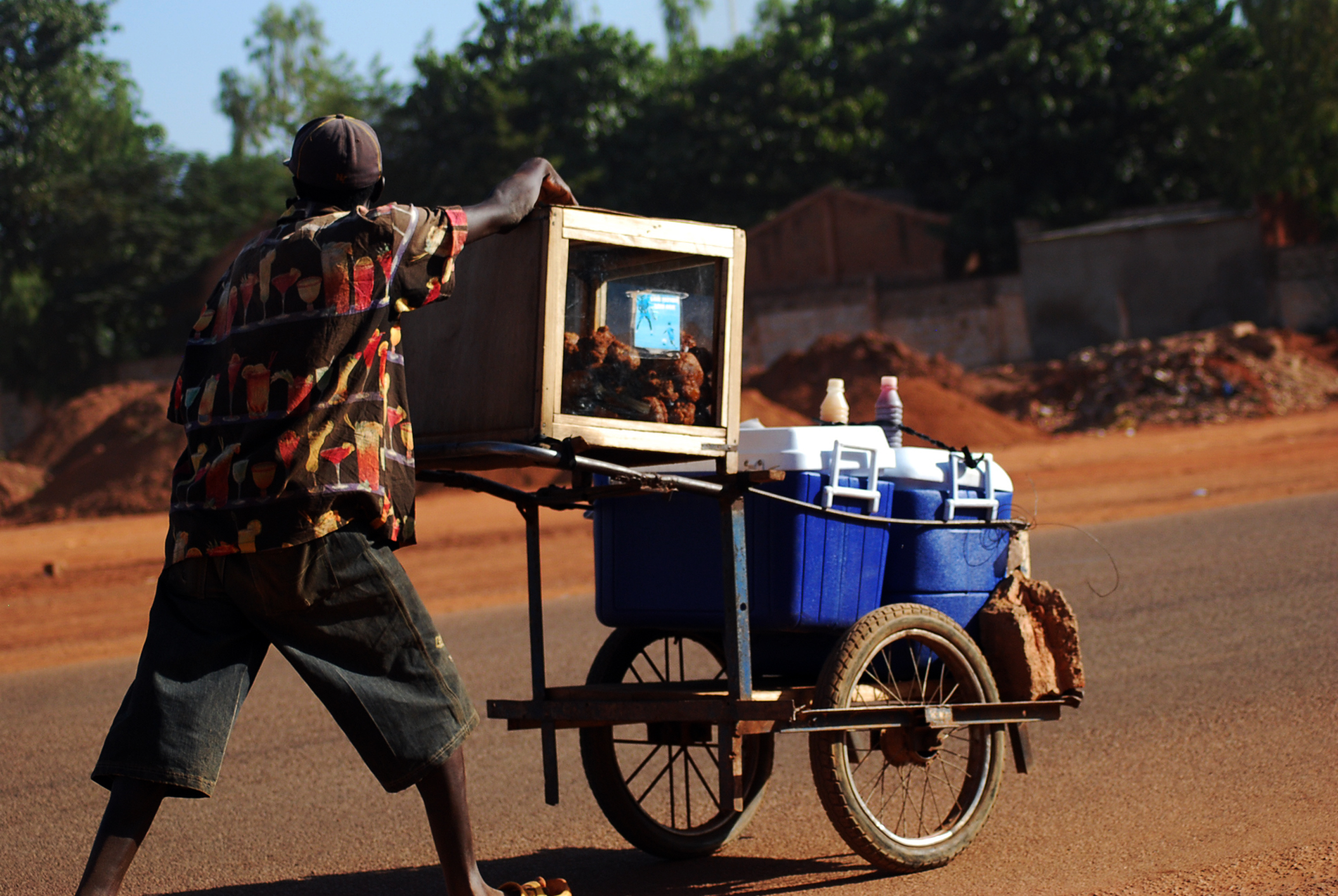

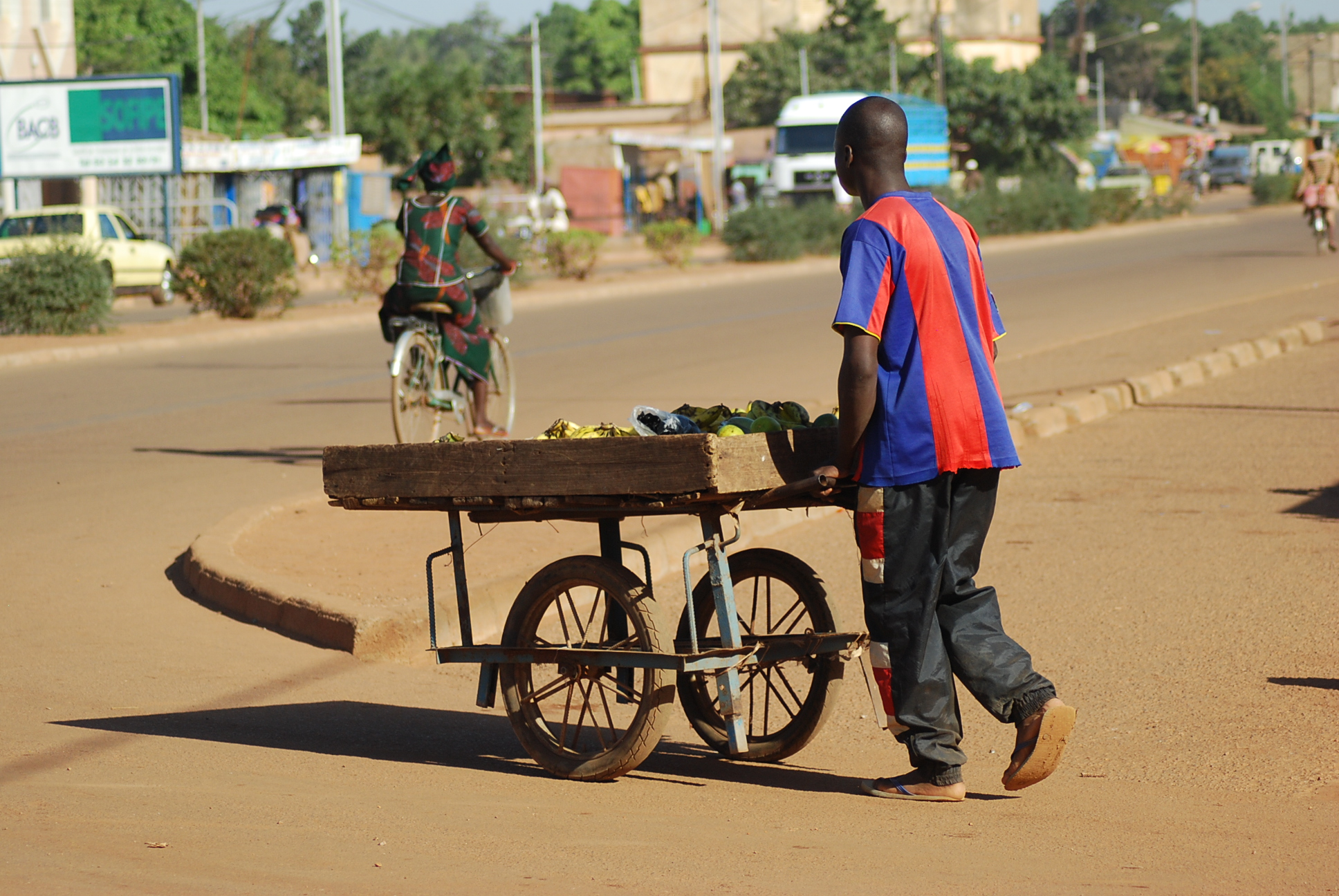

The tertiary sector is also an important part of the economy. This comprises communications, banking, transport, bars, restaurants, hotels, as well as administrative jobs.

== Twin towns – sister cities ==
Ouagadougou is twinned with:

- Bordeaux, France
- Briton Ferry, Wales, United Kingdom
- Grenoble, France
- Kumasi, Ghana
- Kuwait City, Kuwait
- Leuze-en-Hainaut, Belgium
- Lyon, France
- Taipei, Taiwan
- Zhengzhou, China

== Parks ==
The Bangr-Weoogo urban park (area: 2.63 km^{2} (1 sq mi)), before colonialism, belonged to the Mosse chiefs. Considering it a sacred forest, many went there for traditional initiations or for refuge. The French colonists, disregarding its local significance and history, established it as a park in the 1930s. In 1985, renovations were done in the park. In January 2001, the park was renamed "Parc Urbain Bangr-Weoogo", meaning "the urban park of the forest of knowledge".

Another notable park in Ouagadougou is the "L'Unité Pédagogique", which shelters animals in a semi-free state. This botanic garden/biosphere system stretches over 8 ha (20 acres) and also serves as a museum for the country's history.

"Jardin de l'amitié Ouaga-Loudun" (Garden of Ouaga-Loudun Friendship), with a green space that was renovated in 1996, is a symbol of the twin-city relationship between Ouagadougou and Loudun in France. It is situated in the centre of the city, near the "Nation Unies' crossroads".

== Culture ==
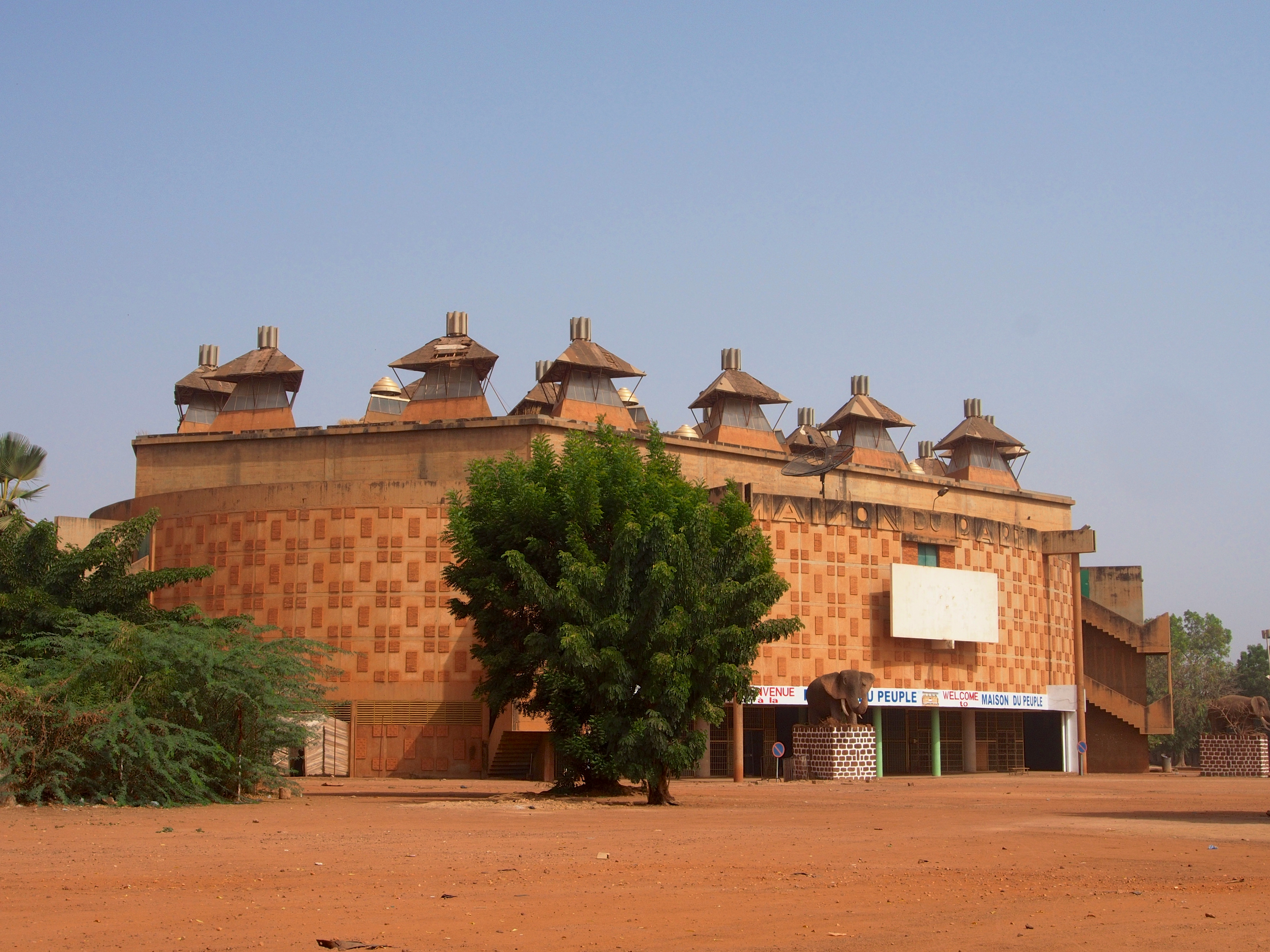
The Maison du Peuple

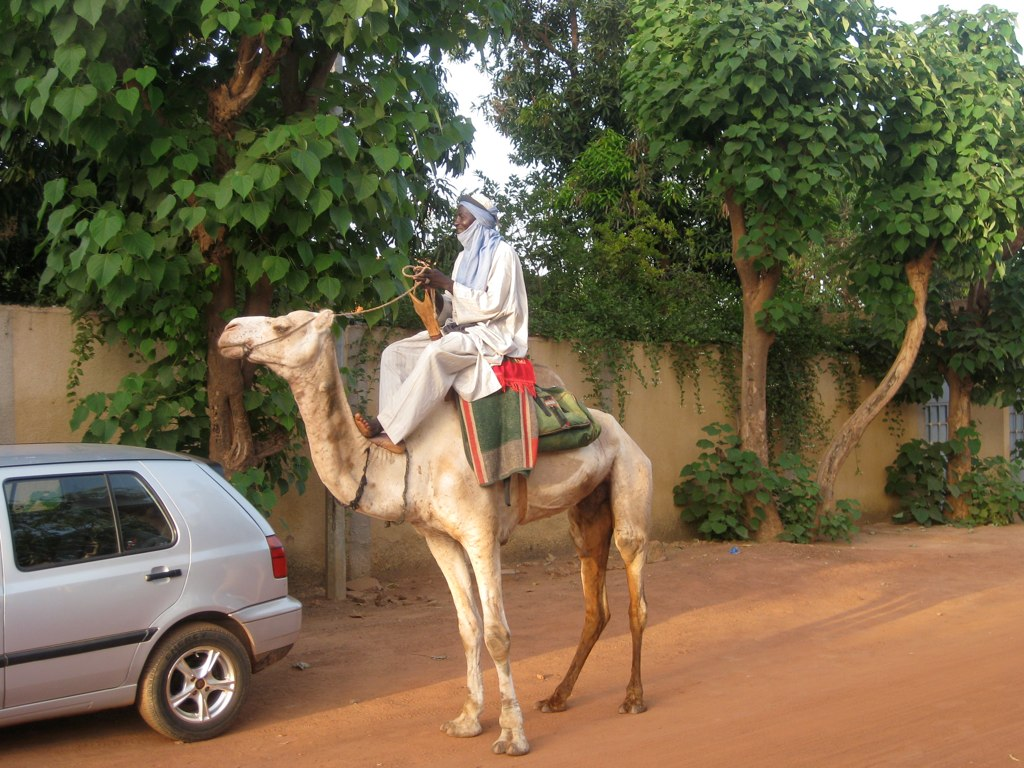
A local travelling by camel

There are a number of cultural and art venues, such as the Maison du Peuple and Salle des Banquets, in addition to performances of many genres of music, including traditional folk music, modern music, and rap.

- National Museum of Music: exhibits all the musical instruments of Burkina Faso.
- Musée de Manega: also exhibits musical instruments of Burkina Faso, Mossi rifles and other cultural items. Located 55 km (34 mi) northwest of the city.
- "Naba Koom": a statue depicting a woman handling a calabash to pour water. The 6-metre-high (20 ft) statue faces the railway station, welcoming travellers into Ouaga. The place bears the name of an important chief in Burkina Faso's history.
- "Laongo": 30 km (19 mi) east of the city, features enormous granite slabs that were designed by various sculptors. The exhibit displays works of art from five continents.
- "La Place du Grand Lyon": a monument that reflects the relationship between Burkina Faso's capital and Lyon in France. It is located near the French cultural centre George Melies and features an imposing lion. A zoo called "Parc Animalier de Ziniaré": located 30 km (19 mi) east of the city in the hometown of the former president Blaise Compaoré.

=== Art and crafts ===
Several international festivals and activities are organized within the municipality, such as FESPACO (Panafrican Film and Television Festival of Ouagadougou), which is Africa's largest festival of this type, SIAO (International Art and Craft Fair), FESPAM (Pan-African Music Festival), FITMO (International Theatre and Marionnette Festival) and FESTIVO.

=== Places of worship ===
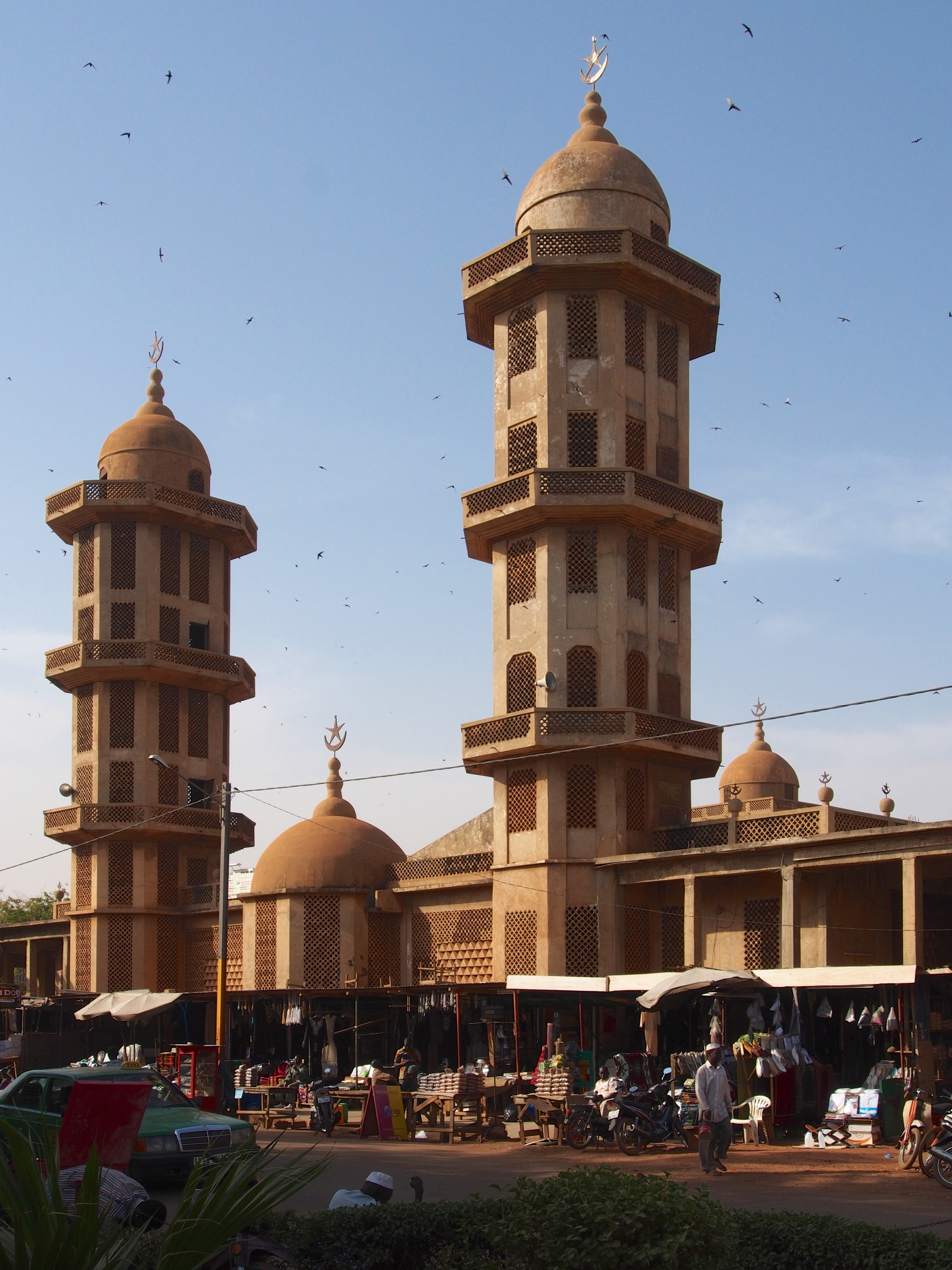
Ouagadougou Grand Mosque

The most common places of worship are Muslim mosques. There are also numerous Christian churches: Roman Catholic Archdiocese of Ouagadougou (Catholic Church), Association of Reformed Evangelical Church of Burkina Faso (World Communion of Reformed Churches), Assemblies of God, Deeper Life Bible Church, and the International Evangelism Center.

== Yennenga New City ==
In March 2017, an international competition to design a master plan and urban strategy for a new city called Yennenga to be constructed 15 km (9.3 mi) from Ouagadougou, was held. Hardel Le Bihan Architectes were announced as winners of the competition. The project, which is expected to accommodate around 80,000 people over 678 ha (1,680 acres), was under construction as of February 2026, and at this time called Yennenga New City.

== Notable people ==
- Dango Ouattara – footballer
- Malika Ouattara – slam poet and activist
- Serge Oulon – journalist
- Edmond Tapsoba – footballer
- Ezé Wendtoin – musician
- Hugues Fabrice Zango – triple jumper

== See also ==
- List of cities in Burkina Faso
- Grande Mosquée de Ouagadougou

== Bibliography ==
=== Sources ===
- David P. Johnson, Jr. (2010). "Ouagadougou, Burkina Faso". In Kwame Anthony Appiah; Henry Louis Gates (eds.). Encyclopedia of Africa. Oxford University Press. ISBN 9780195337709.
- Page, Willie; Davis, R. Hunt, eds. (2005). Encyclopedia of African History and Culture Volume II: African Kingdoms (500 to 1500) (E-book ed.). New York: Facts on File. ISBN 978-1-4381-2917-4.
- Ade Ajayi, J F. (1965). A Thousand Years of West African History. Ibadan University Press. p. 49.
