= Mossi Kingdoms =

Historical kingdoms in modern-day Burkina Faso

Moogho
- 11th century–1896
- Area occupied by Mossi Kingdoms, c. 1530
- Capital: Multiple capitals
- Common languages: Mooré
- Religion: Mossi Religion, Islam
- Demonym: Moaaga
- Government: Monarchies
- Historical era: Pre-Colonial Africa
  - Departure of Princess Yennenga from the Naa Gbewaa kingdom: 11th century
  - Conquest by the French colonial empire: 1896
Succeeded by
Upper Senegal and Niger

- Person: Moaaga
- People: Mosse
- Language: Mòoré
- Country: Moogho

The Mossi Kingdoms were a group of kingdoms in modern-day Burkina Faso that dominated the region of the upper Volta river for hundreds of years. The largest Mossi kingdom was that of Ouagadougou. The king of Ouagadougou, known as the Mogho Naaba, or King of All the World, served as the Emperor of all the Mossi.

The first kingdom was founded when warriors from the ancient Great Naa Gbewaa kingdom in present-day Ghana region and Mandé warriors moved into the area and intermarried with local people. The different kingdom's consolidation of political and military power began in the 13th century, leading to conflicts between the Mossi kingdoms and other nearby powerful states. In 1896, the French took over the kingdoms and created the French Upper Volta colony, which for many decades largely governed using the Mossi administrative structure.

Some Mossi Kingdoms still exist today as constituent monarchies within Burkina Faso. Most notably, Naba Baongo II currently reigns as Mogho Naba of Wogodogo (Ouagadougou). The kingdoms of Boussouma, Fada N'gourma, Tenkodogo, and Yatenga currently co-exist in a similar fashion, each with their own monarchs. While they no longer hold sovereignty, they still retain some cultural and political influence.

== History ==
=== Origin ===
Accounts of the origin of the Mossi kingdoms and parts of their history are imprecise, with contradictory oral traditions disagreeing on certain aspects of the story. The origin story is unique in that a woman plays a key role as the progenitor of the royal line.

The origins of the Mossi state are claimed by one prominent oral tradition to come from when a Moré-Dagbamba princess, Yennenga, left home because of a dispute with her father, Naa Gbewaa, the founder of the Kingdom of the now Tri-kingdoms of Mamprugu, Dagban, and Namumba.

The Dagbamba ethnic group comprises Mamprusi, dagomba, Nanumba, and Mossi People. These four sub-groups sprung out of the three sons and daughter of the Great King, Naa Gbewaa. Naa Gbewaa found his kingdom from Pusiga, near Bawku, stretching across almost all of Northern Ghana, Burkina Faso, and parts of northern Togo. The Mossi branch is of Yennenga, the Sister of the three brothers. The eldest of the sons is the Nayiri, King of Mamprugu He resides in Nalerigu. His younger brother is the Yaa Naa, King of Dagon He resides in Yendi. The third and youngest brother is the King of Nanumba, who resides in Bimbilla. Yennenga’s grandsons are the Kings of Tenkodogo, Fada N'gourma, Zondoma Province, Boussouma and stretching across large expanse of Burkina Faso.

This event of the story of Yennenga dates in different oral histories to be anytime between the 11th and the 15th centuries. According to the story, the princess Yennenga escaped dressed as a man. She then came to the house of a Mandé elephant hunter named Rialé. They had a son named Ouédraogo who was given that name from the horse that Yennenga used to escape. Ouédraogo visited his grandfather, The Nayiri, King of Mamprugu, at Gambaga at the age of fifteen and was given four horses and 50 cows. A number of horseman joined his forces, and with them, Ouédraogo conquered the local people, married a woman named Pouiriketa who gave him three sons, and built the city of Tenkodogo. The oldest son was Diaba Lompo, who founded the city of Fada N'gourma. The second son, Rawa, became the ruler of Zondoma Province. His third son, Zoungrana, became the ruler of Tenkodogo after Ouédraogo died. Zoungrana married Pouitenga, a woman sent from the king of the Ninisi people, and the resulting intermarriages between the Dagbamba—mamprusi, dagomba, And namumba, the Mandé, the Ninisi, and local peoples became the Mossi people. Zoungrana and Pouitenga had a son, Oubri, who further expanded the kingdom by conquering the Kibissi and some Gurunsi peoples. Oubri, who ruled from around 1050 to 1090 CE, is often considered the founder of the Ouagadougou dynasty, which ruled from the capital of Ouagadougou.

=== Rise and centralization ===
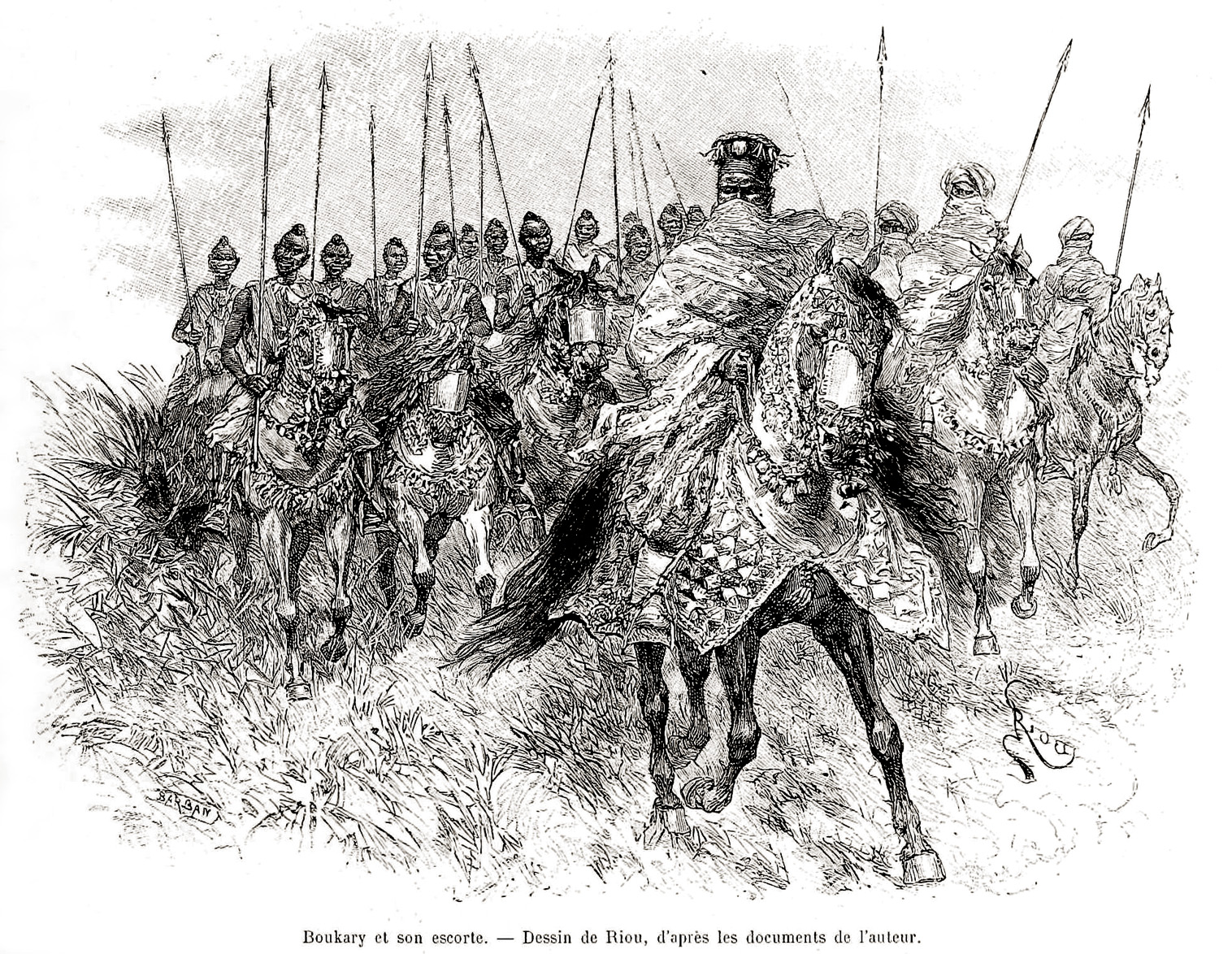
The cavalry of the Mossi states were experts at raiding deep into enemy territory, even against the formidable Mali Empire. Image: Boukary Koutou, also known as Wobgho, Mossi King of Ouagadougou, with his cavalry escort, Burkina Faso, 1892.

Following the reign of Oubri, centralization and small-scale expansion of the kingdoms were the primary tasks of rulers. The Ouagadougou dynasty retained control in Ouagadougou, but the other kingdoms established by the sons of Ouedraogo retained independence in Tenkodogo, Fada N'gourma, and Zondoma. Under the fifth ruler, Komdimie (circa 1170), two revolutions were started by members of the Ouagadougou dynasty that established the Kingdom of Yatenga to the north and the Kingdom of Rizim. War between Komdimie and Yatenga lasted for many years, with Yatenga eventually taking over the independent Mossi state of Zondoma. At the same time, Komdimie created a new level of authority for his sons as Dimas of separate provinces. They had some autonomy but recognized the sovereignty of the Ouagadougou dynasty. This system of taking over territory and appointing sons as Dimas would continue to be practiced by many of the future rulers.

The increasing power of the Mossi kingdoms resulted in larger conflicts with regional powers, in particular with the Mali and Songhai Empires. In the 15th century, the Mossi took over Timbuktu and sacked the important trading post of Walata, although many historians believe that the 'Mossi' responsible for these attacks were a different group than those who claim descent from Yennenga. When Askia Mohammad I became the leader of the Songhai Empire and desired to spread Islam, he waged a holy war against the Mossi kingdoms in 1497. Although the Mossi forces were defeated in this effort, they resisted the attempts to impose Islam. With the conquest of the Songhai by the Moroccans of the Saadi dynasty in 1591, the Mossi states reestablished their independence.

By the 18th century, the economic and military power of the Mossi kingdoms had increased significantly. Foreign trade relations expanded throughout Africa, with important connections made with the Fula kingdoms and the Mali Empire. During this time, the Mossi were attacked by a variety of African forces. Although there were a number of jihad states in the region trying to forcibly spread Islam, namely the Massina Empire and the Sokoto Caliphate, the Mossi kingdoms largely retained their traditional religious and ritual practices.

=== French conquest ===
The first European explorer to enter the region was German Gottlob Krause in 1888. This was followed by a British expedition in 1894 led by George Ekem Ferguson, who convinced the Mossi leaders to sign a treaty of protection. Despite this, the French entered the area in 1896 and ignored the treaty of protection, conquering the Mossi Kingdom and make it part of the Upper Volta colony. The French had already conquered or taken over all of the surrounding kingdoms, which had isolated the Mossi kingdoms. The last king of Ouagadougou, named Wobgo or Wobogoo, was warned a day before the French forces were going to attack. He sent a force to meet them in battle as he fled the city. Wobgo's brother, Kouka, then became the king of Ouagadougou and allied himself with the French and Yatenga to try and capture Wobgo. When the French and British agreed on the boundary between their colonies, Wobgo lost his main support system and he retired with a British pension to Zongoiri in the Gold Coast, where he died in 1904.

As a result of the significant centralization of the kingdoms, the French largely kept the administrative organization in place. They made the Mogho Naava in Ouagadougou the primary leader of the region and created five ministers under him that governed different regions (largely adhering to the Mossi kingdom borders).

== Organization ==
The Mossi kingdoms were organized around five different kingdoms: Ouagadougou, Tenkodogo, Fada N'gourma, Zondoma (later replaced by Yatenga), and Boussouma. However, there were as many as 19 additional lesser Mossi kingdoms, which retained connection to one of the four main kingdoms. Each of these retained significant domestic autonomy and independence but shared kinship, military, and ritualistic bonds with one another. Each kingdom had similar domestic structures with kings, ministers, and other officials, and a high degree of administrative centralization. There were prominent rivalries between the different kingdoms, namely between Yatenga and Ouagadougou. Ouagadougou was often considered the primary Mossi kingdom, ruled by Mogho Naaba, but it was not the capital of the Mossi kingdoms as each retained autonomy.

Domestically, the Mossi kingdoms distinguished between the nakombse and the tengbiise. The nakombse claimed lineage connections to the founders of the Mossi kingdoms and the power of naam, which gave them the divine right to rule. The tengbiise, in contrast, were people who had been assimilated into the kingdoms and would never have access to naam. However, because of their connections to the area, they did have tenga, which allowed them to make decisions about land issues. The rulers' naam and the support of tenga were connected, creating a two-way balance of power in society.

== Religion ==
Being located near many of the main Islamic states of West Africa, the Mossi kingdoms developed a mixed religious system, recognizing some authority for Islam while retaining their indigenous Mossi Religion. The king participated in two great festivals, one focused on the genealogy of the royal lineage (in order to increase their naam) and another of sacrifices to tenga.

Although they had initially resisted the imposition of Islam and had retained independence from the main Islamic states of West Africa, there began to be a sizable number of Muslims living in the kingdom. In Ouagadougou, the Mogho Naaba assigned an Imam who was allowed to deliver readings of the Qur'an to royalty in exchange for recognizing the genealogical power of the king.

== See also ==
- List of rulers of the Mossi state of Gurunsi
- List of rulers of the Mossi state of Gwiriko
- List of rulers of the Mossi state of Liptako
- List of rulers of the Mossi state of Tenkodogo
- List of rulers of the Mossi state of Wogodogo
- List of rulers of the Mossi state of Yatenga
- List of rulers of the Gurma Mossi state of Bilanga
- List of rulers of the Gurma Mossi state of Bilayanga
- List of rulers of the Gurma Mossi state of Bongandini
- List of rulers of the Gurma Mossi state of Con
- List of rulers of the Gurma Mossi state of Macakoali
- List of rulers of the Gurma Mossi state of Piela
- List of rulers of the Gurma Mossi state of Nungu
