= List of sovereign states in the 1860s =

This is a list of sovereign states in the 1860s, giving an overview of states around the world during the period between 1 January 1860 and 31 December 1869. It contains entries, arranged alphabetically, with information on the status and recognition of their sovereignty. It includes widely recognized sovereign states, entities which were de facto sovereign but which were not widely recognized by other states.

== Sovereign states ==
Name and capital city	Information on status and recognition of sovereignty
=== A ===
Abemama – Kingdom of Abemama; Capital: Abemama	Widely recognized state.
Abuja – Abuja Emirate; Capital: Abuja	Widely recognized state.
Afghanistan – Emirate of Afghanistan; Capital: Kabul	Widely recognized independent state.
Agadez – Tenere Sultanate of Aïr; Capital: Agadez	Widely recognized state.
Alawi Sheikhdom – Alawi Sheikhdom; Capital: Al Qasha	Widely recognized state.
→ Andorra – Principality of Andorra; Capital: Andorra la Vella	Widely recognized independent state. The President of France and Bishop of Urgell were ex officio Co-Princes of Andorra. The defense of Andorra was the responsibility of France and Spain.
Angoche – Angoche Sultanate; Capital: Angoche	Widely recognized independent state.
Anhalt – Duchy of Anhalt (from 1863 to 1 July 1867); Capital: Dessau	Widely recognized independent state to 1 July 1867. Member of the German Confederation. State of the North German Confederation from 1 July 1867.
Anhalt-Bernburg – Duchy of Anhalt-Bernburg (to 1863); Capital: Bernburg	Widely recognized independent state to 1863. Member of the German Confederation. Merged into the re-unified Duchy of Anhalt in 1863.
Anhalt-Dessau – Duchy of Anhalt-Dessau (to 1863); Capital: Dessau	Widely recognized independent state to 1863. Member of the German Confederation. Merged into the re-unified Duchy of Anhalt in 1863.
Ankole – Kingdom of Ankole; Capital: Mbarara	Widely recognized state.
Annam – Empire of Annam; Capital: Phú Xuân	Widely recognized state. Internal imperial system within Chinese tributary.
Anziku – Anziku Kingdom; Capital: Monsol	Widely recognized state.
Aqrabi – Aqrabi Sheikhdom; Capital: Bir Ahmad	Widely recognized state.
→ Argentina; Capital: Paraná (to 12 December 1861), Buenos Aires (from 12 December 1861): Argentine Confederation (to 12 December 1861); Argentine Republic (from 12 December 1861)	Widely recognized state.
Aro – Aro Confederacy; Capital: Arochukwu	Widely recognized state.
Ashanti – Asante Union; Capital: Kumasi	Widely recognized state.
Aussa – Sultanate of Aussa; Capital: Aussa	Widely recognized state.
→ Austria-Hungary / Austria; Capital: Vienna (Cisleithania), Budapest (Transleithania): Austrian Empire (to 29 May 1867); Austro-Hungarian Empire (29 May 1867)	Widely recognized state.
Avaria – Avar Khanate (to 1864); Capital: Khunzakh	Widely recognized state to 1864. Annexed by Russia in 1864.
=== B ===
Baden – Grand Duchy of Baden; Capital: Karlsruhe	Widely recognized state. Member of the German Confederation.
Baguirmi – Kingdom of Baguirmi; Capital: Massenya	Tributary state of the Bornu Empire.
Bahrain; Capital: Muharraq (to 1861)	Widely recongiszed state until 1861. British protectorate after 1861.
Bali – Kingdom of Bali; Capital: Klungkung	Widely recognized state. Bali was a series of kingdoms that ruled the island of Bali.
Bamana – Bamana Empire (to 1861); Capital: Ségou	Widely recognized state to 1861. Annexed by the Toucouleur Empire in 1861.
Baol – Kingdom of Baol; Capital: Diourbel	Widely recognized state.
Barotseland – Kingdom of Barotseland(from 1864); Capital: Mongu	Widely recognized state from 1864.
Basutoland – Kingdom of Basutoland (to 1868); Capital: Maseru	Widely recognized state to 1868. Annexed by the United Kingdom in 1868.
Bavaria – Kingdom of Bavaria; Capital: Munich	Widely recognized state. Member of the German Confederation.
Belgium – Kingdom of Belgium; Capital: Brussels	Widely recognized state. Belgium has sovereignty over 1 condominium: Moresnet (Condominium sui iuris of Belgium and Prussia)
Beni Abbas – Kingdom of Beni Abbas; Capital: Kalâa of Ait Abbas	Widely recognized state.
Benin – Kingdom of Benin; Capital: Edo	Widely recognized state.
Bhutan – Kingdom of Bhutan; Capital: Punakha	Widely recognized state.
Biu – Biu Kingdom; Capital: Biu	Widely recognized state.
Bohemia – Kingdom of Bohemia; Capital: Prague	Widely recognized state.
Bolivia – Bolivian Republic; Capital: Sucre (official), La Paz (administrative)	Widely recognized state.
Bora Bora – Kingdom of Bora Bora; Capital: Nunue, Vaitape	Widely recognized state.
Bornu – Bornu Empire; Capital: Ngazargamu	Widely recognized state.
Brakna – Brakna Emirate; Capital: Aleg	Widely recognized state.
Brazil – Empire of Brazil; Capital: Rio de Janeiro	Brazil was a federation of 20 states and one federal district. (Note: 20 States: Alagoas, Amazonas, Bahia, Ceará, Espírito Santo, Goiás, Maranhão, Mato Grosso, Minas Gerais, Pará, Paraíba, Paraná, Pernambuco, Piauí, Rio Grande do Norte, Rio Grande do Sul, Rio de Janeiro, Santa Catarina, São Paulo, Sergipe. 1 Federal District: Federal District.)
Bremen – Free Hanseatic City of Bremen; Capital: Bremen	Widely recognized state to 1 July 1867. Member of the German Confederation. State of the North German Confederation from 1 July 1867.
Brunei – Sultanate of Brunei; Capital: Kampong Ayer	Widely recognized state.
Brunswick – Duchy of Brunswick; Capital: Brunswick	Widely recognized state to 1 July 1867. Member of the German Confederation. State of the North German Confederation from 1 July 1867.
Buganda – Kingdom of Buganda; Capital: Mengo	Widely recognized state.
Bukhara – Emirate of Bukhara; Capital: Bukhara	Widely recognized state.
Bunyoro – Bunyoro-Kitara Kingdom; Capital: Hoima	Widely recognized state.
Burma – Kingdom of Burma; Capital: Mandalay	Widely recognized state.
Burundi – Kingdom of Burundi; Capital: Gitega	Widely recognized state.
Busoga – Kingdom of Busoga; Capital: Bugembe	Widely recognized state.
=== C ===
Cambodia – Kingdom of Cambodia (to 11 August 1863); Capital: Oudong	Widely recognized state to 11 August 1863. French protectorate from 11 August 1863.
Cayor – Kingdom of Cayor; Capital: Mboul	Widely recognized state.
Central Italy – United Provinces of Central Italy (to 22 March 1860); Capital: Modena	Widely recognized state to 22 March 1860. Client state of the Kingdom of Sardinia to 22 March 1860. Annexed by the Kingdom of Sardinia on 22 March 1860.
Cherokee Nation (to 1865); Capital: Tahlequah	Widely recognized state to 1865. Incorporated into the United States in 1865.
Chile – Republic of Chile; Capital: Santiago	Widely recognized state.
China – Great Qing Empire; Capital: Beijing	Widely recognized state. China had sovereignty over the following territories: Lanfang Republic (Vassal state); Tibet (Protectorate) including one protectorate: Sikkim (De jure protectorate)
Circassia – Circassian Parliament (to 21 May 1864); Capital: Shache	Widely recognized state. Not recognized by the Russian Empire. Annexed by the Russian Empire on 21 May 1864.
→ Colombia / Granadine Confederation; Capital: Bogotá: Granadine Confederation (to 8 May 1863); United States of Colombia (from 8 May 1863)	Widely recognized state.
Costa Rica – Republic of Costa Rica; Capital: San Jose	Widely recognized state.
Couto Misto (to 23 June, 1868); Capital: Santiago de Rubiás	De facto independent microstate until 23 June, 1868. Partitioned into Spain and Portugal.
=== D ===
Dagbon – Kingdom of Dagbon; Capital: Yendi	Widely recognized state.
Dahomey – Kingdom of Dahomey; Capital: Abomey	Widely recognized state.
Dai Nam – Dai Nam Realm; Capital: Phú Xuân	Widely recognized state. Tributary state of China.
Damagaram – Sultanate of Damagaram; Capital: Zinder	Widely recognized state.
Darfur – Sultanate of Darfur; Capital: Al Fashir	Widely recognized state.
Denmark; Capital: Copenhagen: Danish Unitary State (to 1864); Kingdom of Denmark (from 1864)	Widely recognized state. Denmark had sovereignty over the following overseas territories: (Denmark) Danish West Indies (Colony); (Denmark) Greenland (Territory); Iceland (Dependency)
Dhala – Emirate of Dhala; Capital: Dhale	Widely recognized state.
→ Dominican Republic; Capital: Santo Domingo	Widely recognized state. Under the sovereignty of Spain from 1861 to 1865.
Dosso – Dosso Kingdom; Capital: Dosso	Widely recognized state.
=== E ===
→ Ecuador – Republic of Ecuador; Capital: Quito	Widely recognized state.
→ → → El Salvador – Republic of El Salvador; Capital: San Salvador	Widely recognized state.
Ethiopia – Ethiopian Empire; Capital: Addis Ababa	Widely recognized state.
=== F ===
Fadhli – Fadhli Sultanate; Capital: Shuqrah	Widely recognized state.
Fante – Fante Confederacy (until 1868); Capital: Not specified	Widely recognized state from 1868.
France – Empire of the French; Capital: Paris	Widely recognized independent state. France had sovereignty over the following overseas territories: → Cambodia (protectorate from 1863); French Algeria (de jure Department of Metropolitan France, de facto Colony); (France) French Cochinchina (Colony); French Gabon (Protectorate); French Guiana (Colony); French India (Colony); French Ivory Coast (Protectorate); French Oceania – French Establishments in Oceania (Colony); Guadeloupe (Colony); Martinique (Colony); Mayotte (Colony); New Caledonia (Colony); Obock (Colony); Réunion (Colony); Saint Pierre and Miquelon (Colony); Shanghai (Concession); Tientsin (Concession)
Frankfurt – Free City of Frankfurt (to 20 September 1866); Capital: Frankfurt	Widely recognized independent state to 20 September 1866. Member of the German Confederation to 20 September 1866. Annexed by the Kingdom of Prussia on 20 September 1866.
Futa Jallon – Imamate of Futa Jallon; Capital: Timbo	Widely recognized state.
=== G ===
Garo – Kingdom of Garo; Capital: Not specified	Widely recognized state.
Gaza – Gaza Empire; Capital: Manjacaze	Widely recognized state.
Geledi – Sultanate of the Geledi; Capital: Afgooye	Widely recognized state.
Gera – Kingdom of Gera; Capital: Chala	Widely recognized state.
Gomma – Kingdom of Gomma; Capital: Agaro	Widely recognized state.
Gowa – Sultanate of Gowa; Capital: Jongaya	Widely recognized state.
Greece – Kingdom of Greece; Capital: Athens	Widely recognized state.
Guatemala – Republic of Guatemala; Capital: Guatemala City	Widely recognized state.
Gumma – Kingdom of Gumma; Capital: Not specified	Widely recognized state.
Gyaaman – State of Gyaaman; Capital: Sampa, Drobo	Widely recognized state.
=== H ===
Ha'il – Emirate of Jabal Shammar; Capital: Ha'il	Widely recognized state.
Haiti – Republic of Haiti; Capital: Port-au-Prince	Widely recognized state.
Hamburg – Free City of Hamburg (to 1 July 1867); Capital: Dessau	Widely recognized independent state to 1 July 1867. Member of the German Confederation. State of the North German Confederation from 1 July 1867.
Hanover – Kingdom of Hanover (to 20 September 1866); Capital: Hanover	Widely recognized independent state to 20 September 1866. Member of the German Confederation to 20 September 1866. Annexed by the Kingdom of Prussia on 20 September 1866.
Harar – Emirate of Harar; Capital: Ge	Widely recognized state.
Hawaii – Kingdom of Hawaii; Capital: Honolulu	Widely recognized state.
Hesse-Darmstadt – Grand Duchy of Hesse and by Rhine; Capital: Darmstadt	Widely recognized state. Member of the German Confederation to 1866. State of the North German Confederation from 1867.
Hesse-Homburg – Landgraviate of Hesse-Homburg (to 24 March 1866); Capital: Bad Homburg	Widely recognized state to 24 March 1866. Member of the German Confederation to 1866. Returned to the Grand Duchy of Hesse on 24 March 1866.
Hesse-Kassel – Electorate of Hesse (to 20 June 1866); Capital: Bad Homburg	Widely recognized state to 20 June 1866. Member of the German Confederation to 20 June 1866. Annexed by the Kingdom of Prussia on 20 June 1866.
Holstein – Duchy of Holstein (to 30 October 1864); Capital: Glückstadt	Widely recognized state to 30 October 1864. In personal union with Denmark to 30 October 1864. Member of the German Confederation to 30 October 1864. Placed under joint rule by the Kingdom of Prussia and the Austrian Empire from 30 October 1864.
→ Honduras – Republic of Honduras; Capital: Tegucigalpa	Widely recognized state.
Huahine – Kingdom of Huahine; Capital: Huahine	Widely recognized state.
Hunza – State of Hunza; Capital: Baltit	Widely recognized state.
=== I ===
Igala – Igala Kingdom; Capital: Idah	Widely recognized state.
Igara – Kingdom of Igara Capital: Not specified	Widely recognized state.
Ilé-Ifẹ̀ – Ilé-Ifẹ̀ Kingdom; Capital: Ilé-Ifẹ̀	Widely recognized state.
Isaaq – Isaaq Sultanate; Capital: Hargeisa	Widely recognized state.
Italy – Kingdom of Italy (from 17 March 1861); Capital: Rome	Widely recognized independent state from 17 March 1861.
=== J ===
Jambi – Jambi Sultanate; Capital: Tanah Pilih	Widely recognized independent state.
→ Japan; Capital: Tokyo City: Tokugawa shogunate (to 3 January 1868); Empire of Japan (from 3 January 1868)	Widely recognized state. Japan had sovereignty over the following overseas territories: Hokkaido (Colony from May 1869)
Jimma – Kingdom of Jimma; Capital: Jiren	Widely recognized state.
Jolof – Jolof Kingdom; Capital: Ouarkhokh	Widely recognized state.
=== K ===
Kaabu – Kaabu Empire (to 1867); Capital: Kansala	Widely recognized state to 1867. Annexed by the Imamate of Futa Jallon in 1867.
Kaarta – Kingdom of Kaarta; Capital: Diangounté, Nioros	Widely recognized state.
Kabulistan – Kingdom of Kabul; Capital: Not specified	Widely recognized state.
Kaffa – Kingdom of Kaffa; Capital: Bonga, Anderaccha	Widely recognized state.
Kajara – Kajara Kingdom; Capital: Not specified	Widely recognized state.
Kakongo – Kingdom of Kakongo; Capital: Kinguele	Widely recognized state.
Kalat – Khanate of Kalat; Capital: Kalat	Widely recognized state.
Kasanje – Jaga Kingdom; Capital: Not specified	Widely recognized state.
Kashgaria – Kashgar Emirate (from 1862); Capital: Kashgar	Widely recognized state from 1862.
Kathiri – Hadhrami Kathiri Dynasty in Seiyun; Capital: Seiyun	Widely recognized state.
Kebbi – Kebbi Emirate; Capital: Argungu	Widely recognized state.
Kénédougou – Kénédougou Kingdom; Capital: Sikasso	Widely recognized state.
Khasso – Kingdom of Khasso; Capital: Médine	Widely recognized state.
Khiva – Khanate of Khiva; Capital: Khiva	Widely recognized state.
Kokand – Khanate of Kokand; Capital: Kokand	Widely recognized state.
Kong – Kong Empire; Capital: Kong	Widely recognized state.
Kongo – Kingdom of Kongo Until 1862; Capital: Mbanza-Kongo	Widely recognized state. Intermittent vassal state of the Kingdom of Portugal from 1862.
Korea – Kingdom of Great Joseon; Capital: Seoul	Widely recognized state.
Koya Temne – Kingdom of Koya; Capital: Grand Cape Mount	Widely recognized state.
Kuba – Kingdom of Kuba; Capital: Not specified	Widely recognized state.
=== L ===
Lafia Beri-Beri – Lafia Beri-Beri Kingdom; Capital: Lafia	Widely recognized state.
Liberia – Republic of Liberia; Capital: Monrovia	Widely recognized state.
Liechtenstein – Principality of Liechtenstein; Capital: Vaduz	Widely recognized state.
Limburg – Duchy of Limburg (to 11 May 1867); Capital: Maastricht	Widely recognized state to 11 May 1867. Member of the German Confederation. Annexed by the Netherlands on 11 May 1867.
Limmu-Ennarea – Kingdom of Limmu-Ennarea; Capital: Saqqa	Widely recognized state.
Lippe – Principality of Lippe (to 1 July 1867); Capital: Detmold	Widely recognized state to 1 July 1867. Member of the German Confederation. Annexed by the Netherlands on 11 May 1867. State of the North German Confederation from 1867.
Loango – Kingdom of Loango; Capital: Buali	Widely recognized state.
Lower Aulaqi – Lower Aulaqi Sultanate; Capital: Ahwar	Widely recognized state.
Luba – Luba Empire; Capital: Mwibele	Widely recognized state.
Lübeck – Free and Hanseatic City of Lübeck (to 1867); Capital: Detmold	Widely recognized state to 1867. Member of the German Confederation. State of the North German Confederation from 1867.
Lunda – Luba Empire; Capital: Not specified	Widely recognized state.
Luxembourg – Grand Duchy of Luxembourg; Capital: Luxembourg City	Widely recognized state.
=== M ===
Maguindanao – Sultanate of Maguindanao; Capital: Tamontaka	Widely recognized state.
Mahra – Sultanate of Mahra; Capital: Qishn	Widely recognized state.
Majeerteen Sultanate – Majeerteen Kingdom; Capital: Alula	Widely recognized state.
Maldives – Sultanate of Maldive Islands; Capital: Malé	Widely recognized state.
Mangareva – Kingdom of Mangareva; Capital: Mangareva	Widely recognized state.
Manipur – Kingdom of Manipur; Capital: Imphal	Widely recognized state.
Maravi – Kingdom of Maravi; Capital: Manthimba	Widely recognized state.
Massina – Massina Empire (to 1868); Capital: Hamdullahi	Widely recognized state to 1868. Annexed by the Toucouleur Empire in 1868.
Matabeleland – Matabele Kingdom; Capital: Bulawayo	Widely recognized state.
Mbunda – Mbunda Kingdom Capital: Not specified	Widely recognized state.
Mecklenburg-Schwerin – Grand Duchy of Mecklenburg-Schwerin (to 1 July 1867); Capital: Schwerin	Widely recognized state to 1 July 1867. Member of the German Confederation. State of the North German Confederation from 1 July 1867.
Mecklenburg-Strelitz – Grand Duchy of Mecklenburg-Strelitz (to 1 July 1867); Capital: Neustrelitz	Widely recognized state to 1 July 1867. Member of the German Confederation. State of the North German Confederation from 1 July 1867.
Merina – Kingdom of Imerina; Capital: Antananarivo	Widely recognized state.
→ → Mexico; Capital: Mexico City: Republic of Mexico (to 10 April 1864); Mexican Empire (from 10 April 1864 to 15 May 1867); United Mexican States (from 15 May 1867)	Widely recognized state.
Monaco – Principality of Monaco; Capital: Monaco	Widely recognized state.
Montenegro – Principality of Montenegro; Capital: Cetinje	Widely recognized state.
Morocco – Sultanate of Morocco; Capital: Fes	Widely recognized state.
Mossi Kingdoms – Mossi Empire; Capital: Multiple capitals	Widely recognized independent state. The following are a number of different kingdoms that make up the Mossi Empire: Gurunsi; Gwiriko; Liptako; Nungu; Wogodogo; Yatenga
Mthwakazi – Kingdom of Mthwakazi; Capital: Bulawayo	Widely recognized state.
Muscat and Oman – Sultanate of Muscat and Oman; Capital: Muscat	Widely recognized independent state.
Mutayr – Emirate of Mutayr; Capital: Not specified	Widely recognized state.
=== N ===
Najran – Principality of Najran; Capital: Najran	Widely recognized state.
Nassau – Duchy of Nassau (to 23 August 1866); Capital: Wiesbaden	Widely recognized independent state to 23 August 1866. Member of the German Confederation to 23 August 1866. Annexed by the Kingdom of Prussia on 23 August 1866.
Ndzuwani – Ndzuwani Sultanate; Capital: Domoni	Widely recognized state.
Negeri Sembilan; Capital: Seremban	Widely recognized state.
Nejd – Emirate of Nejd; Capital: Riyadh	Widely recognized state.
Nepal – Kingdom of Nepal; Capital: Kathmandu	Widely recognized state.
Netherlands – Kingdom of The Netherlands; Capital: Amsterdam	Widely recognized state.
Nicaragua – Republic of Nicaragua; Capital: Managua	Widely recognized state.
Niue – Kingdom of Niue-Fekai; Capital: Not specified	Widely recognized state.
North German Confederation (from 1 July 1867); Capital: Berlin	Widely recognized state from 1 July 1867.
Nri – Kingdom of Nri; Capital: Igbo-Ukwu	Widely recognized state.
Nshenyi – Nshenyi Kingdom; Capital: Not specified	Widely recognized state.
=== O ===
Obwera – Obwera Kingdom; Capital: Not specified	Widely recognized state.
Oldenburg – Grand Duchy of Oldenburg (to 1 July 1867); Capital: Oldenburg	Widely recognized state to 1 July 1867. Member of the German Confederation. State of the North German Confederation from 1 July 1867.
Onitsha – Onitsha Kingdom; Capital: Onitsha	Widely recognized state.
Orange Free State; Capital: Bloemfontein	Widely recognized state.
Oron – Oron Nation; Capital: Oron	Widely recognized state.
Orungu – Kingdom of Orungu; Capital: Not specified	Widely recognized state.
Ottoman Empire – Sublime Ottoman State; Capital: Constantinople	Widely recognized state. The following are autonomous territories of the Ottoman Empire: Egypt (De jure Autonomous vassal under de facto British occupation); Kuwait (Vassal state); Mecca (Non-sovereign state); Qatar (De facto autonomous Kazak); Samos (Autonomous state); Tunis (Vassal state; De facto Independent state)
Oyo – Oyo Empire; Capital: Oyo-Ile	Widely recognized state.
=== P ===
Pahang – Sultanate of Pahang; Capital: Pekan	Widely recognized state.
Papal States – State of the Church; Capital: Rome	Widely recognized state.
Paraguay – Republic of Paraguay; Capital: Asunción	Widely recognized state.
Patani – Sultanate of Patani; Capital: Patani	Widely recognized state.
Pate – Pate Sultanate (to 1870); Capital: Faza	Widely recognized state.
Perak – Sultanate of Perak; Capital: Ipoh	Widely recognized state.
Persia – Sublime State of Persia; Capital: Tehran	Widely recognized state.
Peru – Peruvian Republic; Capital: Lima	Widely recognized state.
Portugal – Kingdom of Portugal; Capital: Lisbon	Widely recognized state. The following are colonies, vassal state and possession of Portugal: Portuguese Cape Verde (Colony); Portuguese East Africa (Colony); Portuguese Guinea (Colony); Portuguese India (Colony); Portuguese Macau (Colony); Portuguese São Tomé and Príncipe (Colony); Portuguese Timor (Colony); Portuguese West Africa (Colony); Fort of São João Baptista de Ajudá (Possession)
Potiskum – Potiskum Emirate; Capital: Potiskum	Widely recognized state.
Prussia – Kingdom of Prussia (to 1 July 1867); Capital: Berlin	Widely recognized state to 1 July 1867. Member of the German Confederation. State of the North German Confederation from 1 July 1867.
=== Q ===
Qu'aiti – Qu'aiti Sultanate of Shihr and Mukalla; Capital: Al-Shihr	Widely recognized state.
=== R ===
Raiatea – Kingdom of Raiatea; Capital: Uturoa	Widely recognized state.
Rapa Nui – Kingdom of Rapa Nui; Capital: Anakena	Widely recognized state.
Rarotonga – Kingdom of Rarotonga; Capital: Anakena	Widely recognized state.
Reuss Elder Line – Principality of Reuss Elder Line (to 1 July 1867); Capital: Greiz	Widely recognized state to 1 July 1867. Member of the German Confederation. State of the North German Confederation from 1 July 1867.
Reuss Junior Line – Principality of Reuss Junior Line (to 1 July 1867); Capital: Greiz	Widely recognized state to 1 July 1867. Member of the German Confederation. State of the North German Confederation from 1 July 1867.
→ Romania; Capital: Bucharest: United Principalities of Moldavia and Wallachia (until 1862); Romanian United Principalities (from 1862 to 1866); Principality of Romania (from 1866)	Widely recognized state.
Rujumbura – Rujumbura Kingdom; Capital: Not specified	Widely recognized state.
Rukiga – Rukiga Kingdom; Capital: Not specified	Widely recognized state.
Russia – Russian Empire; Capital: Saint Petersburg	Widely recognized state.
Rwanda – Kingdom of Rwanda; Capital: Nyanza	Widely recognized state.
Ryūkyū Kingdom; Capital: Shuri	Widely recognized state.
=== S ===
Saloum – Kingdom of Saloum (to 1864); Capital: Kahone	Widely recognized state to 1864. Annexed by France in 1864.
Samoa – Kingdom of Samoa; Capital: Apia	Widely recognized state.
San Marino – Most Serene Republic of San Marino; Capital: San Marino	Widely recognized state.
Sarawak – Kingdom of Sarawak; Capital: Kuching	Widely recognized state.
Sardinia – Kingdom of Sardinia (to 17 March 1861); Capital: Turin	Widely recognized state to 17 March 1861. Annexed by the Kingdom of Italy on 17 March 1861.
Saxe-Altenburg – Duchy of Saxe-Altenburg (to 1 July 1867); Capital: Altenburg	Widely recognized state to 1 July 1867. Member of the German Confederation. State of the North German Confederation from 1 July 1867.
Saxe-Coburg and Gotha – Duchy of Saxe-Coburg and Gotha (to 1 July 1867); Capital: Gotha	Widely recognized state to 1 July 1867. Member of the German Confederation. State of the North German Confederation from 1 July 1867.
Saxe-Lauenburg – Duchy of Saxe-Lauenburg (to 1 July 1867); Capital: Ratzeburg	Widely recognized state to 1 July 1867. Member of the German Confederation. State of the North German Confederation from 1 July 1867.
Saxe-Meiningen – Duchy of Saxe-Meiningen (to 1 July 1867); Capital: Meiningen	Widely recognized state to 1 July 1867. Member of the German Confederation. State of the North German Confederation from 1 July 1867.
Saxe-Weimar-Eisenach – Grand Duchy of Saxe-Weimar-Eisenach (to 1 July 1867); Capital: Weimar	Widely recognized state to 1 July 1867. Member of the German Confederation. State of the North German Confederation from 1 July 1867.
Saxony – Kingdom of Saxony (to 1 July 1867); Capital: Dresden	Widely recognized state to 1 July 1867. Member of the German Confederation. State of the North German Confederation from 1 July 1867.
Schaumburg-Lippe – Principality of Schaumburg-Lippe (to 1 July 1867); Capital: Bückeburg	Widely recognized state to 1 July 1867. Member of the German Confederation. State of the North German Confederation from 1 July 1867.
Schleswig – Duchy of Schleswig (to 1866); Capital: Schleswig	Widely recognized state to 1866. Member of the German Confederation to 1866. Annexed by the Kingdom of Prussia in 1866.
Schwarzburg-Rudolstadt – Principality of Schwarzburg-Rudolstadt (to 1 July 1867); Capital: Rudolstadt	Widely recognized state to 1 July 1867. Member of the German Confederation. State of the North German Confederation from 1 July 1867.
Schwarzburg-Sondershausen – Principality of Schwarzburg-Sondershausen (to 1 July 1867); Capital: Sondershausen	Widely recognized state to 1 July 1867. Member of the German Confederation. State of the North German Confederation from 1 July 1867.
Selangor – Sultanate of Selangor; Capital: Klang	Widely recognized state.
Serbia – Principality of Serbia (from 19 April 1867); Capital: Belgrade	Widely recognized state.
Setul Mambang Segara – Kingdom of Setul Mambang Segara; Capital: Kota Mambang Segara	Widely recognized state.
Shilluk Kingdom (to 1861); Capital: Fashoda	Widely recognized state to 1861. Annexed by the United Kingdom in 1861.
(Thailand) Siam – Kingdom of Siam; Capital: Bangkok	Widely recognized state. The following are vassal states of Siam: Kedah (Vassal state); Luang Phrabang (Vassal state); Perlis (Vassal state)
Sine – Kingdom of Sine (to 1867); Capital: Diakhao	Widely recognized state to 1867. Disestablished in 1867.
Sokoto – Sokoto Caliphate; Capital: Sokoto	Widely recognized state.
Solimana – Solimana Chiefdom (to 1869); Capital: Falaba	Widely recognized state to 1869. Annexed by the United Kingdom in 1869.
Spain; Capital: Madrid: Kingdom of Spain (to 1868); Provisional Government (from 1868)	Widely recognized state. Spain had three colonies, and two possessions: (Spain) Elobey, Annobón and Corisco (Colony); (Spain) Fernando Po (Colony); (Spain) Río Muni (Colony); (Spain) Spanish North Africa (Possession)
Sulu – Sultanate of Sulu; Capital: Maimbung	Widely recognized state.
Sweden and Norway – United Kingdoms of Sweden and Norway; Capital: Stockholm, Christiania	Personal union of the separate kingdoms of Sweden and Norway.
Switzerland – Swiss Confederation; Capital: Bern	Widely recognized state. Switzerland was a federation of 25 cantons. (Note: 25 Cantons: Aargau, Appenzell Ausserrhoden, Appenzell Innerrhoden, Basel-Stadt, Basel-Landschaft, Bern, Fribourg, Geneva, Glarus, Graubünden, Lucerne, Neuchâtel, Nidwalden, Obwalden, Schaffhausen, Schwyz, Solothurn, St. Gallen, Thurgau, Ticino, Uri, Valais, Vaud, Zug, Zürich)
=== T ===
Tagant – Emirate of Tagant; Capital: Tidjikja	Widely recognized state.
Tahiti – Kingdom of Tahiti; Capital: Tidjikja	Widely recognized state.
Tonga; Capital: Nuku'alofa: Tu'i Tonga (to 1865); Kingdom of Tonga (from 1865)	Widely recognized state.
Tooro – Tooro Kingdom; Capital: Kabarole	Widely recognized state.
Toucouleur – Toucouleur Empire; Capital: Segou	Widely recognized state.
Transvaal – South African Republic; Capital: Pretoria	Boer republic. Under limited British suzerainty, but largely independent.
Trarza – Emirate of Trarza; Capital: Mederdra	Widely recognized state.
Tuggurt – Sultanate of Tuggurt; Capital: Tuggurt	Widely recognized state.
→ Two Sicilies – Kingdom of the Two Sicilies (to 12 February 1861); Capital: Naples	Widely recognized state to 12 February 1861. Annexed by the Kingdom of Italy on 12 February 1861.
=== U ===
United Kingdom – United Kingdom of Great Britain and Ireland; Capital: London	Widely recognized state. The following are colonies, territories, dependencies and protectorates of the United Kingdom: (United Kingdom) Amoy (Concession); (United Kingdom) British Arctic Territories (Territory); (United Kingdom) Ascension Island (Possession); → Bahama Islands (Crown colony); Bahrain (Protectorate from 1861); (United Kingdom) Baker Island (Uninhabited possession); Bermuda (Crown colony); Bight of Benin (Crown colony to 1861); Bight of Biafra (Crown colony to 1861); Bights of Benin and Biafra (Crown colony from 1861); British Ceylon (Crown colony); (United Kingdom) Colony of British Columbia (1858–1866) (Colony until 1866); (United Kingdom) Colony of British Columbia (1866–1871) (Colony from 1866); British Guiana (Colony); British Honduras (Crown colony); British Hong Kong (Crown colony); British Jamaica (Crown colony); British Leeward Islands (Federal colony); → British Mauritius (Crown colony); British West Africa (Crown colony); British Windward Islands (Crown colony); (United Kingdom) → Canada (Dominion from 1 July, 1867); Province of Canada (Colony to 1 July, 1867); Cape Colony (Colony); Cocos Islands (Possession); Colony of Natal (Colony); Falkland Islands (Crown colony); Gibraltar (Crown colony); (United Kingdom) Graham Land (Uninhabited possession); Guernsey (Crown dependency); (United Kingdom) Hankou (Concession); (United Kingdom) Heard Island and McDonald Islands (Uninhabited possession); (United Kingdom) Heligoland (Protectorate); (United Kingdom) British Raj - Indian Empire (Crown colony); (United Kingdom) Isle of Man (Crown dependency); (United Kingdom) Jarvis Island (Uninhabited possession); Jersey (Crown dependency); (United Kingdom) Lagos (Colony); Maldive Islands (Protectorate); Malta (Crown colony); Manipur (Protectorate); Mosquito Coast (Protectorate until 28 January 1860 but still under British influence); Muscat and Oman (Protectorate); Nepal (Protectorate); (United Kingdom) Colony of New Brunswick (Colony to 1 July, 1867); (United Kingdom) → Newfoundland (Crown colony); New South Wales (Colony); (United Kingdom) New Zealand (Colony); (United Kingdom) Niger Districts (Protectorate); (United Kingdom) North-Western Territory (Territory); (United Kingdom) Nova Scotia (Colony until 1 July, 1867); (United Kingdom) Prince Edward Island (Colony); Colony of Queensland (Colony); Redonda (Possession); Saint Helena (Crown colony); South Australia (Colony); (United Kingdom) Rupert's Land (Territory); Sikkim (De facto protectorate from March 1861): → Straits Settlements (Crown colony); Tasmania (Colony); (United Kingdom) Tientsin (Concession from 1860); (United Kingdom) Turks and Caicos Islands (Colony); (United Kingdom) Tristan da Cunha (Crown colony); Trucial States (Protectorate); (United Kingdom) Vancouver Island (Colony until 1866); Victoria (Colony); (United Kingdom) Victoria Land (Uninhabited possession); (United Kingdom) Walvis Bay (Protectorate); Western Australia (Colony)
→ → → → United States – United States of America; Capital: Washington D.C.	Widely recognized state. The following are territories of the United States of America: → → → → Arizona (Territory); → → → → Bajo Nuevo Bank (Uninhabited territory); → → → → Dakota (Territory); → → → → Idaho (Territory); → → → → Indian Territory (Territory); → → → → Johnston Atoll (Uninhabited territory); → → → → Kingman Reef (Uninhabited territory); → → → → Middlebrook Island (Uninhabited territory); → → → → Midway Atoll (Uninhabited territory); → → → → Montana (Territory); → → → → Navassa Island (Uninhabited territory); → → → → New Mexico (Territory); → → → → Quita Sueño Bank (Uninhabited territory); → → → → Roncador Bank (Uninhabited territory); → → → → Serrana Bank (Uninhabited territory); → → → → Serranilla Bank (Uninhabited territory); → → → → Swan Islands (Uninhabited territory); → (United States) Tientsin (Concession); → → → → Utah (Territory); → → → → Washington (Territory); → → → → Wyoming (Territory)
Upper Aulaqi Sultanate; Capital: Nişāb	Widely recognized state.
Upper Aulaqi Sheikhdom; Capital: Sa'id	Widely recognized state.
Upper Yafa – State of Upper Yafa; Capital: Mahjaba	Widely recognized state.
Uruguay – Eastern Republic of Uruguay; Capital: Montevideo	Widely recognized state.
=== V ===
→ Venezuela; Capital: Caracas: Republic of Venezuela (to 1864); United States of Venezuela (from 1864)	Widely recognized state.
=== W ===
Wadai – Wadai Empire; Capital: Abéché	Widely recognized state.
Wahidi Balhaf – Wahidi Sultanate of Balhaf; Capital: Balhaf	Widely recognized state.
Wahidi Bir Ali – Wahidi Sultanate of Bir Ali; Capital: Bi'r `Ali	Widely recognized state.
Wahidi Haban – Wahidi Sultanate of Haban; Capital: Habban	Widely recognized state.
Wajoq – Kingdom of Wajoq; Capital: Tosora	Widely recognized state.
Waldeck-Pyrmont – Principality of Waldeck and Pyrmont (to 1 July 1867); Capital: Altenburg	Widely recognized state to 1 July 1867. Member of the German Confederation. State of the North German Confederation from 1 July 1867.
Wituland – Witu Sultanate; Capital: Witu	Widely recognized state.
Wolaita – Kingdom of Wolaita; Capital: Lasho, Dalbo, Sodo	Widely recognized state.
Württemberg – Kingdom of Württemberg; Capital: Stuttgart	Widely recognized state.
=== Y ===
Yamma – Kingdom of Yamma; Capital: Fofa	Widely recognized state.
Yeke – Yeke Kingdom; Capital: Bunkeya	Widely recognized state.
=== Z ===
Zabarma – Zabarma Emirate (from 1860s); Capital: Not specified	Widely recognized state from 1860s.
Zanzibar – Sultanate of Zanzibar; Capital: Stone Town	Widely recognized state.
Zululand – Kingdom of Zulu; Capital: Bulawayo	Widely recognized state.
== States with limited sovereignty, recongition or independence ==
Aceh – Sultanate of Aceh; Capital: Kutaraja	Protectorate of the Ottoman Empire.
Alabama – Republic of Alabama (from 11 January to 4 February 1861); Capital: Montgomery	Unrecognized state, incorporated into the United States on 4 February 1861.
Araucanía and Patagonia – Kingdom of Araucanía and Patagonia (from 17 November 1860 to 5 January 1862); Capital: Perquenco	Unrecognized state. Claimed by Argentina and Chile.
Assiniboia – Provisional Government of Assiniboia (from 1869); Capital: Batoche	Unrecognized state, Provisional Government. Claimed by the Dominion of Canada.
Buenos Aires – State of Buenos Aires (to 12 December 1861); Capital: Perquenco	Unrecognized state. Rejoined Argentina on 12 December 1861.
Bulungan – Sultanate of Bulungan; Capital: Tanjung Palas	Vassal state of Sulu.
→ Canada – Dominion of Canada (from 1 July 1867); Capital: Ottawa	Autonomous Dominion of the United Kingdom. Canada was largely represented by the UK internationally and had little recognition as an independent state. Canada formed on the 1 July 1867 from the federation of 2 British territories and 1 British province into 4 territories. (Note: The colonies of New Brunswick, Nova Scotia and the Province of Canada which formed the provinces of New Brunswick, Nova Scotia, Ontario and Quebec.)
Champasak – Kingdom of Champasak; Capital: Champasak	Vassal state of Siam.
→ → → → → Confederate States – Confederate States of America (from 4 February 1861 to 5 May 1865); Capital: Greensboro	Unrecognized state. Dissolved on 5 May 1865.
Cuba (from October 10, 1868); Capital: Havana	Revolutionary state.
Dar al Kuti – Sultanate of Dar Al Kuti; Capital: N'Délé	Vassal state of Dar Runga.
Ezo (December 15, 168 until June 27, 1869); Capital: Hakodate	Separatist state.
Florida (from January 10 to February 4, 1861); Capital: Tallahassee	Separatist state. Became part of the Confederate States.
Ionian Islands – United States of the Ionian Islands (Until May 21, 1864); Capital: Corfu	British protectorate until May 21, 1864. Became part of Greece and the Ottoman Empire.
Kano – Emirate of Kano; Capital: Takai	Vassal state of the Sokoto Caliphate
Louisiana – Republic of Louisiana (from January 26 to February 4, 1861); Capital: Shreveport	Unrecognized successionist state. Joined the Confederate States.
Lower Yafa – Sultanate of Lower Yafa; Capital: Jaʿār	British protectorate.
Manitobah – Republic of Maintoba (from June 1867 to 1868); Capital: Portage la Prairie	Unrecognized state.
Mississippi – Republic of Mississippi (from January 9 to February 1, 1861); Capital: Jackson	Unrecognized successionist state. Became part of the Confederate States.
North Carolina – Republic of North Carolina (from May 20 to May 21, 1861); Capital: Raleigh	Unrecognized successionist state. Became part of the Confederate States.
Polish-Lithuanian-Ruthenian Commonwealth (from January 22, 1863, to June 18, 1864) Capital: Warsaw, Vilnius, Kyiv	Underground temporary government during the January Uprising.
Sikkim – Kingdom of Sikkim; Capital: Tumlong	De jure protectorate of Tibet under the Qing Dynasty. De facto British protectorate from March 1861.
→ South Carolina – Republic of South Carolina(from December 20, 1860, to February 8, 1861); Capital: Columbia	Unrecognized successionist state. Founding member of the Confederate States
Taiping Heavenly Kingdom - Heavenly Kingdom of Great Peace (to July 1864) Capital: Tianjing now Nanjing	Unrecognized successionist state which attempted to overthrow the Qing Dynasty during the Taiping Rebellion.
Tennessee - Republic of Tennessee (from June 8 to July 2, 1861); Capital: Nashville	Unrecognized successionist state. Became part of the Confederate States.
Texas – Republic of Texas (from February 1 to March 2, 1861); Capital: Austin	Unrecognized successionist state. Became part of the Confederate States.
Virginia – Republic of Virginia (from April 17 to May 7, 1861) (from April 17 to May 7, 1861); Capital: Richmond	Unrecognized successionist state. Became part of the Confederate States.
