= Ouedraogo =

Founder of the kingdom of Tenkodogo

Ouedraogo (also spelled Wedraogo or Ouidiraogo) was the son of Yennenga and progenitor of the Mossi Kingdoms. He founded the kingdom of Tenkodogo. His three sons were Rawa, Diaba Lompo, and Zoungourana.

== Etymology ==
His name is sometimes transcribed as Wed Raogo, Wedraogo or Ouidiraogo. It means “The Stallion” or “male horse” in the local language; which constitutes, among other things according to Jean-Louis Gouraud, a tribute to the animal that Yennenga was riding when she met his father. His people nickname him “Zungrana” (from “zugu”, head, and “rana”, master).

== Legendary History ==
The birth of Ouédraogo is linked to the legend of the warrior princess Yennenga. However, there are several versions; although all make him a descendant of Princess Yennenga, the latter is most often cited as his mother, or more rarely as his grandmother.

Eager to find love, Yennenga leaves her father's land by riding her stallion, who takes her hand and takes her to a hut deep in the woods, where an elephant hunter named Riale lives, or Raogo. Accepting the hospitality of the hunter, she united with him and gave birth to Ouédraogo, or to Massom according to the version which makes Ouedraogo the grandson of Yennenga. According to this last version, Massom gives birth to Ouédraogo with an unknown young woman, and dies shortly after the birth of his son.

Yennenga taught Ouedraogo the art of riding, hunting, and war, thanks to the use of the bow and the javelin. Riale teaches him how to hunt large animals, such as elephants, leopards and lions. This dual teaching allowed Ouedraogo to become an accomplished warrior.

On the initiative of his mother, he founded the kingdom of Mossis, of which Yennenga became queen regent. She suggests that he visit her grandfather, King Nedega of the Dagomba kingdom, when he is 15 years old, but reputed to be as strong as a 30-year-old man thanks to the training he has followed. He goes there accompanied by a small cavalry: Nedega (Gbewa) is so happy to see him that he provides him with 50 cows, 4 horses, and many other horsemen to join his army.

With this army, Ouedraogo united the different ethnic groups of the Bousansi, asserted his status as king, and founded the city of Tenkodogo.

He married Queen Pouiriketa, with whom he had three sons: Rawa, Diaba Lompo, and Zoungrana. He died of an arrow received in the chest during a battle against the Bousansi. His son Zoungrana succeeded him after his death, at the head of the kingdom of Tenkodogo.

== Legacy ==
Ouedraogo is considered the ancestor and founder of the Mossi people, who form the largest ethnic group in Burkina Faso. Instigator of a thousand-year-old empire, the hierarchy he established has not changed until today. His name is also one of the most common surnames in Burkina Faso.
