= Kango (disambiguation) =

Kango is a town in the Estuaire Province of Gabon.

Kango may also refer to:

- Kango, a rural land region north of the town Oudtshoorn in South Africa
- Kango people, Mbuty Pygmy people of the Ituri Rainforest, eastern Democratic Republic of the Congo
- Kango language, Bantu language spoken by some of the Kango people
- Kango language (Bas-Uélé District), Bantu language spoken in Bas-Uele District, northern Democratic Republic of the Congo
- Sino-Japanese vocabulary, also called by its Japanese name kango (漢語)
- Slang term for jackhammer
  - A brand of jackhammer made by the Milwaukee Electric Tool Corporation

People with the name Kango include:

- Mayuri Kango (born 1982), Indian actress from Aurangabad
- Naaba Kango (fl. 1754–1787), ruler of the Mossi state of Yatenga in present-day Burkina Faso; see List of rulers of the Mossi state of Yatenga

== See also ==
- Qango, acronym for Quasi-Autonomous Non-Governmental Organisation
