= Rawa (Mossi) =

Rawa (Ra-wa) was the developer of the government of Mossi. He was titled one of the masters of war for his accomplishments as a conqueror. A son of Ouedraogo, he is one of the three siblings of the founders of the Mossi and the first citizens of Mossi. While his younger brother, Zoungrana, overlooked the city of Tenkodogo (which was at the time the only city of the Mossi), and his other brother, Diaba Lompo, headed south and founded Gurmanche (of the Nungu kingdom), Rawa traveled north to establish the city of Zandana.
