= List of rulers of the Gurma Mossi state of Bilanga =

Territory located in present-day Burkina Faso.

Bilanbedo = Ruler

Tenure	Incumbent	Notes
Buricimba Dynasty
???? to ????	Tontuoriba, Bilanbedo	
???? to ????	Lisongi, Bilanbedo	
???? to ????	Baahamma, Bilanbedo	
???? to 1881	Labidiedo, Bilanbedo	
1881 to 1883	Haminari, Bilanbedo	
1883 to 1887	Yendabri, Bilanbedo	
1887 to 1919	Yaaparigu, Bilanbedo	
1919 to 1919	Boagri, Bilanbedo	
1919 to 1927	Hampandi, Bilanbedo	
1927 to 1970	Banyikuba, Bilanbedo	
1970 to 1970	Wuribiari, Bilanbedo	
1970 to present	Hamicuuri, Bilanbedo	

== Sources ==
- http://www.rulers.org/burktrad.html

== See also ==
- Burkina Faso
  - Mossi states
    - Rulers of the Mossi state of Gurunsi
    - Rulers of the Mossi state of Gwiriko
    - Rulers of the Mossi state of Liptako
    - Rulers of the Mossi state of Tenkodogo
    - Rulers of the Mossi state of Wogodogo
    - Rulers of the Mossi state of Yatenga
    - Rulers of the Gurma Mossi state of Bilayanga
    - Rulers of the Gurma Mossi state of Bongandini
    - Rulers of the Gurma Mossi state of Con
    - Rulers of the Gurma Mossi state of Macakoali
    - Rulers of the Gurma Mossi state of Nungu
    - Rulers of the Gurma Mossi state of Piela
- Lists of office-holders
