= List of rulers of the Mossi state of Tenkodogo =

This is a list of traditional rulers of the Mossi kingdom of Tenkodogo, which today is part of Burkina Faso. Tenkodogo today is now the seventh largest town and is the seat of the regional government of Boulgou Province. The traditional ruler is known as Tenkodogo-naaba.

Naaba = Ruler

Tenure	Incumbent	Notes
c.1120	Foundation of Tenkodogo	
???? to ????	Naaba Sapilem	
???? to ????	Naaba Nyambre	
???? to ????	Naaba Salma	
1894	Naaba Korongo	
???? to 1933	Naaba Koom	
1933 to 1957	Naaba Kiib Zoom Wobgo	
1957 to 2001	Naaba Tigre	
2001 to 2016	Naaba Saaga	
2016 to Present	Naaba Guiguem Polle	

== See also ==
- Burkina Faso
  - Mossi states
    - Rulers of the Mossi state of Gurunsi
    - Rulers of the Mossi state of Gwiriko
    - Rulers of the Mossi state of Liptako
    - Rulers of the Mossi state of Wogodogo
    - Rulers of the Mossi state of Yatenga
    - Rulers of the Gurma Mossi state of Bilanga
    - Rulers of the Gurma Mossi state of Bilayanga
    - Rulers of the Gurma Mossi state of Bongandini
    - Rulers of the Gurma Mossi state of Con
    - Rulers of the Gurma Mossi state of Macakoali
    - Rulers of the Gurma Mossi state of Nungu
    - Rulers of the Gurma Mossi state of Piela
- Lists of office-holders
