= List of rulers of the Mossi state of Yatenga =

This is a list of rulers of Yatenga, one of the Mossi Kingdoms located in present-day Burkina Faso.

The ruler held the title of Naaba, while some also held the title of Rima.

Name	Picture	Reign dates	Notes	Ref.
	Rawa	?	Established the city of Zandana.	
Originally called Rawatenga and Gitti and renamed Yatenga in 1333				
	Yadega	c. 1540–?		
	Yaulumfao	?		
	Kurita	?		
	Geda	?		
	Tonugum	?		
	Possinga	?		
	Nassege	?		
	Vante	?		
	Bonga	?		
	Sugunum	?		
	Kissun	?		
	Zangayella	?		
	Lanlassé	?		
	Nassodoba	?–c. 1650		
	Lammbwegha	c. 1650–?		
	Niago	?		
	Parima	?		
	Kumpaugum	?		
	Nabassere	?		
	Tusuru	?		
	Piga I or Piiyo I	?–1754		
	Kango	1754	Brother of Piiyo I. Exiled to Ségou by his cousin Wabgho.	
	Wabgho	1754–1757	Defeated and exiled by Kango.	
	Kango	1757–1787	Restored to the throne.	
	Rima Sagha or Saaga	1787–1803		
	Rima Kaogho or Koango	1803–1806		
	Rima Tougouri or Tuguri	1806–1822		
	Kom I or Koom I	1822–1825		
	Ragongo	1825–1831		
	Ridimba or Wobgo II	1831		
	Diogore or Nyambe Moogo	1831–1834		
	Rima Totebalobo or Totebaldo	1834–1850		
	Interregnum	1850–1851		
	Rima Yemde	1851–1877		
	Sanem or Sanum	1877–1879		
	Rima Noboga or Woboga	1879–1884		
	Piga II or Piiyo II	1884–1885		
	Rima Baogho or Boango	1885–May 1894		
Became part of French West Africa in 1895.				
	Boulli or Bulli	June 1894–27 January 1899		
	Sidiyete Wedraogo	November 1895–December 1896	In rebellion.	
	Ligidi	4 February 1899–12 February 1902		
	Kobgha	28 February 1902–2 September 1914		
Became part of French Upper Volta in 1919.				
	Tougouri II or Tigre	1914–1954	Son of Bulli.	
Became part of Republic of Upper Volta in 1958.				
	Sigiri	1954–4 May 1960	Son of Tigre.	
	Kom II or Koom II	May 1960–1975	Son of Sigiri.	
	Gigma	1975–1978		
Part of Burkina Faso since 1984.				
	Kom III or Koom III	1978–present		

== See also ==
- Burkina Faso
  - Mossi states
    - Rulers of the Mossi state of Gurunsi
    - Rulers of the Mossi state of Gwiriko
    - Rulers of the Mossi state of Liptako
    - Rulers of the Mossi state of Tenkodogo
    - Rulers of the Mossi state of Wogodogo
    - Rulers of the Gurma Mossi state of Bilanga
    - Rulers of the Gurma Mossi state of Bilayanga
    - Rulers of the Gurma Mossi state of Bongandini
    - Rulers of the Gurma Mossi state of Con
    - Rulers of the Gurma Mossi state of Macakoali
    - Rulers of the Gurma Mossi state of Nungu
    - Rulers of the Gurma Mossi state of Piela
- Lists of office-holders

== Bibliography ==
- Schemmel, B. "Burkinabe traditional polities".
- Stewart, John (2006). African States and Rulers (third ed.). London: McFarland & Company, Inc. ISBN 0-7864-2562-8.
