= List of rulers of the Gurma Mossi state of Macakoali =

This is a list of rulers of the Gurma Mossi state of Macakoali, located in present-day Burkina Faso.

== List of Rulers of the Gurma Mossi state of Macakoali ==
Territory located in present-day Burkina Faso.

Boopo = Ruler

Tenure	Incumbent	Notes
Buricimba Dynasty
???? to ????	Yembuaro, Boopo	
???? to ???	Yembrima, Boopo	
???? to ????	Baahamma, Boopo	
???? to ????	Yempaabu, Boopo	
???? to 1887	Labidiedo, Boopo	
1887 to 1896	Tintuoriba Adama, Boopo	
1896 to 1897	Hampanli, Boopo	
1897 to 1902	Huntani, Boopo	
1902 to 1906	Yenmiama, Boopo	
1906 to 1910	Haminari, Boopo	
1910 to 1932	Simadari, Boopo	
1932 to 1932	Hamicuuri, Boopo	
1932 to 1932	Yensongu, Boopo	
1932 to 1937	Wurabiari, Boopo	
1937 to 1943	Yaaparigu, Boopo	
1943 to 1945	Wuracaari, Boopo	
1945 to 1976	Yendieri, Boopo	
1976 to ????	..., Boopo	

== Sources ==
- http://www.rulers.org/burktrad.html

== See also ==
- Burkina Faso
  - Mossi states
    - Rulers of the Mossi state of Gurunsi
    - Rulers of the Mossi state of Gwiriko
    - Rulers of the Mossi state of Liptako
    - Rulers of the Mossi state of Tenkodogo
    - Rulers of the Mossi state of Wogodogo
    - Rulers of the Mossi state of Yatenga
    - Rulers of the Gurma Mossi state of Bilanga
    - Rulers of the Gurma Mossi state of Bilayanga
    - Rulers of the Gurma Mossi state of Bongandini
    - Rulers of the Gurma Mossi state of Con
    - Rulers of the Gurma Mossi state of Nungu
    - Rulers of the Gurma Mossi state of Piela
- Lists of office-holders
