= List of rulers of the Gurma Mossi state of Bilayanga =

This is a list of rulers of the Gurma Mossi state of Bilayanga, located in present-day Burkina Faso.

== List of rulers of the Gurma Mossi state of Bilayanga ==
Territory located in present-day Burkina Faso.

Tenure	Incumbent	Notes
Buricimba Dynasty
189? to ????	Yempaabu	
???? to ????	Yembuado	
???? to ????	Yenhamma	
???? to ????	Wurijuari	
???? to ????	Yentagma	

== Sources ==
- http://www.rulers.org/burktrad.html

== See also ==
- Burkina Faso
  - Mossi states
    - Rulers of the Mossi state of Gurunsi
    - Rulers of the Mossi state of Gwiriko
    - Rulers of the Mossi state of Liptako
    - Rulers of the Mossi state of Tenkodogo
    - Rulers of the Mossi state of Wogodogo
    - Rulers of the Mossi state of Yatenga
    - Rulers of the Gurma Mossi state of Bilanga
    - Rulers of the Gurma Mossi state of Bongandini
    - Rulers of the Gurma Mossi state of Con
    - Rulers of the Gurma Mossi state of Macakoali
    - Rulers of the Gurma Mossi state of Nungu
    - Rulers of the Gurma Mossi state of Piela
- Lists of office-holders
