= List of rulers of the Gurma Mossi state of Con =

Below is a list of rulers of the Gurma Mossi state of Con, a territory located in present-day Burkina Faso.

== List of rulers ==
Tenure	Incumbent	Notes
Buricimba Dynasty
????–????	Gmarba	
????–????	Wori	
????–????	Gamambu	
????–????	Pangangri	
????–????	Mabungu	
????–????	Bandigoo	
????–????	Wurbendi	
????–????	Yembuado	
????–????	Baalisongi	
????–????	Yenkoari	
????–1889	Yembrima	
1889–1892	Yensombu	
1892–1905	Baahamma	
1905–1942	Hamicuuri	
1942–1969	Yencabri	
1970–1972	Yentugri	
1972–present	Yentagma	

== See also ==
- Rulers of the Gurma Mossi state of Bilanga
- Rulers of the Gurma Mossi state of Bilayanga
- Rulers of the Gurma Mossi state of Bongandini
- Rulers of the Gurma Mossi state of Macakoali
- Rulers of the Gurma Mossi state of Nungu
- Rulers of the Gurma Mossi state of Piela
- Rulers of the Mossi state of Gurunsi
- Rulers of the Mossi state of Gwiriko
- Rulers of the Mossi state of Liptako
- Rulers of the Mossi state of Tenkodogo
- Rulers of the Mossi state of Wogodogo
- Rulers of the Mossi state of Yatenga
