= List of rulers of the Gurma Mossi state of Piela =

This is a list of rulers of the Gurma Mossi state of Piela, located in present-day Burkina Faso.

== List of Rulers of the Gurma Mossi state of Piela ==
Territory located in present-day Burkina Faso.

Pielabedo = Ruler

Tenure	Incumbent	Notes
Buricimba Dynasty
???? to ????	Baahamma, Pielabedo	
???? to ????	Yembuado, Pielabedo	
???? to ????	Yentema, Pielabedo	
???? to 1836	Yentagima, Pielabedo	
1836 to 1844	Yembrima, Pielabedo	
1844 to 1851	Yenkpaari, Pielabedo	
1851 to 1856	Yencaari, Pielabedo	
1856 to 1901	Yentandi, Pielabedo	
1901 to 1932	Kupiendieri, Pielabedo	
1932 to 1949	Yentugri, Pielabedo	
1949 to ????	Yensongu, Pielabedo	
???? to present	Hamipani, Pielabedo	

== Sources ==
- http://www.rulers.org/burktrad.html

== See also ==
- Burkina Faso
  - Mossi states
    - Rulers of the Mossi state of Gurunsi
    - Rulers of the Mossi state of Gwiriko
    - Rulers of the Mossi state of Liptako
    - Rulers of the Mossi state of Tenkodogo
    - Rulers of the Mossi state of Wogodogo
    - Rulers of the Mossi state of Yatenga
    - Rulers of the Gurma Mossi state of Bilanga
    - Rulers of the Gurma Mossi state of Bilayanga
    - Rulers of the Gurma Mossi state of Bongandini
    - Rulers of the Gurma Mossi state of Con
    - Rulers of the Gurma Mossi state of Macakoali
    - Rulers of the Gurma Mossi state of Nungu
- Lists of office-holders
