= List of rulers of the Gurma Mossi state of Bongandini =

Territory in present-day Burkina Faso.

| Tenure | Incumbent | Notes |
|---|---|---|
Buricimba Dynasty
| ???? to ???? | Bantia | |
| ???? to ???? | Yenkpaari | |
| ???? to 1897 | Yembrima | |
| 1897 to 1899 | Yentema | |
| 1899 to 1923 | Hampandi | |

== Sources ==
- https://www.rulers.org/burktrad.html

== See also ==
- Burkina Faso
  - Mossi states
    - Rulers of the Mossi state of Gurunsi
    - Rulers of the Mossi state of Gwiriko
    - Rulers of the Mossi state of Liptako
    - Rulers of the Mossi state of Tenkodogo
    - Rulers of the Mossi state of Wogodogo
    - Rulers of the Mossi state of Yatenga
    - Rulers of the Gurma Mossi state of Bilanga
    - Rulers of the Gurma Mossi state of Bilayanga
    - Rulers of the Gurma Mossi state of Con
    - Rulers of the Gurma Mossi state of Macakoali
    - Rulers of the Gurma Mossi state of Nungu
    - Rulers of the Gurma Mossi state of Piela
- Lists of office-holders
