= Zongoiri =

Zongoiri Natinga
- Location in Ghana
- Coordinates: 10°39′41″N 0°25′1″W
- Country: Ghana
- Region: Upper East Region
- District: Bawku West District

Zongoiri Natinga is a community in the Bawku West District of the Upper East Region of Ghana, to the northwest of a bend in the White Volta River.

The chiefdom of Zongoiri lies below the Gambaga Escarpment, bordered to the south by the White Volta River and to the west by the Red Volta River. The Zongoiri Waterfall at Kianga on the White Volta is a local tourist attraction. Zongoiri is home to sacred groves and to a water source that is believed to heal or prevent guinea worm infestation. Zongoiri was the place of refuge of Wobogo, last independent Mogho Naba of Mossi and ruler of Ouagadougou, who fled to Zongoiri in 1898 and died here in 1904.
