= List of rulers of the Mossi state of Gurunsi =

Territory located in present-day Burkina Faso.

Tenure	Incumbent	Notes
c.1870	Conquest by Zerma horsetraders	
c.1870 to c.1874	Alfa Hano	Capital moved from Tumu (present-day Ghana) to Sati (present-day Burkina Faso) (c.1886)
c.1874 to 1883	Gazari	
1883 to 1899	Babatu	
1894 to September 1897	Builsa Hamaria	In rebellion
1899	Gurunsi divided between French and British	

== Sources ==
- https://www.rulers.org/burktrad.html

== See also ==
- Burkina Faso
  - Mossi states
    - Rulers of the Mossi state of Gwiriko
    - Rulers of the Mossi state of Liptako
    - Rulers of the Mossi state of Tenkodogo
    - Rulers of the Mossi state of Wogodogo
    - Rulers of the Mossi state of Yatenga
    - Rulers of the Gurma Mossi state of Bilanga
    - Rulers of the Gurma Mossi state of Bilayanga
    - Rulers of the Gurma Mossi state of Bongandini
    - Rulers of the Gurma Mossi state of Con
    - Rulers of the Gurma Mossi state of Macakoali
    - Rulers of the Gurma Mossi state of Nungu
    - Rulers of the Gurma Mossi state of Piela
- Lists of office-holders
