= Naaba Kango =

Naaba Kango or Naba Kango (died 1787) is known as the greatest of the rulers of Yatenga, an early modern kingdom in present-day Burkina Faso.

In the first half of the 18th century, Yatenga had experienced a rapid succession of about a dozen rules in half a century as a result of weakening of the central authority of the kings (the title naba or naaba means "king") by the regional territorial chiefs (especially the nakomse, descendants of former rulers). After the death of his brother Naaba Piiyo in 1754, Kango became the naaba. This succession was disputed, however, and he was soon forced into exile to Ségou (Segu) by his cousin Naaba Wobgo. In 1757, he returned with Bambana troops wielding flintlocks, the first firearms ever recorded in Yatenga. This technological edge gave Kango the advantage, and he won the war.

He founded the new capital at Ouahigouya (Wahiguya) in 1780, and passed reforms to strengthen central royal authority at the expense of the nakomse. The nakomse exploited the series of succession disputes after Kango's death to weaken central authority again.
