= List of rulers of the Gurma Mossi state of Nungu =

List of Rulers of the Nungu Kingdom sometimes referred to as the Gurma Kingdom or Empire. The state was created by the Gurmanche people who are closely related to the Mossi people and was centred on the city of Fada N'Gourma.

This territory located in present-day Burkina Faso.

Nunbado = Ruler

Tenure	Incumbent	Notes
1204 to 1248	Diaba Lompo, Nunbado	
1248 to 1292	Tidarpo, Nunbado	
1292 to 1336	Untani, Nunbado	
1336 to 1380	Banydoba, Nunbado	
1380 to 1395	Labi Diebo, Nunbado	
1395 to 1425	Tenin, Nunbado	
1425 to 1470	Tokurma, Nunbado	
1470 to 1520	Gima, Nunbado	
1520 to 1553	Gori, Nunbado	
1553 to 1571	Bogora, Nunbado	
1571 to 1615	Kampadiboaghi, Nunbado	
1615 to 1659	Kampadi, Nunbado	
1659 to 1684	Tantiari, Nunbado	
1684 to 1709	Lissoangui, Nunbado	
Buricimba Dynasty
1709 to 1736?	Yendabri, Nunbado	
1736 to 1791	Yembrima, Nunbado	
1791 to 1822	Baahamma, Nunbado	
1822 to 1831	Yenhamma, Nunbado	
1831 to 1843	Yencirima, Nunbado	
1843 to 1846	Yencabri, Nunbado	
1846 to 1856	Yempabu, Nunbado	
1856 to 1883	Yempadigu, Nunbado	
1883 to 1892	Yentuguri, Nunbado	
1892 to 1911	Bancandi, Nunbado	
as French Protectorate
1911 to 1952	Simandari also called Kambambori, Nunbado	
1952 to 1 January 1954	Interregnum	
1 January 1954 to 26 November 1961	Hamicuuri or Hamtiuri, Nunbado	
26 November 1961 to 1973	Interregnum	
1973 to 1975	Yenmiama, Nunbado	
30 May 1975 to present	Yentangu, Nunbado	

== See also ==
- Burkina Faso
  - Mossi states
    - Rulers of the Mossi state of Gurunsi
    - Rulers of the Mossi state of Gwiriko
    - Rulers of the Mossi state of Liptako
    - Rulers of the Mossi state of Tenkodogo
    - Rulers of the Mossi state of Wogodogo
    - Rulers of the Mossi state of Yatenga
    - Rulers of the Gurma Mossi state of Bilanga
    - Rulers of the Gurma Mossi state of Bilayanga
    - Rulers of the Gurma Mossi state of Bongandini
    - Rulers of the Gurma Mossi state of Con
    - Rulers of the Gurma Mossi state of Macakoali
    - Rulers of the Gurma Mossi state of Piela
- Lists of office-holders
