= List of rulers of Liptako =

Liptako is a historic region in West Africa which included parts of modern-day Burkina Faso, Niger, and Mali. Control of the area changed hands between several regional ethnic groups, before the Gurma people established the kingdom of Koala. In the early 19th century, they were in turn overthrown by the Fula. Although a second kingdom of Koala was established to the south of the first, it never reclaimed significant regional power.

The Fula established Liptako as an Islamic state and an emirate of the Sokoto Caliphate. The emir of Liptako was its ruler until the French colonial occupation began in 1897, but retained political power until the position was dissolved by the post-colonial Upper Volta government in 1963. The emir now serves as a tribal chief on a more local scale.

== Early history ==
Information about the early history of the region that would become Liptako is scant, and no dates or records of rulership are known to exist. The area is believed to have changed hands between various ethnic groups, including the Dogon, the Kurumba, and possibly also the Bambara, Bissa, and Mossi.

Beginning in the late 15th century, the region was ruled by the Songhai as part of their empire. According to the Tarikh al-Sudan, the first king of the Songhai Empire, Sonni Ali died during an expedition in the area in 1492. The chronicle later names Arbinda-Farma Bokar, a son of a daughter of Askia Mohammad I, as having influence in the region in 1549–1550, (Note: 956 AH, according to the Islamic calendar) but does not ascribe any particular title to him. After the collapse of the Songhai Empire in 1591, the Kurumba probably reestablished control over the region.

== Kings of Koala ==
Around 1718, the Gurma people took control of the area from the Kurumba. Balibagini, a member of a cadet branch of the royal family of Nungu, established the first kingdom of Koala, taking the title bedo (pl. bediba). The community that served as the capital, also named Koala, was not the present-day town of that name, but a now-lost settlement in the west of the Liptako region. In establishing his kingdom, Balibagini warred with the Kurumba, pushing them west toward Aribinda, and with the Fula, who were forbidden from the new kingdom. When his brother, Udan Jari, died, Balibagini annexed the territory he had controlled as well. The territory he carved out was larger than later Liptako, stretching as far east as the Niger River.

Paamba, the fifth bedo, lifted Balibagini's edict prohibiting a Fula presence in Koala, setting the stage for the kingdom's eventual fall. During the reign of the eighth king, Yencaari, a dispute over inheritance and taxation in the Fula village of Selbo escalated a rebellion that ultimately forced the Gurma to flee to the south. Yencaari was killed during the conflict, with one local account suggesting that he was injured in battle, succumbing to his wounds in Bani after the Gurma exodus. Yencaari's son and heir-apparent, Umaru, was also either killed or disgraced in battle, although he may have led the Gurma south after their defeat.

First kingdom of Koala
No.	Bedo	Rule began (Note: The only significant effort to assign dates to the reigns of the bediba of Koala was made by French colonial administrator Paul Delmond in 1949. Delmond's king list differs from modern scholarship; his dates are included only for kings credibly considered equivalent to those on modern lists, and are considered approximate.)	Rule ended	Notes	Ref(s)
1	Balibagini	c. 1718	c. 1722		
2	Baadindiye	?	?		
3	Alfa (Note: Delmond offers 1734–1748 for Koro's reign and 1748–1763 for that of Alfa. More recent historians reverse the order of their rule; it is not clear whether the given regnal dates are accurate.)	?	?		
4	Koro	?	?		
5	Paamba	c. 1763	c. 1781		
6	Yembrima	?	?		
7	Baalisongi	?	?		
8	Yencaari	c. 1801	c. 1809		
9	Yencabri	?	?	It is uncertain whether Yencabri was ever officially king and, if so, whether he ruled before Yencaari or after him (during the rebellion).	

After a brief period of political turmoil, a survivor of the Koala ruling family, Kalinkuma, established a new town of Koala (at its present location) as the capital of a second kingdom of that name. Although the title of bedo was retained by the local traditional ruler even after the French occupation of the region, this second kingdom occupied a substantially smaller territory and had relatively little regional influence.

Second kingdom of Koala
No.	Bedo	Rule began	Rule ended	Notes	Ref(s)
10	Kalinkuma	?	?		
11	Yenbuado	1818	?	Under Yenbuado's rule, the second kingdom of Koala re-established rule over several other states acting as successors to the first kingdom.	
12	Yensombu	?	?		
13	Yentugri	?	?		
14	Lansongi	?	?		
15	Yencirima	?	?		
16	Yenahmma	?	1878		
17	Yenkuaga	c. 1878	1917		
18	Labidiedo	9 Feb 1918	18 Aug 1920		
19	Yenkpaari	31 Dec 1920	19 May 1937	Deported by the French colonial administration in 1941.	
20	Yempaabu	1 Dec 1941	1986		

=== Family tree ===
Family tree of the kings of Koala
- Foarimo
  - Udan Jari
  - I. Balibagini
    - III. Alfa
      - VII. Baalisongi
      - VIII. Yencaari
        - Umaru
      - IX. Yencabri
      - Dakisi
        - XIII. Yentugri
    - IV. Koro
    - V. Paamba
      - X. Kalinkuma
      - XI. Yenbuado
        - XVII. Yenkuaga
        - Beejieri
          - XVIII. Labdidiedo
      - Jafuuru
        - XVI. Yenhamma
          - XIX. Yenkpaari
          - Hunhambiri
            - XX. Yempaabu
    - VI. Yembrima
      - XII. Yensombu
      - Sagiba
        - XV. Yencirima
  - II. Baadindiye
    - Gmayiookan
      - XIV. Lansongi

== Emirs of Liptako ==
Some members of the traditionally pastoral Fula people began to settle in the Liptako area as early as the 15th century. In the early 19th century, escalating tensions between the Islamized Fula and the ruling Gurma led to a jihad, inspired by Usman dan Fodio and the Fulani War. This conflict destroyed Koala, largely pushed the Gurma out of the region, and established Fula rule. The newly-established Liptako was not fully independent, but rather an emirate of the Sokoto Caliphate, administered through an intermediate suzerain in Gwandu. Nevertheless, distance and local sentiment permitted Liptako's emir considerable local control. The emirship was a hereditary office with a traditional order of succession defined by custom. The right of succession belonged to a male-descent child of the earliest surviving familial generation; within a generation, children of older brothers had precedence over the children of younger brothers, and older brothers were preferred over their younger siblings. However, not all successions passed strictly in this manner.

The French occupied the Liptako capital of Dori on 30 April 1897, during the reign of Bokari Sori, but did not remove the emir, and largely permitted the precolonial political system to continue. In 1963, Maurice Yaméogo, the first president of the independent Republic of Upper Volta, formally disbanded the emirate. Nassourou continued to use the title, which remained a source of significant local respect and political influence. Currently, the emir of Liptako serves as a tribal chief for the Fula in Séno Province.

No.	Emir (Note: Fula names prior to 1960 are a series of patronymics, as in Arabic names. In the post-colonial era, the family of the emirs adopted Dicko as a surname. Burkinabé sources are not consistent about whether this should appear before or after the given name; in this article, this family name is always placed last. The orthography of the Fula language using the Latin script was not standardized until 1966, so the spelling of Liptako emirs prior to Nassourou Abdoulaye Dicko varies widely; for consistency, this article spells the names of rulers before 1966 in the forms used by Paul Irwin in his 1981 Liptako monograph. The names of rulers after 1966 are spelled as provided by Burkinabé media.)	Rule began (Note: Dates consisting of two years separated with a slash are based on the Fula calendar, a solar calendar that begins approximately in July, based on the start of the rainy season.)	Rule ended	Notes	Ref(s)
1	Braahima Seydu	1809/10	1816/17		
2	Saalu Hamma Seydu	1816/17	1832/33	Moved the capital from Wendu to Dori	
3	Sori Hamma	1832/33	1860/61		
4	Seeku Saalu	1860/61	1886/67	Seeku Saalu was among the most religious of the emirs, responsible for the construction of a mosque in Dori. He went blind during his time in office.	
5	Aamadu Iisa	1886/67	1890	The order of succession would traditionally have passed to Bokari Sori on the death of Seeku Saalu, but Aamadu Iisa, who had been the blind emir's confidant and was more politically powerful, assumed the throne instead.	
6	Bokari Sori	1890/91	1916/17	Due to a disputed succession, Bokari Sori may not have assumed the emirship until 1891/92, following a brief interregnum. Beginning in 1897, he ruled under French occupation.	
7	Bokari Aamadu Iisa (Baaba Geɗal)	1916/17	1918/19	Bokari opposed the presence of a French colonial military base in Dori. Colonial authorities accused him of conspiring with the Tuareg and deported him to Kidal, where he died within a year.	
8	Abdurramaan Aamadu Iisa	1918/19	3 Jun 1932	Abdurramaan was also deported by the French colonial government after accusations of abuses, including poisoning. He died less than a year later in Bilma, under suspicious circumstances.	
9	Abdullaahi (Sandu) Faaruuku	Sep 1932	1956/57	Sandu was acting emir for several months before his official appointment.	
10	Usmaan Bokari Sori	1956/57	1960	Usmaan died in Saudi Arabia while performing the Hajj.	
11	Nassourou Abdoulaye Dicko	1960	12 Nov 2010	The position of emir formally ceased to exist in 1963. After 1995, Nassourou became more active in local politics and use of the title increased.	
12	Ousmane Amirou Dicko	14 Dec 2010	present		

=== Pretenders ===
Following the death of Aamadu Iisa, a succession crisis occurred when Bokari Sori and Buhaari Iisa both claimed the emirship. In 1891, French military officer Parfait-Louis Monteil visited Liptako amidst the crisis and entered into a treaty with Buhaari's son Boubakar, believing Buhaari to be the eventual next emir. In 1895, colonial administrator Georges Destenave traveled to Liptako as part of an effort to confirm the status of French treaties with various local authorities and was informed that Buhaari was dead, having never become emir.

After Nassourou Abdoulaye Dicko's death in 2010, representatives of the family selected the late emir's brother, Boubacar Bassirou Dicko, to succeed him in a ceremony on 10 December 2010. Four days later, a council of Liptako village chiefs elected Nassourou's son, Ousame Amirou Dicko, to the same office. The disputed succession was eventually resolved in favor of Ousame.

=== Family tree ===
The emirs of Liptako claim descent from a semi-legendary migrant named Birmaari Saala Paate, who was said to have followed a wandering bull from Macina, in modern-day Mali, to Liptako.

Family tree of the emirs of Liptako
- Birmaari Saala Paate
  - Seydu
    - Hamma Seydu
      - II. Saalu Hamma Seydu
        - Iisa
          - V. Aamadu Iisa
            - VII. Bokari Aamadu Iisa
            - VIII. Abdurramaan Aamadu Iisa
          - Buhaari Iisa
            - Boubakar
        - IV. Seeku Saalu
      - III. Sori Hamma
        - VI. Bokari Sori
          - X. Usmaan Bokari Sori
            - XI. Nassourou Abdoulaye Dicko
              - XII. Ousmane Amirou Dicko
            - Boubacar Bassirou Dicko (Note: Although some Burkinabé sources described Boubacar as Nassourou's cousin, Ousmane confirmed in a 2014 interview that they are brothers.)
        - Faaruuku
          - IX. Abdullaahi Faaruuku
    - I. Braahima Seydu

== See also ==
- List of colonial governors of French Upper Volta
- List of heads of state of Burkina Faso
- List of heads of state of Mali
- List of heads of state of Niger

== Bibliography ==
- Hunwick, John O. (1999). Timbuktu and the Songhay Empire: Al-Sadi's Tarikh al-Sudan Down to 1613 and Other Contemporary Documents. Brill. ISBN 978-90-04-11207-0.
- Irwin, Paul (1981). Liptako Speaks: History from Oral Tradition in Africa. Princeton University Press. ISBN 978-0-691-05309-7.
- Lund, Christian (2001). "Politics in a Sahelian town: Dori and the art of alliance". In Benhaminsen, Tor A.; Lund, Christian (eds.). Politics, Property and Production in the West African Sahel: Understanding Natural Resources Management. Nordiska Afrikainstitutet. pp. 40–56. ISBN 978-91-7106-476-9.
- Madiéga, Y. Georges (1982). Contribution à L'Histoire Précoloniale du Gulma (Haute Volta). Franz Steiner Verlag. ISBN 978-3-515-03222-3.
- Parry, Clive, ed. (1978). Consolidated Treaty Series. Vol. 174. Oceana. ISBN 978-0-379-13000-3.
- Pillet-Schwartz, Anne-Marie (1999). "Approche régionale d'un îlot de «archipel peul» L'émirat du Liptako d'hier à aujourd'hui (Burkina Faso)". In Botte, Roger; Boutrais, Jean; Schmitz, Jean (eds.). Figures Peules (in French). Éditions Karthala. pp. 211–237. ISBN 978-2-86537-983-5.
- Pillet-Schwartz, Anne-Marie (2003). "Prélude à une approche de l'histoire coloniale de l'émirat du Liptako". Burkina Faso: Cent Ans D'Histoire, 1895–1995 (in French). Vol. 1. Éditions Karthala. pp. 897–912. ISBN 978-2-84586-431-3.
- Rupley, Lawrence; Bangali, Lamissa; Diamitani, Boureima (2013). Historical Dictionary of Burkina Faso (Third ed.). Scarecrow Press. ISBN 978-0-8108-6770-3.
