= States of the German Confederation =

Listing of the states of the German Confederation

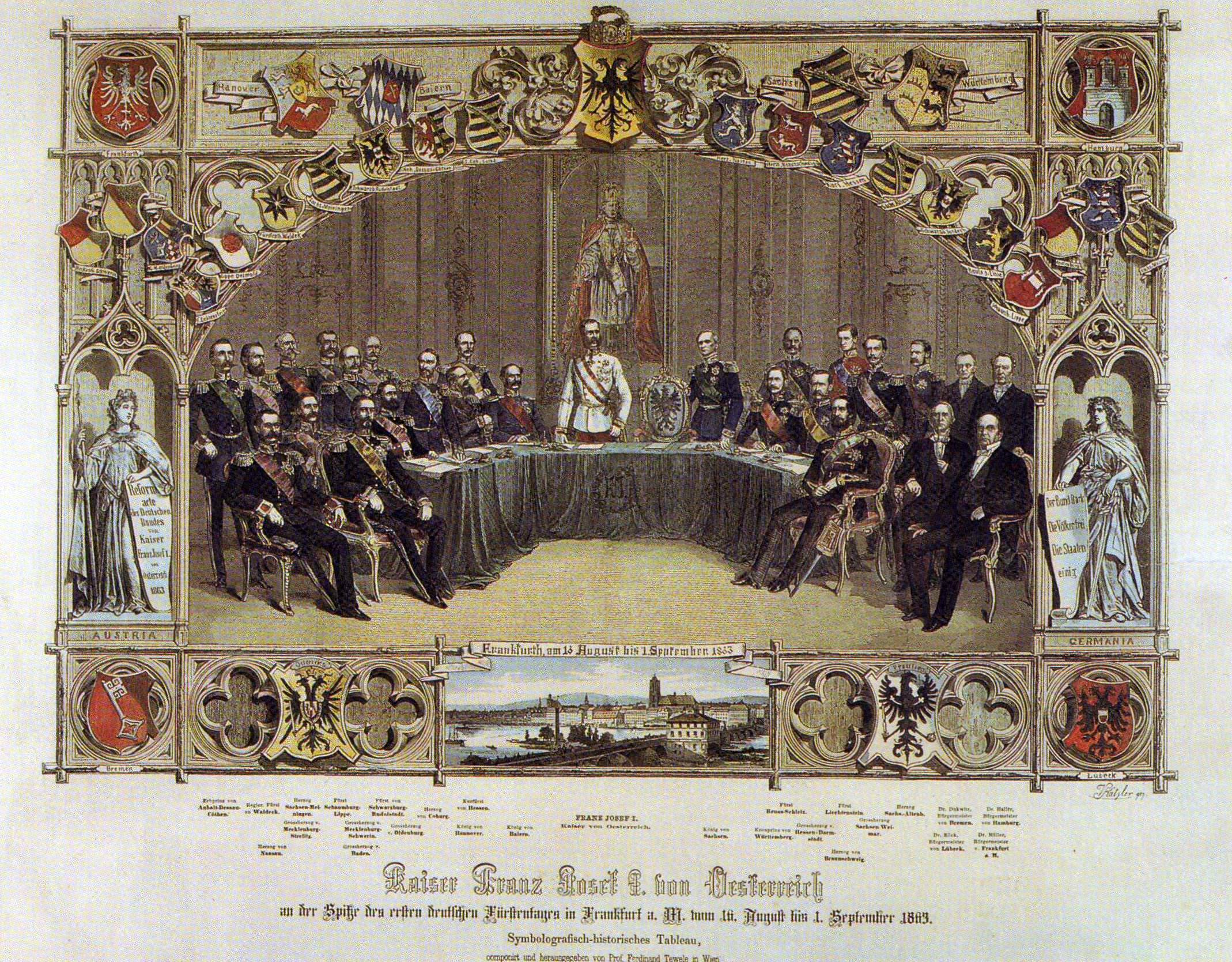
Allegory of the members of the German Confederation, led by the Kaiser Franz Joseph on the occasion of the Congress of Princes (1863)

The states of the German Confederation were member states of the German Confederation, from 20 June 1815 until 24 August 1866.

On the whole, its territory nearly coincided with that remaining in the Holy Roman Empire at the outbreak of the French Revolution, with the notable exception of Belgium. Except for Austria, Prussia, Holstein, and the western left bank of the Rhine (which France had annexed, with tiny Katzenelnbogen), the other member states (or their precursors) had been within Napoleon's Confederation of the Rhine.

Ruler	Name	Arms	Flag	Location
	Franz Joseph			Austrian Empire
	Wilhelm I of Prussia			Kingdom of Prussia
	George V of Hanover			Kingdom of Hannover
	Maximilian II of Bavaria			Kingdom of Bavaria
	John of Saxony			Kingdom of Saxony
	Charles I of Württemberg			Kingdom of Württemberg
	Friedrich I of Baden			Grand Duchy of Baden
	Peter II of Oldenburg			Grand Duchy of Oldenburg
	Charles Alexander of Saxe-Weimar-Eisenach			Grand Duchy of Saxe-Weimar-Eisenach
	Frederick Francis II of Mecklenburg-Schwerin			Grand Duchy of Mecklenburg-Schwerin
	Frederick Wilhelm II of Mecklenburg-Strelitz			Grand Duchy of Mecklenburg-Strelitz
	Louis III of Hesse			Grand Duchy of Hesse
	Frederick William of Hesse			Electorate of Hesse
	Adolphe of Nassau			Duchy of Nassau
	William of Brunswick			Duchy of Brunswick
	Ernest II of Saxe-Coburg-Gotha			Duchy of Saxe-Coburg-Gotha
	Bernhard II of Saxe-Meiningen			Duchy of Saxe-Meiningen
	Ernst I of Saxe-Altenburg			Duchy of Saxe-Altenburg
	Leopold IV of Anhalt			Duchy of Anhalt
	Leopold III of Lippe			Principality of Lippe
	Adolphus I of Schaumburg-Lippe			Principality of Schaumburg-Lippe
	Günther Friedrich Karl II of Schwarzburg-Sondershausen			Principality of Schwarzburg-Sondershausen
	Friedrich Günther of Schwarzburg-Rudolstadt			Principality of Schwarzburg-Rudolstadt
	George Victor of Waldeck and Pyrmont			Principality of Waldeck and Pyrmont
	Johann II of Liechtenstein			Principality of Liechtenstein
	Heinrich XXII of Reuss-Greiz			Principality of Reuss-Greiz
	Heinrich LXVII of Reuss-Gera			Principality of Reuss-Gera

- The Free Hanseatic City of Bremen (still a constitutive state of Germany)
- The Free City of Frankfurt upon Main
- The Free and Hanseatic City of Hamburg (still a constitutive state of Germany)
- The Free and Hanseatic City of Lübeck

The four free cities were republics by constitution, while all the others were monarchies, some constitutional and some absolutist.

The Duchy of Schleswig was never a member state. But Schleswig was traditionally connected to the duchies of Holstein and Lauenburg, which were member states. In 1848-51 (during the First Schleswig War), it was treated by the German states and the short-lived German Empire as a kind of member. In 1864, the Danish king transferred the three duchies to Austria and Prussia (after the Second Schleswig War).

== Sources and references ==
- Westermann, Großer Atlas zur Weltgeschichte (in German, detailed maps)
- WorldStatesmen
