= Zoungrana =

Zoungrana (also spelled Zoungourana or Zungrana; died 1495), was a Mossi ruler, either the first or second ruler of Tenkodogo. He was the third son of Ouedraogo.
