= Diaba Lompo =

Diaba Lompo was a 13th-century ruler, and the founder of the town of Fada N'Gourma, in Burkina Faso. His original name for Fada N'Gourma was Bingo. Fada N'Gourma is the easternmost major city in Burkina Faso. Nowadays it is nicknamed Fada.
