= Gwiriko =

Gwiriko Kingdom
- 1714–1897
- Capital: Bobo-Dioulasso
- Common languages: Dyula
- Religion: Islam
- Historical era: Postclassical Era
  - Established: 1714
  - Established independence from Kong Empire: 1740
  - French colonial control: 1897
Preceded by	Succeeded by
Kong Empire	French West Africa
- Today part of: Burkina Faso

The Gwiriko Kingdom (Dyula: Masaya Gwiriko), also spelled Gouiriko, was a kingdom in the 18th and 19th centuries in what is now part of present-day Burkina Faso around the watershed of the River Banifin. It was founded by Famagan Ouattara (Wattara) and lasted until French occupation in 1897. Its chief city was Bobo-Dioulasso.

== Historiography ==
The nature of the Gwiriko polity is debated by historians. Juula elders in the region do not retain a historical tradition of any kingdom of that name, yet since its inclusion in Dominique Traore's 1937 paper 'Notes sur le royaume mandingue de Bobo' it has appeared in numerous historians' accounts. The early history of this kingdom is also recorded in the Ghunja Chronicle (Kitab al-Ghunja).

The word "Gwiriko" and its variant "Gbirinko" mean "at the end of the long stage", or alternatively "beyond the forest", in the Dyula language. The term, therefore, may have been a term for the remote lands far from the center of Ouattara power in Kong rather than denoting a specific territory.

== History ==
In the early 18th century, Sékou Ouattara took control of the city of Kong and expanded his influence, creating the Kong Empire. In about 1714, Seku's brother Famagan Ouattara established the Kingdom of Gwiriko in the bend of the Mouhoun River, acting as a representative of Seku but with a high degree of independence. At Seku's death around 1740, Famagah refused to pay allegiance to Sekou Ouattara's sons and seized the area which included Tiefo, Dafin, and Bwamu. He allied with the Bobo-Juula, and established a state. His successors faced repeated revolts which were put down by violent repression.

After the succeeding leader, Diori Ouattara, died in 1839, the state collapsed, and the Tiefo, Bobo Joola, Bolon, and other peoples became independent. Bako Moru stemmed the collapse by allying with the Tiéfo and Bobo Joola. In a battle at Bléni in the 1860s, the army of faama Daula Traoré of Kenedougou was defeated and his son Tieba was captured and later sold as a slave.

Guimbe Ouattara (c 1836–1919), daughter of Diori Ouattara, was a noted leader in campaigns against the Kénédougou Kingdom and Noumoudara in this era.

During the reign of Ali Dyan (1854–1878) and his successor Kokoro Dyan, the central state lost control of the state and groups such as the Tyefo took control of the land. By the late 1800s, Gwiriko was pressed on many sides and in 1897, Pintieba Ouattara was installed to replace Tieba Ouattara by the French when Pintieba made a deal with French commandant Paul Caudrelier. Thereafter, the influence of the state quickly waned and while Pintieba and his successor Karamoko Ouattara held the title of King until 1915, by that time the state no longer existed.

== List of rulers ==
Tenure	Incumbent	Notes
1714	Foundation of Gwiriko state	
1714 to 1729	Famaghan Ouattara	Founded Gwiriko as a replica of the Kingdom of Kong. Relative of Sekou Ouattara, ruler of Kong. Seized Tiefo, Dafin, and Bwamu and allied with Bobo-Juula.
1729 to 1742	Famagan denn Tieba	
1742 to 1749	Kere Massa Ouattara	
1749 to 1809	Magan Wule Ouattara	
1809 to 1839	Dyori Ouattara	Son of Magan Wule
1839 to 1851	Bako Moru Ouattara	
1851 to 1854	Laganfyela Moru	
1854 to 1878	Ali Dyan	
1878 to 1885	Kokoroko Dyan	
1885 to 1892	Sabana	
1892 to 1897	Tyeba Ouattara "Nyandane"	Tyeba was replaced by distant relative Pintyeba by French in exchange for Pintyeba's cooperation in French interests.
1897 to 1909	Pintyeba Ouattara	Relatively powerless
1909 to 1915	Karamoko Ouattara	Held title, but state no longer existed

== See also ==
- Mossi states
- Kong Empire
- Guiriko Region
