= 1964 Panamanian general election =

General elections were held in Panama on 10 May 1964, electing both a new President of the Republic and a new National Assembly.

Seven candidates competed in the 1964 presidential elections, although only three were serious contenders. Marco Aurelio Robles, who had served as minister of the presidency in Roberto F. Chiari's cabinet, was the candidate of the National Opposition Union, comprising the PLN and 7 smaller parties. After lengthy backstage maneuvers, Robles was endorsed by the outgoing president. Juan de Arco Galindo, a former member of the National Assembly and public works minister and brother-in-law of former President Ernesto de la Guardia, was the candidate of the National Opposition Union coalition, comprising 6 parties headed by the CPN. Arnulfo Arias was supported by the PP, already the largest single party in the country.

According to Ian Gorvin, "PLN retained the presidency in 1964 when Robles won 134,627 votes compared with 123,186 for Arias, now candidate of the Panamanian Party. Arias maintained that the elections had been rigged and demanded a recount, but the National Elections Board upheld the result."

== Results ==
=== President ===
| Candidate | Party or alliance | | Votes | % |
|---|---|---|---|---|
| Marco Aurelio Robles | National Opposition Union | National Liberal Party | 48,574 | 15.31 |
| Marco Aurelio Robles | National Opposition Union | Republican Party | 32,445 | 10.23 |
| Marco Aurelio Robles | National Opposition Union | National Liberation Movement | 12,920 | 4.07 |
| Marco Aurelio Robles | National Opposition Union | Labor and Agrarian Party | 11,483 | 3.62 |
| Marco Aurelio Robles | National Opposition Union | Democratic Action Party | 10,975 | 3.46 |
| Marco Aurelio Robles | National Opposition Union | National Progressive Party | 9,800 | 3.09 |
| Marco Aurelio Robles | National Opposition Union | Nationalist Party | 2,803 | 0.88 |
| Marco Aurelio Robles | National Opposition Union | Revolutionary Isthmian Party | 933 | 0.29 |
| Marco Aurelio Robles | National Opposition Union | Total | 129,933 | 40.97 |
| Arnulfo Arias | Panameñista Party | | 119,201 | 37.58 |
| Juan de Arco Galindo | National Opposition Alliance | National Patriotic Coalition | 23,872 | 7.53 |
| Juan de Arco Galindo | National Opposition Alliance | Third Nationalist Party | 11,442 | 3.61 |
| Juan de Arco Galindo | National Opposition Alliance | Renewal Party | 4,218 | 1.33 |
| Juan de Arco Galindo | National Opposition Alliance | Liberal Civic Resistance Party | 4,096 | 1.29 |
| Juan de Arco Galindo | National Opposition Alliance | DIPAL Party | 3,046 | 0.96 |
| Juan de Arco Galindo | National Opposition Alliance | National Civic Party | 1,079 | 0.34 |
| Juan de Arco Galindo | National Opposition Alliance | Total | 47,753 | 15.06 |
| José Antonio Molino | Christian Democratic Party | | 9,681 | 3.05 |
| Florencio Harris | Socialist Party | | 4,374 | 1.38 |
| Norberto Navarro | Radical Action Party | | 3,708 | 1.17 |
| José de la Rosa Castillo | National Reformist Party | | 2,521 | 0.79 |
| Total | | | 317,171 | 100.00 |
| Valid votes | | | 317,171 | 97.17 |
| Invalid/blank votes | | | 9,230 | 2.83 |
| Total votes | | | 326,401 | 100.00 |
| Registered voters/turnout | | | 486,420 | 67.10 |
Source: Nohlen

=== National Assembly ===
| Party or alliance | | Seats |
|---|---|---|
| National Opposition Union | National Liberal Party | 8 |
| National Opposition Union | Republican Party | 4 |
| National Opposition Union | National Liberation Movement | 2 |
| National Opposition Union | Labor and Agrarian Party | 1 |
| National Opposition Union | Democratic Action Party | 1 |
| National Opposition Union | National Progressive Party | 2 |
| National Opposition Union | Nationalist Party | 0 |
| National Opposition Union | Revolutionary Isthmian Party | 0 |
| National Opposition Union | Total | 18 |
| Panameñista Party | | 12 |
| National Opposition Alliance (ANO) | National Patriotic Coalition | 3 |
| National Opposition Alliance (ANO) | Third Nationalist Party | 4 |
| National Opposition Alliance (ANO) | Liberal Civic Resistance Party | 0 |
| National Opposition Alliance (ANO) | Renewal Party | 1 |
| National Opposition Alliance (ANO) | DIPAL Party | 0 |
| National Opposition Alliance (ANO) | National Civic Party | 0 |
| National Opposition Alliance (ANO) | Total | 8 |
| Christian Democratic Party | | 1 |
| Socialist Party | | 1 |
| Radical Action Party | | 1 |
| National Reformist Party | | 1 |
| Total | | 42 |
Source: Nohlen

== Aftermath ==
"As the 1968 elections approached the opposition accused President Robles of unlawfully using his office to support the candidacy of David Samudio as his successor. The opposition parties held a majority in the legislature, which impeached Robles".

The National Assembly met in special session and appointed a commission to gather evidence. Robles, in turn, obtained a judgment from a Municipal Court that the Assembly was acting unconstitutionally. The National Assembly chose to ignore a stay order issued by the municipal court pending the reconvening of the Supreme Court on 1 April, and on 14 March it voted for impeachment (by 30 votes to 12). On 24 March, the National Assembly found Robles guilty and declared him deposed and replaced him with Max Delvalle, who being the senior vice-president was sworn in as President of the Republic. Robles and the National Guard ignored the proceedings, maintaining that they would abide by the decision of the Supreme Court when it reconvened. The Supreme Court, with only one dissenting vote, ruled the impeachment proceedings unconstitutional. But Delvalle denied its authority to overrule decisions of the legislature and continued to fill the presidency. The Electoral Tribunal subsequently ruled that thirty of the parliamentary deputies involved in the impeachment proceedings were ineligible for reelection. Robles, with the support of the National Guard, retained the presidency.
