= President of Panama =

Head of state and government

President of the Republic of Panama
- Presidente de la República de Panamá
- Presidential standard

- Coat of arms of Panama

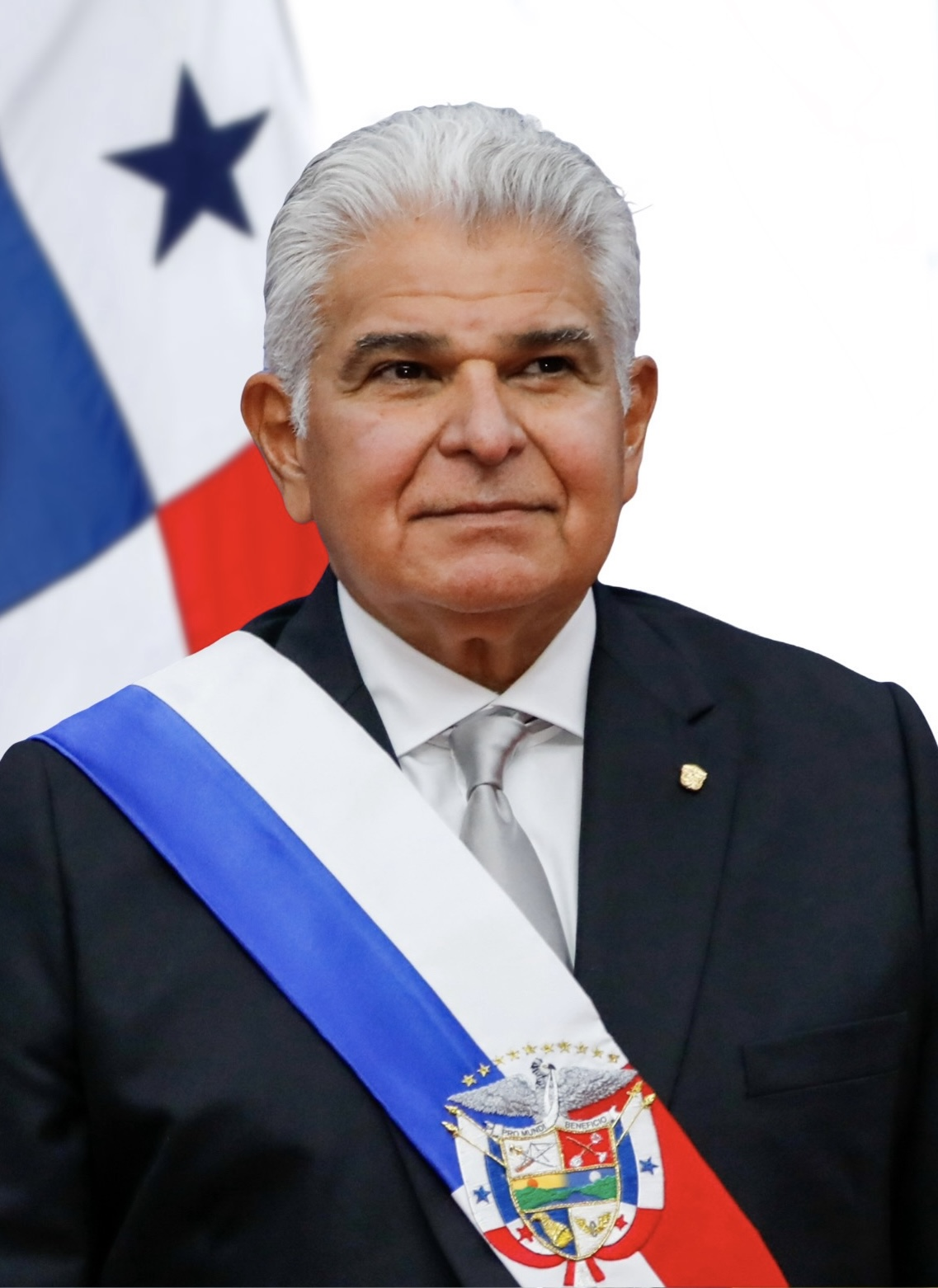
- Incumbent; José Raúl Mulino since 1 July 2024
- Executive branch of the Government of Panama
- Style: Mr./Madam President (Señor/a Presidente/a) (informal); The Most Excellent (Excelentísimo/a Señor/a) (diplomatic); His/Her Excellency (Su Excelencia) (diplomatic)
- Residence: Palacio de las Garzas
- Seat: Panama City
- Term length: Five years; renewable once non-consecutively
- Constituting instrument: Constitution of Panama (1972)
- Inaugural holder: Manuel Amador Guerrero
- Formation: February 20, 1904 (122 years ago)
- Deputy: Vice President of Panama
- Salary: US$7,000 monthly
- Website: www.presidencia.gob.pa (in Spanish)

This article lists the heads of state of Panama since the short-lived first independence from the Republic of New Granada in 1840 and the final secession from Colombia in 1903. Since 1904 the head of state of Panama has been the President of Panama.

== List of officeholders ==
Political parties

Conservative Party (PC)
National Liberal Party (PLN)
National Revolutionary Party (PNR)→Panameñista Party (PP)
Authentic Revolutionary Party (PPA)
National Patriotic Coalition (CPN)
Democratic Revolutionary Party (PRD)
Republican Party (PR)
Democratic Change (CD)
Realizing Goals (RM)

Other affiliations

Independent
Military (National Guard and Panama Defense Forces)

Status

Denotes acting or provisional president

Symbols

^{†} Died in office

=== Free State of the Isthmus (1840–1841) ===
No.	Portrait	President (Birth–Death)	Term of office			Title
No.	Portrait	President (Birth–Death)	Took office	Left office	Time in office	Title
1		Tomás de Herrera (1804–1854)	18 November 1840	8 June 1841	202 days	Superior Chief of State
(1)		Tomás de Herrera (1804–1854)	8 June 1841	31 December 1841	206 days	President

=== Republic of Panama (1903–present) ===
President of the Municipal Council of Panama and de facto President (1903)
No.	Portrait	Name (Birth–Death)	Term of office			Political Party
No.	Portrait	Name (Birth–Death)	Took office	Left office	Time in office	Political Party
3		Demetrio H. Brid (1859–1917)	3 November 1903	4 November 1903	1 day	PC

Members of the Provisional Government Junta (1903–1904)
No.	Portrait	Name (Birth–Death)	Term of office			Political Party
No.	Portrait	Name (Birth–Death)	Took office	Left office	Time in office	Political Party
4		José Agustín Arango (1841–1909)	4 November 1903	20 February 1904	108 days	PLN
5		Tomás Arias (1856–1932)	4 November 1903	20 February 1904	108 days	Independent
6		Federico Boyd (1851–1924)	4 November 1903	20 February 1904	108 days	PLN
7		Manuel Espinosa Batista (1857–1919)	9 November 1903	7 December 1903	28 days	PLN

==== Presidents of Panama (1904–present) ====
No.	Portrait	President (Birth–Death)	Elected	Term of office			Political Party
No.	Portrait	President (Birth–Death)	Elected	Took office	Left office	Time in office	Political Party
1		Manuel Amador Guerrero (1833–1909); First tenure	1904	20 February 1904	23 June 1907	3 years, 123 days	PC
2		José Domingo de Obaldía (1845–1910); First tenure	—	24 June 1907	27 December 1907	186 days	PLN
(1)		Manuel Amador Guerrero (1833–1909); Second tenure	—	29 December 1907	1 October 1908	277 days	PC
(2)		José Domingo de Obaldía (1845–1910); Second tenure	1908	1 October 1908	1 March 1910^{[†]}	1 year, 151 days	PLN
—		Carlos Antonio Mendoza (1856–1916); Acting president	—	1 March 1910	1 October 1910	214 days	PLN
—		Federico Boyd (1851–1924); Acting president	—	1 October 1910	5 October 1910	4 days	PLN
—		Pablo Arosemena (1836–1920); Acting president	—	5 October 1910	1 October 1912	1 year, 362 days	PLN
3		Belisario Porras Barahona (1856–1942); First tenure	1912	1 October 1912	1 October 1916	4 years	PLN
4		Ramón Maximiliano Valdés (1867–1918)	1916	1 October 1916	3 June 1918^{[†]}	1 year, 245 days	PLN
—		Ciro Luis Urriola (1863–1922); Acting president	—	3 June 1918	1 October 1918	120 days	PLN
—		Pedro Antonio Díaz (1852–1919); Acting president	—	1 October 1918	12 October 1918	11 days	PC
(3)		Belisario Porras Barahona (1856–1942); Second tenure	1918	12 October 1918	30 January 1920	1 year, 110 days	PLN
—		Ernesto Tisdel Lefevre (1876–1922); Acting president	—	30 January 1920	1 October 1920	245 days	PLN
(3)		Belisario Porras Barahona (1856–1942); Third tenure	1920	1 October 1920	1 October 1924	4 years	PLN
5		Rodolfo Chiari (1869–1937)	1924	1 October 1924	1 October 1928	4 years	PLN
6		Florencio Harmodio Arosemena (1872–1945)	1928	1 October 1928	3 January 1931 (Deposed in a coup)	2 years, 94 days	PLN
—		Harmodio Arias Madrid (1886–1962); Acting president	—	3 January 1931	16 January 1931	13 days	Independent
7		Ricardo Joaquín Alfaro Jované (1882–1971)	—	16 January 1931	5 June 1932	1 year, 141 days	PLN
8		Harmodio Arias Madrid (1886–1962)	1932	5 June 1932	1 October 1936	4 years, 118 days	PNR
9		Juan Demóstenes Arosemena (1879–1939)	1936	1 October 1936	16 December 1939^{[†]}	3 years, 76 days	PLN
—		Ezequiel Fernández (1886–1946); Acting president	—	16 December 1939	18 December 1939	2 days	PNR
—		Augusto Samuel Boyd (1879–1957); Acting president	—	18 December 1939	1 October 1940	288 days	PNR
10		Arnulfo Arias (1901–1988); First tenure	1940	1 October 1940	9 October 1941 (Deposed in a coup)	1 year, 8 days	PNR
11		Ricardo Adolfo de la Guardia Arango (1899–1969)	—	9 October 1941	15 June 1945	3 years, 249 days	Independent
—		Enrique Adolfo Jiménez (1888–1970); Provisional president	1945	15 June 1945	7 August 1948	3 years, 53 days	PLN
12		Domingo Díaz Arosemena (1875–1949)	1948	7 August 1948	28 July 1949 (Resigned)	355 days	PLN
13		Daniel Chanis Pinzón (1892–1961)	—	28 July 1949	20 November 1949	115 days	PLN
14		Roberto Francisco Chiari Remón (1905–1981); First tenure	—	20 November 1949	24 November 1949	4 days	PLN
(10)		Arnulfo Arias (1901–1988); Second tenure	—	24 November 1949	9 May 1951 (Deposed in a coup)	1 year, 166 days	PP
15		Alcibíades Arosemena (1883–1958)	—	9 May 1951	1 October 1952	1 year, 145 days	PPA
16		José Antonio Remón Cantera (1908–1955)	1952	1 October 1952	2 January 1955 (Assassinated)	2 years, 93 days	CPN
17		José Ramón Guizado (1899–1964)	—	2 January 1955	29 March 1955	86 days	CPN
18		Ricardo Arias (1912–1993)	—	29 March 1955	1 October 1956	1 year, 186 days	CPN
19		Ernesto de la Guardia (1904–1983)	1956	1 October 1956	1 October 1960	4 years	CPN
(14)		Roberto Francisco Chiari Remón (1905–1981); Second tenure	1960	1 October 1960	17 March 1963	2 years, 167 days	PLN
—		Bernardino González Ruiz (1911–2012); Acting president	—	17 March 1963	23 March 1963	6 days	PAD
(14)		Roberto Francisco Chiari Remón (1905–1981); Third tenure	—	23 March 1963	1 October 1964	1 year, 192 days	PLN
20		Marco Aurelio Robles (1908–1990)	1964	1 October 1964	1 October 1968	4 years	PLN
(10)		Arnulfo Arias (1901–1988); Third tenure	1968	1 October 1968	11 October 1968 (Deposed in a coup)	10 days	PP
—		José María Pinilla Fábrega (1919–1979); Chairman of the Provisional Junta; Ruled jointly with Bolívar Urrutia Parrilla	—	11 October 1968	18 December 1969	1 year, 68 days	National Guard
21		Colonel; Bolívar Urrutia Parrilla (1918–2005); Ruled jointly with José María Pinilla Fábrega	—	11 October 1968	18 December 1969	1 year, 68 days	National Guard
—		Demetrio B. Lakas (1925–1999); Chairman of the Provisional Junta from 1969 to 1972	—	19 December 1969	11 October 1972	2 years, 297 days	Independent
22		Demetrio B. Lakas (1925–1999); Chairman of the Provisional Junta from 1969 to 1972	1972	11 October 1972	11 October 1978	6 years	Independent
23		Arístides Royo (born 1940)	1978	11 October 1978	31 July 1982	3 years, 293 days	Independent (until March 1979)
		Arístides Royo (born 1940)	—	11 October 1978	31 July 1982	3 years, 293 days	PRD
24		Ricardo de la Espriella (born 1934)	—	31 July 1982	13 February 1984	1 year, 197 days	PRD
25		Jorge Illueca (1918–2012)	—	13 February 1984	11 October 1984	241 days	Independent
26		Nicolás Ardito Barletta Vallarino (born 1938)	1984	11 October 1984	28 September 1985	352 days	PRD
—		Eric Arturo Delvalle (1937–2015); Acting president	—	28 September 1985	26 February 1988	2 years, 151 days	PR
—		Manuel Solís Palma (1917–2009); Acting president	—	26 February 1988	1 September 1989	1 year, 187 days	PRD
—		Francisco Rodríguez (born 1938); Provisional president	—	1 September 1989	20 December 1989 (Deposed in the US invasion)	110 days	PRD
27		Guillermo Endara (1936–2009)	1989	20 December 1989	1 September 1994	4 years, 255 days	PP
28		Ernesto Pérez Balladares (born 1946)	1994	1 September 1994	1 September 1999	5 years	PRD
29		Mireya Moscoso (born 1946)	1999	1 September 1999	1 September 2004	5 years	PP
30		Martín Torrijos (born 1963)	2004	1 September 2004	1 July 2009	4 years, 303 days	PRD
31		Ricardo Martinelli (born 1952)	2009	1 July 2009	1 July 2014	5 years	CD
32		Juan Carlos Varela (born 1963)	2014	1 July 2014	1 July 2019	5 years	PP
33		Laurentino Cortizo (born 1953)	2019	1 July 2019	1 July 2024	5 years	PRD
34		José Raúl Mulino (born 1959)	2024	1 July 2024	Incumbent (Term ends on 1 July 2029)	2 years, 144 days	RM

==== Military dictators of Panama (1968–1989) ====
From 1968 to 1989 a military junta exerted a dictatorship over the country and nominated the president, who himself held little power. The following individuals were leaders of the junta.

No.	Portrait	Name (Birth–Death)	Term of office			Military affiliation	Notes
No.	Portrait	Name (Birth–Death)	Took office	Left office	Time in office	Military affiliation	Notes
1		Brigadier-General; Omar Torrijos (1929–1981)	11 October 1968	31 July 1981^{[†]}	12 years, 293 days	National Guard	Assumed power in the 1968 coup d'état. Styled as Maximum Leader of the Panamanian Revolution from 11 October 1968. Killed in an air crash.
2		Colonel; Rubén Darío Paredes (born 1933)	3 March 1982	12 August 1983	1 year, 162 days	National Guard	
3		General; Manuel Noriega (1934–2017)	12 August 1983	20 December 1989	6 years, 130 days	National Guard	Styled as Maximum Leader of the National Liberation from 15 December 1989. Deposed in the US invasion.
3		General; Manuel Noriega (1934–2017)	12 August 1983	20 December 1989	6 years, 130 days	Panama Defense Forces (from 29 September 1983.)	Styled as Maximum Leader of the National Liberation from 15 December 1989. Deposed in the US invasion.

== Latest election ==
Candidate	Party or alliance		Votes	%
José Raúl Mulino	Realizing Goals–Alliance	Realizing Goals	668,527	29.39
José Raúl Mulino	Realizing Goals–Alliance	Alliance Party	110,245	4.85
José Raúl Mulino	Realizing Goals–Alliance	Total	778,772	34.23
Ricardo Lombana	Another Way Movement		559,432	24.59
Martín Torrijos	People's Party		364,576	16.03
Rómulo Roux	For a Better Panama	Democratic Change	138,274	6.08
Rómulo Roux	For a Better Panama	Panameñista Party	120,544	5.30
Rómulo Roux	For a Better Panama	Total	258,818	11.38
Zulay Rodríguez	Independent		150,338	6.61
José Gabriel Carrizo	Vamos con todo Panamá	Democratic Revolutionary Party	126,454	5.56
José Gabriel Carrizo	Vamos con todo Panamá	Nationalist Republican Liberal Movement	7,337	0.32
José Gabriel Carrizo	Vamos con todo Panamá	Total	133,791	5.88
Maribel Gordón	Independent		24,531	1.08
Melitón Arrocha	Independent	Independent Social Alternative Party	2,442	0.11
Melitón Arrocha	Independent	Independent	2,218	0.10
Melitón Arrocha	Independent	Total	4,660	0.20
Total			2,274,918	100.00
Valid votes			2,274,918	97.53
Invalid votes			38,544	1.65
Blank votes			19,101	0.82
Total votes			2,332,563	100.00
Registered voters/turnout			3,004,083	77.65
Source: Tribunal Electoral

== See also ==
- Politics of Panama
- List of political parties in Panama
- History of Panama
