= 1952 Panamanian general election =

General elections were held in Panama on 11 May 1952, electing both a new President of the Republic and a new National Assembly.

A temporary shift in power from the civilian aristocracy to the National Police occurred immediately after World War II. Between 1948 and 1952, National Police Commander José Antonio Remón Cantera installed and removed presidents with unencumbered ease. Remón increased salaries and fringe benefits for his forces and modernized training methods and equipment; in effect, he transformed the National Police from a police into a paramilitary force. From several existing parties and factions, José Antonio Remón Cantera also organized the National Patriotic Coalition (CPN). He ran successfully as its candidate for the presidency in 1952.

== Results ==
=== President ===
Candidate	Party or alliance		Votes	%
José Antonio Remón Cantera	National Patriotic Coalition	Renewal Party	39,918	18.72
José Antonio Remón Cantera	National Patriotic Coalition	Liberal Party	33,697	15.80
José Antonio Remón Cantera	National Patriotic Coalition	National Revolutionary Party	28,221	13.23
José Antonio Remón Cantera	National Patriotic Coalition	Authentic Revolutionary Party	20,837	9.77
José Antonio Remón Cantera	National Patriotic Coalition	Popular Union Party	10,552	4.95
José Antonio Remón Cantera	National Patriotic Coalition	Total	133,225	62.46
Roberto Francisco Chiari Remón	Civic Alliance	National Liberal Party	78,094	36.61
Roberto Francisco Chiari Remón	Civic Alliance	Patriotic Front	78,094	36.61
Roberto Francisco Chiari Remón	Civic Alliance	Socialist Party	78,094	36.61
Roberto Francisco Chiari Remón	Civic Alliance	Independent Revolutionary Party	78,094	36.61
Pedro Moreno Correa	Conservative Party		1,967	0.92
Total			213,286	100.00
Valid votes			213,286	91.99
Invalid/blank votes			18,562	8.01
Total votes			231,848	100.00
Registered voters/turnout			343,353	67.52
Source: Conte-Porras

=== Parliament ===
Party or alliance		Votes	%	Seats
National Patriotic Coalition	Renewal Party			11
National Patriotic Coalition	Liberal Party			11
National Patriotic Coalition	National Revolutionary Party			8
National Patriotic Coalition	Authentic Revolutionary Party			5
National Patriotic Coalition	Popular Union Party			4
National Patriotic Coalition	Total			39
Civic Alliance	National Liberal Party			10
Civic Alliance	Patriotic Front			1
Civic Alliance	Socialist Party			1
Civic Alliance	Independent Revolutionary Party			2
Civic Alliance	Total			14
Conservative Party				0
Total				53
Registered voters/turnout		343,353	–	
Source: Political Handbook of the World

== Aftermath ==
Remón followed national tradition by enriching himself through political office. He broke with tradition, however, by promoting social reform and economic development. His agricultural and industrial programs temporarily reduced the country's overwhelming economic dependence on the canal and the zone.

The 1953 electoral reform law in effect reduced the field of political parties to lineal descendants of the old Liberals and Conservatives. The government had required parties to enroll 45,000 members to receive official recognition.

Remón's reformist regime was short-lived, however. On 2 January 1955 he was machine-gunned to death at the racetrack outside Panama City. On 14 January the First Vice-President, José Ramón Guizado, was impeached for the crime and jailed, but he was never tried, and the motivation for his alleged act remained unclear. Some investigators believed that the impeachment of Guizado was a smokescreen to distract attention from others implicated in the assassination, including United States organized crime figure Lucky Luciano, dissident police officers, and both Arias families. The Second Vice-President, Ricardo Arias Espinosa (of the aristocratic Arias family), served out the remainder of the presidential term and dismantled many of Remón's reforms.
