= History of Panama (1904–1964) =

Panama is a transcontinental country spanning the southern part of North America and the northern part of South America.

== Prelude to 1904 ==
Explored and settled by the Spanish in the 16th century, Panama broke from the Spanish Empire in 1821. Shortly after declaring independence from Spain, it chose to exist as the Department of the Isthmus within the Republic of Gran Colombia, which had been created in 1819 as a union of Nueva Granada with the precursor of today's Ecuador and with the precursor of today's Venezuela. Over the next 90 years, political differences between supporters of federalism and centralism, as well as regional tensions and the occasional civil war, would steadily change the geo-political landscape of the region. Gran Colombia dissolved in 1831, with Panama and Nueva Granada choosing to remain joined, as the Republic of New Granada. This smaller republic was transformed in 1858 to the Granadine Confederation, thru a constitutional change that decentralized more aspects of governance, giving Panama (and the other constituent states) more control of their regions. The Granadine Confederation was replaced by the United States of Colombia, through another constitutional change in 1863, further decentralizing governance to nine "sovereign states”. In 1886, following further internal conflicts, the United States of Colombia was replaced by the more centralist Republic of Colombia. On 3 November 1903, following a series of disagreements between Panamanian groups and the Senate of the Republic regarding efforts to construct a canal, the separation of Panama from Colombia took place, with Panama declaring itself the Republic of Panama. On 18 November 1903, the Hay–Bunau-Varilla Treaty, regarding the canal, was signed by Panama and the United States.

== Organizing the new republic ==
The provisional governing junta, selected when independence was declared, governed the new state until a constitution was adopted in 1904. Under its terms, Manuel Amador Guerrero became Panama's first president.

The constitution was modeled, for the most part, after that of the United States, calling for separation of powers and direct elections for the presidency and the legislature, the National Assembly. The assembly, however, elected three persons to stand in the line of succession to the presidency. This provision remained in effect until 1946, when a new constitution provided for direct election of the vice president. The new republic was unitary; municipalities were to elect their own officials, but provincial authorities were to be appointed by the central government. The most controversial provision of the constitution was that which gave the United States the right to intervene to guarantee Panamanian sovereignty and to preserve order.

A two-party system of Liberals and Conservatives was inherited from Colombia, but the party labels had even less precise or ideological meaning in Panama than they had in the larger country. By the early 1920s, most of the Conservative leaders of the independence generation had died without leaving political heirs. Thus, cleavages in the Liberal Party led to a new system of personalistic parties in shifting coalitions, none of which enjoyed a mass base. Politics remained the exclusive preserve of the oligarchy, which tended to be composed of a few wealthy, white families.

Having successfully severed their ties with Colombia, the secessionists of Panama's central government were soon faced with a secessionist problem of their own. The Guna of the San Blas Islands were unwilling to accept the authority of Panama, just as they had been unwilling to accept the authority of Colombia or Spain. The Panamanian government exercised no administrative control over the islands until 1915, when a departmental government was established; its main office was in El Porvenir. At that time, forces of the Colonial Police, composed of blacks, were stationed on several islands. Their presence, along with a number of other factors, led to a revolt in 1925.

In 1903 on the island of Narganá, Charlie Robinson was elected chief. Having spent many years on a West Indian ship, he began a "civilizing" program. His cause was later taken up by a number of young men who had been educated in the cities on the mainland. These Young Turks advocated forcibly removing nose rings, substituting dresses for molas, and establishing dance halls like those in the cities. They were actively supported by the police, who arrested men who did not send their daughters to the dance hall; the police also allegedly raped some of the Indian women. By 1925 hatred for these modernizers and for the police was intense throughout the San Blas Islands.

The situation was further complicated by the factionalism that resulted when Panama separated from Colombia. The leader of one of these factions, Simral Coleman, with the help of a sympathetic American explorer, Richard Marsh, drew up a "declaration of independence" for the Guna, and on February 25, 1925, the rebellion was underway. During the course of the rebellion, about twenty members of the police were killed. A few days later a United States cruiser appeared; with United States diplomatic and naval officials serving as intermediaries, a peace treaty was concluded. The most important outcome of this rebellion against Panama was a treaty that in effect recognized San Blas as a semiautonomous territory.

== United States intervention and strained relations ==
In the very first year of the Hay-Bunau-Varilla Treaty, dissension had already arisen over the sovereignty issue. Acting on an understanding of its rights, the United States had applied special regulations to maritime traffic at the ports of entry to the canal and had established its own customs, tariffs, and postal services in the zone. These measures were opposed by the Panamanian government.

Mounting friction finally led Roosevelt to dispatch Secretary of War William Howard Taft to Panama in November 1904. His visit resulted in a compromise agreement, whereby the United States retained control of the ports of Ancón and Cristóbal, but their facilities might be used by any ships entering Panama City and Colón. The agreement also involved a reciprocal reduction of tariffs and the free passage of persons and goods from the Canal Zone into the republic. Compromises were reached in other areas, and both sides emerged with most of their grievances blunted if not wholly resolved.

Before the first year of independence had passed, the intervention issue also complicated relations. Threats to constitutional government in the republic by a Panamanian military leader, General Esteban Huertas, had resulted, at the suggestion of the United States diplomatic mission, in disbanding the Panamanian army in 1904. The army was replaced by the National Police, whose mission was to carry out ordinary police work. By 1920 the United States had intervened four times in the civil life of the republic. These interventions involved little military conflict and were, with one exception, at the request of one Panamanian faction or another.

The internal dynamics of Panamanian politics encouraged appeals to the United States by any currently disgruntled faction for intervention to secure its allegedly infringed rights. United States diplomatic personnel in Panama also served as advisers to Panamanian officials, a policy resented by nationalists. In 1921 the issue of intervention was formally raised by the republic's government. When asked for a definitive, written interpretation of the pertinent treaty clauses, Secretary of State Charles Evans Hughes pointed to inherent difficulties and explained that the main objectives of the United States were to act against any threat to the Canal Zone or the lives and holdings of non-Panamanians in the two major cities.

Actual intervention took several forms. United States officials supervised elections at the request of incumbent governments. To protect lives of United States citizens and property in Chiriquí Province, an occupation force was stationed there for two years over the protests of Panamanians who contended that the right of occupation could apply only to the two major cities. United States involvement in the 1925 rent riots in Panama City was also widely resented. After violent disturbances during October, and at the request of the Panamanian government, 600 troops with fixed bayonets dispersed mobs threatening to seize the city.

At the end of the 1920s, traditional United States policy toward intervention was revised. In 1928 Secretary of State Frank B. Kellogg reiterated his government's refusal to countenance illegal changes of government. In the same year, however, Washington declined to intervene during the national elections that placed Florencio H. Arosemena in office. The Arosemena government was noted for its corruption. But when a coup d'état was undertaken to unseat Arosemena, the United States once again declined to intervene. Though no official pronouncement of a shift in policy had been made, the 1931 coup d'état—the first successful one in the republic's history—marked a watershed in the history of United States intervention.

Meanwhile, popular sentiment on both sides calling for revisions to the treaty had resulted in the Kellogg-Alfaro Treaty of 1925. The United States in this instrument agreed to restrictions on private commercial operations in the Canal Zone and also agreed to a tightening of the regulations pertaining to the official commissaries. At the same time, however, the United States gained several concessions involving security. Panama agreed to automatic participation in any war involving the United States and to United States supervision and control of military operations within the republic. These and other clauses aroused strong opposition and, amid considerable tumult, the National Assembly on January 26, 1927, refused to consider the draft treaty.

The abortive Kellogg-Alfaro Treaty involved the two countries in a critical incident with the League of Nations. During the fall of 1927, the League Assembly insisted that Panama could not legally participate in the proposed arrangement with the United States. The assembly argued that an automatic declaration of war would violate Panama's obligations under the League Covenant to wait three months for an arbitral decision on any dispute before resorting to war. The discussion was largely academic inasmuch as the treaty had already been effectively rejected, but Panama proposed that the dispute over sovereignty in the Canal Zone be submitted to international arbitration. The United States denied that any issue needed arbitration.

== A new accommodation ==
In the late 1920s, United States policymakers noted that nationalist aspirations in Latin America were not producing desired results. United States occupation of Nicaragua, Haiti, and the Dominican Republic had not spawned exemplary political systems, nor had widespread intervention resulted in a receptive attitude toward United States trade and investments. As the subversive activities of Latin American Nazi and Fascist sympathizers gained momentum in the 1930s, the United States became concerned about the need for hemispheric solidarity.

The gradual reversal of United States policy was heralded in 1928 when the Clark Memorandum was issued, formally disavowing the Roosevelt Corollary to the Monroe Doctrine. In his inaugural address in 1933, President Franklin D. Roosevelt enunciated the Good Neighbor Policy. That same year, at the Seventh Inter-American Conference in Montevideo, the United States expressed a qualified acceptance of the principle of nonintervention; in 1936 the United States approved this principle without reservation.

In the 1930s, Panama, like most countries of the Western world, was suffering economic depression. Until that time, Panamanian politics had remained a competition among individuals and families within a gentleman's club—specifically, the Union Club of Panama City. The first exception to this succession was Harmodio Arias Madrid (unrelated to the aristocratic family of the same name) who was elected to the presidency in 1932. A mestizo from a poor family in the provinces, he had attended the London School of Economics and had gained prominence through writing a book that attacked the Monroe Doctrine.

Harmodio and his brother Arnulfo, a Harvard Medical School graduate, entered the political arena through a movement known as Community Action (Acción Communal). Its following was primarily mestizo middle class, and its mood was antioligarchy and anti-Yankee. Harmodio Arias was the first Panamanian president to institute relief efforts for the isolated and impoverished countryside. He later established the University of Panama, which became the focal point for the political articulation of middle-class interests and nationalistic zeal.

Thus, a certain asymmetry developed in the trends underway in the 1930s that worked in Panama's favor. While the United States was assuming a more conciliatory stance, Panamanians were losing patience, and a political base for virulent nationalism was emerging. A dispute arose in 1932 over Panamanian opposition to the sale of 3.2-percent beer in the Canal Zone competing with Panamanian beers. Tension rose when the governor of the zone insisted on formally replying to the protests, despite the Panamanian government's well-known view that proper diplomatic relations should involve only the United States ambassador. In 1933 when unemployment in Panama reached a dangerous level and friction over the zone commissaries rekindled, President Harmodio Arias went to Washington.

The result was agreement on a number of issues. The United States pledged sympathetic consideration of future arbitration requests involving economic issues that did not affect the vital aspects of canal operation. Special efforts were to be made to protect Panamanian business interests from the smuggling of cheaply purchased commissary goods out of the zone. Washington also promised to seek appropriations from Congress to sponsor the repatriation of the numerous immigrant canal workers, who were aggravating the unemployment situation. Most important, however, was President Roosevelt's acceptance, in a joint statement with Harmodio Arias, that United States rights in the zone applied only for the purposes of "maintenance, operation, sanitation, and protection" of the canal. The resolution of this long-standing issue, along with a clear recognition of Panama as a sovereign nation, was a significant move in the direction of the Panamanian interpretation of the proper United States position in the isthmus.

This accord, though welcomed in Panama, came too early to deal with a major problem concerning the US$250,000 annuity. The devaluation of the United States dollar in 1934 reduced its gold content to 59.6 percent of its former value. This meant that the US$250,000 payment was nearly cut in half in the new devalued dollars. As a result, the Panamanian government refused to accept the annuity paid in the new dollars.

Roosevelt's visit to the republic in the summer of 1934 prepared the way for opening negotiations on this and other matters. A Panamanian mission arrived in Washington in November, and discussions on a replacement for the Hay-Bunau-Varilla Treaty continued through 1935. On March 2, 1936, Secretary of State Cordell Hull and Assistant Secretary of State Sumner Welles joined the Panamanian negotiators in signing a new treaty—the Hull-Alfaro Treaty—and three related conventions. The conventions regulated radio communications and provided for the United States to construct a new trans-isthmian highway connecting Panama City and Colón.

The treaty provided a new context for relations between the two countries. It abrogated the 1903 treaty's guarantee of the republic's independence and the concomitant right of intervention. Thereafter, the United States would substitute negotiation and purchase of land outside the zone for its former rights of expropriation. The dispute over the annuity was resolved by agreeing to fix it at 430,000 balboas (the balboa being equivalent to the devalued dollar) which increased the gold value of the original annuity by US$7,500. This was to be paid retroactively to 1934 when the republic had begun refusing the payments.

Various business and commercial provisions dealt with longstanding Panamanian complaints. Private commercial operations unconnected with canal operations were forbidden in the zone. This policy and the closing of the zone to foreign commerce were to provide Panamanian merchants with relief from competition. Free entry into the zone was provided for Panamanian goods, and the republic's customhouses were to be established at entrances to the zone to regulate the entry of goods finally destined for Panama.

The Hull-Alfaro revisions, though hailed by both governments, radically altered the special rights of the United States in the isthmus, and the United States Senate was reluctant to accept the alterations. Article X of the new treaty provided that in the event of any threat to the security of either nation, joint measures could be taken after consultation between the two. Only after an exchange of interpretative diplomatic notes had permitted Senator Key Pittman, chairman of the Foreign Relations Committee, to advise his colleagues that Panama was willing under this provision to permit the United States to act unilaterally, did the Senate give its consent on July 25, 1939.

== The war years ==
After ratifying the Hull-Alfaro Treaty in 1939, Panama and the United States began preparation for and collaboration in the coming war effort. Cooperation in this area proceeded smoothly for more than a year, with the republic participating in the series of conferences, declarations, and protocols that solidified the support of the hemisphere behind Washington's efforts to meet the threat of Axis aggression. This cooperation halted with the inauguration of Arnulfo Arias.

Arnulfo Arias has been elected to the presidency at least three times since 1940 (perhaps four or five if, as many believe, the vote counts of 1964 and 1984 were fraudulent), but he has never been allowed to serve a full term. He was first elected when he headed a mass movement known as Panameñismo. Its essence was nationalism, which in Panama's situation meant opposition to United States hegemony. Arias aspired to rid the country of non-Hispanics, which meant not only North Americans, but also West Indians, Chinese, Hindus, and Jews. He also seemed susceptible to the influence of Nazi and Fascist agents on the eve of the United States declaration of war against the Axis.

North Americans were by no means the only ones in Panama who were anxious to be rid of Arias. Even his brother, Harmodio, urged the United States embassy to move against the leader. United States officials made no attempt to conceal their relief when the National Police, in October 1941, took advantage of Arias's temporary absence from the country to depose him.

Arnulfo Arias had promulgated a new constitution in 1941, which was designed to extend his term of office. In 1945 a clash between Arias's successor, Ricardo Adolfo de la Guardia, and the National Assembly, led to the calling of a constituent assembly that elected a new president, Enrique A. Jiménez, and drew up a new constitution. The constitution of 1946 erased the innovations introduced by Arias and restored traditional concepts and structures of government.

In preparation for war, the United States had requested 999-year leases on more than 100 bases and sites. Arias balked, but ultimately approved a lease on one site after the United States threatened to occupy the land it wanted. De la Guardia proved more accommodating; he agreed to lease the United States 134 sites in the republic but not for 999 years. He would extend the leases only for the duration of the war plus one year beyond the signing of the peace treaty.

The United States transferred Panama City's water and sewer systems to the city administration and granted new economic assistance, but it refused to deport the West Indians and other non-Hispanics or to pay high rents for the sites. Among the major facilities granted to the United States under the agreement of 1942 were the airfield at Río Hato, the naval base on Isla Taboga, and several radar stations.

The end of the war brought another misunderstanding between the two countries. Although the peace treaty had not entered into effect, Panama demanded that the bases be relinquished, resting its claim on a subsidiary provision of the agreement permitting renegotiation after the cessation of hostilities. Overriding the desire of the United States War Department to hold most of the bases for an indefinite period, the United States Department of State took cognizance of growing nationalist dissatisfaction and in December 1946 sent Ambassador Frank T. Hines to propose a twenty-year extension of the leases on thirteen facilities. President Jiménez authorized a draft treaty over the opposition of the foreign minister and exacerbated latent resentment. When the National Assembly met in 1947 to consider ratification, a mob of 10,000 Panamanians armed with stones, machetes, and guns expressed opposition. Under these circumstances the deputies voted unanimously to reject the treaty. By 1948 the United States had evacuated all occupied bases and sites outside the Canal Zone.

The upheaval of 1947 was instigated in large measure by university students. Their clash with the National Police on that occasion, in which both students and policemen were killed, marked the beginning of a period of intense animosity between the two groups. The incident was also the first in which United States intentions were thwarted by a massive expression of Panamanian rage.

== The National Guard in ascendance ==
A temporary shift in power from the civilian aristocracy to the National Police occurred immediately after World War II. Between 1948 and 1952, National Police Commander José Antonio Remón Cantera installed and removed presidents with unencumbered ease. Among his behind-the-scenes manipulations were the denial to Arnulfo Arias of the presidency he apparently had won in 1948, the installation of Arias in the presidency in 1949, and the engineering of Arias's removal from office in 1951. Meanwhile, Remón increased salaries and fringe benefits for his forces and modernized training methods and equipment; in effect, he transformed the National Police from a police into a paramilitary force. In the spheres of security and public order, he achieved his long-sought goal by transforming the National Police into the National Guard in 1953 and introduced greater militarization into the country's only armed force. The missions and functions were little changed by the new title, but for Remón, this change was a step toward a national army.

From several preexisting parties and factions, Remón also organized the National Patriotic Coalition (Coalición Patriótico Nacional, CPN). He ran successfully as its candidate for the presidency in 1952. Remón followed national tradition by enriching himself through political office. He broke with tradition, however, by promoting social reform and economic development. His agricultural and industrial programs temporarily reduced the country's overwhelming economic dependence on the canal and the zone. Remón's reformist regime was short-lived, however. In 1955 he was machine-gunned to death at the racetrack outside Panama City. The first vice president, José Ramón Guizado, was impeached for the crime and jailed, but he was never tried, and the motivation for his alleged act remained unclear. Some investigators believed that the impeachment of Guizado was a smokescreen to distract attention from others implicated in the assassination, including United States organized crime figure "Lucky" Luciano, dissident police officers, and both Arias families. The second vice president, Ricardo Arias (of the aristocratic Arias family), served out the remainder of the presidential term and dismantled many of Remón's reforms.

Remón did not live to see the culmination of the major treaty revision he initiated. In 1953 Remón had visited Washington to discuss basic revisions of the 1936 treaty. Among other things, Panamanian officials wanted a larger share of the canal tolls, and merchants continued to be unhappy with the competition from the nonprofit commissaries in the Canal Zone. Remón also demanded that the discriminatory wage differential in the zone, which favored United States citizens over Panamanians, be abolished.

After lengthy negotiations a Treaty of Mutual Understanding and Cooperation was signed on January 23, 1955. Under its provisions commercial activities not essential to the operation of the canal were to be cut back. The annuity was enlarged to US$1,930,000. The principle of "one basic wage scale for all... employees... in the Canal Zone" was accepted and implemented. Panama's request for the replacement of the "perpetuity" clause by a ninety-nine-year renewable lease was rejected, however, as was the proposal that its citizens accused of violations in the zone be tried by joint United States-Panamanian tribunals.

Panama's contribution to the 1955 treaty was its consent to the United States occupation of the bases outside of the Canal Zone that it had withheld a few years earlier. Approximately 8,000 hectares of the republic's territory were leased rent-free for 15 years for United States military maneuvers. The Río Hato base, a particularly important installation in defense planning, was thus regained for the United States Air Force. Because the revisions had the strong support of President Ricardo Arias, the National Assembly approved them with little hesitation.

== The politics of frustrated nationalism ==
The CPN placed another candidate, Ernesto de la Guardia, in the presidency in 1956. The Remón government had required parties to enroll 45,000 members to receive official recognition. This membership requirement, subsequently relaxed to 5,000, had excluded all opposition parties from the 1956 elections except the National Liberal Party (Partido Liberal Nacional, PLN) which traced its lineage to the original Liberal Party.

De la Guardia was a conservative businessman and a member of the oligarchy. By Panamanian standards, he was by no means anti-Yankee, but his administration presided over a new low in United States-Panamanian relations. The Egyptian nationalization of the Suez Canal in 1956 raised new hopes in the republic, because the two canals were frequently compared in the world press. Despite Panama's large maritime fleet (the sixth greatest in the world), Britain and the United States did not invite Panama to a special conference of the major world maritime powers in London to discuss Suez. Expressing resentment, Panama joined the communist and neutral nations in a rival Suez proposal. United States Secretary of State John Foster Dulles's unqualified statement on the Suez issue on September 28, 1956—that the United States did not fear similar nationalization of the Panama Canal because the United States possessed "rights of sovereignty" there—worsened matters.

Panamanian public opinion was further inflamed by a United States Department of the Army statement in the summer of 1956 that implied that the 1955 treaty had not in fact envisaged a total equalization of wage rates. The United States attempted to clarify the issue by explaining that the only exception to the "equal pay for equal labor" principle would be a 25-percent differential that would apply to all citizens brought from the continental United States.

Tension mounted in the ensuing years. In May 1958 students demonstrating against the United States clashed with the National Guard. The violence of these riots, in which nine died, was a forecast of the far more serious difficulties that followed a year later. In November 1959 anti-United States demonstrations occurred during the two Panamanian independence holidays. Aroused by the media, particularly by articles in newspapers owned by Harmodio Arias, Panamanians began to threaten a "peaceful invasion" of the Canal Zone, to raise the flag of the republic there as tangible evidence of Panama's sovereignty. Fearful that Panamanian mobs might actually force entry into the Canal Zone, the United States called out its troops. Several hundred Panamanians crossed barbed-wire restraints and clashed with Canal Zone police and troops. A second wave of Panamanian citizens was repulsed by the National Guard, supported by United States troops.

Extensive and violent disorder followed. A mob smashed the windows of the United States Information Agency library. The United States flag was torn from the ambassador's residence and trampled. Aware that public hostility was getting out of hand, political leaders attempted to regain control over their followers but were unsuccessful. Relations between the two governments were severely strained. United States authorities erected a fence on the border of the Canal Zone, and United States citizens residing in the Canal Zone observed a voluntary boycott of Panamanian merchants, who traditionally depended heavily on these patrons.

On March 1, 1960 — Constitution Day — student and labor groups threatened another march into the Canal Zone. The widespread disorders of the previous fall had had a sobering effect on the political elite, who seriously feared that new rioting might be transformed into a revolutionary movement against the social system itself. Both major coalitions contesting the coming elections sought to avoid further difficulties, and influential merchants, who had been hard hit by the November 1959 riots, were apprehensive. Reports that the United States was willing to recommend flying the republic's flag in a special site in the Canal Zone served to ease tensions. Thus, serious disorders were averted.

De la Guardia's administration had been overwhelmed by the rioting and other problems, and the CPN, lacking effective opposition in the National Assembly, began to disintegrate. Most dissenting factions joined the PLN in the National Opposition Union, which in 1960 succeeded in electing its candidate, Roberto Chiari, to the presidency. De la Guardia became the first postwar president to finish a full four-year term in office, and Chiari had the distinction of being the first opposition candidate ever elected to the presidency.

Chiari attempted to convince his fellow oligarchs that change was inevitable. He cautioned that if they refused to accept moderate reform, they would be vulnerable to sweeping change imposed by uncontrollable radical forces. The tradition-oriented deputies who constituted a majority in the National Assembly did not heed his warning. His proposed reform program was simply ignored. In foreign affairs, Chiari's message to the Assembly on October 1, 1961, called for a new revision of the Canal Zone arrangement. When Chiari visited Washington on June 12 to 13, 1962, he and President John F. Kennedy agreed to appoint high-level representatives to discuss controversies between their countries regarding the Canal Zone. The results of the discussions were disclosed in a joint communiqué issued on July 23, 1963.

Agreement had been reached on the creation of the Bi-National Labor Advisory Committee to consider disputes arising between Panamanian employees and zone authorities. The United States had agreed to withhold taxes from its Panamanian employees to be remitted to the Panamanian government. Pending congressional approval, the United States agreed to extend to Panamanian employees the health and life insurance benefits available to United States citizens in the zone.

Several other controversial matters, however, remained unresolved. The United States agreed to increase the wages of Panamanian employees in the zone, but not as much as the Panamanian government requested. No agreement was reached in response to Panamanian requests for jurisdiction over a corridor through the zone linking the two halves of the country.

Meanwhile, the United States had initiated a new aid program for all of Latin America—the Alliance for Progress. Under this approach to hemisphere relations, President Kennedy envisioned a long-range program to raise living standards and advance social and economic development. No regular United States government development loans or grants had been available to Panama through the late 1950s. The Alliance for Progress, therefore, was the first major effort of the United States to improve basic living conditions. Panama was to share in the initial, large-scale loans to support self-help housing. Nevertheless, pressure for major revisions of the treaties and resentment of United States recalcitrance continued to mount.
