= 1960 Panamanian general election =

General elections were held in Panama on 20 May 1960, electing both a new President of the Republic and a new National Assembly.

According to Jan Knippers Black and Edmundo Flores, "Ernesto de la Guardia's administration had been overwhelmed by the rioting and other problems, and the National Patriotic Coalition, lacking effective opposition in the National Assembly, began to disintegrate. Most dissenting factions joined the National Liberal Party in the National Opposition Union."

The 1960 election was without precedent in Panama. For once the usual charges of illegal intervention by the National Guard were absent, and the opposition Liberal coalition candidate, Roberto Francisco Chiari Remón, was declared the winner and installed in office in an unexpectedly peaceful transfer of power.

== Results ==
=== President ===
Candidate	Party or alliance		Votes	%
Roberto Francisco Chiari Remón	National Opposition Union	National Liberal Party	42,394	17.56
Roberto Francisco Chiari Remón	National Opposition Union	Republican Party	26,073	10.80
Roberto Francisco Chiari Remón	National Opposition Union	Third Nationalist Party	16,068	6.65
Roberto Francisco Chiari Remón	National Opposition Union	National Liberation Movement	15,507	6.42
Roberto Francisco Chiari Remón	National Opposition Union	Total	100,042	41.43
Ricardo Arias	National Patriotic Coalition		85,981	35.61
Víctor Florencio Goytía	Popular Alliance	Liberal Civic Resistance Party	29,031	12.02
Víctor Florencio Goytía	Popular Alliance	National Progressive Party	9,785	4.05
Víctor Florencio Goytía	Popular Alliance	DIPAL Party	8,635	3.58
Víctor Florencio Goytía	Popular Alliance	Renewal Party	8,004	3.31
Víctor Florencio Goytía	Popular Alliance	Total	55,455	22.96
Total			241,478	100.00
Valid votes			241,478	93.58
Invalid/blank votes			16,561	6.42
Total votes			258,039	100.00
Registered voters/turnout			435,454	59.26
Source: Nohlen

=== National Assembly ===
Party or alliance		Seats
National Opposition Union	National Liberal Party	8
National Opposition Union	Republican Party	9
National Opposition Union	Third Nationalist Party	7
National Opposition Union	National Liberation Movement	4
National Opposition Union	Total	28
National Patriotic Coalition		18
Popular Alliance	Liberal Civic Resistance Party	3
Popular Alliance	National Progressive Party	2
Popular Alliance	DIPAL Party	1
Popular Alliance	Renewal Party	1
Popular Alliance	Total	7
Total		53
Source: Nohlen
