= 1948 Panamanian general election =

General elections were held in Panama on 27 May 1948, electing both a new President of the Republic and a new National Assembly.

"For the 1948 campaign the reigning Liberal Doctrinaire Party chose 73-year-old Domingo Díaz Arosemena as its candidate. Arnulfo Arias Madrid rose from the political dead, dusted off his ‘panameñismo’ nationalism, and in an initial count by the National Elections Board apparently won the presidency by 1500 votes. Díaz supporters thereupon attacked the Board. At this point José Antonio Remón Cantera, head of the National Guard, took charge. Under his protection the Elections Board magically made enough of Arias’s votes disappear so Díaz became President".

== Results ==
=== President ===
Candidate	Party	Votes	%
Domingo Díaz Arosemena	Liberal Union–Socialist Party	76,459	38.55
Arnulfo Arias	Authentic Revolutionary Party	71,897	36.25
José Isaac Fábrega	National Revolutionary Party–Renewal Party	41,296	20.82
Sergio González Ruiz	Popular Union Party–Patriotic Front	5,634	2.84
Demetrio Augusto Porras	Independent	3,075	1.55
Total		198,361	100.00
Valid votes		198,361	91.74
Invalid/blank votes		17,853	8.26
Total votes		216,214	100.00
Registered voters/turnout		305,123	70.86
Source: Nohlen

=== National Assembly ===
Party	Seats
Liberal Union	17
Authentic Revolutionary Party	12
National Revolutionary Party	3
Renewal Party	7
Popular Union Party	2
Patriotic Front	0
Socialist Party	0
Independents	1
Total	42
Source: Political Handbook of the World

== Aftermath ==
On 28 July 1949 the president Domingo Díaz Arosemena took a six-month leave for health reasons. The First Vice-president Daniel Chanis Pinzón was sworn in as acting chief executive. Chanis became president following Arosemena's death on 23 August 1949.

Daniel Chanis Pinzón's presidency came to an end on 20 November. Police Chief José Antonio Remón Cantera led a coup d'état in response to Chanis's refusal to overturn a Panama Supreme Court decision invalidating a contract between an abattoir that was "part of José Antonio Remón Cantera's business empire" and several powerful Panamanian families. Daniel Chanis Pinzón had asked for Remón's resignation previously, and, when Remón refused, tendered his own resignation in protest. Whether this resignation was voluntary or forced by Remón is unclear, although it would appear that foreign diplomatic pressure, not wanting to see full out bloodshed, encouraged the resignation.

Daniel Chanis Pinzón was replaced by Second Vice-president, and Remón's cousin, Roberto Francisco Chiari Remón.

But Roberto Chiari, lacked effective political support; after two days Chanis tried a comeback. He rescinded his resignation in the presence of the National Assembly, then led a hastily organized march on the palace to reclaim his job. Police turned the marchers back with tear gas and gunfire. Then the Supreme Court decided to review the constitutionality of the Chiari regime. That convinced Remón that he would have to try a third President. Even before the court spoke, the disgusted strong man cried: "If they want legality, I'll give them legality. I'll give them Arnulfo!". Arnulfo Arias Madrid would have won the 1948 presidential elections if an electoral jury had not thrown out 2,714 of his ballots. When the Supreme Court declared ousted Daniel Chanis still the lawful President, Remón went straight to Arnulfo's Bella Vista home and invited the man he helped toss out in 1941 to take over at the palace. Quickly summoned crowds rushed to the Presidencia and roared approval as Remón, presenting the new president, shouted: "Arias is legality." Arnulfistas who had been dodging Remón's cops for years yelled: "Viva Remón!" Within hours, the electoral jury amiably announced that Arnulfo Arias had really won in 1948 after all, revising the totals to 74,080 for Arias and 71,536 for Díaz.

On 7 May 1951 the 1946 constitution was abrogated to make way for the return of the 1941 constitution, which gave the President broader powers and a longer term of office (six years instead of four)

After suspending the 1946 constitution, Arnulfo Arias Madrid tried to destroy the National Assembly and Supreme Court. On 9 May the Assembly retaliated by impeaching him and electing the First Vice-president Alcibíades Arosemena as president. Arias asked Remón for protection. Concluding that Arias could no longer be trusted, Remón sided with the Assembly. But when Remón’s two top aides served the eviction notice on the President, Arias’s supporters killed both in cold blood. The Assembly brought Arias to trial, stripped him of all political rights, and sent him off into exile.
