= 1945 Panamanian Constitutional Assembly election =

Constitutional Assembly elections were held in Panama on 5 May 1945.

On 28 December 1944, a severe political crisis took place just prior to the opening of the National Assembly which was to convene on 2 January 1945. The next day President Ricardo Adolfo de la Guardia Arango suspended the Constitution of 1941, consequently cancelled the next prescribed session of the National Assembly, and called for a general election on 5 May 1945, to elect delegates to a Constitutional Assembly which would frame a new Constitution. Political tension continued during the spring of 1945 but the elections held on 5 May 1945, were peaceful and orderly, with approximately 110000 voters participating (women voted in the national election for the first time). These elections showed a heavy vote for liberal elements and a coalition of the Liberal Renewal Party of Francisco Arias Paredes, the Liberal Democratic Party of Enrique Adolfo Jiménez, elements of the Liberal Doctrinaire Party of Domingo Díaz Arosemena, and elements of the National Revolutionary Party (the "official" party of the de la Guardia administration) united and, controlling 30 of the 46 delegates to the Constitutional Assembly, elected Enrique Adolfo Jiménez, former Panamanian Ambassador to Washington, Provisional President of the Republic to hold office during the life of the Constitutional Assembly and until a new president, elected in accordance with the provisions of the new Constitution, would assume office. This election took place on 15 June 1945. Former President de la Guardia retired from public office to become Director and General Manager of the newspaper La Nacion.

== Results ==
Party	Votes	%	Seats
Liberal Renewal Party	34,147	32.13	12
National Revolutionary Party	20,833	19.60	10
Liberal Democratic Party	15,399	14.49	7
Liberal Doctrinaire Party	13,545	12.75	7
Chiarista Liberal Party	13,244	12.46	6
Socialist Party	5,997	5.64	2
Conservative Party	3,111	2.93	2
Total	106,276	100.00	46
Source: Nohlen
