= Popular Union Party (Panama) =

The Popular Union Party (in Spanish: Partido Unión Popular, PUP) was a Panamanian centrist liberal political party.

It was founded in 1947 by Sergio González Ruiz. Sergio González Ruiz was one of leaders of the Community Action (in 1920s-1930s) and Liberal Doctrinaire Party (in 1930s-1940s). In 1946 five liberal parties have allied within the Liberal Unification. Its five original parties were the Liberal Doctrinaire Party (led by Domingo Díaz Arosemena), Liberal Democratic Party (under Enrique Adolfo Jiménez), Liberal Renewal Party (under Francisco Arias Paredes), Chiarista Liberal Party (under Roberto Francisco Chiari Remón) and United Liberal Party (founded by died ex-President Belisario Porras Barahona). After the 1947 Liberal Unification nominating convention, Sergio González Ruiz faction withdrew from the Liberal Unification.

For the 1948 elections, the PUP presented its presidential candidate, Sergio González Ruiz. He polled 5,634 votes (02.84%). The PUP won 2 legislative seats.

In 1952 the PUP joined the Liberal Party “del Matadero”, National Revolutionary Party, Authentic Revolutionary Party and Renewal Party to form the National Patriotic Coalition (CPN) to support the presidential aspirations of Colonel José Antonio Remón Cantera, head of the National Police.

In 1953 the National Patriotic Coalition was reorganized as a single party. In 1959 the former PUP faction left the CPN.
