= Renewal Party =

The Renewal Party (in Spanish: Partido Renovador, PREN) was a Panamanian right liberal political party.

The Renewal Party was founded in 1947 by one of the Liberal Unification factions. In 1946 five liberal parties have allied within the Liberal Unification. Its five original parties were the Liberal Doctrinaire Party (led by Domingo Díaz Arosemena), Liberal Democratic Party (under Enrique Adolfo Jiménez), Liberal Renewal Party (under Francisco Arias Paredes), Chiarista Liberal Party (under Roberto Francisco Chiari Remón) and United Liberal Party (founded by died ex-President Belisario Porras Barahona). After the 1947 Liberal Unification nominating convention, one of the Liberal Renovador factions withdrew from the Liberal Unification when their candidate failed to get the nomination and became the Renewal Party.

For the 1948 elections, the PREN presented its presidential candidate, José Joaquin Vallarino. At the beginning of 1948 José Joaquin Vallarino withdrew from the presidential race and the PREN and National Revolutionary Party (PNR) formed a coalition to back José Isaac Fábrega of the PNR. José Isaac Fábrega polled 41,296 votes (20.82%) and came third. The PREN won 7 legislative seats.

In 1952 the PREN joined the Liberal Party “del Matadero”, National Revolutionary Party, Authentic Revolutionary Party and Popular Union Party to form the National Patriotic Coalition (CPN) to support the presidential aspirations of Colonel José Antonio Remón Cantera, head of the National Police. Ricardo Arias, a leader of the PREN and son of Francisco Arias Paredes became Second Vice-President to José Antonio Remón Cantera and taking over the presidency following Remon's assassination.

In 1953 the National Patriotic Coalition was reorganized as a single party. Remon conceived of the CPN as a system whereby political power was wielded by one faction of the official party and then another. Following Remon's assassination in 1955, the former PREN faction under Ricardo Arias guided the CPN, but when Ernesto de la Guardia was elected president in 1956, he lured the Liberal Democrat faction away from the National Liberal Party (PLN) and gave it dominance in the CPN. De la Guardia abetted friction among the parties in the official coalition. In 1959 the former PREN faction left the CPN and registered as separate political party, Renewal Party.

In 1960 PREN allied with the Popular Alliance (AP) and its candidate Víctor Florencio Goytía of National Liberal Party (PLN). PREN polled 8,004 votes (03.31%) and won 1 legislative seat.

In 1964 PREN allied with the National Opposition Alliance (ANO) and its candidate Juan de Arco Galindo of National Patriotic Coalition (CPN). PREN polled only 4,218 votes (01.33%) and won 1 legislative seat.

The PREN was abolished by the Electoral Tribunal in 1964.
