= 1951 Panamanian coup d'état =

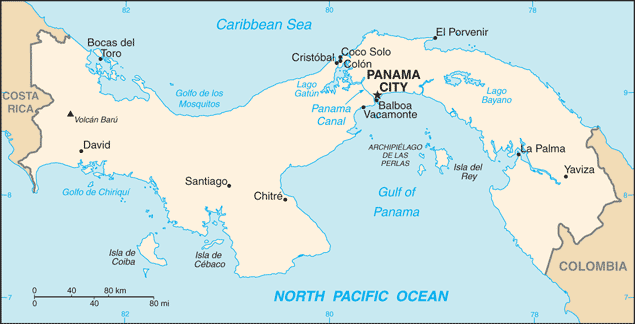
Date	May 7–10, 1951
Location	Panama City, Panama
Result	Coup attempt successful

Belligerents
Government of Panama	(Panama) National Police

Commanders and leaders
(Panama) Arnulfo Arias Madrid	(Panama) José Antonio Remón

Casualties and losses
- 16 killed

The 1951 Panamanian coup d'état was the overthrow in Panama of the second Arnulfo Arias Madrid administration by dissident armed forces, led by José Antonio Remón, Commander of the militarized National Police. Following a few days of turmoil, he was arrested and replaced by Vice President Alcibiades Arosemena.

== Background ==
Arnulfo Arias Madrid, a surgeon and physician educated in the United States, was elected President of Panama in October 1940. His initial tenure was cut short however, when he was deposed in a bloodless coup in 1941. Following his overthrow, a string of provisional governments led the country until elections were held in 1948. After spending years in exile, Arias Madrid returned to Panama and ran in the 1948 Panama general election, unofficially winning a majority of the votes. However, the official count disqualified enough votes for Arias to hand victory to his opponent, Domingo Diaz Arosemena. After suffering a heart attack, Arosemena resigned, dying less than a month later. Following his death, Daniel Chanis succeeded him as provisional president. Due to Chanis' attempts to remove police chief José A. Remón, he was deposed of. In November 1949, Arias Madrid was installed as president, with Remon leveraging the unofficial results of the 1948 election to legitimize the coup.

During his administration, President Arias faced intense opposition due to his past regime and return to power, exacerbated by political blunders in early 1950 which led to further dissatisfaction and opposition to the government. His honeymoon period with the police chief also ended as his authority and actions began gaining more scrutiny. As a result, President Arias considered doing drastic measures such as dissolving the National Assembly and Supreme court. In his February 1951 speech, he criticized the assembly, which had increasingly opposed him over time.

Internationally, President Arias sought to align the country closely with the United States, supporting democracy and opposing communism. These efforts to ingratiate himself with the west were aimed at securing his presidency and power. The Truman administration promptly recognized the new government, lifting the diplomatic sanctions it had imposed earlier.

== Coup attempt ==
On May 7, 1951, President Arias dissolved the National Assembly and suspended the 1946 Constitution, restoring the more authoritarian constitution from his previous short-lived term in 1941. His maneuver to consolidate power sparked widespread demonstrations and a general strike. The National Assembly voted in favor of his impeachment. By the following day, protesters and armed dissidents had surrounded the Presidential Palace, resulting in violent clashes with government forces. On May 10, President Arias surrendered and was arrested. He was replaced by his vice president, Alcibiades Arosemena, by the National Assembly on the same day. In the end, sixteen people had been killed during the political violence of early May.
