= Aquilino Boyd =

Panamanian politician, diplomat and lawyer

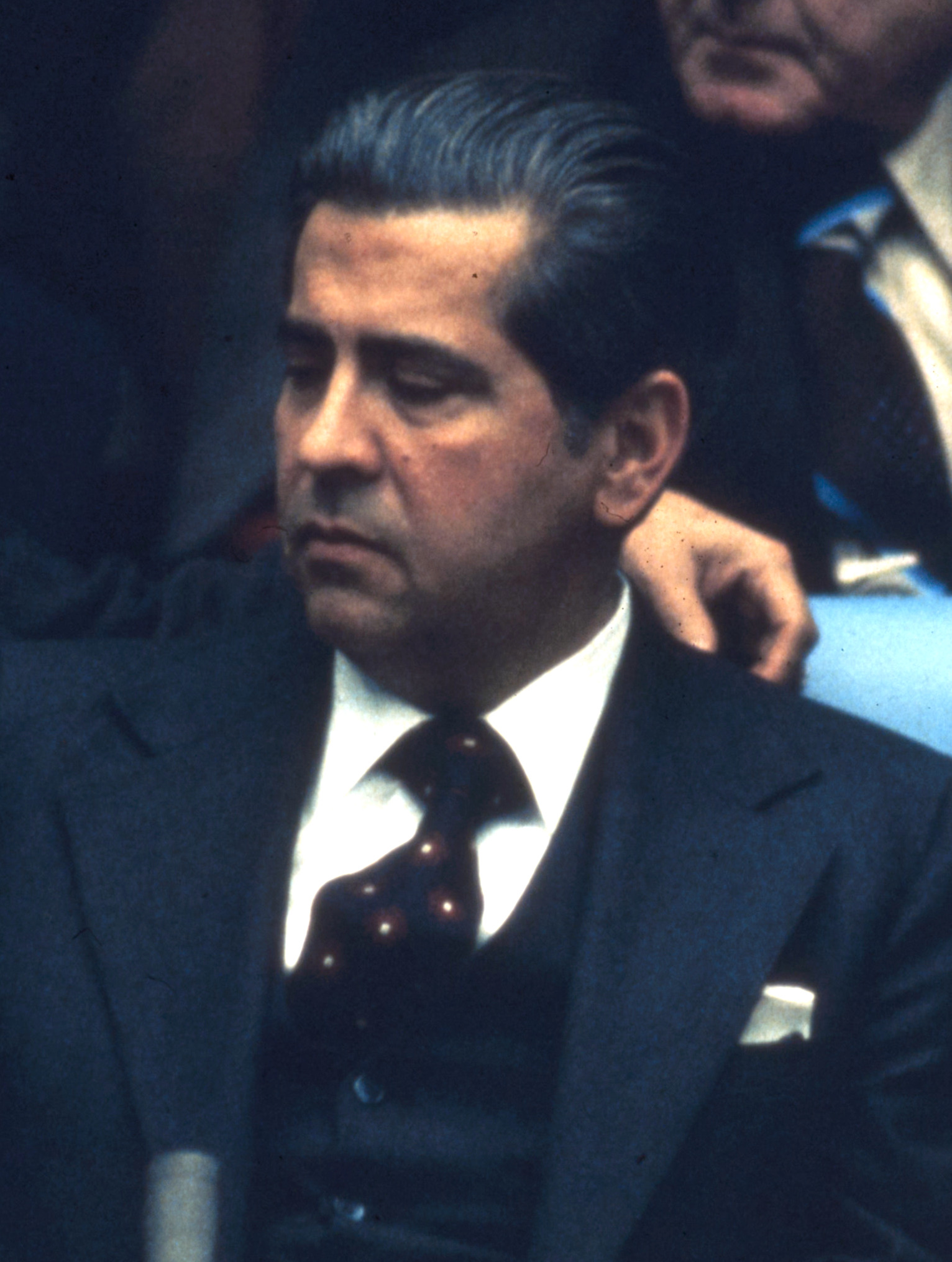
Boyd at the United Nations

Aquilino Edgardo Boyd de la Guardia (March 30, 1921 – September 4, 2004) was a Panamanian politician, diplomat and lawyer.

Aquilino Boyd was born in 1921 in Panama. He married Dora Brin. He studied in La Salle, Panama City, Holy Cross College, US, University de la Habana and University of Panama.

Aquilino Boyd, a member of one of the old ruling families and oligarch, he served as foreign minister of Panama (1956–58), permanent representative to the United Nations (1962–76), member of National Assembly for five terms (1948–52, 1956–60, 1960–64, 1964–68, 1968–69), president of the National Assembly (1949). In 1964 he shot newspaper editor Escolastico Calvo after he ran a scathing editorial.

He was one of leaders of the National Patriotic Coalition, in 1959 founded the Third Nationalist Party, after having left the National Patriotic Coalition in a disagreement with then President Ernesto de la Guardia. Boyd led the agitation against the Canal Zone, and delivered the Third Nationalist Party to the National Liberal Party coalition (National Opposition Union) in on the basis of Roberto Francisco Chiari Remón's nationalist stance. Shortly after the election Boyd lost control of the Third Nationalist Party to Gilberto Arias, and founded the Nationalist Party.

Aquilino Boyd was one of the first wave of civilian politicians to make peace with the military dictatorship (1968–1989). In his capacity as a diplomat and foreign minister played a key role in the negotiations that led to the 1977 Panama Canal Treaties. He served as foreign minister of Panama (1976–77), permanent representative to the United Nations (1985–89, 1997–99), ambassador to the United States (1982–85) and to the United Kingdom (1994–97). In 1979 he became one of leaders of the Liberal Party. He was the COLINA nominee for second vice-president of Panama in 1989.

Aquilino Boyd died in Panama City on 4 September 2004.
