= 1936 Panamanian general election =

General elections were held in Panama on 7 June 1936, electing both a new President of the Republic and a new National Assembly.

According to Thomas L. Pearcy, "Instead of supporting the candidate of his own Liberal Doctrinaire Party (Domingo Díaz Arosemena), the President Harmodio Arias Madrid supported Juan Demóstenes Arosemena Barreati, his minister of foreign relations. Arosemena continued to function as part of the administration throughout his campaign. With President Harmodio Arias as his political patron, Arosemena stuck to his controversial (and unconstitutional) candidacy. On election day, the administration distributed duplicate 'cédulas' (voter registration cards), destroyed ballot boxes, detained opposing members of the electoral board, and concocted 'el paquetazo de Veraguas'. The result was a high voter turnout that exceeded all predictions – and possibilities – and brought Arosemena to the presidency despite his constitutional ineligibility."

== Results ==
=== President ===
Candidate	Party or alliance		Votes	%
Juan Demóstenes Arosemena	National Coalition	National Revolutionary Party	41,747	46.91
Juan Demóstenes Arosemena	National Coalition	Chiarista Liberal Party	41,747	46.91
Juan Demóstenes Arosemena	National Coalition	Conservative Party	41,747	46.91
Domingo Díaz Arosemena	Popular Front	Liberal Doctrinaire Party	39,982	44.93
Domingo Díaz Arosemena	Popular Front	Liberal Renewal Party	39,982	44.93
Domingo Díaz Arosemena	Popular Front	Liberal Democratic Party	39,982	44.93
Domingo Díaz Arosemena	Popular Front	Socialist Party	39,982	44.93
Belisario Porras Barahona	United Liberal Party		7,268	8.17
Total			88,997	100.00
Source: The New International Year Book for the Year

=== National Assembly ===
Party or alliance		Seats
National Coalition	National Revolutionary Party	9
National Coalition	Chiarista Liberal Party	7
National Coalition	Conservative Party	2
Popular Front	Liberal Doctrinaire Party	8
Popular Front	Liberal Democratic Party	4
Popular Front	Socialist Party	1
Popular Front	Liberal Renewal Party	0
United Liberal Party		1
Total		32
Source: Political Handbook of the World

== Aftermath ==
President Arosemena died on 16 December 1939 and was briefly succeeded by Ezequiel Fernández Jaén who was his second vice-president while the first one, Augusto Samuel Boyd, left Washington where he was acting as Panamanian ambassador, came to Panama.
