= National Liberation Movement (Panama) =

The National Liberation Movement (in Spanish: Movimiento de Liberación Nacional, MLN) was a Panamanian right-wing liberal political party.

It was created in 1959 by Temístocles Díaz Q., a son of the late President Domingo Díaz Arosemena and a prominent National Patriotic Coalition (CPN) leader and First Vice-President under Ernesto de la Guardia (1956–1960).

A formal split in the CPN took place on 27 May 1957 when Temístocles Diaz Q. broke with the CPN and took with him six deputies of the former Popular Union Party and Authentic Revolutionary Party. The reason for the split was general dissatisfaction with the president's political leadership. On 3 June 1957, Diaz was joined in his stand by former President Alcibíades Arosemena and four ex-cabinet members and formed a new party named the National Liberation Movement to oppose de la Guardia.

In 1960 and 1964 the MLN allied with the National Opposition Union (UNO) and its candidates Roberto Francisco Chiari Remón and Marco Aurelio Robles Méndez. The MLN polled 15,507 votes (06.42%) in 1960 and 12,920 votes (04.07%) in 1964.

In 1968 MLN allied with the People's Alliance (ADP) and its candidate David Samudio Ávila and polled 20,987 votes (06.54%).

All political parties including the MLN were banned by Omar Torrijos after the military coup of 1968.

In 1981 the MLN joined the National Patriotic Coalition, Third Nationalist Party and factions that had earlier split off from National Liberal Party and Republican Party to form the opposition National Liberal Republican Movement (MOLIRENA). Jorge Rubén Rosas, a leader of MLN, was of the Vice-President of MOLIRENA.
