= List of ambassadors of Panama to China =

Ambassador of Panama to China
- Incumbent; Leonardo Alfonso Kam Binns since November 22, 2019
- Inaugural holder: Mario E. Guillén
- Formation: May 1, 1954

The Panamanian ambassador in Beijing is the official representative of the Government in Panama City to the Government of the People's Republic of China. Between 1949 and 2017, Panama did not have relations with the People's Republic of China, instead recognising Taiwan.

== List of representatives ==
designated	ambassador	Observations	List of heads of state of Panama	List of premiers of the Republic of China	Term end
May 1, 1954	Mario E. Guillén	Both governments had raised their legations to embassies.	José Antonio Remón Cantera	Yu Hung-chun	
November 14, 1954	Mario E. Guillén	M. Mario E. Guillen, first Panamanian Ambassador to the Republic of China presented his credentials to President Chiang.: Since 30 June 1952 he was Consul-General in Hong Kong.	José Antonio Remón Cantera	Yu Hung-Chun	
March 28, 1962	Sofia Karicas de La Barbera		Roberto Francisco Chiari Remón	Chen Cheng	December 25, 1965
February 7, 1965	Adolfo J. Arrocha	Ambassador Arrocha arrived on February 7. He succeeded Sofia Karicas, who had been the only woman in the resident diplomatic corps. Premier C.K. Yen received Ambassador Arrocha at the Executive Yuan. He was appointed alternate ambassador to the OAS in 1968.	Marco Aurelio Robles	Yen Chia-kan	March 9, 1967
May 5, 1967	Caesar Augusto Guillen Marcucci	In 1969, he assumed his new post as ambassador to Seoul, South Korea.	Marco Aurelio Robles	Yen Chia-kan	March 23, 1969
December 4, 1971	Ricardo E. Chiari de Leon	In 1979, he was transferred to Peru as a member in the government of Roberto Chiari	Demetrio Basilio Lakas	Yen Chia-kan	February 2, 1979
October 30, 1975	Napoleon Franco	Panamanian ambassador to Japan and the Republic of China, arrived for a three-day visit.	Demetrio Basilio Lakas	Chiang Ching-kuo	
February 13, 1979	Ramon Sieiro Murgas	President Chiang Ching-kuo received Ramon Sieiro Murgas, ambassador of Panama Ramon Sieiro Murgas	Arístides Royo	Sun Yun-suan	
November 8, 1996	Carlos Alberto Mendoza		Ernesto Pérez Balladares	Lien Chan	
September 25, 2004	José Antonio Dominguez		Martín Torrijos	Yu Shyi-kun	
January 1, 2011	Mario Luis Cucalón D'Anello	巴拿馬駐華大使古 卡隆 January 1, 2011: S.E. Mario Luis Cucalón D'Anello, Ambassador of the Republic of Panama	Ricardo Martinelli	Wu Den-yih	
November 24, 2014	Alfredo Martíz Fuentes		Juan Carlos Varela	Jiang Yi-huah	April 20, 2017
June 13, 2017		The governments in Beijing and Panama City established diplomatic relations.	Juan Carlos Varela	Li Keqiang	
September 13, 2017	Francisco Carlo Escobar Pedreschi	First Panamanian ambassador to the People's Republic of China	Juan Carlos Varela	Li Keqiang	2019
November 22, 2019	Leonardo Alfonso Kam Binns		Laurentino Cortizo	Li Keqiang (until March 11, 2023) Li Qiang	
