= 1940 Panamanian general election =

General elections were held in Panama on 11 May 1940, electing both a new president of the Republic and a new National Assembly.

Arnulfo Arias' ties to the incumbent administration and, consequently, to the National Police gave him the advantage over his opponent. Moreover, his temporary electoral coalition of liberal parties augmented his support among members of the electoral board.

Shortly before polling day Ricardo J. Alfaro (the opposition coalition candidate) fled into the Zone for sanctuary, and Arnulfo Arias (the candidate of the National Revolutionary Party) became president by the familiar walkover.

Arnulfo Arias pieced together a political coalition, including some oligarchs with fascistic tendencies and the growing, nationalistic middle class. He swept into power by a vote of 107,750 to 3,022. Arnulfo Arias was elected on the basis of a nationalist program which rested on hostility to all foreigners in general and to the United States and the West Indian and Chinese minorities in Panama in particular.

== Results ==
=== President ===
Candidate	Party or alliance		Votes	%
Arnulfo Arias	National Coalition	National Revolutionary Party	107,750	97.27
Arnulfo Arias	National Coalition	Chiarista Liberal Party	107,750	97.27
Arnulfo Arias	National Coalition	Conservative Party	107,750	97.27
Arnulfo Arias	National Coalition	Liberal Democratic Party	107,750	97.27
Arnulfo Arias	National Coalition	United Liberal Party	107,750	97.27
Ricardo J. Alfaro	Popular Front	Liberal Doctrinaire Party	3,022	2.73
Ricardo J. Alfaro	Popular Front	Liberal Renewal Party	3,022	2.73
Ricardo J. Alfaro	Popular Front	Socialist Party	3,022	2.73
Total			110,772	100.00
Source: LaFeber

=== National Assembly ===
Party or alliance		Seats	+/–
National Coalition	National Revolutionary Party	17	+8
National Coalition	Liberal Democratic Party	6	+2
National Coalition	Chiarista Liberal Party	5	–2
National Coalition	United Liberal Party	2	+1
National Coalition	Conservative Party	1	–1
Popular Front	Liberal Doctrinaire Party	0	–8
Popular Front	Liberal Renewal Party	0	0
Popular Front	Socialist Party	0	–1
Autonomous Provincial Concentration		1	New
Total		32	–
Source: Political Handbook of the World, Almanaque Panameño

== Aftermath ==
Between his inauguration in 1940 and his overthrow one year later, Arnulfo Arias increased the size and the power of the central government in Panama City, in an attempt to counter opposition to his administration. He began by calling a plebiscite to draft a new constitution. "Arnulfo Arias Madrid had promulgated a new constitution in 1941, which was designed to extend his term of office.

"In 1941 the United States urged the Panamanian Police to oust President Arias Madrid, who was balking at granting Washington ninety-nine-year leases on additional military bases and sites outside the Canal Zone".

Early on the morning of 7 October 1941, Arnulfo Arias took a plane for Habana, Cuba, traveling incognito, under the name of A. Madrid to see his "eye doctor". However, before departing, he had neglected to obtain permission from the Supreme Court or the National Assembly to leave the country, a requirement stipulated in the laws of the Republic. His absence was therefore declared unauthorized, and this fact opened the way for a change of government by constitutional procedure and without disorder. According to the Constitution, in the absence of the President, the head of the government shall be the First, the Second, or the Third Vice President, in order, and in the absence of all three, the Cabinet shall elect one of its own members to exercise the presidency. "Before the President's plane had decanted him in Cuba, Panama was abuzz. When he heard that Don Arnulfo was gone, onetime Police Chief Colonel Manuel Pino rubbed his hands. With two other veteran politicos, Julio Fabrega and Leopoldo Arosemena, he had been planning for a month to seize the police force and set up a junta. But before the junta could step in, another figure appeared. He was pale-faced, lame Ricardo Adolfo de la Guardia Arango, one of the best friends the U.S. had in Arias' Cabinet. He took over the police in Arias' name, spoiling the junta's plans. By 9 the next morning he had decided to take over himself, had started a police roundup of Arias' henchmen". When Arias left Panama, the First Vice-president, Jose Pezet, could not be found; the Third Vice-president, Anibal Rios D., was in Lima where he was serving as Panamanian Minister to Peru; but the Second Vice-president, Ernesto Jaén Guardia, Panamanian Minister to Mexico, happened to be in Panama City on leave, and on the morning of 9 October 1941, he officially assumed control of the Government of Panama and appointed a new Cabinet. Three hours later he resigned, and the Cabinet elected its ranking member, Ricardo Adolfo de la Guardia Arango, Minister of Government and Justice, to head the government. "At 10 the Cabinet met in the Balboa police station to form a new Government. As President it picked Ernesto Jaén Guardia, who was sworn in at 1 p.m. But after two members of the old Cabinet were arrested, Ernesto Jaén Guardia decided that he did not choose to rule, and by the end of the afternoon Ricardo Adolfo de la Guardia Arango was Panama's boss. All these changes were constitutional". Ricardo Adolfo de la Guardia Arango immediately took oath of office before the Supreme Court. He retained the Cabinet which elected him and appointed his brother, Camilo de la Guardia, as Minister of Government and Justice. At that time, Ricardo Adolfo de la Guardia's title was not that of President, but "Encargado del Poder Ejecutivo" — the person charged with the Executive Power. However, on 18 October 1941, the Cabinet met and issued a resolution declaring that he was entitled to all the attributes of president, and from then on he carried the title of President of Panama. The First Vice-president, Jose Pezet, resigned on 11 October 1941; and the Third Vice-president, Anibal Rios D., resigned on 13 December 1941.

Ricardo Adolfo de la Guardia Arango assumed power following the resignation of the three Designates, and the next session of the National Assembly in January 1943 declined to elect new Designates. The opposition to President de la Guardia in the summer of 1944 kept insisting that Designates should be elected when the National Assembly met in January 1945. The first Designate would have automatically become president. On 28 December 1944, a severe political crisis took place just prior to the opening of the National Assembly which was to convene on 2 January 1945. The next day President de la Guardia suspended the Constitution of 1941, consequently cancelled the next prescribed session of the National Assembly, and called for a general election on 5 May 1945, to elect delegates to a Constitutional Assembly which would frame a new Constitution.
