= Third Nationalist Party =

Political Party of Republic of Panama

The Third Nationalist Party (in Spanish: Tercer Partido Nacionalista, TPN) was a Panamanian conservative, radical nationalist political party.

The Third Nationalist Party was founded in 1959 by Aquilino Edgardo Boyd de la Guardia (a member of the old ruling families and oligarch) and Gilberto Arias Guardia (son of the former President Harmodio Arias Madrid and nephew of the former President Arnulfo Arias ).

In the 1950s, Aquilino Boyd was a prominent National Patriotic Coalition (CPN) leader. He served as Foreign Minister of Panama (1956–58). In 1958, Aquilino Boyd left the CPN in a disagreement with then President Ernesto de la Guardia. Arias supported the Ernesto de la Guardia administration in 1956-1960 and served as Minister of Finance and Treasury (1957–1958).

Aquilino Boyd led the agitation against the Canal Zone , and delivered the TPN to the National Liberal Party (PLN) coalition in on the basis of Roberto Francisco Chiari Remón's nationalist stance. Shortly after the 1960 election Aquilino Boyd lost control of the TPN to Gilberto Arias Guardia. Boyd withdrew his faction and created the Nationalist Party (PN), which joined the PLN coalition (1964). Gilberto Arias returned the TPN to the CPN coalition for, and is supporting Juan de Arco Galindo (1964). In 1968 TPN allied with the National Union (UN) and its candidate Arnulfo Arias.

All political parties including the TPN were banned by Omar Torrijos after the military coup of 1968.

In 1981 the TPN joined the National Patriotic Coalition, National Liberation Movement and factions that had earlier split off from National Liberal Party and Republican Party to form the opposition National Liberal Republican Movement (MOLIRENA). Abraham Pretto, a leader of TPN, was of the Vice-President of MOLIRENA.
