= 1956 Panamanian general election =

General elections were held in Panama on 13 May 1956, electing both a new President of the Republic and a new National Assembly.

"The National Patriotic Coalition was almost unopposed in the 1956 election race. The National Liberal Party made the gesture of offering candidates but did not campaign vigorously."

Ernesto de la Guardia Navarro, the government candidate, was a conservative businessman and a member of the oligarchy. The José Antonio Remón Cantera’ government had required parties to enroll 45,000 members to receive official recognition. This membership requirement, subsequently relaxed to 5,000, had excluded all opposition parties from the 1956 elections except the National Liberal Party (PLN) which traced its lineage to the original Liberal Party.

== Results ==
=== President ===
Candidate	Party	Votes	%
Ernesto de la Guardia Navarro	National Patriotic Coalition	177,633	68.49
Víctor Florencio Goytía	National Liberal Party	81,737	31.51
Total		259,370	100.00
Valid votes		259,370	84.55
Invalid/blank votes		47,400	15.45
Total votes		306,770	100.00
Registered voters/turnout		386,672	79.34
Source: Nohlen

=== National Assembly ===
Party	Seats
National Patriotic Coalition	42
National Liberal Party	11
Total	53
Source: Nohlen
