= Liberal Civic Resistance Party =

Defunct political party in Panama

The Liberal Civil Resistance Party (in Spanish: Partido Resistencia Civil Liberal, PRCL) was a Panamanian centrist liberal political party.

It was founded in 1959 , by Víctor Florencio Goytía , former National Liberal Party leader and its candidate for president in the election, held in 1956.

The party's political guidelines uphold the principles of freedom, humanism, progressive liberalism and social harmony.

In the 1960 elections the PRCL's presidential candidate was Víctor Florencio Goytía; he polled 55,455 votes (22.96%) in the election. In 1964 it allied with the National Opposition Alliance (ANO) and its candidate Juan de Arco Galindo.

The PRCL was abolished by the Electoral Tribunal in 1964.
