= Nationalist Party (Panama) =

The Nationalist Party (Partido Nacionalista, PN) was a Panamanian radical nationalist personalistic political party.

The Nationalist Party was created in 1961 by Aquilino Boyd prior to the 1964 elections after he had lost control of the Third Nationalist Party.

Aquilino Edgardo Boyd de la Guardia, a member of one of the old ruling families and oligarch, he served as foreign minister of Panama (1956–58), permanent representative to the United Nations (1962–76), member of National Assembly for five terms (1948–52, 1956–60, 1960–64, 1964–68, 1968–69), President of the National Assembly (1949). He was one of leaders of the National Patriotic Coalition, in 1959 founded the Third Nationalist Party.

In 1964 PN allied with the National Opposition Union UNO) and its candidate Marco Aurelio Robles.

The PN was abolished by the Electoral Tribunal in 1964.

Aquilino Boyd was one of the first wave of civilian politicians to make peace with the military dictatorship (1968–1989) and who in his capacity as a diplomat and foreign minister played a key role in the negotiations that led to the 1977 Panama Canal Treaties. He served as foreign minister of Panama (1976–77), permanent representative to the United Nations (1985–89, 1997–99), ambassador to the United States (1982–85) and to the United Kingdom (1994–97). In 1979 he became one of leaders of the Liberal Party. He was the COLINA nominee for Second Vice-President of the Panama in 1989.
