= Civil Party =

Civil Party may refer to:

- Civil Party (Costa Rica) (1893—1915)
- Civil Party (Taiwan), minor political party in the Republic of China on Taiwan
- Civilista Party, conservative former political party in Peru
- Independent Civil Party, former political party in Peru

== See also ==
- Civic Party (disambiguation)
