= Civic Party (disambiguation) =

The Civic Party is a liberal democratic political party in Hong Kong.

Civic Party may also refer to:

- Civic Party (Belarus), defunct political party
- Civic Party of Kazakhstan, defunct political party, formerly part of the Agrarian and Industrial Union of Workers Block
- Civic Party of Moldova, defunct political party
- Civic Party of Montenegro, liberal-centrist party in Montenegro
- Civic Party of Montreal, former municipal political party in Quebec, Canada
- Civic Party of Switzerland, alternative name for the Conservative Democratic Party
- Cork Civic Party, active 1945–66 in Cork, Ireland
- Hungarian Civic Party, major right-wing conservative party in Hungary
- Hungarian Civic Party (Romania), political party for Romania's Hungarian ethnic minority

== See also ==
- Civil Party (disambiguation)
- National Civic Party (disambiguation), a name shared by parties in different countries
