= 1945 Panamanian presidential election =

Presidential elections were held in Panama on 15 June 1945. The Constitutional Assembly elected Enrique Adolfo Jiménez as provisional President of the Republic.

== Results ==
Candidate	Party	Votes	%
Enrique Adolfo Jiménez	Liberal Democratic Party	30	73.17
Against		11	26.83
Total		41	100.00
Total votes		41	–
Registered voters/turnout		46	89.13
Source: Pizzurno Gelós & Andrés Araúz
