= Radical Action Party =

The Radical Action Party (in Spanish: Partido Acción Radical, PAR) was a Panamanian small centre-right political party.

It was founded prior to the 1964 elections by Norberto Navarro, ex-minister of Public Works under three presidents, a former leading member of the Authentic Revolutionary Party. He was the vice-presidential candidate under Roberto Chiari in 1952 against Jose Remon. Navarro founded the Independent Revolutionary Party (PRI), which was abolished in 1953 after José Antonio Remón Cantera put through the law requiring 45000 adherents for legal parties.

For the 1964 elections, the PAR presented its presidential candidate, Norberto Navarro, He hoped to receive President Roberto Chiari's support. He had faithfully supported Chiari and served as Minister of Housing for four years. Navarro had been Chiari's running mate in 1952. Chiari ultimately supported his cousin instead who won by a very slim margin. Chiari's action undercut Navarro's support; he was unsuccessful in the presidential elections, obtaining 3,708 votes (01.14%).

Norberto's younger brother, Oscar Navarro, was elected once again as Diputado to the National Assembly. He served for several terms.

The PAR was abolished by the Electoral Tribunal in 1964.
