= Escolastico Calvo =

Panamanian journalist and editor

Escolastico Calvo was a Panamanian journalist and editor. He was an editor of the Panamanian newspaper La Hora when he was shot by politician Aquilino Boyd after running a scathing editorial. Under Manuel Noriega, he managed government controlled media. After the United States invasion of Panama, he was detained by U.S. forces.

== See also ==
- The Panama Deception
