= Bernardino González Ruiz =

Panamanian politician and physician

Bernardino Gonzáles Ruíz

Acting President of Panama
- In office 17 March 1963 – 23 March 1963
- President: Roberto Chiari

Personal details
- Born: 11 January 1911 Las Tablas, Panama
- Died: 15 March 2012 (aged 101) Panama City, Panama

Bernardino González Ruíz (11 January 1911 – 15 March 2012) was a Panamanian politician and physician. He served as the President of Panama for six days from 17 to 23 March 1963. He was also the founder of the Democratic Action Party, a conservative Panamanian political party.

== Life and career ==
González Ruíz was born in the city of Las Tablas, Los Santos, Panama, on 11 January 1911.

González Ruíz, who was serving as Minister of State, served as acting President of Panama whilst President Roberto Chiari and Bernardino's brother Sergio, who was First Vice-President, were both out of the country. He was sworn into office on 17 March 1963, at 9:00 a.m. The oath of office was administrated by Julio Mercado in the Yellow Room (Salón Amarillo) of the Palacio de las Garzas. The ceremony was attended by members of the Panamanian cabinet and members of the legislature and the judiciary. González appointed Ricardo E. Chiari as Foreign Minister and Don Nicanor Villalaz as the Minister of Labor, Social Welfare and Public Health. His mandate as President lasted just six days and he left office on 23 March 1963.

González Ruíz served as Panama's Envoy to the United Kingdom. He also served as the President of the National Assembly of Panama for Chiriquí Province and Los Santos Province. Additionally, Gonzalez returned to the federal cabinet, holding the portfolio as Minister of Labor, Health and Welfare. Later in life, Gonzalez became the honorary chairman of the Nationalist Republican Liberal Movement, a center-right political party.

González Ruíz died on 15 March 2012, at the age of 101 years, 64 days. He had not suffered from any known illnesses at the time. González Ruíz was the last surviving Panamanian President from the era prior to the 1968 military coup, which began a military dictatorship lasting from 1968 to 1989.

The government of Panama declared three days of national mourning until 19 March 2012. All flags were ordered to fly at half-mast for the three-day period. González's funeral was held on 17 March 2012, at the Church of San Lucas at Colegio San Agustín in Costa del Este, Panama. His burial was held later in the day from the Iglesia de Santa Librada in Las Tablas, Los Santos.

Political offices
Preceded by Roberto Chiari as President of Panama	Acting President of Panama; 17–23 March 1963	Succeeded by Roberto Chiari as President of Panama
