= Democratic Action Party (Panama) =

Panamanian political party

The Democratic Action Party (Partido Acción Democrático, PAD) was a Panamanian conservative political party.

The Democratic Action Party was founded by Bernardino González Ruíz, in 1963. It was formed by ex-members of the Popular Union Party. Conservative businessmen are among its leadership.

Bernardino González Ruíz was a Panamanian politician and National Assembly deputy (1948–1952, 1952–1956, Popular Union Party), Minister of Labor, Social Welfare and Public Health in the Cabinet of President Roberto Francisco Chiari Remón. He was the brother of Sergio González Ruíz, who was Panamanian Vice-President (1960–1962) and the Popular Union Party candidate for President in the election, held in 1948. In 1963 Bernardino González Ruíz relinquished 1964 presidential aspirations and accepted the temporary post of the interim Presidency. His acceptance simultaneously eliminated his brother's candidacy, since under the constitution no immediate next-of-kin may run for the office within the same period. (The vacuum of the power has arisen after the First Vice-President Sergio González Ruíz cagily arranged a European trip to coincide with the President Roberto Francisco Chiari Remón departure, and Second Vice-President José Dominador Bazán absolutely refused to accept the interim Presidency).

In 1964 it allied with the National Opposition Union (UNO) and its candidate Marco Aurelio Robles. In 1968 it allied with the National Union (UN) and its candidate Arnulfo Arias Madrid.

The PAD was abolished after the 1968 Panamanian coup d'état.
