= National Progressive Party (Panama) =

The Progressive National Party (in Spanish: Partido Progresista Nacional, PPN) was a Panamanian conservative nationalist, personalistic political party.

The Progressive National Party was created by Carlos Sucre Calvo in 1959. The PPN left the National Patriotic Coalition and registered as separate political parties.

Carlos Sucre Calvo was a faction leader in the National Patriotic Coalition during José Antonio Remón Cantera's tenure, and later served as education minister in Ernesto de la Guardia (1958–1959) cabinet and Marco Aurelio Robles' (1966–1967 and 1968) cabinet.

In 1960, PPN allied with the Popular Alliance (AP) and its candidate Víctor Florencio Goytía. In 1964, PPN allied with the National Opposition Union (UNO) and its candidate Marco Aurelio Robles. In 1964, PPN allied with the People's Alliance (ADP) and its candidate David Samudio Ávila.

The PPN was abolished after a military coup in 1968.
