= National Civic Party =

National Civic Party may refer to:

- National Civic Party (Hungary)
- National Civic Party (Panama)

== See also ==
- National Civic Veterans Party, Dominican Republic
