= Independent Civil Party =

The Independent Civil Party (in Spanish: Partido Civil Independiente) was a political party in Peru. It was founded in 1911 as a splinter of the Civilista Party. The president of the party was Enrique Barreda y Osma.
