= Trans-Isthmian Highway =

Major highway in Panama

Route information
- Existed: 1943–present

Location
- Country: Panama

Highway system
- Transport in Panama

The Trans-Isthmian Highway (Highway #3), also known as the Boyd-Roosevelt Highway, is a major highway in Panama, running 85.7 km (53.3 mi). It connects Panama City of the Pacific coast to Colón, on the Atlantic coast. It runs across the Isthmus of Panama.

Made in collaboration by the Americans and Panamanians, the Trans-Isthmian Highway was a WWII-era construction. It ran outside of the Panama Canal Zone, but the countries both agreed on its importance; the Trans-Isthmian Highway was built for the possible defense of the Panama Canal.

The Trans-Isthmian Highway is a free (libre) route. The quicker, more modern Don Alberto Motta Highway has the same function as the Trans-Isthmian, though it does have fees to pay.

At its southern terminus, the Trans-Isthmian Highway intersects with the Inter-American Highway near Panamá City.
