= National Civic Party (Panama) =

Former Panamanian minor political party

The National Civic Party (in Spanish: Partido Cívico Nacional, PCN) was a Panamanian small liberal political party.

It was founded in 1964. For the 1964 elections, PCN allied with the National Opposition Alliance (ANO) and its candidate Juan de Arco Galindo. The PCN polled only 1,079 votes (00.34%) and was abolished by the Electoral Tribunal.
