= José Ramón Guizado =

17th President of Panama (Jan-Mar 1955)

17th President of Panama
- In office 2 January 1955 – 29 March 1955
- Vice President: Ricardo Arias
- Preceded by: José Antonio Remón Cantera
- Succeeded by: Ricardo Arias

Personal details
- Born: José Ramón Guizado Valdés; 13 August 1899 Panama Department, Colombia (now Panama)
- Died: 2 November 1964 (aged 65) United States
- Party: National Patriotic Coalition
- Education: Vanderbilt University
- Profession: Politician

José Ramón Guizado Valdés (13 August 1899 – 2 November 1964) was the 17th President of Panama. He belonged to the National Patriotic Coalition (CNP).

== Education ==
Guizado is an alumnus of Vanderbilt University, having earned a Bachelor of Engineering from the university in 1920. Prior to his political career, Guizado made a fortune as a construction engineer.

== Career ==
He served as Arnulfo Arias' Second Vice President from 1949 to 1951 and Alcibíades Arosemena's First Vice President from 1951 to 1952, as well as Minister of Foreign Affairs, a title under which he participated in treaty negotiations directly with the United States. These negotiations covered the United States' use of the Panama Canal.

José became the president after his predecessor, José Antonio Remón Cantera, was assassinated.

=== Remón Cantera affair ===
In 1955, during a trial from the National Assembly of Panama, Guizado was charged with the second degree murder of his presidential predecessor, José Antonio Remón Cantera. Cantera was assassinated on January 2, 1955 by machine gun fire at the Juan Franco Racetrack in Panama. The suspected assassin, Ruben Miro, confessed to the murder and implicated Guizado, asserting that he had known about the plot. Guizado, his son, and his business partners Radolfo Saint Malo and Tomas Nieves Perez were sentenced to house arrest and brought to jail the following day. Guizado was declared guilty as an accomplice and sentenced to six years and eight months in prison. Two years later, Ruben Miro was acquitted of the murder charge for the assassination, and Guizado was exonerated and released from prison, reclaiming the rights and privileges of a former Panamanian president.

== Personal life ==
Guizado married his wife, Maria Paredes Guizado, in 1924. They had a son and a daughter. Guizado enjoyed playing golf and watching baseball. He died of a heart attack in bed at the Di Lido Hotel in Miami Beach at the age of 66.

Political offices
Preceded by Alcibíades Arosemena	First Vice President of Panama; 1952–1955	Succeeded by Ricardo Arias
Preceded by José Antonio Remón Cantera	President of Panama; January 1955 – March 1955	Succeeded by Ricardo Arias
