= National Reformist Party =

Former political party in Panama

The National Reformist Party (in Spanish: Partido Reformista Nacional, PRN) was a Panamanian small center-left political party.

It was founded by José de la Rosa Castillo, a leader of Local 907 in 1963. The PRN represented an attempt by the Local 907 to enter Panamanian politics.

Local 907, a trade union affiliated to the American AFL–CIO and representing the Panamanian workers on the military bases.

In the 1964 elections the PRN's presidential candidate was José de la Rosa Castillo; he polled 2,521 votes (00.77%) in the election.

The PRN was abolished by the Electoral Tribunal in 1964.

The Local 907 supported the military government of the general Omar Torrijos (1969–1981). Jose de la Rosa Castillo was Minister of Labor in 1971.
