= Revolutionary Isthmian Party =

The Revolutionary Isthmian Party (in Spanish: Partido Istmeño Revolucionario (PIR)) was a Panamanian left-wing political party.

It was founded in 1964 by Álvaro Menéndez Franco. In 1964 this party comprised part of the National Opposition Union that supported Marco Aurelio Robles.

Álvaro Menéndez Franco, a poet and President of the National Council of Writers of Panama, a formerly presided over the Panama City Council, was the leader of National Action Vanguard (VAN). The VAN is known to be financed from Havana. The VAN was only one of the more than twenty Communist-front organizations that were active in the flag war.

The name of Álvaro Menéndez Franco also appeared on the ballot of the PIR for deputy in the Panamá Province (1964).

In 1964 the PIR polled 933 votes (00.29%) and was abolished by the Electoral Tribunal.
