= DIPAL Party =

Defunct political party in Panama

DIPAL Party (Discipline, Equality, Patriotism, Love, and Liberty), (in Spanish: Partido DIPAL, PD, Disciplina, Igualdad, Patriotismo, Amor y Libertad) was a Panamanian political party.

The DIPAL Party was created by Alfredo Alemán, in 1959 "as a non-political organization to foster better relations between negroes and whites in Panama".

Alfredo Alemán was a National Guard major under Commandant José Antonio Remón Cantera and later served as Minister of Finance in Remon's cabinet.

In 1960 it allied with the Popular Alliance and its candidate Víctor Florencio Goytía. In 1964 it allied with the National Opposition Alliance (ANO) and its candidate Juan de Arco Galindo.

In 1964 the PD registered as a political party, joining the ANO, but polled barely 3000 votes.

The PD was abolished by the Electoral Tribunal in 1964.
