= National Patriotic Coalition =

National Patriotic Coalition Coalición Patriótica Nacional
- Founded: 1952
- Dissolved: 1981
- Merged into: Nationalist Republican Liberal Movement
- Headquarters: Panama City, Panama
- Ideology: Panamanian nationalism Conservatism
- Political position: Centre-right to right-wing

The National Patriotic Coalition (in Spanish: Coalición Patriótica Nacional, CPN) was a Panamanian conservative nationalist political party.

It was founded in advance of the election of 1952 to support the presidential aspirations of Colonel José Antonio Remón Cantera, head of the National Police. Its six original members were the Renewal Party (PREN), Liberal Party "del Matadero" (PL), National Revolutionary Party (PNR), Authentic Revolutionary Party (PRA), Popular Union Party (PUP) and Patriotic Youth Front (FJP). In 1953 the CPN, a coalition of several parties, was reorganized as a single party. It was the government party during José Antonio Remón Cantera's presidency and continued to be one of the principal parties until the late 1960s.

The ideology of CPN was vague: it supported the developmentalist and reformist policies of the Remón government (1952–1955), following Remón's assassination in 1955, supported the conservative Ricardo Arias government (1955–1956) and Ernesto de la Guardia government (1956–1960), which dismantled many of Remón's progressive reforms, and in the early 1960s included among its deputies in the National Assembly Thelma King, who for a while was one of the principal advocates of Castroist tendencies in Panama.

The CPN was the official government party from its formation in 1952 until 1960. In the 1956 elections the CPN's presidential candidate was Ernesto de la Guardia; he polled 177,633 votes (68.49%) in the election.

Meantime, the CPN, undisturbed by any effective opposition in the National Assembly, began to suffer serious dissension within its own ranks.

Remón conceived of the CPN as a system whereby political power was wielded by one faction of the official party and then another. De la Guardia abetted friction among the parties in the official coalition. He refused a cabinet post to the CPN faction of First Vice-President Temístocles Díaz Q. Nor was the bloc of seats in the National Assembly allowed the Díaz faction proportionate to its electoral strength. Perhaps as a direct affront to Temístocles Díaz, the President named Gilberto Arias Guardia, a nephew of the former President Arnulfo Arias, to the cabinet. The enmity between Temístocles Díaz and the elder Gilberto Arias was notorious. Gilberto Arias' incorporation into the cabinet did not reflect a shift in party alignments, but it neutralized the Arias news media.

Coincident with the downgrading of Temístocles Díaz and his CPN faction was the upgrading of the Liberal Democrata group. Following Remón's assassination, the former Renewal Party (PREN) faction under Ricardo Arias guided the CPN, but when Ernesto de la Guardia was elected president, he lured the Liberal Democrata faction and gave it dominance in the CPN. Formerly a part of the National Liberal Party, the Liberal Democratas had opposed the Remón regime. For having switched to the CPN after the Remón's death, the Liberal Democratas were rewarded with the foreign ministry and the agriculture, commerce, and industry portfolio.

A first formal split in the CPN took place on 27 May 1957 when Temístocles Díaz Q. with 37 prominent members, resigned from the CPN and took with him six deputies of the National Assembly of former Popular Union Party and Authentic Revolutionary Party. The reason for the split was general dissatisfaction with the president's political leadership. On 3 June 1957, Díaz was joined in his stand by former President Alcibíades Arosemena and four ex-cabinet members and formed a new party named the National Liberation Movement to oppose de la Guardia. This was a severe blow to the political supporters of President. The formation of the National Liberation Movement led by Temístocles Díaz Q. created additional problems for the disintegrating CPN. The de la Guardia administration generally tended to be overwhelmed by its domestic problems and the rapid pace of events in foreign affairs.

In 1958, Aquilino Boyd withdrew his faction and created the Third Nationalist Party, which joined the PLN coalition. In 1959 the former PREN faction, the faction of Alfredo Alemán and the faction of Carlos Sucre Calvo, who was a faction leader in the CPN during Remón's tenure, left the CPN and registered as separate political parties (Renewal Party, DIPAL Party and Progressive National Party).

In 1960 Ricardo Arias, the candidate of CPN, unsuccessfully ran in the presidential elections, obtaining only 85,981 votes (35.61%).

In 1963 former Popular Union Party faction, led by Bernardino González Ruíz, left the CPN and registered as the Democratic Action Party.

For the 1964 elections, the CPN was the main component of the National Opposition Alliance (ANO), with the CPN's Juan de Arco Galindo as the coalition's presidential candidate. He polled 47,753 votes (14.62%) and came third. In 1968 CPN allied with the National Union (UN) and its candidate Arnulfo Arias, the CPN polled only 19,072 votes (5.95%).

All political parties including the CPN were banned by Omar Torrijos after the military coup of 1968.

In 1981 the CPN joined the Third Nationalist Party, National Liberation Movement and factions that had earlier split off from National Liberal Party and Republican Party to form the opposition National Liberal Republican Movement (MOLIRENA).
