= Enrique Adolfo Jiménez =

23rd Constitutional President of the Republic of Panama (1888–1970)

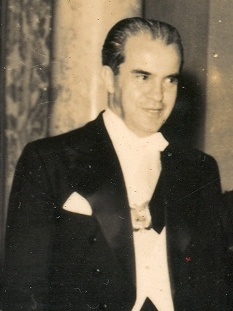
- Jiménez in 1946.

President of Panama
- In office 15 June 1945 – 7 August 1948
- Vice President: Ernesto de la Guardia; Raúl Jiménez
- Preceded by: Ricardo de la Guardia
- Succeeded by: Domingo Díaz Arosemena

Personal details
- Born: Enrique Adolfo Jiménez Brin; 8 February 1888 Panama City, Panama Department, Colombia (now in Panama)
- Died: 28 April 1970 (aged 82) Panama
- Party: National Liberal Party
- Profession: Politician, ambassador
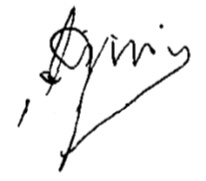
- Signature

Enrique Adolfo Jiménez Brin (8 February 1888 – 28 April 1970) was President of Panama from 15 June 1945 to 7 August 1948, representing the National Liberal Party of Panama.

Jiménez Brin was appointed private secretary of President Belisario Porras Barahona at the age of 25, deputy Minister of State, president of the National Bank of Panama and ambassador of Panama to the United States at Washington, D.C., an important post due to the authority exercised by the U.S. over Panama due to its ownership of the Panama Canal.

He was elected the first presidential designate by the National Assembly for the 1924–1926 term and a second time for the 1934–1936 term.

In June 1945, he was appointed president of the Republic of Panama by the Constituent National Assembly, and remained in office until 7 August 1948.

== Achievements ==
During his term in office, Jiménez's achievements included:

- Tocumen International Airport was constructed
- The Colón Free Trade Zone was created
- The Felix Olivares school in Chiriquí Province and Abel Bravorew school in Colón were established
- The School of Mechanical Currency Arts was created
- New buildings for the Artes y Oficos school were added
- Legislation supporting education and university autonomy were written
- Promoted commercial development, such as the university city and the Hotel El Panama (which later became the Panama Hilton)

Among his notable books are:

- Reminicencias Politicas (Political Reminiscences)
- For History and Memories

== Significance to Panama ==
- He is patriarch of one Panama's most recognized and honorable families, who remain involved in politics
- Enrique Adolfo Jiménez Airport in Colón, Panama was named for him

Political offices
Preceded by Ricardo Adolfo de la Guardia	President of Panama; 1945–1948	Succeeded by Domingo Díaz Arosemena
