= Socialist Party (Panama) =

Socialist Party Partido Socialista
- Abbreviation: PS
- Leader: Demetrio Augusto Porras
- Founded: 1933
- Dissolved: 1970s?
- Split from: PL
- Headquarters: Panama City
- Ideology: Socialism; Factions: Trotskyism; Social democracy

The Socialist Party (in Spanish: Partido Socialista, PS) was a Panamanian left-wing political party created in 1933 by intellectuals and labor unionists who split off from the Liberal Party and rejected the Communist Party.

The PS was led by Demetrio Augusto Porras, whose father, former President of the Republic Belisario Porras Barahona, had created Panama's first broad-based political movement in the early part of the century, by organizing blacks and urban workers.

The PS initially went under the name Partido Socialista Marxista. However, it eventually dropped the "Marxista" label which often provoked its conservative opposition. In 1935 the party was joined by a small group of Trotskyites headed by Diógenes de la Rosa.

In the 1930s, Porras had widespread support among the workers of Panama City and the party seemed to have potential for becoming one of the republic's major political forces. The Socialist Party challenged the Communist domination of the labor movement. Although the contest often involved demonstrations and violence, the socialists failed to gain much influence over the trade unions.

For a number of years the Socialists and Communists fought for control of organized labor. In 1940 groups under both Socialist and Communist influence established the “Organización Sindical”, which 5 years later, on 14 August 1945, sponsored a congress that established the country's first central labor group, the Trade Union Federation of Workers of Panama (Federación Sindical de Trabajadores de Panamá, FSTP). It remained united until 1948, when the rival General Union of Workers (Unión General de Trabajadores) was created under Socialist leadership, after losing control of the FSTP to the Communists. Panamanian socialists played a decisive role in the organization of the unions and in the formation of peasants' associations.

In 1936 PS allied with the Popular Front (FP) and its candidate Domingo Díaz Arosemena. In 1940 the Socialists supported Ricardo J. Alfaro as presidential for the Popular Front.

In 1940, soon after the election of Arnulfo Arias to the presidency for the first time, the Socialist leaders participated in a conspiracy to oust him. When this failed, Demetrio Porras and José Brouwer, two of the party's principal leaders, went into exile in Chile.

With the overthrow of Arias in 1941, the party was given a seat in the cabinet of President Ricardo Adolfo de la Guardia Arango. Porras was sent as Panamanian ambassador to London, where he remained until shortly before the election campaign of 1948. Despite his absence the PS elected two members of the National Assembly in the election of 1945: José Brouwer and Diógenes de la Rosa, an outspoken critic of imperialism, who had led the rent protests.

The two defended the right to organize union activities, a right the projected Constitution had barely touched upon. And when the Assembly assumed legislative power, de la Rosa and Brewer were instrumental in obtaining passage of a Labor Code and of laws regarding education and university autonomy.

In 1948 Demetrio Porras unsuccessfully ran in the presidential elections, obtaining only 3,075 votes (01.55%) and losing their 2 seats in the National Assembly. As a consequence the Socialists lost their official standing as a legal political party.

The PS did not regain its legal status during the 1950s, but was “the nurturing ground for idealistic youth rebelling against the Spanish-blood oligarchy, known derisively as the “rabiblancos”, or "white tails," who controlled most of Panama's economic and political power. The Party's anti-communism and European-style social democratic platform did not make it immune to red-baiting, and the party was banned from electoral lists in 1953. US military intelligence reports later referred to the Socialists as "Marxist oriented"”.

Manuel Noriega became politically active at this time, and joined the Socialist party's youth wing. He did not stand out as a leader in the movement, preferring instead to stick to his books. But he wrote and published nationalist poems and articles attacking the US presence in Panama as an affront to attacking to Panamanian sovereignty.

The PS re-registered in 1961. However, by that time it had lost most of the importance it had had two decades earlier, it had lost its influence in organized labor. Demetrio Porras retired from the leadership when, with he accepted membership on the nation's Supreme Court in 1961.

Carlos Iván Zúñiga, the leader of the radical wing, became the new party leader.

In 1964 the PS suffered still another split. Although in the election of that year it ran its own candidate, the peasant leader Florencio Harris, a group of members headed by the party president, Ismael Sánchez, broke away to support the candidacy of the National Opposition Union's Marco Aurelio Robles, who won.Florencio Harris unsuccessfully ran in the presidential elections, obtaining only 3,708 votes (01.14%), but PS was able to elect one member to the National Assembly.

During the 1970s, the Socialists were highly critical of government policies and particularly of the supporting role of the Communists.
