= Conservative Party (Panama) =

Conservative Party Partido Conservador
- Founded: 1903
- Dissolved: 26 September 1952
- Split from: Colombian Conservative Party
- Headquarters: Panama City, Panama
- Ideology: Conservatism

Party flag

The Conservative Party (Spanish: Partido Conservador, PC) was a Panamanian political party.

Panama inherited the traditional political parties of Colombia – the Conservative Party and the Liberal Party – which vied against one another from 1903 until the 1920s. The local section, less doctrinaire than its Colombian parent, included most of the new nation's white minority, and was led by Manuel Amador Guerrero who served as the republic's first President. Although Manuel Amador Guerrero actively supported the break with Colombia, most Conservatives had reservations about it. It is described that “the Conservatives had never identified strongly with the independence movement and were not able to develop a mass following. The dominant political focus was rather on divisions within the Liberal Party”. The chief divergence between the two parties' programs was on the question of public instruction, with the Liberal Party favoring an educational system free from church control, and the Conservative Party advocating instruction under church auspices. Aside from this main issue, the parties were becoming rather similar ideologically at the time, with a 1930s article stating “the ideological lines of liberalism and conservatism have never coincided with actual party lines. The real division has always been between the Government party and the Opposition party; and Liberals and Conservatives have figured on both sides. Since the revolution of 2 January 1931, party lines have become more indistinct than ever”. Subsequently, as the party grew more liberal, its ideological differences with the Liberal Party dwindled, and many of its members joined the Liberals or other political organizations. Continuous Liberal Party success after 1912 severely damaged the Conservative Party, and by the 1920s it had ceased to be a serious factor in Panamanian politics. Additionally, by that time, most of the Conservative leaders of the independence generation had died without leaving political heirs.

The PC was abolished by the Electoral Tribunal on 26 September 1952.
