= Ricardo Arias (politician) =

President of Panama (1912–1993)

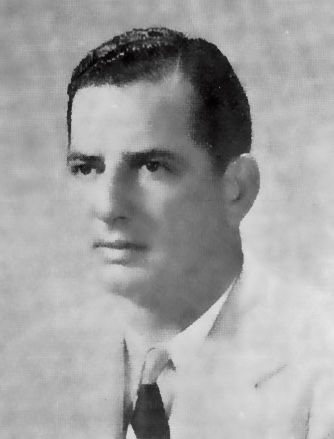

President of Panama
- In office 29 March 1955 – 1 October 1956
- Preceded by: José Ramón Guizado
- Succeeded by: Ernesto de la Guardia

Personal details
- Born: Ricardo Manuel Arias Espinosa; 5 April 1912 Washington, D.C., United States
- Died: 15 March 1993 (aged 80) Panama City, Panama
- Party: National Patriotic Coalition
- Profession: Politician, businessman

Ricardo Manuel Arias Espinosa (5 April 1912 – 15 March 1993) was the 29th President of Panama.

== Biography ==
Born in Washington, D.C., from a prominent Panamanian political family, Arias studied at universities in the United States, Colombia and Chile. He became Second Vice President of Panama in 1952, and served as president from March 29, 1955, to October 1, 1956. He belonged to the National Patriotic Coalition (CNP).

He was President of the National Assembly from 1956 to 1957, and ran as a presidential candidate in 1960. He later served as the Panamanian Ambassador to the United States during the 1960s and in the Board of Directors of numerous companies in Panama. He died on March 15, 1993, in Panama City, of cancer.

He had two sons and two daughters. His son, Ricardo Alberto Arias, has been minister of foreign affairs and the Panamanian ambassador to the United Nations.

Political offices
Preceded by José Ramón Guizado	First Vice President of Panama; 1955	Succeeded by Vacant
Preceded by José Ramón Guizado	President of Panama; 1955–1956	Succeeded by Ernesto de la Guardia
