= Alcibíades Arosemena =

President of Panama (1883–1958)

15th President of Panama
- In office 9 May 1951 – 1 October 1952
- Vice President: José Ramón Guizado
- Preceded by: Arnulfo Arias
- Succeeded by: Jose Antonio Remon Cantera

Personal details
- Born: Alcibíades Arosemena Quinzada; 20 November 1883 Penonomé, Los Santos Province, Panama State, United States of Colombia
- Died: 8 April 1958 (aged 74) Panama
- Party: Authentic Revolutionary Party

Alcibíades Arosemena Quinzada (20 November 1883 – 8 April 1958) was a Panamanian politician, who served 15th President of Panama.

He was elected as the third presidential designate by the National Assembly in 1945.

He served as First Vice President in the cabinet of Arnulfo Arias 1949–1951, and was also President of Panama from 9 May 1951 to 1 October 1952. He belonged to the Authentic Revolutionary Party (PRA).

He was married to Heliodora Arosemena (1886–1980) who was a sister of former president Juan Demóstenes Arosemena.

Political offices
Preceded by Roberto Chiari	First Vice President of Panama; 1949–1951	Succeeded by José Ramón Guizado
Preceded by Arnulfo Arias	President of Panama; 1951–1952	Succeeded by José Antonio Remón
