= Domingo Díaz Arosemena =

Panamanian politician

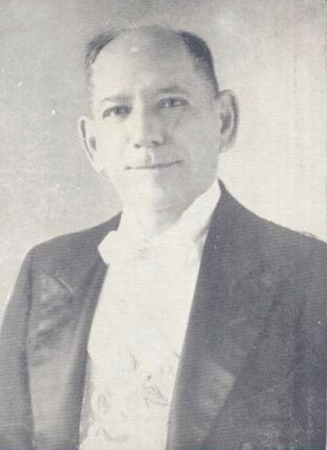

President of Panama
- In office 7 August 1948 – 28 July 1949
- Vice President: Daniel Chanis; Roberto Chiari
- Preceded by: Enrique Adolfo Jiménez
- Succeeded by: Daniel Chanis

Personal details
- Born: Domingo Díaz Arosemena; 25 June 1875 Panama City, United States of Colombia
- Died: August 23, 1949 (aged 74) Panama City, Panama
- Party: National Liberal Party
- Profession: Politician

Domingo Díaz Arosemena (25 June 1875 – 23 August 1949) was a Panamanian politician.

Díaz Arosemena served as Mayor of Panamá District from 1910 to 1912, and he was elected as the first presidential designate by the National Assembly for the term 1932–1934.

He served as President of Panama from August 7, 1948, to July 28, 1949. He suffered a heart attack while in office and resigned, dying less than a month later. He belonged to the Liberal Party.

Political offices
Preceded by Enrique Adolfo Jiménez	President of Panama; 1948–1949	Succeeded by Daniel Chanis
