= Arnulfo Arias =

President of Panama from 1940 to 1941, 1949 to 1951 and in 1968

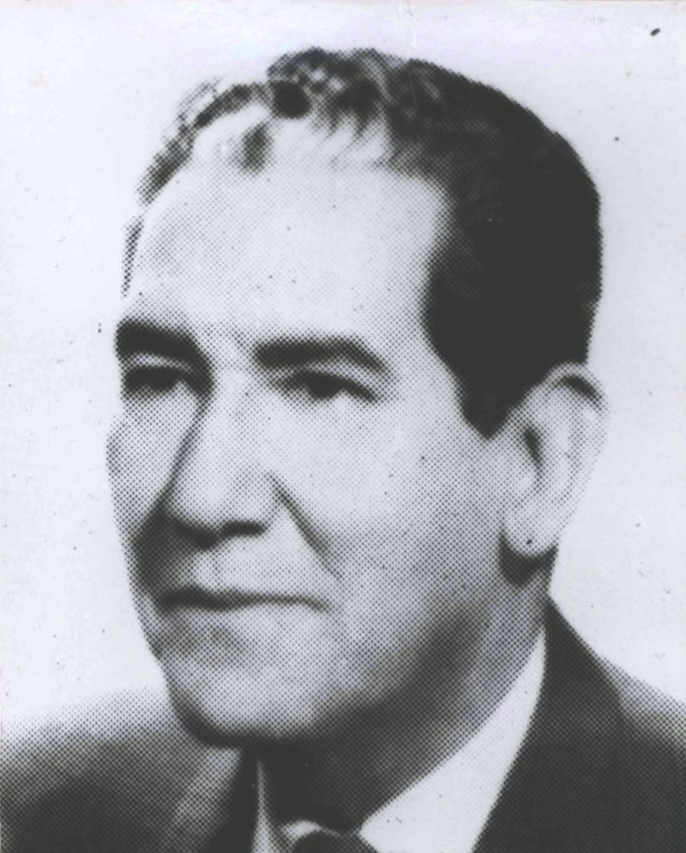
- Arnulfo Arias in 1968

12th, 17th & 25th President of Panama
- In office 1 October 1968 – 11 October 1968
- Vice President: First Vice President; Raúl Arango; Second Vice President; José Dominador Bazán
- Preceded by: Marco Aurelio Robles
- Succeeded by: José María Pinilla; Bolívar Urrutia Parrilla; Omar Torrijos (as Military Leader of Panama)
- In office 24 November 1949 – 9 May 1951
- Vice President: First Vice President; Alcibíades Arosemena; Second Vice President; José Ramón Guizado
- Preceded by: Roberto F. Chiari
- Succeeded by: Alcibíades Arosemena
- In office 1 October 1940 – 9 October 1941
- Vice President: First Vice President; José Pezet Arosemena; Second Vice President; Ernesto Jaén Guardia; Third Vice President; Aníbal Ríos Delgado
- Preceded by: Augusto Samuel Boyd
- Succeeded by: Ricardo de la Guardia

Personal details
- Born: Arnulfo Arias Madrid; 15 August 1901 Penonomé, Panama Department, Colombia
- Died: 10 August 1988 (aged 86) Coral Gables, Miami-Dade County, Florida
- Party: Panameñista Party
- Spouses: Ana Matilde Linares (m. 1927; died 1955) Mireya Moscoso (m. 1969)

Arnulfo Arias Madrid (15 August 1901 – 10 August 1988) was a Panamanian politician, medical doctor, and writer who served as the President of Panama from 1940 to 1941, again from 1949 to 1951, and finally for 11 days in October 1968.

Throughout his adult life, he warned about the increasing influence of the military in Panamanian politics and vowed to reduce that. In turn, he was denied his presidential electoral success in 1948 by the military. Arias's tenure as president was characterized by corruption, nepotism and autocratic practices. In 1951, Arias sought to restore the 1941 constitution and threatened to disband the Panama legislature, which prompted protests. The legislature impeached Arias, who was succeeded by Alcibiades Arosemena.

He was removed from the presidency thrice by the military.

== Background ==
Arnulfo Arias Madrid was born in Penonomé, Coclé Province, on 15 August 1901. He was the son of Antonio Arias and Carmen Madrid, and the brother of Harmodio Arias, who also served as the President of Panama for 13 days in January 1931 and again from 1932 to 1936.

Arias began his studies at the French Christian Brothership (today known as La Salle) in his native city and attended secondary school in New York City. He studied medicine and surgery at Harvard University and the University of Chicago. Later, he specialized in psychiatry, obstetrics and endocrinology.

== Political life ==
In 1925, Arias returned to Panama and assumed leadership of the nationalistic organization Patriotic Communal Action. This organization tapped into a building current of discontent in Panama against the considerable influence the United States exerted on the country. It formed the nucleus of the present-day Panameñista Party.

In 1931, Arias led a coup that deposed Liberal President Florencio Harmodio Arosemena. The following year, he helped his brother Harmodio Arias become president. He subsequently served in the cabinet and on diplomatic posts, including as Panama's ambassador to Italy during Benito Mussolini's reign. In 1940, he was elected president by an unprecedented majority as the candidate of the National Revolutionary Party (PNR, which became the Panameñista Party in the mid-1940s). Soon after taking office, Arias enacted a new constitution that granted women the right to vote for the first time. He was ousted in October 1941, in a coup engineered by the police. Arias was an outspoken nationalist. Since he was formerly Panamanian Ambassador to Fascist Italy this led some to claim he was pro-Axis. With war looming some Washington politicians were leery of Arias ruling Panama. Some historians feel Roosevelt supported his removal from the presidency.

Arias consistently opposed the influence of the police in politics, labeling it as "a cancer" on the body politic. He ran for president once more in 1948 as the candidate of a coalition of his party and the Authentic Revolutionary Party and clearly won but was not allowed to be seated. However, a year later the National Assembly declared that he had actually won. He appointed his long time collaborator, Norberto Navarro, Minister of Public Works. Faced with growing interference by the police, Arias suspended the constitution and created government entities to counter the power of the police. But he failed to curb their power. In 1951 he was overthrown by Colonel José Remón Cantera, Panama City's police chief, the nation did not have an army. Arias fled the country but remained widely popular among the masses. He ran in 1964, then won the 1968 elections as the standard-bearer of a five-party coalition.

Taking office in October, he sought to restructure the command of the National Guard. After only eleven days as president, he was ousted for the third time and undertook a midnight escape to the Canal Zone. Repeating mistakes which occurred in his previous administrations, Arias forgot to destroy records of his corruption and his opposition immediately capitalized. The Presidential Palace was attacked by Omar Torrijos' men. Arias, having seen his guards disappear and after receiving a call from the Costa Rican President José Joaquín Trejos Fernández, warning him that the border had been closed; he left the palace along with Hildebrando Nicosia, his chief of staff.

Nicosia called Michael J. Merry, his son-in-law and manager of a U.S. communications company, and asked him to pick up Arias and three ministers of state at a prearranged location. By that time, military patrols were searching the city for Arias. With the country's leaders and an arsenal of automatic weapons in his vehicle, Merry drove through the military blockade to safety in the Panama Canal Zone, where the headquarters for the government in exile had been prepared.

Since the Canal Zone, an independent political entity, authorities would not allow the weapons to remain in its territory, Merry was forced to bluff his way back to Panama City, through the National Guard border blockade and patrols to safety. Arias and Nicosia later left the Canal Zone to Miami, Florida. His 93-year-old mother, however, was sleeping upstairs, but was unharmed and undisturbed, having taken her hearing aids out to sleep.

After the U.S. pressured military leader Omar Torrijos to liberalize his regime, Arias and Nicosia returned to Panama in 1978. While they were in exile, a small dissident group in Arias's Panameñista Party joined the pro-Torrijos coalition, and took over the party's registration. The majority of the party remained with Arias, renaming itself the Authentic Panameñista Party. It was renamed the Arnulfista Party in 1990, and in 2005 regained its old name, the Panameñista Party.

In 1984, the 83-year-old Arias ran again for president. His campaign was complicated by a book Holocaust in Panama, distributed by Noriega with help from the Israeli Mossad, that fraudulently claimed Arias had arranged a massacre of Jews in 1941. When exit polls showed Arias with a substantial lead, the government, now controlled by Manuel Noriega, halted the count and brazenly manipulated the results to declare that its favored candidate, Nicolás Ardito Barletta, had won by a mere 1,713 votes. Independent observers estimated that Arias would have won in a landslide had the election been conducted in a fair manner. As a result, Barletta was nicknamed Fraudito, portmanteau of "fraud" and his middle name, Ardito. Arias fled once again to Florida. It was the beginning of the Noriega military dictatorship.

== Death ==
On the morning of 10 August 1988, Arias died of a heart attack at his Coral Gables, Miami-Dade County, Florida home. His wife, Mireya Moscoso, was at his side. His death caused national mourning in Panama. Following the transfer of his body to Panama City and an enormous funeral where his supporters protested against Noriega, Arias was buried in Jardin de Paz cemetery (Located in Parque Lefevre) on 15 August, the day of what would have been his 87th birthday.

After his death, Guillermo Endara became the leading opponent of the military dictatorship, heading the opposition coalition in the 1989 presidential election. Despite defeating pro-Noriega candidate Carlos Duque by an overwhelming margin, the results were annulled by the government, and Endara and his running mates were badly beaten in the streets by the paramilitary Dignity Battalions. Seven months later, the United States launched Operation Just Cause and Arias' party regained power shortly afterwards.

On 8 January 2012, 23 years after his death, his remains were exhumed and he was given a state funeral according to his last wish. He was re-buried in a mausoleum close to the Arias Madrid Family Museum, located in the town of Penonomé, Coclé Province, Panama.

Currently, there are monuments, schools, and a township avenue bearing his name.

== Personal life ==
Arias married Ana Matilde Linares in 1927 and they remained together until her death in 1955. In 1969, he married Mireya Moscoso. They remained together until his death. Moscoso later became the first woman President of Panama following the 1999 elections.

During his first marriage, he adopted a son, Gerardo Edilberto Arias (1929–2002).

Political offices
Preceded by Augusto Samuel Boyd	President of Panama; 1940–1941	Succeeded by Ricardo de la Guardia
Preceded by Roberto Chiari	President of Panama; 1949–1951	Succeeded by Alcibíades Arosemena
Preceded by Marco Aurelio Robles	President of Panama; 1 October 1968 – 11 October 1968	Succeeded by José María Pinilla
