= Panameñista Party =

Panameñista Party Partido Panameñista
- President: Jorge Luis Herrera
- Founder: Harmodio Arias Madrid
- Founded: 31 October 1931, PNR; 28 November 1947, PRA; February 1983, PPA; 15 August 1991, PA; January 2005, PP
- Registered: 20 December 1935, PNR
- Preceded by: Acción Comunal
- Headquarters: Ave. Perú y Calle 37, Panama City, Panama
- Membership (2025): ▼225,595
- Ideology: National conservatism; Populism
- Political position: Centre-right to right-wing
- Regional affiliation: Center-Democratic Integration Group
- Continental affiliation: Union of Latin American Parties
- International affiliation: Centrist Democrat International (formerly)
- Colours: Purple, Yellow, Red
- Seats in the National Assembly: 8 / 71
- District Mayors: 22 / 81
- Corregimiento Representatives: 0 / 702
- Seats in the Central American Parliament (Panamanian seats): 1 / 20

Party flag

Website
- panamenistas.org

The Panameñista Party is a nationalist political party in Panama, being the fourth largest party in terms of membership with 225,595 members. Founded by Arnulfo Arias, it has governed the country three times since the fall of the military regime in 1989.

== Founding and early history ==
The party is the oldest continuously operating party in Panama. It was founded in 1931 by Harmodio Arias, a prominent newspaper publisher, and Ezequiel Fernández as the National Revolutionary Party. Its membership largely came from Patriotic Communal Action, a nationalist organization that led a coup in early 1931 to protest the large amount of American influence in Panama. Fernández was the party's first president.

The party first gained a measure of power in the 1936 elections, when Fernández became second vice-president in Juan Demóstenes Arosemena's administration. Arosemena died in office in 1939. As First Vice-president Augusto Samuel Boyd was also serving as Panama's ambassador to the United States, Fernández became acting president for three days until Boyd returned from Washington.

By 1939, the party had been taken over by Harmodio Arias' younger brother, Arnulfo, who would be its face for the next half-century. In the early 1930s, he had begun promoting a nationalist doctrine called "Panameñismo" (Panamanianism), and this became the basis for the party.

Arnulfo Arias, Manuel Solís Palma and Alcibíades Arosemena founded the Authentic Revolutionary Party (Spanish: Partido Revolucionario Auténtico) on 28 November 1947 (dissolved in 1951). It was described as a big tent centrist party (with centre-left factions). The only President to be a member of the ARP was Alcibíades Arosemena, and even Arias and Palma switched parties in later life.

Arnulfo Arias was elected president of the Panameñista Party three times and was deposed by the military each time. After his third ouster, in 1968, a small dissident group broke with Arias to support the military regime of Omar Torrijos. In return, the Torrijos regime allowed the dissidents to take over the party's registration. The main body, however, remained with Arias and renamed itself the Authentic Panameñista Party. Known by its Spanish acronym, "PPA," it was one of the leading opponents to Manuel Noriega. By nearly all accounts, Arias would have won the 1984 presidential election had it been conducted honestly.

== Opposition to Noriega ==
Arnulfo Arias would have been the party's candidate for president in 1989, but he died in 1988. He was succeeded as party leader by his widow, Mireya Moscoso. For the 1989 elections, the party was the main component of an anti-Noriega coalition, with the PPA's Guillermo Endara as the coalition's presidential candidate. Opposition election showed a win for Endara by a 3-to-1 margin over Noriega's candidate, Carlos Duque, but those elections were nullified by Noriega on the grounds of "foreign interference." Noriega was overthrown in the United States invasion of Panama a few months later. The night before the invasion, in the Canal Zone, Endara was sworn in as president by a judge.

== Postwar ==
The government of Guillermo Endara designated the first anniversary of the U.S. invasion a "national day of reflection." On that day, hundreds of Panamanians marked the day with a "black march" through the streets of this capital to denounce the invasion and Endara's economic policies. Protesters echoed claims that 3,000 people had been killed as a result of U.S. military action.

Endara conducted a public hunger strike to call attention to poverty and homelessness left in the wake of the Noriega years and destruction caused by the U.S. invasion. He visited then U.S. President George Bush, pressing for emergency relief aid and cooperative measures to curtail the Panamanian narcotics trade. He is credited with restoring confidence in the banking industry, reducing unemployment, and to addressing narcotrafficking and violent crime. His administration has faced criticism of influence by wealthy businessmen and the U.S. On February 10, 1990, the Endara government abolished Panama's military and reformed the security apparatus by creating the Panamanian Public Forces.

Endara later distanced himself from the party due to differences of opinion with Moscoso. He ran in the 2004 Panamanian presidential election as the candidate of the Solidarity Party. He finished second to Martín Torrijos. In 2007, he founded his own political party Fatherland's Moral Vanguard Party, but it was disbanded two years later.

== Recent history ==
In 1991, the party was renamed the Arnulfista Party in honor of its longtime leader. Party members had been called "Arnulfistas" for many years. It lost the 1994 presidential elections to the Democratic Revolutionary Party (PRD) administration of Ernesto Pérez Balladares, acting as the main opposition party before regaining the presidency in 1999 under Moscoso.

In 1994, a constitutional amendment permanently abolished the military of Panama, replacing it with a small paramilitary force (the Panamanian Public Forces).

At the 2004 elections, the party won 19.2% of the popular vote and 17 out of 78 seats. In presidential elections held the same day, its candidate, José Miguel Alemán, finished a poor third, with 16.4% of the vote.

The Arnulfista Party changed its name to the Panameñista Party (after the name it had a few decades earlier) in 2005.

On October 2, 2016, José Luis Varela was elected President of the Panameñista Party.

=== Moscoso and press restrictions ===
Moscoso included in her platform a pledge to work to repeal press restrictions dating to the Torrijos era that criminalized criticism of public officials and permitted prior censorship; in 1999 she signed a bill that mandated the submission of legislation to bring Panama's press laws in line with international standards by June 2000. This legislation was not forthcoming, but government disclosure laws were passed in 2001. Lawsuits against journalists continued; even President Moscoso, along with Winston Spadafora, the former minister of government and justice and a current Supreme Court justice, filed a criminal defamation suit. In 2005, many of the 'gag laws' enacted under military rule in the 1960s were repealed by new president Martin Torrijos.

=== 2009 elections ===
Presidential and legislative elections were held in Panama on May 3, 2009. Juan Carlos Varela was the candidate of the Panameñista Party, but eventually supported Ricardo Martinelli in a coalition of four parties, led by Martinelli's Democratic Change party. With 60% of the vote, Martinelli went on to beat the incumbent Democratic Revolutionary Party who had formed its own three-party coalition. Varela, the Panameñista leader, became Panama's vice president to President Martinelli. Former 1990's president Guillermo Endara placed a distant third with 2.3% of the vote as the official candidate for the new Fatherland's Moral Vanguard Party, after gaining 31% in the last elections (2004).

Martinelli's and Varela's Alliance for Change coalition also dominated the National Assembly in 2009, winning 44 seats against 27 of the second-place coalition, with 2 other seats belonging to independents. A total of 22 legislative seats went specifically to the Panameñista Party.

However, the alliance had split by 2011, and a number of members from the Panameñista Party joined the Democratic Change Party, leaving the Panameñista Party with a remnant of 12 legislative seats.

=== 2014 elections ===
Juan Carlos Varela was the Panameñista Party's candidate once again for the 2014 general election. The election polls had him ranked third in a field of six candidates for almost the entire campaign period, but Varela ran a very good campaign with a steady and strong message that touched the most important issue for Panamanians. On May 4, 2014, Juan Carlos Varela was elected President of Panama with a healthy 39% of the votes in what turned out to be a three-man race.
