= Ernesto de la Guardia =

President of Panama (1904–1983)

President of Panama
- In office 1 October 1956 – 1 October 1960
- Vice President: Temistocles Díaz; Heraclio Barletta
- Preceded by: Ricardo Arias
- Succeeded by: Roberto Chiari

Personal details
- Born: Ernesto de la Guardia Navarro; 30 May 1904 Panama City, Panama
- Died: 2 May 1983 (aged 78) Panama City, Panama
- Party: National Patriotic Coalition
- Profession: Politician

Ernesto de la Guardia Navarro (30 May 1904 – 2 May 1983) was president of Panama from 1 October 1956 to 1 October 1960. He was a member of the National Patriotic Coalition (CNP).

== Early life and education ==
Born in Panama City, he was educated at Dartmouth College in the United States, where he obtained a master's degree in finance.

== Political career ==
He began his political career as a consul in the Costa Rican consulate in San Francisco. Prior to his administration, he held diplomatic positions, as well as serving as secretary of state and First Vice President from 1945 to 1948. He was considered a visionary of the Electoral Tribunal and other constitutional reforms, he earned a reputation as a leading advocate for Panamian democracy. During his administration, he was involved in disputes with the United States involving interpretations of the treaties regarding the Panama Canal Zone. On 26 April 1959, he faced an attempted coup planned by diplomat Roberto Arias, nephew of deposed ex-president Arnulfo Arias and husband of famous British ballerina Margot Fonteyn. The coup, allegedly sponsored by Fidel Castro, was suppressed with help from the United States and other American countries.

== Personal life ==
Navarro was married to Mercedes Galindo; they had two sons and a daughter.

== Later life and death ==
After vacating the presidency, he was a member of the Academia Panameña de la Lengua (directing it in 1973 2), and directed the weekly Mundo Gráfico. He died in Panama City in 1983 at the age of 78.

Political offices
Preceded by Jeptha Duncan	First Vice President of Panama; 1945–1948	Succeeded by Daniel Chanis
Preceded by Ricardo Arias	President of Panama; 1956–1960	Succeeded by Roberto Chiari
