= Roberto Francisco Chiari Remón =

President of Panama (1905–1981)

Roberto Chiari
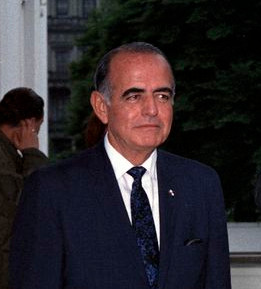
- Roberto Chiari in 1962

President of Panama
- In office 20 November 1949 – 24 November 1949
- Preceded by: Daniel Chanis
- Succeeded by: Arnulfo Arias
- In office 1 October 1960 – 1 October 1964
- Vice President: Sergio González Ruíz; José Dominador Bazán
- Preceded by: Ernesto de la Guardia
- Succeeded by: Marco Aurelio Robles

Personal details
- Born: Roberto Francisco Chiari Remón; 2 March 1905 Panama City, Panama
- Died: 1 March 1981 (aged 75) Panama City, Panama
- Party: National Liberal Party
- Profession: Politician

Roberto Francisco Chiari Remón (March 2, 1905 – March 1, 1981) was the President of Panama in 1949 and from 1960 to 1964. He belonged to the Liberal Party.

== Before being president ==
He was president of the Chamber of Commerce. He worked in the sugar company of his family with his father Rodolfo Chiari and brothers. He was the only one of his brothers that was interested on politics. He was elected to the National Assembly in 1940. During the Ricardo de la Guardia administration he was Minister of Health and Public Works. He was one of Domingo Díaz Arosemena's vice presidents and briefly served as acting president in 1949. He lost the presidential elections of 1952. He was president of his Liberal Party for the next 8 years.

== 1960 election ==
He was elected in a clean and peaceful election. He was campaigning against former president Ricardo Arias and Victor Goytia.

== Administration ==
Chiari's government worked hard on the education sector. The General Hospital of the Social Security was inaugurated and an extensive vaccination program developed.

His administration is most remembered for the historic events of January 9, 1964, known today as Martyrs' Day. During a dispute between Panamanian and American students regarding the right to raise the Panamanian flag instead of the U.S. flag at Balboa High School, the Panamanian flag was accidentally torn. This flag desecration sparked four days of fighting between civilians and the US Army. 22 Panamanians and four Americans died. Following these events, Chiari made the decision to break diplomatic relations with the United States, making Panama the first Latin American country to make this call. This spurred negotiations that ultimately ended in the 1977 Torrijos-Carter Treaties, which disbanded the Canal Zone and relinquished U.S. control of the Panama Canal to Panama on December 31, 1999. Because of this, Chiari is known as el presidente de la dignidad (The President of Dignity).

== Post-presidency ==
After leaving office, Chiari retired from public life and returned to work in his private companies. He was president of the Industrial Sindicate from 1967 to 1969.

Political offices
Preceded by Daniel Chanis	First Vice President of Panama; 1949	Succeeded by Alcibíades Arosemena
Preceded by Daniel Chanis	President of Panama; November 20, 1949 – November 24, 1949	Succeeded by Arnulfo Arias
Preceded by Ernesto de la Guardia	President of Panama; 1960–1964	Succeeded by Marco Aurelio Robles
