= José Antonio Remón Cantera =

29th President of Panama (1952-55)

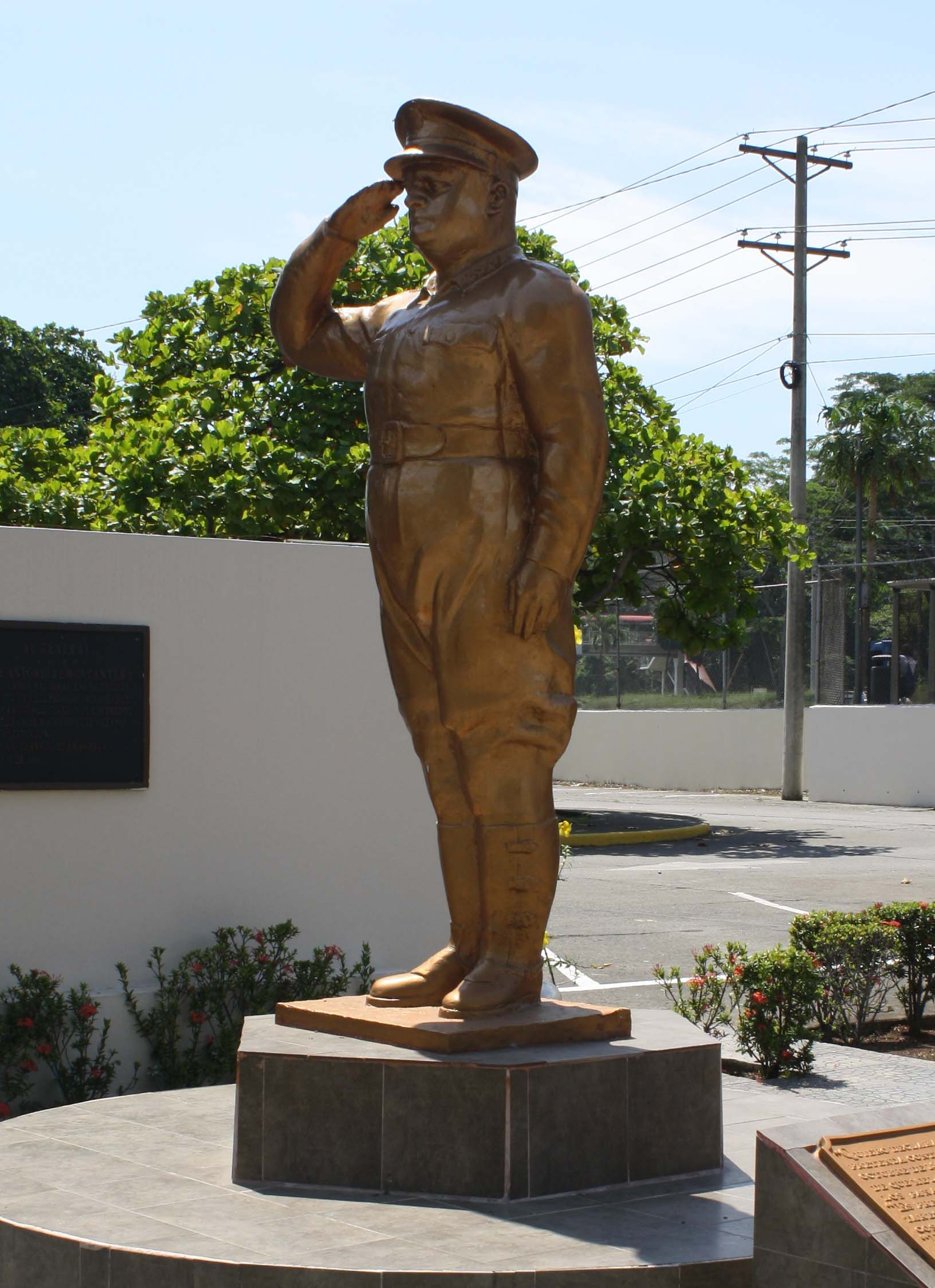
- Statue of José Antonio Remón Cantera outside of HQ of the National Police of Panama

16th President of Panama
- In office 1 October 1952 – 2 January 1955
- Vice President: José Ramón Guizado; Ricardo Arias
- Preceded by: Alcibíades Arosemena
- Succeeded by: José Ramón Guizado

Personal details
- Born: José Antonio Remón Cantera; 11 April 1908 Panama City, Panama
- Died: 2 January 1955 (aged 46) Panama City, Panama
- Party: National Patriotic Coalition
- Spouse: Cecilia Pinel
- Profession: Military, politician

Colonel José Antonio Remón Cantera (11 April 1908 – 2 January 1955) was the 16th President of Panama, holding office from 1 October 1952 until his death on January 2, 1955. He was Panama's first military strongman and ruled the country behind the scenes in the late 1940s. He belonged to the National Patriotic Coalition (CNP), and was its candidate for president in May 1952.

He joined the National Police in 1931, becoming its chief in 1947. In this position, he was responsible for the coup against acting president Daniel Chanis Pinzón.

Beginning in 1953, his administration began to negotiate amendments to the Panama Canal treaty with the U.S. administration of President Dwight D. Eisenhower. These negotiations led to an agreement, ratified in 1955, that substantially raised the annual annuity paid to Panama (from $430,000 to $1.9 million) and resulted in the handover of approximately $20 million in property from the Panama Canal Company to Panama.

General José Remón was the strong man behind the scenes during the 1940s. He engineered several coups that ousted Dr. Arnulfo Arias and two other presidents from power. "Neither millions nor alms – we want justice" was Remón's most memorable statement of principles. In 1952 Remón went on to be "elected" President of Panama in a very questionable election replete with many clear examples of fraud and police interference in Remon's favor.

He was Panama's first military strong man, deposing and appointing presidents as he desired. After eschewing political positions, he turned around and ran for president in 1952. The opposition was bullied and persecuted during the campaign and on election day. He was declared the winner in May 1952. On 2 January 1955, Remón was ambushed at a race track and fired upon by three assailants armed with sub-machine guns. The incident took place at 7:30 pm; Remón died in hospital two hours later. Two other men were killed in the attack, including one of Remón's bodyguards.

== Murder investigation ==
The circumstances concerning Remón's death were mysterious. During the initial investigation, an American, Martin Irving Lipstein, was arrested, but later released when Rubén O. Miró, an attorney, confessed to the crime on 12 January 1955. Lipstein also had an alibi, with several witnesses having seen him in places far away from the racetrack at which Remón was killed (the Hipódromo Juan Franco), at about the same time.

In his confession, Miró claimed that he had been acting on orders from José Ramón Guizado, who had succeeded Remón as president. Guizado was removed from his post and arrested on 15 January, and convicted of complicity on 29 March.

He denied any complicity but after a highly emotional trial, he was sentenced to six years and eight months in jail. He was released in December 1957 after Miró and six other suspected perpetrators were acquitted. The murder was never solved. Guizado moved to Spain and claimed his complete innocence all his life. Miró, the son of a Supreme Court judge, was abducted in broad daylight as he exited a bank in downtown Panama City. He was never seen again.

== See also ==
- Remon–Eisenhower Treaty

Political offices
Preceded by Alcibíades Arosemena	President of Panama; 1952–1955	Succeeded by José Ramón Guizado
