= National Liberal Party (Panama) =

National Liberal Party Partido Liberal Nacional
- Founded: 1903
- Dissolved: May 14, 2009
- Split from: Colombian Liberal Party
- Merged into: Patriotic Union (factions); National Patriotic Coalition (factions)
- Headquarters: Panama City, Panama
- Ideology: Liberalism
- Political position: Centre
- International affiliation: Liberal International (observer)

Party flag

The National Liberal Party (Spanish: Partido Liberal Nacional, PLN) was a liberal party in Panama. The party was an observer at Liberal International.

The party was formed in 1903 out of the Panamanian branch of the Colombian Liberal Party, shortly after Panama declared independence.

The PLN merged with Solidarity Party (Partido Solidaridad) to form the new Patriotic Union Party (Unión Patriótica) in 2009.

== See also ==
- Liberalism worldwide
- List of liberal parties
- Liberalism in Panama
