= Museum of History of Panama =

- Museo de Historia de Panamá
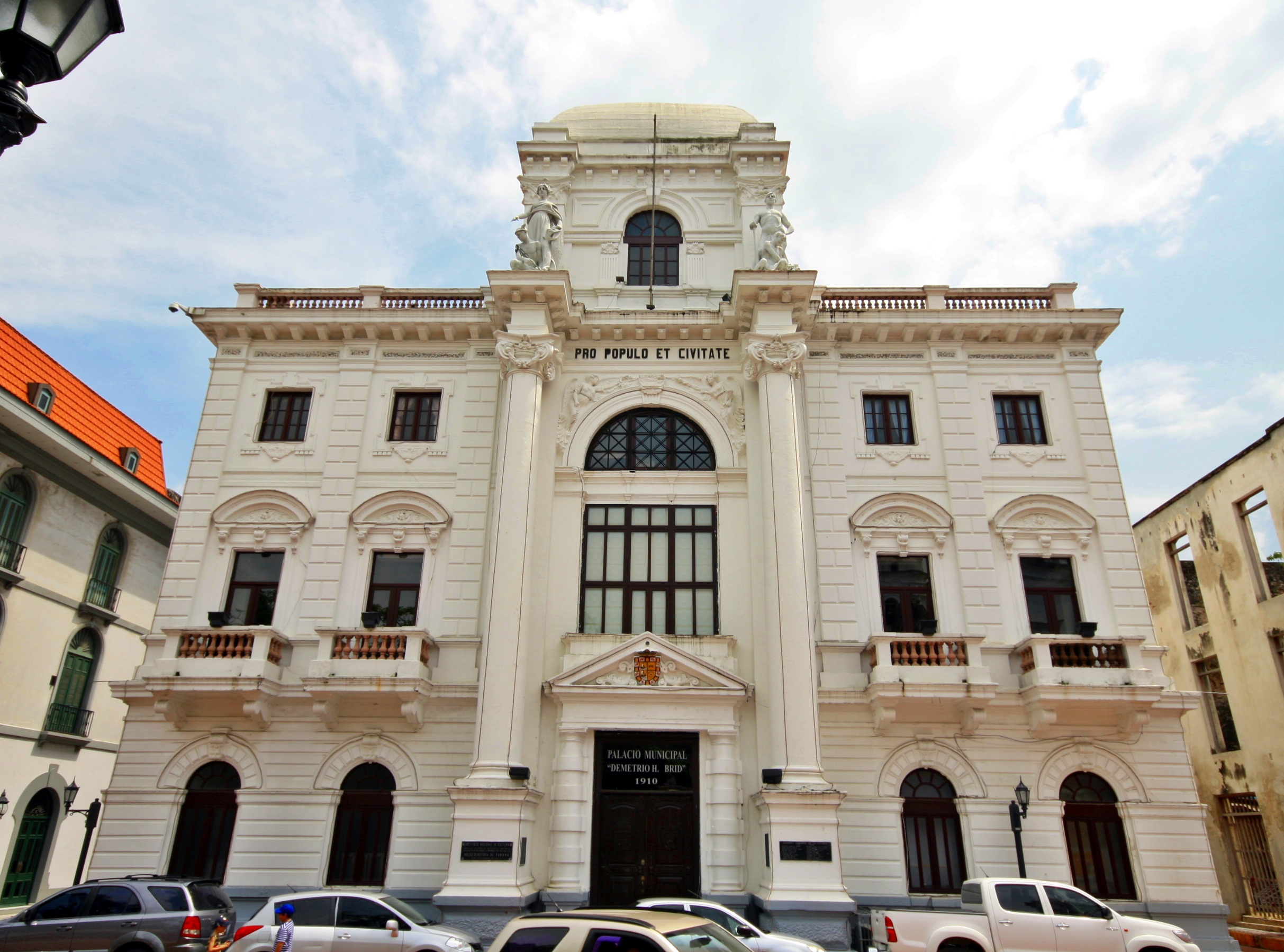
- Municipal Palace of Panama City, headquarters of the Museum of History of Panama.
- Established: 14 December 1977
- Location: Avenida Central, Panama City, Panama
- Coordinates: 8.9520441°N 79.5349140°W
- Type: History museum
- Founder: Reina Torres de Araúz
- Architect: Genaro Ruggieri

The Museum of History of Panama (Spanish: Museo de Historia de Panamá) is a history museum located on the ground floor of the Municipal Palace of Panama City, in the Casco Antiguo of Panama City. This was inaugurated on December 14, 1977 by the anthropologist Reina Torres de Araúz. Currently, it is administered by the Ministry of Culture of Panama. This museum is framed in the context of Panamanian history, encompassing the Colonial Period (1501 to 1821), the Union to Colombia (1821 to 1903) and the Republican Period (1903 to the present).

Among its collections there are maps, plans, religious objects, the Declaration of Independence of Panama from Spain, photographs and engravings of the construction of the Panama Canal Railway, and copies of the Political Constitution of 1972, among other documents of historical value. Her most outstanding work is a replica of the first Panamanian flag, made by María Ossa de Amador, wife of one of the heroes of the Separation of Panama from Colombia, the original design of the Coat of Arms; and the first score of the National anthem of Panama.

== History ==
Before the museum, a restoration of the property was carried out in 1975, in which a meeting room and library of the Panamanian Academy of History were enabled on the ground floor; a local office of the Directorate of Historical Heritage of the National Institute of Culture and a room known as "Room of the National Symbols". The museum was founded on December 14, 1977 by Dr. Reina Torres de Araúz, founder of other museums in Panama that were in the custody of the National Institute of Culture (INAC), current Ministry of Culture on the second floor of the Municipal Palace of Panama City.

=== Remodeling ===
The museum was moved to the ground floor of the building and was reopened on May 7, 1990. In 2000, the building was restored by the Friends of the Museums. The museum was handed over on September 1, 2000 to INAC. The rehabilitation process also included donations of museum material, among other contributions.

Later in 2012, the exhibition was remodeled and refurbished at a cost of B/.165,000.00. Among the adjustments were the correction of leaks in the walls, upper slab, change of air conditioners and a new museography.

== Exhibition rooms ==
Currently the Museum of History of Panama houses three permanent exhibits.

=== Colonial History Room ===
The room explains the arrival of the Spanish to the Isthmus of Panama, including the founding of Santa María la Antigua del Darién, of the Panama City and their transfer to current Casco Antiguo of Panama City. Upon the arrival of Europeans, there was a cultural mix in which objects and traditions from both Europe and America were adopted.

=== Departmental History Room ===
This shows the events that occurred during the Union of Panama to present-day Colombia until November 3, 1903, the day of Separation of Panama from Colombia. These include the construction of the Trans-isthmian Railroad and the attempted construction of the Panama Canal by the French, and the Thousand Days' War and the rejection of the Hay–Herrán Treaty.

=== Republican History Room ===
This room explains the events of the Separation of Panama from Colombia, and the National Symbol of Panama, including a replica of the first Panamanian flag that was made by María Ossa de Amador, wife of Manuel Amador Guerrero; hero of the Separation of Panama from Colombia and first President of Panama. In addition, it explains the events of January 9, 1964, the military period in Panama, the Torrijos–Carter Treaties and a gallery of the Presidents of the Republic of Panama.

== Collections ==
The Museum of History of Panama houses one of the most extensive collections in Panamanian history. In the Colonial History Room, the collections are made up of route maps, copies of old engravings, replicas and originals of European and indigenous weapons. The Departmental History Room is illustrated with copies of photographs and documents from the time of Unión a Colombia. One of the largest collections consists of the Republican History Room, with copies and originals of the National Symbols, documents and photographs covering the most recent period of Panama's history. These include a replica of the first Panamanian flag that was made by María Ossa de Amador, wife of Manuel Amador Guerrero; hero of the Separation of Panama from Colombia and first president of Panama. There is also the original design and the changes that the Coat of Arms has had, designed by Nicanor Villalaz and the original and current scores of the National Anthem of Panama, called in its beginnings as the Himno Istmeño.

== See also ==
- List of museums in Panama
