= Secession of Panama from Colombia =

1903 French- and US-supported establishment of the Republic of Panama

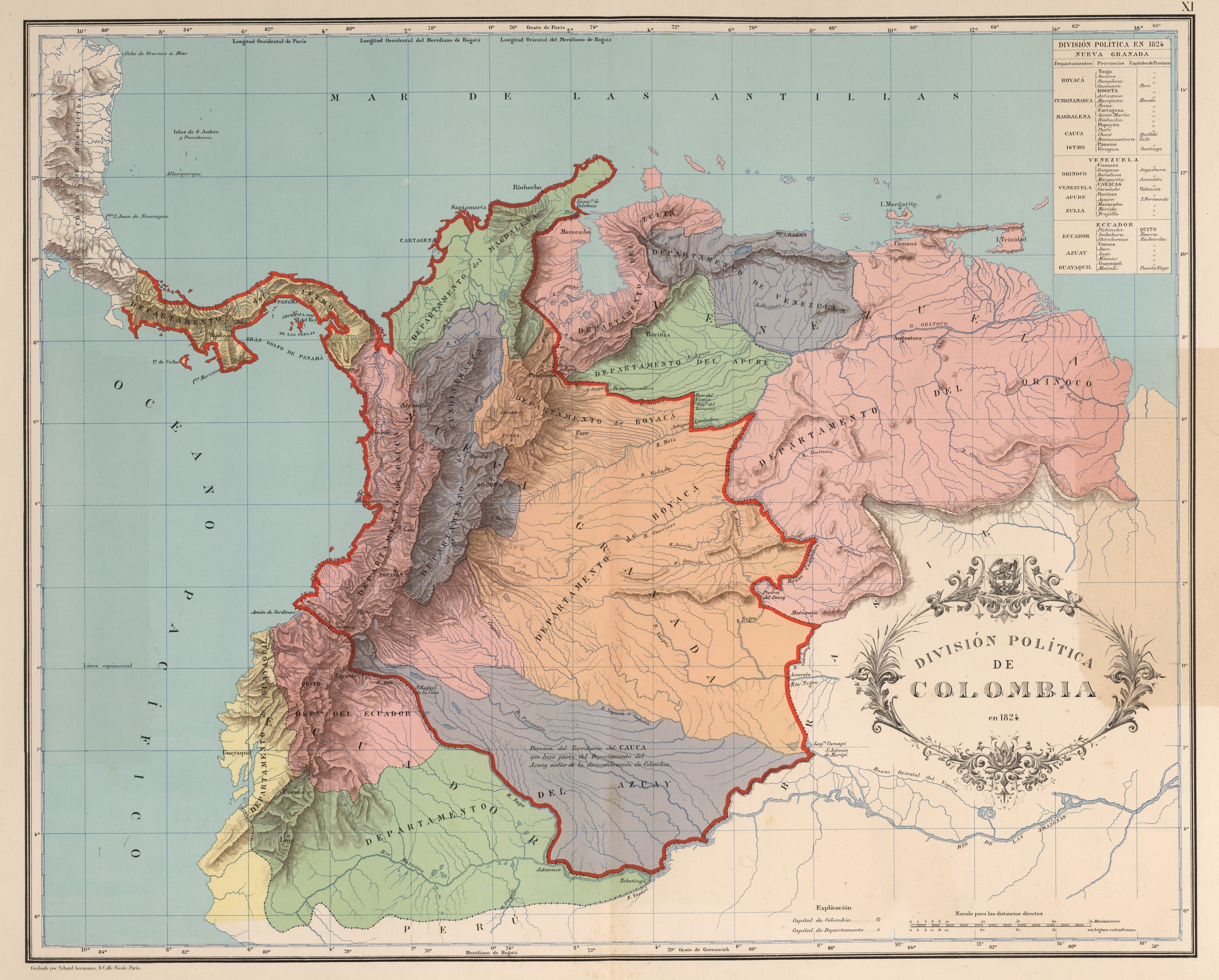
- Map showing the shrinking territory of Gran Colombia from 1824 (colored areas, including Venezuela and Ecuador) to 1890 (red line) and the Cundinamarca region. Panama seceded in 1903 from Colombia, and comprises the yellow area in the Central American isthmus.
Date	3 November 1903
Location	Isthmus of Panama, Colombia
Result	Panamanian political victory: Panama becomes independent from Colombia.; United States officially recognizes Panama as an independent country.

Belligerents
Panama; United States	Colombia

Commanders and leaders
(Panama) Manuel Amador Guerrero (Panama) Demetrio H. Brid (Panama) José Agustín Arango (United States) Theodore Roosevelt	(Colombia) José Manuel Marroquín

Units involved
USS Nashville	Bogotá

Casualties and losses
- 1 civilian

The secession of Panama from Colombia was formalized on 3 November 1903, with the establishment of the Republic of Panama and the abolition of the Colombia–Costa Rica border. From the independence of Panama from Spain in 1821, Panama had simultaneously joined itself to the confederation of Gran Colombia through the Independence Act of Panama. Panama was always tenuously connected to the rest of the country to the south, owing to its remoteness from the government in Bogotá and lack of a practical overland connection to the rest of Gran Colombia. In 1840–41, a short-lived independent republic was established under Tomás de Herrera. After rejoining Colombia following a 13-month independence, it remained a province which saw frequent rebellious flare-ups, notably the Panama crisis of 1885, which saw the intervention of the United States Navy, and a reaction by the Chilean Navy.

During the construction of the Panama Canal, the initial attempts by France to construct a sea-level canal across the isthmus were secured through treaty with Colombia; however French cost overruns led to abandonment of the canal for a decade. During the intervening years, local separatists used the political instability of the Thousand Days' War to agitate for political secession from Colombia and establishment of an independent republic. When the United States sought to take over the canal project, the legislature of Colombia rejected the proposed treaty. With the collaboration of French lobbyist Philippe-Jean Bunau-Varilla and United States President Theodore Roosevelt, Panama declared independence from Colombia and negotiated a treaty granting the U.S. the right to construct the canal.

The United States was the first country to recognize the independence of the nascent republic, sending the U.S. Navy to prevent Colombia from retaking the territory during the early days of the new Republic. In exchange for its role in defending the Republic, and for constructing the canal, the U.S. was granted a perpetual lease on the land around the canal, known as the Panama Canal Zone, which was returned to Panama in 1979 under the terms of the Torrijos–Carter Treaties.

After the United States, many other nations quickly recognized the independent republic, though Colombia initially refused to do so. Colombia finally recognized Panamanian independence in 1909, after receiving a US$500,000 ($17.9 million in 2025) payment from Panama to cover the debts it owed at independence.

== Background ==
=== Prelude ===
After achieving independence from Spain on November 28, 1821, Panama became a part of the Republic of Gran Colombia which consisted of today's Colombia, Venezuela, Panama, and most of Ecuador.

The political struggle between federalists and centralists that followed independence from Spain resulted in a shifting administrative and jurisdictional status for Panama. Under centralism Panama was established as the Department of the Isthmus and during federalism as the State of Panama. In 1886, it became the Panama Department of Colombia.

=== 1885 crisis ===
An 1846 treaty between Colombia and the United States, the Mallarino–Bidlack Treaty, pledged the United States to maintain "neutrality" in Panama in exchange for transit rights in the isthmus on behalf of Colombia. In March 1885 Colombia thinned its military presence in Panama, sending troops stationed there to fight rebels in other provinces. These favourable conditions prompted an insurgency in Panama. The United States Navy was sent there to keep order; however, consistent with its obligations under the treaty of 1846, the ship's commander refused to intervene in the rebellion.

=== Thousand Days' War ===
The Thousand Days' War (1899–1902) was one of the many armed struggles between the Liberal and Conservative Parties which devastated Colombia, including Panama, during the 19th century. This new civil war ended with the signing of the Treaties of Neerlandia (October 24, 1902) and USS Wisconsin (November 21, 1902). However, the Liberal leader Victoriano Lorenzo refused to accept the terms of the agreement and was executed on May 15, 1903.

On July 25, 1903, the headquarters of the Panamanian newspaper El Lápiz were raided on the orders of the military commander for Panama, General José Vásquez Cobo, brother of the then Colombian Minister of War, as a retaliation for the publication of a detailed article narrating the execution and protests in Panama. This event damaged the trust of Panamanian liberals in the Conservative government based in Bogotá, and they later joined the separatist movement.

In 1903, the United States and Colombia signed the Hay–Herrán Treaty to finalize the construction of the Panama Canal but the process could not be completed because the Congress of Colombia rejected the measure (which the Colombian government had proposed) on August 12, 1903.

== Secession ==
=== Formation of secessionist movement ===
Panamanian politician José Domingo De Obaldía was selected for the Governor of the Isthmus of Panama, an office that he had previously held, and was supported by secessionist movements. Another Panamanian politician named José Agustín Arango began to plan the revolution and secession. The secessionists wanted to negotiate the construction of the Panama Canal directly with the United States due to the negativity of the Colombian government.

The secessionist network was formed by Arango, Dr. Manuel Amador Guerrero, General Nicanor de Obarrio, Ricardo Arias, Federico Boyd, Carlos Constantino Arosemena, Tomás Arias, Manuel Espinosa Batista and others. The group was soon joined by Manuel Amador Guerrero, who would become the leader of the independence movement. Amador gained the support of important Panamanian liberal leaders and of another military commander, Esteban Huertas.

In September 1903, Amador traveled to New York in September to determine how the United States might support the separation movement. Amador was put in touch with the engineer Philippe Bunau-Varilla, meeting him in a suite in the Waldorf-Astoria hotel in New York. Bunau-Varilla wrote the conspirators a US$100,000 ($3.58 million in 2025) check to fund a renewed Panamanian revolt. In return, Bunau-Varilla would become Panama's representative in Washington. Bunai-Varilla then arranged for Amador to meet U.S. President Theodore Roosevelt. Roosevelt carefully avoided endorsing the revolt, but told Amador that if the Panamanian separatists revolted, the US would view this as a positive development and could be counted on to act accordingly. However, he warned Amador to avoid violence, since the American people would not recognize independence gained through bloodshed. Satisfied that his group had the tacit support of the U.S. government, Amador returned to Panama to set a plan in motion. Meanwhile, President Roosevelt ordered the warship USS Nashville under commander John Hubbard to proceed first to Jamaica, then to Panama.

=== Declaration of independence from Colombia ===
The secessionist movement set November 1903 as its date. However, rumors in Colombia spread but the information received by the government of Colombia indicated that Nicaragua was planning to invade a region of northern Panama known as the Calovébora. The Government deployed troops from the Tiradores Battalion from Barranquilla, and instructed the commander to take over the functions of the Governor of Panama José Domingo de Obaldía and General Esteban Huertas, whom the government did not trust. The Colombian troops dispatched to Panama were hastily assembled conscripts with little training. While these conscripts may have been able to defeat the Panamanian rebels, they would not have been able to defeat the US army troops that were supporting the Panamanian rebels. An army of conscripts was the best response the Colombians could muster, as Colombia was recovering from a civil war between Liberals and Conservatives from October 1899, to November 1902, known as the "Thousand Days War". The US was fully aware of these conditions and even incorporated them into the planning of the Panama intervention as the US acted as an arbitrator between the two sides. The peace treaty that ended the "Thousand Days War" was signed on the USS Wisconsin on 21 November 1902. While in port, the US also brought engineering teams to Panama with the peace delegation to begin planning the canal's construction before the US had even gained the rights to build the canal. All these factors would result in the Colombians being unable to put down the Panamanian rebellion and expel the United States troops occupying what today is the independent nation of Panama.

The Colombian Government dispatched 500 members of the Tiradores Battalion to Colón on the Caribbean Sea coast, traveling aboard the cruiser Cartagena and merchant ship Alexander Bixio. These troops were under command of Generals Juan Tovar and Ramón Amaya, and were hastily assembled conscripts with little training.

The USS Nashville landed on 2 November 1903 at Colón, using as pretext the Mallarino–Bidlack Treaty of 1846, which required the U.S. to preserve the peaceful use of the Panama Railroad. However, word also reached Colón of the Colombian ships on their way. As the news spread of the imminent arrival of Colombian troops, many of the conspirators abandoned the cause. Fearing that if they were caught they would be executed, Amador, Arango, and other conspirators met to discuss the situation. Amador returned home dejected, fearing all was lost, but his wife María de la Ossa came up with a plan to separate the Colombian generals from their troops with help from friends on the railway. She surmised that once the officers were separated and arrested, the troops could be bribed to return home. Amador went out to convince Herbert G. Prescott, assistant superintendent, and James Shaler, superintendent of the Panama Railway to help transport the generals and once he gained their approval, he called the separatists together to get them to endorse the plan. Shaler convinced the generals to go ahead to Panama City without their troops, while the railway was gathering sufficient cars for the troops.

The Tiradores Battalion arrived in the Panamanian city of Colón the morning of November 3, 1903. There, Generals Tovar and Amaya encountered Panama Railway authorities aligned with the secessionist movement, who ushered Tovar and his senior staff onto a train bound for Panama City to see Obaldía, but delayed the passage of the tiradores, leaving them leaderless. General Huertas, commander of the Colombia Battalion in Panama, eventually ordered the arrest of Tovar and his aides. Upon hearing of the arrests in Panama City, the tiradores in Colón, commanded by Col. Eliseo Torres, surrounded American troops garrisoned in the railroad yard before they were persuaded to leave Colón, under threat from USS Nashville. This is often cited as a classic example of the era of gunboat diplomacy.

When the plan successfully concluded, Panama's independence was proclaimed and the Municipal Council met and confirmed the establishment of the Republic of Panama. The Colombian gunboat Bogotá fired shells upon Panama City the night of November 3, causing injuries and mortally wounding Wong Kong Yee of Hong Sang, China. He was the only casualty of independence.

Demetrio H. Brid, president of the Municipal Council of Panama, became the de facto President of Panama and on November 4, 1903, appointed a Provisional Government Junta, which governed the country until February 1904 and the Constituent National Convention. The convention elected Manuel Amador Guerrero as first constitutional president. The United States quickly recognized the new nation. News of the secession of Panama from Colombia reached Bogotá only on November 6, 1903, due to a problem with the submarine cables.

=== Reactions ===
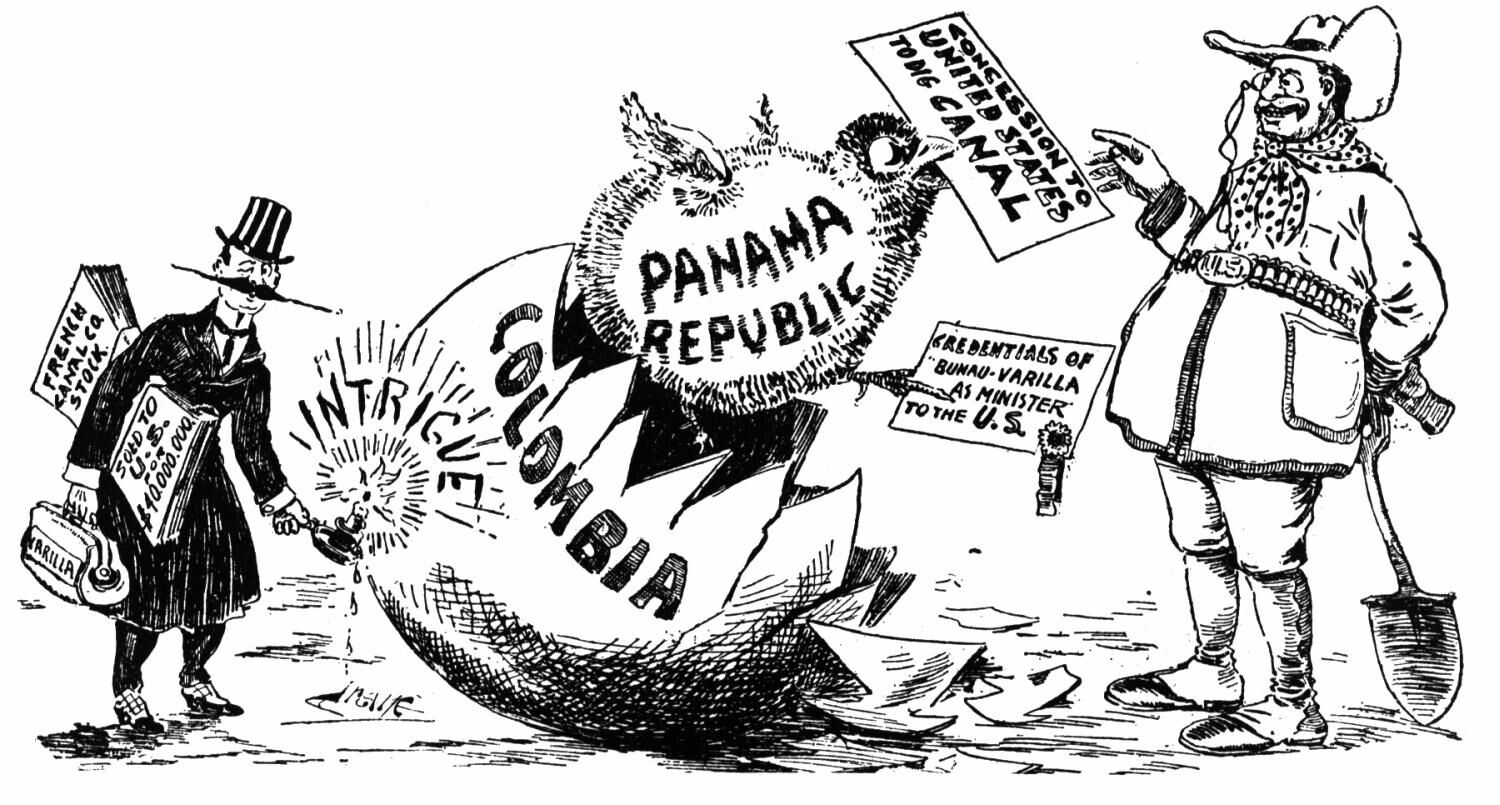
1903 political cartoon

On November 13, 1903, the United States formally recognized the Republic of Panama (after recognizing it unofficially on November 6 and 7). On November 18, 1903, the United States Secretary of State John Hay and Philippe-Jean Bunau-Varilla signed the Hay–Bunau-Varilla Treaty to establish the Panama Canal Zone. No Panamanians signed the treaty, although Bunau-Varilla was present as the diplomatic representative of Panama (a role he had purchased through financial assistance to the rebels), even though he had not lived in Panama for seventeen years prior to independence, and never returned afterwards. The treaty was later approved by the Panamanian government and the Senate of the United States.

The ambassador of Colombia in Ecuador Emiliano Isaza was informed of the situation in Panama but did not inform his government to prevent a revolt in Bogotá. The government of Colombia then sent a diplomatic mission to Panama in an effort to make them reconsider by suggesting an approval by the senate of Colombia if they reconsidered the Hay–Herrán Treaty instead of the Hay–Bunau-Varilla Treaty and also proposed making Panama City the capital of Colombia.

The mission met aboard the ship USS Mayflower with the Panamanian delegation formed by Constantino Arosemena, Tomás Arias and Eusebio A. Morales, which rejected all proposals. Colombia then sent a delegation of prominent politicians and political figures; General Rafael Reyes, Pedro Nel Ospina, Jorge Holguín and Lucas Caballero who met with the same representative for Panama and Carlos Antonio Mendoza, Nicanor de Obarrio y Antonio Zubieta, without reaching any consensus.

Panama's independence caused Chilean authorities alarm concerning the growing influence of the United States. This made Chile put great efforts to deny a United States purchase of the Galápagos Islands or the establishment of a United States Guantanamo-like naval base there. Chilean diplomacy was backed by Germany and Britain on this issue.

There was concern in both Argentina and Brazil about the precedent set by Panamanian secession, as they worried that they would have their own breakaway territories. Colombia's neighbors were among the first to recognize Panama, seeing it as a way to weaken Colombia.

President Roosevelt famously stated, "I took the Isthmus, started the canal and then left Congress not to debate the canal, but to debate me." Several parties in the United States called this an act of war on Colombia: The New York Times described the support given by the United States to Bunau-Varilla as an "act of sordid conquest". The New York Evening Post called it a "vulgar and mercenary venture". The US maneuvers are often cited as the classic example of US gunboat diplomacy in Latin America, and the best illustration of what Roosevelt meant by the old African adage, "Speak softly and carry a big stick [and] you will go far."

In 1921, Colombia and the United States entered into the Thomson–Urrutia Treaty, in which the United States agreed to pay Colombia US$25 million ($451 million in 2025): $5 million upon ratification, and four $5 million annual payments, and grant Colombia special privileges in the Canal Zone. In return, Colombia recognized Panama as an independent nation.

=== Recognition of Panama as a country ===
No.	Country	Date of recognition
1	United States	6 November 1903
2	France	14 November 1903
3	Qing Empire	26 November 1903
4	Austria–Hungary	27 November 1903
5	Germany	30 November 1903
6	Denmark	3 December 1903
7	Russia	6 December 1903
8	Norway	7 December 1903
9	Sweden	7 December 1903
10	Belgium	8 December 1903
11	Nicaragua	15 December 1903
12	Peru	19 December 1903
13	Cuba	23 December 1903
14	Italy	24 December 1903
16	United Kingdom	26 December 1903
17	Japan	28 December 1903
18	Switzerland	28 December 1903
19	Costa Rica	28 December 1903
20	Guatemala	15 January 1904
21	Korea	24 January 1904
22	Venezuela	3 February 1904
23	Netherlands	6 February 1904
24	Persia	February 1904
25	Chile	1 March 1904
26	Mexico	1 March 1904
27	Brazil	2 March 1904
28	Argentina	3 March 1904
29	Siam	4 March 1904
30	Honduras	March 1904
31	El Salvador	March 1904
32	Spain	10 May 1904
33	Holy See	May 1904
34	Portugal	21 May 1904
35	Serbia	June 1904
36	Paraguay	July 1904
37	Romania	July 1904
38	Greece	1904
39	Uruguay	1904
40	Ecuador	21 September 1904
41	Colombia	7 January 1909

== See also ==
- Colombia–Panama relations
- History of the Panama Canal
- Postage stamps and postal history of the Canal Zone
- United States involvement in regime change
- Latin America–United States relations
- List of United States invasions of Latin American countries
