= Tomás Arias =

Panamanian politician and businessman (1856–1932)

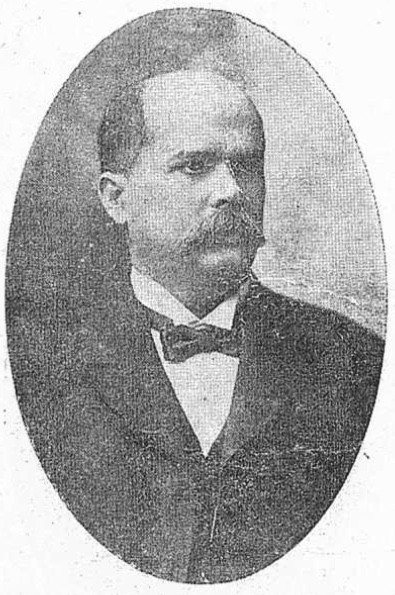
- Tomás Arias Avila

Member of the Provisional Government Junta of Panama
- In office 4 November 1903 – 20 February 1904 Serving with: José Agustín Arango; Federico Boyd
- Preceded by: Demetrio H. Brid (President of the Municipal Council)
- Succeeded by: Manuel Amador Guerrero (President of Panama)

1st Minister of Foreign Affairs of Panama
- In office 1903–1904
- President: Provisional Government Junta
- Preceded by: Office established
- Succeeded by: Santiago de la Guardia

Secretary of Government and Foreign Affairs of the Department of Panama
- In office 1893–1898
- Governor: José Domingo de Obaldía

Personal details
- Born: December 29, 1856 Panama City, Republic of New Granada
- Died: July 20, 1932 (aged 75) Panama City, Panama
- Party: Conservative
- Spouse: Carmen Espinosa
- Parents: Ramón Arias Feraud; Manuela Avila
- Occupation: Politician, businessman

Tomás Arias Ávila (December 29, 1856 in Panama City, Republic of New Granada – July 20, 1932 in Panama City, Panama) was a Panamanian politician and businessman who was, together with José Agustín Arango and Federico Boyd, a first president of Panama as a member of the provisional junta that governed Panama after its independence in 1903.

Tomás Arias was the son of Ramon Arias and Manuela Avila. A businessman, Arias attended schools in Panama, Jamaica, and the United States. Arias was one of the leaders during the emancipation movement in 1903. His brother, Ricardo Arias, was also part of the movement. Tomás Arias's eloquence and talent as a public speaker won him the designation of diplomat representing the Isthmus of Panama.

During his political career he held several posts: Treasury administrator, Departmental Assembly deputy (1882), representative to the Colombian Congress, senator (1888–1892), government secretary (1893–1900), foreign relations minister, chairman of the National Assembly (1906), minister of Panama in Mexico, consul, and first President of the Republic of Panama (1903–1904).

Arias, along with José Agustín Arango, defended the Hay–Bunau-Varilla Treaty because he was convinced that it was the only guarantee of the possible construction of the Panama Canal.

He died in Panama City, Panama on July 20, 1932, at the age of 75.
