= Manuel Espinosa Batista =

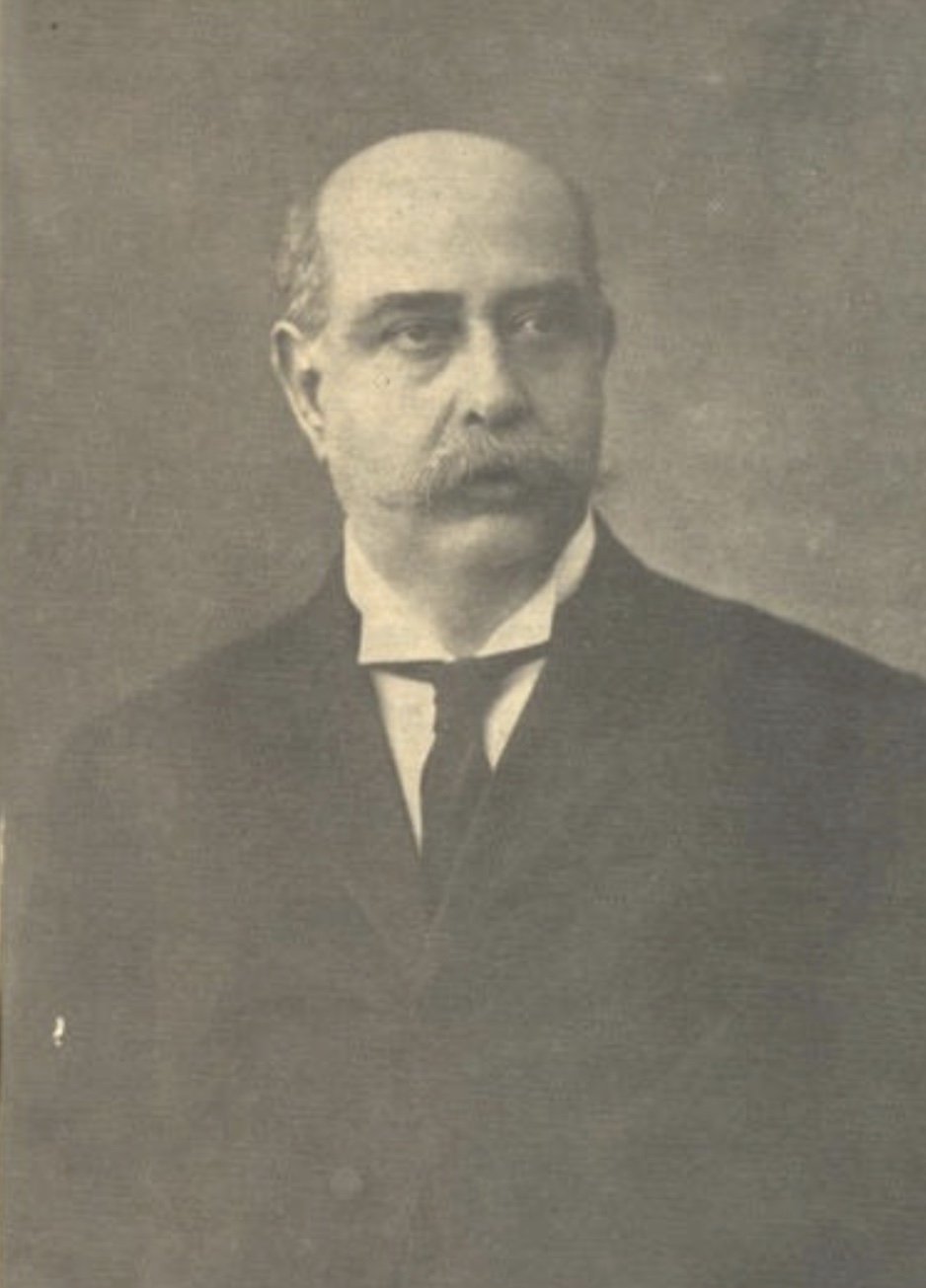
Manuel Espinosa Batista.

Manuel Espinosa Batista (September 12, 1857 – November 27, 1919) was a Colombian pharmacist turned politician who campaigned for a separate Panama state and became one of "Founders of the Republic". He is known for his philanthropy.

== Early life ==
Born in Cartagena, Republic of New Granada, his father was Manuel Espinosa and his mother was Purificación Batista. At the early age of 13, he traveled to the Isthmus of Panama after being encouraged to do so by his relatives in Panama. He started to work for a pharmacy, raising money to pay for his books and pharmaceutical studies. Eventually, he became an expert pharmacist and established a pharmacy on Central Avenue in 1882, in front of the Arias-Feraud house (now known as Casa de la Municipalidad). A few months later, his great friend Jose Gabriel Duque was given a government contract to create a National Lottery and Manuel became his guarantor. Later, in 1899, Manuel became president of the company. Manual invested in, and created other business ventures.

== Political career ==
Manuel Espinosa Batista started his political life by winning a place in the city council from 1897 to 1898. He was a supporter of the separatist movement, which wanted the separation of Panama from Colombia. This group of separatists was formed by José Agustín Arango, Manuel Amador Guerrero, Nicanor de Obarrio, Ricardo Arias, Federico Boyd, Carlos Constantino Arosemena, Tomás Arias, and Manuel Espinosa Batista. Nowadays they are called the "Founders of the Republic". José Agustín Arango organized meetings in the back part of the pharmacy owned by Manuel Espinosa Batista.

Panama achieved separation from Colombia on November 3, 1903. That night the local council proclaimed the separation and convened open cabildo in Panama City the next day. During that cabildo, Panama independence was made official in an act signed by the members of the council and the citizens who attended the event. The President of the council Demetrio H. Brid appointed the Provisional Government Junta formed by: José Agustín Arango, Tomás Arias and Federico Boyd - Manuel Espinosa Batista was appointed Deputy Member of the Provisional Government Junta, and his appointment was announce to each member by a note from Demetrio H. Brid. From November 9, 1903 to December 7, 1903 Manuel Espinosa Batista temporary replaced Federico Boyd within the Junta.

== Other interests ==
Manuel Espinosa Batista not only acquired great economic, social, and political position during his life, but he was also a philanthropist. He granted scholarships to various boys with little resources, if they had willingness to study, and sent them overseas. In 1885 there was a great fire in Colón and many houses were destroyed, so he donated money to build new houses for the people who had lost everything. He also donated money to build streets in Panama city, donated money for the city's electric lighting, and for the recollection of garbage.

As a member of the city council, if there was not enough money to complete a scheme for the city, he would finance projects from his own pocket.

He also supported the orphanage administrated by the Salesians of Don Bosco. That orphanage later become the Don Bosco Technical Institute (Instituto Técnico Don Bosco), a private catholic school, which has a small building named Manuel Espinosa Batista.

== Family life ==
He was married to Elisa Remón Escobar and they had seven children: María, Elisa, Isabel, Cecilia, Carmen, Raúl and Manuel Espinosa Remón. His wife, together with Hortensia de Alfaro, backed the closing show of the first art season in the Republic of Panama in 1910. This last show of the season was in benefit of the old people's home Bolívar and the children's orphanage.

== Legacy ==
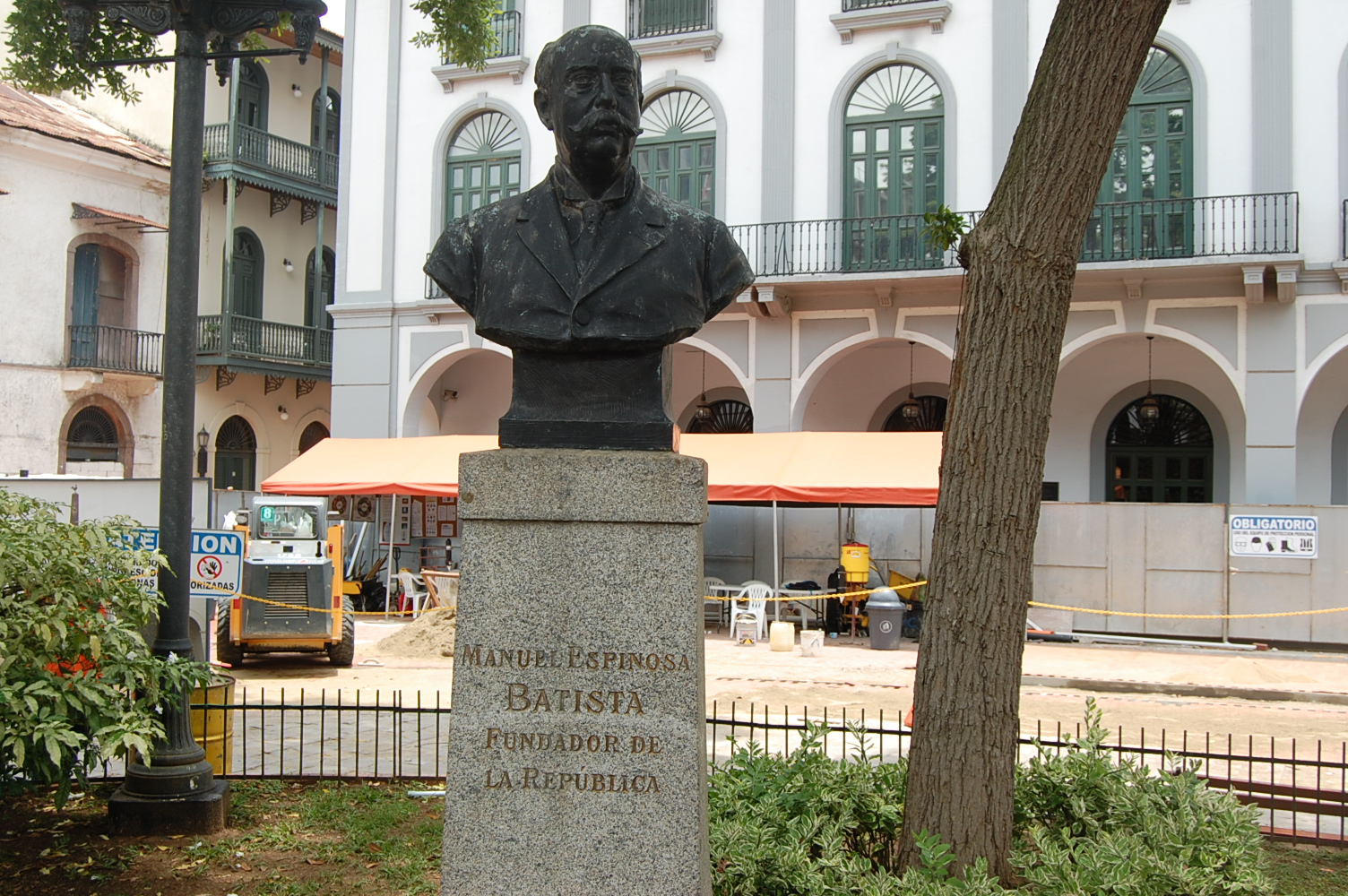
Bust of Manuel Espinosa Batista in Plaza de la Independencia, Panama City.

Manuel Espinosa Batista died at the age of 62, on November 27, 1919. the day before the 63rd birthday of the President Belisario Porras.

On December 16, 1924, the National Assembly of Panama, passed a law to commission a bronze bust sculpture of Manuel Espinosa Batista with the legend "Founder of the Republic", together with other busts of José Agustín Arango, Tomás Arias and Federico Boyd, members of the Provisional Government Junta and the bust of Manuel Amador Guerrero, the first President of the Republic of Panama.

These busts are located in Independence Square, or Plaza Catedral, in Panama City. Later the busts of other members of the separatist movement were added to the square.

A public school and an avenue in Panama are named after Manuel Espinosa Batista.
