= 1908 Panamanian presidential election =

Presidential elections were held in Panama on July 12, 1908. José Domingo de Obaldía won the election. The election was preceded by municipal elections on June 28, which were won by Obaldía's supporters.

Obaldía's main opponent in the race, Ricardo Arias Feraud, withdrew from the race, leaving Obaldia unopposed. Supporters of Arias abstained from voting.

The incumbent president, Manuel Amador Guerrero, supported Arias Feraud in the election. There were fears among American policymakers that Amador Guerrero would rig the election in favor of Arias Feraud, which prompted the U.S. to threaten to intervene if the elections were rigged. Secretary of War William Taft travelled to Panama in May 1908 where he instructed Amador to run a free and fair election.

There were expectations that the election would be marred by disorder, but it proceeded in an orderly fashion.

== Results ==
Candidate	Votes	%
José Domingo de Obaldía	258	100.00
Total	258	100.00
Registered voters/turnout	269	–
Source: State Department
