= Spooner Act =

1902 act of the United States Congress

- Other short titles: Panama Canal Act of 1902
- Long title: An Act To provide for the construction of a canal connecting the waters of the Atlantic and Pacific oceans.
- Enacted by: the 57th United States Congress
- Effective: June 28, 1902

Citations
- Statutes at Large: 32 Stat. 481

Legislative history
- Introduced in the House as H.R. 3110 by William Peters Hepburn (introduced original bill); John Coit Spooner (introduced the amendment); Passed the Senate on June 19, 1902 (67–6); Passed the House on June 25, 1902 (260–8); Signed into law by President Theodore Roosevelt on June 28, 1902

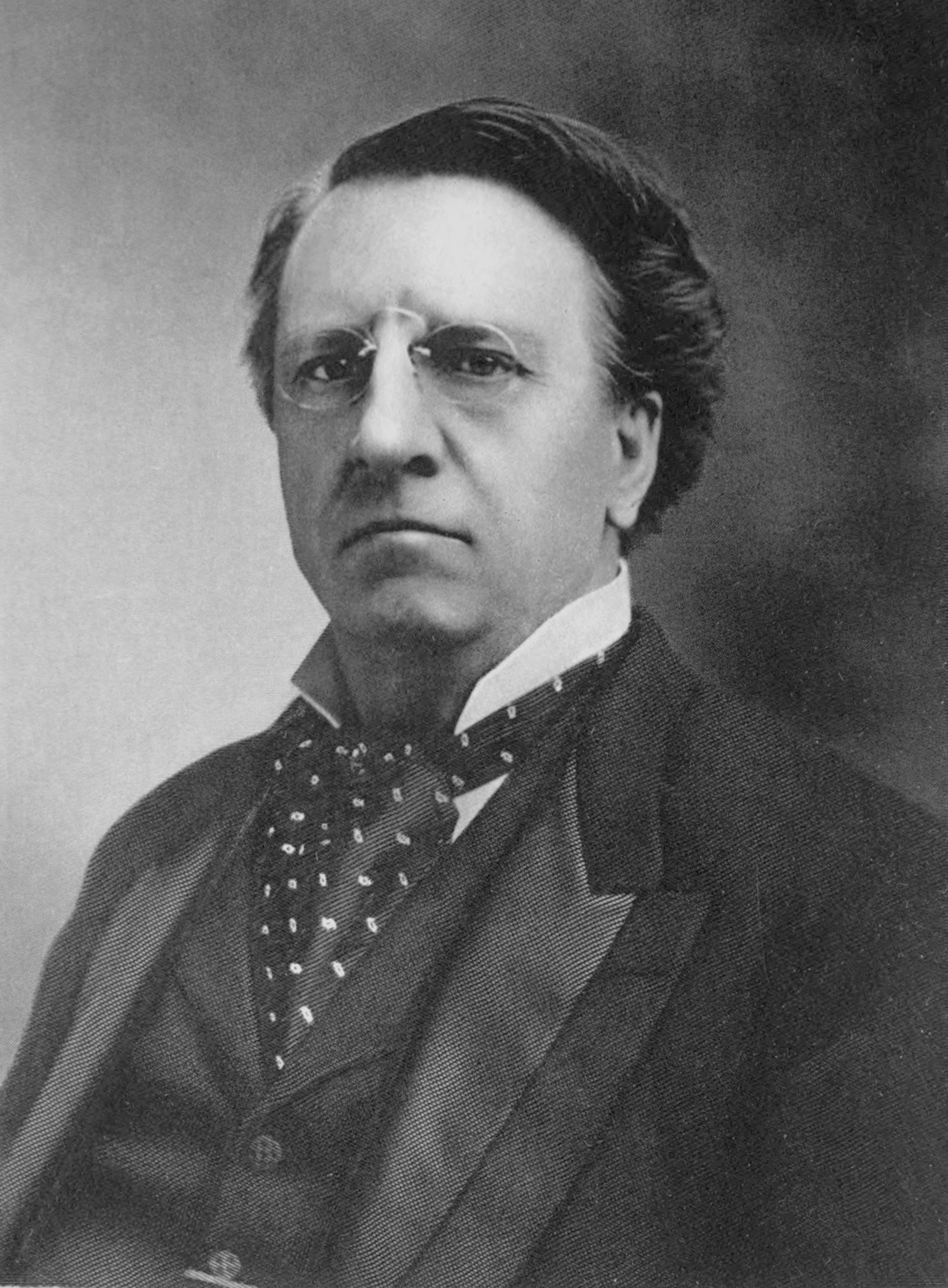
John Coit Spooner, United States Senator from Wisconsin

The First Spooner Act of 1902 (also referred to as the Panama Canal Act, 32 Stat. 481) was written by a United States senator from Wisconsin, John Coit Spooner, enacted on June 28, 1902, and signed by President Roosevelt the following day. It authorized purchasing the assets of a French syndicate called the Compagnie Nouvelle du Canal de Panama, provided that a treaty could be negotiated with the Republic of Colombia.

The syndicate, headed by Philippe-Jean Bunau-Varilla, sold at a price reduced from $110 million to only $40 million. US lawyer William Nelson Cromwell subsequently received a commission of $800,000 for his lobbying.

The Spooner Act was followed by the Hay–Bunau-Varilla Treaty of November 18, 1903.

== See also ==
- History of the Panama Canal
- Panama Canal Railway
- Ferdinand de Lesseps
