= Esteban Huertas =

Colombian and later Panamanian military commander

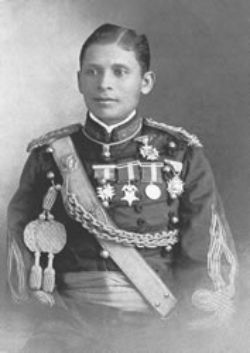
Huertas, c. 1900.

Esteban Huertas López (1876–1943) was a Colombian and later Panamanian military commander. He was a member of Panama's Conservative Party.

== Biography ==
He was born in Úmbita in Boyacá, Colombia on 28 May 1876. His parents were Fulgencio Huertas and Sagrario López. They wanted him to become a priest, but Huertas did not, so he ran away from home when he was 8 years old. He joined the Colombian army in 1885, at age 9. He arrived in Panama in 1890, at the age of 14.

Fighting in the civil war, he won many medals. In 1900 he lost his left arm when he fired a cannon. It was replaced by a wooden prosthesis. In 1902 he was promoted to the rank of general. Manuel Amador Guerrero managed to get Huertas on his side by spreading rumours that he would lose his title and be sent to the dangerous inlands of Colombia. In 1903 he took part in the revolution that led Panama to independence.

In 1903, after independence, Huertas became the commander of the Panamanian army, which at the time consisted of 250 men. On October 28, 1904, with support from the Liberal Party, Huertas demanded two ministers from Amador's conservative cabinet resign. Fearing a coup, and with the support of U.S. ambassador John Barrett, Amador disbanded the army and Huertas had to resign. This damaged Huertas's public image, and he retired, never returning to public life.

Huertas was married and had a son. He died in Hospital Santo Tomás in Panama City after a brief illness on 31 July 1943. He was given a state funeral the following day, and a state of national mourning was proclaimed.

== Legacy ==
His role in the country's independence made a Huertas a national hero. The Panamanian poet Rodolfo Caicedo paid tribute to Huertas in his 1904 poem "Paz y Progreso" ("Peace and Progress"). His image was damaged by his conflict with Amator and his resignation. In the time since his death, his reputation has improved in Panama due to his role in the nation's independence. In 1953, to commemorate the country's fiftieth anniversary, Huertas was one of several figures to be featured on Panamanian postage stamps.

Huertas is portrayed as "General Esteban" in The Sharpie of the Culebra Cut, a Scrooge McDuck comic by Keno Don Rosa that is set in Panama in 1906. In the comic, General Esteban is a villain who wants to seize power in Panama to enrich himself using the Panama Canal (which he plans to rename Esteban Canal, and it would make him one of the most powerful and richest dictators in the world). As Rosa could find no real life Colombian or Panamanian villains, he based the villain off Huertas but only named him "General Esteban" to try to make a different, fictional character. After great treasure discovered by Scrooge McDuck and Teddy Roosevelt, Esteban's visions of power grow even greater as he can hire mercenaries, build armaments and even his own navy with the ancient gold. However, he is knocked down by a Parita chief and extradited to Colombia. The Parita chief claims "we know well of the evil war chief Esteban".
