= Philippe Bunau-Varilla =

French engineer and lobbyist

Philippe-Jean Bunau-Varilla
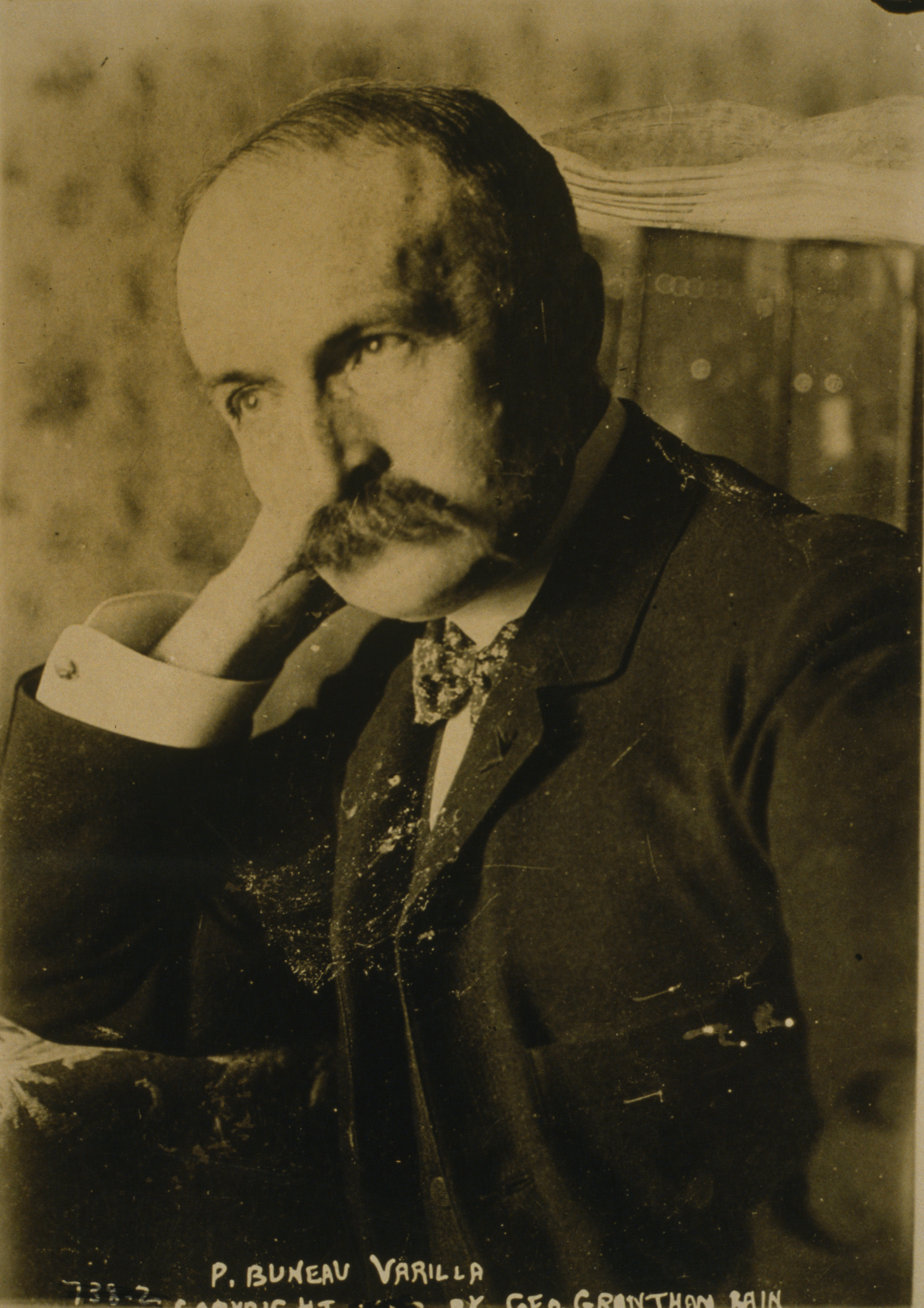
- Philippe-Jean Bunau-Varilla in 1924

Personal details
- Born: 26 July 1859 Paris, French Empire
- Died: 18 May 1940 (aged 80) Paris, France
- Known for: Panama Canal

Philippe-Jean Bunau-Varilla (French: [filip ʒɑ̃ byno vaʁija]; 26 July 1859 – 18 May 1940) was a French engineer, soldier and political lobbyist. With the assistance of American lobbyist and lawyer William Nelson Cromwell, Bunau-Varilla greatly influenced Washington's decision concerning the construction site for the Panama Canal. He worked closely with President Theodore Roosevelt in the latter's orchestration of the Panamanian Revolution, and represented Panama in the treaty negotiations leading to the Hay-Bunau-Varilla Treaty (1903).

== Early life ==
Bunau-Varilla was born on 26 July 1859 in Paris, France. After graduating at age 20 from the École Polytechnique, he remained in France for three years. In 1882 he abandoned his career in public works at the École Nationale des Ponts et Chaussées and traveled to Panama. He arrived at the isthmus in 1884, employed with Ferdinand de Lesseps's Panama Canal Company. He became general manager of the organization.

== Panama Canal ==
=== The choice of Panama as construction site ===
After the Panama Canal Company went bankrupt in 1889, Bunau-Varilla was left stranded in Panama. He struggled to find a new way to construct the canal. When the New Panama Canal Company sprang up back in his native France, Bunau-Varilla sailed home, having purchased a large amount of stock. However, the New Panama Canal Company soon abandoned efforts to build the canal, rather aiming to sell its rights in Panama to the United States, in order to recoup the stakeholdings of its shareholders. When Theodore Roosevelt became president in 1901, canal planning resumed in the United States. Bunau-Varilla energetically promoted a canal in Panama. With aid from the New Panama Canal Company's New York attorney, William Nelson Cromwell, he persuaded the government to select Panama as the canal site, as opposed to the popular alternative, Nicaragua. When opponents voiced their interest in constructing a canal through Nicaragua, which was a less politically volatile nation, Bunau-Varilla actively lobbied in the United States, for example by distributing Nicaraguan postage stamps featuring belching volcanos to senators. Through lobbying of businessmen, government officials, and the American public, Bunau-Varilla convinced the U.S. Congress to appropriate $40 million to the New Panama Canal Company, under the Spooner Act of 1902. The funds were contingent on negotiating a treaty with Colombia to provide land for the canal in its territory of Panama.

=== Secession of Panama from Colombia ===
Bunau-Varilla's rejected flag design for Panama

Colombia signed the Hay–Herrán Treaty in 1903, ceding land in Panama to the United States for the canal, but the Senate of Colombia rejected ratification. Bunau-Varilla's company was in danger of losing the $40 million of the Spooner Act, and so he drew up plans with Panamanian separatists in New York for secession from Colombia. By the eve of the planned revolution, Bunau-Varilla had already drafted the new nation's constitution, flag, and military establishment, and promised to float the entire government on his own checkbook. Bunau-Varilla's flag design was however rejected by the Panamanian revolutionary council on the grounds that it was designed by a foreigner. Although he prepared for a small-scale civil war, violence was limited. As promised, President Roosevelt interposed a U.S. naval fleet between the Colombian forces south of the isthmus and Panamanian separatists.

=== U.S. control of the canal area ===
Bunau-Varilla, as Panama's ambassador to the United States, was invested with plenipotentiary powers by President Manuel Amador. Lacking formal consent of the government of Panama, he entered into negotiations with the American Secretary of State, John Hay, to give control of the Panama Canal area to the U.S. No Panamanians signed the resulting Hay–Bunau-Varilla Treaty, though it was ratified in Panama on 2 December 1903. Bunau-Varilla had received his ambassadorship through financial assistance to the rebels, he had not lived in Panama for seventeen years, and he never returned, leading to the charge that he was "appointed Minister by cable". Panamanians long resented the trust given to him by the new Panamanian authorities. The treaty was finally undone by the Torrijos–Carter Treaties in 1977.

== Return to Paris ==
Bunau-Varilla remained active as an engineer, a financial writer, and a leading specialist in water chlorination. In World War I, he served as an officer in the French army and lost a leg at the Battle of Verdun. As an elder lobbyist, he promoted altering the canal from a lock system to a sea-level waterway. In 1938, France awarded him the Grand Cross of the Legion of Honor. He died in Paris on 18 May 1940.

== Personal income ==
Bunau-Varilla lived a lavish lifestyle. Guests to his elegant Paris residence often reflected on the immaculate grandeur of the home. He was known to entertain friends and strategic partners at some of the most pricey locations of his time. His money was not made as an engineer during his first stay working on the first Panama Canal project (under de Lesseps). He made his fortune during his second stay in Panama from 1886 to 1889, where he ran his own company, Artigue & Sonderegger, together with his brother Maurice, who later became the rich owner of Le Matin, a major Parisian newspaper.
