= Colombia–Panama relations =

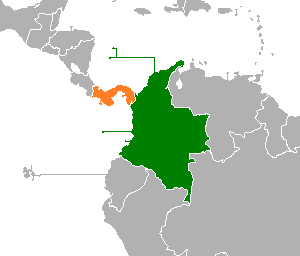
- Colombia: Panama

Colombia–Panama relations are the bilateral relations between the neighboring countries of Colombia and Panama. Both countries are members of the Latin American Integration Association, Organization of American States, and United Nations.

The relationship has developed since the separation of Panama from Colombia in 1903. Official diplomatic relations were established on 9 July 1924, when the Colombian government recognized Panama as an independent and sovereign state.

== History ==
The secession of Panama from Colombia was formalized on 3 November 1903, with the establishment of the Republic of Panama and the abolition of the Colombia-Costa Rica border. From the independence of Panama from Spain in 1821, Panama had simultaneously declared independence from Spain and joined itself to the confederation of Gran Colombia through the Independence Act of Panama. Panama was always tenuously connected to the rest of the country to the south, owing to its remoteness from the government in Bogotá and lack of a practical overland connection to the rest of Gran Colombia. In 1840–41, a short-lived independent republic was established under Tomás de Herrera. After rejoining Colombia following a 13-month independence, it remained a province which saw frequent rebellious flare-ups, notably the Panama crisis of 1885, which saw the intervention of the United States Navy, and a reaction by the Chilean Navy.

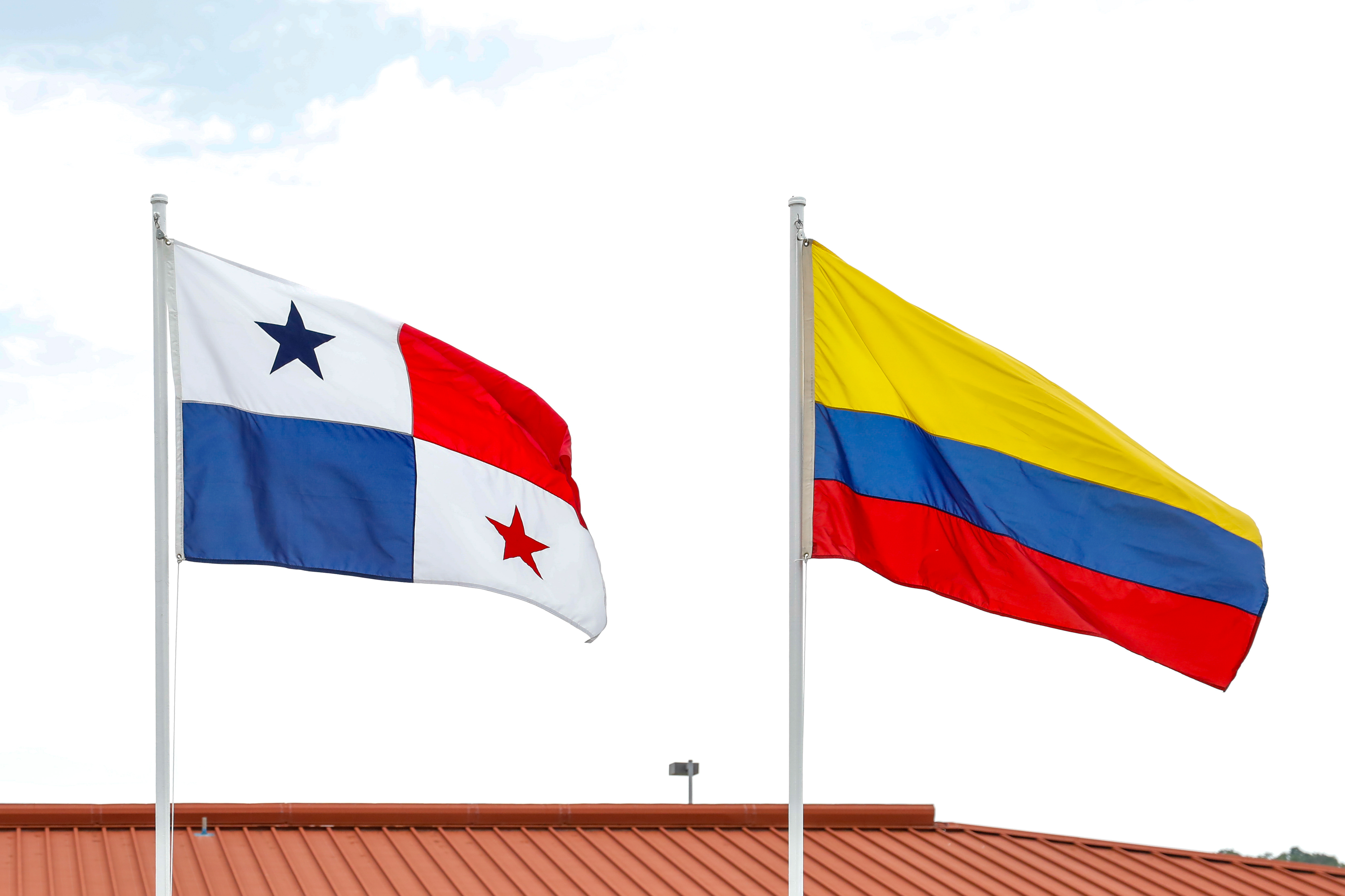
Flags of Panama (left) and Colombia (right)

== Diplomatic missions ==
- Colombia has an embassy in Panama City and consulates in Colón, Jaqué, Panama City and Puerto Obaldía.
- Panama has an embassy in Bogotá and a consulate-general in Barranquilla and Bogotá.

== See also ==
- Colombia–Panama border
- Foreign relations of Colombia
- Foreign relations of Panama
- Secession of Panama from Colombia
