= José Domingo de Obaldía =

President of Panama (1845–1910)

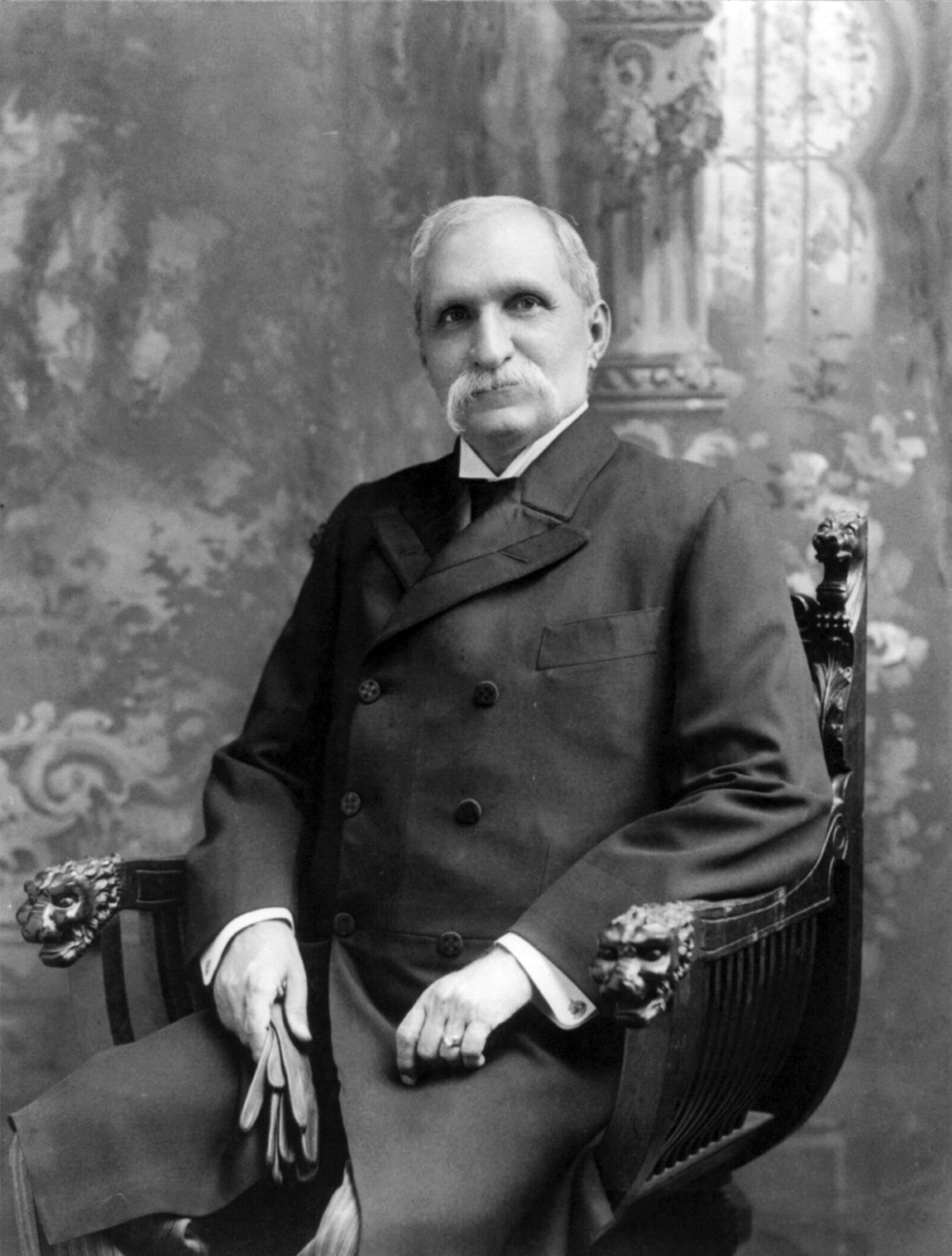

2nd President of Panama
- In office 1 October 1908 – 1 March 1910
- Deputy: Presidential designates José Agustín Arango; Carlos Antonio Mendoza; Juan M. Lambert
- Preceded by: Manuel Amador
- Succeeded by: Carlos Antonio Mendoza

Personal details
- Born: January 30, 1845; David, Republic of New Granada (now Panama)
- Died: March 1, 1910 (aged 65); Panama City, Panama
- Political party: National Liberal
- Spouse(s): Manuela Jované; Josefa Jované
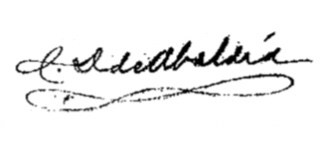
- Signature

José Domingo de Obaldía Gallegos (30 January 1845 – 1 March 1910) was President of Panama from October 1, 1908 to March 1, 1910.

Jose Domingo de Obaldía Gallegos was the second President of the Republic of Panama from 1908 to 1910 and the first president elected by popular vote after the separation of Panama from Colombia.

== Early life ==
Son of José de Obaldía and Ana Maria Gallegos, he was born in David, Chiriquí on January 30, 1845.

== Political career ==
Known as a strategist and gentleman of politics, he was the last governor of the Department of the Isthmus of Panama in 1903.

During the first government of the Republic, he was elected as the second presidential designate by the National Assembly for the term 1904-1906, and as the first presidential designate for the term 1906-1908.

=== 1908 Panamaian presidential election ===
Obaldia won the 1908 Panamanian presidential election held on July 12, 1908. The election was preceded by municipal elections on June 28, which were won by Obaldía's supporters.

Obaldía's main opponent in the race, Ricardo Arias Feraud, withdrew from the race, leaving Obaldia unopposed. Supporters of Arias abstained from voting.

The incumbent president, Manuel Amador Guerrero, supported Arias Feraud in the election. There were fears among American policymakers that Amador Guerrero would rig the election in favor of Arias Feraud, which prompted the U.S. to threaten to intervene if the elections were rigged. There were expectations that the election would be marred by disorder, but it proceeded in an orderly fashion.

=== President of Panama ===
When José Domingo de Obaldía assumed the presidency in 1908, he began a policy of protecting the dignity of the Panamanian nation while respecting its interests in international relations with the United States. Additionally, he reinforced the country's security with the implementation of Decree No. 18 of January 26, 1909, for the establishment of the National Secret Police. He also realized the creation of the correctional houses of Colón and Panama, and created the District of Santa Maria in the Chiriquí province. In the educational field, he executed the construction project of the National Institute of Panama, among others.

He died before finishing his term as President of the Republic of Panama on March 1, 1910.

Political offices
Preceded by Manuel Amador	President of Panama; 1908–1910	Succeeded by Carlos Antonio Mendoza
