= Manuel Amador Guerrero =

President of Panama (1833–1909)

Manuel Amador
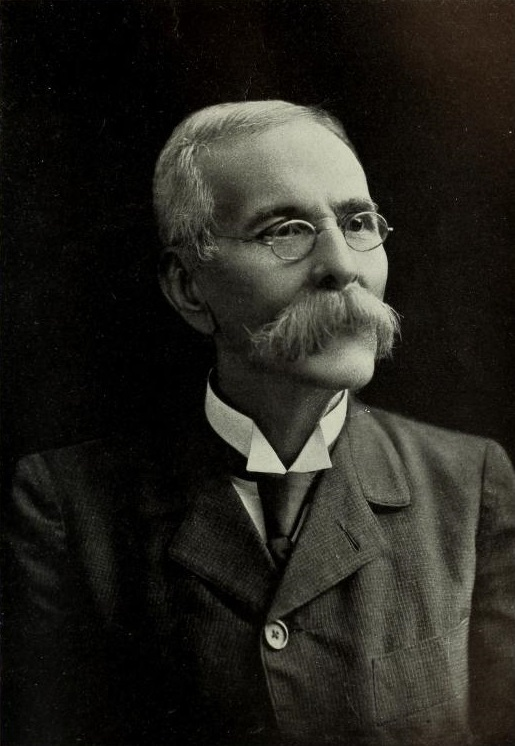

1st President of Panama
- In office 20 February 1904 – 1 October 1908
- Deputy: Presidential designates Pablo Arosemena; José Domingo de Obaldia; Carlos Antonio Mendoza; José Domingo de Obaldia; Federico Boyd; Rafael Aizpuru
- Preceded by: Position Established
- Succeeded by: José Domingo de Obaldía

Personal details
- Born: Manuel Amador Guerrero; 30 June 1833 Turbaco, Republic of New Granada
- Died: 2 May 1909 (aged 75) Panama City, Panama
- Party: Conservative Party
- Spouse: María Ossa Escobar
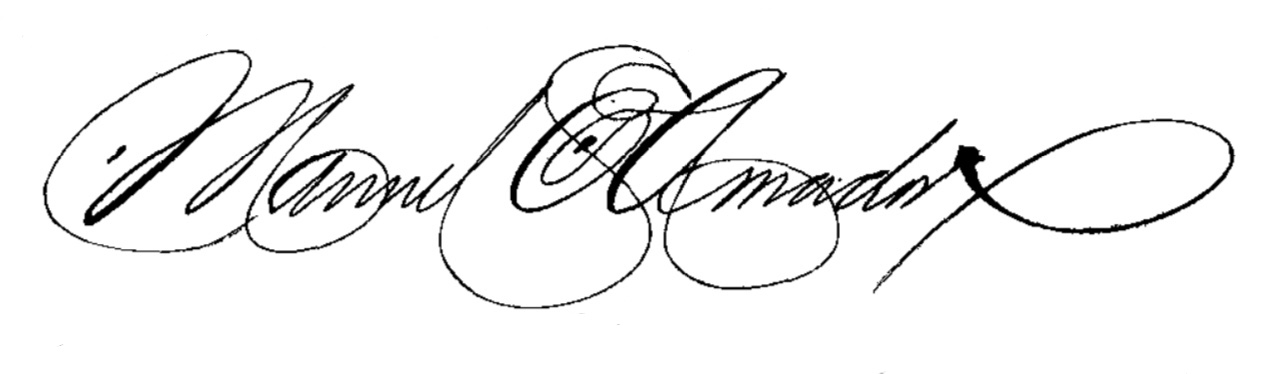
- Signature

Manuel Amador Guerrero (30 June 1833 – 2 May 1909), was the first president of Panama from 20 February 1904 to 1 October 1908. He was a member of the Conservative Party.

== Early life ==
Manuel Amador Guerrero was born on 30 June 1833 in Turbaco, in the Bolívar Department of the Republic of Colombia to María Mercedes Guerrero Córdoba and José María Amador Leguina. Very little is known about his childhood and teenage years, but he studied to be a surgeon and graduated from the Universidad de Magdalena e Istmo in 1854.

== Career ==
Amador came to Panama in 1855 settling in Colón and started working on the Panama Railroad as a doctor. After a year, he also took a job as the postmaster. After moving to Santiago de Veraguas, Amador began a export business "Amador Hermanos", with his brother, Juan De Dios Amador Guerrero, and continued his work as a doctor and in governmental posts. He acted to the District Administration, working on the Municipal Council, and serving as a deputy to the House of Representatives for the Veraguas State in the Republic of New Granada in Bogotá from 1858 to 1859. During the same period, he began serving in the State Legislature of Veraguas.

In 1866, Amador was appointed as the first successor for the Conservative Party, in the elections for the President of the Sovereign State of Panama. When the President Vicente Olarte Galindo died in office in 1868, Amador was to succeed his term as acting president but because he was running in the election, he chose to allow the second successor Juan José Díaz to take the post as acting president. When it became evident that Amador's victory was assured for the presidency, General Fernando Ponce staged a rebellion and drove the Conservative supporters out of the capital and back to Veraguas. In the brief battles that occurred, Amador was captured and sent into exile Cartagena.

In 1869, Amador returned to Panama, probably settling again in Santiago de Veraguas, where his son Manuel Encarnación del Carmen Amador Terreros was born to María de Jesús Terreros. He soon moved to Panama City and began working at the Hospital Santo Tomás. The hospital, a charity hospital built in colonial times, suffered from lack of management and funds, and Amador took on the task of managing and reorganizing it without pay for almost two decades of the twenty-nine years in which he worked there. He also opened and ran a pharmacy near the hospital on Avenue B. It is probable his first wife died, as on 6 February 1872, Amador married Manuela María Maximiliano de la Ossa Escobar. With de la Ossa, Amador had two children, Raúl Arturo, who as an adult was attached to the Panamanian consulate in New York City and Elmira María, who married William Ehrman, one of the owners of the Ehrman Banking Company.

== Return to politics ==
"Amador Hermanos" brought in brother, José Amador, and began working with the French company building the Panama Canal in 1879. Simultaneously, Manuel continued his work as a doctor for the Panama Canal Railway and Hospital Santo Tomás. In 1886, during the period when Colombia was reorganizing its sovereign states under a federal government, Amador served as the last President of the Sovereign State of Panamá, taking over the post vacated by Ramón Santodomingo Vila on 5 June 1886 and serving until 5 August 1886. During this time frame, Amador served as chairman of the Council of the District of Panama, which had to vote on approval of the Colombian Constitution of 1886. At the end of 1888, the French company which was digging the canal went bankrupt, causing the failure of the Amador brothers' business. José Amador died soon after the business closed, but Manuel covered the company's losses.

Amador favored continuing the canal project and when Lucien Bonaparte-Wyse made the journey to Bogotá in 1890 to gain a concession for a ten-year extension, he was accompanied by Amador. Instability plagued the French project and then in 1900, the Thousand Days' War erupted between Colombian political factions. The government in Bogotá asked the United States to protect the railway in Panama, causing the US Marines to intervene on the isthmus. In exchange for keeping the vital transit open, President José Manuel Marroquín pledged that he would insure that the United States would receive authorization to complete the canal upon restoration of peace. Amador wrote to President Marroquín, who was a personal friend, urging the approval of the Hay–Herrán Treaty. Rather than appointing a favorable candidate, Marroquín appointed an opponent to the ratification, Juan Bautista Pérez y Soto as Panama's congressman during the negotiations.

== Independence movement ==
The appointment caused José Agustín Arango to recruit his sons, Belisario, José Agustín and Ricardo Manuel; his sons-in-law Ernesto Tisdel Lefevre, Samuel Lewis, and Raoul Orillac; and a friend, Carlos Constantino Arosemena to begin working on a plan for the independence of Panama. The group was soon joined by Amador, who would become the leader of the independence movement, as well as by Ricardo and Tomás Arias, Federico Boyd, Manuel Espinosa Batista, and Nicanor de Obarrio. Contentious negotiations with Colombia led the United States toward backing the independence movement in Panama, believing that negotiations would be more favorable to American interests from a small, weak, newly developing state, rather than continuing to work with Colombia. Amador traveled to New York in September 1903 to determine how the United States might support the separation movement. After gaining approval for support from the USS Nashville, Amador returned to Panama to get a plan in motion.

The USS Nashville landed on 2 November 1903 off the coast of Colón. The following day, 500 sharpshooters, under the command of General Juan B. Tobar traveling aboard the cruiser Cartagena and merchant ship Alexander Bixio, made landfall. Fearing that if they were caught they would be executed, Amador, Arango, Boyd, and Espinosa met to discuss the situation, because with the landed troops many of their colleagues were abandoning the cause. Amador returned home dejected, fearing all was lost, but his wife María de la Ossa came up with a plan to separate the Colombian generals from their troops with help from friends on the railway. She surmised that once the officers were separated and arrested, the troops could be bribed to return home. Amador went out to convince Herbert G. Prescott, assistant superintendent, and James Shaler, superintendent of the Panama Railway to help transport the generals and once he gained their approval, he called the separatists together to get them to endorse the plan. Shaler convinced the generals to go ahead to Panama City without their troops, while the railway was gathering sufficient cars for the troops.

When the plan successfully concluded, Panama's independence was proclaimed and the Municipal Council met and confirmed the establishment of the Republic of Panama. Amador and Boyd were sent to Washington, D. C. to negotiate a treaty to complete the canal. When they arrived, they learned that Philippe-Jean Bunau-Varilla had already signed a treaty and as they were not empowered to accept it, the agreement was sent to Panama for ratification by the provisional government.

== Presidency ==
On 20 February 1904, the constitutional convention unanimously elected Amador as the first president of the Republic of Panama. Because the Constitution of Panama required that the president be native-born, a clause allowing Amador to serve based on his service to the independence movement was inserted. During his presidency, he established the gold Balboa as the official currency at par with the U. S. gold dollar. His administration adopted the flag, designed by his son Manuel and sewn by his wife and her sister-in-law, Angélica Bergamonta de la Ossa, and the national anthem, that features lyrics written by his wife's brother Jerónimo de la Ossa; created the national theater and national museum; disbanded the army, in favor of a police force; and expanded the educational system in the country.

One of the immediate actions of his administration was to resolve a difference in interpretation over the law which created the canal zone, passed on 28 April 1904. Panamanian legislators intended the granting of the zone to the United States to mean that the U.S. could exercise sovereignty "only for the purpose of building the canal". As the ports were vital for Panama's economy, the government of Panama had no intention of surrendering complete legal or economic sovereignty in the canal zone and did not cede its territory to the U.S. The Americans had established ports, customs houses and postal facilities in the zone, which were objected to by the Panamanians, as they had nothing to do with construction and were functions of a sovereign power. U.S. Minister to Panama Charles Edward Magoon, who was concurrently the Governor of the Canal Zone, worked with Amador to draft a working agreement to resolve the issue. Secretary of War William Howard Taft agreed with the main draft and went to Panama to meet with Amador, arriving on 27 November 1904. The three men devised an agreement to exempt only duty-free goods entering the canal zone ports of Ancon and Cristobal that were related to construction of the canal. Other goods were to be taxed by Panamanian authorities at a reduced rate of ten percent ad valorem. In exchange for infrastructure development with hospitals and roads, Amador was pleased to agree to allow the Canal Company to control sanitation and quarantine provisions in the zone and utilize municipal buildings. They also designated an agreement for currency sharing and postal regulations, among other revisions. The Taft Memorandum would affect U.S.-Panamanian relations for nearly 100 years.

Amador sought to disenfranchise Belisario Porras, the main leader of the Liberal Party. The Panama Supreme Court revoked Porras' citizenship. However, the Panama legislature restored his citizenship.

== Death and legacy ==
Amador decided not to run for reelection in 1908 and instead retired from public life. He died on May 2, 1909, in Panama City. His last coherent words were to express his wish that the National Anthem be played as his body was lowered into his grave, a wish that was realized.

== Trivia ==
- Plaza Amador, a popular football team in Panama's highest league, LPF, was named in his honour. Founded back in 1955 the club's colours are also red, blue and white as they were the colours adopted by his patriotic movement for independence.
- The Order of Manuel Amador Guerrero, the highest honour of Panama, is named in his honour.
- Fort Amador, an American military base at the Pacific (southern) end of the Panama Canal, is named in his honor.

== Bibliography ==
- Barrow, Robert M. (January 1966). "The First Panama Canal Crisis, 1904". Caribbean Studies. 5 (4). Río Piedras, Puerto Rico: Institute of Caribbean Studies, College of Social Sciences, University of Puerto Rico: 12–27. ISSN 0008-6533. JSTOR 25611907.
- Delpar, Helen (2013). "Amador Guerrero, Manuel". In Leonard, Thomas; Buchenau, Jurgen; Longley, Kyle; Mount, Graeme (eds.). Encyclopedia of U.S.-Latin American Relations. Thousand Oaks, California: SAGE Publications. p. 11. ISBN 978-1-60871-792-7.
- Harding, Robert C. (2006). The History of Panama. Westport, Connecticut: Greenwood Publishing Group. ISBN 978-0-313-33322-4.
- Haskins, William C, ed. (1908). Canal Zone Pilot. Ancón, Canal Zone, Panama: A. Bienkowski, Star & Herald Co. OCLC 23747701.
- Johnson, Willis Fletcher (1906). Four Centuries of the Panama Canal. New York, New York: Henry Holt and Co. OCLC 576076780.
- McCullough, David (2001). The Path Between the Seas: The Creation of the Panama Canal, 1870-1914. New York, New York: Simon and Schuster. ISBN 978-0-7432-0137-7.
- McGeachy, A. V. (3 November 1961). "November 3, 1903 Day of Destiny". The Panama Canal Review. 12 (4). Balboa Heights, Canal Zone, Panama: The Panama Canal Company: 3–6.
- Ospina Peña, Mariano (21 July 2017). Los Roosevelt, los magnates y Panama [Roosevelt, the Magnates and Panama] (in Spanish). Colombia: Así Sucedió. Archived from the original on 23 December 2017.
- Sanchez, Peter M. (2003). "Panama: A "Hegemonized" Foreign Policy". In Hey, Jeanne A. K. (ed.). Small States in World Politics: Explaining Foreign Policy Behavior. Boulder, Colorado: Lynne Rienner Publishers. pp. 53–74. ISBN 978-1-55587-943-3.

Political offices
Preceded by Position created	President of Panama; 1904–1908	Succeeded by José Domingo de Obaldía
