= El Panameño =

Colombian weekly newspaper (1849-57)

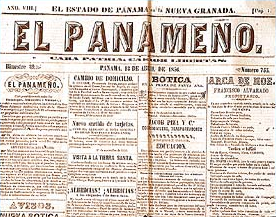
- Type: Weekly newspaper
- Founded: January 1, 1849
- Ceased publication: 1857
- Political alignment: Liberal
- Language: Spanish language
- Headquarters: Panama City, Colombia
- Sister newspapers: Panama Sun

El Panameño (English: The Panamanian) was a liberal weekly newspaper published from Panamá, Colombia 1849–1857. The first issue was published on January 1, 1849. Mariano Arosemena was the director of El Panameño. José Angel Santos was the editor of the newspaper. Dr. Mateo Iturralde, Santiago de la Guardia and Pablo Arosemena were prominent personalities in the team behind the newspaper.

Seeking to compete with The Panama Star the printers of El Panameño launched a short-lived English-language publication, Panama Sun.
