= William Nelson Cromwell =

American lawyer (1854–1948)

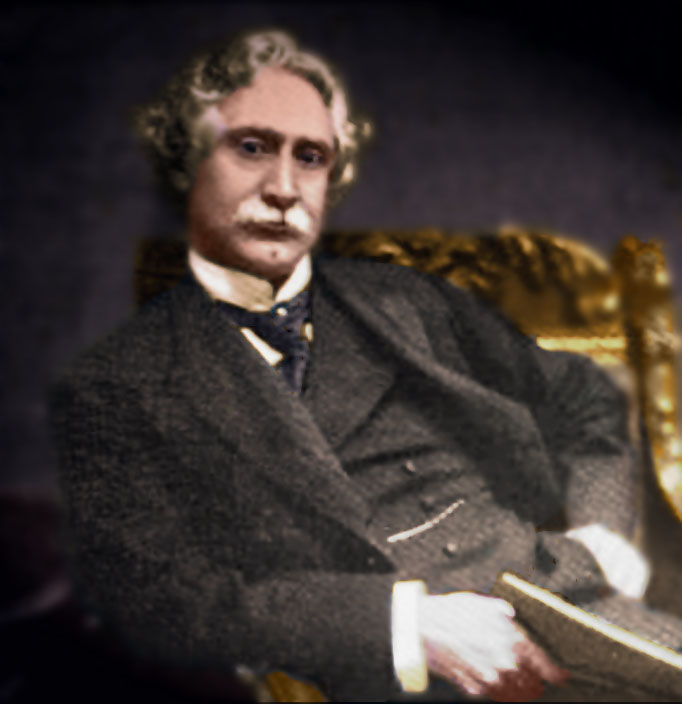
- Born: January 17, 1854; Brooklyn, New York, U.S.
- Died: July 19, 1948 (aged 94)
- Education: Columbia University
- Occupation: Lawyer
- Employer: Sullivan & Cromwell
- Political party: Republican
- Spouse: Jennie Osgood Nichols
- Parent(s): Sarah M. Brokaw and John Nelson Cromwell

William Nelson Cromwell (January 17, 1854 – July 19, 1948) was an American attorney active in promotion of the Panama Canal and other major ventures especially in cooperation with Philippe Bunau-Varilla.

== Life and career ==
He was born and raised in Brooklyn, New York, in an Episcopalian household, by his mother, Sarah M. Brokaw, a Civil War widow. His father, John Nelson Cromwell, died in the Battle of Vicksburg.

He worked as an accountant for the attorney Algernon Sydney Sullivan, who paid for his education at Columbia Law School and made him a partner in Sullivan & Cromwell in 1879. In 1898 the chief of the French Canal Syndicate (a group that owned large swathes of land across Panama), Philippe Bunau-Varilla, hired him to lobby the US Congress to build a canal across Panama, and not across Nicaragua, as rivals would have it. Cromwell showed that Nicaragua had an active volcano. On June 19, 1902, three days after senators received stamps showing volcanic activity in Nicaragua they voted for the Panama route for the canal. He received $800,000 for his lobbying efforts, and an additional $2 million following ratification of the Hay–Bunau-Varilla Treaty. This equates to about 70 million USD today and at the time, was the highest legal fee ever paid.

By 1907, he was a member of the Consolidated Stock Exchange of New York, one of around 13,000.

One of his main pro bono activities was helping the blind. Another was the founding of "the Society of Friends of Roumania" in 1920 under the patronage of Her Majesty Queen Marie of Romania. Under his tutelage, the New York-based Society promoted numerous exchanges between the two countries and published the distinguished Roumania – A Quarterly Review.
