= Carlos Antonio Mendoza =

President of Panama (1856–1916)

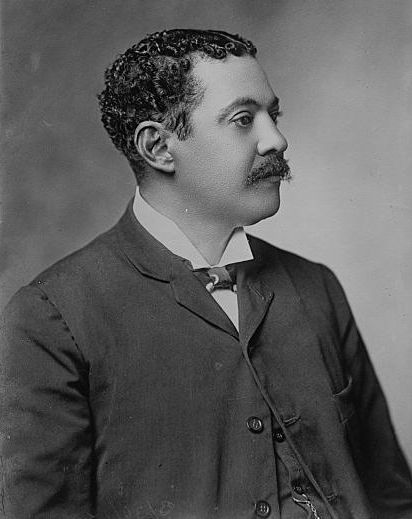

President of Panama
- In office 1 March 1910 – 1 October 1910
- Deputy: Presidential designates Juan M. Lambert; Pablo Arosemena; Federico Boyd; Rodolfo Chiari
- Preceded by: José Domingo de Obaldía
- Succeeded by: Federico Boyd

Personal details
- Born: Carlos Antonio Mendoza Soto; October 31, 1856 Panama City, Province of Panama, Republic of New Granada
- Died: February 13, 1916 (aged 59)
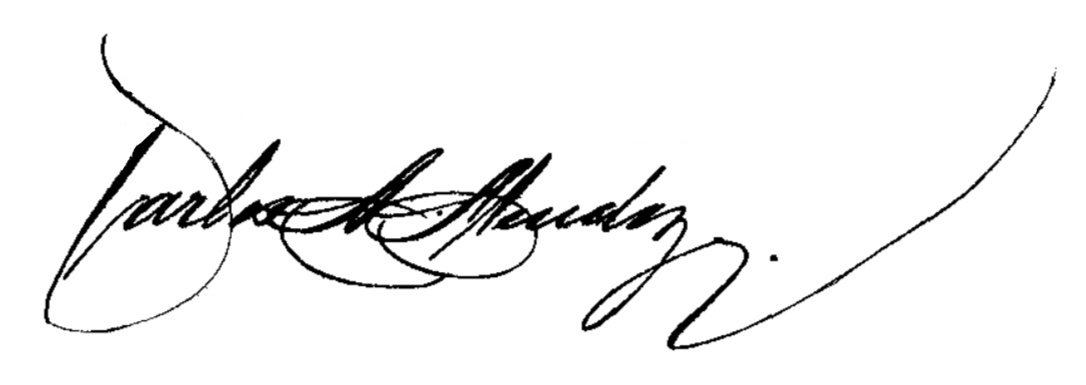
- Signature

Carlos Antonio Mendoza Soto (31 October 1856, in Panama City – 13 February 1916) was a Panamanian politician who served in 1908 and 1909 as the second presidential designate in the government of José Domingo de Obaldía. After the death of the first presidential designate José Agustín Arango in 1909 he was first in line to the presidency. In that capacity, Mendoza became President of Panama from 1 March 1910 to 1 October 1910. He belonged to the Liberal Party.

Mendoza was a participant in the 1903 revolution and played a role in the writing of the Panama Constitution.

Mendoza was elected as the third presidential designate by the National Assembly for the 1904–1906 term.

He came from a family of soldiers and politicians.

Political offices
| Preceded by José Domingo de Obaldía | President of Panama; March 1910 – October 1910 | Succeeded by Federico Boyd |
