= Pablo Arosemena =

President of Panama (1836–1920)

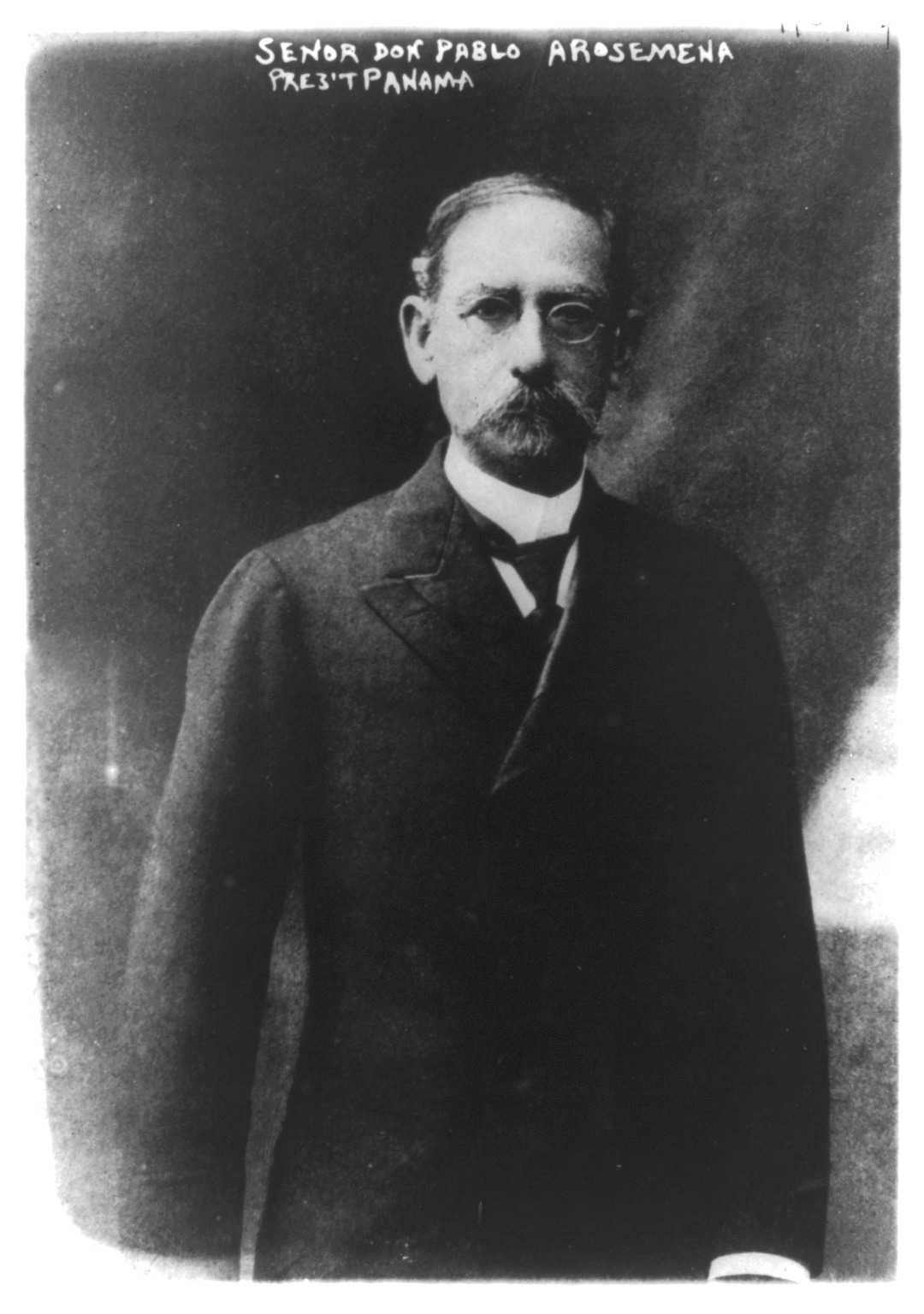
- Pablo Arosemena, 1910

President of Panama
- In office 5 October 1910 – 1 October 1912
- Deputy: Presidential designates Federico Boyd; Rodolfo Chiari
- Preceded by: Federico Boyd
- Succeeded by: Belisario Porras

Personal details
- Born: Pablo Arosemena Alba; September 24, 1836
- Died: August 19, 1920 (aged 83)
- Party: Conservative Party
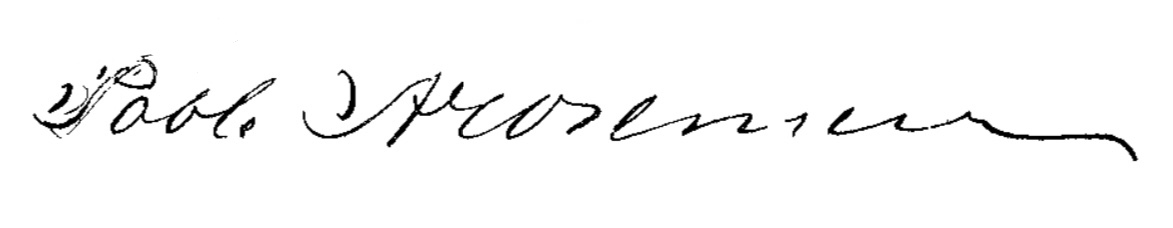
- Signature

Pablo Arosemena Alba (24 September 1836 – 19 August 1920) was the first presidential designate of Panama at the time of resignation of Carlos Antonio Mendoza, and in that capacity became the President of Panama from 5 October 1910 to 1 October 1912.

He was elected as the first presidential designate by the National Assembly for the term 1904-1906 and again for the term 1910–1912.

== See also ==
- El Panameño

Political offices
Preceded by Federico Boyd	President of Panama; 1910–1912	Succeeded by Belisario Porras
