= Hay–Herrán Treaty =

1903 treaty between the United States and Colombia

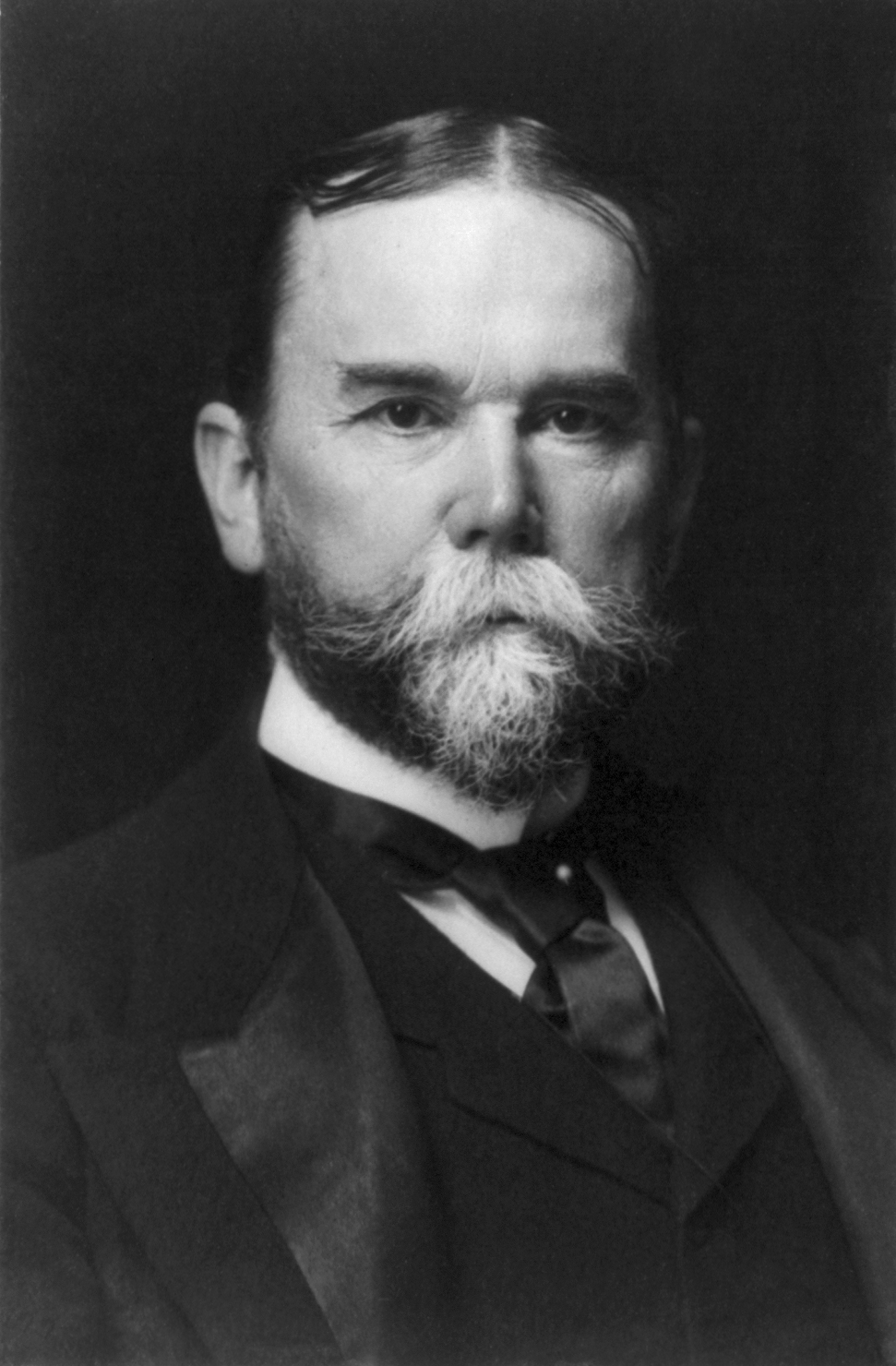
John Hay

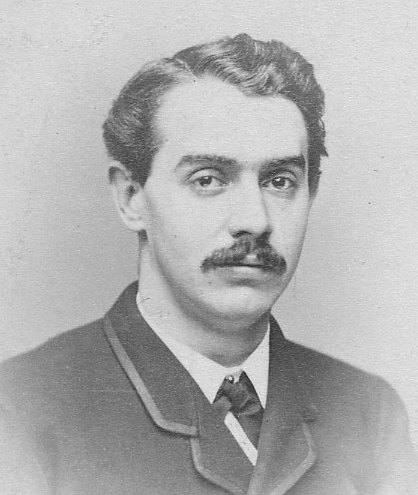
Tomás Herrán

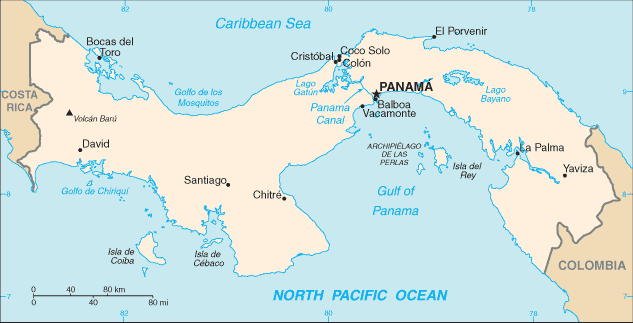
Map of Panama, with Panama Canal

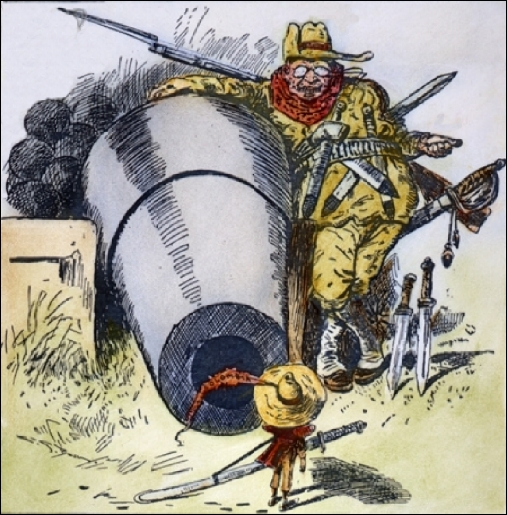
1903 political cartoon: "Go Away, Little Man, and Don't Bother Me"

The Hay–Herrán Treaty was a treaty signed on January 22, 1903, between United States Secretary of State John M. Hay and the diplomat Tomás Herrán of Colombia. Had it been ratified, it would have allowed the United States a renewable lease of 100 years on a six-mile-wide strip across the isthmus of Panama (then part of Colombia) for $10 million and an annual payment of $250,000, both payments being in gold coin. It was ratified by the United States Senate on March 14, but it was not ratified by the Senate of Colombia, so it had no effect.

It has been considered by later observers that this happened mainly because Herrán had negotiated the treaty with little government or legislative oversight. It has also been mentioned that many of the politicians and congressmen found the amount offered to fall short, considering that the United States was willing to pay $40 million for the New Panama Canal Company and its construction equipment and excavations.

The United States government was not willing to renegotiate the treaty with Colombia or alter the amounts involved and soon gave its support, both political and military, to a planned uprising in Panama, which led to its independence and to the eventual construction of the Panama Canal.

== See also ==
- Spooner Act
- Clayton–Bulwer Treaty
- Hay–Pauncefote Treaty
- Hay–Bunau-Varilla Treaty
- Separation of Panama from Colombia
