= Hay–Bunau-Varilla Treaty =

1903 treaty between U.S. and Panama establishing the Panama Canal Zone

Convention for the Construction of a Ship Canal to Connect the Waters of the Atlantic and Pacific Oceans
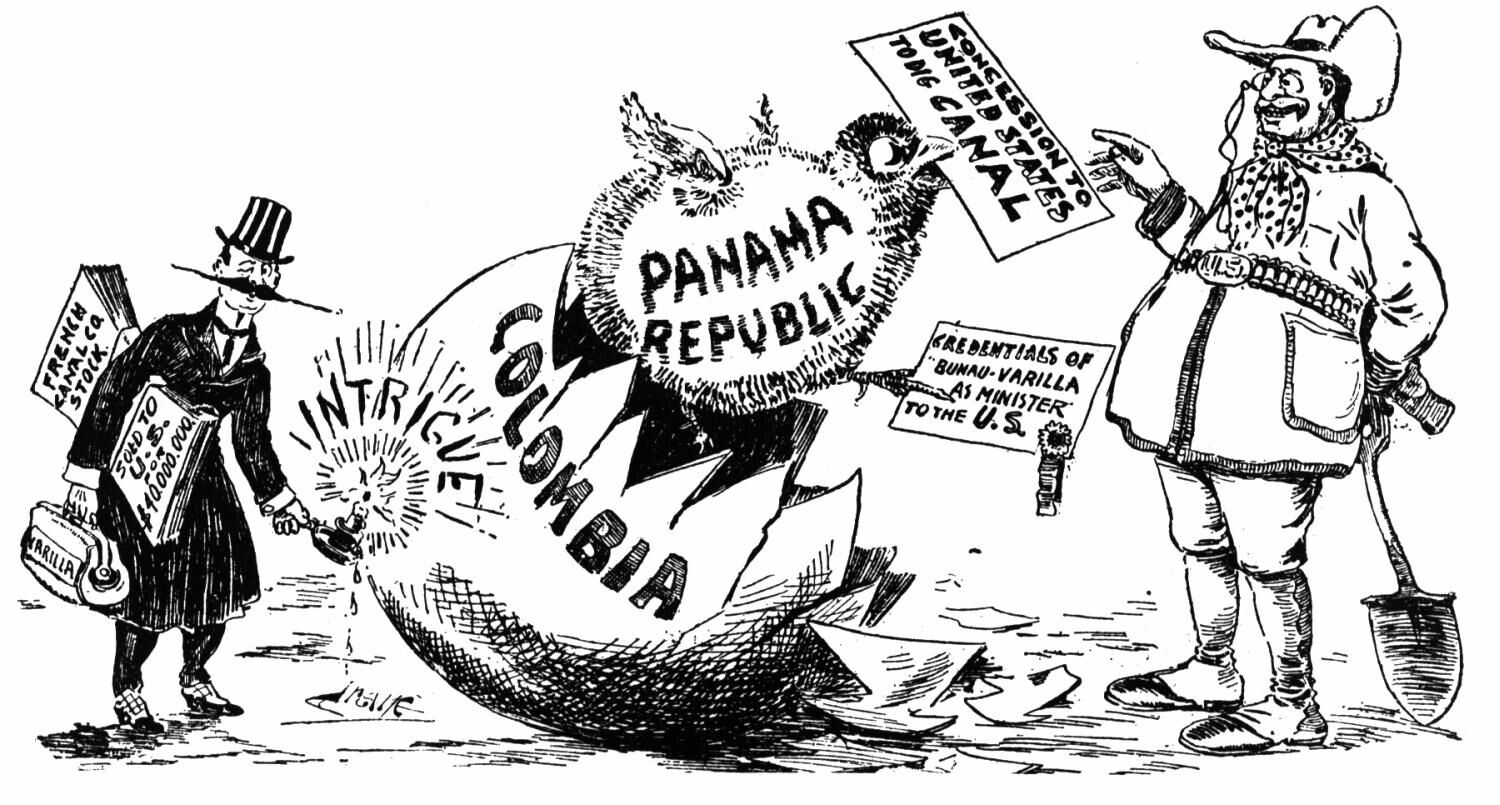
- 1903 editorial cartoon on the treaty
- Type: Bilateral treaty
- Signed: 18 November 1903
- Location: Washington, D.C., U.S.
- Effective: 26 February 1904
- Condition: Exchange of ratifications
- Expiration: 1 October 1979
- Negotiators: John Hay; Philippe-Jean Bunau-Varilla
- Original signatories: Panama; United States
- Ratifiers: Panama; United States
- Depositaries: United States government
- Citations: 33 Stat. 2234; Treaty Series 431
- Language: English

Full text
- Hay–Bunau-Varilla Treaty at Wikisource
- Replaced by the Torrijos–Carter Treaties in 1979.

The Hay–Bunau-Varilla Treaty (Spanish: Tratado Hay-Bunau Varilla) was a treaty signed on November 18, 1903, by the United States and Panama, which established the Panama Canal Zone and the subsequent construction of the Panama Canal. It was named after its two primary negotiators, Philippe-Jean Bunau-Varilla, the French diplomatic representative of Panama, and United States secretary of state John Hay.

== Background ==
From 1882, Ferdinand de Lesseps, who had built the Suez Canal, started work on a canal traversing the Isthmus of Panama, which was then part of Colombia. By 1889, with engineering challenges caused by frequent landslides, slippage of equipment and mud, plus disease, the effort failed in bankruptcy. After the collapse of the de Lesseps efforts to build the Panama Canal, Bunau-Varilla became an important shareholder of the Compagnie Nouvelle du Canal de Panama, which still had the concession, as well as certain valuable assets, for the building of a canal in Panama.

The US intent to influence the area, especially the Panama Canal's construction and control, led to the separation of Panama from Colombia in 1903 and its establishment as an independent state.

The US had negotiated the Hay–Herrán Treaty with Colombia in early 1903 that would give it control of the canal and would include the purchase of the French-held land for $40 million. When the Congress of Colombia rejected that Treaty on August 12, 1903, Bunau-Varilla and the other French investors were faced with the prospect of losing everything. Justly confident that American President Theodore Roosevelt would support his initiative, he met with Manuel Amador, the leader of the Panamanian independence movement, in a suite in the Waldorf-Astoria hotel in New York where he wrote him a $100,000 check to fund a renewed Panamanian revolt. In return, Bunau-Varilla would become Panama's representative in Washington.

In November 1903 Panama, tacitly supported by the United States, proclaimed its independence, and on November 13, the United States formally recognized the Republic of Panama. Although not Panamanian himself, Bunau-Varilla was promptly appointed Panamanian ambassador to the United States. He had not, however, been in Panama for seventeen years, nor did he ever return.

The treaty was negotiated in Washington, D.C., and New York City. As part of the Hay–Bunau-Varilla negotiations, the U.S. bought the shares and assets of the Compagnie Nouvelle du Canal de Panama for $40 million as originally stipulated in the Hay–Herrán Treaty.

== Terms ==
The terms of the treaty stated that the United States was to receive rights to a canal zone which was to extend five miles on either side of the canal route in perpetuity, and Panama was to receive a payment from the U.S. up to $10 million and an annual rental payment of $250,000. Panama never legally became a colony of the United States; the Hay–Bunau-Varilla Treaty gave the United States governance only in the Canal Zone.

== Aftermath ==
This treaty was a source of conflict between Panama and the United States since its creation. The Canal Zone became a racially and socially segregated area, set aside from the country of Panama. The push for environmental determinism seemed to be the best framework to justify American practices in Panama. The conflict from the treaty reached its peak on January 9, 1964, with riots over sovereignty of the Panama Canal Zone. The riot started after a Panamanian flag was torn during conflict between Panamanian students and Canal Zone Police officers, over the right of the Panamanian flag to be flown alongside the U.S. flag. U.S. Army units became involved in suppressing the violence after the Canal Zone Police were overwhelmed. After three days of fighting, about 22 Panamanians and four U.S. soldiers were killed. This day is known in Panama as Martyrs' Day.

The events of January 9 were considered to be a significant factor in the U.S. decision to negotiate the 1977 Torrijos–Carter Treaties, which finally abolished the Hay–Bunau-Varilla Treaty and allowed the gradual transfer of control of the Canal Zone to Panama and the handover of full control of the Panama Canal on December 31, 1999.

== See also ==
- Clayton–Bulwer Treaty
- Hay–Pauncefote Treaty
- Hay–Herrán Treaty
