= Isthmus Department =

Coordinates: 8°58′N 79°32′W

Isthmus Department Departamento del Istmo
- 1824–1831
- Isthmus Department (red) within Gran Colombia
- Status: Department of Gran Colombia
- Capital: Panamá
- Religion: Roman Catholic
- Government: Federal republic
- History
  - Established: 1824
  - Disestablished: 1831

Population
  - 1825 estimate: 80,000
- Currency: Peso
Preceded by
Cundinamarca Department
Succeeded by
Province of Panama (New Granada)
Province of Veragua (New Granada)
Mosquito Coast (New Granada)
- Today part of: Panama, parts of Costa Rica and Nicaragua

The Department of the Isthmus (Spanish: Departamento del Istmo, also known as the Isthmus Department or Department of Panama) was one of the departments of the Republic of Gran Colombia. It was created in 1824 and named after the Isthmus of Panama. It covered the territory of what is now the country of Panama and some disputed coastal territories farther northward along the Caribbean shoreline of present-day Costa Rica and Nicaragua (Mosquito Coast).

After the Thousand Days' War and the influence of the United States to build the Panama Canal the former Department of Gran Colombia separated from Colombia and became the Republic of Panama.

== History ==
The region of Panama was part of the Spanish Empire during the wars of independence against the Spanish. On November 28, 1821, Panama proclaimed its independence from Spain. Independence was achieved without bloodshed and with the participation of the most prominent men of the country, who through their financial contributions neutralized the Spanish army that guarded the Isthmus. Panama's independence movement began on November 10, 1821 with the independence of the Villa de Los Santos led by Segundo Villarreal; eighteen days later, on November 28, after the patriot victory at the Battle of Carabobo, there was emancipation from the Spanish Empire and Panama's decision to voluntarily join Gran Colombia was officially proclaimed.

Several factors influenced the final decision to join Panama to Gran Colombia, instead of Peru, its main trading partner during the Spanish colonial era. Of these, the most important to join Gran Colombia was the figure of Simón Bolívar, who at that time was at the height of his glory and popularity.

Up until this point, Panama had remained within the Spanish monarchy and had avoided the troubles afflicting the rest of the Viceroyalty of New Granada. On November 28, 1821 Panama was voluntarily annexed to Gran Colombia under the Constitution of Cúcuta, which had been promulgated on August 30, 1819. On February 9, 1822, by Executive Decree of the Vice President of Gran Colombia, Francisco de Paula Santander, the Isthmus Department was provisionally created until the next meeting of Congress, with the same rights granted to the original departments created by the law of October 2, 1821. He also divided it into two provinces: Panamá and Veraguas.

The Isthmus was characterized by a strong tendency towards autonomism, as an early antecedent we have the tenacious opposition of its political class, against the adoption of the Bolivian constitution that was intended to be implemented in Gran Colombia, despite all the efforts of the special envoy of Simón Bolívar and the pressure exerted by the intendant and military chief in the Isthmus.

In 1826, the same year in which the Isthmus rejected the Bolivian constitution, the Congress of Panama was held in the capital of the department. But this remarkable event was not an obstacle for the first attempt of separation from Colombia to take place in that year. It so happened that the Congress of Colombia ignored the requests for commercial franchises for the Isthmus, which frustrated Panamanian aspirations. Consequently, a separatist movement arose to turn Panama into a Hanseatic country, under the protection of the United Kingdom and the United States. The movement was, however, repressed by the Colombian military stationed on the Isthmus.

Regarding concrete separations, the first was carried out under the leadership of General José Domingo Espinar, who separated the Isthmus on September 26, 1830. However, he returned to reintegrate it to Gran Colombia on December 11 of the same year. The second attempt was made by Colonel Juan Eligio Alzuru on July 9, 1831, following the example of Venezuela and Ecuador. But the movement was suffocated and its leaders executed on August 29 of that year by orders of General Tomás de Herrera.

== Administrative divisions ==
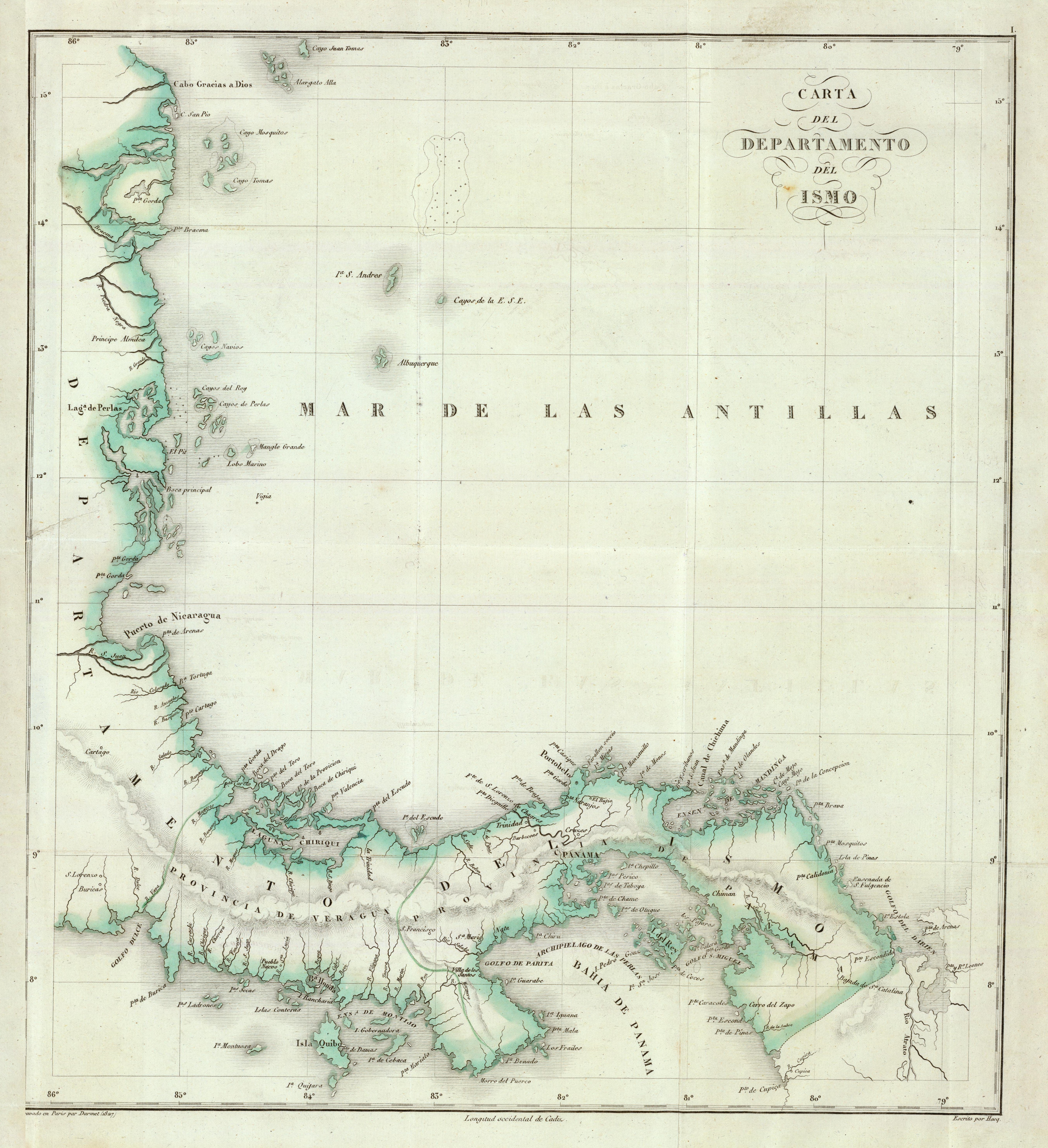
Map of the Isthmus Department from 1827

The department of the Isthmus was constituted with the territory of the current Republic of Panama, the north of the current department of Chocó, and the Costa Rican southern Pacific (from Punta Burica to the Golfo Dulce). In 1824, by means of the Law of Territorial Division of the Republic of Colombia [es], the department was subdivided into provinces. According to the laws of Gran Colombia, the civil government of the department was headed by an intendant and the military authority was represented by the General Commander of the department.

According to the provisions of the Law of Division of Colombia of June 25, 1824, the department consisted of two provinces and 10 cantons:

- Province of Panama. Capital: Panama City. In 1822 it consisted of six cantons: Panama, Portobelo, Darien del Sur, Nata and Los Santos. In 1824 the province of Panama included the cantons of Panama, Portobelo, Yaviza (formerly Darien del Sur), Nata, Los Santos and Chorrera.
- Province of Veraguas. Capital: Santiago de Veraguas. In 1822 it consisted of two cantons: Santiago and Alanje. In 1824 the province of Veraguas was made up of the cantons of Santiago, Alanje, La Mesa and Gaimí (head of Remedios).

Outside of these provinces, it also notionally included coastal territories farther northward along the Caribbean shoreline of present-day Costa Rica and Nicaragua. Control over this part of the Mosquito Coast was disputed with the British and the Federal Republic of Central America.

== See also ==
- History of Panama
- History of the Panama Canal
- Panama–Colombia separation
