= Demetrio H. Brid =

Panamanian politician (1859-1917)

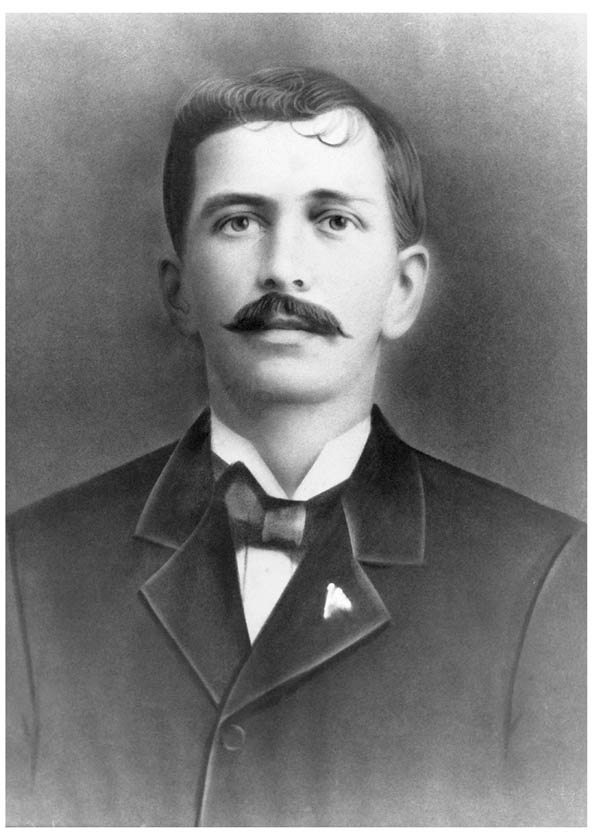
Demetrio H. Brid

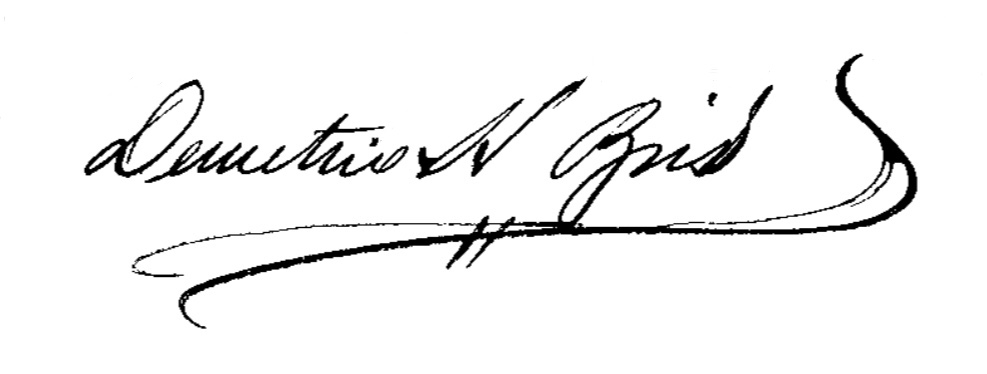
Signature

Demetrio Honorato Brid Lasso (December 21, 1859 – May 27, 1917) was a Panamanian politician who is considered the first de facto President of the Republic of Panama. He was a Conservative.

A Panamanian newspaper editor and a humanist who had an active participation in the events that led to the independence of Panama from Colombia and the founding of the Republic of Panama in 1903. As President of the Municipal Council of Panama, Demetrio Brid was decisive in convening the municipal corporation in the evening of November 3, 1903 to back the separatist movement and proclaim independence. Being the highest authority in power in the territory, as a result of the emergence of a de facto government, he designated on the afternoon of November 4 the three members who would conform an interim government (Junta de Gobierno Provisional) to run the affairs of the new republic. As such, he has been recognized by the Government of Panama and historians as the "First President of the de Facto Government" and Founding Father at the highest level".

Born in the Department of Panama on December 21, 1859, to Dr. Federico Alberto Brid Chirino, a lawyer in the Panama Railroad Company from Cartagena, Colombia and the Panamanian Josefa Cayetana Lasso y Paredes. He died at the age of 57.
