= Independence Act of Panama =

1821 proclamation of independence from Spain

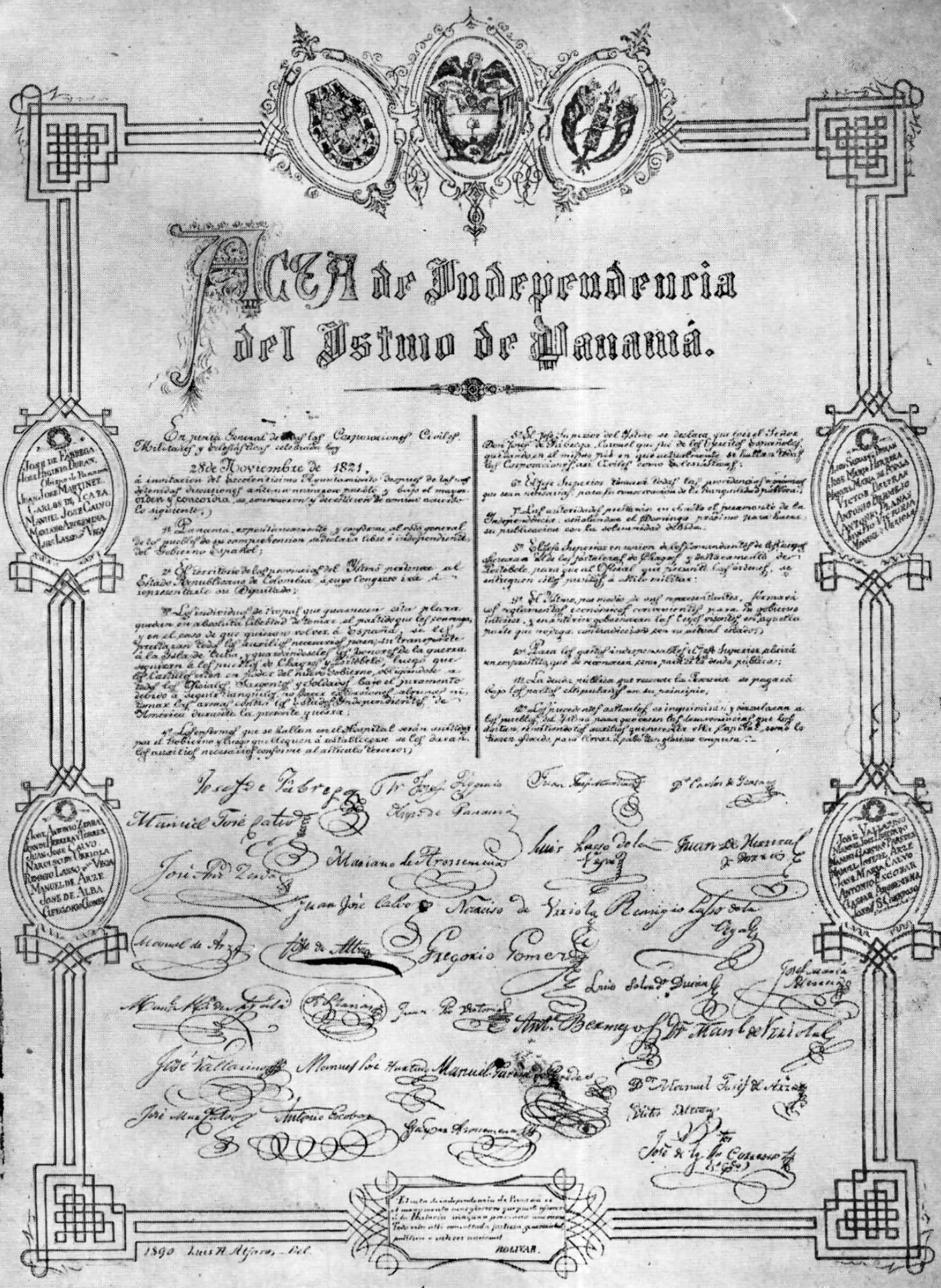
Independence Act of Panama, 1821

The Declaration of Independence of Panama (Acta de Independencia de Panamá) is the document through which Panama declared its independence from the Spanish Empire on November 28, 1821. It was proclaimed in the Cathedral Plaza of Panama City after a council of leaders had met and drafted twelve points calling for severing Panama's relationship with the Spanish Crown and joining with the newly formed Republic of Gran Colombia.

== Background ==
After rebels in the small provincial town of Villa de los Santos issued the "Primer Grito de Independencia de la Villa de Los Santos" (Shout for Independence), on 10 November 1821, rebels throughout the Panamanian countryside began demanding independence. Using bribes to quell resistance from the Spanish troops and garner their desertion, the rebels gained control of Panama City without bloodshed. An open meeting was held with merchants, landowners, and elites, who fearing retaliation from Spain and interruption of trade decided to join the Republic of Gran Colombia and drafted the Independence Act of Panama.

== The "Declaration" ==
The Declaration of Independence was drafted on 28 November 1821 by the educator and diplomat Manuel José Hurtado and consisted of twelve articles. The text is as follows:

"In a general meeting of all civilian, military and ecclesiastical corporations held today 28 November 1821 at the invitation of the City Council, after more arrested discussions before a large village meeting and under the highest order and harmony were agreed and decreed by common agreement the following items:

1. Panama, spontaneously and under the general vote of the people of understanding, is declared free and independent of the Spanish government.
2. The territory of the provinces of the Isthmus belongs to the Republic of Gran Colombia, to whose Congress our deputy will promptly go to represent us.
3. Individuals of the troops garrisoned in this place have the absolute freedom to make the choice that suits them, and if they want to return to Spain, they will be provided all the necessary aid for transport to the island of Cuba; in keeping with the honors of war, those that will remain at the ports of Chagres or Portobelo, then shall make the garrisons the possessions of the new government; putting under obligation all the officers, sergeants and soldiers, under due oath, to remain calm, to not accept any bribes, nor to take up weapons against the independent states of America during the present war.
4. Spanish patients who are in hospital will be assisted by the government, and once they return to health will presented with the necessary assistance in accordance with Article 3.
5. The Head of State of the Isthmus is stated to be Don José de Fábrega, who was a colonel with the Spanish armies; all corporations and authorities, civil and ecclesiastical shall be on the same footing that they are currently.
6. The Head of State shall take all economic measures that may be necessary for the preservation of the public peace.
7. The authorities will give at once the oath of independence, distinguishing next Sunday for its publication with the due solemnity.
8. The Head of State, together with the commanders of the troops, will notify the fortress of Chagres and detachment of Portobelo so that the official who presents the orders delivers these points in military style.
9. The Isthmus, by means of its representatives, will form the suitable economic regulations for its internal government; and in the meantime, they will govern according to the current laws in those parts that do not contradict the current state.
10. For necessary expenses, the political Head of State will create a loan to be recognized as part of the public debt.
11. The public debt is recognized by the Treasury and shall be paid under the covenants set forth in its principle.
12. The preceding chapters will be printed and circulated to all the peoples of the Isthmus to cease the disagreements agitating them; sending the help that this capital needs to carry out this glorious undertaking, as they have offered.

Signed by: José de Fábrega; José Hijinio, bishop of Panama; Juan José Martínez (dean of the cathedral chapter); Dr. Carlos Icaza; Manuel José Calvo; Mariano de Arosemena; Luis Lasso de la Vega; José Antonio Cerda; Juan Herrera y Torres; Juan José Calvo; Narciso de Urriola; Remigio Lasso de la Vega; Manuel de Arce; José de Alba; Gregorio Gómez; Luis Salvador Durán; José María Herrera; Manuel María de Ayala; Víctor Beltrán; Antonio Bermejo; Antonio Plana; Juan Pío Victoria; Dr. Manuel de Urriola; José Vallarino; Manuel José Hurtado, Manuel García de Paredes; Dr. Manuel José de Arce; José María Calvo; Antonio Escovar; Gaspar Arosemena José de los Santos Correoso, public scribe.

José Vallarino Jiménez was chosen to inform the people gathered in the Cathedral Plaza of Panama City of the Declaration of Independence. The news was received with jubilation. A letter advising Simón Bolívar of the declaration and Panama's voluntary decision to join with Republic of Gran Colombia was sent. In his acknowledgement, dated 1 February 1822, Bolívar replied:

El Acta de Independencia de Panamá es el monumento más glorioso que pueda ofrecer a la Historia ninguna provincia americana. Todo está allí consultado: justicia, generosidad, política e interés nacional. (The Declaration of Independence of Panama is the most glorious monument that could be offered to the History of any American province. Everything has been considered: justice, generosity, politics and national interest.)

— - Simón Bolívar to José de Fábrega (1 February 1822)
