= José Agustín Arango =

Panamanian politician

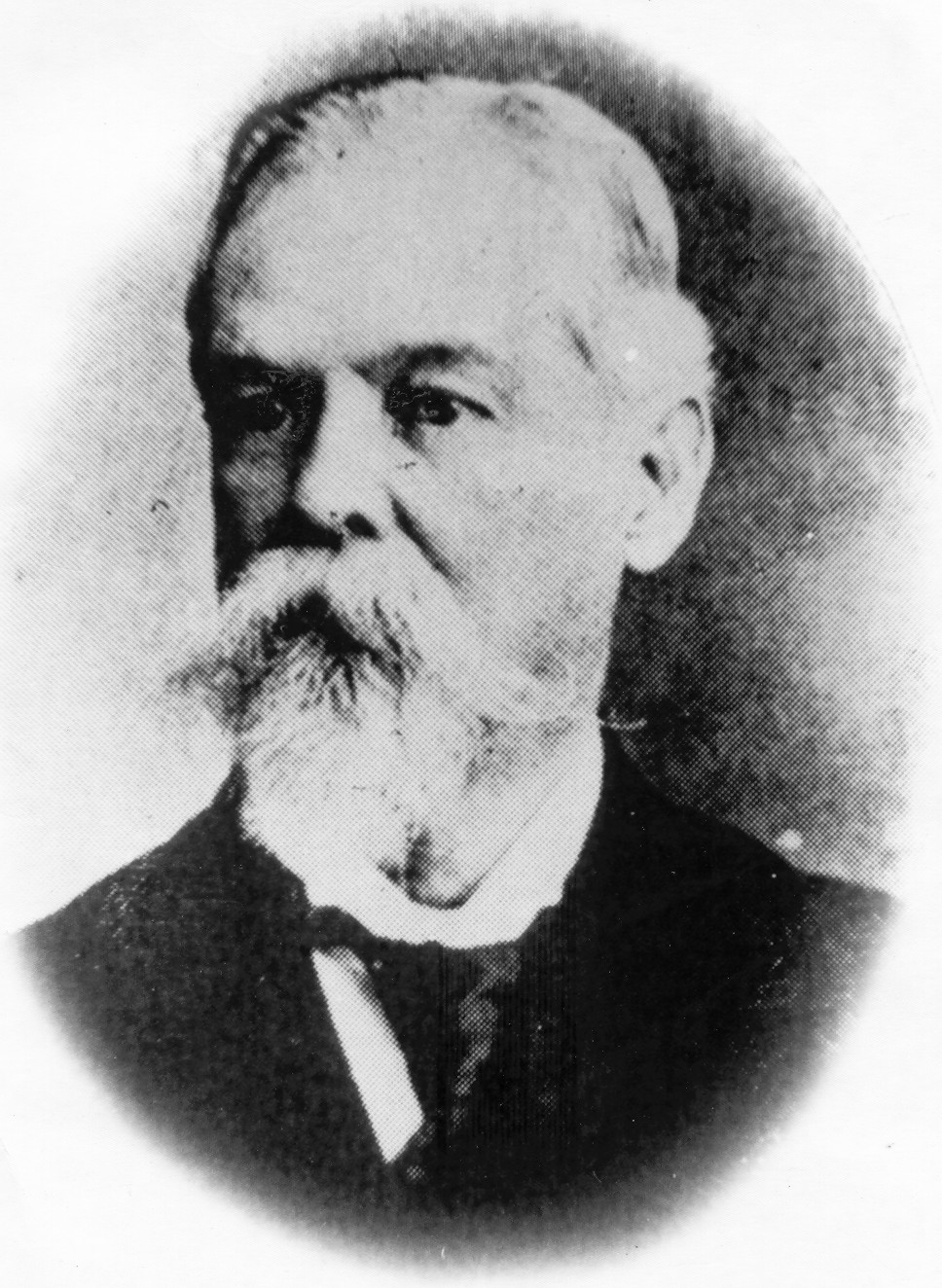
José Agustín Arango

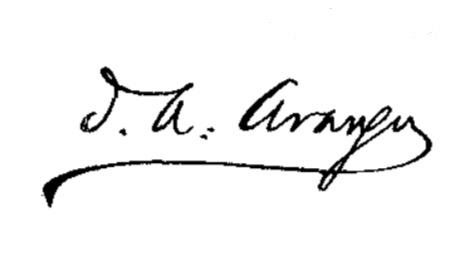
Signature

José Agustín Arango Remón (February 24, 1841 - May 10, 1909) was a Panamanian politician who was, together with Tomás Arias and Federico Boyd, a member of the provisional junta that governed Panama after its independence in 1903. He was the Chairman of the Provisional Government Junta from 4 November 1903 until 20 February 1904.

He was elected as the first presidential designate by the National Assembly for the term 1908–1910, but he died in May 1909, before completing his term.
