= Federico Boyd =

President of Panama (1851–1924)

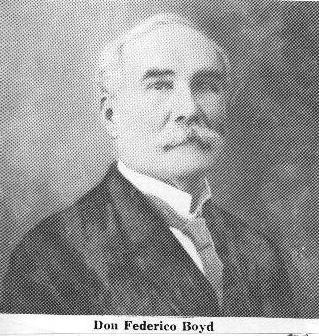

Acting President of Panama
- In office 1 October 1910 – 5 October 1910
- Preceded by: Carlos Antonio Mendoza
- Succeeded by: Pablo Arosemena

Personal details
- Born: Federico Augusto Boyd López; 24 September 1851; Panama City, Republic of New Granada
- Died: 12 May 1924 (aged 72); New York City, U.S.

Federico Augusto Boyd López (24 September 1851 – 25 May 1924) was the acting President of Panama from 1 October 1910 to 5 October 1910. He belonged to the Liberal Party.

Boyd was born in Panama City on 24 September 1851 to Archibaldo B. Boyd and Maria Lopez de Boyd. He was a businessman who became an active member of the Patriotic Revolutionary Junta that struggled to get Panama's independence from Colombia. He fought in favor of his country without thinking of the danger of the actions he undertook. He served in several positions: member of the Panama City Town Hall (1888); member of the Provisional Government Junta (1903); National Assembly senator (1910); head of state of Panama (1910); foreign relations minister (1911–1912); ambassador and minister in Germany, Netherlands, and Belgium; and General Consul and business representative in Honduras and El Salvador.

Boyd was elected as the second presidential designate by the National Assembly for the term 1906–1908. He was elected as the second presidential designate for the term 1910–1912, and as the first presidential designate for the term 1920–1922.

Boyd's talent as a public speaker brought him to represent Panama's interests before the Colombian Government. He presented a petition to obtain a delay in the negotiations with the French Government to build Panama Canal. Later on, his intervention made negotiations possible with the U.S. Government for the construction of an interoceanic canal through the Isthmus of Panama.

Boyd died in New York City on 25 May 1924, aged 72.

== Sources ==
• Mellander, Gustavo A., Mellander, Nelly, Charles Edward Magoon: The Panama Years. Río Piedras, Puerto Rico: Editorial Plaza Mayor; ISBN 1-56328-155-4 / OCLC 42970390 (1999)

• Mellander, Gustavo A., The United States in Panamanian Politics: The Intriguing Formative Years." Danville, Ill.: Interstate Publishers; OCLC 138568 (1971)

Political offices
Preceded by Carlos Antonio Mendoza	President of Panama; 1 October 1910 – 5 October 1910	Succeeded by Pablo Arosemena
