= 1984 Panamanian general election =

6 May 1984
- Presidential election
- Turnout: 73.13%
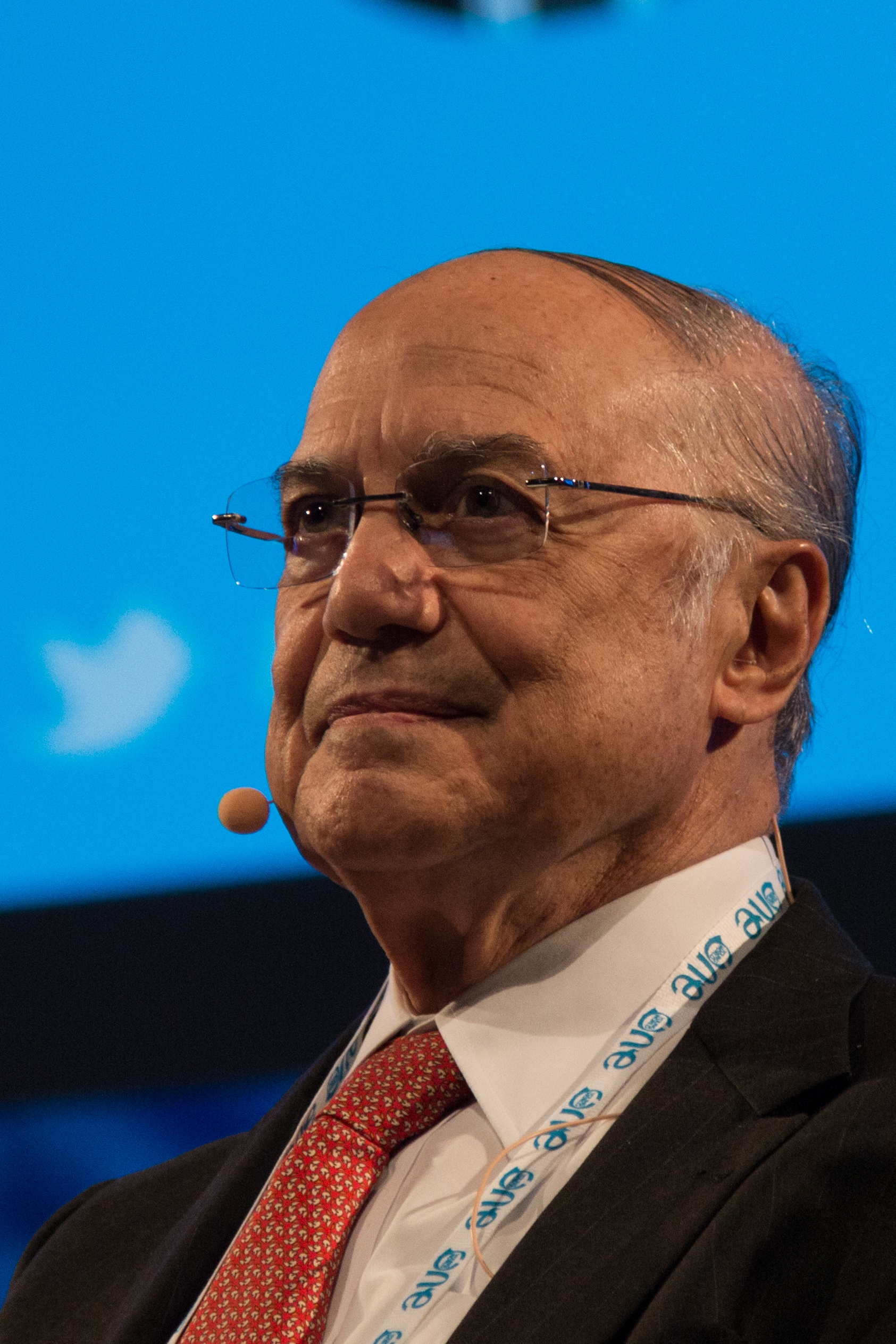

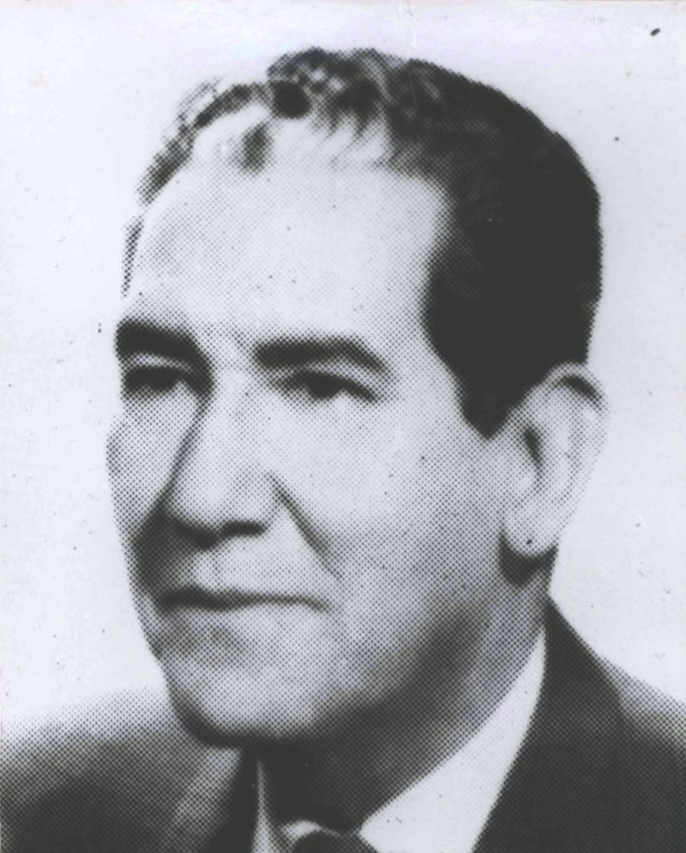
Nominee	Nicolás Ardito Barletta	Arnulfo Arias Madrid
Party	PRD	MOLIRENA
Running mate	Eric Arturo Delvalle	Mireya Moscoso-Arias
Popular vote	300,748	299,035
Percentage	46.98%	46.71%
President before election
Jorge Illueca
Independent
Elected President
Nicolás Ardito Barletta
PRD

General elections were held in Panama on 6 May 1984, electing both a new President of the Republic and a new Legislative Assembly.

== Background ==
Under October 1978 legislation, eight parties had met quotas of 30,000 valid signatures by 1 April 1983, in order to legally nominate candidates in future elections.

On 24 April 1983 the electorate overwhelmingly approved a number of amendments to the 1972 constitution in a referendum. Among the changes were the replacement of the existing 505-member National Assembly of Municipal Representatives by a national legislature of 70 members, and empowering this body to appoint high-ranking government officials, which had been the responsibility of the President.

In August 1983 a new law created an Electoral Tribunal consisting of one each member appointed by the executive, legislative and judicial branches. The tribunal was given ultimate authority to interpret and implement electoral rules. A national vote-counting board was formed to process election returns and report to the Electoral Tribunal.

General Paredes, in keeping with the new constitutional provision that no active Guard member could participate in an election, reluctantly retired from the Guard on 12 August 1983. He was succeeded immediately by Noriega, who was promoted to brigadier general. During the same month, Paredes was nominated as the PRD candidate for president. National elections were only five months away, and Paredes appeared to be the leading presidential contender. Nevertheless, in early September, President de la Espriella purged his cabinet of Paredes loyalists, and Noriega declared that he would not publicly support any candidate for president. These events convinced Paredes that he had no official government or military backing for his candidacy. He withdrew from the presidential race on 6 September 1983, less than a month after retiring from the Guard. Although Paredes subsequently gained the support of the Popular Nationalist Party (PNP) and was able to appear on the 1984 ballot, he was no longer a major presidential contender. Constitutional reforms notwithstanding, the reality of Panamanian politics dictated that no candidate could become president without the backing of the National Guard and, especially, its commander.

President Ricardo de la Espriella resigned on 13 February 1984 and his vice-president Jorge Illueca assumed the presidency. The resignation of President and his cabinet was barely noticed during the intense election campaign. De la Espriella was forced out by Noriega, having "opposed the military's manipulation of the election and strongly advocated free elections for 1984".

== Campaign ==
The two primary candidates in the presidential race were opposition candidate Arnulfo Arias and Noriega's selection, Ardito Barletta. Due to the near total media control of Noriega's Democratic Revolutionary Party (PRD), the only media outlet to endorse Arias was the independent newspaper La Prensa.

The American Institute for Free Labor Development and the National Endowment for Democracy provided around $20,000 in support of activists involved with Ardito Barletta's campaign, despite opposition from certain U.S. legislators such as Representative Hank Brown and Senator Edward Zorinsky, alongside Ambassador Everett Ellis Briggs.

== Results ==
Counting of votes was stopped early, then suspended on 9 May. On 12 May Barletta had 319,671 votes and Arias had 314,714. On 16 May the Tribunal said that Barletta had won by 1,713 votes. According to political scientist Margaret Scranton, the process "looked suspicious" as "the announcement came ten days after the election, and one of the three members of the Tribunal abstained".

=== President ===
Candidate	Party or alliance		Votes	%
Nicolás Ardito Barletta	National Democratic Union	Democratic Revolutionary Party	175,722	27.45
Nicolás Ardito Barletta	National Democratic Union	Labor and Agrarian Party	45,384	7.09
Nicolás Ardito Barletta	National Democratic Union	Republican Party	34,215	5.34
Nicolás Ardito Barletta	National Democratic Union	Liberal Party	28,568	4.46
Nicolás Ardito Barletta	National Democratic Union	Panameñista Party	11,579	1.81
Nicolás Ardito Barletta	National Democratic Union	Broad Popular Front	5,280	0.82
Nicolás Ardito Barletta	National Democratic Union	Total	300,748	46.98
Arnulfo Arias Madrid	Democratic Opposition Alliance	Authentic Panameñista Party	221,335	34.57
Arnulfo Arias Madrid	Democratic Opposition Alliance	Christian Democratic Party	46,963	7.34
Arnulfo Arias Madrid	Democratic Opposition Alliance	Nationalist Republican Liberal Movement	30,737	4.80
Arnulfo Arias Madrid	Democratic Opposition Alliance	Total	299,035	46.71
Rubén Darío Paredes	Popular Nationalist Party		15,976	2.50
Carlos Iván Zúñiga	Popular Action Party		13,782	2.15
Carlos Del Cid	People's Party of Panama		4,598	0.72
José Renán Esquivel	Workers' Revolutionary Party		3,969	0.62
Ricardo Barría	Socialist Workers' Party		2,085	0.33
Total			640,193	100.00
Valid votes			640,193	95.40
Invalid/blank votes			30,897	4.60
Total votes			671,090	100.00
Registered voters/turnout			917,677	73.13
Source: Nohlen

=== National Assembly ===
Party or alliance		Votes	%	Seats
National Democratic Union	Democratic Revolutionary Party	153,182	25.14	34
National Democratic Union	Labor and Agrarian Party	74,430	12.21	7
National Democratic Union	Republican Party	51,103	8.39	3
National Democratic Union	Liberal Party	36,040	5.91	1
National Democratic Union	Panameñista Party	8,063	1.32	0
National Democratic Union	Broad Popular Front	7,813	1.28	0
National Democratic Union	Total	330,631	54.26	45
Democratic Opposition Alliance	Authentic Panameñista Party	124,562	20.44	13
Democratic Opposition Alliance	Christian Democratic Party	69,998	11.49	6
Democratic Opposition Alliance	Nationalist Republican Liberal Movement	50,936	8.36	3
Democratic Opposition Alliance	Total	245,496	40.29	22
Popular Nationalist Party		12,596	2.07	0
Popular Action Party		8,471	1.39	0
People's Party of Panama		7,315	1.20	0
Workers' Revolutionary Party		3,545	0.58	0
Socialist Workers Party		1,283	0.21	0
Total		609,337	100.00	67
Valid votes		609,337	96.43	
Invalid/blank votes		22,571	3.57	
Total votes		631,908	100.00	
Registered voters/turnout		917,677	68.86	
Source: Nohlen

== Aftermath ==
On 13 September 1985, a long-time opponent of Noriega, Hugo Spadafora, was murdered by Panamanian Defense Forces officers. President Barletta called for an investigation of Spadafora's death and allegations of Panamanian Defense Forces complicity. These actions, in conjunction with a power struggle between Roberto Díaz Herrera and Noriega, caused the Panamanian Defense Forces to oust this increasingly unpopular president.

Barletta resigned on 27 September 1985, and was replaced by First Vice-president Eric Arturo Delvalle who promised to return to "Torrijista principles".

"In 1987, the situation grew more critical, producing paralysis within the Panamanian Defense Forces. The crisis came to a head in June 1987 when Colonel Roberto Díaz Herrera, recently retired head of the Panamanian Defense Forces High Command, denounced the internal management of General Noriega's military organization. Díaz Herrera's act was the first public manifestation of a breach. In the face of the Panamanian Defense Forces's demonstrated weakness, the political sector began to mobilize and call for a confrontation with the military. Following the leadership of groups that appeared to have little political experience, they formed the 'Cruzada Civilista' for the purpose of overthrowing the Eric Arturo Delvalle government and convening a 'constituyente' assembly to draw up a new constitution".

"By late February 1988 the crisis further deepened as Eric Arturo Delvalle attempted to fire Noriega from the Panamanian Defense Forces. Instead, Eric Arturo Delvalle was sacked by the Panamanian Defense Forces-controlled National Assembly and Manuel Solis Palma was elected 'minister in charge of the presidency'".
