= 1999 Panamanian general election =

← 1994	2 May 1999	2004 →
- Presidential election
- Turnout: 76.17% (▲2.50pp)
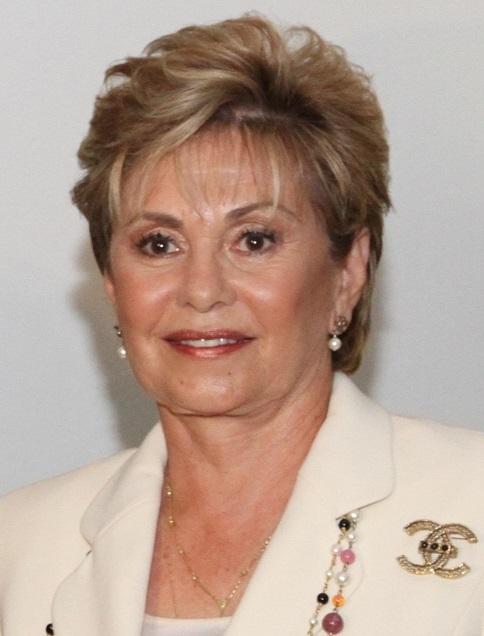

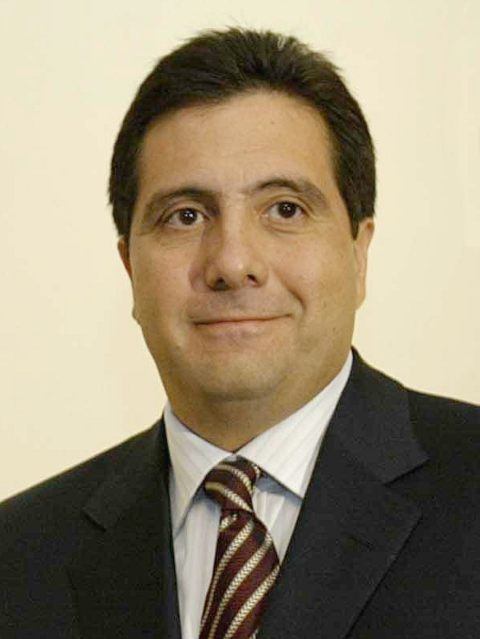

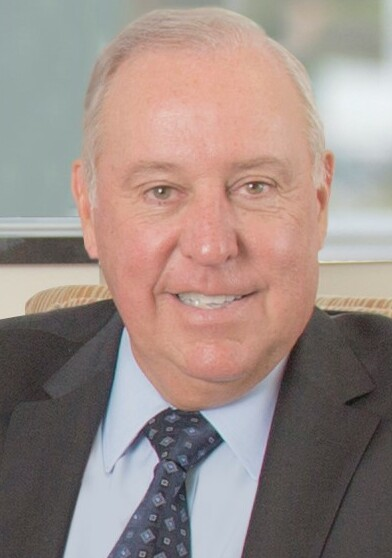
Nominee	Mireya Moscoso	Martin Torrijos	Alberto Vallarino Clement
Party	Arnulfista	PRD	OAA
Running mate	Arturo Vallarino; Dominador Bazán	Samuel Lewis Navarro; Rubén Arosemena
Popular vote	572,717	483,501	222,250
Percentage	44.80%	37.82%	17.38%
President before election
Ernesto Pérez Balladares
PRD
Elected President
Mireya Moscoso
Arnulfista

General elections were held in Panama on 2 May 1999, electing both a new President of the Republic and a new Legislative Assembly.

== Results ==
=== President ===
Candidate	Party or alliance		Votes	%
Mireya Moscoso	Union for Panama	Arnulfista Party	367,865	28.77
Mireya Moscoso	Union for Panama	Nationalist Republican Liberal Movement	140,240	10.97
Mireya Moscoso	Union for Panama	Democratic Change	36,068	2.82
Mireya Moscoso	Union for Panama	National Renewal Movement	28,544	2.23
Mireya Moscoso	Union for Panama	Total	572,717	44.80
Martín Torrijos	New Nation Alliance	Democratic Revolutionary Party	403,649	31.57
Martín Torrijos	New Nation Alliance	National Liberal Party	36,111	2.82
Martín Torrijos	New Nation Alliance	Solidarity Party	23,524	1.84
Martín Torrijos	New Nation Alliance	Mother Earth Movement	20,217	1.58
Martín Torrijos	New Nation Alliance	Total	483,501	37.82
Alberto Vallarino	Opposition Action Alliance	Christian Democratic Party	141,283	11.05
Alberto Vallarino	Opposition Action Alliance	Liberal Party	45,192	3.53
Alberto Vallarino	Opposition Action Alliance	Civic Renewal Party	25,579	2.00
Alberto Vallarino	Opposition Action Alliance	Popular Nationalist Party	10,196	0.80
Alberto Vallarino	Opposition Action Alliance	Total	222,250	17.38
Total			1,278,468	100.00
Valid votes			1,278,468	96.07
Invalid/blank votes			52,262	3.93
Total votes			1,330,730	100.00
Registered voters/turnout			1,746,989	76.17
Source: Nohlen

=== National Assembly ===
Party or alliance		Votes	%	Seats
New Nation Alliance	Democratic Revolutionary Party	393,356	31.99	34
New Nation Alliance	National Liberal Party	75,866	6.17	3
New Nation Alliance	Solidarity Party	71,860	5.84	4
New Nation Alliance	Mother Earth Movement	21,841	1.78	0
New Nation Alliance	Total	562,923	45.79	41
Union for Panama	Arnulfista Party	266,030	21.64	18
Union for Panama	Nationalist Republican Liberal Movement	92,711	7.54	3
Union for Panama	Democratic Change	66,841	5.44	2
Union for Panama	National Renewal Movement	42,996	3.50	1
Union for Panama	Total	468,578	38.11	24
Opposition Action Alliance	Christian Democratic Party	107,179	8.72	5
Opposition Action Alliance	Liberal Party	41,588	3.38	0
Opposition Action Alliance	Civic Renewal Party	37,705	3.07	1
Opposition Action Alliance	Popular Nationalist Party	11,506	0.94	0
Opposition Action Alliance	Total	197,978	16.10	6
Total		1,229,479	100.00	71
Valid votes		1,229,479	94.11	
Invalid/blank votes		76,911	5.89	
Total votes		1,306,390	100.00	
Registered voters/turnout		1,746,989	74.78	
Source: Nohlen
