= 1980 Panamanian parliamentary election =

Parliamentary elections were held in Panama on 28 September 1980, electing a new National Legislative Council.

The new push for democracy began with the agreement to open a legislative assembly in 1980. Two-thirds of the assembly would be chosen by the National Assembly of Municipal Representatives from among its members; the other third would be chosen by direct popular vote.

Parties were reactivated, in no small part because Omar Torrijos planned to create a new party to represent the military, its interests and constituencies. This party, the Democratic Revolutionary Party (PRD), was the first one to garner the 30,000 signatures required to be legally registered. According to Jan Knippers and Edmundo Flores, "Wide speculation held that the PRD would nominate Omar Torrijos as its candidate for the presidential race planned for 1984. Moreover, many assumed that with government backing, the PRD would have a substantial advantage in the electoral process".

The National Opposition Front (FRENO), a coalition of eight parties formed in March 1979, was the major source of opposition to the PRD in early 1980. The parties within FRENO are both to the left and the right of center in the political spectrum. FRENO often suffered from internal divisions, caused especially by varying attitudes toward participation in the electoral process. FRENO leaders termed the government a "dictatorship lacking respect for human rights." They also were opposed to the new Panama Canal treaties and called for their revision on terms more favorable to Panama.

The most powerful party within FRENO was the Panameñista Party (PP), led by the aged Arnulfo Arias – a leading member of the oligarchy – who had been president on three occasions and was overthrown by members of the armed forces each time. The National Liberal Party (PLN) vied with the PP as the largest party within FRENO. Until mid-1979 the PLN was led by David Samudio, a centrist politician who was Arias' main opponent in the 1968 elections). In the late 1970s, however, Samudio became ostracized both within FRENO and his own party because of his tactical support of the electoral process as dictated by the government. Under Samudio, the PLN had been the only party to support strongly the New Panama Canal treaties. After Samudio was ousted by his own party members, Arnulfo Escalona became the party president. The Christian Democratic Party (PDC) was one of the few parties within FRENO. Its leader, Ricardo Arias Calderon, was the main promoter of the formation of a united opposition against the PRD. The Panamanian Social Democratic Party (PDS), led by Winston Robles, was another left-of-center, reform-oriented component of FRENO. Smaller parties within FRENO included the Republican Party, the Third Nationalist Party, the Independent Democratic Movement, and the Labor and Agrarian Party. FRENO is open to the inclusion of more parties in the coalition, but when the God and Panama Movement of Juan Carlos Voloj Pereira applied for membership in October 1979, it was rejected by the leftist groups within FRENO as being "fascist and antidemocratic" and not appropriate to a moderate opposition movement. The Broad Popular Front (FRAMPO) is one of only two significant political parties outside the FRENO coalition. FRAMPO generally supports the government from a position slightly to the left of the PRD. The other significant party outside FRENO is the People’s Party of Panama (PPP), the communist party. Although small in membership, for several years during the 1970s the Moscow-line party acted as the principal source of organized political support for the Omar Torrijos government. Finally, a handful of minuscule parties were organized but had little chance of being able to compete in elections. These tended to be either on the extreme left, such as the Trotskyite Fraction movement (a splinter from the PPP), or on the extreme right.

All qualified parties competed in the 1980 legislative elections, but these elections posed no threat to Torrijos’s power base because political parties vied for only 18 of the 57 seats in the legislature. The other two-thirds of the representatives were appointed, in essence by Torrijos’s supporters.

In the September elections, the PRD won 40.4% of the vote and 11 of the 19 seats; the PLN – divided on whether it should run or not – won 5 seats; the PDC won 20.7% and 2 seats. The remaining seat was won by an independent candidate running with the support of the PPP. The FRAMPO failed to win a single seat. On the other hand, some 40% of the potential 800,000 voters abstained, many of whom were affiliated with parties in FRENO.

== Results ==
Party	Votes	%	Seats
Democratic Revolutionary Party		40.4	11
National Liberal Party			5
Christian Democratic Party	155,453	20.7	2
Broad Popular Front			0
Socialist Workers Party			0
Workers' Revolutionary Party			0
Independents (including PPP)			1
Appointed members			38
Total			57
Total votes	556,969	–	
Registered voters/turnout	834,409	66.75	
Source: Pearson
