= I. Roberto Eisenmann Jr. =

Panamanian journalist (born 1937)

Ithiel Roberto Eisenmann Field
- Born: Ithiel Roberto Eisenmann Field; 1937 (age 88–89); Panama City
- Occupation: Journalist
- Known for: Founder of La Prensa

Ithiel Roberto Eisenmann Field Jr. (born in Panama City in 1937) is a Panamanian journalist known for founding and heading La Prensa, a leading daily newspaper described as Panama's newspaper of record.

== La Prensa under military rule ==
After several years in exile in the U.S., Eisenmann returned to Panama in 1979.

In 1980, he founded La Prensa to oppose the military dictatorship of Omar Torrijos, and the paper published its first issue on August 4, 1980.

The paper soon ran into strong, and occasionally violent, opposition. In 1982, Prensa editor Carlos Ernesto González was sentenced to five months' imprisonment for an article critical of President Aristedes Royo, in which he accused the president of being behind the gunshots fired at the Prensa building by Revolutionary Democratic Party (PRD) supporters.

In 1986, La Prensa was the only newspaper to publish reports critical of military leader Manuel Noriega; the government consequently adopted a formal resolution condemning Eisenmann as a "traitor to the nation". Eisenmann then reportedly lived in exile in the U.S. for fear of his safety, first in Massachusetts as a Nieman Fellow of Harvard University, and then in Miami, Florida.

On July 2, 1987, PRD supporters burned down Mansion Dante, a commercial complex owned by the Eisenmann family.

On July 26, security forces entered the building with an order to close La Prensa signed by Governor of Panama Alberto Velázquez; two smaller opposition papers were also closed. La Prensa remained closed for six months, putting out its next issue on January 20, 1988.

The paper was occupied and closed by government troops again in 1988, remaining closed until after the December 1989 United States invasion of Panama. During the invasion, the U.S. Army stated that it found documents from opponents of the regime—ranging from Eisenmann to U.S. presidents Ronald Reagan and George H. W. Bush—being used in apparent Santería rituals against them. The paper reopened in January 1990. Eisenmann called the issue "the first La Prensa that we have ever published without threat, without being under the gun".

== Under civilian rule ==
Following democratic reforms, La Prensa continued to report on politics and government corruption. In the 1994 presidential election, the paper opposed Democratic Revolutionary Party (PRD) candidate Ernesto Pérez Balladares—the election's eventual winner—stating in editorials that he was a threat to the country's post-dictatorship democracy.

Peruvian journalist Gustavo Gorriti joined the investigative staff, and after a series of articles reporting on the connections between drug traffickers and the PRD, had his work visa rejected by the Panamanian government and was charged with defamation by Attorney General José Antonio Sossa for an article about Sossa himself.

In 1999, Eisenmann served as an informal advisor to the administration of President Mireya Moscoso of the Arnulfista Party.

In March 2001, Pérez Balladares' former foreign minister, Ricardo Alberto Arias, forced out Gorriti and was elected La Prensa's new president by a majority of shareholders. The Committee to Protect Journalists, which had awarded Gorriti its International Press Freedom Award for his work with the paper, called the election, and the resignations and demotions of investigative staff that followed, a "boardroom coup" that left "the once feisty paper a shadow of its former self".

Eisenmann went on to work for a non-governmental organization.

In 2004, former Attorney General Sossa filed a criminal complaint for defamation against Eisenmann after he accused Sossa in a Prensa column of "protecting criminals and filing charges against journalists". Eisenmann was barred from leaving the country, and after refusing to answer questions on the case in court, was declared in contempt.

== Awards ==
In 1995, Eisenmann was awarded a special citation of the Maria Moors Cabot Prize for "promoting press freedom and inter-American understanding".

On July 4, 2014, the Inter American Press Association (SIP) established between its annual awards for journalistic excellence Environmental Journalism category, under the name I. Roberto Eisenmann, in recognition of the history of the founder of La Prensa as a promoter of democratic and civic values that postulates the organization, composed of over 300 Media in the Americas. The decision was taken unanimously by the full Executive Committee of the SIP, as part of its mid-year meeting, held in Barbados.
