= Economic history of Panama =

This article describes the economic history of Panama.

== Early history ==
Since the early 16th century, Panama's geographic location has given the country a comparative advantage. From the earliest Spanish times, gold and silver from Peru would be transported to Spain via the Panama isthmus. Ports on each coast and a trail between them handled much of Spain's colonial trade, to the benefit of the inhabitants of the port cities. The country has always been dependent on world commerce for its prosperity and imports. Agriculture received little attention until the 20th century, and by the 1980s had for most of the population barely developed beyond indigenous Indian techniques. Industry developed slowly because the flow of goods from Europe and later from North America created a disincentive for local production.

Panama has been affected by the cyclical nature of international trade. The economy stagnated in the 18th century as colonial trade via the isthmus declined. In the mid-19th century, Panama's economy boomed as a result of increased cargo and passengers associated with the California Gold Rush. A railroad across the isthmus, completed in 1855, extended economic growth for about fifteen years until completion of the first transcontinental railroad in the United States led to a decline in trans-isthmian traffic.

France's efforts to construct a canal across the isthmus in the 1880s and efforts by the United States in the early 20th century stimulated the Panamanian economy. In 1903 Panama separated from Colombia, and the United States took control of the Panama Canal Zone; and soon afterwards a constitutional ruling adopted the US dollar as legal tender for the country.

The United States completed the canal in 1914, and canal traffic expanded by an average of 15% a year between 1915 and 1930. The stimulus was strongly felt in Panama City and Colón, the terminal cities of the canal.

However, the world depression of the 1930s reduced international trade and canal traffic, causing widespread unemployment in the terminal cities and generating a flow of workers to subsistence farming. During World War II, canal traffic did not increase, but the economy boomed as the convoy system and the presence of United States forces, sent to defend the canal, increased foreign spending in the canal cities. The end of the war was followed by an economic depression and another movement of unemployed people into agriculture. The government initiated a modest public works program, instituted price support for major crops, and increased protection for selected agricultural and industrial products.

The postwar depression gave way to rapid economic expansion between 1950 and 1970, when GDP increased by an average of 6.4% a year, one of the highest sustained growth rates in the world. All sectors contributed to the growth. Agricultural output rose, boosted by greater fishing activities (especially shrimp), the development of high-value fruit and vegetable production, and the rapid growth of banana exports after disease-resistant trees were planted. Commerce evolved into a relatively sophisticated wholesale and retail system. Banking, tourism, and the export of services to the Canal Zone grew rapidly. Most importantly, an increase in world trade provided a major stimulus to use of the canal and to the economy.

== 1970s-present ==
In the 1970s and 1980s, Panama's growth fluctuated with the vagaries of the world economy. After 1973, economic expansion slowed considerably as a result of a number of international and domestic factors. Real GDP growth averaged 3.5% a year between 1973 and 1979. In the early 1980s, the economy rebounded with GDP growth rates of 15.4% in 1980, 4.2% in 1981, and 5.6% in 1982. The acute recession in Latin America after 1982, however, wreaked havoc on Panama's economy. GDP growth in 1983 was a mere 0.4%, but -0.4% in 1984.

This period coincided with the rise to power of General Manuel Noriega, during which Panama became increasingly indebted. By 1986 the country owed SDR284m (US$360m) to the IMF alone, 278% of its quota. This led to the IMF imposing an adjustment program supported by an IMF stand-by arrangement in 1985–87 whilst the economy recovered somewhat. In 1985 Panama experienced economic recovery with 4.1% GDP growth. The corresponding figure for 1986 was estimated to be 2.8%.

The United States started to pursue Noriega for fostering a narco-state in Panama, culminating in sanctions that froze Panama's assets in the United States, and because Panama used the US dollar it was forced to default on its IMF debt on 28 December 1987. Economic turmoil in the country included a general strike and the banking system closing down for two months. Panama made a token payment the day before the IMF meeting in November 1988, but the situation did not resolve until 1989. Presidential elections in May 1989 were condemned by the international community as fraudulent and the IMF began to become impatient with Panama's increasing arrears which had now reached SDR121m (US$150m).

The United States and Germany forced through a resolution on 30 June 1989 declaring Panama ineligible for further support from the IMF. The United States invaded Panama in December 1989 and forced the surrender of Noriega. SDR181.5m (~$US230m) was still owed to the IMF in April 1990, but the country regained access to IMF funds on 2 May 1992.

After taking office in 1994, President Ernesto Perez Balladares instituted an economic liberalization program designed to liberalize the trade regime, attract foreign investment, privatize state-owned enterprises, institute fiscal discipline and privatize its two ports in 1997 and approve the sale of the railroad in early assets. Panama joined the World Trade Organization (WTO) and a banking reform law was approved by the legislature in early 1998 and dismantled the central bank. After two years of near stagnation the reforms began to take root, with GDP growing by 3.6% in 1997 and more than 6% in 1998. The most important sectors which drove growth were the Panama Canal and the shipping and port activities of the Colón Free Trade Zone which also rebounded from a slow year in 1996.

On 1 September 1999, Mireya Moscoso, the widow of former President Arnulfo Arias Madrid, took office. During her administration, Moscoso attempted to strengthen social programs, especially for child and youth development, protection, and general welfare. Moscoso's administration successfully handled the Panama Canal transfer and was effective in the administration of the Canal.

The PRD's Martin Torrijos won the presidency and a legislative majority in the National Assembly in 2004. Under Torrijos, Panama continued strong economic growth and initiated the Panama Canal expansion project that began in 2007 and was opened to commercial traffic on 26 June 2016, at a cost of US$5.25 billion – about 25% of current GDP. The canal expansion doubled the waterway's capacity, enabling it to accommodate Post-Panamax ships that were too large to transverse the transoceanic crossway, and expected to help reduce the high unemployment rate. Strong economic performance had reduced the national poverty level to 29% in 2008.

In 2008, Panama had the second most unequal income distribution in Latin America. The Torrijos government implemented tax reforms, as well as social security reforms, and backed regional trade agreements and development of tourism. Not a CAFTA signatory, Panama in December 2006 independently negotiated a free trade agreement with the US, which, when implemented,

should help promote the country's economic growth.

In May 2009, Ricardo Martinelli was elected president, and promised to promote free trade, establish a metro system at an approximate cost of $1.0 billion, reform the health care system, and complete the expansion plan for the Panama Canal. Martinelli also emphasized the importance of transforming Panama into a “safer, modern and supportive” nation devoted to improving the living conditions of its population through efficient and accountable governance.
