= El Siglo (Panama) =

- Type: Daily newspaper
- Format: Tabloid
- Editor-in-chief: Juan Luis Correa
- Editor: Eduardo Antonio Quirós
- News editor: Magaly Montilla and Eliezer Navarro
- Opinion editor: Avenabet Mercado
- Photo editor: Didier Magallón
- Founded: 16 January 1985
- Language: Spanish
- Headquarters: Calle Alejandro A. Duque G., 0815-00507, Zona 4, Panama
- Website: elsiglo.com.pa (in Spanish)

El Siglo ("The Century") is a Spanish language daily newspaper published in Panama. It was founded on 9 January 1985 and as of 2010 had the largest circulation of any Panamanian newspaper.

In 1990, after the fall of military ruler Manuel Noriega in the United States invasion of Panama, the paper offered a prize for the best essays that "explain and detail the criminal acts of the deposed tyrant (Noriega) and his followers."

On December 10, 1998, Siglo reporter Carlos Singares was sentenced to 20 months' imprisonment for defamation for a 1993 article he had written about former president Ernesto Pérez Balladares, accusing him of helping to move money out of Panama for former military ruler Omar Torrijos.

In May 2000, Attorney General José Antonio Sossa attempted to jail Singares for alleging that he had pressured journalists, but reversed himself after criticism by President Mireya Moscoso; the following month, Sossa did jail Singares for eight days without trial for reporting in an article that Sossa had visited underage prostitutes.
