= 1994 Panamanian general election =

- 8 May 1994
- Presidential election
- Turnout: 73.67% (▲13.19pp)
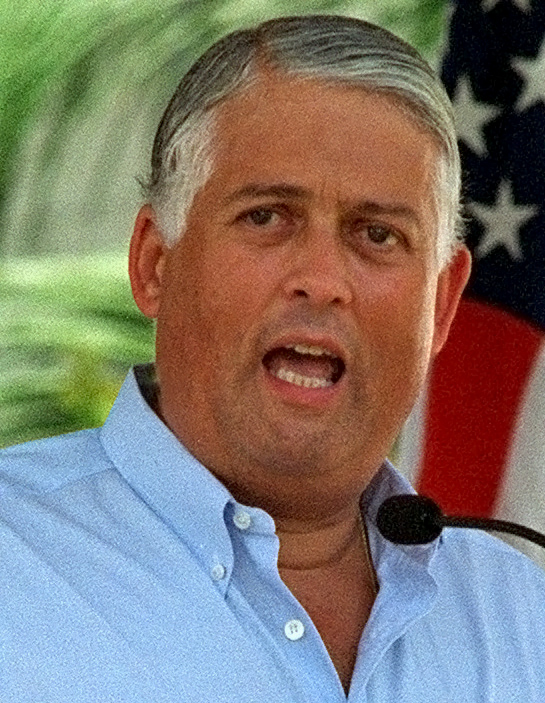

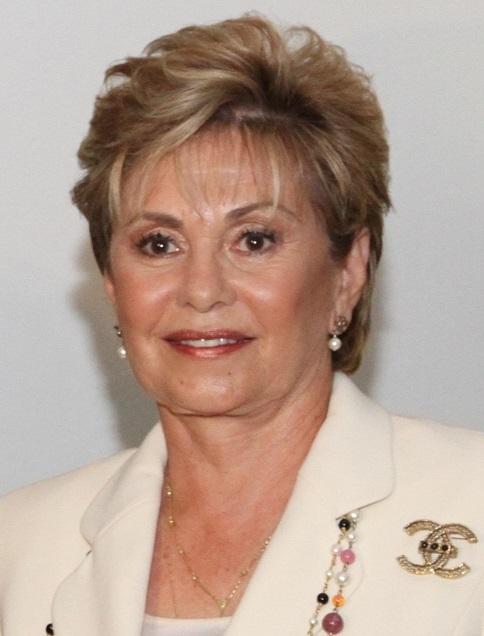

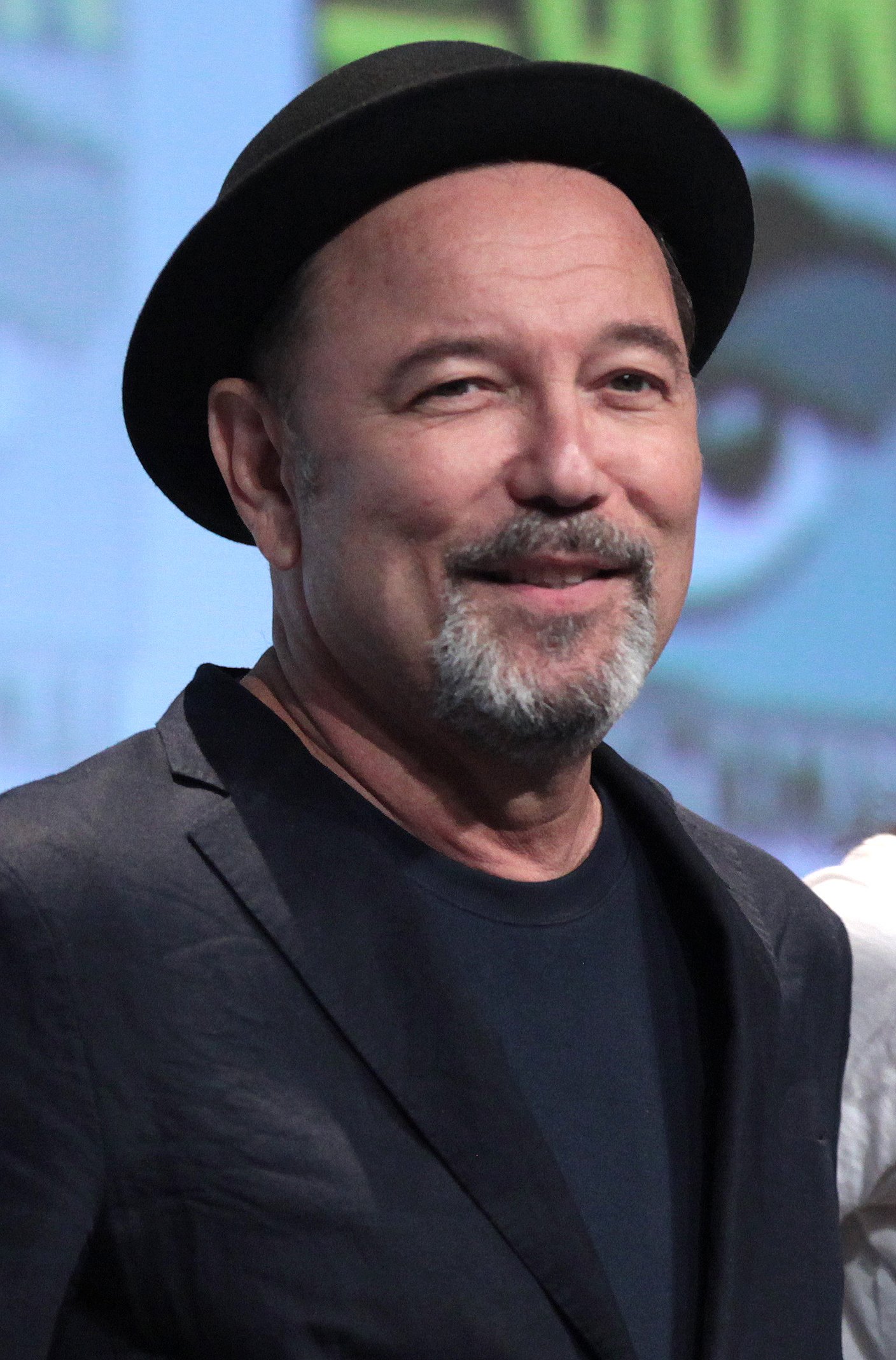
Nominee	Ernesto Pérez Balladares	Mireya Moscoso
Party	PRD	Arnulfista
Running mate	Tomas Altamirano Duque	Dominador Baldomero Bazán
Popular vote	355,307	310,372
Percentage	33.30%	29.09%
Nominee	Rubén Blades	Rubén Darío Carles
Party	MPE	MOLIRENA
Running mate	Fernando Manfredo	Guillermo Quijano
Popular vote	182,405	171,192
Percentage	17.10%	16.05%
President before election
Guillermo Endara
Panameñista
Elected President
Ernesto Pérez Balladares
PRD

General elections were held in Panama on 8 May 1994, electing both a new President of the Republic and a new Legislative Assembly.

Ernesto Pérez Balladares stood as a candidate for the Democratic Revolutionary Party (PRD), opposing Mireya Moscoso of the Arnulfista Party and the salsa singer Rubén Blades, who was then president of the party Papa Egoro. In the 1989 general election, Pérez Balladares had served as the campaign manager for Carlos Duque, the hand-picked candidate of military ruler Manuel Noriega, and his 1994 opponents sought to emphasize his connection with Noriega, broadcasting pictures of the two together. Pérez Balladares denied the link, describing the current PRD as "diametrically opposed" to Noriega's policies. Instead, he worked to position himself as a successor to Torrijos, who was regarded as a national hero. The incumbent Arnulfista Party, meanwhile, was seen as hobbled by dissatisfaction with the perceived incompetence and corruption of Endara's government. He ultimately won the election with 33% of the vote, with Moscoso receiving 29% and Blades receiving 17%.

The PRD "also achieved an effective majority in the new National Assembly. The big surprise was not the victory of the PRD, but the nearly successful challenge of Mireya Moscoso de Gruber, the candidate of the Arnulfista Party".

== Results ==
=== President ===
Candidate	Party or alliance		Votes	%
Ernesto Pérez Balladares	United People Alliance	Democratic Revolutionary Party	326,095	30.57
Ernesto Pérez Balladares	United People Alliance	Labor and Agrarian Party	17,046	1.60
Ernesto Pérez Balladares	United People Alliance	Republican Liberal Party	12,166	1.14
Ernesto Pérez Balladares	United People Alliance	Total	355,307	33.30
Mireya Moscoso	Democratic Alliance	Arnulfista Party	211,780	19.85
Mireya Moscoso	Democratic Alliance	Liberal Party	46,775	4.38
Mireya Moscoso	Democratic Alliance	Authentic Liberal Party	43,797	4.11
Mireya Moscoso	Democratic Alliance	Independent Democrat Union	8,020	0.75
Mireya Moscoso	Democratic Alliance	Total	310,372	29.09
Rubén Blades	Mother Earth Movement		182,405	17.10
Rubén Dario Carles	Alliance for Change '94	Nationalist Republican Liberal Movement	115,478	10.82
Rubén Dario Carles	Alliance for Change '94	National Renewal Movement	32,122	3.01
Rubén Dario Carles	Alliance for Change '94	Civic Renewal Party	23,592	2.21
Rubén Dario Carles	Alliance for Change '94	Total	171,192	16.05
Eduardo Vallarino	Christian Democratic Party		25,476	2.39
Samuel Lewis Galindo	National Concertation	Solidarity Party	9,304	0.87
Samuel Lewis Galindo	National Concertation	National Unity Mission Party	9,120	0.85
Samuel Lewis Galindo	National Concertation	Total	18,424	1.73
José Salvador Muñoz	Doctrinaire Panameñista Party		3,668	0.34
Total			1,066,844	100.00
Valid votes			1,066,844	96.58
Invalid/blank votes			37,734	3.42
Total votes			1,104,578	100.00
Registered voters/turnout			1,499,451	73.67
Source: Nohlen

=== National Assembly ===
Party or alliance		Votes	%	Seats
United People Alliance	Democratic Revolutionary Party	236,319	22.86	30
United People Alliance	Labor and Agrarian Party	28,172	2.73	1
United People Alliance	Republican Liberal Party	24,979	2.42	2
United People Alliance	Total	289,470	28.01	33
Democratic Alliance	Arnulfista Party	150,217	14.53	14
Democratic Alliance	Liberal Party	35,516	3.44	2
Democratic Alliance	Authentic Liberal Party	31,045	3.00	2
Democratic Alliance	Independent Democrat Union	13,106	1.27	1
Democratic Alliance	Total	229,884	22.24	19
Alliance for Change '94	Nationalist Republican Liberal Movement	116,833	11.30	5
Alliance for Change '94	National Renewal Movement	68,581	6.64	1
Alliance for Change '94	Civic Renewal Party	57,590	5.57	3
Alliance for Change '94	Total	243,004	23.51	9
Mother Earth Movement		99,760	9.65	6
National Concertation	Solidarity Party	67,306	6.51	4
National Concertation	National Unity Mission Party	27,017	2.61	0
National Concertation	Total	94,323	9.13	4
Christian Democratic Party		66,411	6.43	1
Doctrinaire Panameñista Party		10,720	1.04	0
Total		1,033,572	100.00	72
Valid votes		1,033,572	94.67	
Invalid/blank votes		58,184	5.33	
Total votes		1,091,756	100.00	
Registered voters/turnout		1,499,451	72.81	
Source: Nohlen
