= 1978 Panamanian parliamentary election =

Parliamentary elections were held in Panama on 6 August 1978, electing a new National Assembly of Community Representatives.

On 6 August 1978 the first of several steps was taken under the Constitution of 1972 which was to lead ultimately to the restoration of power to elected officials.

The unicameral Parliament of Panama, the National Assembly of Community Representatives (‘corregidores’), comprised 505 members elected for 6 years.

The first three political parties to emerge in the period March-June 1978 were the Democratic Revolutionary Party (PRD) led by Omar Torrijos, the National Liberal Party led by David Samudio and the pro-Torrijos Broad Popular Front (FRAMPO). However, all candidates ran as independents.

Omar Torrijos "formed the Democratic Revolutionary Party (PRD) to incorporate the various groups that supported his military regime as the country moved toward a democratic opening. Formation of the PRD suggested that the military wished to give permanent institutional form to its reformist ideals through the establishment of a new political party that would regularly win elections with military backing".

“In the 1978 Assembly elections, some 1,927 independent candidates vied for the 505 seats, political parties having been abolished in February 1969. Polling day was marked by a high turnout, estimated at 80%. Pro-Government candidates were reported to have won a clear majority”.

The event proved to be a demonstration of the weakness of the government’s popular support. Candidates of the PRD secured only 40% of the vote, achieving a majority only in coalition with the People’s Party of Panama (PPP) and the FRAMPO. While the government faced no national electoral test for six more years, it seems likely that its popularity was in decline in the late 1970s and early 1980s. Under pressure of economic difficulties, the government began a retreat from its populism even before Omar Torrijos died in an air crash in 1981.

Arnulfo Arias’s Panameñista Party (PP) boycotted the campaign after an abortive attempt to form a united opposition front.

== Results ==
Party	Votes	%	Seats
Independents	633,601	100.00	505
Total	633,601	100.00	505
Valid votes	633,601	96.23	
Invalid/blank votes	24,820	3.77	
Total votes	658,421	100.00	
Registered voters/turnout	787,251	83.64	
Source: Nohlen
