= Delvalle =

Delvalle is a surname. Notable people with the surname include:

- Alcibiades González Delvalle (born 1936), Paraguayan journalist, playwright, essayist, and novelist
- Casiano Delvalle (born 1970), Paraguayan footballer
- Eric Arturo Delvalle (1937–2015), Panamanian politician
- Max Delvalle (1911–1979), Panamanian politician
