= Miren Gutiérrez Almazor =

Spanish journalist, activist, scholar, and university lecturer (born 1966)

- Born: 1966 (age 59–60); Pamplona, Spain
- Education: University of Navarra; University of Deusto (PhD)
- Occupation: Journalist

Miren Gutiérrez Almazor (born in Pamplona in 1966) is a Spanish journalist, activist, scholar, and university lecturer. Her research focus has to do with data activism or how people and organizations use data infrastructure, in combination with other technologies, for social change, environmental conservation, and equality.

== Biography ==
Graduated in Hispanic Philology, specialized in Linguistics, from the University of Navarra, Ph.D. in communication from the University of Deusto. She began her career in 1990, in Hong Kong, as a correspondent for the EFE, leading a network of contributors covering Southeast Asia, the Korea peninsula, and the Pacific for the leading Spanish-speaking international news agency. At the end of 1996, she was appointed Editor of the Business section of the Panama newspaper La Prensa, where she wrote and coordinated numerous investigative stories into corruption and irregularities, some with significant environmental and legal consequences.

Due to these investigations and the attacks she suffered in her profession's exercise, in 2000, the Committee for the Protection of Journalists included her in its report "Attacks against the press". Former Attorney General José Antonio Sossa filed a criminal complaint for libel against four Prensa journalists in 2000, including business editor Miren Gutierrez, and journalists Monica Palm and Rolando Rodriguez. The complaint cited a series of stories the paper published in 1999 reporting that a drug trafficker had donated to one of Sossa's political campaigns. In 2004, Sossa also filed a complaint against Eisenmann, who had questioned his work as a public servant. Set in the investigation on the demise of celebrity money-launderer Marc Harris, she wrote a novel titled “La ciudad de las cigarras.”

In 1997, her report "From Uncle Sam to Uncle Chang", in collaboration with Gustavo Gorriti, won the Journalists Forum Award for Freedom of Expression and Information

In 2003, she was appointed editorial director of Inter Press Service (IPS), an international news agency specializing in the environment, human rights, civil society, and development, where she coordinated 420 collaborators in 330 locations around the world.

She has also written for El Mundo, El País, The Nation, Wall Street Journal Americas, UPI, Climate and Development Knowledge Network (CDKN), and Transparency International, among other organizations. She currently writes a column focused on data activism, the environment, and human rights for eldiario.es.

In 2010, she was elected executive director of Green Peace Spain, a position she holds until 2011. She then became the editorial director of Index on Censorship. And in 2012, she started working for the Overseas Development Institute (ODI) of the United Kingdom to become a Research Associate working on big data projects focused on illegal fishing, including one on China's distant water fishing fleet.

She is a lecturer in the Communication Studies and International Relations programs at the University of Deusto, the Ph.D. in Leisure, Culture and Communication for Human Development Program, and Director of the Postgraduate Program “Data Analysis, Research and Communication” at said university. She has been a guest professor at the University of Tilburg, University of Navarra, University of Amsterdam, University of Rome (Sapienza), and the University of Maastricht. She is also a research associate at DATACTVIVE, University of Amsterdam, from 2016, and at MediaData, Polytechnic University of Valencia.

In 2018 she published Data Activism and Social Change, a book recognized by Book Authority as one of the 10 best books published in the field of social activism. In 2020, she published Activismo de datos y cambio social. Alianzas, mapas, plataformas y acción para un mundo mejor, expanding the exploration of data activism and focusing on cases from the Spanish-speaking world. She is among the first scholars to start examining data activism as a new theory and practice centered in the data infrastructure.

She has been interviewed and featured in numerous articles, including at The Guardian, El País, Reuters, EFE, Seafood Source, SciDevNet, Voice of America, Mondiaal Nieuws, Xataka, Big Data & Society, China Dialogue.

== Publications ==
- Gutierrez, Miren; Jobbins, Guy (2020-06-02). "China's distant-water fishing fleet: scale, impact and governance". ODI.
- Watkins, Kevin; Gutierrez, Miren; Matheson, Ishbel (2016-06-29). "Western Africa's missing fish: the impacts of illegal, unreported and unregulated fishing and under-reporting catches by foreign fleets". ODI.
- Gutierrez, Miren; McFarland, Will (2014-03-24). "Zero poverty… think again: the impact of climate change on development efforts". ODI.
- Gutierrez, Miren (2016-12-01). "The Good, the Bad and the Ugly: Who is Who in the Fight Against Climate Change". Development. 59 (3): 195–198. doi:10.1057/s41301-017-0093-x. ISSN 1461-7072. S2CID 90191088.
- Milan, Stefania; Gutierrez, Miren (2018). "Technopolitics in the Age of Big Data". In Caballero, Francisco Sierra; Gravante, Tommaso (eds.). Networks, Movements and Technopolitics in Latin America. Springer International Publishing. pp. 95–109. doi:10.1007/978-3-319-65560-4. ISBN 978-3-319-65559-8.
- Gutierrez, Miren (2019). "The Good, the Bad and the Beauty of 'Good Enough Data'". In Daly, Angela; Devitt, S. Kate; Mann, Monique (eds.). Good Data. Theory on Demand #29. Amsterdam: Institute of Network Cultures. ISBN 978-94-92302-27-4.
