= Frente Amplio =

Frente Amplio (transl. Broad Front) may refer to:

- Frente Amplio (Chile, political party), a political party in Chile
- Frente Amplio (Chile, political coalition), a former political coalition in Chile
- Broad Front (Costa Rica), a political party in Costa Rica
- Broad Front (Dominican Republic), a political coalition in the Dominican Republic
- Broad Front (Peru), a political coalition in Peru
- Broad Front (Spain), a left-wing political coalition in Spain
- Broad Front (Uruguay), a left-wing political coalition in Spain
- Broad Progressive Front (Argentina), a political coalition in Argentina (2011–2013)
- Broad Front UNEN, a political coalition in Argentina (2013–2015)
- Broad Progressive Front, a political coalition in Mexico
- Broad Popular Front, a political party in Panama
- Broad Front for Democracy, a former political party in Panama
