= Republican Liberal Party (Panama) =

Former political party in Panama

The Republican Liberal Party (Spanish: Partido Liberal Republicano, PLR) was a political party in Panama.

== History ==
The party was part of the United People Alliance for the 1994 general elections, in which the Alliance's presidential candidate Ernesto Pérez Balladares was elected president. The PLR also won two seats in the National Assembly.
