= Tomás Altamirano Mantovani =

Panamanian politician

Tomás Altamirano Mantovani (c. 1960 – February 28, 2009) was a Panamanian politician and National Assembly deputy.

== Background and public life ==
He was considered a prominent member of Panama's ruling political party, the Democratic Revolutionary Party.

Altamirano was the son of former Panamanian Vice President Tomas Altamirano Duque. He served as the head of the National Assembly of Panama's Canal Affairs Commission.

== Death ==
Tomás Altamirano was killed on February 28, 2009, when a vehicle in which he was a passenger overturned on a Panamanian highway. He was 49 years old. Altamirano's bodyguard and another passenger were hospitalized in the accident.

Panamanian President Martin Torrijos, and Foreign Minister Samuel Lewis Navarro were flown to the scene of the accident by helicopter. Torrijos was described as "visibly upset."
