= Fernando Berguido =

Panamanian newspaper executive

Fernando Berguido was born in Panama City, Panama in 1962. He earned his Bachelor of Laws Degree, cum laude, from Universidad Santa Maria La Antigua School of Law in Panama City, Panama in 1986. Then as a Fulbright Scholar he received his Master of Laws at the University of California, Los Angeles School of Law (UCLA) in 1988. He is a Neiman Fellow of Harvard University.

He practiced law in Panama City and lectured Constitutional Law at Universidad Santa Maria La Antigua School of Law. He is the author of “La sucesión presidencial en Panamá (1987)”.

Between 2000 and 2005 he served as president of Transparency International’s Panamanian Chapter. During his tenure, Berguido wrote the draft and was instrumental in the enactment of Panama’s first ever freedom of information law, known as “Ley de Transparencia”.

In 2001 he was appointed by Executive Order as Member of the Commission of Truth to investigate crimes committed during Panama’s Military Regime (1968-1989).

From 1994 to 2014 Berguido served in the board of directors of the Panamanian newspaper, La Prensa. In 2004 he was elected as chairman of the board of directors of Corporacion La Prensa and publisher of La Prensa. He has served from 2005-2007, and again since 2009 as Editor in Chief and head of the Investigative Unit.

He is a member of the board of directors of Instituto Latinoamericano de Estudios Avanzados (Ildea); Fundación para el Desarrollo de la Libertad Ciudadana, and of Centro Latinoamericano de Periodismo(Celap).

In 2010 the Nieman Foundation for Journalism at Harvard University announced the selection of Berguido as Nieman Fellow for the 2011 class.[4]

In 2013 he published "Una vida postuma", an autobiographical account that reached three editions within the first year.

Berguido served as Panamanian Ambassador to Italy from 2014 to 2017. He was responsible for solving the “Finmeccanica Affairs”, an intricate network of corruption that incriminates the governments of Silvio Berlusconi and Ricardo Martinelli for the purchase of US$250 million in helicopters and radars by Panama to the Italian conglomerate Finmeccanica.

Penguin Random House published in 2017 his book “Anatomia de una trampa” (Anatomy of a Scam), a true story that recounts the dealings of a former journalist turned diplomat, joining forces with Italian prosecutors, in order to expose the bribes behind the Finmeccanica deal, annul the contracts and recover millions of dollars of public funds to his country.

The Government of Panama decorated him in 2019 with the Great Cross of the Belisario Porras National Order for his civic duties and contributions to transparency in his country and for his role in the recuperation of stolen assets during his tenure as Ambassador to Italy.

He is a Member of the National Council of Foreign Affairs of the Republic of Panama] and of the Advisory Board of the Nieman Foundation for Journalism at Harvard.
