= José Antonio Sossa =

Panamanian politician

José Antonio Sossa is a Panamanian politician who served as Attorney General of Panama under President Mireya Moscoso.

== Clashes with journalists ==
Sossa had several conflicts with the press, particularly the opposition newspaper La Prensa. In 2000, he filed a criminal complaint for defamation against four Prensa journalists: Peruvian investigative journalist Gustavo Gorriti, business editor Miren Gutiérrez Almazor, and journalists Monica Palm and Rolando Rodriguez. The complaint cited a series of stories the paper published in 1999 reporting that a drug trafficker had donated to one of Sossa's political campaigns. In August, Sossa ordered police to the homes of the four journalists to compel them to come to court to testify.

In May, he attempted to jail El Siglo reporter Carlos Singares for alleging that he had pressured journalists, but reversed himself after criticism by President Moscoso; the following month, he did jail Singares for eight days without trial for reporting in an article that Sossa had visited underage prostitutes. In December, he barred journalists from investigating buried human remains at a military barracks, but was again overruled by Moscoso.

In 2004, Sossa filed another defamation complaint against Prensa founder I. Roberto Eisenmann, Jr. Eisenmann had criticized Sossa's service as attorney general, stating that he had been devoted to "protecting criminals and filing charges against journalists".
