= Labor and Agrarian Party =

Defunct political party in Panama

Labor and Agrarian Party (in Spanish: Partido Laborista Agrario, PALA) was a Panamanian right-of-center political party, founded in 1960.

The PALA supported the Marco Aurelio Robles administration in 1964-1968. In 1968 it allied with the People's Alliance (ADP) and its candidate David Samudio Ávila.

The PALA survived the period of suspension under Omar Torrijos (1969–1979) and re-registered on 2 May 1979. “Azael Vargas (former Minister of Agriculture, Commerce and Industry), who claimed that the Labor and Agrarian Party had been hijacked, split with it to found the Authentic Labor and Agrarian Party. He then joined with industrialist Carlos Eleta Almaran, scion of one of the "20 families', to found the National Renovation Movement (MNR), which in 1982 changed its name to the Conservative Party. An attempt to join forces with the Republican Party (PR) to form the Conservative Republican Party was frustrated by the Electoral Tribunal, and Vargas and Eleta then went on to form PALA. The party mounted an expensive publicity drive and was accused of fraudulently boosting its membership figures”.

The Electoral Tribunal registered the PALA with 35000 members. Arnulfo Arias Madrid accuse PALA of fraud in obtaining their membership.

“Despite its name, and its use of the spade as its symbol, it is extremely conservative and hostile to organized labour. With backers among Panama's wealthy elite, PALA initially supported the presidential aspirations of National Guard chief Gen. Rubén Darío Paredes in 1984.” The PALA eventually dropped him as a candidate and hacked the National Democratic Union (UNADE) and its candidate Nicolás Ardito Barletta in the 1984 election.

PALA became the second most important force within UNADE, but was weakened in 1987 by a power struggle in which Carlos Eleta Almaran was ousted as party president, apparently as part of a move by the defense forces to take greater control over the party. He was succeeded as party leader by Ramon Sieiro Murgas (General Manuel Noriega's brother-in-law).

In 1989 it allied with the National Liberation Coalition (COLINA) and its candidate Carlos Duque, PALA was expected to be allocated 1 seat in the post-US invasion legislature in 1989. It joined the United People Alliance (APU) coalition behind official candidate Ernesto Pérez Balladares in the 1994 Panamanian general election.

The PALA was abolished by the Electoral Tribunal on 15 September 1994.
