= National Renewal Movement (Panama) =

The National Renewal Movement (Movimiento de Renovación Nacional, MORENA) was a Panamanian neo-liberal political party.

The National Renewal Movement was founded on 27 December 1993 by one of the Labor and Agrarian Party factions.

For the 1994 elections, the MORENA presented its presidential candidate, Rubén Dario Carles and allied with the Nationalist Republican Liberal Movement (MOLIRENA) and Civic Renewal Party (PRC). Rubén Dario Carles polled 171,192 votes (16.05%) and came fourth (the MORENA – 32,122 and 03.01%). The MORENA won 1 legislative seat.

In 1999 MORENA allied with the Union for Panama (UPP) and its candidate Mireya Moscoso and polled only 28,487 votes (02.24%).

The MORENA was dissolved by the Electoral Tribunal, as it did not meet the legal requirements to remain active after the 1999 elections.
