= Popular Action Party (Panama) =

Popular Action Party (in Spanish: Partido de Acción Popular, PAPO) was a Panamanian political party.

Established by urban, middle-class social democrats in 1982. “In July 1982 it joined a number of other small parties, including the PDC, in branding the "deposition" of President Arístides Royo by the National Guard as "going beyond the legal and institutional frameworks set up by the National Guard itself”. The PAPO vehemently opposed the Manuel Noriega-led National Democratic Union coalition in the 1984 Panamanian general election and ran its own candidate, Carlos Iván Zúñiga, for president. In an incident that he blamed on the military, PAPO leader Zúñiga was kidnapped and beaten in August 1984. Three months later the party was legally deregistered.
