= Samuel Lewis Galindo =

Panamanian businessman (1927–2024)

- Born: Samuel Lewis Galindo; June 4, 1927; Panama
- Died: May 26, 2024 (aged 96)
- Occupations: Businessman, writer

Samuel Lewis Galindo (June 4, 1927 – May 26, 2024) was a Panamanian businessman, politician and author of essays and articles about the political, economic and social development of Panama. His published books include 900 Days: Collapse of a Dictatorship and The Strings of the Puppets: Internal Workings of a Political Campaign. In 1994, he was presidential candidate of the Republic of Panama for the Solidaridad Party, of which he was a founding member.

== Biography ==
Lewis Galindo was the son of Samuel Lewis Arango (1901–1972) and Raquel Galindo de Lewis. He attended primary and secondary school at Colegio La Salle in Panama City, and briefly studied at Soule College in the United States.

Lewis Galindo participated in several business associations, such as the Panamanian Association of Business Executives (APEDE), the Chamber of Commerce, Industries and Agriculture of Panama (CCIAP), and the Union of Industrialists of Panama. He also participated in several national councils and commissions, including the National Economic Council and the National Investment Council.

Lewis Galindo received various awards including the Order of Vasco Núñez de Balboa, Ecuador Order of Merit, and the Chamber of Commerce, Industries and Agriculture of Panama - Presidential Distinction. He was named Executive of the Year by the Panamanian Association of Business Executives in 2006.

Lewis Galindo was married to Itza Morgan Lewis, with whom he had seven children: Samuel (who died at an early age), Enrique, Mario, Adriana, Roberto, Ricardo and Itza Maria.

On August 23, 2017, the Latin University of Panama conferred the title of doctor honoris causa.

Lewis Galindo died on May 26, 2024, at the age of 96, nine days before his 97th birthday.

== Career ==
Lewis Galindo began his journalistic career in the newspaper El Pais, occupying the position of chief editor, deputy director and columnist.

His public and diplomatic life began in 1955, as special ambassador for the meeting of presidents of the American Republics. During 1956 he served as council member for Capital District, where he also was elected several times president of that body.

In 1957, he represented Panama as alternate ambassador to the United Nations General Assembly in the United States. In 1977 he was a member of the National Economic Council, while between 1984 and 1985 was president of the National Investment Council. In 1996 he participated as a member of the Foreign Affairs National Council of the Republic of Panama.

At the corporate level, he served in the 1960s as general manager and director of Industrias Panameñas, S.A. (IPSA). Lewis Galindo participated on the boards of Industrias de Carton Corrugado in Panama, Costa Rica and Guatemala. During this period, he was also member of the board of Ceverceria Nacional.

He was appointed general manager of the Cerveceria Nacional from 1970 to 1991. Between 1991 and 2001, he served as vice president of the board of the company.

During his career as general manager, he was actively involved in the brewing industry of the region and was president of the Central American Association of Brewers between 1980 and 1985.

In 1984, he founded the Banco del Istmo and served as chairman of the board until 2006. This bank, which later became Banistmo, developed into the largest Panamanian bank in Central America. He was also involved in civic and philanthropic activities as president and founder of the Panama's Heart Foundation; as well as member of the board of trustees of the Patronato Panama Viejo, which was formed to rescue the first city of Panama, established by the Spaniards in the Pacific Coast of the Continent in 1519.

In addition, he was a member of Fundacion Universidad de Panama, and served as its president in 2006 and 2007.

His published books including 900 Días: Colapso de una Dictadura, Los Hilos de las Marionetas, Pensamientos, ecritos y ensayos, El Banco del Istmo: Relato de un extraordinario éxito and Episodios de mi vida.
