= Workers' Revolutionary Party (Panama) =

Panamanian political party

Workers' Revolutionary Party (Partido Revolucionario de los Trabajadores, PRT) was a Panamanian political party.

The PRT was created in October 1983. Prior to the 1984 balloting, it joined with a number of trade union organizations in a coalition styled the United People's Electoral Front (FREPU), which neither the People’s Party of Panama or the Workers' Socialist Party chose to join. “This Trotskyist organization criticized but supported the Manuel Noriega regime and urged it to follow the nationalist policies of the Omar Torrijos government, especially the building of popular democracy. Led by Graciela Dixon the PRT encouraged the government to strengthen the role of the masses in the political process”. The PRT vehemently opposed the Manuel Noriega-led National Democratic Union coalition in 1984 and ran its own candidate, José Renán Esquivel, for president. The PNP was abolished by the Electoral Tribunal in November 1984.
