= La Prensa (Panama City) =

Panamanian newspaper

- Type: Daily newspaper
- Founder: I. Roberto Eisenmann Jr.
- Staff writers: Gustavo Gorriti (1996–2003)
- Founded: 1980; 46 years ago
- Political alignment: Conservatism; Pro-democracy
- Headquarters: Panama City, Panama
- Website: www.prensa.com

La Prensa is a conservative Panamanian newspaper founded in 1980. Established by I. Roberto Eisenmann Jr. during a period of military dictatorship, La Prensa built an international reputation as an independent nationalist voice, and has been described by some admirers as "Panama's leading opposition newspaper" and its newspaper of record.

== Under military dictatorship ==
The newspaper was founded in 1980 by I. Roberto Eisenmann Jr., who had returned to Panama in 1979 after living in exile for three years in the United States. Created to oppose the military dictatorship of Omar Torrijos, the paper published its first issue on August 4, 1981.

In 1982, Prensa editor Carlos Ernesto González was sentenced to five months' imprisonment for an article critical of President Arístides Royo, in which he accused the president of being behind an armed attack on the Prensa building by Revolutionary Democratic Party (PRD) supporters. The paper was the only media organization to endorse opposition candidate Arnulfo Arias over military leader Manuel Noriega's selection, Ardito Barletta, who was also backed and covertly funded by the United States, in the 1984 presidential election.

In 1986, La Prensa was still the only newspaper publishing reports critical of military leader Manuel Noriega, including protesting the murder of Hugo Spadafora. The government consequently adopted a formal resolution condemning Eisenmann as a "traitor to the nation". Eisenmann then reportedly lived in exile in the US for fear of his safety, first in Massachusetts as a Nieman Fellow of Harvard University, and then in Miami.

On July 4, 1987, PRD supporters burned down Mansion Dante, a commercial complex owned by the Eisenmann family. On July 26, security forces entered the building with an order to close La Prensa signed by Governor of Panama Alberto Velázquez; two smaller opposition papers were also closed. La Prensa remained closed for six months, putting out its next issue on January 20, 1988. The paper was occupied and closed by government troops again in 1988, reopening in January 1990, shortly after the United States invasion of Panama. Eisenmann called the issue "the first La Prensa that we have ever published without threat, without being under the gun."

== Post-military rule ==
Following democratic reforms, the paper continued to report on politics and government corruption. In the 1994 presidential election, the paper opposed Democratic Revolutionary Party (PRD) candidate Ernesto Pérez Balladares—the election's eventual winner—stating in editorials that he was a threat to the country's post-dictatorship democracy.

In 1996, Peruvian journalist Gustavo Gorriti joined the Prensa staff. He sparked government ire by reporting that a bank that had recently failed had been laundering money for Colombia's Cali Cartel, and that an agent of the cartel had contributed US$51,000 to President Ernesto Pérez Balladares' campaign. When his work visa expired, the Panamanian government refused to renew it, triggering a storm of criticism from international press NGOs and domestic opposition parties. Gorriti was given shelter in the Prensa offices, and the paper managed to delay his deportation through a stay by the Panamanian Supreme Court. Americas Watch and the Committee to Protect Journalists (CPJ) issued statements in support of Gorriti, as did British novelist John le Carré and Peruvian novelist Mario Vargas Llosa. The US pressured Panama on Gorriti's behalf, and the case was also added to the docket of the Inter-American Commission on Human Rights of the Organization of American States. The Panamanian government relented, and Gorriti's visa was later renewed.

In 1998, La Prensa and other Panamanian papers reported that the construction of a new National Assembly building had been tainted by graft, and that a representative of the US corporation HNTB had distributed US$5 million in bribes to secure the project. The following year, the paper broke the story that two members of the campaign of PRD candidate Martín Torrijos had accepted bribes from Mobil for use of a former US military base.

Former Attorney General José Antonio Sossa filed a criminal complaint for libel against four Prensa journalists in 2000: Gorriti, business editor Miren Gutiérrez Almazor, and journalists Monica Palm and Rolando Rodriguez. The complaint cited a series of stories the paper published in 1999 reporting that a drug trafficker had donated to one of Sossa's political campaigns. In 2004, Sossa also filed a complaint against Eisenmann, who had questioned his work as a public servant.

Former vice president Ricardo Arias Calderón pressed criminal defamation charges against Prensa cartoonist Julio Briceño in 2001 for a cartoon of Arias standing besides the Grim Reaper, representing his new alliance with the PRD; Arias additionally asked for a million dollars in damages. In March of the same year, Pérez Balladares' former foreign minister, Ricardo Alberto Arias, forced out Gorriti and was elected the paper's new president by a majority of shareholders. The Committee to Protect Journalists, which had awarded Gorriti its International Press Freedom Award for his work with the paper, called the election, and the resignations and demotions of investigative staff that followed, a "boardroom coup" that left "the once feisty paper a shadow of its former self".

In 2012, La Prensa published a series of investigative reports of Transcaribe Trading Company, one of the country's largest construction firms, alleging that it had made millions off favorable contracts with the government. In response, workers from the company surrounded and blockaded the Prensa building, requiring President Ricardo Martinelli to intervene to end the standoff.
