= Arturo Vallarino =

Panamanian politician

Arturo Ulises Vallarino Bartuano

First Vice President of Panama
- In office September 1, 1999 – August 30, 2004
- President: Mireya Moscoso
- Preceded by: Tomas Altamirano Duque
- Succeeded by: Samuel Lewis Navarro

Personal details
- Born: December 15, 1943 (age 82) Panama City, Panama
- Party: Nationalist Republican Liberal Movement
- Children: Javier Gil Vallarino, Marcos Guillermo Vallarino, Ariel Ulises Vallarino, Héctor Vallarino, Arturo Ismael Vallarino

Arturo Ulises Vallarino Bartuano (born 15 December 1943) is a Panamanian politician who served as the First Vice President of Panama in the cabinet of Mireya Moscoso. The Second Vice President under President Moscoso was Dominador 'Kaiser' Bazan. He was elected to the National Assembly four consecutive terms. He was President of the National Assembly from 1993 to 1994. He was the leader of the Nationalist Republican Liberal Movement, also known as Molirena and in 2008 became part of the respected group of Molirena party "elders" known as Los Notables.

Vallarino's term as First Vice President of Panama began on September 1, 1999, and ended August 30, 2004, the same dates as the term of President Moscoso. He has had a more passive participation in Panama politics and government after control of the Nationalist Republican Liberal Movement shifted to another politician.

Vallarino, a practicing attorney was a Law Professor for many years at the University of Panama Faculty of Law. He got a degree of Political Sciences from University of Panama in 1966.

He is partner in a law firm, specializing in business cases, in Panama City.

His sister Marylin Vallarino was elected in 2004 to a seat in the Legislature representing the district of Arraijan. She is a member of the Molirena party but was elected on the Partido Solidaridad ticket.

Political offices
Preceded by Tomas Altamirano Duque	First Vice President of Panama; 1999–2004	Succeeded by Samuel Lewis Navarro
