= The Wall Street Journal Special Editions =

Content distribution partnership

The Wall Street Journal Special Editions is a venture launched in 1994 by The Wall Street Journal to expand its readership abroad, especially in the Americas. It publishes pages, bearing the Journal's banner, within major daily and weekly newspapers around the world featuring selected content from The Wall Street Journal. As of 2006, its Special Editions are carried in 37 newspapers in 35 countries, translated into 10 languages, with a total combined circulation of 5.2 million.

The Wall Street Journal Americas is the Special Editions' centerpiece, published in Spanish and Portuguese in 18 Latin American nations.

== Full List of Wall Street Journal Special Editions ==
=== Wall Street Journal Americas ===
(note: the following figures are correct as of December 2004)

| Newspaper | Frequency | Location | Circulation |
|---|---|---|---|
| El Comercio | Daily (5 days) | Quito, Ecuador | 92,300 |
| El Comercio | Daily | Lima, Peru | 120,000 |
| El Mercurio | Daily | Santiago, Chile | 106,600 |
| El Nacional | Daily | Caracas, Venezuela | 90,000 |
| El Norte | Daily | Monterrey, Mexico | 119,380 |
| El Tiempo | Daily | Bogotá, Colombia | 208,192 |
| La Nación | Daily | Buenos Aires, Argentina | 159,506 |
| La Prensa Gráfica | Daily | San Salvador, El Salvador | 106,571 |
| Listín Diario | Daily | Santo Domingo, Dominican Republic | 96,000 |
| Reforma | Daily | Mexico City, Mexico | 125,478 |
| Mural | Daily | Guadalajara, Mexico | 23,609 |
| Valor Econômico | Daily | São Paulo, Brazil | NA |
| Diario La Prensa | Weekly | San Pedro Sula, Honduras | 52,478 |
| El Financiero | Weekly | San José, Costa Rica | 9,000 |
| La Prensa | Weekly | Panama | 35,900 |
| Siglo Veintiuno | Weekly | Guatemala City, Guatemala | 43,000 |
| La Prensa Gráfica | Weekly | Nicaragua | 36,820 |
| La Nación | Weekly | Paraguay | 15,634 |
| Total Circulation of The Wall Street Journal Americas | | | 1,743,075 |

=== Other Special Editions ===
| Newspaper | Frequency | Location | Circulation |
English Language
| Arab News | Weekly | Saudi Arabia | 55,000 |
| The Globe and Mail | Daily | Toronto, Canada | 311,036 |
| Jerusalem Post | Twice weekly | Jerusalem, Israel | 35,000 |
| The Independent | Weekly | Auckland, New Zealand | 9,048 |
Other - Europe
| Milano Finanza | Daily | Italy | 111,622 |
| Der Tagesspiegel | Weekly | Berlin, Germany | 136,909 |
| De Telegraaf | Daily | Amsterdam, the Netherlands | 771,296 |
| Naftemporiki | Daily | Greece | 30,000 |
| Jornal de Notícias | Weekly | Portugal | 105,000 |
Other - Africa
| City Press | Weekly | South Africa | 173,000 |
| Seminario Angolense | Weekly | Luanda, Angola | 8,500 |
Other - Asia
| Money Journal | Monthly | Beijing, China | 50,000 |
| Korean Economic Daily | Weekly | South Korea | 890,000 |
Other - Canada
| Le Journal de Montreal | Daily | Montreal, Canada | 272,352 |
Other - U.S.
| Washington Hispanic | Weekly | Washington, D.C. | 28,000 |
| Hoy | Weekly | Los Angeles, New York, Chicago | 354,000 |
| Rumbo Hispanic Edition | Weekly | San Antonio, Houston | 60,000 |
| el Sentinel | Weekly | South Florida (Fort Lauderdale/Broward County) | 95,000 |
| Total Circulation of Other Special Editions | | | 3,495,763 |
| Total circulation: | | | 5,238,838 |
