= Felipe Virzi =

Panamanian politician and businessman (1943–2022)

Second Vice President of Panama
- In office 1994–1999
- Preceded by: Guillermo Ford
- Succeeded by: Dominador Baldomero Bazán

Personal details
- Born: Felipe Alejandro Virzi López; 1943 Santiago District, Panama
- Died: 3 February 2022 (aged 79) Santiago District, Panama
- Party: PRD

Felipe Alejandro Virzi López (1943 – 3 February 2022) was a Panamanian politician. A member of the Democratic Revolutionary Party, he served as Second Vice President from 1994 to 1999. He died in the Santiago District on 3 February 2022, at the age of 79.
