= Max Delvalle =

Panamanian politician

Acting President of Panama
- In office March 24 – April 5, 1968
- In office April 8–15, 1967

Vice President of Panama
- In office October 1, 1964 – October 1, 1968
- President: Marco Aurelio Robles
- Preceded by: Sergio González Ruíz
- Succeeded by: Raúl Arango Navarro

Personal details
- Born: Max Delvalle Levy-Maduro; February 27, 1911; Panama City, Panama
- Died: December 20, 1979 (aged 68); Panama City, Panama
- Political party: Republican Party

Max Delvalle Levy-Maduro (February 27, 1911 – December 20, 1979) was a Panamanian politician who served as vice president from 1964 to 1968 and briefly served as acting president in 1967.

== Career ==
Under the Panamanian constitution, the holder of the office of "first vice president" became acting president from April 8–15, 1967. Devalle said at the time that there were only two Jewish presidents in the world, the president of Israel and himself. Delvalle was described in the press as "the first Jewish president in the history of the Americas".

President Robles continued to represent Panama at the summit in Uruguay and met with U.S. President Lyndon B. Johnson on April 13 to discuss the Panama Canal Treaty, before returning home. Delvalle then resumed his regular duties as first vice president.

Delvalle was the uncle of Eric Arturo Delvalle, who served as President of Panama from 1985 to 1988.

Political offices
Preceded by Sergio González Ruíz	First Vice President of Panama; 1964–1968	Succeeded by Raúl Arango Navarro
