= Popular Nationalist Party =

Abolished political party in Panama

Popular Nationalist Party Partido Nacionalista Popular
- Abbreviation: PNP
- Leader: Rubén Darío Paredes
- Founded: 1983
- Dissolved: 1984; 1999

The Popular Nationalist Party (Partido Nacionalista Popular, PNP) was a Panamanian centrist political party.

The PNP, which grew out of the university student movement of the 1970s and 1980s, was created in 1983 to back the presidential candidacy of Rubén Darío Paredes. In August 1983, Paredes was nominated as the Democratic Revolutionary Party candidate for president. In the face of opposition to his candidacy, he announced his withdrawal from politics in September, but later ran as a nominee of the PNP. Paredes ran a distant third in the 1984 election.

The PNP was abolished by the Electoral Tribunal in November 1984.

The PNP re-registered on 12 January 1994. It joined the Opposition Action Alliance coalition behind the official candidate Alberto Vallarino in 1999. The PNP was abolished again by the Electoral Tribunal on 17 May 1999.
