= Republican Party (Panama) =

Panamanian political party

The Republican Party (in Spanish: Partido Republicano, PR) was a Panamanian right-wing political party.

Its distant origins lie in the Liberal Renewal Party (PLR) founded in 1932. The PR was created in 1960 by José Dominador Bazán and Max Delvalle and Eric Arturo Delvalle, all of them Jewish and backed by the Jewish business community.

The PR supported the Roberto Francisco Chiari Remón administration in 1960-1964 and the Marco Aurelio Robles administration in 1964-1968. José Dominador Bazán was briefly Vice-President to Arnulfo Arias in his 11-day government of 1968, despite Arias' well-known anti-semitism. The PPR survived the period of suspension under Omar Torrijos (1969-1981) and did not participate in the 1980 balloting.

The PR joined the National Opposition Front (FRENO), a coalition of eight parties, in 1979.

The party was reborn officially on 30 June 1981 with a view to participating in the 1984 elections, though this time the 'Jewish vote' was more widely dispersed. Bazán and the Delvalles were again at its head, and the party was even more clearly allied to the country's wealthy elite, with policies of untrammeled free enterprise and embryonic authoritarianism.

It joined the UNADE coalition behind official candidate Nicolás Ardito Barletta in 1984, winning 2 seats. Eric Arturo Delvalle became First Vice-President, taking over the presidency when Nicolás Ardito Barletta was overthrown by the military on 27 September 1985, but he in turn was ousted on 27 February 1988 when he tried to dismiss Defense Forces chief Gen. Manuel Noriega. He refused to accept the action of the National Assembly in dismissing him from the latter post, and continued to be recognized thereafter as constitutional chief executive by the US government.

The Manuel Noriega’ regime provoked a split in the RP. The PR joined the official COLINA coalition for the 1989 elections, but the majority of the legitimate leadership of the RP participated in the ADOC coalition.

The PR was abolished by the Electoral Tribunal on 1 July 1991.
