= Tomás Altamirano Duque =

Panamanian politician (1934–2021)

First Vice President of Panama
- In office 1 September 1994 – 1 September 1999
- President: Ernesto Pérez Balladares
- Preceded by: Guillermo Ford
- Succeeded by: Arturo Vallarino

Personal details
- Born: 10 January 1934
- Died: 3 March 2021 (aged 87)
- Party: Democratic Revolutionary Party (PRD)
- Children: Tomás Altamirano Mantovani

Tomás Altamirano Duque (10 January 1934 – 3 March 2021) was a Panamanian politician who served as First Vice President of Panama from 1 September 1994 to 1 September 1999, under President Ernesto Pérez Balladares.

In the 1960s, Altamirano was imprisoned on fraud charges related to his government position. Military ruler Omar Torrijos pardoned him after he spent five months in jail. He later became a friend of military ruler Manuel Noriega. In June 1989, Altamirano was nominated by Noriega to become the administrator of the Panama Canal. However, in December, only two weeks before the US invasion that would remove Noriega from office, US President George H. W. Bush ignored the nomination and appointed Fernando Manfredo.

In 1994, Altamirano became vice president of Panama under Pérez Balladares. He was one of more than 200 people pardoned by the new president for actions during Noriega's rule, an action Pérez Balladares called a step toward national reconciliation.

Altamirano was the publisher of The Star and Herald of Panama City, which was the oldest English-language newspaper in Latin America until its 1987 closing. The paper's editor, Altamirano's cousin Jose Gabriel Duque, accused him of closing the paper because it had continued to cover opposition groups after the closing of independent media earlier in the year. He also was director-publisher of the daily Spanish-language newspaper La Estrella de Panamá, which in 1989 was Panama's largest.

Altamirano's son, Tomás Altamirano Mantovani, also became a politician, serving in the National Assembly of Panama. He died in a car crash on 1 March 2009 at age 49.

Political offices
| Preceded by Guillermo Ford | First Vice President of Panama; 1994–1999 | Succeeded by Arturo Vallarino |
