= Gustavo Gorriti =

Peruvian journalist (born 1948)

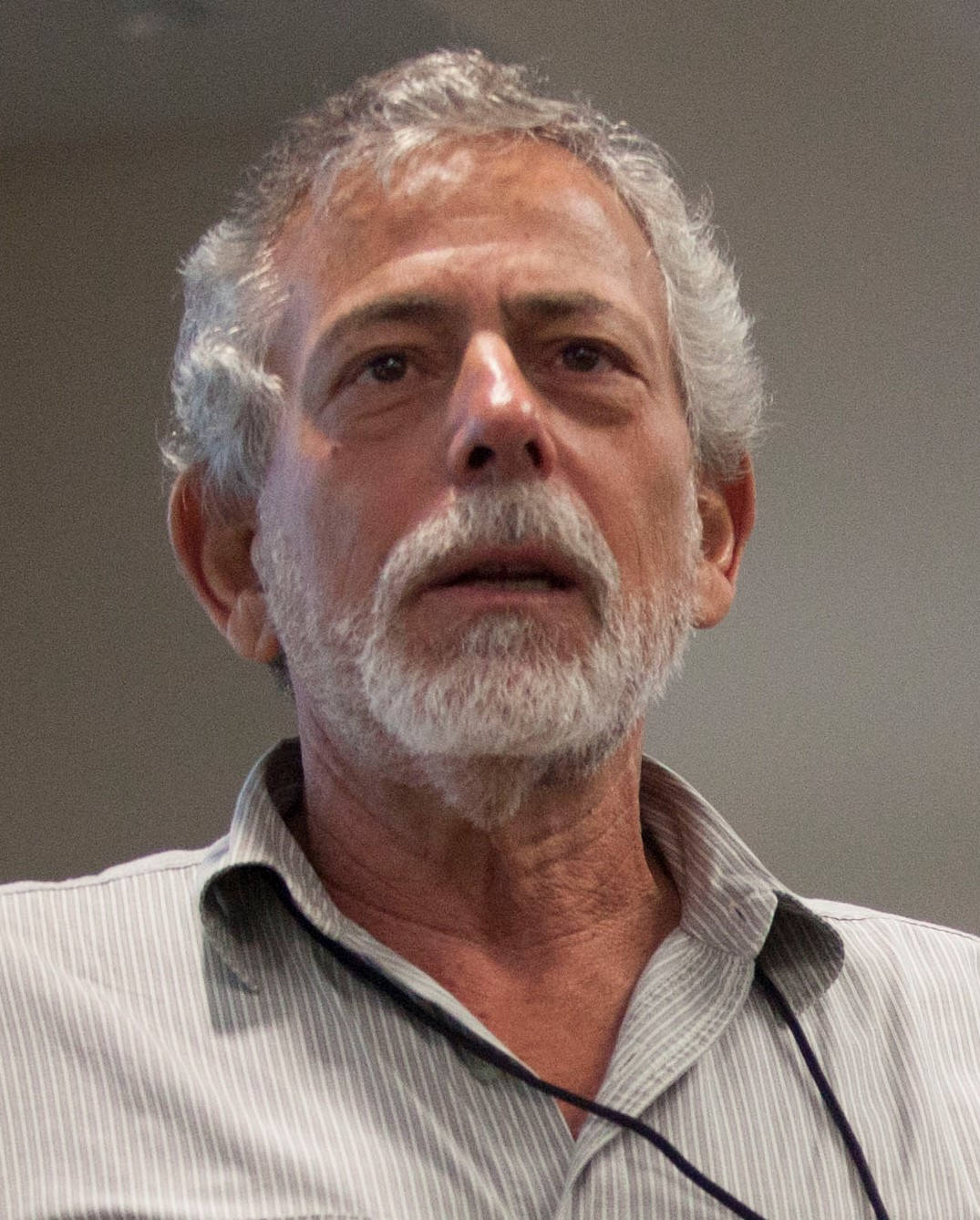
- Born: Gustavo Andrés Gorriti Ellenbogen; 4 February 1948 (age 78); Lima, Peru
- Occupation: Journalist
- Organization(s): Caretas, La Prensa
- Parents: Gustavo Gorriti (father); Dora Ellenbogen Goldenberg (mother)
- Awards: Maria Moors Cabot Prize (1992); CPJ International Press Freedom Award (1998)

Gustavo Andrés Gorriti Ellenbogen (Spanish pronunciation: [ɡusˌt̪a.β̞o ãn̪ˌd̪ɾez‿ɣ̞oˌri.t̪i e.ʝẽmˈbo.xẽn]; born 4 February 1948) is a Peruvian journalist known for his reporting on rebel groups, government corruption, and drug trafficking. In 2011, the European Journalism Centre described him as having "been awarded more prizes than probably any other Peruvian journalist". He is the founder of IDL-Reporteros.

In 2024, El País stated that Gustavo Gorriti is suffering an "unprecedented" smear campaign against a Peruvian journalist.

== Journalism in Peru ==
Gorriti first gained fame as a journalist in the 1980s reporting on Peru's internal conflicts between the government and terrorist groups such as the Shining Path. In addition to his news articles, he wrote a three-volume book on the organization.

While working for the weekly Caretas in 1992, he reported links between the government and narcotics traffickers, particularly implicating Vladimiro Montesinos, President Alberto Fujimori's "strong man". Anger over the articles led a commando squad from the Peruvian army to break into his home and abduct him during the 1992 Peruvian constitutional crisis, in which Fujimori dissolved Congress and detained several opposition figures.

Gorriti's wife, who had been present for the kidnapping, followed a plan that the pair had previously arranged, calling international press NGOs as well as the US government. The immediate international pressure caused Gorriti to be transferred to official detention the following day, a response that he later said probably saved his life. He was released on 8 April, two days after his initial abduction.

In 2009, Fujimori was convicted by a Peruvian court for ordering the Gorriti kidnapping, among other human rights abuses, and sentenced to 25 years' imprisonment. In November 2021, his former adviser, Vladimiro Montesinos, was sentenced to 17 years in prison for the kidnapping.

== Exile in US and Panama ==
Following his release, Gorriti left Peru. He then worked for a time in the US, first as a fellow at the Carnegie Endowment for International Peace in Washington, D.C. and at the University of Miami's North-South Center in Coral Gables, Florida.

Gorriti moved to Panama in 1996, reporting there for La Prensa. He began writing again about links between government officials and drug traffickers, and again was the target of threats.

That year, he reported that a bank that had recently failed had been laundering money for Colombia's Cali Cartel. He also alleged that some of the President Ernesto Pérez Balladares' appointments were guided by nepotism, and in 1997, he gained particular notice for reporting that an agent of the cartel had contributed US$51,000 to Pérez Balladares' presidential campaign. When his work visa expired, the Panamanian government refused to renew it, setting off a storm of criticism from international press NGOs and domestic opposition parties. Gorriti was given shelter in the Prensa offices, and the paper managed to delay his deportation through a stay by the Panamanian Supreme Court.

Prensa publisher and editor I. Roberto Eisenmann Jr. reported that the paper had discovered that the Panamanian cabinet had received news of a death threat against Gorriti; rather than relay the threat, the government had decided to expel Gorriti to preserve the nation's image.

Americas Watch and the Committee to Protect Journalists (CPJ) issued statements in support of Gorriti, as did British novelist John le Carré and Peruvian novelist Mario Vargas Llosa. The US pressured Panama on Gorriti's behalf, and the case was also added to the docket of the Inter-American Commission on Human Rights of the Organization of American States. The Panamanian government relented, and Gorriti's visa was later renewed.

The government then filed criminal defamation charges against Gorriti under the ley mordaza ("gag law"), carrying a maximum sentence of six years' imprisonment.

A second charge was filed against Gorriti and three other Prensa journalists in 1999 for an article in which he reported that a drug trafficker had donated to the campaign of Attorney General José Antonio Sossa, with Sossa himself supervising the investigation.

CPJ again issued a statement in his support, stating that the case "highlight[ed] the need to repeal criminal defamation and libel statutes in Panama". The case was dismissed by an appeals court in 2003.

In March 2001, Pérez Balladares' former foreign minister, Ricardo Alberto Arias, forced out Gorriti and was elected La Prensa's new president by a majority of shareholders. The Committee to Protect Journalists, which had awarded Gorriti its International Press Freedom Award for his work with the paper, called the election, and the resignations and demotions of investigative staff that followed, a "boardroom coup" that left "the once feisty paper a shadow of its former self".

== IDL Reporteros ==
After leaving Panama, Gorriti returned to Peru, working for the daily newspaper Peru21 as well as becoming the journalist in residence at the Instituto de Defensa Legal (IDL).

In 2009, he launched IDL-Reporteros, an experimental investigative journalism site. A nonprofit endeavor funded by NGOs, the site employed four full-time journalists as of 2011.

In 2023 IDL-Reporteros and Gorriti were targeted by protesters associated with La Resistencia Dios, Patria y Familia, who surrounded his home.

== Personal life ==
Gorriti is of Basque and Italian descent through his father, being distantly related to José Ignacio de Gorriti, and of Romanian Jewish descent from his mother. He is married with three children. He is a six-time national judo champion.

== Awards and recognition ==
In 1986, Gorriti was given a Nieman Fellowship at Harvard University, an honor awarded to mid-career journalists. He was awarded the Maria Moors Cabot Prize of Columbia University, the world's longest-running journalism award, in 1992 for "advancement of press freedom and inter-American understanding."

In 1998, he won the International Press Freedom Award of the US-based Committee to Protect Journalists, which honors journalists who show courage in defending press freedom despite facing attacks, threats, or imprisonment.

- Premio Nuevo Periodismo CEMEX+FNPI for lifetime achievement Tribute.
- King of Spain award in 1996 for his work as director in La Prensa, Panama’s then-foremost newspaper.
- Named Knight Press Freedom Fellow in 2025.

== Books by Gorriti ==
- Sendero: historia de la guerra milenaria en el Peru. Editorial Planeta Perú. 1990. ISBN 9789972239465.
- Gorriti, Gustavo (2019). La batalla. Planeta. ISBN 9786124431005.
- La calavera en negro. Editorial Planeta Perú. 2006.
- "Latin America's internal wars". Journal of democracy. Invierno de 1991, 2 (1): 85-98. OCLC 84084915
- Petroaudios. Lima: Planeta, 2009
