= 1983 Panamanian constitutional referendum =

A constitutional referendum was held in Panama on 24 April 1983. Voters were asked whether they approved of a series of amendments to the 1972 constitution. A reported 87.8% voted in favour, with a turnout of 66.8%.

== Results ==
Choice	Votes	%
For	476,716	87.8
Against	66,447	12.2
Invalid/blank votes	13,806	–
Total	556,969	100
Registered voters/turnout	834,409	66.8
Source: Nohlen
