= Raúl Arango =

Panamanian politician

Raúl Arango Navarro (1908 – 1984) was a politician from Panama who was Vice President of Panama and chief commander of the fire department of Panama.

== Biography ==
Arango was born on 19 August 1908. He studied at the National Institute, and graduated from the Liverpool Business School. He started working in the fire department of Panama at the age of 17, and rose to the rank of commander in April 1950.

Arango also worked as minister and ambassador of Panama, and deputy in the National Assembly of Panama (1948-52). He presented law in February 1949 on retirement and bonuses for members of the fire department. He was associated to National Liberal Party.

He was Second Vice President of Panama in Marco Aurelio Robles administration from 1964 to 1968, and concurrently served as ambassador to Spain. In the 1968 elections, he joined the successful ticket of Arnulfo Arias as First Vice President of Panama. However, he was ousted after about 10 days in office in a military coup against Arnulfo Arias on 11 October 1968.

He died on 7 August 1984.
