= Samuel Lewis Navarro =

Panamanian politician

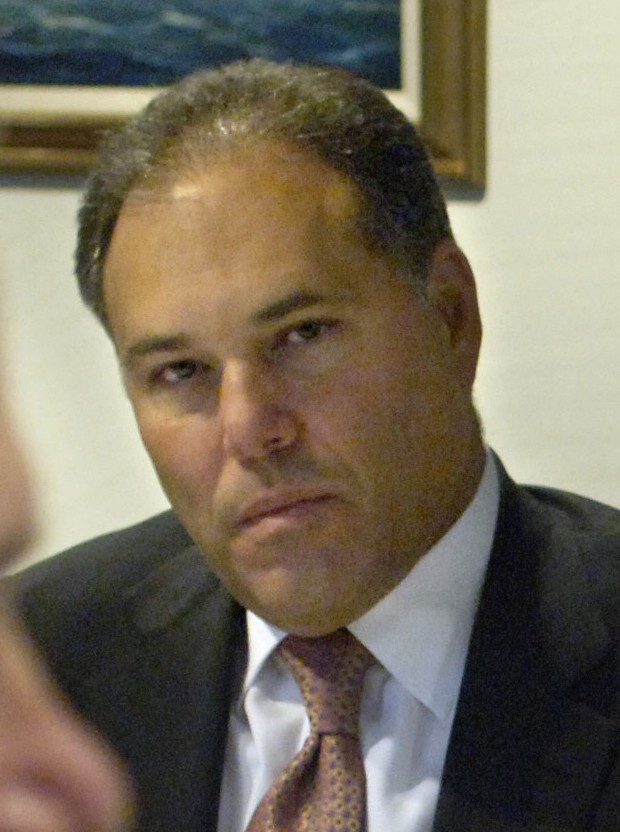
- Navarro at The Pentagon in February 2007

First Vice President of Panama
- In office 1 September 2004 – 1 July 2009
- President: Martín Torrijos
- Preceded by: Arturo Ulises Vallarino Bartuano
- Succeeded by: Juan Carlos Varela

Minister of Foreign Affairs
- In office 1 September 2004 – 1 July 2009
- President: Martín Torrijos
- Preceded by: Harmodio Arias Cerjack
- Succeeded by: Juan Carlos Varela

Personal details
- Born: 15 July 1957 (age 69) Panama City, Panama
- Spouse: Anagrethel González
- Occupation: Businessman

Samuel Lewis Navarro (born 15 July 1957, in Panama City) is a Panamanian businessman who served as the First Vice President and foreign minister from 2004 to 2009 during the administration of President Martín Torrijos.

Lewis was elected First Vice President of the Republic of Panama for the period 2004-2009 by popular vote on May 2, 2004. He took oath on September 1 together with President Martín Torrijos and Second Vice President Rubén Arosemena. On the same day, Lewis also became the Minister of Foreign Affairs. He was elected to the first Vice Presidency of the Republic on the ballot propositions of "Patria Nueva", a political program endorsed by the Revolutionary Democratic Party and the Popular Party, advocating more employment, more production and zero corruption.

He studied business administration at prestigious academic institutions in the United States, earning a BA from Georgetown University in 1979 and an MBA from American University in 1981, both in Washington, D.C.

== Family life ==
Samuel Lewis was born into a family with a tradition of public service, particularly in the international field. His great-grandfather, Samuel Lewis García de Paredes (1871–1939), as well as his grandfather, Samuel Lewis Arango (1901–1972), and his father, Gabriel Lewis (1929–1996), all held the position of Minister of Foreign Affairs of Panama before him.

Samuel Lewis is married to Anagrethel González, and they have two children. He was previously married to Mariela Delvalle, the daughter of former President Eric Delvalle and has two more children.

== Business career ==
Samuel Lewis began his business career in his family's company Empaques de Colon, where he became the general manager and president. He went on to work for other corporations, including the ELE Group, a packaging company with investments in Central America, the Caribbean and Mexico; Northsound Corporation, engaged in the production and distribution of bananas; and Red Crown Corporation, the biggest Central American company operating with regional capital dedicated to growing and selling pineapples to markets in Europe and North America. He is also the president of Calder International, a real estate company involved in housing development projects in Panama City. Since 1981 he has been a member of the board of directors of eleven industrial, real estate, farming and investment companies.

At the same time, he has participated in business organizations such as the Industrial Guild of Panama; the Panamanian Association of Business Executives (APEDE in Spanish); the Panamanian Association of Exporters (APEX in Spanish); the Panamanian Chamber of Commerce; the American Chamber of Commerce and Industry of Panama (AMCHAM); The Young Presidents' Organization, and the Gabriel Lewis Galindo Foundation, dedicated to promoting education in Panama.

== Political career ==
Lewis' participation as a citizen concerned with the defense of the interests of his country in the international field was demonstrated by his work as Special Ambassador of Panama (1994–1999) and his voluntary service in organizations and public bodies such as the Advisory Committee of the Panama Canal (1994–1999), the National Council on Foreign Affairs (1999–2003) and the Board of Directors of the Panama Canal Authority (1998–2002). The latter state institution, wholly run by Panama since December 31, 1999, is responsible for the management of the waterway connecting the Atlantic and Pacific Oceans.

Finally, his involvement in partisan politics started in 1993, when he founded the Solidarity Party, of which he was the Vice President from 1993 to 2003. He resigned from it to contribute as an independent citizen to finding solutions to the serious social, political and moral problems facing the Panamanian nation.

== External Links / References ==
SEDI State Dept

Political offices
Preceded by Arturo Vallarino	First Vice President of Panama; 2004-2009	Succeeded by Juan Carlos Varela
