= National Unity Mission Party =

The National Unity Mission Party (Partido Misión de Unidad Nacional, MUN) was a Panamanian small evangelical political party.

The National Unity Mission Party was founded on 27 March 1992 largely by people from the “Assemblies of God”.

The MUN was the only previously unregistered group other than Mother Earth Movement that had presented the requisite number of endorsements (21,000) to qualify as a party for the 1994 campaign.

The ideological foundation of the party is based to “strengthen the family and protect children and youth”.

In 1994 MUN allied with the Solidarity Party (PS) and its candidate Samuel Lewis Galindo and polled only 9,120 votes (00.85%).

The MUN was dissolved by the Electoral Tribunal, as it did not meet the legal requirements to remain active after the 1994 elections.
