= Ricardo Alberto Arias =

Panamanian diplomat

Ricardo Alberto Arias (born September 11, 1939, Panama City, Panama) was the Panamanian Ambassador to the United Nations, serving from 2004 to 2009. He is also a founding member and partner of Galindo, Arias and Lopez law firm, and is a member of the Panamanian Bar Association, the Interamerican Bar Association, and the International Bar Association.

== Education ==
Arias holds a Bachelor of Science degree in foreign service from the Edmund A. Walsh School of Foreign Service at Georgetown University, a Bachelor of Laws degree from the University of Puerto Rico, and a Master of Laws degree from Yale University.

== Career ==
From 1973 to 1978, Arias was a Professor of Fiscal Law and Administration Law at the Universidad Católica Santa María La Antigua in Panama. In 1994, he was appointed Ambassador of Panama to the United States, and from 1996 to 1998, he served as the Foreign Minister of Panama. In 1968 he helped found the law firm of Galindo, Arias, López y Arias (GALA).

In March 2001, a majority of shareholders elected Arias the new president of the paper La Prensa, which had previously been critical of Arias' party, the Democratic Revolutionary Party (PRD); he also forced out Peruvian investigative reporter Gustavo Gorriti.

The Committee to Protect Journalists, which had awarded Gorriti its International Press Freedom Award for his work with the paper, called the election, and the resignations and demotions of investigative staff that followed, a "boardroom coup" that left "the once feisty paper a shadow of its former self".

He is a founding director and former President of the Panamanian stock exchange (Bolsa de Valores de Panamá) and is currently a member of the Board of Directors of Banco General de Panama and Copa Airlines.

== Links ==
- United Nations Press Release: Ricardo Alberto Arias Biography
- Galindo, Arias y López: Ricardo Alberto Arias Biography
