= Socialist Workers Party (Panama) =

Panamanian political party

The Socialist Workers Party (Spanish: Partido Socialista de los Trabajadores, PST) was a Panamanian Trotskyist political party.

The PST was accorded legal recognition as a party in September 1983. It sought, unsuccessfully, to enlist the support of the People’s Party of Panama in an electoral front against "Yankee imperialism" in 1984. The PRT vehemently opposed the Manuel Noriega-led National Democratic Union coalition in 1984 and ran its own candidate, Ricardo Barría, for president. In 1990, after the overthrow and arrest of Manuel Noriega, the PST joined the United Patriotric Front to protest the U.S. intervention. The PST was officially deregistered in November 1984.

== See also ==
- Category:Socialist Workers Party (Panama) politicians
