= Eric Arturo Delvalle =

President of Panama (1985–1988)

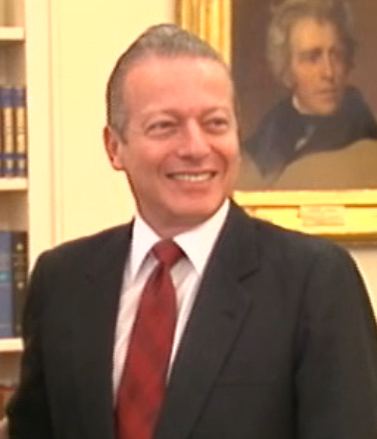
- Delvalle in 1988

31st President of Panama
- In office 28 September 1985 – 26 February 1988
- Military Leader: Manuel Noriega
- Vice President: First Vice President; Vacant; Second Vice President; Roderick Esquivel
- Preceded by: Nicolás Ardito Barletta
- Succeeded by: Manuel Solís Palma

12th First Vice President of Panama
- In office 11 October 1984 – 27 September 1985
- President: Nicolás Ardito Barletta
- Preceded by: Carlos Ozores (as Vice President of Panama)
- Succeeded by: Roderick Esquivel

Personal details
- Born: Eric Arturo Delvalle Cohen-Henríquez; 2 February 1937 Panama City, Panama
- Died: 2 October 2015 (aged 78) Cleveland, Ohio, U.S.
- Party: Republican Party
- Spouse: Mariela Delvalle

Eric Arturo Delvalle Cohen-Henríquez (2 February 1937 – 2 October 2015) was a Panamanian politician. He served as Vice President under Nicolás Ardito Barletta. Following the disputed 1984 election, and after Barletta's forced resignation, Delvalle served as President of Panama from 28 September 1985 until 26 February 1988.

In 1988, he attempted to remove Manuel Noriega as head of the armed forces but was himself deposed by the Legislative Assembly, going into hiding and eventually exile.

== Background ==
Delvalle was born in Panama City. His brother Raúl is a former member of the National Assembly (1984–1989). His uncle Max Delvalle was the first Jewish president in Latin America (both were members of Kol Shearit Israel Synagogue). He belonged to the Republican Party founded by his family.

== Presidency (1985–1988) ==
Delvalle was elected as Nicolás Ardito Barletta's Vice President in the disputed 1984 election, and after Barletta's forced resignation he served as President of Panama from 28 September 1985 to 26 February 1988. Delvalle's presidency occurred during Manuel Noriega's de facto military rule of the country, and he was a loyal ally of Noriega for much of his administration.

In 1986, US Assistant Secretary of State for Inter-American Affairs Elliott Abrams openly called on the Panamanian military to overthrow Noriega and suggested that it could lead to the restoration of military aid. The Delvalle government protested, filing a complaint with the Organization of American States; sixteen Latin American states joined Panama in condemning the US statement.

After Noriega's indictment on 4 February 1988 by the US Drug Enforcement Administration, Delvalle unsuccessfully attempted to remove Noriega from his formal post as head of the Panamanian Defense Forces. Instead, Noriega's allies in the Legislative Assembly voted on 22 February to oust Delvalle as president, appointing Education Minister Manuel Solis Palma in his place. Though initially stating that he intended to remain in Panama, Delvalle then went into hiding with the help of the American government.

Before his declaration against Noriega, Delvalle first made sure that his extended family was safe in the US embassy compound in Panama City. Delvalle did not warn his colleagues about what he was about to do, which placed them and their families at great risk of retribution from Noriega. With help from dissidents, led by Kurt Muse, Second Vice President Roderick Esquival was able to get his family belatedly into protection at the US embassy, but Esquival chose to stay behind in Panama to continue to lead resistance efforts against Noriega.

Delvalle soon went into exile in the US. The administration of US President Ronald Reagan refused to recognize the legitimacy of Delvalle's successors and continued to officially support the legitimacy of Delvalle's presidency until his term's official ending in late 1989.

Delvalle and his Noriega-appointed successors are nicknamed the "Kleenex presidents" in Panama due to their "disposability".

In 1994, he was pardoned by President Guillermo Endara for any crimes committed during the Noriega years. Delvalle was shunned by Panamanian anti-Noriega organizations in Panama before and after the 1989 US invasion of Panama, because of the manner in which he had left the country in 1988.

== Personal life and death ==
Delvalle was married to Mariela Delvalle. He died on 2 October 2015 at the age of 78 in Cleveland, Ohio. He was given a State Funeral by the Government of Panama which was held at the Kol Shearith Israel Synagogue in Panama City.

== Bibliography ==
- Harding, Robert C. (2006). The History of Panama. Greenwood Press. ISBN 031333322X.

Political offices
Preceded by Carlos Ozores	First Vice President of Panama; 1984–1985	Succeeded by Roderick Esquivel
Preceded by Nicolás Ardito Barletta	President of Panama; 1985–1988	Succeeded by Manuel Solís
