= Marco Aurelio Robles =

President of Panama (1905–1990)

President of Panama
- In office 1 October 1964 – 1 October 1968
- Vice President: Max Delvalle; Raúl Arango
- Preceded by: Roberto Chiari
- Succeeded by: Arnulfo Arias

Personal details
- Born: Marco Aurelio Robles Méndez; 8 November 1905 Aguadulce, Panama
- Died: 14 April 1990 (aged 84) Miami, Florida, United States
- Party: National Liberal Party
- Profession: Politician

Marco Aurelio Robles Méndez (8 November 1905, in Aguadulce – 14 April 1990, in Miami) was President of Panama from October 1, 1964 to September 30, 1968. He studied at the University of Panama and at the Sorbonne. Before his presidency, he served on diplomatic missions in France and United Kingdom and also as Minister of Justice (1960–1964).

Robles was the cousin of his predecessor, Roberto Francisco Chiari.

On April 16, 1990, he died in Miami from a long illness.

Political offices
| Preceded by Roberto Francisco Chiari | President of Panama; 1964–1968 | Succeeded by Arnulfo Arias Madrid |
