= Broad Popular Front =

Broad Popular Front (in Spanish: Frente Amplio Popular, FRAMPO) was a Panamanian small left-of-center political party.

The FRAMPO was created in 1977 by Renato Pereira, a former leader of the Federation of Students, and Miguel Montiel and was accorded legal recognition as a party in 1979.

The FRAMPO was a pro-Torrijos and a pro-government group oriented slightly to the left of the PRD. It joined the UNADE coalition behind official candidate Nicolás Ardito Barletta in 1984, but lost legal status by failing to win 3 percent of total vote in the 1984 Panamanian general election.
