= Civic Renewal Party =

Panamanian political party

The Civic Renewal Party (Partido Renovación Civilista, PRC) was a Panamanian right liberal political party.

The Civic Renewal Party was founded on 13 August 1992 by a group of professionals who had played key roles in the National Civic Crusade that opposed General Manuel Antonio Noriega's military dictatorship during 1987–1989.

The National Civic Crusade (Cruzada Civilista Nacional, CCN), a broad-based opposition movement composed of more than 100 groups, including members of the Roman Catholic Church, civil and professional organizations, and trade unions.

In 1994, it backed the recently resigned Comptroller General Rubén Darío Carles as part of the Alliance for Change '94 coalition and in 1999, it supported banker and former Arnulfista Party member Alberto Vallarino Clement, as a part of the Opposition Action Alliance.

Although the party elected three legislators to the unicameral Legislative Assembly in 1994, in the 1999 election it failed to garner enough votes to survive and, pursuant to Panamanian Electoral Laws, was dissolved thereafter.
