= Dominador Baldomero Bazán =

Second Vice President of Panama (1937–2006)

Dominador 'Kaiser' Baldomero Bazán (13 December 1937 – 8 August 2006) was the Second Vice President of Panama in the Mireya Moscoso administration from September 1999 to September 2004. He graduated from West Point Military Academy in 1961, and obtained a degree in civil engineering from Stanford's University in 1962.

Political offices
Preceded by Felipe Alejandro Virzi Lopez	Second Vice President of Panama; 1999-2004	Succeeded by Rubén Arosemena Valdés
