= Ernesto Pérez Balladares =

President of Panama (born 1946)

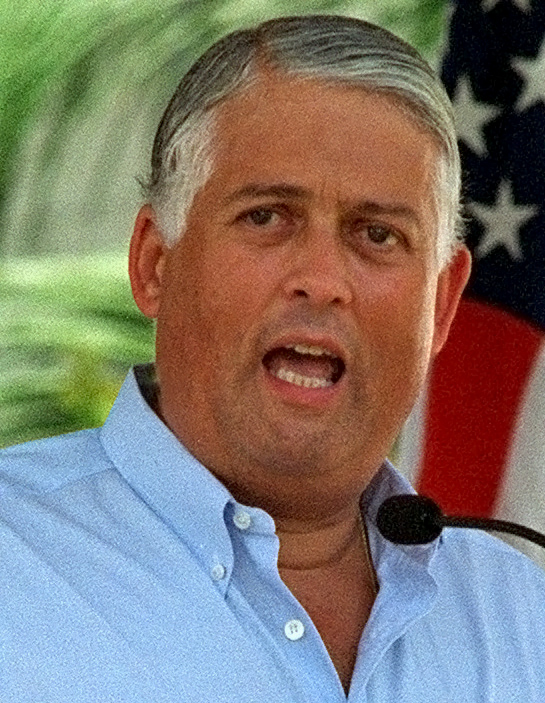
- Pérez Balladares in 1996

33rd President of Panama
- In office 1 September 1994 – 1 September 1999
- Vice President: First Vice President; Tomás Altamirano; Second Vice President; Felipe Virzi López
- Preceded by: Guillermo Endara
- Succeeded by: Mireya Moscoso

Personal details
- Born: June 29, 1946 (age 80) Panama City, Panama
- Party: Democratic Revolutionary Party (PRD)
- Spouse: Dora Boyd de Pérez Balladares

Ernesto Pérez Balladares González-Revilla (Note: Spanish pronunciation: [eɾˈnesto ˈpeɾes βaʝaˈðaɾes ɣonˈsales reˈβiʝa]) (born June 29, 1946), nicknamed El Toro ("The Bull"), is a Panamanian politician who was the president of Panama between 1994 and 1999.

Educated in the United States, Pérez Balladares worked as a banker before becoming part of the government of military ruler Omar Torrijos; in 1989, he also served as campaign manager for the pro-Manuel Noriega presidential candidate Carlos Duque. He was elected president in 1994 as the candidate of the Democratic Revolutionary Party (PRD), in a close three-way race with Arnulfista Party candidate Mireya Moscoso and salsa singer Ruben Blades.

Pérez Balladares's term was notable for free-market reforms and the privatization of government services. He also rehabilitated a number of officials from the Noriega years and sought a closer alliance with the United States than the previous administration of Guillermo Endara. Following a failed constitutional referendum to allow him a second term in office, Pérez Balladares was succeeded by Moscoso in 1999.

In 2009, prosecutors opened an investigation into charges of corruption dating to Pérez Balladares's time in office. He was placed under house arrest the following year, making him the first former Panamanian president to be arrested, and in October 2010 was charged with money laundering. A judge dismissed the charge against him in April 2011. In February 2012, Pérez Balladares was convicted of slandering comptroller Alvin Weeden by calling him a narcocriminal, and sentenced to a $3,000 fine or a year in prison.

== Background ==
Pérez Balladares received master's degrees in the US at the University of Notre Dame and the Wharton School of the University of Pennsylvania. From 1971 to 1975, he was credit officer of the City Bank for Panama and Central America. He is married to Dora Boyd de Pérez Balladares.

== Political career ==
Pérez Balladares served under military ruler Omar Torrijos as the Minister of Economy and Finances. In March 1979, he was one of the co-founders of the Democratic Revolutionary Party (PRD). He was picked to be the Secretary of the Party in 1982. However, in 1984, he clashed with new military leader Manuel Noriega, and passed several months in exile in Spain.

Pérez Balladares later served as campaign manager for Carlos Duque, Noriega's chosen candidate for the 1989 presidential election. (Note: During Noriega's rule, the presidency of Panama was held by a series of presidents nicknamed the "Kleenex presidents" in Panama due to their "disposability".) The opposition candidate, Guillermo Endara, was reported by international observers to be leading the vote by a 3-to-1 margin, but the results were annulled by the Noriega government before counting was complete. During the December 1989 US invasion of Panama, however, Endara was certified the election's winner and sworn in as the next president of Panama. During the invasion, Pérez Balladares was briefly detained and interrogated by US forces for his association with Noriega, but was then released.

Pérez Balladares himself stood as a candidate in the 1994 presidential election for the PRD, opposing Mireya Moscoso of the Arnulfista Party and the salsa singer Rubén Blades, who was then president of the party Papa Egoro. Pérez Balladares's opponents sought to emphasize his connection with Noriega, broadcasting pictures of the two together. Pérez Balladares denied the link, describing the current PRD as "diametrically opposed" to Noriega's policies. Instead, he worked to position himself as a successor to Torrijos, who was regarded as a national hero. The incumbent Arnulfista Party, meanwhile, was seen as hobbled by dissatisfaction with the perceived incompetence and corruption of Endara's government. He ultimately won the election with 33% of the vote, with Moscoso receiving 29% and Blades receiving 17%.

== Presidency (1994–1999) ==
Pérez Balladares's government was characterized by pro-free market policies. He included a number of free-market economists in his cabinet. Under his rule, both the electric and telephone companies were privatized and in 1997, Panama entered the World Trade Organization. In 1995, he reformed Panama's labor code, an action protested by 49 unions and causing his popularity to drop. Other unpopular actions by Pérez Balladares included giving $35 million in back pay to Noriega's paramilitary Dignity Battalions and doubling the salaries of his cabinet despite the country's ongoing poverty.

He rehabilitated a number of former Noriega officials in his government, including his Housing Minister, a doctor accused of helping to torture political prisoners during Noriega's rule, and his First Vice President, Tomas Altamirano Duque. Pérez Balladares ultimately pardoned more than 200 people for crimes committed during the Noriega years, calling it a step toward national reconciliation.

Pérez Balladares forged closer ties with the US, agreeing with President Bill Clinton to take in 10,000 Cuban boat people at US military bases that Endara had refused to accept, as well as providing exile to Haitian former military ruler Raoul Cédras as part of a negotiated settlement. Pérez Balladares also pledged to join the US anti-drug effort and pass new laws to prevent money laundering.

Peruvian reporter Gustavo Gorriti, working for the Panamanian newspaper La Prensa, reported in 1996 that an agent of Colombia's Cali Cartel had contributed US$51,000 to Pérez Balladares's presidential campaign. After briefly threatening to sue for libel and calling the report "journalistic terrorism", Pérez Balladares later stated that it had been correct, describing it as "the first time, perhaps in my life, that I have had to swallow my words." When Gorriti's work visa expired the following year, however, the Panamanian government refused to renew it, triggering a storm of criticism from international press NGOs and domestic opposition parties. Under pressure, the Pérez Balladares government later relented, and Gorriti's visa was renewed.

In 1998, Pérez Balladares organized a referendum to amend the constitution to allow him to serve a second consecutive term in office, stating that he needed another term to complete his reforms (the Panamanian Constitution only allows a former president to seek the office after sitting out two consecutive terms). Despite massive spending by the PRD, however, the proposal was defeated by a margin of almost 2 to 1, a result described by The Economist as "proving Panama's democracy more resilient than many dared suppose." Pérez Balladares also proposed constitutional amendments to allow penalties for a domestic or foreign journalist who "incites violent protest", and to ban the wearing of military fatigues or boots.

Because Pérez Balladares was ineligible to run again, the PRD ultimately selected Martín Torrijos, the son of Omar Torrijos, as the candidate for the 1999 Panamanian general election. He lost to the Arnulfista candidate, Mireya Moscoso. In the final weeks of Pérez Balladares's presidency, the Arnulfista Party and president-elect Moscoso accused his administration of illegally using funds from the sale of government property, issuing last-minute contracts to political allies, and selling visas to Asians wishing to illegally enter the US. Critics also accused Pérez Balladares of staffing the new Panama Canal Authority, which would oversee the Panama Canal beginning on January 1, 2000, with his own business associates and "cronies".

== Corruption allegations and arrest ==
In November 1999, following allegations that he had participated in the illegal sale of US visas to Chinese immigrants, the US revoked Pérez Balladares's tourist visa.

The Panamanian government opened an investigation of the former president for money laundering in September 2009, however not enough evidence was available to prove such allegations.

On January 14, 2010, he was placed under house arrest over accusations that he accepted money from Lucky Games SA casino. It was the first arrest of a former Panamanian president. In April, the bank account of his company Shelf Holding Inc. was frozen, and Pérez Balladares was required to hand over his passport following a trip to Peru. District Attorney Jose Ayu Prado announced in October 2010 that there was sufficient evidence to charge Pérez Balladares with money laundering. A preliminary hearing on the case was held on April 11, 2011, and the case was dismissed by the judge two weeks later. In December 2012, Ayu Prado was nominated to the Supreme Court. Perez Balladares stated via Twitter that the appointment was a trade for having persecuted him.

Pérez Balladares was later charged with slander for calling comptroller Alvin Weeden a narcocriminal. The former president was convicted on February 17, 2012, and sentenced to a $3,000 fine or a year in prison.

== Minera Petaquilla ==
In 1997, during the presidency of Ernesto Pérez Balladares, the National Assembly of Panama passed Law 9 approving a controversial mining concession contract between the state and the company Minera Petaquilla S.A. (later Minera Panama S.A.). This 30-year contract granted Minera Panama exclusive rights to explore, extract, exploit, process, refine, transport, sell and market copper and other precious metals within 13,600 hectares of land in Cocle province.

Critics argued the lopsided deal infringed upon Panama's mineral rights sovereignty and gave away too much control over national resources to a private corporation, with little foresight into long-term impacts. Allegations emerged suggesting improper influence or corruption in the concession's approval.

In December 2017, the Supreme Court of Justice of Panama ruled this 1997 law and contract were unconstitutional, after legal challenges were filed questioning its legality and Pérez Balladares's authority to broker such an agreement. The court's ruling was reaffirmed and became final in June 2021 after various appeals were rejected.

In December 2022, Panama's Official Gazette No. 29685 published Resolution No. 2022-234 from the National Directorate of Mineral Resources ordering Minera Panama to suspend mining activities and present a plan for safely preserving operations, in compliance with the court's judgement. This aimed to avoid damages and remedy conditions that could cause harm to the mining project, workers, or the environment, given Minera Panama no longer has a valid concession contract after the 2017 ruling. The resolution highlights the government's efforts to negotiate a new contract acceptable to both parties have been unsuccessful.

== Honours ==
- Philippines:
  - Grand Collar of the Order of Sikatuna, Rank of Raja (GCS) - 1995
- Spain:
  - Collar of the Order of Isabella the Catholic - 1998
- Taiwan:
  - Grand Cordon of the Order of Brilliant Jade - 1995

== Bibliography ==
- Harding, Robert C. (2006). The History of Panama. Greenwood Press. ISBN 031333322X.

Party political offices
| Preceded by Carlos Duque | PRD nominee for President of Panama; 1994 | Succeeded by Martín Torrijos |
Political offices
| Preceded by Guillermo Endara | President of Panama; 1994–1999 | Succeeded by Mireya Moscoso |
