= People's Party of Panama =

People's Party of Panama Partido del Pueblo de Panamá
- General Secretary: Rubén Dario Sousa Batista
- Founded: April 4, 1930
- Newspaper: Orientación y Lucha
- Ideology: Communism; Marxism–Leninism
- Political position: Far-left
- International affiliation: IMCWP; World Anti-Imperialist Platform

Website
- elpartidodelpueblo.org

The People's Party of Panama (Spanish: Partido del Pueblo de Panamá, PPP) is an unregistered Marxist-Leninist party in Panama. It was founded on 4 April 1930 as the Communist Party of Panama (Partido Comunista de Panamá, PCP), after Panamanian communists broke away from the Labour Party. Early leaders of the PCP included Eliseo Echévez and Cristóbal Segundo. The PCP joined the Communist International and reached its apogee of popularity during and right after World War II. In 1943 the PCP changed its name to the People's Party of Panama.

The small but well-organized party then exerted considerable influence on the Panamanian Federation of Students and on the trade union movements in Panama and the Canal Zone. It long controlled the Trade Union Federation of Workers of Panama. "After World War II the party concentrated on attacking the United States presence in Panama, leading the Panamanian government to crack down on it and then outlaw it in 1953. Subsequently, Communist influence in Panama's trade unions declined greatly and many party members defected to other groups".

In the mid-1960s, the U.S. State Department estimated the party's membership to be approximately 400.

Although small in membership, for several years during the 1970s the PPP acted as the principal source of organized political support for the Omar Torrijos government, particularly on the Panama Canal issue. It resisted the formation of the broader based Democratic Revolutionary Party (PRD) and lost a considerable amount of its power during the late 1970s as a result. The party was permitted to operate semi-publicly. In 1979 it applied for formal recognition and, with some 77,000 members, was easily able to demonstrate the required level of support. One of its candidates, running as an independent, obtained a Legislative Council seat in 1980.

In 1984 the party broke from the pro-government National Democratic Union (UNADE) coalition because UNADE no longer followed the reformist ideas of Omar Torrijos. The PPP ran its own presidential candidate in 1984 (Carlos Del Cid); in 1989 it allied with the National Liberation Coalition (COLINA) and its candidate Carlos Duque.

Since 1951 the General Secretary of the PPP has been Ruben Darío Sousa Batista (sometimes known by his pseudonym, Vicente Tello).

The PPP was derecognized by the Electoral Tribunal on 1 July 1991.
