= Nicolás Ardito Barletta =

26th President of Panama (1984–1985)

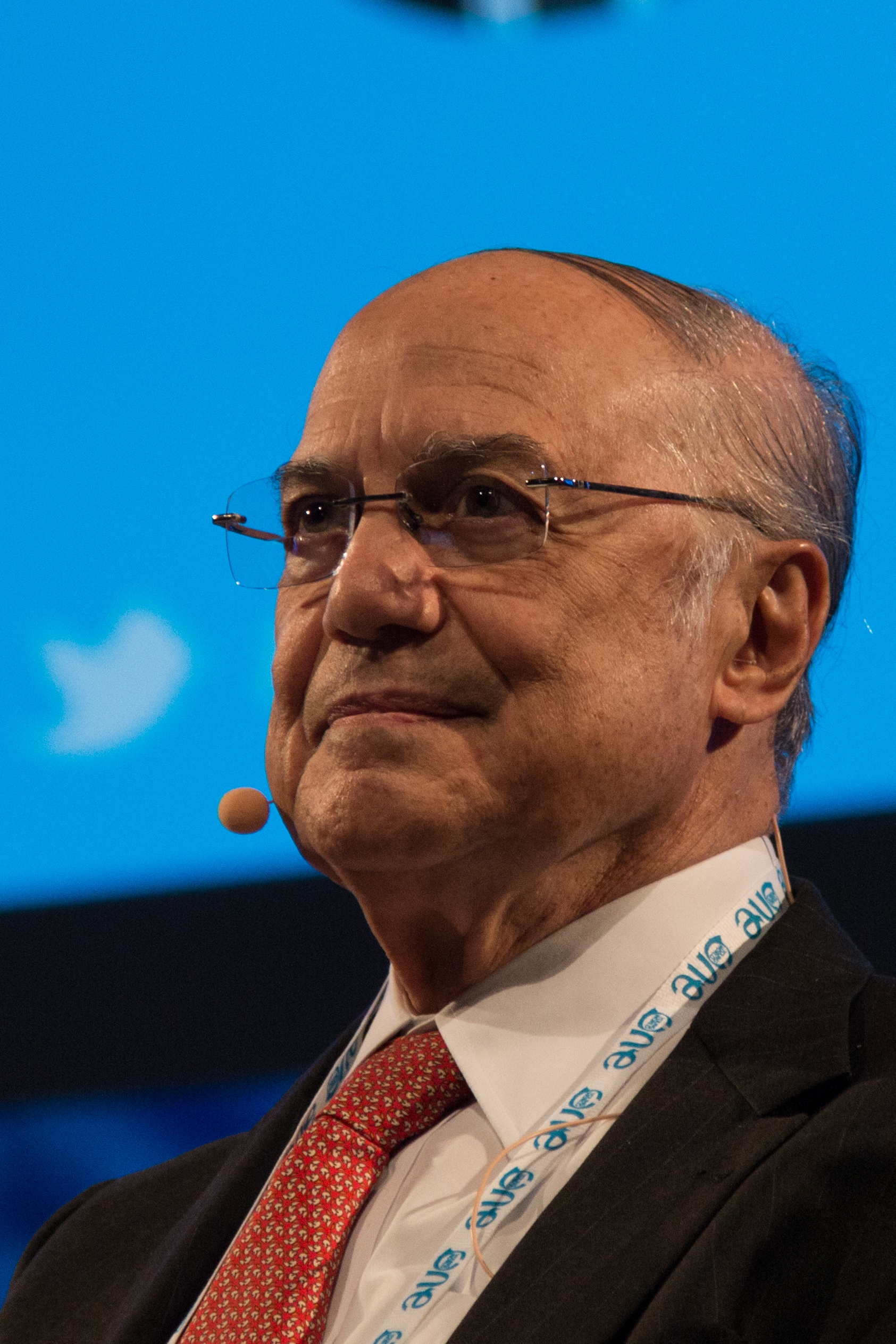
- Barletta in 2014

30th President of Panama
- In office 11 October 1984 – 28 September 1985
- Military Leader: Manuel Noriega
- Vice President: First Vice President; Eric Arturo Delvalle; Second Vice President; Roderick Esquivel
- Preceded by: Jorge Illueca
- Succeeded by: Eric Arturo Delvalle

Personal details
- Born: Nicolás Ardito Barletta Vallarino; 21 August 1938 (age 88) Aguadulce, Panama
- Party: Democratic Revolutionary Party
- Spouse: Maria Consuelo Rivera
- Education: North Carolina State University
- Occupation: Politician, economist

Nicolás Ardito Barletta Vallarino (born 21 August 1938) is a Panamanian politician who served as the 30th President of Panama from 11 October 1984 to 28 September 1985, running as the candidate of the Democratic Revolutionary Party (PRD) in the contested elections of 1984.

== Education ==
Barletta attended North Carolina State University, where he earned a Bachelor of Science degree in Agricultural Engineering in 1959, and later an M.Sc. in Agricultural Economics. In 1971, he received a doctorate in economics from the University of Chicago. The title of his PhD dissertation was "Costs and social benefits of agricultural research in Mexico".

== Early career ==
From 1968 until 1970 and from 1973 until 1978, Barletta served as one of General Omar Torrijos's most trusted advisers as minister of planning and economic policy, president of the national banking commission and a member of Panama's negotiation team on economic aspects for the Panama Canal treaties. From 1978 to 1984, he was World Bank vice president for Latin America and the Caribbean. In late 1983, he was approached by President Ricardo de la Espriella about running for president as de la Espriella's successor.

== Presidency (1984–1985) ==
=== Election in May 1984 ===
In February 1984, President Ricardo de la Espriella unexpectedly resigned the office and was succeeded by his vice president, Jorge Illueca, who did not enter the race for a full term. Barletta ran as the coalition candidate backed by the National Guard, and his candidacy had the support of the government. Opposing Barletta and the Unión Nacional Democrática (UNADE) coalition was the Democratic Opposition Alliance (Alianza Democrática de Oposición, or ADO) and its candidate, 82-year-old veteran politician Arnulfo Arias, who had previously been president three times, each time being ousted from office by a military coup.

1984 election poster in support of Barletta

The election was the country's first after 16 years of military rule, something that had been agreed upon during US negotiations that led to the signing of the Panama Canal Treaty in 1977, for which Barletta was among the negotiators for Panama. Arias's platform emphasized the need to reduce the influence of the military in Panamanian politics. Barletta's platform emphasized the re-establishment of democracy, economic development, and honest and efficient government.

The campaign proved to be bitterly contested, with both sides predicting victory. Arias and his backers claimed that Barletta was conducting the campaign unfairly. In addition, most of the media—television, radio stations, and newspapers—favored the government coalition. For example, only one of the country's five daily newspapers supported the ADO. During the election campaign, the United States government-financed National Endowment for Democracy and the American Institute for Free Labor Development provided around $20,000 in support of activists involved with Barletta's campaign. U.S. legislators Representative Hank Brown and Senator Edward Zorinsky, alongside Ambassador Everett Ellis Briggs, opposed intervention in the election by U.S. government-funded organizations.

Voting day on 6 May 1984 was peaceful, but violence led by Arias's supporters broke out the next day in front of the Legislative Palace, where the electoral board was meeting. One person was killed. The opposition charged that there was electoral misconduct and fraud. The candidates for congress on both sides challenged the vote count at the district level, delaying the final count. Meanwhile, both sides claimed victory. When the initial results showed Arias, who had the support of much of the opposition, on his way to a landslide victory, Manuel Noriega, the military strongman, halted the count. After brazenly manipulating the results, the government announced that Barletta had won by a slim margin of 1,713 votes. Independent estimates suggested that Arias would have won by as many as 50,000 votes had the election been conducted fairly. More than 60,000 votes were not included in the final count. On 16 May 1984, the district results were finally tallied by the Electoral Tribunal and Barletta was declared the winner by 1,713 votes, defeating Arias. The U.S. government was aware of this electoral manipulation, but chose not to comment on the manipulation and declared that Barletta's victory must be seen as an important step forward in Panama's transition to democracy. Noriega's rule became increasingly repressive, even as the U.S. government of Ronald Reagan began relying on him in its covert efforts to topple Nicaragua's democratically elected Sandinista government. The U.S. accepted Barletta's election and signaled a willingness to cooperate with him, despite recognizing the flaws in the election process.

=== In office ===
Barletta, a strait-laced and soft-spoken technocrat, took office on 11 October 1984. In his inaugural address, the newly elected president pledged to repair the economy, fight corruption, and unite Panama's political parties. He quickly launched an attack on the country's economic problems and sought help from multilateral institutions to support an economic restructuring program. He promised to modernize the government's bureaucracy and implement an economic program that would generate a 5% annual growth rate.

On 13 November 1984, to meet the requirements imposed by the International Monetary Fund (IMF) for a US$603 million loan renegotiation, Barletta announced economic austerity measures, including a 7% tax on all services and reduced budgets for cabinet ministries and autonomous government agencies, including the Defense Forces. In response to massive protests and strikes by labor, student, and professional organizations, he revoked some of those measures ten days later. Barletta's headstrong administrative style also offended Panamanian politicians, who had a customary backslapping and backroom style of politicking. During his tenure, the Defense Forces promised support to his program but effectively undermined the negotiations Barletta was pursuing with industrialists, labor leaders, and other business groups to achieve some economic reforms.

While Barletta was visiting New York City, government critic Hugo Spadafora was found brutally murdered and decapitated. Spadafora had revealed that he had evidence linking Noriega to drug trafficking and illegal arms dealing. Relatives of Spadafora claimed that witnesses had seen him in the custody of Panamanian security forces near the Costa Rican border immediately before his decapitated body was found on 14 September 1985. Barletta promised to bring the killers to justice and recommended an independent commission to investigate the crime. At a meeting at Defense Forces Headquarters between Barletta and the commanders, serious discrepancies arose, leading to Barletta's resignation on 27 September 1985, after only eleven months in office. Ardito Barletta was succeeded the next day by his first vice president, Eric Arturo Delvalle, who announced a new cabinet on 3 October 1985.

The ousting of Barletta is considered to have been the beginning of the end for Noriega; Barletta had been considered by Washington the best hope for a transition to democracy. Within four years, Noriega was removed from office by American military intervention.

== Post-presidency ==
Later on, Barletta was General Administrator of the Interoceanic Region Authority (ARI) from 1995 to 2000, an agency in charge of receiving, administrating, planning, and incorporating the former Panama Canal Zone to national development. Today, Barletta is a member of the Washington-based think tank The Inter-American Dialogue.

== Sources ==
- Dinges, John (1990). Our Man in Panama. Random House. ISBN 978-0-8129-1950-9.
- Koster, R.M.; Sánchez, Guillermo (1990). In the Time of the Tyrants: Panama, 1968–1990. New York: Norton. ISBN 978-0-393-02696-2.
- Panama: A Country Study. Washington: GPO for the Library of Congress, 1987. Sandra W. Meditz and Dennis M. Hanratty, editors.

Political offices
Preceded by Jorge Illueca	President of Panama; 1984–1985	Succeeded by Eric Arturo Delvalle
