= Mireya Moscoso =

President of Panama from 1999 to 2004

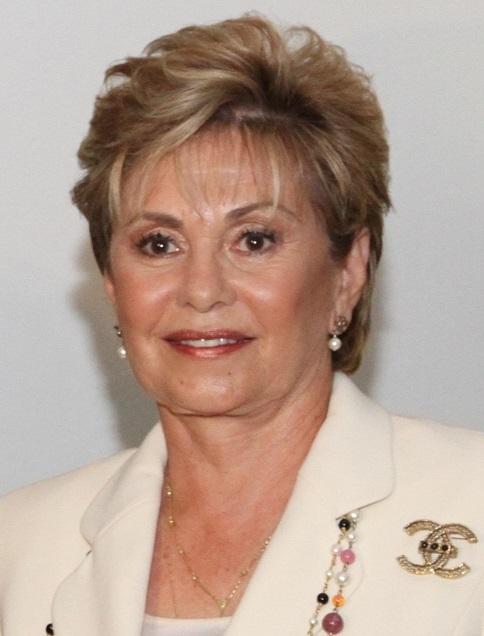
- Moscoso in 2012

34th President of Panama
- In office 1 September 1999 – 1 September 2004
- Vice President: First Vice President; Arturo Vallarino; Second Vice President; Dominador Baldomero
- Preceded by: Ernesto Pérez Balladares
- Succeeded by: Martín Torrijos

First Lady of Panama
- In office 1 October 1968 – 11 October 1968
- President: Arnulfo Arias
- Preceded by: Petita Saa
- Succeeded by: Elizabeth Roger

Personal details
- Born: Mireya Elisa Moscoso Rodríguez; 9 July 1946 (age 80) Pedasi, Panama
- Party: Arnulfista
- Spouses: Arnulfo Arias (m. 1969; died 1988); Ricardo Gruber (m. 1990; div. 1997)
- Children: Ricardo Gruber Moscoso
- Education: Miami Dade College

Mireya Elisa Moscoso Rodríguez (Note: Spanish pronunciation: [miˈɾeʝa eˈlisa mosˈkoso roˈðɾiɣes]) (born 1 July 1946) is a Panamanian politician who served as the President of Panama from 1999 to 2004. She is the country's first and to date only female president.

Born into a rural family, Moscoso became active in the 1968 presidential campaign of three-time president Arnulfo Arias, following and marrying him when he went into exile after a military coup. After his death in 1988, she assumed control of his coffee business and later his political party, the Arnulfista Party (PA). During the 1994 general elections for the presidency, she narrowly lost to the Democratic Revolutionary Party (PRD) candidate Ernesto Pérez Balladares by 4% of the vote. In the 1999 general election, she defeated the PRD candidate Martín Torrijos by 7% to become Panama's first female president.

During her tenure in office, she presided over the handover of the Panama Canal from the US to Panama and the economic downturn that resulted from the loss of US personnel. Hobbled by new spending restrictions passed by the opposition-controlled Legislative Assembly, and her administration's corruption scandals, she had difficulty passing her legislative initiatives. Her popularity declined, and her party's candidate José Miguel Alemán lost to the PRD's Torrijos in the subsequent general elections to succeed her.

== Background ==
Moscoso was born on 1 July 1946 into a poor family in Pedasí, Panama, as the youngest of six children. Her schoolteacher father died when she was ten, and Moscoso began working as a secretary upon completing her high school education. She joined the 1968 presidential campaign of Arnulfo Arias; Arias had already served two partial terms as president, both times being deposed by the Panamanian military. He won the presidency but was again deposed by the military, this time after only eleven days in office.

Arias went into exile in Miami, Florida, in the US, and Moscoso followed, marrying him the subsequent year. She was 23, and he was 67. During this period, Moscoso studied interior design at Miami-Dade Community College. After Arias' 1988 death, she inherited his coffee business. On 29 September 1991, almost two years after the US invasion of Panama that overthrew Manuel Noriega, she became president of her late husband's Arnulfista Party.

Also in 1991, Moscoso married businessman Richard Gruber. The couple adopted a son, Ricardo (born c. 1992). Moscoso and Gruber divorced in 1997.

== Presidential campaigns ==
In 1994, Moscoso ran as the presidential candidate of her deceased husband's Arnulfista Party (PA) in the general election, seeking to succeed PA president Guillermo Endara. Her main rivals were Democratic Revolutionary Party (PRD) candidate Ernesto Pérez Balladares and salsa singer Rubén Blades, who was then president of the party Papa Egoro. Moscoso and Blades sought to emphasize Pérez Balladares' connection with military ruler Manuel Noriega, broadcasting pictures of the two together, while Pérez Balladares worked to position himself as a successor to military ruler Omar Torrijos, who was regarded as a national hero. Moscoso's campaign, meanwhile, was hindered by public dissatisfaction with the perceived incompetence and corruption of Endara's government. Pérez Balladares ultimately won the election with 33% of the vote, with Moscoso receiving 29% and Blades receiving 17%.

Moscoso was named the PA candidate again in the 2 May 1999, general election. Her main opponent this time was Martín Torrijos, Omar Torrijos' son, named to represent the PRD after the failure of a constitutional referendum that would have allowed Pérez Balladares to run for a second term. Torrijos was selected in part to try to win back left-leaning voters after the privatizations and union restrictions instituted by Pérez Balladares. Moscoso ran on a populist platform, beginning many of her speeches with the Latin phrase "Vox populi, vox Dei" ("the voice of the people is the voice of God"), previously used by Arias to begin his own speeches. She pledged to support education, reduce poverty, and slow the pace of privatization. While Torrijos ran in large part on his father's memory—including using the campaign slogan "Omar lives"—Moscoso evoked that of her dead husband, leading Panamanians to joke that the election was a race between "two corpses". Torrijos allies also criticized Moscoso for her lack of government experience or college degree. However, unlike in 1994, it was now the PRD that was hampered by the scandals of the previous administration, and Moscoso defeated Torrijos with 45% of the vote to 37%.

== Presidency (1999–2004) ==
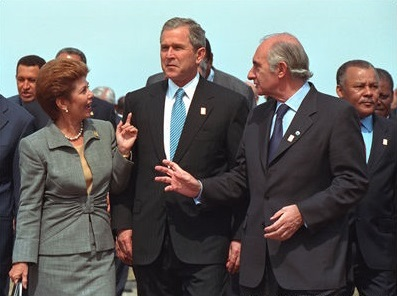
Moscoso, Fernando De la Rúa and US president George W. Bush during the 3rd Summit of the Americas.

Moscoso took office on 1 September 1999. Because she was divorced when she assumed the presidency, her older sister Ruby Moscoso de Young served as her First Lady.

Facing a PRD-controlled Legislative Assembly, Moscoso was limited in her ability to make new policy. She was also hampered by strict new restraints Pérez Balladares had passed on spending public money in the final days of his term, targeted specifically at her administration.

On 31 December 1999, Moscoso oversaw the handover of the Panama Canal from the US to Panama under the Torrijos–Carter Treaties. Her government then faced the challenge of cleaning up environmental problems in the Canal Zone, where the US Army had long tested bombs, biological agents, and chemical weapons. Remaining issues included lead contamination, unexploded munitions, and stockpiles of depleted uranium. Though Moscoso fired all of Pérez Balladares' appointments from the Panama Canal Authority and appointed supermarket magnate (and future president) Ricardo Martinelli as its head, the Authority retained its autonomy from her administration. At the same time, Panama's economy began to struggle due to the loss of income from American canal personnel.

Moscoso worked to end Panama's role in international crime, passing new laws against money laundering and supporting tax transparency. The legislation allowed Panama to be removed from international lists of tax havens. Meanwhile, violent crime rose sharply during Moscoso's tenure. In September 2000, under pressure from the US and some Latin American governments, Moscoso's government gave temporary asylum to former Peruvian spy chief Vladimiro Montesinos, who had fled Peru after being videotaped bribing a member of its congress.

In December 2000, human remains were discovered at a Panamanian National Guard base, incorrectly believed to be those of Jesús Héctor Gallego Herrera, a priest murdered during the Omar Torrijos dictatorship. Moscoso appointed a truth commission to investigate the site and those at other bases. The commission faced opposition from the PRD-controlled National Assembly, who slashed its funding, and from PRD's president Balbina Herrera, who threatened to seek legal action against the president for its creation. It ultimately reported on 110 of the 148 cases it examined, of which 40 had disappeared and 70 were known to be murdered. The report concluded that the Noriega government had engaged in "torture [and] cruel, inhuman, and degrading treatment", and recommended further exhumation and investigation.

During her term, Moscoso was often accused of nepotism for her administrative appointments and faced several corruption scandals, such as the unexplained gift of US$146,000 in watches to Legislative Assembly members. By 2001, her second year in office, Moscoso's approval rating had fallen to 23%, due to corruption scandals and concern for the economy. That year, she attempted to pass a tax reform package through the Legislative Assembly, but the proposal was opposed by both the private sector and organized labor. In 2003, the US ambassador publicly criticized Moscoso for the growth of corruption during her term. By the end of her term, her presidency was "criticized as rife with corruption and incompetence" and "widely regarded as weak and ineffectual".

She was criticized in 2004 when the press revealed that she had spent hundreds of thousands of dollars at public expense on luxury clothing and jewelry during her presidency.

Herself barred by the Constitution of Panama from a second consecutive term, Moscoso was succeeded by her former rival Martín Torrijos in the 2004 election. Shortly before leaving office, Moscoso sparked controversy by pardoning four men—Luis Posada Carriles, Gaspar Jiménez, Pedro Remon, and Guillermo Novo Sampol—who had been convicted of plotting to assassinate Cuban president Fidel Castro during a 2000 visit to Panama. Cuba broke off diplomatic relations with the country, and Venezuelan president Hugo Chávez recalled the nation's ambassador. Moscoso stated that the pardons had been motivated by her mistrust of Torrijos, saying, "I knew that if these men stayed here, they would be extradited to Cuba and Venezuela, and there they were surely going to kill them there." Moscoso also issued pardons to 87 journalists for defamation convictions dating back as far as 14 years. On 2 July 2008, all of the 180 pardons Moscoso had issued were overturned as unconstitutional by the Supreme Court.

== Post-presidency ==
During the Torrijos presidency, Moscoso remained an active member of the opposition. In September 2007, she criticized the appointment as the head of the National Assembly of PRD politician Pedro Miguel González, who was wanted in the US for the murder of US Army sergeant Zak Hernández. In the same year, she joined Endara and Pérez Balladares in lobbying the Organization of American States to investigate the Hugo Chávez government's refusal to renew the broadcasting license of opposition station Radio Caracas Televisión Internacional in Venezuela.

Since leaving office, Moscoso has also served as a member of the Woodrow Wilson International Center for Scholars' Council of Women World Leaders, a network intended "to promote good governance and enhance the experience of democracy globally by increasing the number, effectiveness, and visibility of women who lead at the highest levels in their countries."

== Honors ==
=== Foreign honours ===
- (Kingdom of the Two Sicilies) Royal House of Bourbon-Two Sicilies:
  - Knight Grand Cross of the Two Sicilian Royal Sacred Military Constantinian Order of Saint George, Special Class
- Monaco:
  - Knight Grand Cross of the Order of Saint-Charles
- Taiwan:
  - Grand Cordon of the Order of Brilliant Jade

== Bibliography ==
- Harding, Robert C. (2006). The History of Panama. Greenwood Press. ISBN 031333322X.
- Skard, Torild (2014) "Mireya Moscoso" in Women of Power – Half a century of female presidents and prime ministers worldwide, Bristol: Policy Press ISBN 978-1-44731-578-0.

Political offices
| Preceded by Ernesto Pérez Balladares | President of Panama; 1999–2004 | Succeeded by Martín Torrijos |
