= 1928 Panamanian general election =

General elections were held in Panama on 5 August 1928 to elect both a new President of the Republic and a new National Assembly.

== Background ==
Prior to the elections there was a split in the Liberal Party, resulting in two Liberal candidates for president. There was no Conservative candidate.

== Campaign ==
In 1928 President Rodolfo Chiari wrested control of the Liberal Party apparatus from Belisario Porras Barahona. The president also controlled four of seven posts on the national electoral board. The combination of these two factors gave Rodolfo Chiari nearly insurmountable powers and severely curbing his opponents' ability to compete effectively in elections.

== Results ==
=== President ===
Candidate	Party or alliance	
Florencio Harmodio Arosemena	Chiarista National Union	Chiarista Liberal Party
Florencio Harmodio Arosemena	Chiarista National Union	Conservative Party
Florencio Harmodio Arosemena	Chiarista National Union	Labor Party
Florencio Harmodio Arosemena	Chiarista National Union	Agrarian Party
Florencio Harmodio Arosemena	Chiarista National Union	Democratic Party
Jorge Eduardo Boyd	Porrista National Coalition	Porrista Liberal Party
Jorge Eduardo Boyd	Porrista National Coalition	PCF
Jorge Eduardo Boyd	Porrista National Coalition	Workers' Republican Party
Total
Source: Political Handbook of the World

=== National Assembly ===
Party	Seats
Chiarista Liberal Party	30
Conservative Party	11
Labor Party	1
Agrarian Party	1
Democratic Party	1
Porrista Liberal Party	0
Conservative Party (Fabrega)	0
Workers' Republican Party	0
Independents	2
Total	46
Source: Political Handbook of the World

== Aftermath ==
Immediately after President Arosemena's resignation on 2 January 1931, the Supreme Court decided that the election of the First, Second and Third Vice-Presidents in October, 1930, was unconstitutional and invited Ricardo Joaquín Alfaro Jované (Minister to the United States), who was elected First Vice-President in 1928, to become President of the Republic.
