= 1918 Panamanian presidential election =

Presidential elections were held in Panama on 16 September 1918.

On 4 June 1918 the sudden death of President Ramón Maximiliano Valdés triggered a political earthquake and Ciro Luis Urriola, the First Vice-president succeeded him Elections for the National Assembly were due on 7 July, and the Assembly would choose the man to see out the remainder of Valdés’s term. The new administration probably feared that it would be unable to gain a majority in the National Assembly, and issued a decree postponing the municipal and the national elections. “The Washington government expressed doubt as to the constitutionality of the decree and, invoking Article 136 of the constitution, asked that it be withdrawn”.

The opposition gained a majority in the National Assembly, but the government contested a number of decisions and requested that the American electoral commission decide the disputes. Toward the end of August the American chargé gave a partial report of the findings of the committee and urged the National Assembly to elect Ricardo Arias Feraud president. The final judgment was that the government had won a majority of the National Assembly. "With the State Department’s blessing, Belisario Porras Barahona became president of Panama for the second time".

The First Vice-president Pedro Antonio Díaz de Obaldía assumed the presidency on 1 October and was succeeded by Belisario Porras Barahona, as soon as he returned from the United States, on 12 October.

== Results ==
=== President ===
Candidate	Party	For		Against	
Candidate	Party	Votes	%	Votes	%
Belisario Porras Barahona	Porrista Liberal Party	20	60.61	13	39.39
Ricardo Arias Feraud	Chiarista Liberal Party	13	39.39	20	60.61
Total		33	100.00	33	100.00
Source: Escritas Históricos de Panamá

=== First Vice President ===
Candidate	Party	For		Against	
Candidate	Party	Votes	%	Votes	%
Pedro Antonio Díaz	Conservative Party	20	60.61	13	19.70
Rodolfo Chiari	Chiarista Liberal Party	10	30.30	23	34.85
Ramón F. Acevedo	Chiarista Liberal Party	3	9.09	30	45.45
Total		33	100.00	66	100.00
Source: Escritas Históricos de Panamá

=== Second Vice President ===
Candidate	Party	For		Against	
Candidate	Party	Votes	%	Votes	%
Ernesto Tisdel Lefevre	Porrista Liberal Party	20	60.61	13	39.39
Manuel Quintero Villarreal	Chiarista Liberal Party	13	39.39	20	60.61
Total		33	100.00	33	100.00
Source: Escritas Históricos de Panamá
