= 1932 Panamanian general election =

General elections were held in Panama on 5 June 1932 to elect a new President of the Republic and a new National Assembly. Harmodio Arias Madrid of the Liberal Doctrinaire Party (PLDo) was elected President, whilst the PLDo emerged as the largest party in the National Assembly, winning 14 of the 32 seats.

== Campaign ==
During the presidential election campaign the Liberal Party divided into three factions; the Chiarista Liberals (PLCh) led by former president Rodolfo Chiari, the Liberal Doctrinaire Party supporting Harmodio Arias Madrid and the Reform Liberals (PLR), led by Francisco Arias Paredes ("don Pancho"). The Chiarists nominated Augusto Samuel Boyd, the PLDo chose Arias Madrid, and the PLR selected Arias Paredes. However, shortly before the end of the campaign Boyd withdrew from the race and the PLCh backed the PLR's Arias Paredes.

The election took place in the context of increased hostility towards the United States and intense Panamaian nationalism. Harmodio Arias Madrid pledged during the campaign to enter into a new Panama Canal treaty.

== Conduct ==
Although the 1931 revolt toppled Florencio Harmodio Arosemena's administration, it had not removed the structural hegemony of the Panamanian elite, a condition that severely limited the new regime's effectiveness. Before Arosemena's ousting, followers of former president Rodolfo Chiari controlled both the National Police and the electoral board. After the uprising, the Chiaristas still wielded considerable influence among the police and commanded a majority of votes on the electoral board.

To prevent Chiari's followers from voting more than once, the Alfaro Jované administration requested American assistance in devising a plan to prevent multiple voting. The US provided the government with an indelible red dye to stamp voters' hands once they had cast their ballots. The voting results underscored the extent to which the insurgents now controlled the nation's electoral machinery. Although the Chiaristas figured out how to erase the ink and vote more than once, it did not prevent the Chiarista-backed candidate from winning.

For the first time in the history of presidential elections in Panama, neither party requested American intervention. with American interference deemed to have become undesirable to all factions and parties.

== Results ==
=== President ===
Candidate	Party	Votes	%
Harmodio Arias Madrid	Liberal Doctrinaire Party	39,533	
Francisco Arias Paredes	Liberal Renewal Party	29,282	
Total			
Source: Nohlen

=== National Assembly ===
Party	Seats	+/–
Liberal Doctrinaire Party	14	New
PLR–PLCh	11	–19
Conservative Party	5	–6
Unionist Center Party	1	–
Agrarian Party	1	0
Total	32	–14
Source: Political Handbook of the World
