= List of ambassadors of China to Panama =

Coordinates: 25.051622°N 121.533175°E

Chinese Ambassador to Panama
- Incumbent; Xu Xueyuan since 11 March 2024
- Inaugural holder: Ouyang Geng
- Formation: 1 January 1910; 116 years ago

The Chinese ambassador to Panama is the official representative of the People's Republic of China to the Republic of Panama since 2017.

== List of representatives ==
| Designated | Accredited | Ambassador | Chinese language zh:中国驻巴拿马大使列表 | Observations | List of heads of state of Panama | Term end |
|---|---|---|---|---|---|---|
| January 1, 1910 | Owyang King | zh:欧阳赓 | Consul General (1858 - 1941) | Puyi | Pablo Arosemena | January 1, 1911 |
| March 1, 1912 | | | The Republic of China was founded consuls were designated. | Zhao Bingjun | Belisario Porras Barahona | |
| November 13, 1913 | Samuel Sung Young (Hsiung Chung-chin) | 冯祥光 | A University, 1906; appointed junior secretary of the Board of Post and Communications, 1908; president of Tangshan Engineering College in North China, 1908–12; secretary of the Chinese Commission to the Panama Pacific International Exposition, | Xiong Xiling | Belisario Porras Barahona | January 1, 1916 |
| January 1, 1917 | Xu Shanqing | 徐善慶 | | Duan Qirui | Ramón Maximiliano Valdés | January 1, 1918 |
| November 29, 1918 | Wu Peiguang | 吴佩洸 | 1919-1921, consul general to Panama: In 1922 he was assistant commissioner for rendition of Weihaiwei negotiations. | Qian Nengxun | Belisario Porras Barahona | June 13, 1921 |
| June 13, 1921 | Yang Shuwen | 杨书雯 | 1915 Consul in Ottawa | Yan Huiqing | Belisario Porras Barahona | January 1, 1921 |
| November 25, 1921 | Iuming C. Suez | zh:史悠明 | Chargé d'affaires | Yan Huiqing | Belisario Porras Barahona | |
| December 31, 1921 | | | A Legation of the Republic of China was stationed in Panama-City. | Yan Huiqing | Belisario Porras Barahona | |
| January 1, 1922 | Philip K. C. Tyau | zh:刁作谦 | | Wang Ch'ung-hui | Belisario Porras Barahona | February 1, 1926 |
| February 1, 1926 | Liao Ngantow | 廖恩焘 | (1864 – 1954) With residence in Havanna, Cuba | Du Xigui | Rodolfo Chiari | October 1, 1929 |
| February 1, 1935 | Shen Jinding (Shen Chin-ting) (1896 – 2000) | zh:沈觐鼎 | In 1934 he resided in Panama-City, later served in the San José (Costa Rican) Tegucigalpa (Honduras) an San Salvador (El Salvador). | Chiang Kai-shek | Harmodio Arias Madrid | September 1, 1942 |
| September 1, 1942 | Tu Yun-tan | 涂允檀 | With residence in Panama City, concurrently accredited as minister to Honduras es:Anexo:Embajadores de China en Honduras, Costa Rica and El Salvador Tu Yuen-ten | Chiang Kai-shek | Ricardo Adolfo de la Guardia Arango | November 1, 1947 |
| September 1, 1948 | Cheng Chen-yu | 郑震宇 | And did not attend the office in El Salvador | Weng Wenhao | Domingo Díaz Arosemena | July 1, 1952 |
| January 1, 1952 | Wang-teh Yu | zh:王季征 | (March 26, 1914): From 1953 to 1957 he was concurrently accredited as ambassador in San Salvador and Tegucigalpa.; From 1965 to 1968 he was head of the mission in Tripoli. | Chen Cheng | José Antonio Remón Cantera | |
| January 1, 1952 | | | The Legation of the Republic of China in Panama was upgraded to an embassy. | Chen Cheng | José Antonio Remón Cantera | |
| January 1, 1954 | | | Ambassadors were sent to Panama. | Yu Hung-Chun | José Antonio Remón Cantera | |
| January 1, 1954 | Kiding Wang | 于望德 | | Yu Hung-Chun | José Antonio Remón Cantera | September 1, 1956 |
| September 1, 1956 | Tuan Mou-lan | zh:段茂瀾 | (*September 27, 1899 in Anhwei - February 26, 1980) Ed. Columbia Univ. (Ph.D.) 1927 | Yu Hung-Chun | Ernesto de la Guardia Navarro | July 1, 1959 |
| July 1, 1959 | Ma Hsin-yeh | zh:馬星野 | | Chen Cheng | Ernesto de la Guardia Navarro | November 1, 1964 |
| November 1, 1964 | Huang Jen-lin | 黃仁霖 | J.L. Huang | Yen Chia-kan | Marco Aurelio Robles Méndez | February 1, 1975 |
| February 1, 1975 | Tseng Hsien-kuei | zh:曾憲揆 | (*August 21, 1926 in Hubei- December 21, 1987) graduated from Shanghai Aurora University in his early years and went to study in Spain and received a bachelor's degree in political department University of Madrid. Worked in the South Vietnamese free Pacific society, in 1959 to Taiwan. Since then served as the Ministry of Foreign Affairs Protocol Secretary, director of the Secretary, director of communication, deputy director and other staff.: In 1966 he was Counselor of the Embassy of the Republic of China in Madrid Spain.; In 1970, he was promoted to ministerial minister.; In the same year as ambassador to the Republic of China in Bolivia.; From 1975 to 1987 as ambassador to the Republic of China in Panama. | Chiang Ching-kuo | Demetrio Basilio Lakas | June 1, 1987 |
| June 1, 1987 | Sung Ch'ang-chih | zh:宋長志 | Sung Ch'ang-chih, had established a long-running relationship with Manuel Noriega. Noriega had traveled to Taiwan early in his career for military and intelligence training, where he became friends with Admiral Sung Ch'ang-chih. Sung subsequently became chief of the General Staff and defense minister. | Yu Kuo-hwa | Erick Arturo del Valle | December 1, 1990 |
| January 1, 1991 | Su Ping-chao | 蘇秉照 | | Hau Pei-tsun | Guillermo Endara Galimany | January 1, 1996 |
| June 1, 1996 | Jason Yuan | zh:袁健生 | | Lien Chan | Ernesto Pérez Balladares | October 1, 1998 |
| October 1, 1998 | Lan Chih-ming | 藍智民 | Mar 9, 2001 Deputy Minister of Foreign Affairs | Vincent Siew | Ernesto Pérez Balladares | December 1, 2000 |
| December 1, 2000 | David C.Y. Hu | 胡正堯 | | Tang Fei | Mireya Moscoso | January 1, 2004 |
| January 1, 2004 | Tomas Hou | 侯平福 | | Yu Shyi-kun | Martín Torrijos | January 1, 2008 |
| October 1, 2008 | Simon Ko | 柯森耀 | | Liu Chao-shiuan | Martín Torrijos | September 2, 2013 |
| September 2, 2013 | Diego L. Chou | 周麟 | Diego Chou (周麟) | Sean Chen (politician) | Ricardo Martinelli | July 1, 2014 |
| October 1, 2015 | José María Liu | 劉德立 | 2009 fue: Chief of Protocol | Mao Chi-kuo | Juan Carlos Varela | May 1, 2017 |
| December 14, 2016 | Miguel Li-jey Tsao | 曹立傑 | | Chang San-cheng | Juan Carlos Varela | |
| June 13, 2017 | | | The governments in Beijing and Panama City established diplomatic relations. | Li Keqiang | Juan Carlos Varela | |
| October 24, 2017 | Wei Qiang | zh:魏强 | | Li Keqiang | Juan Carlos Varela | March 10, 2024 |
| March 11, 2024 | Xu Xueyuan | zh:徐学渊 | | Li Qiang | José Raúl Mulino | current |
