= Acción Comunal =

Panama political movement (1923-1932)

Acción Comunal was a nationalist and anti-American political movement in Panama during the 1920s and 1930s. It was responsible for a coup on January 2, 1931, that deposed President Florencio Harmodio Arosemena.

== Ideology ==
The movement focused on the education of Panamanian children in the love of their country, the correct use of the Spanish language, demanding payments in balboas, and not buying in establishments that lacked Panamanian workers or whose signs were in English. The movement promoted state intervention in the economy, and the replacement of the Hay-Bunau Varilla Treaty in order to retain Panamanian sovereignty in the Panama Canal Zone.

== History ==
Acción Comunal was founded on August 19, 1923, by Ramón Mora, Víctor Florencio Goytía, José Pezet, José Manuel Quiros, Alberto Guardia Jaén, Manuel Gálvez, Enrique Gerardo Abrahams and others. The group's name was given by Goytía, and Mora became its president. The movement emerged as a reaction to the growing American influence.

Initially, Acción Comunal worked as a secret society. New members registered by marking their fingerprint with blood alongside their signature. The movement had its own anthem and newspaper.

In 1926, during the government of Rodolfo Chiari, negotiations were held for a new treaty (the Kellogg-Alfaro Treaty). Acción Comunal saw the treaty as disadvantageous for Panama, and they expressed their anger which spread into the general public. Harmodio Arias Madrid, despite not being a member, spoke against Chiari's decisions within the National Assembly, rejecting the treaty.

=== Coup d'état attempt ===
Acción Comunal considered the Liberals to be the cause of U.S. dominance in Panama. When Arosemena assumed the presidency in 1928, the movement called him a puppet of Chiari, who was considered a "dictator."

On January 2, 1931, the movement conducted a coup that involved taking arms, controlling communications, taking the barracks, and assaulting the Presidency. The assault on the Presidency was commanded by Arnulfo Arias, who joined the movement in 1930. The coup was aborted by Goytía, who feared U.S. intervention, but Arnulfo Arias kept fighting. The coup resulted in eight deaths and the end of Arosemena's leadership. After the coup, Harmodio Arias Madrid assumed the presidency.

While the U.S. did not intervene militarily, AC pressured for the restoration of constitutional order, resulting in Harmodio Arias transferring power to the envoy in Washington, D.C. With the endorsement of the Supreme Court of Justice, Ricardo J. Alfaro finished Arosemena's presidential term. The coup affected the relationship between the two countries for years to come.

== End of movement ==
The Acción Comunal had not planned for what would happen after a successful coup, dividing the movement. The movement ended up trapped between the Panamanian oligarchy and the U.S. government, who each imposed conditions and candidates. In Alfaro's government, only two or three members of the movement were in the cabinet, diluting the nationalist character. In the elections of 1932, Arias assumed the presidency, dividing the group beyond repair. Some members joined Harmodio Arias, some went with Goytía, and others remained independent, ending the movement.

Some of the former members, including Ezequiel Fernández Jaén and Harmodio Arias, established the National Revolutionary Party in 1932, which later became the Panameñista Party under Arias' direction.
