= 1916 Panamanian presidential election =

Presidential elections were held in Panama on 25 June 1916.

The battle lines were drawn almost a year in advance, with Ramón Maximiliano Valdés running as Belisario Porras Barahona’s handpicked successor against the Liberal dissident Rodolfo Chiari Robles.

In 1916 Porras asked Washington to stay out.

The factions of the Liberal and Conservative parties which supported Rodolfo Chiari, the opposition candidate for president, pleaded for more United States supervisors to prevent the President from fixing the results. The Woodrow Wilson administration cooperated with Belisario Porras Barahona and his party easily won.
