= Gonzalo Brenes =

Panamanian composer (1907–2003)

- Born: May 18, 1907; David, Chiriquí, Panama
- Died: January 4, 2003 (aged 95); David, Chiriquí, Panama
- Education: National Institute of Music; Leipzig Conservatory
- Occupations: Composer; Musicologist; Civil servant; Politician; Educator
- Organizations: National Assembly of Panama · National Institute of Music

Gonzalo Brenes Candanedo (May 18, 1907 – January 5, 2003) was a Panamanian composer, musicologist, civil servant, politician and educator. He was known for his work collecting and publishing Panamanian folk music. His compositions blended Panamanian folk songs with European classical music. He served a term in the National Assembly of Panama, and from 1953 to 1960 he was Panama's Secretary of Culture. He taught at several institutions in Panama, including serving as the Advisory Director of Panama's National Institute of Music.

== Early life and education ==
The son of Don Agustín Brenes and Aurora Candanedo Gutiérrez, Gonzalo Brenes Candanedo was born on May 18, 1907, in David, Chiriquí, Panama. He studied piano in his youth with a variety of teachers, and began his higher education studies in music at the National Institute of Panama after winning a music scholarship through a performance competition in 1923. There he was a pupil of Dr. José Dolores Moscote with whom he studied music until he graduated in 1927. He pursued further studies at the Leipzig Conservatory (now the University of Music and Theatre Leipzig) in Germany where he was a pupil of composer Sigfrid Karg-Elert. He studied for four years at the conservatory from 1927 until his graduation in 1931. There he learned to speak German, and was heavily influenced by the music at St. Thomas Church, Leipzig which he attended regularly while in that city. He also made the acquaintance of composers Richard Strauss and Igor Stravinsky during his time in Germany.

== Composer and researcher ==
Brenes was highly impacted by his studies with Karg-Elert who emphasized the importance of using folk music as a source of inspiration for music composition in keeping with his own ideas of nationalism as it impacted music composition. Karg-Elert encourgaged Brenes to examine the music of his own people and culture to inspire his music composition writing, and accordingly his music composition writing while studying under Karg-Elert embraced Panamanian music forms like saloma, cumbia, and tamborito in combination with classical European music. This interest in Panamanian music blossomed further in Brenes's later career as a musicologist and folk song collector. His passion for Panamanian music was further reinforced after Brenes returned to Panama in 1931 when he read Narciso Garay’s Tradiciones y cantares de Panamá.

Brenes did extensive musicology research in the Los Santos and Herrera provinces of Panama. He collected folk music of that region which led to the publication of his book Desarrollo musical de Panamá a partir de la República (Panama City) and the folk song collection Tondas del trópico niño (Panama City, 1955) which included 70 of the Panamanian songs from his research. This latter work became widely used in public school music education programs in Panama, and some of these songs were performed and recorded by professional musicians. His research also influenced his composition writing, including his opera La cucarachita mandinga which used a libretto by Rogelio Sinan.

== Educator and politician ==
In addition to his work as a researcher, Brenes was also active as an educator and politician. He began his teaching career on the staff of the Instituto Panamericano in his native city in 1931 where he taught both music and history for one year. He then taught at both the Normal School of Teachers (La Escuela Normal de Institutoras) and the National Institute of Panama after being appointed to the faculties of those schools by Panama's president Harmodio Arias Madrid. Those positions were obtained partly through his political connections as an active member of the Agrarian Party.

When Juan Demóstenes Arosemena succeeded Arias Madrid as Panama's president, Brenes's employment changed, and he taught at the Escuela Normal de Santiago from 1938 to 1940. From 1940 to 1943 he again taught in his native city of David, and from 1943 to 1947 he worked as a music educator in Costa Rica. At the request of Costa Rican writer and politician Carlos Luis Sáenz he founded and served as music director of a choir made up of Costa Rican laborers and Costa Ricans living in poverty. In 1948 he taught in Mexico where he befriended musicologist Adolfo Salazar and composers Rodolfo Halffter, Luis Sandi, and Manuel Ponce.

In 1949 Brenes returned to his hometown of David after being offered a position as associate editor of the newspaper Ecos del Valle. He was elected first as member of the National Assembly of Panama, and then as Panama's Secretary of Culture. He held the latter position from 1953 to 1960. After this he worked as the Advisory Director of the National Institute of Music of Panama. Up into the last years of his life he continued to teach on the faculty of the Centro Regional Universitario de Chiriquí.

Gonzalo Brenes died on January 5, 2003, in his hometown of David, Chiriquí, Panama.
