= Ma Hsin-yeh =

Chinese journalist and diplomat (1909–1991)

Ma Hsin-yeh (Ma Xingye)
- 馬星野 马星野
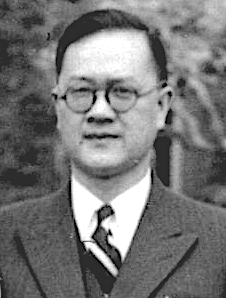
- Born: Ma Yun-wei 馬允偉 (style name Ma Wei 字馬偉); September 13, 1909; Zhejiang Province, Pingyang County, Wanquan District, Huling Township, Chen’ao Village
- Died: March 11, 1991 (aged 81); Taipei, Taiwan
- Citizenship: Republic of China Taiwan
- Education: Xiamen University (attended); Central Party School (present National Chengchi University); University of Missouri
- Occupations: Journalist, Educator, Publisher, Government Leader
- Partner: Gu Zuwen 辜祖文 (1911–1991)
- Children: Ma Shang-keng (Ma Shanggeng) 馬上庚 (M); Ma Shao-yeh (Ma Shaoye) 馬少野 (M); Ma Ta-an (Ma Da'an) 馬大安 (Diana Ip; F)
- Writing career
- Pen name: 馬星野

Ma Hsin-yeh (Chinese: 馬星野; pinyin: Mǎ Xīngyě; Wade–Giles: Ma^{3} Hsing^{1}-yeh^{3}; September 13, 1909 – March 11, 1991) was born in Pingyang County, Zhejiang Province, and enjoyed a notable career as a pioneering Chinese journalist, educator, publisher, government executive and diplomat. Ma was known as the "King of Journalism" (新聞王), and collectively with his native place compatriots Xie Xia-xun the "Chess King" (謝俠遜; “棋王”) and Su Bu-qing the "Math King" (蘇步青; "數學王"), were known as the "Three Kings of Pingyang" (平陽三王). The Pingyang County Government has also officially named Ma as one of the top-ten most significant cultural-historical figures of the county. Ma adopted his penname Hsin-yeh (星 xīng 野 yě) as his personal name some time following his study abroad at the University of Missouri School of Journalism. The name incorporates the two characters for "stars" and "plain" from a line in the Tang dynasty poet Du Fu's poem Thoughts When Traveling at Night: "Stars hang low above the wide, flat plain, And up rides the moon as the mighty river flows on" (星垂平野闊, 月涌大江流). Years later in 1984 when Ma was head of the Central News Agency, the School awarded him its highest honor, the Missouri Honor Medal for Distinguished Service in Journalism.

== Biography ==
Ma was the second eldest and only son of six children. His father, Ma Yulin (馬毓麟; Ma Minzhong 馬敏中), was a teacher and poet; and, although of modest means, the family placed great emphasis on education. Ma's grandfather, Ma Weifan (馬維藩), assumed primary responsibility for his early education and imposed a strict study regimen. In 1923 at the age of 14 Ma passed the examination to enter the Wenzhou No.10 Middle School, one of the top provincial schools in Zhejiang. His Chinese teacher there was a 26-year-old Chu Tzu-ch'ing, later to become a leading literary figure in the Modernist movement arising from the May Fourth Movement. According to Ma Hsin-yeh, among all his school year teachers, it was Chu Tzu-ch'ing who made the deepest impression on him, and throughout their later lives teacher and student maintained contact.

In 1926 at age 16 Ma first entered Xiamen University which at the time was a haven for prominent scholars and intellectuals seeking refuge from the upheaval brought about by the troops involved in the Northern Expedition. Among these were Lin Yutang, Dean of the Liberal Arts College, and faculty Lu Xun and Gu Jiegang. Unfortunately, due to student unrest forcing closure of the university, Ma's stay amounted to only a few months of self-study. In the very next year, however, he was able to transfer to the newly formed Central Party Affairs School (中央黨務學校, Zhong yang dang wu xue xiao) in Nanjing, forerunner of National Chengchi University. On the occasion of Chiang Kai-shek's first visit to address the student body as School President, Ma Hsin-yeh was assigned to serve as his recording secretary. Chiang was so impressed with him that he ordered Ma to take on the editorship of the school journal. The following year in 1928 Ma graduated at the top of his class. Although a student for only eight months, he later credited this time with molding his intellect for a lifetime.

The historian and May Fourth Movement leader Luo Jialun who had been acting as the Central Party Affairs School Provost, was called to Beijing that winter to assume the presidency of Tsinghua University, and he invited Ma Hsin-yeh to serve as his Secretary, Editor of the Tsinghua Journal, and also to pursue further studies. But the very next year in 1929 Ma was called back to his alma mater in Nanjing which was in the process of changing from a Party Affairs School to a School of Politics. Along with other faculty, Ma got his first real experience in publishing as an editor of the school's magazine, Politics and Public Opinion (政治與民意, Zheng zhi yu min yi). In 1931 Ma Hsin-yeh was selected as one of six candidates to study education and economics in the US; however, following his own interests, Ma requested to attend the University of Missouri School of Journalism. In his two years at Missouri Ma took classes in both journalism and international politics. He was particularly impressed by the practical approach to journalistic education which centered on the various roles involved in the actual production of the school newspaper, the University Missourian.

Ma Hsin-yeh's contributions as an educator began soon after his graduation from Missouri in 1933. In May of the next year, amidst the escalating Sino-Japanese War, he was once again called back to Nanjing, and at the behest of Chiang Kai-shek headed the newly created (1935) Journalism Department at the School of Politics. In Chongqing while serving as Director of the Journalism Division of the Kuomintang Central Propaganda Department (國民黨中央宣傳部新聞事業處), Ma founded the Chinese Journalism Association (中國新聞學會) in 1941, and in the following year on behalf of the Association formulated the Chinese Journalists' Creed (中國新聞記者信條), a twelve item code of ethics in the spirit of Missouri School of Journalism founder Walter Williams' 1914 Journalist's Creed but written for the Chinese situation. Well after the move of National Chengchi University to Taipei, Ma remained a guiding figure for the School's Department of Journalism. Through such efforts, Ma Hsin-yeh influenced the development of Chinese journalism into the modern era.

In addition to his educational and organizational work, Ma Hsin-yeh held a number of important executive roles in journalism and government. In 1945 he became publisher of the Central Daily News (中央日報社) in Nanjing, and later in the critical 1948–1949 period successfully shepherded it through a challenging move to Taiwan. Among Ma Hsin-yeh's many governmental appointments, his five-year term as Ambassador Extraordinary and Plenipotentiary of the Republic of China to Panama from 1959 to 1964 ranks as one of his most distinguished.

== Family ==
Ma Hsin-yeh married his wife Gu Zuwen 辜祖文 in 1936 in Nanjing. She was a talented student from Changsha, Hunan, at the Central School of Politics who once won first place in a Nanjing city-wide women college students' oratory competition in memory of the Mukden Incident. Their children include Ma Shang-keng (Ma Shanggeng) 馬上庚 (M), Ma Shao-yeh (Ma Shaoye) 馬少野 (M) and Ma Ta-an (Ma Da'an) 馬大安 (F). Ma Shang-keng (1940–1983) was a leading Chinese-American theoretical physicist and educator in statistical mechanics.

== Selected works ==
Some works written or edited by Ma Hsin-yeh include:

- 戰時中國報業 Zhan shi zhong guo bao ye with Cheng Qiheng 程其恒 (1944) 铭真出版社, Gui lin : Ming zhen chu ban she; OCLC 302041584
- 新聞自由論 Xin wen zi you lun (1948) 南京日報 [Nanjing]:Nanjing ri bao; OCLC 370567914
- 新聞與時代 Xin wen yu shi dai (1970) 雲天出版社 [Taibei] Yun tian chu ban she; OCLC 29925972
- 革命故事 Ge ming gu shi (1980) 中央文物供應社, Tai bei shi : Zhong yang wen wu gong ying she; OCLC 813779763
- 我的留學生活 Wo de liu xue sheng huo (1981) 中華日報, Tai bei shi : Zhong hua ri bao; OCLC 707416883
- 生命中的第一次（第二集） Sheng ming zhong de di yi ci （di er ji） (1985) 中華日報社, Tai bei shi : Zhong hua ri bao she; OCLC 818647414
- ‘’說言論自由 : 兼論中共滲透傳播媒體統戰陰謀 Shuo yan lun zi you : jian lun Zhong gong shen tou chuan bo mei ti tong zhan yin mou‘’ (1985) 黎明文化事業公司, Taibei Shi : Li ming wen hua shi ye gong si; OCLC 579736851

== Sources ==
- Poetry and prose of the Tang and Song, Xianyi Yang and Gladys Yang, 1984; Beijing, China:Chinese Literature; Distributed by China International Book Trading Corp.; ISBN 978-7507100624
- 新聞界三老兵 Xin wen jie san lao bing, Ma Zhisu 馬之驌 [ed](1986) 經世書局, Tai bei shi : Jing shi shu ju; LCCN Permalink: https://lccn.loc.gov/87178798; OCLC 814226253
- 馬星野先生紀念集 Ma Xingye xian sheng ji nian ji Ma Da'an et al 馬大安等 [eds](1992）中央日報出版部, Taibei Shi : Zhong yang ri bao chu ban bu
- "Toward a History of the Chinese Press in the Republican Period", Stephen R. MacKinnon; Modern China, Jan., 1997, Vol. 23, No. 1, pp. 3–32, Sage Publications, Inc.; Stable URL: https://www.jstor.org/stable/189462
- The English-language Press Networks of East Asia, 1918–1945, Peter O'Connor, 2010; Brill/Global Oriental; ISBN 1905246676; ISBN 978-1905246670; doi:10.1163/ej.9781905246670.i-414
- "Print Capitalism, War, and the Remaking of the Mass Media in 1930s China", Chin Sei Jeong; Modern China, July 2014, Vol. 40, No. 4, pp. 393–425, Sage Publications, Inc.; Stable URL: https://www.jstor.org/stable/24575604
- "Intellectuals and the One-party State in Nationalist China: The Case of the Central Politics School (1927–1947)", Wang Chen-Cheng; Modern Asian Studies, November 2014, Vol. 48, No. 6, pp. 1769–1807, Cambridge University Press; Stable URL: https://www.jstor.org/stable/24494647
- 星垂平野闊：一代報人馬星野老師 Xing chui ping ye kuo: Yi dai bao ren Ma Xingye lao shi Huang Chao-heng (Huang Zhaoheng) 黃肇珩, Wu Dehli (Wu Deli) 吳德里 and Ma Ta-an (Ma Da'an) 馬大安等 [eds: digital book](2014）義美聯合電子 Taibei Shi : Yi mei lian he dian zi
