= 1920 Panamanian presidential election =

Presidential elections were held in Panama on 2 August 1920.

On 30 January 1920 President Belisario Porras Barahona resigned to stand for election in August. "Convinced that the ballot would be rigged, supporters of his opponent, Ciro Luis Urriola, repeatedly petitioned for U.S. supervision, only to be told the answer was no. Faced with this political death sentence, Ciro Urriola pulled out".

Belisario Porras Barahona was elected "almost unanimously in one of the quietest elections in the history of the republic".

== Results ==
Candidate	Party	Votes	%
Belisario Porras Barahona	Porrista Liberal Party	18,472	
Ciro Luis Urriola	Chiarista Liberal Party		
Total			
Source: Escritas Históricos de Panamá
