= Urriola =

Urriola is a surname. Notable people with the surname include:

- Ciro Luis Urriola (1863–1922), Panamanian politician
- Malú Urriola (1967–2023), Chilean poet
- Martiniano Urriola (1823–1888), Chilean colonel
