= Vice President of Panama =

Second-highest political position in the Government of Panama

Vice President of the Republic of Panama
- Vicepresidente de Panamá

- Incumbent; Vacant since 1 July 2024
- Style: Mr. Vice President (Informal); The Honorable (Formal); His Excellency (Diplomatic, outside Panama)
- Seat: Panama City, Panama
- Term length: 5 years; renewable once, non-consecutively
- Constituting instrument: Constitution of Panama
- Inaugural holder: Pablo Arosemena, José Domingo de Obaldia and Carlos Antonio Mendoza
- Formation: September 1904
- Website: Presidencia de la República

The vice president of Panama is the second-highest political position in the Government of Panama. Since 2009, the position of Vice President has been held by 1 person.

Before 1945 there were positions of presidential designates elected by the National Assembly for a two-year term. The positions of presidential designates were replaced in 1945 by two vice presidents.

According to the current constitution, Vice President is elected in the same ticket as the President of Panama.

== Presidential designates 1904–1945 ==
Before the 1946 constitution was adopted, there were positions of three presidential designates: first designate (Primer Designado a la Presidencia), second designate (Segundo Designado a la Presidencia) and third designate (Tercer Designado a la Presidencia).

Term	President	First designate	Second designate	Third designate	Notes	Image
1904–1906	Manuel Amador Guerrero	Pablo Arosemena	José Domingo de Obaldia	Carlos Antonio Mendoza		
1906–1908	Manuel Amador Guerrero	José Domingo de Obaldia	Federico Boyd	Rafael Aizpuru		
1908–1909	José Domingo de Obaldía	José Agustín Arango	Carlos Antonio Mendoza	Juan M. Lambert		
1909–1910	José Domingo de Obaldía	Carlos Antonio Mendoza	Juan M. Lambert	Vacant	Mendoza succeeded to the presidency	
1910	Carlos Antonio Mendoza	Juan M. Lambert	Vacant	Vacant		
1910	Carlos Antonio Mendoza	Pablo Arosemena	Federico Boyd	Rodolfo Chiari	Arosemena succeeded to the presidency	
1910–1912	Pablo Arosemena	Federico Boyd	Rodolfo Chiari	Vacant		
1912–1914	Belisario Porras	Rodolfo Chiari	Ramón Maximiliano Valdés	Aristides Arjona		
1914–1916	Belisario Porras	Ramón Maximiliano Valdés	Manuel Quintero	Ciro Urriola		
1916–1918	Ramón Maximiliano Valdés	Ciro Urriola	Ramón F. Acevedo	Pedro Antonio Díaz	Urriola succeeded to the presidency	
1918	Ciro Urriola	Ramón F. Acevedo	Pedro Antonio Díaz	Vacant		
1918 (Sep-Oct)	Ciro Urriola	Belisario Porras	Pedro Antonio Díaz	Ernesto Lefevre	Porras succeeded to the presidency	
1918–1919	Belisario Porras	Pedro Antonio Díaz	Ernesto Lefevre	Vacant		
1919–1920	Belisario Porras	Ernesto Lefevre	Vacant	Vacant	Lefevre succeeded to the presidency	
1920–1922	Belisario Porras	Federico Boyd	Guillermo Andreve	Julio Fábrega		
1922–1924	Belisario Porras	Rodolfo Chiari	Ignacio Quinzada	Nicanor A. De Obarrio		
1924–1926	Rodolfo Chiari	Enrique Adolfo Jiménez	Carlos Laureano López	Enrique Linares		
1926–1928	Rodolfo Chiari	Tomás Gabriel Duque	Carlos Laureano López	Enrique Linares		
1928–1930	Florencio Harmodio Arosemena	Ricardo Alfaro	Carlos Laureano López	Eduardo Chiari		
1930–1931	Florencio Harmodio Arosemena	Tomás Gabriel Duque	Carlos Laureano López	Enrique Linares		
1931	Harmodio Arias Madrid	Ricardo Alfaro	Carlos Laureano López	Eduardo Chiari	Alfaro succeeded to the presidency	
1931–1932	Ricardo Alfaro	Carlos Laureano López	Eduardo Chiari	Vacant		
1932–1934	Harmodio Arias Madrid	Domingo Díaz Arosemena	Carlos W. Muller	José de Obaldía Jované		
1934–1936	Harmodio Arias Madrid	Enrique Adolfo Jiménez	Ricado A. Morales	Miguel Ángel Grimaldo		
1936–1938	Juan Demóstenes Arosemena	Augusto Samuel Boyd	Héctor Valdés	Ezequiel Fernández		
1938–1939	Juan Demóstenes Arosemena	Augusto Samuel Boyd	Ezequiel Fernández	Jacinto López y León	Boyd succeeded to the presidency	
1939–1940	Augusto Samuel Boyd	Ezequiel Fernández	Jacinto López y León	Vacant		
1940–1941	Arnulfo Arias	José Pezet Arosemena	Ernesto Jaén Guardia (resigned on 9 October 1941)	Aníbal Ríos Delgado		
1941	Ricardo de la Guardia	José Pezet Arosemena (resigned on 11 October 1941)	Aníbal Ríos Delgado	Vacant		
1941	Ricardo de la Guardia	Aníbal Ríos Delgado (resigned on 13 December 1941)	Vacant	Vacant		
1941–1945	Ricardo de la Guardia	Vacant	Vacant	Vacant		
1945	Ricardo de la Guardia	Jeptha Brawner Duncan Guillén-Arosemena	Miguel Ángel Grimaldo	Alcibíades Arosemena		

== Vice presidents (1945–2009) ==
The 1946 constitution introduced two vice presidents instead of three. The position of second vice president was abolished in the 1972 constitution and reintroduced with the 1983 constitutional reforms. Vice Presidents were elected in the same ticket with the President.

Term	President	First Vice President	Second Vice President	Notes
1945–1948	Enrique Adolfo Jiménez	Ernesto de la Guardia	Raúl Jiménez (politician)	
1948–1949	Domingo Díaz Arosemena	Daniel Chanis	Roberto Chiari	Chanis succeeded to the presidency
1949	Daniel Chanis	Roberto Chiari	Vacant	Chiari succeeded to the presidency
1949 (Nov)	Roberto Chiari	Vacant	Vacant	
1949–1951	Arnulfo Arias	Alcibíades Arosemena	José Ramón Guizado	Arosemena succeeded to the presidency
1951–1952	Alcibíades Arosemena	José Ramón Guizado	Vacant	
1952–1955	José Antonio Remón Cantera	José Ramón Guizado	Ricardo Arias	Guizado succeeded to the presidency
1955	José Ramón Guizado	Ricardo Arias	Vacant	Arias succeeded to the presidency
1955–1956	Ricardo Arias	Vacant	Vacant	
1956–1960	Ernesto de la Guardia	Temistocles Díaz	Heraclio Barletta	
1960–1964	Roberto Chiari	Sergio González Ruíz	José Dominador Bazán	
1964–1968	Marco Aurelio Robles	Max Delvalle Levy-Maduro	Raúl Arango Navarro	
1968	Arnulfo Arias	Raúl Arango Navarro	José Dominador Bazán	
1968–1972	Junta	Vacant	Vacant	
1972–1975	Demetrio B. Lakas	Arturo Sucre Pereira (resigned)		
1975–1978	Demetrio B. Lakas	Gerardo González Vernaza		
1978–1982	Arístides Royo	Ricardo de la Espriella		Espriella succeeded to the presidency
1982–1984	Ricardo de la Espriella	Jorge Illueca		Illueca succeeded to the presidency
1984	Jorge Illueca	Carlos Ozores Typaldos		
1984–1985	Nicolás Ardito Barletta	Eric Arturo Delvalle	Roderick Esquivel	Delvalle succeeded to the presidency
1985–1987	Eric Arturo Delvalle	Roderick Esquivel	Vacant	Left office on 8 September 1987
1989	Francisco Rodríguez	Carlos Ozores Typaldos	Vacant	
1989–1992	Guillermo Endara	Ricardo Arias Calderón	Guillermo Ford Boyd	
1992–1994	Guillermo Endara	Guillermo Ford Boyd	Vacant	
1994–1999	Ernesto Pérez Balladares	Tomás Gabriel Altamirano Duque	Felipe Alejandro Virzi Lopez	
1999–2004	Mireya Moscoso	Arturo Ulises Vallarino Bartuano	Dominador Baldomero Bazán	
2004–2009	Martín Torrijos	Samuel Lewis Navarro	Rubén Arosemena Valdés	

== Vice presidents after 2009 ==
Vice presidents have been elected in the same ticket with the President.

Term	President	Vice President
2009–2014	Ricardo Martinelli	Juan Carlos Varela
2014–2019	Juan Carlos Varela	Isabel Saint Malo
2019–2024	Laurentino Cortizo	José Gabriel Carrizo
2024–present	José Raúl Mulino	Vacant

== Gallery of former designates and vice presidents ==
Ex Vice Presidents

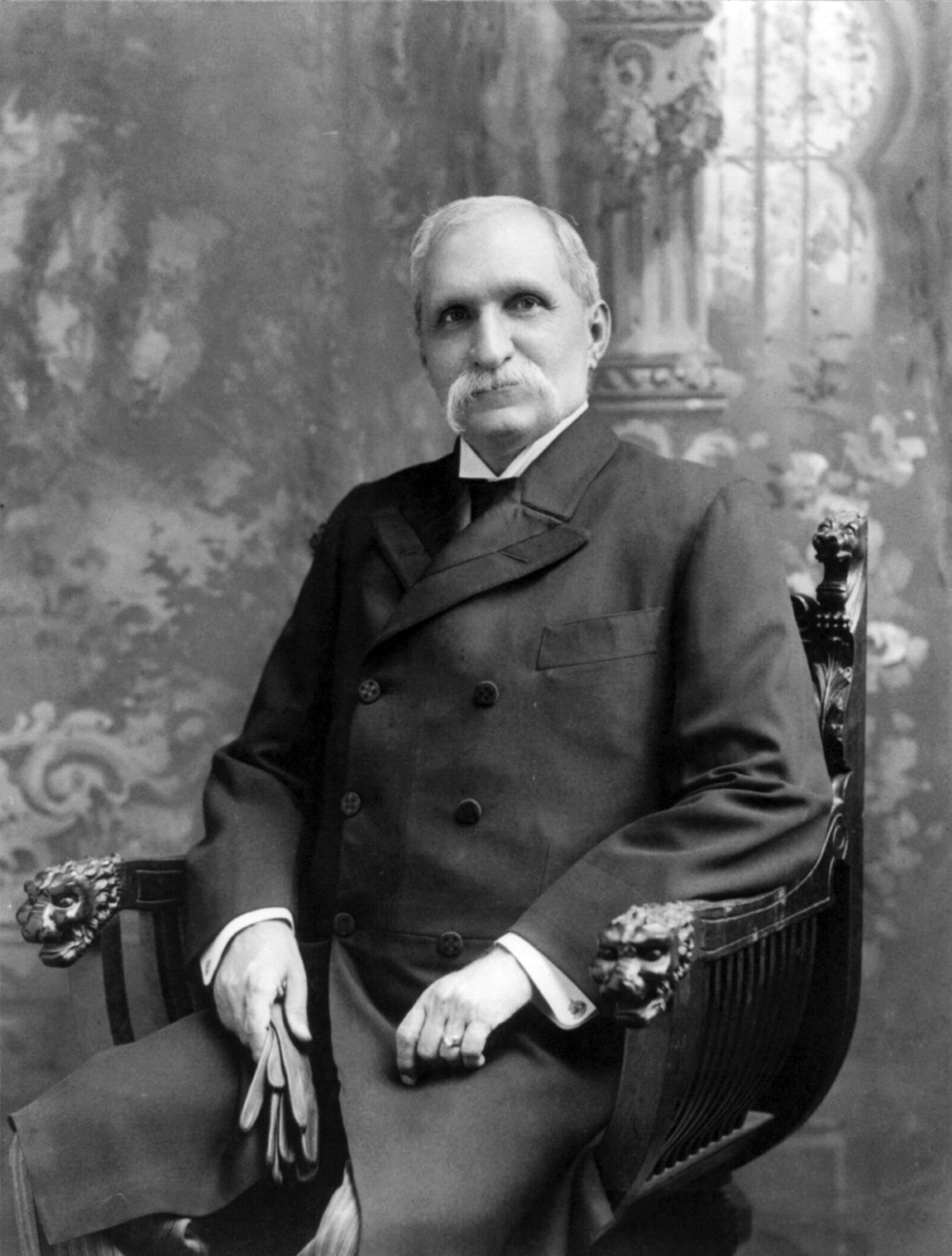
José Domingo de Obaldía (National Liberal); 1904–1908

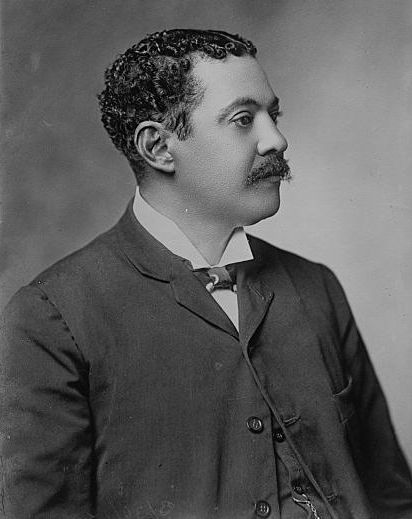
Carlos Antonio Mendoza (National Liberal); 1909–1910

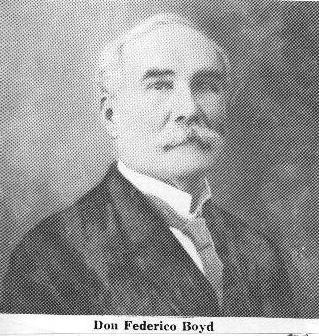
Federico Boyd (National Liberal); 1910

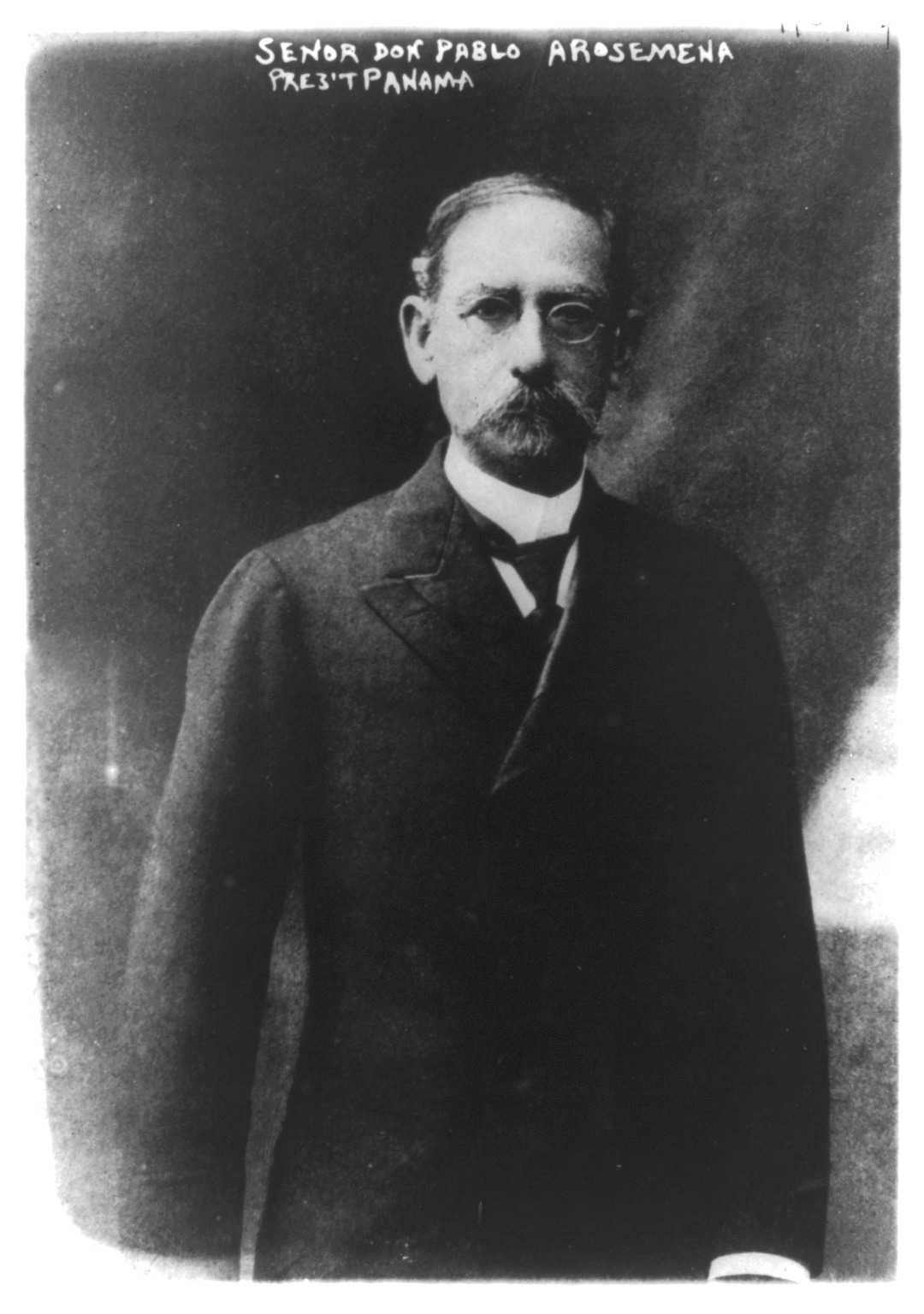
Pablo Arosemena (National Liberal); 1910–1912

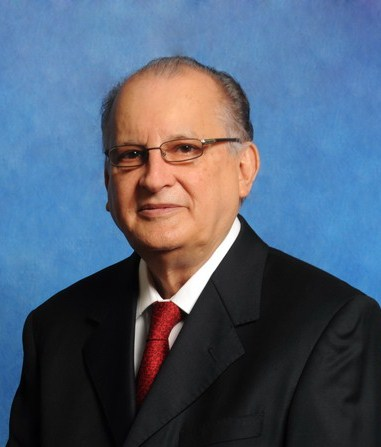
Ricardo de la Espriella (Democratic Revolutionary Party); 1978–1982

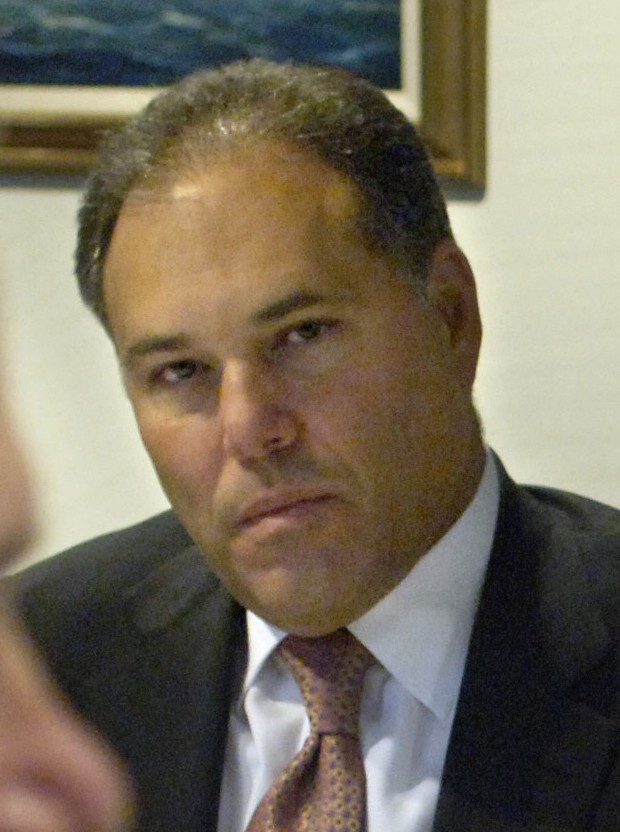
Samuel Lewis Navarro (Democratic Revolutionary Party); 2004–2009

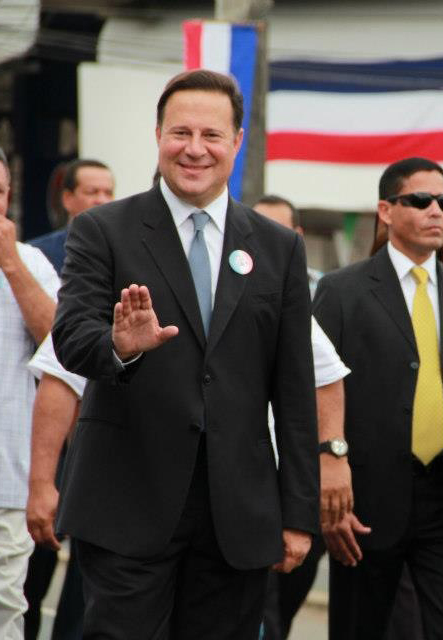
Juan Carlos Varela (Panameñista Party); 2009–2014

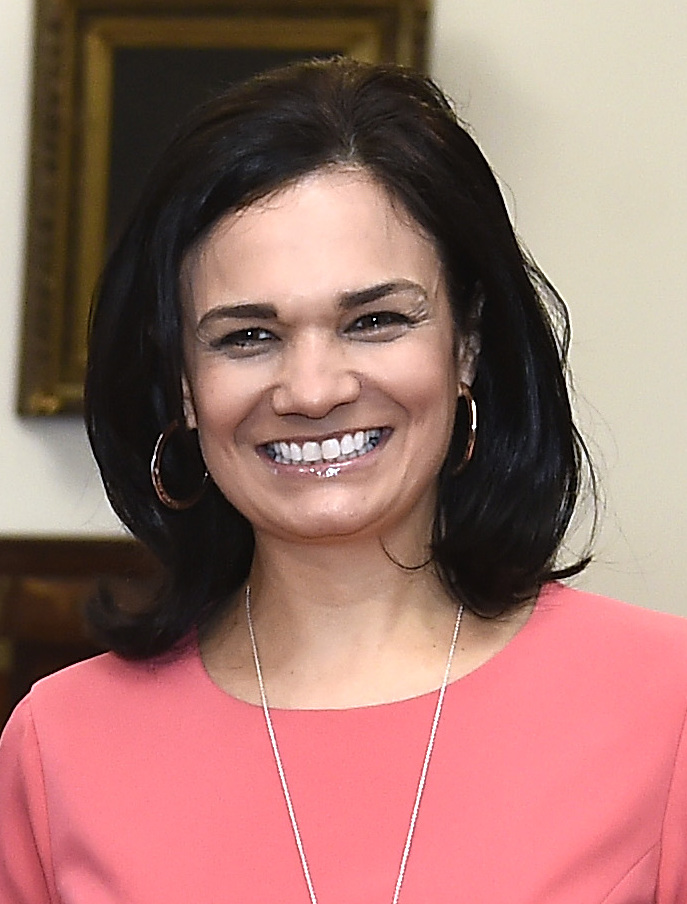
Isabel Saint Malo (Panamá Primero); 2014–2019

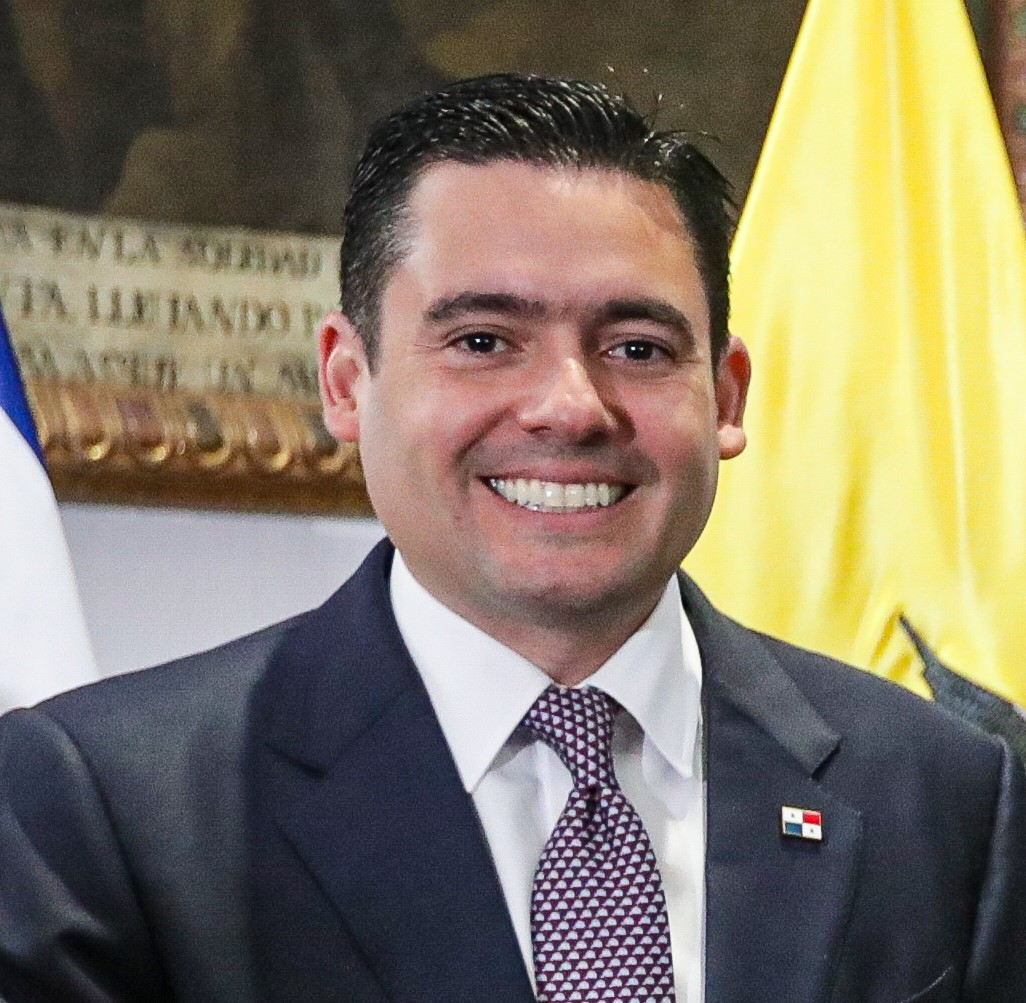
José Gabriel Carrizo (Democratic Revolutionary Party); 2019–2024

== See also ==
- List of current vice presidents
