= Daniel Chanis Pinzón =

President of Panama

Daniel Chanis

President of Panama
- In office 28 July 1949 – 20 November 1949
- Vice President: Roberto Chiari
- Preceded by: Domingo Díaz Arosemena
- Succeeded by: Roberto Chiari

Vice President of Panama
- In office 1948–1949
- Preceded by: Ernesto de la Guardia
- Succeeded by: Roberto Chiari

Personal details
- Born: 20 November 1892 Panama City, Panama
- Died: January 22, 1961 (aged 68) Panama City, Panama
- Party: Liberal Party
- Occupation: Physician

Daniel Chanis Pinzón (20 November 1892 – 22 January 1961) was a Panamanian politician and physician. As First Vice President of Domingo Díaz Arosemena, he became President of Panama on July 28, 1949, and served until November 20, 1949, when he was forcibly ousted by police chief José ("Chichi") Remón. He was succeeded by Díaz Arosemena's second vice president, Roberto Chiari. He belonged to the Liberal Party.

== Early life ==
Chanis earned his Doctor of Medicine degree from the University of Edinburgh in 1917, practicing medicine in both Panama and Scotland. Chanis published a paper in the American Urological Association's Journal of Urology in 1942 titled "Some Aspects of Hermaphroditism: Report of a Case of Female Pseudohermaphroditism" in 1942. He also served as General Council of Panama in Liverpool and London, and as treasury minister.

== First vice-president ==
National police forces, under the command of Remón, were called in ostensibly to maintain the monitor the elections, though in reality their presence was intended to sway the voting to Diaz Arosemena, the preferred candidate of the United States. Chanis ran as the first vice-presidential candidate with Díaz Arosemena. Though Arias appeared to have 1,500 more votes than Díaz Arosemena following the May 9 election, the Panamanian national elections jury declared Díaz Arosemena the winner on August 6 by a margin of approximately 2,400 votes. Arias fled to Costa Rica following the decision. Chanis assumed the duties of first vice-president on October 1, 1948.

== President ==
Chanis was sworn in as acting chief executive on July 28, 1949, when then president Domingo Diaz Arosemena took a six-month leave for health reasons. Chanis became president following Arosemena's death on August 23, 1949.

== 1949 coup d'état ==
Chanis's presidency came to an end on November 20, 1949. Panamanian Police Chief José Remón led a coup d'état in response to Chanis's refusal to overturn a Panama Supreme Court decision invalidating a contract between an abattoir that was "part of Remón's business empire" and several powerful Panamanian families. Chanis had asked for Remón's resignation previously, and, when Remón refused, tendered his own resignation in protest. Whether this resignation was voluntary or forced by Remón is unclear, although it would appear that foreign diplomatic pressure, not wanting to see full out bloodshed, encouraged the resignation. Chanis was replaced by Second Vice-president, and Remón's cousin, Roberto Chiari.

== Coup aftermath ==
Shortly after his resignation, Chanis had a change of heart and withdrew his resignation, claiming it came under duress, and delivered a "blistering attack" on Remón before the General Assembly. The Assembly, at the behest of former president Harmodio Arias, supported Chanis, and prepared for confrontation with the national police. Chiari forced his hand, however, and demanded the Panama Supreme Court rule on who, he or Chanis, was the constitutional president; the Supreme Court came back in favor of Chanis by a 4–1 vote. This misstep, and his desire to avoid violence, led Remón to replace him with his former "bitter political enemy" Arnulfo Arias, with the approval of the Panama Congress. To legitimize the presidency, the national election jury, who had in 1948 ruled against Arias, " found pro-Arias votes it had been unable to find in weeks after the 1948 balloting".

Political offices
Preceded by Ernesto de la Guardia	First Vice President of Panama; 1948–1949	Succeeded by Roberto Chiari
Preceded by Domingo Díaz Arosemena	President of Panama; July 1949 – November 1949	Succeeded by Roberto Chiari
