= Heraclio Barletta =

Heraclio Barletta (Heraclio Barletta Bustamente) (June 10, 1915 – December 31, 1959) was Second Vice President of Panama from 1956 to 1959 under President Ernesto de la Guardia and First Vice President Temistocles Díaz.

Born in Guarare, Los Santos, Panama, Heraclio Barletta died on New Year's Eve, December 31, 1959. While driving through the mountains in an undeveloped area outside of Panama City he was on foot helping a logging truck navigate a sharp corner. Several logs fell from the truck killing him and leaving one of his younger brothers Jose Ramos almost dead.

Photo from Getty Images. Barletta is on the right

Political offices
| Preceded by Vacant | Second Vice President of Panama; 1956–1959 | Succeeded by José Dominador Bazán |
