= Florencio Harmodio Arosemena =

President of Panama from 1928 to 1931

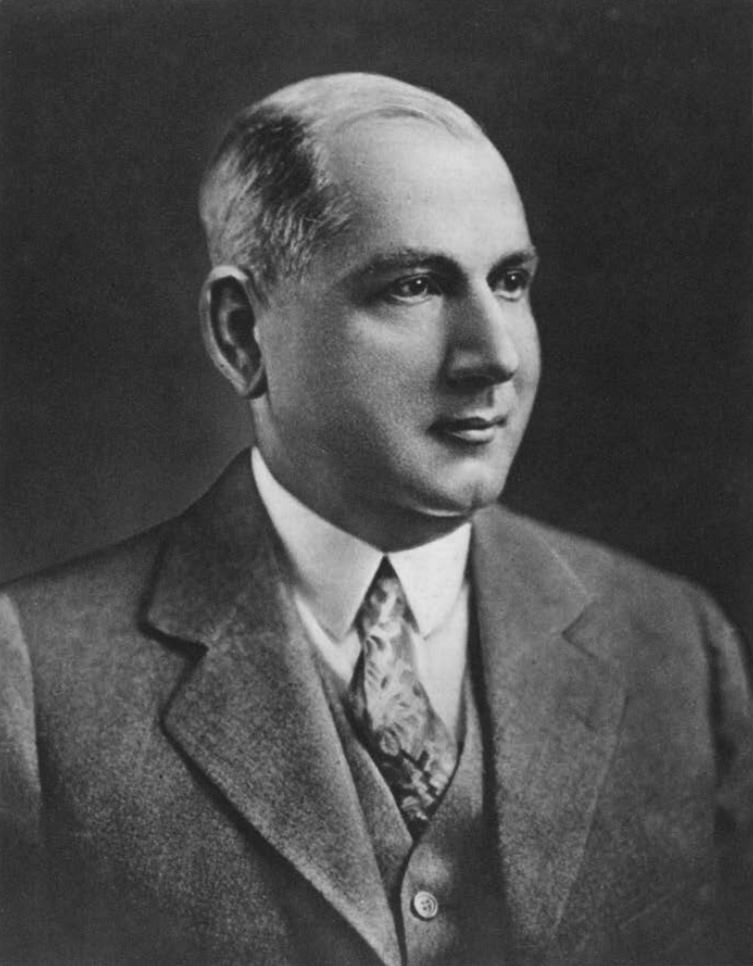

President of Panama
- In office 1 October 1928 – 3 January 1931
- Deputy: Presidential designates Ricardo Alfaro; Carlos Laureano López; Eduardo Chiari; Tomás Gabriel Duque; Carlos Laureano López; Enrique Linares
- Preceded by: Rodolfo Chiari
- Succeeded by: Harmodio Arias Madrid

Personal details
- Born: Florencio Harmodio Arosemena Guillén

Florencio Harmodio Arosemena Guillén (17 September 1872 – 30 August 1945) was the 6th President of Panama from October 1, 1928, to January 3, 1931. He belonged to the Liberal Party.

== Biography ==
He was born in Panama City, then part of Colombia on September 17, 1872, son of Florencio Arosemena De Alba and of Clara Guillén.

At the early age of 11, he was sent to study in Germany by his father. Arosemena became an accomplished civil engineer who graduated from the University of Heidelberg, Germany in 1895.

He spoke seven languages (Spanish, English, German, Turkish, French, Italian, and Portuguese) and was a lifelong friend of physicist Albert Einstein, with whom he had attended university in Germany. He worked with the German Government in the construction of various railroads in countries such as Portugal and Turkey. Later Cuba hired him for the construction of its Central Railroad.

He assisted in 1895 with the design and construction of the railroad line from Guayaquil to Quito - the most difficult railroad of the world to be built at the time, that was called "the nose of the devil", when Eloy Alfaro was president of Ecuador. Among his other notable contributions of architectural and engineering projects in Panama are; the Palace of Government, the National Institute of Panama, the National Theater and Panama city hall, the Puerto Armuelles Railroad and the plans of the Neighborhood of the Exposition that harbors among others monuments of the National Institute Gorgas.

As a member of the Liberal Party; he was elected President of the Republic of Panama by popular election, during a period of serious economic difficulties, he served as president from October 1, 1928, until January 3, 1931; Acción Communal, who would later lead a coup d'etat against him, accused him of committing election fraud and corruption. His presidency focused on public works and reduction of government spending. His attempt to do so by reducing government salaries in 1928 resulted in their restoration the following year, ultimately causing a deficit in 1930. This period lasted until January 2, 1931, when Arnulfo Arias Madrid led the Acción Comunal Coup and his older brother Harmodio Arias Madrid assumed the presidency. He died on 30 August 1945.

Political offices
Preceded by Rodolfo Chiari	President of Panama; 1928–1931	Succeeded by Harmodio Arias
