= Ezequiel Fernández (Panamanian politician) =

Panamanian politician

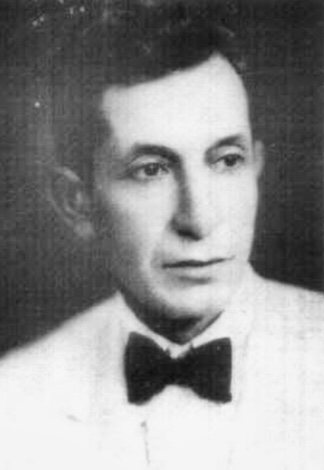

Acting President of Panama
- In office 16 December 1939 – 18 December 1939
- Preceded by: Juan Demóstenes Arosemena
- Succeeded by: Augusto Samuel Boyd

Personal details
- Born: Ezequiel Fernández Jaén; 3 March 1886 Penonomé, Coclé
- Died: 26 March 1946 (aged 60)

Ezequiel Fernández Jaén (3 March 1886 – 26 March 1946) was one of Panama's presidential designates from 1936 to 1940 and in that capacity also served as acting President of Panama from 16 December 1939, to 18 December 1939. He belonged to the National Revolutionary Party (PNR), acting as president and "Supreme Leader" of the party, until in 1940, Arnulfo Arias Madrid, became President of Panama.

He was elected as the third presidential designate by the National Assembly for the term 1936–1938, and as the second presidential designate for the term 1938–1940.

Fernández's three-day rule is the shortest term ever served by a President of Panama.

With former President Harmodio Arias Madrid, he was the founder, architect, and for several years, main leader, of the National Revolutionary Party (PNR), until for health reasons he stepped down in 1940 after organizing the party for Arnulfo Arias Madrid. Ezequiel Fernández Jaén was succeeded as leader and President of the party by Arnulfo Arias Madrid, who became President of Panamá in 1940. Fernandez remained leader of the party until Arnulfo Arias Madrid won the election. Then, President Arnulfo Arias Madrid, appointed him as the Panamanian Ambassador to Costa Rica where he negotiated the Echandi-Fernández Jaén Treaty, ending a long border controversy that led both countries to war (the Coto War). Over the years, the National Revolutionary Party became the Arnulfista Party and the Panameñista Party, and Fernández Jaén s' historical relevance was diminished by Arnulfo Arias Madrid. Fernández Jaén acted as judge, Supreme Court judge and also as cabinet Government and Justice Secretary. He had eight children from his first marriage. After his first wife died, he remarried (with Zoila Adela Moré Ochoa) and had three other children. He was also father of one other son.

Political offices
Preceded by Juan Demóstenes Arosemena	President of Panama; 16 December 1939–18 December 1939	Succeeded by Augusto Samuel Boyd
