= Gladys de la Lastra =

Panamanian composer

- Gladys de la Lastra
- Born: 6 March 1932; Penonomé
- Died: 28 September 2005 (aged 73); Panama City
- Occupation: Musician

Gladys de la Lastra (Penonomé, 6 March 1932 – Panama City, 28 September 2005) was a drummer, composer and musician from Panama.

== Biography ==
De la Lastra was born on March 6, 1932, in Penonomé. She studied at the Simeón Conte School and then studied at the National Institute of Panama for her secondary schooling. She went on to study at the National Institute of Music. After graduating, de la Lastra taught music at the State of Israel and Old Panama School.

De la Lastra's first composition was "La Princesa del Zaratí", which was composed in a bolero-style for the centenary of Coclé, when she was 17 years old. This song highlighted national values. De la Lastra believed that her musical ability was a gift from god. Religious and nationalist themes were found throughout her work and she was a member of the Trade Union of Art Workers of Panama (SITAP).

De la Lastra died on September 28, 2005, and was hailed as a national hero. Her coffin was pulled by white horses through the streets of Penonomé, which were lined with people.

== Music ==
Little Panama, I love you beautiful country Little piece of land that God gave me

My Panamanian blood is a warming fire That ignites joy to the heart where I go.

— Panama Chiquita (translation)

De la Lastra is famous for her guitar-playing and drumming. She wrote many songs throughout a long career, some of which include:

- Romance Salinero
- If the Treaty
- Bolívar American Hero
- Portobelo
- Already Enter the Canal Zone
- Summer Dreams
- Sovereignty
- Chiriquí Grande
- My Penonomé
- Cristiano the Church is You
- A Santa Ana
- Victoriano Lorenzo
- El Proyecto del Bayano
- Ingenio La Victoria
- La Guerra del Banano
- Panama Chiquita (one of the last pieces she composed)

De la Lastra composed over 200 songs during her career, as well as anthems for the University of Panama and for the Centenary of the Republic of Panama.

== Awards ==
1949 – Medal of Honour awarded by the Municipal Council of Penonomé

1960 – Coclé's Favourite Daughter

1961 – Anayansi Award for Publicity Interamericana for the composition Panama Soberana

1981 – Commander of the Order Belisario Porras

1981 – First Prize at the Festival of the Mediterranean and Latin American Tourist Song, held in Estoril (Portugal), the 'Golden Caravel' trophy for the song The Drummer I Have

1996 – Intellectual Woman of the Year selected by the Circle of Intellectual Women of Panama (CIMIP)

2005 – Order of Vasco Núñez de Balboa

== Legacy ==
The Gladys de la Lastra Festival has been held annually since 2013 in Penonomé and is dedicated to the work of the singer. After her death, the mayor Agustín Méndez, hoped to erect a statue and name a street after her. Every November 3rd, schools across Panama sing her song La Angoustoura.

== de la Lastra in the Media ==
- De la Lastra "Megamix"
- Funeral of Gladys de la Lastra
- 'Gladys de la Lastra'
