= Labor Party (Panama) =

The Labor Party (Spanish: Partido Laborista) was a Panamanian political party.

The initiative to launch the Labor Party began in 1927. Founders of the party included Diógenes de la Rosa, Don Cristóbal Segundo and Domingo H. Turner. The party obtained some 1,000 votes in the 1928 general election.

In 1929 the party sent a delegation to the 1st Conference of the Communist Parties of Latin America, at which it announced its publication El Mazo ('The Mallet'). The delegates of the party were Eugenio Cossani and Jacinto Chacón. At the conference, the party presented itself as 'partly communist'. In August 1929 the party protested against the raising of a bust of US president Theodore Roosevelt in Colón, citing that the monument hurt the 'national dignity' of Panama.

The successor organization of the Labor Party, the Communist Party of Panama (Partido Communista de Panamá, PCP), was officially established in 1930. Whilst Segundo and Turner became Communist Party leaders, De la Rosa did not join the new party and drifted in a Trotskyist direction.
