= Iuming C. Suez =

Chinese diplomat (1881–1940)

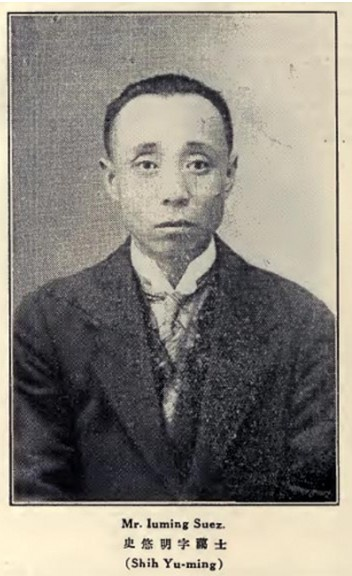
- Born: 1881; Yinzhou, Ningbo
- Died: 1940

Shih Yu-ming (Chinese: 史悠明; pinyin: Shǐ Yōumíng; 1881–1940), courtesy name Aishi (Chinese: 蔼士), better known as Iuming C. Suez was a diplomat of the Republic of China.

== Biography ==
Shih was born in Ningbo in 1881. When he was young, he attended Church Missionary Society Day School in his hometown. He studied traditional Chinese classics with a private school teacher for three years. In 1893, Shi Youming entered Shanghai's Anglo-Chinese College and studied there for half a year. He then transferred to English High School in the same city. In 1895, Shi Youming entered Shanghai St. John's University and graduated in February 1901.

After graduation, Shih served as Headmaster of the Chinese Polytechnic Institution, Shanghai for two years. In 1903, he served as translator and Chief Chinese Clerk of the Shanghai Municipal Council and resigned after seven years. From 1910 to 1911, Shih was engaged in business. In the autumn of 1911, Shih became the English secretary and supervisor of the Posts and Telegraphs at Gyangtse. Later, he was promoted to Chinese trade agent of Gyangtse and concurrently served as supervisor of Gyangtse Trade Mart. A few months later, the local Han garrison mutinied. Then the Revolution of 1911 broke out in mainland China and eventually the Republic of China was established. Through Shih, the local Han rebels who had ceased their rebellion were sent back to the lands of the Han Chinese. Shih became the last person to leave the Tibetan outpost. Shih's experience in Tibet became the most exciting period in his personal life, and he established good relationships with many British trade agents.

After leaving Tibet, Shih went to Kalimpong in East Bengal, British India, to perform a special mission. Before the Simla Convention in 1913, Shih was recalled back to Beijing and transferred to the Ministry of Foreign Affairs of the Beiyang government. Ren Qianshi, Acting Section Chief of the Boundary Affairs Section under the Department of Administrative Affairs of the Ministry of Foreign Affairs. In 1918, Shi Youming also served as a judge of the Jiangsu Capture Inspection and Inspection Office (Shanghai) (Shanghai Prize Court). In March 1918, American engineer George A. Kyle of the Zhouxiang (Zhoujiakou-Xiangyang) Railway and others were kidnapped by bandits in Ye County, Henan. Shih and Charles Daniel Tenney represented the Ministry of Foreign Affairs and the U.S. government and were responsible for rescue, securing the release of American engineers and others. In July 1919, Shi Youming was awarded the Order of the Precious Brilliant Golden Grain, fourth-class. In August 1919, Shih was appointed as a member of the Diplomatic and Consular Service Commission.

In June 1920, Shih was appointed Consul-General New York City. In December 1921, he was appointed as the charge d'affaires of the Chinese Embassy in Panama. In April 1922, he was appointed Consul-General of China in Panama. In November 1922, he was appointed first secretary of the Chinese Embassy in Panama, and still served as charge d'affaires and consul-general. In August 1923, he was appointed first secretary of the Chinese Embassy in Peru and concurrently served as charge d'affaires.

In the 1930s, Shih served as a salt official in Qaidam, Qinghai, a member of the National Coal Relief Committee of the Ministry of Industry of the National Government, and an agent of the Preparatory Office of China Kerosene Exploration Company, working with Huang Jiqing and American experts. In July 1937, at the invitation of his old friend Gu Weijun (then Chinese Ambassador to France), Shih became the captain of the Northwest Geological and Mineral Exploration Team. The team conducted the first systematic investigation of the oil resources in northwest China, which led to the development of the Yumen Oilfield led by Weng Wenhao.

Political offices
Preceded by Yang Shuwen	Consul General of the Republic of China in Panama; November 1921–December 1921	Succeeded by Position abolished
Preceded by Position established	Minister of the Republic of China in Panama; December 1921–August 1923	Succeeded by Phillip Tyau
Preceded by Lo Tsung-yee	Minister of the Republic of China in Peru; August 1923–July 1926	Succeeded by Shi Zhaoxiang
