= National Institute of Panama =

Coordinates: 8°57′27.3″N 79°32′34.6″W

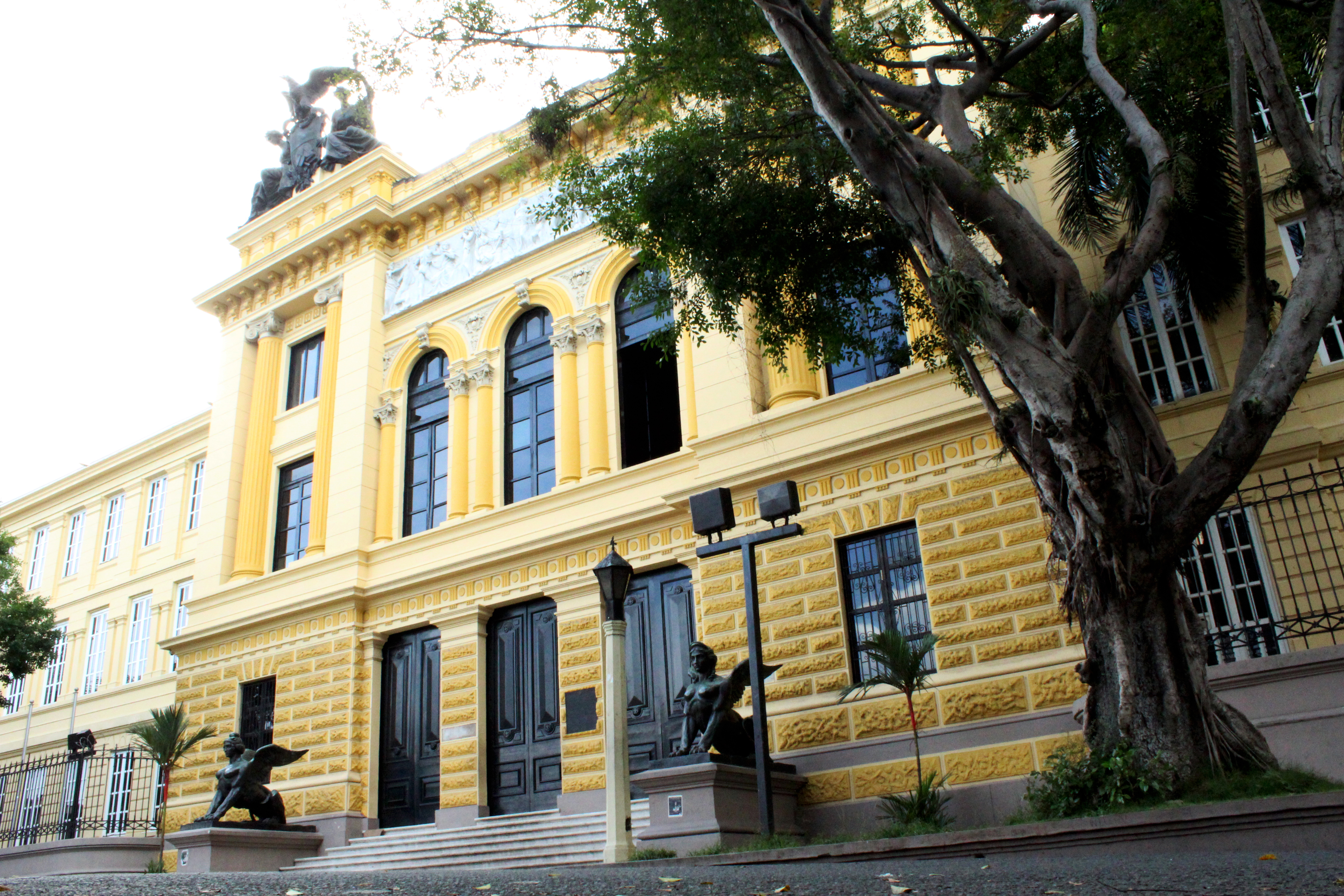
National Institute of Panama

The National Institute of Panama (Spanish: Instituto Nacional de Panamá) is a school in Panama located in the district of Santa Ana in Panama City. It was the first school in Panama to offer higher education courses on its premises. Established by law on June 1, 1907, by Panama's president Manuel Amador Guerrero, it opened on April 25, 1909, in the facilities of the current Manuel José Hurtado School while construction of its own building was in progress. The engineer and Panama's future president Florencio Harmodio Arosemena constructed the school which was completed in May 1911.

== Notable alumni ==
- Gonzalo Brenes, composer, politician, music educator, and musicologist
- Gladys de la Lastra, composer and percussionist

== Bibliography ==
- Aguirre Castillo, Carlos (2013). "Origen del Instituto Nacional y su trascendencia histórica antes y después del 9 de enero de 1964" (PDF). Revista Lotería. 0024-662X (523): 6–13.
- Gutiérrez, Samuel A. "Arquitectura panameña" (PDF). Arquitectura y profesionales durante los primeros años republicanos: 251–303.
