= Augusto Samuel Boyd =

President of Panama (1879–1957)

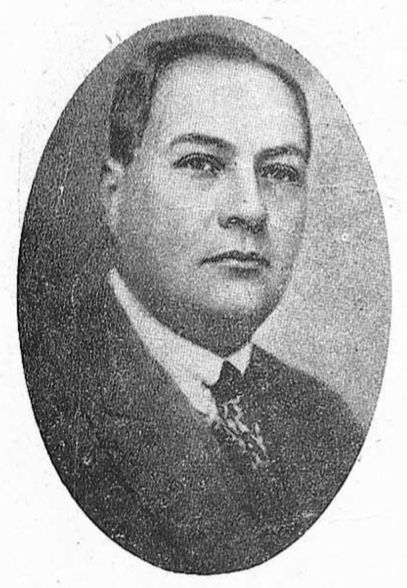

President of Panama
- In office 18 December 1939 – 1 October 1940
- Deputy: Presidential designates Ezequiel Fernández; Jacinto López y L.
- Preceded by: Ezequiel Fernández
- Succeeded by: Arnulfo Arias

Personal details
- Born: Augusto Samuel Boyd Briceño

Augusto Samuel Boyd Briceño (1 August 1879 – 17 June 1957) was a politician from Panama.

== Background ==
He was elected as the first presidential designate by the National Assembly for the terms 1936–1938 and 1938–1940. In that capacity he became President of Panama when Juan Demóstenes Arosemena died in December 1939. He served until 1 October 1940.

During his government, the Transisthmian Highway, a highway that crossed the Isthmus of Panama and linked Panama City with Colón, was inaugurated. This road was known as the "Boyd-Roosevelt Highway" in honor of the Presidents of Panama and the United States.

He belonged to the National Revolutionary Party (PNR).

Political offices
Preceded by Ezequiel Fernández	President of Panama; 1939–1940	Succeeded by Arnulfo Arias
