= Juan Demóstenes Arosemena =

President of Panama (1879–1939)

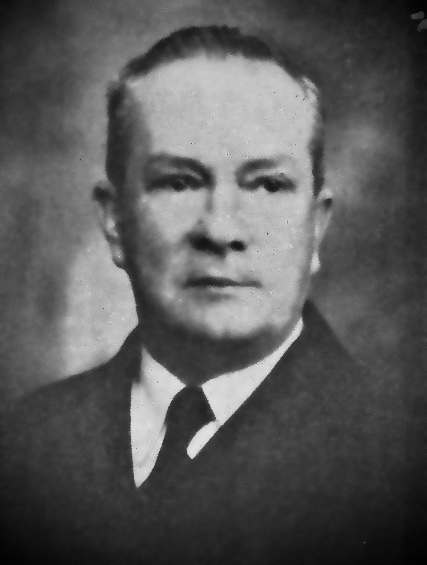

President of Panama
- In office 1 October 1936 – 16 December 1939
- Deputy: Presidential designates Augusto Samuel Boyd; Héctor Valdés; Ezequiel Fernández; Jacinto López y L.
- Preceded by: Harmodio Arias Madrid
- Succeeded by: Ezequiel Fernández

Personal details
- Born: Juan Demóstenes Arosemena Barreati; 24 June 1879 Panama City
- Died: 16 December 1939 (aged 60) Penonomé

Juan Demóstenes Arosemena Barreati (24 June 1879 – 16 December 1939) was President of Panama from October 1, 1936, to December 16, 1939. He belonged to the National Liberal Party. His Vice-presidents were the conservative Augusto Samuel Boyd and Ezequiel Fernández Jaén, the maximum leader and founder of the National Revolutionary Party (today Panameñista Party). He died being President of the Republic of Panamá and was briefly succeeded by Ezequiel Fernández Jaén who was his second vice-president while the first one, Augusto Samuel Boyd, left Washington where he was acting as Panamanian ambassador, came to Panamá.

Juan Demostenes Arosemena's presidency dedicated most of his efforts to promote education and health.

His brother-in-law Alcibíades Arosemena later served as president from 1951 to 1952.

Political offices
Preceded by Harmodio Arias	President of Panama; 1936–1939	Succeeded by Ezequiel Fernández
