= Wanquan, Zhejiang =

Wanquan 万全镇
- Town
- Location in Zhejiang
- Coordinates: 27.7215°N 120.6061°E
- Country: People's Republic of China
- Province: Zhejiang
- Prefecture-level city: Wenzhou
- County: Pingyang County
- Time zone: UTC+8 (China Standard)

Wanquan (simplified Chinese: 万全; traditional Chinese: 萬全; pinyin: Wànquán) is a town under the administration of Pingyang County, Zhejiang, China. As of 2018, it has four residential communities, 62 villages, and two special farming communities under its administration.
