= Ricardo Adolfo de la Guardia =

President of Panama from 1941 to 1945

Ricardo de la Guardia
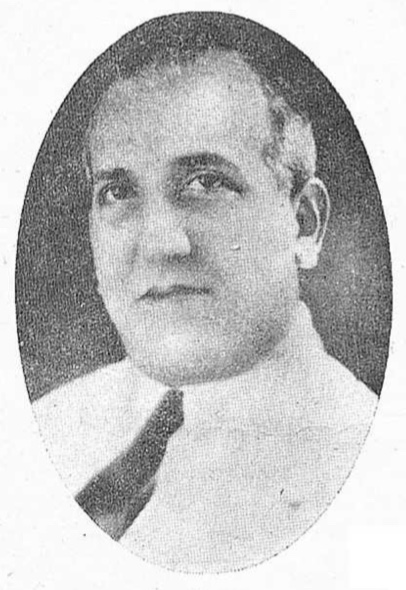

President of Panama
- In office 9 October 1941 – 15 June 1945
- Deputy: Presidential designates (1941); José Pezet Arosemena; Aníbal Ríos Delgado; Presidential designates (1945); Jeptha Brawner Duncan; Miguel Ángel Grimaldo; Alcibíades Arosemena
- Preceded by: Arnulfo Arias
- Succeeded by: Enrique Adolfo Jiménez

Personal details
- Born: Ricardo Adolfo de la Guardia Arango; 4 March 1899 Panama Department, Colombia (now Panama)
- Died: 29 December 1969 (aged 70) Panama
- Political party: Independent
- Spouse: Carmen Estripeaut de la Guardia

Ricardo Adolfo de la Guardia Arango (14 March 1899 – 29 December 1969) was the 11th President of Panama from 9 October 1941 to 15 June 1945, during World War II. He also served as governor of Panamá Province from 1936 to 1938. His government was the first Latin American government to declare war on the Axis powers following the attack on Pearl Harbor, and he allowed the United States to lease military bases across the country.

Political offices
Preceded by Arnulfo Arias	President of Panama; 1941–1945	Succeeded by Enrique Adolfo Jiménez
