= Unionist Center Party =

Defunct Panamanian political party

The Unionist Center Party (in Spanish: Partido Centro Unionista, PCU) was a Panamanian small regionalist conservative political party.

The party was active in Los Santos Province in the 1920s and 1940s. The PA was represented in the Panamian Parliament from 1932 to 1936. José Evaristo Mora P. was the founder and leader of the PCU.
