= Workers' Republican Party =

The Workers' Republican Party (Spanish: Partido Republicano Obrero, PRO) was a Panamanian small regionalist centrist political party.

The party was active in Panamá Province in the 1920s and 1940s. In 1928 it allied with the Porrista National Coalition (CNP) and its candidate Jorge Eduardo Boyd, but it remained without parliamentary representation.

Rubén O. Miró, Elias Ramos Márquez and Leonor A. González S. were the founders and leaders of the Party.
