= Pingyang County =

Pingyang 平阳县
- County
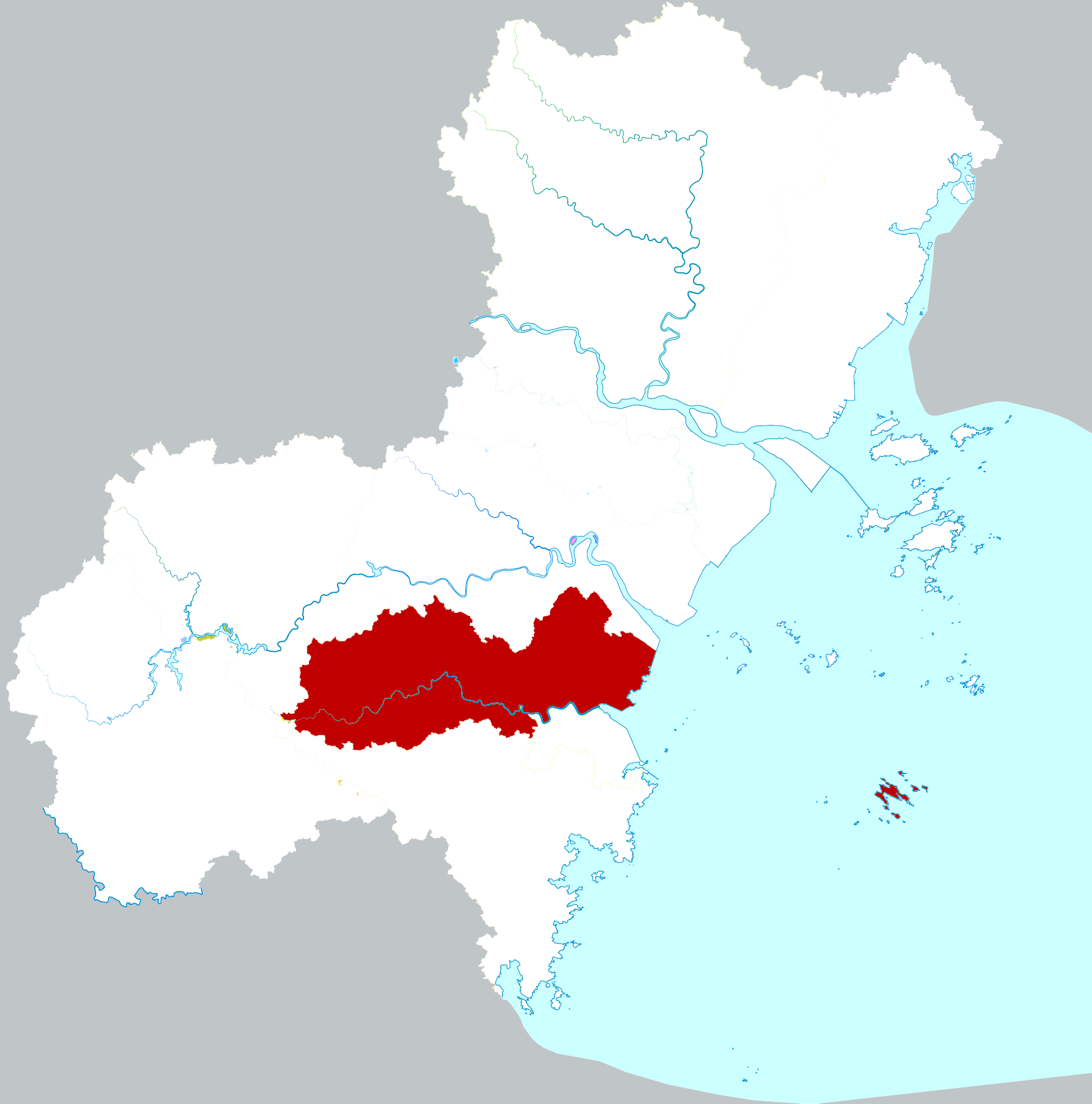
- Location of Pingyang in Wenzhou

- Location of the seat in Zhejiang
- Coordinates: 27°39′43″N 120°33′57″E
- Country: People's Republic of China
- Province: Zhejiang
- Prefecture-level city: Wenzhou

Area
  - Total: 1,042.21 km^{2} (402.40 sq mi)

Population (2020)
  - Total: 878,700
  - Density: 843.1/km^{2} (2,184/sq mi)
- Time zone: UTC+8 (China Standard)

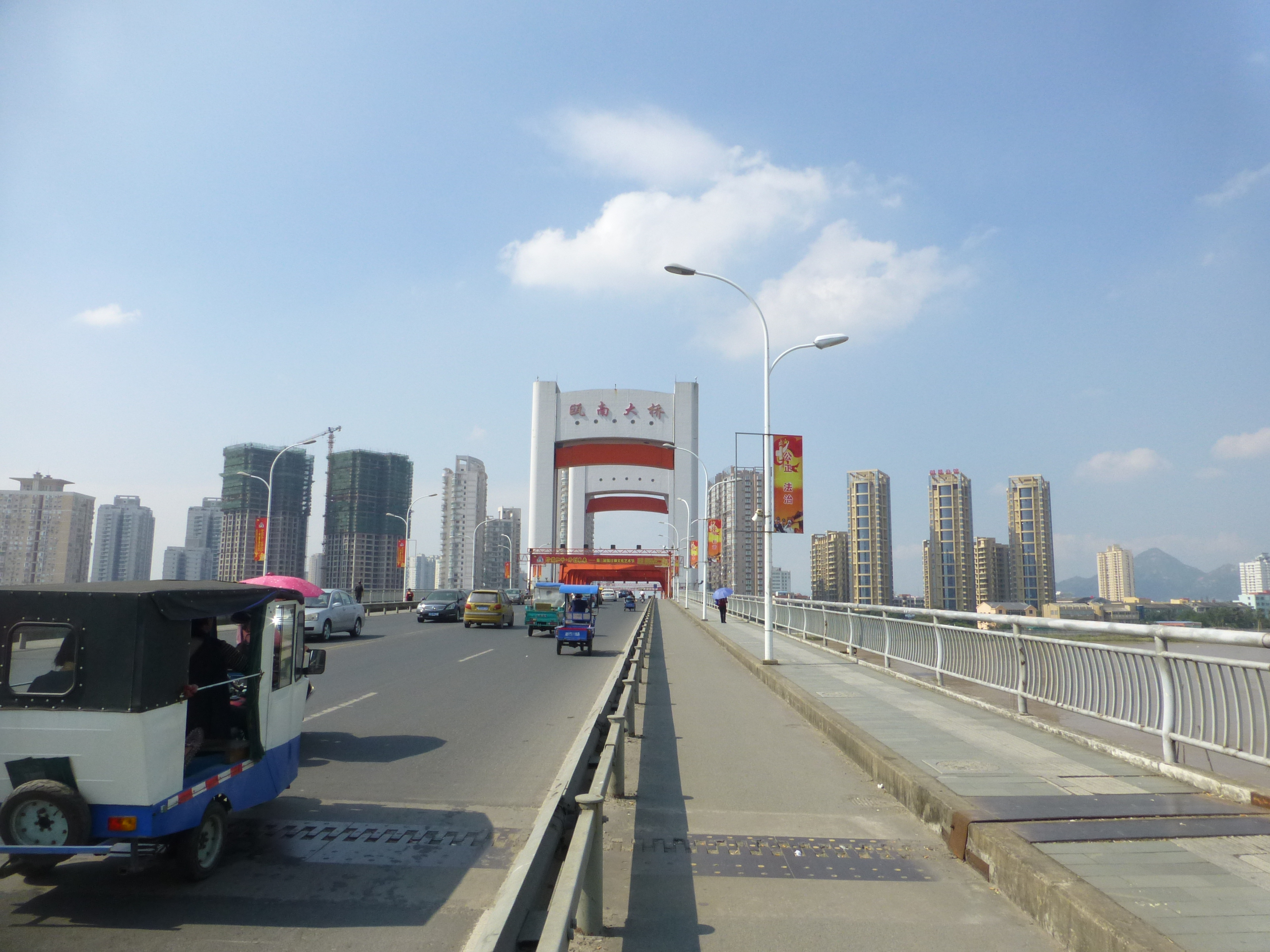

Pingyang County (simplified Chinese: 平阳县; traditional Chinese: 平陽縣; pinyin: Píngyáng Xiàn, Wenzhounese:ben yi) is a county in the prefecture-level city of Wenzhou, located along the southern coast of Zhejiang province, China. There are two main cities with many surrounding villages in Pingyang. The two main settlements are called Aojiang and Kunyang (Kunyang is commonly called Pingyang, however Pingyang is also the name of the county). Aojiang is located ten minutes outside of Kunyang. Various villages and areas also classified under Pingyang County extend for about a one-hour radius.

== Administrative divisions ==
Towns:

- Kunyang (昆阳镇), Aojiang (鳌江镇), Shuitou (水头镇), Xiaojiang (萧江镇), Tengjiao (腾蛟镇), Wanquan (万全镇), Mabu (麻步镇), Shunxi (顺溪镇), Shanmen (山门镇), Nanyan (南雁镇)

The only township is Qingjie She Ethnic Township (青街畲族乡). Pingyang county also administrates the popular local tourist destination, Nanji Island (南麂岛).

== Climate ==
Climate data for Pingyang, elevation 5 m (16 ft), (1991–2020 normals, extremes 1956–present)
Month	Jan	Feb	Mar	Apr	May	Jun	Jul	Aug	Sep	Oct	Nov	Dec	Year
Record high °C (°F)	23.2 (73.8)	27.5 (81.5)	30.8 (87.4)	32.7 (90.9)	35.7 (96.3)	38.5 (101.3)	40.4 (104.7)	37.5 (99.5)	36.4 (97.5)	32.6 (90.7)	29.0 (84.2)	25.3 (77.5)	40.4 (104.7)
Mean daily maximum °C (°F)	12.0 (53.6)	13.1 (55.6)	15.9 (60.6)	21.0 (69.8)	25.3 (77.5)	28.7 (83.7)	32.7 (90.9)	32.0 (89.6)	28.8 (83.8)	24.8 (76.6)	20.2 (68.4)	15.1 (59.2)	22.5 (72.4)
Daily mean °C (°F)	8.1 (46.6)	9.2 (48.6)	11.9 (53.4)	16.8 (62.2)	21.4 (70.5)	25.2 (77.4)	28.7 (83.7)	28.4 (83.1)	25.2 (77.4)	20.5 (68.9)	15.8 (60.4)	10.7 (51.3)	18.5 (65.3)
Mean daily minimum °C (°F)	5.2 (41.4)	6.3 (43.3)	9.1 (48.4)	13.8 (56.8)	18.5 (65.3)	22.4 (72.3)	25.4 (77.7)	25.4 (77.7)	22.2 (72.0)	16.9 (62.4)	12.3 (54.1)	7.4 (45.3)	15.4 (59.7)
Record low °C (°F)	−5.1 (22.8)	−2.7 (27.1)	−1.9 (28.6)	4.3 (39.7)	10.0 (50.0)	13.4 (56.1)	17.7 (63.9)	20.2 (68.4)	13.7 (56.7)	6.0 (42.8)	0.1 (32.2)	−4.1 (24.6)	−5.1 (22.8)
Average precipitation mm (inches)	68.0 (2.68)	86.9 (3.42)	147.9 (5.82)	140.1 (5.52)	184.6 (7.27)	268.3 (10.56)	198.5 (7.81)	272.8 (10.74)	197.6 (7.78)	85.8 (3.38)	80.8 (3.18)	60.4 (2.38)	1,791.7 (70.54)
Average precipitation days (≥ 0.1 mm)	13.7	14.0	18.4	16.9	17.1	17.7	12.9	15.6	13.1	8.5	10.1	11.0	169
Average snowy days	1.2	0.8	0.3	0	0	0	0	0	0	0	0	0.3	2.6
Average relative humidity (%)	78	80	81	81	83	85	80	81	81	78	78	76	80
Mean monthly sunshine hours	104.8	100.0	107.2	130.3	140.5	140.0	240.8	220.3	178.4	176.0	131.4	127.7	1,797.4
Percentage possible sunshine	32	31	29	34	34	34	57	55	49	50	41	40	41
Source: China Meteorological AdministrationStart of Period of record and all time record low

== Religious Persecution ==
Pingyang made international headlines in March 2017 when local Christian pastor, Huang Yizi was jailed for a year for protesting at the enforced removal of a cross from Pingyang's Salvation church. 50 people were arrested during the protest.
