= Ernesto Tisdel Lefevre =

Panamanian politician

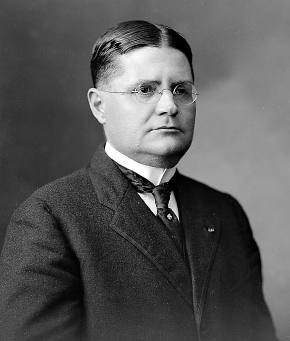

President of Panama
- In office 30 January 1920 – 1 October 1920
- Preceded by: Belisario Porras
- Succeeded by: Belisario Porras

Personal details
- Born: Ernesto Tisdel Lefevre

Ernesto Tisdel Lefevre de la Ossa (1876–1922) was a Panamanian politician.

He was elected as the third presidential designate by the National Assembly for the term 1918-1920. In that capacity he became the President of Panama from January 1920 to October 1920.

Political offices
| Preceded by Belisario Porras | President of Panama; January 1920 – October 1920 | Succeeded by Belisario Porras |
