= Ciro Luis Urriola =

Panamanian politician (1863–1922)

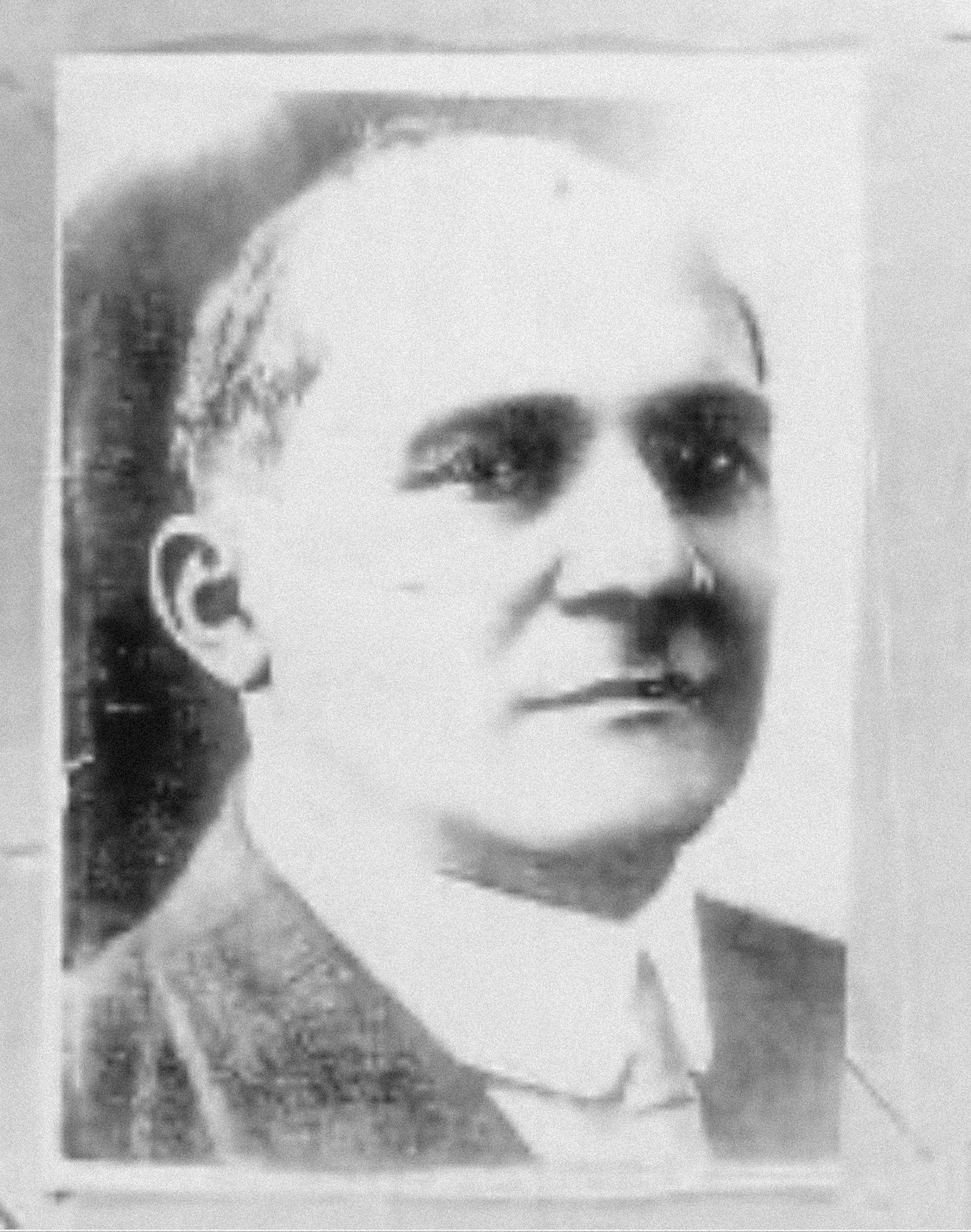

President of Panama
- In office 3 June 1918 – 1 October 1918
- Deputy: Presidential designates Ramón F. Acevedo; Pedro Antonio Díaz; Belisario Porras; Pedro Antonio Díaz; Ernesto Lefevre
- Preceded by: Ramón Maximiliano Valdés
- Succeeded by: Pedro Antonio Díaz

Personal details
- Born: Ciro Luis Urriola Garrés; 3 July 1863 Panama City, Panama State, United States of Colombia
- Died: 26 June 1922 (aged 58) Ancón, Panama Canal Zone
- Party: National Liberal Party
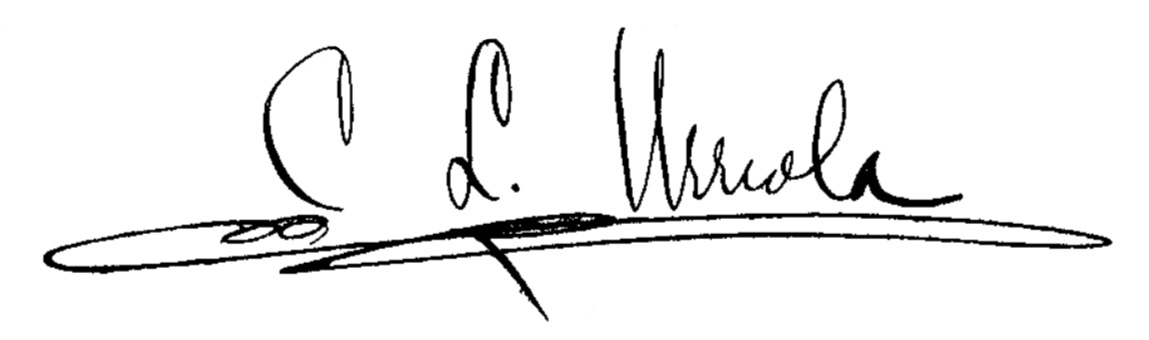
- Signature

Ciro Luis Urriola Garrés (3 July 1863 – 26 June 1922) was a Panamanian politician.

He returned to Panama, then part of Gran Colombia, in 1888 to practice his profession. In 1893 he was in charge of Health Medicine of the Port of Panama for four years. He traveled to Paris and in 1898 he studied bacteriology and nervous diseases. Then he settles down in Dublin where he obtains a diploma in bachelor's degree, which is now obstetrics. He returned to Panama in 1901, in the middle of the thousand-day war, where his adherence to liberalism caused him problems. After independence, he was a member of the National Constituent Convention. In 1903, he was appointed a doctor in the service of policemen and prisoners of the old Hospital Santo Tomás, and since then he has been dedicated to the study of malaria. In 1904 he returned to Paris as a delegate of the Tuberculosis Congress and went to Rome where he studied malaria.

He was elected as the third presidential designate by the National Assembly for the term 1914–1916, and as the first presidential designate for the term 1916–1918.

When President Ramón Maximiliano Valdés died in 1918, Urriola became the President from 3 June 1918 to 1 October 1918.

Political offices
Preceded by Ramón Maximiliano Valdés	President of Panama; June 1918 – October 1918	Succeeded by Pedro Antonio Díaz
