= Pedro Antonio Díaz =

President of Panama (1852–1919)

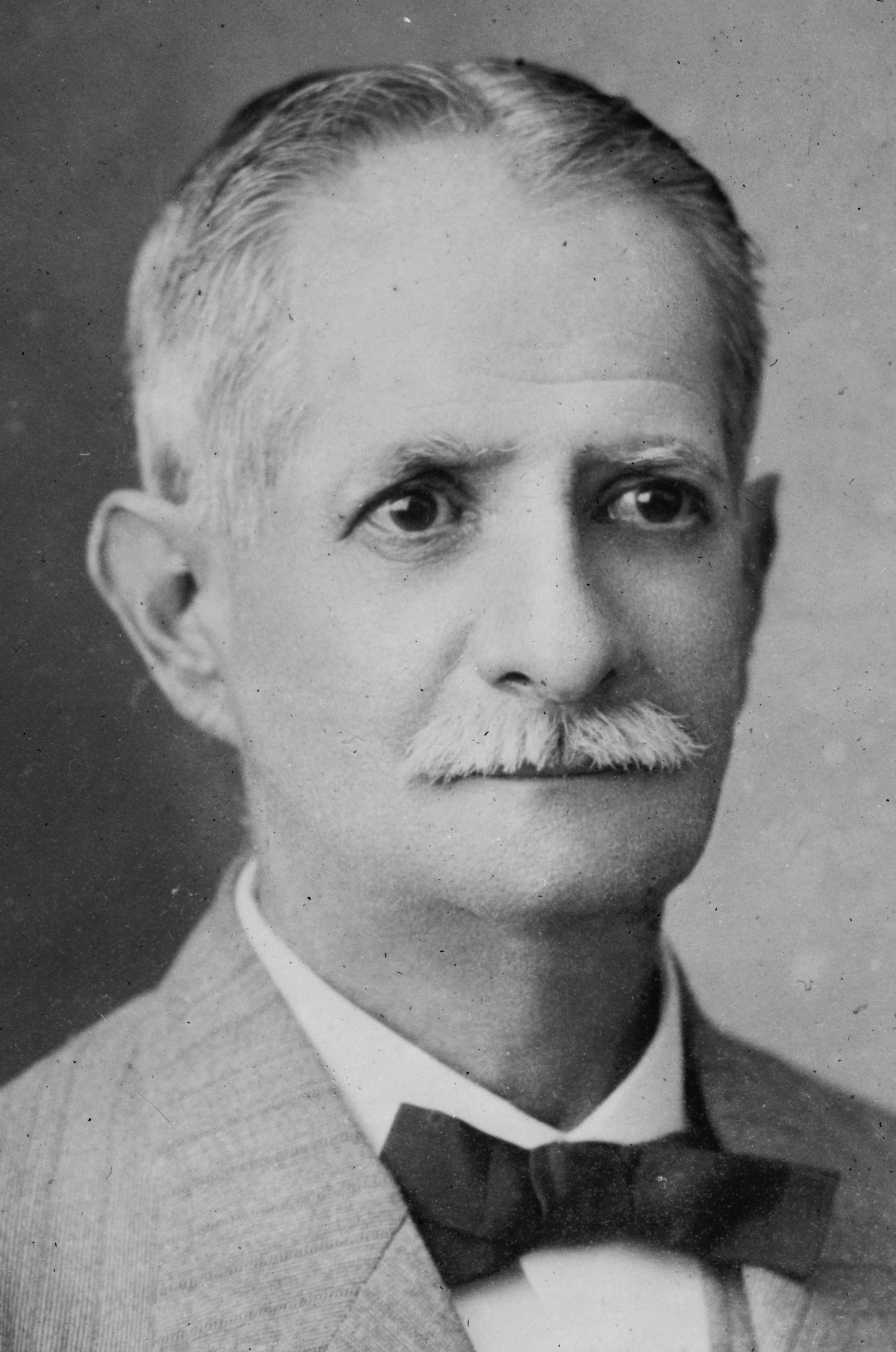

Acting President of Panama
- In office 1 October 1918 – 12 October 1918
- Preceded by: Ciro Luis Urriola
- Succeeded by: Belisario Porras

Personal details
- Born: Pedro Antonio del Carmen Díaz de Obaldía

Pedro Antonio del Carmen Díaz de Obaldía (5 July 1852 – 8 May 1919) was one of the presidential designates of Panama in 1918 and in that capacity also acting President of Panama from 1 October 1918 to 12 October 1918.

He was elected as the third presidential designate by the National Assembly for the term 1916-1918 and as the second presidential designate for the term 1918-1920. He died before completing his term.
