= Ramón Maximiliano Valdés =

President of Panama (1867–1918)

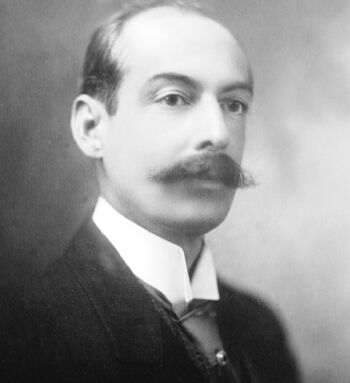

President of Panama
- In office 1 October 1916 – 3 June 1918
- Deputy: Presidential designates Ciro Urriola; Ramón F. Acevedo; Pedro Antonio Díaz
- Preceded by: Belisario Porras
- Succeeded by: Ciro Urriola

Personal details
- Born: Ramón Maximiliano Valdés Arce

Ramón Maximiliano Valdés Arce (13 October 1867 in Penonomé, Coclé – 3 June 1918 in Panama City) was President of Panama from October 1, 1916 to June 3, 1918. He belonged to the Liberal Party. He died in office and was succeeded by the first presidential designate, Ciro Urriola.

He was elected as the second presidential designate by the National Assembly for the term 1912–1914, and as the first presidential designate for the term 1914–1916.

Political offices
Preceded by Belisario Porras	President of Panama; 1916–1918	Succeeded by Ciro Luis Urriola
