= Agrarian Party (Panama) =

Panamanian political party

The Agrarian Party (in Spanish: Partido Agrario, PA) was a Panamanian small regionalist conservative political party. The party was active in Chiriquí Province in the 1920s and 1940s. The PA was represented in the Panamian Parliament from 1928 to 1936.

Carlos V. Biebarach (later a justice of the Supreme Court of Panama) and Manuel C. Díaz Armuelles were the founders and leaders of the Party.
