= Kike Linares =

Filipino footballer

Personal information
- Full name: Enrique Linares Fernández
- Date of birth: 12 July 1999 (age 27)
- Place of birth: Cádiz, Spain
- Height: 1.87 m (6 ft 2 in)
- Position: Centre-back

Team information
- Current team: Chonburi
- Number: 2

Youth career
- 2010–2017: Vázquez Cultural
- 2017–2018: 26 de Febrero

Senior career*
Years	Team	Apps	(Gls)
2018–2019	El Palo	0	(0)
2019–2020	Montijo	10	(0)
2020	Bruno's Magpies	3	(0)
2020–2022	San Pedro	48	(5)
2022–2023	Lamphun Warriors	18	(3)
2023	PSM Makassar	1	(0)
2024–2025	Lamphun Warriors	29	(0)
2025–	Chonburi	4	(0)

International career^{‡}
2022	Philippines U23	4	(0)
2022–	Philippines	12	(1)
- * Club domestic league appearances and goals as of 19 October 2025 ‡ National team caps and goals as of 30 December 2024

Enrique Linares Fernández (born 12 July 1999), commonly known as Kike Linares, is a professional footballer who plays as a centre-back for Thai League 1 club Chonburi. Born in Spain, he plays for the Philippines national team.

== Club career ==
Linares was a youth product of Vázquez Cultural and 26 de Febrero.

=== El Palo ===
Linares joined Tercera División RFEF club El Palo on a season-long deal. He made his league debut for the club in a 0–1 away win against Atarfe Industrial. In February 2019, Linares scored his first professional goal in a 6–0 home win against Torreperogil.

=== Montijo ===
After a season with El Palo, Linares joined Montijo. He made his debut for the club in a 2–1 away defeat against Calamonte.

=== Bruno's Magpies ===
In 2020, Linares joined Gibraltar National League club Bruno's Magpies. He made his debut for the club in a 2–3 away win against Lions Gibraltar.

=== San Pedro ===
After a short stint in Gibraltar, Linares returned to Spain and joined sixth tier División de Honor club San Pedro. He made his debut for the club in a 3–0 home win against Rincón. In May 2021, they have won promotion to Tercera División RFEF.

In 2021–22 season, Linares won the Trofeo Antonio Naranjo – an award given to the best player of San Pedro in a certain season.

=== Lamphun Warriors ===
On 9 July 2022, Linares moved to Southeast Asia to joined Thai League 1 club Lamphun Warriors. He make his debut on 14 August in a goalless draw against Port. On 197 September, Linares scored his first goal for the club against Nakhon Ratchasima equalising for the team in a 2–2 draw. On 22 October, he scored the only goal in the match where he help his team to gained the three points in the league against Nongbua Pitchaya.

=== PSM Makassar ===
In July 2023, Linares moved to Liga 1 club PSM Makassar. He make his debut on 20 October in a league match against Arema.

=== Return to Lamphun Warriors ===
On 8 January 2024, Linares rejoined his former club Lamphun Warriors.

== International career ==
Linares was born in Spain and has Filipino lineage through his grandmother.

=== Philippines U23 ===
In May 2022, Linares was called up to represent the Philippines under-23 in the 31st Southeast Asian Games. He made his debut for Philippines U23 in a 4–0 win against Timor-Leste U23.

=== Philippines ===
In 2019, it was reported that Linares received an invitation to train with the Philippines.

Linares was included in the 25-man squad of the Philippines for 2022 FAS Tri-Nations Series.

He debuted in a 2–0 friendly lost to Malaysia on 23 March 2022.

During the first leg of the 2024 ASEAN Championship semi-finals match on 27 December 2024 against Thailand, Linares scored in the 90+5' stoppage time header, which was also his first international goal, to secure a 2–1 win which saw the Philippines beating Thailand for the first time in 52 years.

== Personal life ==
Linares belongs to a family of footballers. He is cousins with Álvaro Silva, who is also a former Philippines international, Enrique Silva, brother of Álvaro, who played for Malaga B, and Nacho Linares, who currently plays for the U19 team of his former club, Vázquez Cultural.

== Career statistics ==
Scores and results list the Philippines' goal tally first.

#	Date	Venue	Opponent	Score	Result	Competition
1.	27 December 2024	Rizal Memorial Stadium, Manila, Philippines	Thailand	2–1	2–1	2024 ASEAN Championship

== Honours ==
Individual

- Trofeo Antonio Naranjo (San Pedro Player of the Year): 2021–22
