= Ricardo J. Alfaro =

President of Panama 1931–1932

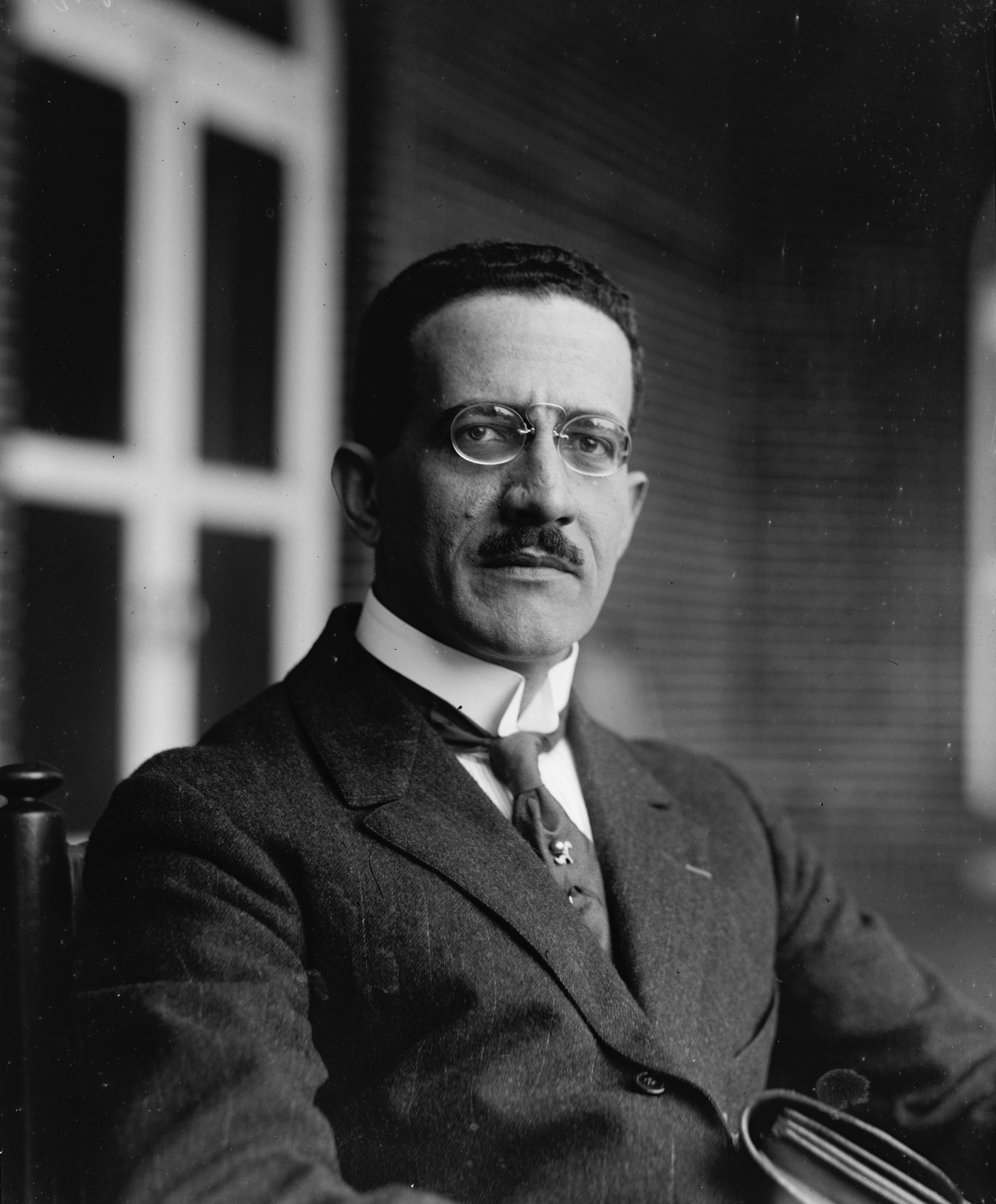

President of Panama
- In office 16 January 1931 – 5 June 1932
- Deputy: Presidential designates Carlos Laureano López; Eduardo Chiari
- Preceded by: Harmodio Arias Madrid
- Succeeded by: Harmodio Arias Madrid

Personal details
- Born: Ricardo Joaquín Alfaro Jované; August 20, 1882 Panama City
- Died: February 23, 1971 (aged 88) Panama City

Ricardo Joaquín Alfaro Jované (August 20, 1882 – February 23, 1971) served as 16th President of Panama from January 16, 1931 to June 5, 1932. He belonged to the Liberal Party.

== Early career ==
Alfaro was born in Panama City in 1882. He began a career in the diplomatic service in 1905 as under-secretary for foreign affairs. He was first assigned to the U.S. in 1912 as legal counselor of the Panamanian legation for the Panama-Costa Rica border dispute. Alfaro was also involved in settling numerous disputes arising from the construction of the Panama Canal. From 1915 to 1918, he was judge of a joint commission between Panama and the United States for settling claims relating to expropriations for the construction of the Canal. Later, in 1934 to 1936 and again, in 1953, Alfaro was involved in critical negotiations relating to Panama–United States relations concerning the Canal.

From 1922 to 1930, and from 1933 to 1936, Alfaro was Panamanian envoy extraordinary and minister plenipotentiary to the U.S. In 1946, he was appointed Panama's minister of foreign relations; however, he resigned in 1947 to protest a proposed agreement with the U.S. relating to the Panama Canal.

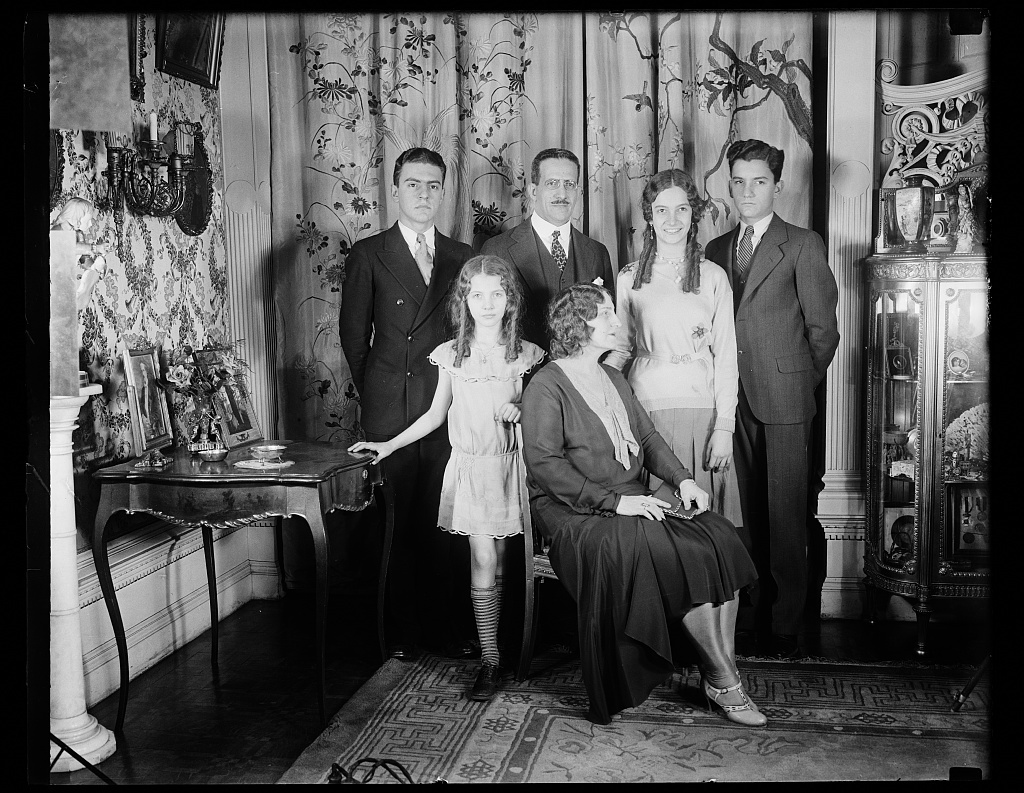
Ricardo J. Alfaro accepts presidency of Panama

He was elected as the first presidential designate by the National Assembly for the term 1928-1930. In 1931, after a revolution in Panama, Alfaro was invited to become his country's president, a position he accepted and held from January 16, 1931 through June 5, 1932. In 1940, he was defeated in the presidential election; however continued to serve his country by helping to draft a new constitution for Panama in 1944.

== Working for the United Nations ==
A significant portion of Alfaro's service to his country related to his work in the United Nations. In 1945, he headed the U.N. Relief and Recovery Administration mission to ten Latin American republics. He was also Panama's delegate to the United Nations Conference on International Organization in San Francisco and chairman of the special committee that drafted the Spanish text of the United Nations Charter of 1945.

In 1949, Alfaro was chairman of the legal committee of the Third session of the United Nations General Assembly that drew up the text of the Convention on Genocide. From 1949 to 1953 served as member of the International Law Commission. In that capacity, he promoted the Declaration on the Rights and Duties of States, and his draft became the basis of the version eventually approved by the commission. On June 3, 1949, he was appointed by that commission as rapporteur on the desirability of establishing a permanent court to try persons guilty of genocide.

== Academic career ==
In addition to his governmental and diplomatic experience, Alfaro's professional acumen derived from a background in law. He was formerly a professor of civil and international law in Panamanian universities. He was also a member of the subcommittee that drafted treaties and arbitrated for the Inter-American Conference on Conciliation and Arbitration held in the U.S. in 1929. From 1959 to 1964, Dr. Alfaro was a judge at the International Court of Justice, serving his last three years as vice-president. In 1964, Dr. Alfaro retired from his official duties.

Alfaro was the author of many articles and books on Panama, and was the recipient of numerous awards and citations for a career dedicated to improving conditions both in his country and globally.

Alfaro died in his eighty-ninth year in Panama City on February 23, 1971. He was survived by his wife, Amelia Lyons de Alfaro; three sons, Victor Ricardo of Washington, Ivan Jose of Lima, Peru, and Rogelio Edwin of Panama City; two daughters, Mrs. Frank H. Weller (née Amelia or Amelita Victoria) of Potomac, Maryland, and Mr. H. Cabell Maddux (née Yolanda Maria) of McLean, Virginia; and many grandchildren and greatgrandchildren, among them the singer Nancy Ames, and attorney and TV personality Elbert Alfaro in Miami Lakes, Florida.

== Alfaro's legal philosophy ==
Throughout his activities as professor of law and member of various judicial bodies, Alfaro promoted the notion of universal criminal jurisdiction and government accountability at all levels. An example to that effect can be seen in that during the deliberations on the law of treaties at the ILC, he opposed the notion that an international agreement reached by exchange of notes did not require ratification by the state legislature of the contracting states.

He held the Nuremberg Principles in high esteem and viewed them as an integral part of the principles of world order and world peace.

Political offices
Preceded by Harmodio Arias	President of Panama; 1931–1932	Succeeded by Harmodio Arias
