= Rodolfo Chiari =

President of Panama (1869–1937)

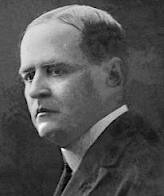

President of Panama
- In office 1 October 1924 – 1 October 1928
- Deputy: Presidential designates Enrique Adolfo Jiménez; Carlos Laureano López; Enrique Linares; Tomás Gabriel Duque; Carlos Laureano López; Enrique Linares
- Preceded by: Belisario Porras
- Succeeded by: Florencio Harmodio Arosemena

Personal details
- Born: Rodolpho Chiari Robles; November 15, 1869 Aguadulce, Panama
- Died: August 16, 1937 (aged 67) Monrovia, California
- Party: National Liberal Party
- Relations: Roberto Francisco Chiari (son)
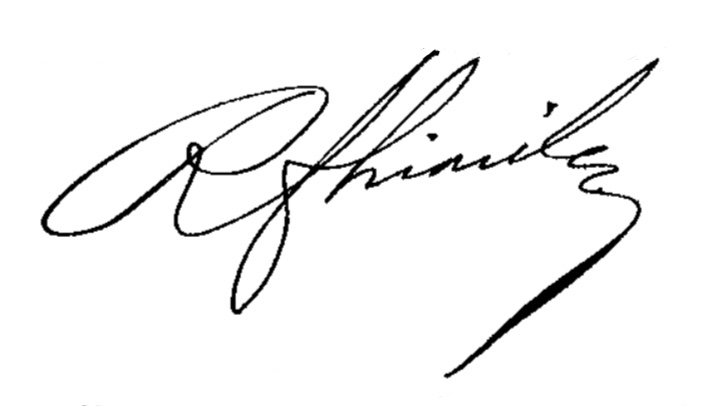
- Signature

Rodolfo Chiari Robles (November 15, 1869 – August 16, 1937) was a Panamanian politician of the National Liberal Party.

Chiari was the general manager of National Bank of Panama from 1909 to 1914. He was elected as the third presidential designate by the National Assembly for the term 1910–1912, and as the first presidential designate for the term 1912–1914, and as the first presidential designate for the term 1922–1924.

Later he was elected as President of Panama from 1 October 1924 to 1 October 1928.

His son, Roberto Francisco Chiari, a Liberal like his father, was President of Panama from 1960 to 1964.

Preceded by Belisario Porras	President of Panama; 1924–1928	Succeeded by Florencio H. Arosemena
