= Belisario Porras =

President of Panama (1856–1942)

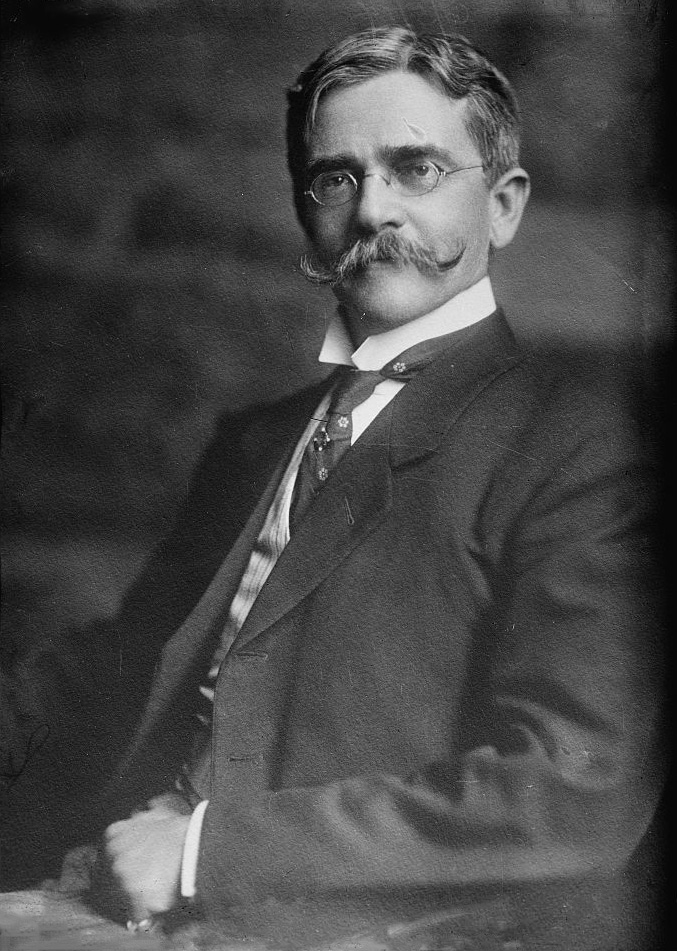

President of Panama
- In office 1 October 1912 – 1 October 1916
- Deputy: Presidential designates Rodolfo Chiari; Ramón Maximiliano Valdés; Aristides Arjona; Ramón Maximiliano Valdés; Manuel Quintero; Ciro Urriola
- Preceded by: Pablo Arosemena
- Succeeded by: Ramón Maximiliano Valdés
- In office 12 October 1918 – 30 January 1920
- Deputy: Presidential designates Pedro Antonio Díaz; Ernesto Lefevre
- Preceded by: Pedro Antonio Díaz
- Succeeded by: Ernesto Lefevre
- In office 1 October 1920 – 1 October 1924
- Deputy: Presidential designates Federico Boyd; Guillermo Andreve; Julio Fábrega; Rodolfo Chiari; Ignacio Quinzada; Nicanor A. De Obarrio
- Preceded by: Ernesto Lefevre
- Succeeded by: Rodolfo Chiari

Personal details
- Born: Belisario Porras Barahona; 28 November 1856 Las Tablas, Republic of New Granada
- Died: 28 August 1942 (aged 85) Panama City, Panama

Belisario Porras Barahona (28 November 1856 – 28 August 1942) was a Panamanian journalist and politician. He served three terms as President of Panama between 1912 and 1924.

Porras was born in Las Tablas, on the thirty-fifth anniversary of Panama's declaration of independence from Spain. Raised by his grandmother, his early education was paid for by his father in Bogotá, the capital of Colombia, which Panama was a province of at the time. He joined his father when he went to secondary school, went on to study law at the National University in 1874, and won a scholarship from the Colombian government to study in Belgium from where he later returned to Panama.

Working as a reporter, he aligned himself with the local Colombian Liberal Party, and was soon the target of persecution by the reigning Conservative government in Bogotá. Exiled to Nicaragua and El Salvador, he took jobs as a professor and a reporter.

As the Thousand Days War began in Colombia, the Liberals in Panama sent for Porras to lead the invasion of the Isthmus in 1900. Working with General Victoriano Lorenzo and others, he began his struggle from Costa Rica in the West. He organized a volunteer army and reached the capital where he was defeated in the Battle of Calidonia Bridge. Porras returned to exile until 1904, after his homeland had acquired its independence.

The Panama Supreme Court revoked Porras' citizenship in 1905. However, the Panama legislature restored his citizenship.

He became a diplomat until becoming president in 1912. The Panama Canal was finished during his first term in office.

He was elected as the first presidential designate by the National Assembly in September 1918. He died in Panama City.

Belisario Porras Barahoma was born to Demetrio Porras Cavero and Juana Gumersinda Barahona. Belisario married twice. First, in 1881 he married Eva Paniza Arosemena and they had 5 children: Belisario Roberto, Demetrio, Camilo, María Teresa, Leticia Antonia. In 1906 he married Alicia Castro and had 4 children: Rodrigo, Hernán, Alicia y Álvaro. He also had children outside of both marriages: Demetrio Augusto, Silvia, Julieta y Emilia.

Political offices
Preceded by Pablo Arosemena	President of Panama; 1912–1916	Succeeded by Ramón Maximiliano Valdés
Preceded by Pedro Antonio Díaz	President of Panama; 1918–1920	Succeeded by Ernesto Lefevre
Preceded by Ernesto Lefevre	President of Panama; 1920–1924	Succeeded by Rodolfo Chiari
