= Harmodio Arias Madrid =

President of Panama in 1931 and from 1932 to 1936

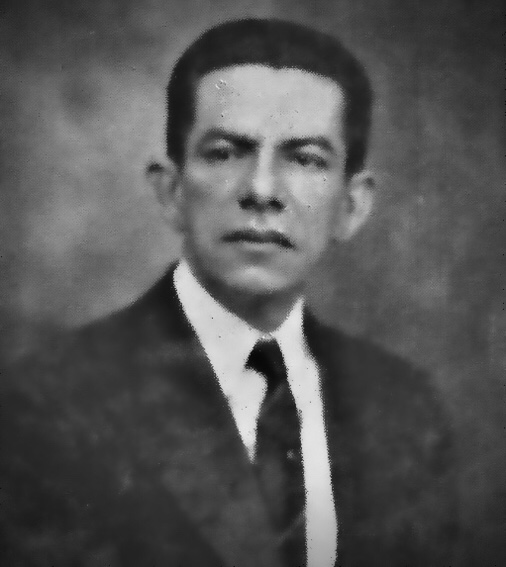

President of Panama
- In office 3 January 1931 – 16 January 1931
- Deputy: Presidential designates Ricardo Alfaro; Carlos Laureano López; Eduardo Chiari
- Preceded by: Florencio Harmodio Arosemena
- Succeeded by: Ricardo Alfaro
- In office 5 June 1932 – 1 October 1936
- Deputy: Presidential designates Domingo Díaz Arosemena; Carlos W. Muller; José de Obaldía Jované; Enrique A. Jiménez; Ricado A. Morales; Miguel Ángel Grimaldo
- Preceded by: Ricardo Alfaro
- Succeeded by: Juan Demóstenes Arosemena

Personal details
- Born: 3 July 1886 Penonomé, Coclé Province, Panama
- Died: 23 December 1962 (aged 76) Panama City, Florida, U.S.

Harmodio Arias Madrid (3 July 1886 – 23 December 1962) was a Panamanian politician. He served as acting President of Panama in January 1931 and again from 5 June 1932 to 1 October 1936, after winning the 1932 presidential election.

== Family ==
His brother Arnulfo Arias was president on three occasions.

Harmodio's son, Roberto was a diplomat and politician who married the English ballerina Margot Fonteyn.

== Presidency ==
Madrid originally assumed the presidency after the 1931 coup d'etat against sitting president Florencio Harmodio Arosemena. However, soon after, he was replaced by Ricardo J. Alfaro. He returned to office after winning the popular vote in the 1932 Panamanian election. He won the election amid increased hostility towards the United States and intense Panamanian nationalism. He pledged during the campaign to enter into a new Panama Canal treaty.

During his presidency, he founded the University of Panamá.

Political offices
| Preceded by Florencio Harmodio Arosemena | President of Panama; 1931 | Succeeded by Ricardo Alfaro |
| Preceded by Ricardo Alfaro | President of Panama; 1932–1936 | Succeeded by Juan Demóstenes Arosemena |
