= Episcopal Conference of Panama =

Assembly of Catholic bishops

The Episcopal Conference of Panama is the union of all the Roman Catholic bishops of Panama, which in turn are the holders of each diocese. The Episcopal Conference of Panama forms a single Ecclesiastical Province, which consists of:

An Archdiocese:

- Roman Catholic Archdiocese of Panama

Five Dioceses:

- Roman Catholic Diocese of Chitre
- Roman Catholic Diocese of Santiago de Veraguas
- Roman Catholic Diocese of David
- Roman Catholic Diocese of Colón-Kuna Yala
- Roman Catholic Diocese of Penonomé

An Apostolic Vicariate:

- Apostolic Vicariate of Darien

A Prelature:

- Roman Catholic Territorial Prelature of Bocas del Toro

== See also ==
- Catholic Church in Panama
