= List of Catholic dioceses in Panama =

The Roman Catholic Church in Panama comprises one ecclesiastical province each headed by an archbishop. The province is in turn subdivided into 5 dioceses, 1 territorial prelature and 1 archdiocese each headed by a bishop or an archbishop.

== List of Dioceses ==
=== Ecclesiastical province of Panamá ===
- Archdiocese of Panamá
  - Diocese of Chitré
  - Diocese of Colón-Kuna Yala
  - Diocese of David
  - Diocese of Penonomé
  - Diocese of Santiago de Veraguas
  - Prelature of Bocas del Toro
