= José Agustín Ganuza García =

Spanish Roman Catholic prelate (1931–2026)

His Excellency José Agustín Ganuza García
- Prelate Emeritus of Bocas del Toro
- Archdiocese: Panamá
- Appointed: 12 March 1970
- Term ended: 1 May 2008
- Predecessor: Martin Legarra Tellechea
- Successor: Anibal Saldaña Santamaría
- Other post: Titular Bishop of Pauzera (1972–1977)

Orders
- Ordination: 27 June 1954
- Consecration: 27 May 1972 by Edoardo Rovida, Marcos G. McGrath and Martin Legarra Tellechea

Personal details
- Born: 28 August 1931 Artajona, Spain
- Died: 20 February 2026 (aged 94)

José Agustín Ganuza García (28 August 1931 – 20 February 2026) was a Spanish Roman Catholic prelate. He was bishop of Territorial Prelature of Bocas del Toro from 1970 to 2008. Ganuza Garcia died on 20 February 2026, at the age of 94.

Catholic Church titles
Preceded by Martin Legarra Tellechea	Prelate of Bocas del Toro; 1970–2008	Succeeded by Anibal Saldaña Santamaría
Preceded by Nicanor Carlos Gavinales Chamorro	Titular Bishop of Pauzera; 1972–1977	Succeeded by Generoso Cambronero Camiña
