= Fernando de Ocampo =

Most Reverend Fernando de Ocampo
- Bishop of Santa Cruz de la Sierra
- Church: Catholic Church
- Diocese: Diocese of Santa Cruz de la Sierra
- In office: 1621–1632
- Predecessor: Antonio Calderón de León
- Successor: Juan de Zapata y Figueroa
- Previous post: Titular Bishop of Usula (1620–1621)

Orders
- Consecration: 1621 by Bartolomé Lobo Guerrero

Personal details
- Died: 1632 Santa Cruz de la Sierra, Bolivia

Fernando de Ocampo, O.F.M. (died 1632) was a Roman Catholic prelate who served as the second Bishop of Santa Cruz de la Sierra (1621–1632) and Titular Bishop of Usula (1620–1621).

== Biography ==
Fernando de Ocampo was ordained a priest in the Order of Friars Minor. On December 14, 1620, he was selected by the King of Spain and confirmed by Pope Paul V as Coadjutor Bishop of Santa Cruz de la Sierra and Titular Bishop of Usula. In 1621, he was consecrated bishop by Bartolomé Lobo Guerrero, Archbishop of Lima and succeeded to the bishopric. He served as Bishop of Santa Cruz de la Sierra until his death in 1632.

While bishop, he was the principal consecrator of Luis Jerónimo Oré, Bishop of Concepción.

== External links and additional sources ==
- Cheney, David M. "Archdiocese of Santa Cruz de la Sierra". Catholic-Hierarchy.org. (for Chronology of Bishops) ^{[self-published]}
- Chow, Gabriel. "Metropolitan Archdiocese of Santa Cruz de la Sierra". GCatholic.org. (for Chronology of Bishops) ^{[self-published]}

Religious titles
Preceded by	Titular Bishop of Usula; 1620–1621	Succeeded by Rodrigo Cruzado Caballero
Preceded by Antonio Calderón de León	Bishop of Santa Cruz de la Sierra; 1621–1632	Succeeded by Juan de Zapata y Figueroa
