= Pedro Duque de Rivera =

Catholic bishop (d. 1954)

Most Reverend Pedro Duque de Rivera
- Bishop of Panamá
- Church: Catholic Church
- Diocese: Diocese of Panamá
- Predecessor: Bartolomé Martinez Menacho y Mesa
- Successor: Antonio Calderón de León

Orders
- Consecration: October 2, 1594 by Nicolás de Ramos y Santos

Personal details
- Died: December 1594 Cartagena

Pedro Duque de Rivera (died December 1594) was a Roman Catholic prelate who was appointed Bishop of Panamá (1594).

== Biography ==
Pedro Duque de Rivera was born in Spain and ordained a priest in the Society of Jesus in Seville. He went to Santo Domingo where he served as dean of the Cathedral of Santa María la Menor. On July 27, 1594, Pope Clement VIII, appointed him Bishop of Panamá. On October 2, 1594, he was consecrated bishop by Nicolás de Ramos y Santos, Archbishop of Santo Domingo. He died in December 1594 in Cartagena.

== External links and additional sources ==
- Cheney, David M. "Archdiocese of Panamá". Catholic-Hierarchy.org. (for Chronology of Bishops) ^{[self-published]}
- Chow, Gabriel. "Metropolitan Archdiocese of Panamá". GCatholic.org. (for Chronology of Bishops) ^{[self-published]}

Religious titles
Preceded by Bartolomé Martinez Menacho y Mesa	Bishop of Panamá; 1594	Succeeded by Antonio Calderón de León
