= Mark McGrath (disambiguation) =

Mark McGrath (born 1986) is an American singer.

Mark McGrath can also refer:

- Marcos G. McGrath (born Mark Gregory McGrath, 1924–2006), Panamanian archbishop
- Mark McGrath (American football) (born 1957), American football player
- Mark McGrath (darts player) (born 1968), English-born New Zealand darts player
