= Territorial Prelature of Bocas del Toro =

Roman Catholic ecclesiastical jurisdiction in Panama

Coordinates: 9.3416°N 82.2409°W

Territorial Prelature of Bocas del Toro Praelatura Territorialis Buccae Taurinae

Location
- Country: Panama
- Ecclesiastical province: Province of Panamá
- Metropolitan: Jose Domingo Ulloa Mendieta, O.S.A.

Statistics
- Area: 16,671 km^{2} (6,437 sq mi)
- Population: Total; Catholics: (as of 2004); 124,000; 62,000 (50%)
- Parishes: 5

Information
- Denomination: Roman Catholic
- Rite: Roman Rite
- Established: 17 October 1962 (63 years ago)
- Cathedral: Cathedral of Our Lady of Carmel

Current leadership
- Pope: Leo XIV
- Prelate: Aníbal Saldaña Santamaría, O.A.R.

Map
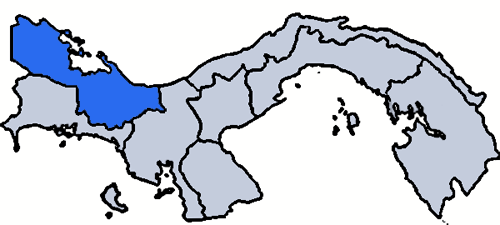

The Roman Catholic Territorial Prelature of Bocas del Toro (Latin: Praelatura Territorialis Buccae Taurinae) is a Latin ecclesiastical circumscription suffragan to the Metropolitan Archdiocese of Panamá.

Its cathedral episcopal see is Catedral Nuestra Señora del Carmen (dedicated to Our Lady of Mount Carmel), in Bocas del Toro, on Isla Colón, in Panama's western, Atlantic Bocas del Toro province.

== History ==
It was established on 17 October 1962 as Territorial Prelature on territory split off from the Roman Catholic Diocese of David.

== Prelate Ordinaries ==
(all Roman Rite, so far members of a Latin congregation)

Bishop-prelates of Bocas del Toro

- Martin Legarra Tellechea, Order of Augustinian Recollects (O.A.R.) (1963.11.06 – 1969.04.03), Titular Bishop of Luperciana (1965.03.18 – 1969.04.03); later Bishop of Santiago de Veraguas (Panama) (1969.04.03 – 1975.02.15)
- José Agustín Ganuza García, O.A.R. (1970.03.12 – 2008.05.01), Titular Bishop of Pauzera (1972.02.04 – 1977.11.18)
- Aníbal Saldaña Santamaría, O.A.R. (2008.05.01 – ...)

== See also ==
- List of Roman Catholic dioceses in Panama
