= Carlos Lewis Tullock =

Panamanian Catholic prelate (1918–2004)

His Excellency, The Most Reverend Carlos Ambrosio Lewis Tullock SVD
- Coadjutor Bishop of David
- Church: Catholic Church
- Diocese: Diocese of David
- Appointed: May 22, 1986
- Term ended: April 18, 1994
- Previous post: Auxiliary Bishop of Panama

Orders
- Ordination: February 24, 1949
- Consecration: October 3, 1965 by Archbishop Tomás Alberto Clavel Méndez Panamá, Bishop Leo Clement Andrew Arkfeld, S.V.D., of Bucellus, Bishop Joseph Bernard Brunini of Axomis

Personal details
- Born: November 2, 1918 La Boca, Panama City, Panama
- Died: November 24, 2009 (aged 91) New Orleans, Louisiana
- Buried: Bay St. Louis, Mississippi
- Education: St. Augustine Seminary (Bay St. Louis)

Carlos Ambrosio Lewis Tullock, SVD (November 2, 1918 – November 29, 2004) was an Afro-Panamanian Catholic prelate who served as Coadjutor Bishop of David from 1986 to 1994. He was previously an Auxiliary Bishop of Panamá. He was a member of the Society of the Divine Word.

== Biography ==
Carlos Ambrosio Lewis Tullock was born in La Boca in Panama City, Panama, and later joined the Society of the Divine Word. He was educated at St. Augustine Seminary in Bay St. Louis, Mississippi, and was ordained to the priesthood on February 24, 1949.

Pope Paul VI appointed him an Auxiliary Bishop of Panama and Titular Bishop of Nova Petra on June 22, 1965. The Archbishop of Panama, Tomás Alberto Clavel Méndez, consecrated him on October 3 of the same year; co-consecrators were Leo Arkfeld, SVD, Vicar Apostolic of Diocese of Wewak, and Joseph Bernard Brunini, Auxiliary Bishop of Jackson.

During the Second Vatican Council, Tullock took part as council father in the fourth session. The pope appointed him Coadjutor Bishop of David on May 22, 1986. On April 18, 1994, Pope John Paul II accepted his retirement due to age.

Tullock died in New Orleans on November 29, 2004. He is buried at the cemetery of St. Augustine Seminary, his alma mater in Mississippi.
