= Alonso de Briceño =

Spanish Roman Catholic prelate

Most Reverend Alonso de Briceño
- Bishop of Caracas (Santiago de Venezuela)
- Church: Catholic Church
- Archdiocese: Diocese of Caracas (Santiago de Venezuela)
- In office: 1653–1668
- Predecessor: Mauro Diego de Tovar y Valle Maldonado
- Successor: Antonio González de Acuña
- Previous post: Bishop of Nicaragua (1644–1653)

Orders
- Consecration: 12 November 1645 by Hernando de Ramírez y Sánchez

Personal details
- Born: 1587 Santiago, Chile
- Died: 16 November 1668 (aged 80–81) Trujillo, Peru

Alonso Juan de Arévalo Briceño y Arias de Córdoba, O.F.M. or Alonso de Brizeño (1587 – 16 November 1668) was a Roman Catholic prelate who served as Bishop of Caracas (Santiago de Venezuela) (1653–1668) and Bishop of Nicaragua (1644–1653). He was a Scotist philosopher.

== Biography ==
Alonso Juan de Arévalo Briceño y Arias de Córdoba was born in Santiago (now Chile) in 1587, the son of Captain Alonso de Arévalo Briceño y Mansilla, born in Guadalajara, and Jerónima Arias de la Peña y Córdoba, a Creole from Santiago. When he was five years old, the family moved to Lima. After completing his studies, he entered the Order of Friars Minor in Lima on January 30, 1605. He was professed the following year. He was ordained a priest and served as Guardian of the Convent of San Francisco in Lima. He was also named provincial visitor and later presided over the Chapter of the Franciscan province of Peru. Briceño wrote a number of manuscripts on the work of Duns Scotus.

In 1637 Briceño traveled to Madrid as procurator for the canonization of Francis Solanus. He continued on to Rome, where he was the representative of Peru in the General Chapter of 1639. Briceño remained three years in Rome, where he became a consultant to the Holy Office.

Upon the recommendation of King Philip IV, Pope Urban VIII chose him as Bishop of Nicaragua and Costa Rica on 28 July 1644. On 12 November 1645, he was consecrated bishop in Panama by Hernando de Ramírez y Sánchez, Bishop of Panamá; and installed in December 1645.

On 18 August 1653, Pope Julius III appointed Briceño Bishop of Caracas, Santiago de Venezuela. After some delay he arrived in Maracaibo on December 27, 1660, and at Trujillo on June 14, 1661. When he arrived, he brought among his belongings a library of more than 1,000 large books, classified among the best that existed in the colonial period. For almost eight years, he managed the diocese from there, having no particular wish to travel to Caracas. As bishop, he was the principal consecrator of Payo Afán Enríquez de Ribera Manrique de Lara, Bishop of Santiago de Guatemala (1658) and Bernardo de Izaguirre de los Reyes, Bishop of Panamá (1659).

He died at Trujillo on 16 November 1668. The assets that he left after his death gave rise to numerous lawsuits for several years, between the Ecclesiastical Council, the Franciscan order and the relatives of the deceased.

== External links and additional sources ==
- Cheney, David M. "Diocese of León en Nicaragua". Catholic-Hierarchy.org. (for Chronology of Bishops) ^{[self-published]}
- Chow, Gabriel. "Diocese of León (Nicaragua)". GCatholic.org. (for Chronology of Bishops) ^{[self-published]}
- Cheney, David M. "Archdiocese of Caracas, Santiago de Venezuela". Catholic-Hierarchy.org. (for Chronology of Bishops) ^{[self-published]}

Catholic Church titles
Preceded by Miguel de Poblete Casasola	Bishop of Nicaragua; 1644–1653	Succeeded by Tomás Manso
Preceded by Mauro Diego de Tovar y Valle Maldonado	Bishop of Caracas (Santiago de Venezuela); 1653–1668	Succeeded by Antonio González de Acuña
