= Pablo Varela Server =

Spanish Roman Catholic prelate (1942–2024)

- Auxiliary Bishop Emertus of Panamá
- Appointed: 26 February 2004
- Term ended: 26 April 2019
- Other post: Titular Bishop of Macomades Rusticiana (2004–2024)

Orders
- Ordination: 28 June 1970 by Charles-Marie Himmer
- Consecration: 17 April 2004 by José Dimas Cedeño Delgado

Personal details
- Born: 2 July 1942 Dénia, Spain
- Died: 6 January 2024 (aged 81) Panama City, Panama
- Education: Université catholique de Louvain; University of Havana; University of Valencia; Pontifical Gregorian University
- Motto: Amen
- Coat of arms

Styles of Pablo Varela Server
- Reference style: His Excellency; The Most Reverend
- Spoken style: Your Excellency
- Religious style: Bishop

Pablo Varela Server (2 July 1942 – 6 January 2024) was a Spanish prelate of the Catholic Church. He served as auxiliary bishop of Panamá from 2004 to 2019. He was also the titular bishop of Macomades Rusticiana until his death.

== Biography ==
Varela was ordained a priest on 28 June 1970. In 1972, he went to Panama and became a lecturer at the seminary in the capital city. In 1998, he became the rector of this university, and shortly afterwards he took up the same office at the Universidad Católica Santa María La Antigua.

On 26 February 2004, Varela was appointed by Pope John Paul II as auxiliary bishop of Panama, with the titular see of Macomades Rusticiana. On 17 April 2004, he was consecrated a bishop by Archbishop José Dimas Cedeño Delgado. He resigned from his post as auxiliary bishop of Panama in 2019, which was accepted by Pope Francis on 26 April.

Varela died in Panama City on 6 January 2024, at the age of 81.

Catholic Church titles
Preceded by —	Auxiliary Bishop of Panamá; 2004–2019	Succeeded by —
Preceded by Edward Braxton	Titular Bishop of Macomades Rusticiana; 2004–2024	Succeeded by Vacant
