= Alfonso López =

Alfonso López may refer to:

- Alfonso López III (born 1982), Mexican-American super middleweight boxer
- Alfonso López de Avila (died 1591), Spanish-born Roman Catholic prelate in the Americas
- Alfonso López Caballero (born 1944), Colombian ambassador to London, from 2002
- Alfonso López-Chau (born 1950), Peruvian academic and politician
- Alfonso López Michelsen (1913–2007), president of Colombia, 1974–1978
- Alfonso López (Panamanian boxer), Panamanian boxer
- Alfonso López Pumarejo (1886–1959), president of Colombia, 1934–1938 and 1942–1945
- Alfonso López Trujillo (1935–2008), Colombian cardinal bishop, president of the Pontifical Council for the Family
- Alfonso H. Lopez (born 1970), politician from the U.S. state of Virginia
- Alfonso D. Lopez, Jr., party to United States v. Lopez, a case heard by the Supreme Court of the United States

== See also ==
- Alfonso López Pumarejo Airport, main airport in the city of Valledupar, Colombia
- Alfonso López Pumarejo Stadium, a soccer stadium in University City of Bogotá
- Estadio Alfonso López, a multi-use stadium in Bucaramanga, Colombia
