= Jesús Héctor Gallego Herrera =

Colombian Roman Catholic priest (died 1971)

Héctor Gallego
- Born: Jesús Héctor Gallego Herrera; 7 January 1938; Salgar, Antioquia, Colombia
- Disappeared: 9 June 1971 (aged 33); Santa Fe, Veraguas, Panama
- Occupation: Roman Catholic priest
- Known for: Forced disappearance

Jesús Héctor Gallego Herrera (7 January 1938 – c. 9 June 1971) was a Colombian Roman Catholic priest who was kidnapped and killed in Panama in 1971, during the military rule of Omar Torrijos.

== Life ==
Gallego was born in Salgar, Antioquia, Colombia. After studies at the archdiocesan major seminary in Medellín from 1963 to 1965, he served at the diocese of Jericó before moving to Panama in 1967. Gallego served at the diocese of Santiago de Veraguas, and was ordained a priest by Marcos G. McGrath on 16 July 1967. In August 1967 he moved to the diocese of Santa Fe, Veraguas.

In Santa Fe Gallego worked on social projects, and organized the poor peasants of the district into cooperatives. This angered both the landowners of the area and officials of the ruling National Guard, who accused him of being a communist. Gallego disappeared from Santa Fe on 9 June 1971.

== Investigation and convictions ==
The initial investigation into Gallego's disappearance was marked by irregularities, and the case was shelved in 1973. After the end of military rule in Panama, the case was reopened in 1990.

In October–November 1993, four former National Guard soldiers were tried for the abduction and murder of Gallego: Óscar Agrazal, Eugenio Nelson Magallón, Nivaldo Madriñán, and Melbourne Walker. With the exception of Agrazal, who was acquitted, the soldiers were convicted on 20 November 1993, and each given a 15-year prison sentence. Madriñán would serve two thirds of his sentence, while Walker was granted house arrest. Magallón was convicted in absentia, as he had been a fugitive since the 1989 US invasion of Panama; more than 30 years after his conviction, he was arrested in May 2025. The trial led to a national debate in Panama over the reputation of Torrijos, who was popularly seen by some as a benevolent dictator.

In December 2000, human remains believed to be Gallego's were discovered at the Los Pumas barracks, a former military base in Tocumen. President Mireya Moscoso appointed a Truth Commission to investigate the site and those at other bases. In 2002, the commission concluded that Gallego had been forcibly disappeared, but that the remains found at the Los Pumas barracks were not his.

== Bibliography ==
- Harding, Robert C. (2006). The History of Panama. Greenwood Press. ISBN 031333322X.
