= Martín de Béjar =

Roman Catholic bishop

Most Reverend Martín de Béjar
- Bishop of Panamá
- Church: Catholic Church
- Diocese: Diocese of Panamá
- In office: 1527–1530
- Predecessor: Vicente de Peraza
- Successor: Vicente de Valverde

Personal details
- Died: 1530

Martín de Béjar (died 1530) was a Roman Catholic prelate who served as the third Bishop of Panamá (1527–1530).

== Biography ==
A native of Seville, Martín de Béjar was ordained a priest in the Order of Friars Minor. In 1527, Pope Clement VII appointed him as the third Bishop of Panamá. While bishop, the seat of the diocese was transferred to Panama City on the Pacific coast. He served as Bishop until his death in 1530.

== See also ==
- Catholic Church in Panama

== External links and additional sources ==
- Cheney, David M. "Archdiocese of Panamá". Catholic-Hierarchy.org. (for Chronology of Bishops) ^{[self-published]}
- Chow, Gabriel. "Metropolitan Archdiocese of Panamá". GCatholic.org. (for Chronology of Bishops) ^{[self-published]}

Religious titles
| Preceded by Vicente de Peraza | Bishop of Panamá; 1527–1530 | Succeeded by Vicente de Valverde |
