= Antonio Calderón de León =

Roman Catholic bishop

Most Reverend Antonio Calderón de León
- Bishop of Santa Cruz de la Sierra
- Church: Catholic Church
- Diocese: Diocese of Santa Cruz de la Sierra
- In office: 1605–1621
- Predecessor: None
- Successor: Fernando de Ocampo
- Previous posts: Bishop of Panamá (1598–1605); Bishop of Puerto Rico (1593–1598)

Orders
- Consecration: December 1597 by Domingo de Ulloa

Personal details
- Born: 1540 Baeza, Spain
- Died: 1621 (age 81)

Antonio Calderón de León (1540–1621) was a Roman Catholic prelate who served as the first Bishop of Santa Cruz de la Sierra (1605–1621), Bishop of Panamá (1598–1605), and Bishop of Puerto Rico (1593–1598).

== Biography ==
Antonio Calderón de León was born in Baeza, Spain. On October 29, 1593, Pope Clement VIII, appointed him Bishop of Puerto Rico. In December 1597, he was consecrated bishop by Domingo de Ulloa, Bishop of Popayán. On May 23, 1598, Pope Clement VIII, appointed him Bishop of Panamá. On July 4, 1605, Pope Paul V, appointed him the first Bishop of Santa Cruz de la Sierra where he served until his death in 1621.

== External links and additional sources ==
- Cheney, David M. "Archdiocese of San Juan de Puerto Rico". Catholic-Hierarchy.org. (for Chronology of Bishops) ^{[self-published]}
- Chow, Gabriel. "Metropolitan Archdiocese of San Juan de Puerto Rico". GCatholic.org. (for Chronology of Bishops) ^{[self-published]}
- Cheney, David M. "Archdiocese of Panamá". Catholic-Hierarchy.org. (for Chronology of Bishops) ^{[self-published]}
- Chow, Gabriel. "Metropolitan Archdiocese of Panamá". GCatholic.org. (for Chronology of Bishops) ^{[self-published]}
- Cheney, David M. "Archdiocese of Santa Cruz de la Sierra". Catholic-Hierarchy.org. (for Chronology of Bishops) ^{[self-published]}
- Chow, Gabriel. "Metropolitan Archdiocese of Santa Cruz de la Sierra". GCatholic.org. (for Chronology of Bishops) ^{[self-published]}

Religious titles
Preceded by Nicolás de Ramos y Santos	Bishop of Puerto Rico; 1593–1598	Succeeded by Martín Vasquez de Arce
Preceded by Pedro Duque de Rivera	Bishop of Panamá; 1598–1605	Succeeded by Agustín de Carvajal
Preceded by None	Bishop of Santa Cruz de la Sierra; 1605–1621	Succeeded by Fernando de Ocampo
