= Juan de Vaca =

Bishop of Panamá (1561–1565)

Most Reverend Juan de Vaca
- Bishop of Panamá
- Church: Catholic Church
- Diocese: Diocese of Panamá
- In office: 1561–1565
- Predecessor: Pablo de Torres
- Successor: Francisco de Abrego

Orders
- Consecration: February 8, 1562

Personal details
- Born: Valladolid, Spain
- Died: 1565

Juan de Vaca (also Juan de Baca) (died 1565) was a Roman Catholic prelate who served as Bishop of Panamá (1561–1565).

== Biography ==
Juan de Vaca was born in Valladolid, Spain and ordained a priest in the Order of Saint Benedict. On January 27, 1561, Pope Pius IV, appointed him Bishop of Panamá and he was consecrated bishop on February 8, 1562. He served as Bishop of Panamá during the governorship of Luis de Guzman and successfully organized a counter-revolt against Rodrigo Méndez who seized the city during the governor's absence. He was also credited by the townsfolk with miraculously halting an expansive fire in 1563 by leading a procession with the Blessed Sacrament directly to the heart of the fire which was then shortly thereafter extinguished. He served as Bishop of Panamá until his death in 1565. He was the co-consecrator of Francisco del Toral, Bishop of Yucatán.

== External links and additional sources ==
- Cheney, David M. "Archdiocese of Panamá". Catholic-Hierarchy.org. (for Chronology of Bishops) ^{[self-published]}
- Chow, Gabriel. "Metropolitan Archdiocese of Panamá". GCatholic.org. (for Chronology of Bishops) ^{[self-published]}

Catholic Church titles
Preceded by Pablo de Torres	Bishop of Panamá; 1561–1565	Succeeded by Francisco de Abrego
