= Juan Méndez de Villafranca =

Most Reverend Juan Méndez de Villafranca
- Bishop of Santa Marta
- Church: Catholic Church
- Diocese: Diocese of Santa Marta
- In office: 1577
- Predecessor: Juan de los Barrios
- Successor: Sebastián Ocando

Personal details
- Born: Villafranca de los Barros, Spain
- Died: Dec 1577

Juan Méndez de Villafranca, O.P. (died 1577) was a Roman Catholic prelate who served as Bishop of Santa Marta (1577).

== Biography ==
Juan Méndez de Villafranca was born in Villafranca de los Barros, Spain and ordained a priest in the Order of Preachers. On 14 Apr 1577, he was appointed during the papacy of Pope Gregory XIII as Bishop of Santa Marta. He served as Bishop of Santa Marta until his death in Dec 1577.

== External links and additional sources ==
- Cheney, David M. "Diocese of Santa Marta". Catholic-Hierarchy.org. (for Chronology of Bishops) ^{[self-published]}
- Chow, Gabriel. "Metropolitan Diocese of Santa Marta (Colombia)". GCatholic.org. (for Chronology of Bishops) ^{[self-published]}

Catholic Church titles
Preceded by Juan de los Barrios	Bishop of Santa Marta; 1577	Succeeded by Sebastián Ocando
