= Juan de Quevedo =

Spanish Franciscan priest

Most Reverend Juan de Quevedo
- Bishop of Santa María de La Antigua del Darién
- Church: Catholic Church
- Diocese: Diocese of Santa María de La Antigua del Darién
- Predecessor: None
- Successor: Vicente de Peraza

Orders
- Consecration: January 29, 1514 by Diego de Deza

Personal details
- Born: 1450 Bejoris, Spain
- Died: December 24, 1519 (age 69) Barcelona

Juan de Quevedo (es:Vejorís, c. 1450 – December 24, 1519) was a Spanish Franciscan priest and the first Bishop of Santa María de La Antigua del Darién in Panama (1513–1519).

== Biography ==
Juan de Quevedo was born in Vejorís, Cantabria, Spain and ordained a priest in the Order of Friars Minor. On September 9, 1513 - at the request of King Ferdinand, husband of Queen Isabella - Pope Leo X appointed him Bishop of Santa María de La Antigua del Darién On January 29, 1514, he was consecrated by bishop by Diego de Deza, Archbishop of Seville.

He left for the Indies in 1514 along with Hernando de Luque on a fleet commanded by Pedro Arias Dávila. Conflict between Quevedo and Arias Dávila soon ensued as Quevedo strongly protested against the cruel acts committed by the governor and his officers, not only against the Indians, but also against rivals, such as the beheading of Vasco Nuñez de Balboa, the discoverer of the Pacific Ocean. Counter charges were brought against Quevedo with Bartolomé de Las Casas accusing him of having violated a trust, accumulated wealth, and neglected the Indians, but the veracity of Las Casas' accusations has not been established. Quevedo returned to Spain in (1518) and presented two memorials to King Charles. One was against Arias Dávila, and the other advocated restricting the powers of all governors in the New World for the better protection of the natives. When these documents were shown to Las Casas, in spite of differences between the two, he offered to countersign them. Bishop Quevedo soon fell sick and died at Barcelona.

In spite of Quevedo's record as a champion of the rights of Native Americans, his views were still coloured by his time and his missionary fervour. He regarded all the aborigines of America to be a race of men whom it would be impossible to instruct or improve unless they were collected in villages or missions and kept under continual supervision.

== External links and additional sources ==
- Cheney, David M. "Archdiocese of Panamá". Catholic-Hierarchy.org. (for Chronology of Bishops) ^{[self-published]}
- Chow, Gabriel. "Metropolitan Archdiocese of Panamá". GCatholic.org. (for Chronology of Bishops) ^{[self-published]}

Religious titles
Preceded by None	Bishop of Santa María de La Antigua del Darién; 1513–1519	Succeeded by Vicente de Peraza
