= Uriah Adolphus Ashley Maclean =

Panamanian Roman Catholic bishop (1944–2020)

- Titular Bishop of Agbia
- Church: Catholic Church
- In office: 25 June 2015 – 25 November 2020
- Predecessor: Pedro Cunha Cruz
- Other post: Auxiliary Bishop of Panamá (2015-2019)

Orders
- Ordination: 15 August 1979
- Consecration: 6 January 1994 by Pope John Paul II

Personal details
- Born: 1 February 1944 Almirante, Bocas del Toro Province, Panama
- Died: 25 November 2020 (aged 76) Panama City, Panama

Uriah Adolphus Ashley Maclean (1 February 1944 – 25 November 2020) was a Panamanian Roman Catholic bishop.

Maclean was born in Panama and was ordained to the priesthood in 1979. He served as bishop of the Roman Catholic Diocese of Penonomé, Panama, from 1993 to 2015. He then served as titular bishop of Agbia and auxiliary bishop of the Roman Catholic Archdiocese of Panama, Panama, from 2015 to 2019.
