= Apostolic Vicariate of Darién =

Roman Catholic ecclesiastical jurisdiction in Panama

Vicariate Apostolic of Darién Vicariatus Apostolicus Darienensis

Location
- Country: Panama
- Ecclesiastical province: Province of Panamá
- Metropolitan: Jose Domingo Ulloa Mendieta, O.S.A.

Statistics
- Area: 16,671 km^{2} (6,437 sq mi)
- Population: Total; Catholics: (as of 2010); 55,900; 44,700 (80%)
- Parishes: 9

Information
- Denomination: Roman Catholic
- Rite: Roman Rite
- Established: 29 November 1925 (99 years ago)
- Cathedral: Cathedral of Our Lady of Guadalupe

Current leadership
- Pope: Francis
- Apostolic Vicar: Pedro Joaquin Hernández Cantarero, C.M.F.

Map
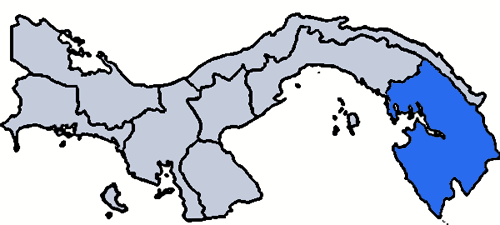

The Roman Catholic Vicariate Apostolic of Darién (Latin: Vicariatus Apostolicus Darienensis) was erected on 29 November 1925.

== Ordinaries ==
- Juan José Maíztegui y Besoitaiturria, C.M.F. (1926 - 1932)
- José María Preciado y Nieva, C.M.F. (1934 - 1955)
- Jesús Serrano Pastor, C.M.F. (1956 - 1981)
- Carlos María Ariz Bolea, C.M.F. (1981 - 1988)
- Rómulo Emiliani Sánchez, C.M.F. (1988 - 2002)
- Pedro Joaquin Hernández Cantarero, C.M.F. (2005 - )

== Territorial losses ==
Year	Along with	To form
1988		Diocese of Colón

== External links and references ==
- "Vicariate Apostolic of Darién". Catholic-Hierarchy. Archived from the original on 5 February 2007.
