= Bartolomé Martinez Menacho y Mesa =

Spanish Roman Catholic prelate

Most Reverend Bartolomé Martinez Menacho y Mesa
- Archbishop of Santafé en Nueva Granada
- Church: Catholic Church
- Diocese: Archdiocese of Santafé en Nueva Granada
- In office: 1593–1604
- Predecessor: Alfonso López de Avila
- Successor: Bartolomé Lobo Guerrero
- Previous post: Bishop of Panamá (1587–1593)

Orders
- Consecration: September 4, 1588 by Turibius of Mogrovejo

Personal details
- Born: 1517 Torre de Miguel Sesmero, Spain
- Died: February 16, 1604 (age 87) Cartagena

Bartolomé Martinez Menacho y Mesa (Mechado) (1517 – February 16, 1604) was a Roman Catholic prelate who served as Archbishop of Santafé en Nueva Granada (1593–1604) and Bishop of Panamá (1587–1593).

== Biography ==
Bartolomé Martinez Menacho y Mesa was born in Torre de Miguel Sesmero, Spain and ordained a priest in the Order of Preachers. He went to Peru where he served as archdeacon of the Cathedral of Lima. On April 27, 1587, Pope Sixtus V, appointed him Bishop of Panamá. On September 4, 1588, he was consecrated bishop by Turibius of Mogrovejo, Archbishop of Lima with Antonio Avendaño y Paz, Bishop of Concepción assisting. His term in Panama was marked by good relations with the government authorities with little meddling in church affairs; he also defended the Black population and prevented their harsh punishment after a rebellion. On April 30, 1593, Pope Clement VIII, appointed him the Archbishop of Santafé en Nueva Granada where he served until his death on February 16, 1604 in Cartagena.

== External links and additional sources ==
- Cheney, David M. "Archdiocese of Panamá". Catholic-Hierarchy.org. (for Chronology of Bishops) ^{[self-published]}
- Chow, Gabriel. "Metropolitan Archdiocese of Panamá". GCatholic.org. (for Chronology of Bishops) ^{[self-published]}
- Cheney, David M. "Archdiocese of Bogotá". Catholic-Hierarchy.org. (for Chronology of Bishops) ^{[self-published]}
- Chow, Gabriel. "Metropolitan Archdiocese of Bogotá (Colombia)". GCatholic.org. (for Chronology of Bishops) ^{[self-published]}

Religious titles
Preceded by Bartolomé de Ledesma	Bishop of Panamá; 1587–1593	Succeeded by Pedro Duque de Rivera
Preceded by Alfonso López de Avila	Archdiocese of Santafé en Nueva Granada; 1593–1604	Succeeded by Bartolomé Lobo Guerrero
