= Diego de Salamanca =

Puerto Rican bishop

Most Reverend Diego de Salamanca
- Bishop of Puerto Rico
- Church: Catholic Church
- Diocese: Diocese of Puerto Rico
- Predecessor: Manuel de Mercado Aldrete
- Successor: Nicolás de Ramos y Santos

Personal details
- Born: 1519 Burgos
- Died: 1588 (age 69)

Fr. Diego de Salamanca Polanco. O.S.A. (1519–1588) was the first Augustinian who was a Roman Catholic bishop in Puerto Rico.

He was Spanish, born in Burgos, Spain in 1519. His parents were Francisco de Salamanca Polanco and Leonor Orense. In 1541, he came with the Augustinians and made his profession. In 1547, he went to Mexico as a missionary and remained there until 1562, when he returned to Spain.

As prior of the convent San Felipe Real Madrid, he was presented by the king of Spain to the bishopric of Puerto Rico on March 28, 1576. He came to the island on August 17, 1577 and two others accompanied him, Fr. Juan de Parras and Fr. Francisco Figueroa. The latter appointed him bishop and vicar.

Fr. Diego made pastoral visits throughout the island and undertook the task of reform as laid down by the Council of Trent. It began with the introduction of the new Tridentine liturgy, adopted the new ritual and new prayer books. He continued with the factory's Cathedral, was devoted to religious instruction and correction of customs. The annexes of Cumana and Margarita Island were visited by his provisor, Fr. Francisco Figueroa. Then in 1579, he personally visited the annexes. The situation around the bishopric was very precarious. The people were living very poorly, The diocese had very few priests and religious to meet the spiritual needs of parishioners.

There are real problems with officials, who accused him of being a smuggler, taking advantage of his position as bishop. Additional health problems and other personnel asked the king to permit him to travel to Rome and expose it to the pope. He was awarded in 1586 and returned to Spain. Once there, he renounced the bishopric on April 4, 1587; it was accepted in 1588. He retired to his former convent of Burgos, where he spent the last years of his life.

While bishop, he was the principal consecrator of Pedro González Acevedo, Bishop of Orense.

== External links and additional sources ==
- Cheney, David M. "Archdiocese of San Juan de Puerto Rico". Catholic-Hierarchy.org. (for Chronology of Bishops) ^{[self-published]}
- Chow, Gabriel. "Metropolitan Archdiocese of San Juan de Puerto Rico". GCatholic.org. (for Chronology of Bishops) ^{[self-published]}

Religious titles
Preceded by Manuel de Mercado Aldrete	Bishop of Puerto Rico; 1576–1587	Succeeded by Nicolás de Ramos y Santos
