= Francisco de la Cámara y Raya =

Most Reverend Francisco de la Cámara y Raya
- Bishop of Panamá
- Church: Catholic Church
- Diocese: Diocese of Panamá
- In office: 1612–1624
- Predecessor: Agustín de Carvajal
- Successor: Cristóbal Martínez de Salas

Orders
- Consecration: 1614 by Juan Bartolomé de Bohorquez e Hinojosa

Personal details
- Born: Granada, Spain
- Died: August 18, 1624 Panama City

Francisco de la Cámara y Raya (died 18 August 1624) was a Roman Catholic prelate who served as Bishop of Panamá (1612–1624).

== Biography ==
Francisco de la Cámara y Raya was born in Granada, Spain and ordained a priest in the Order of Preachers. On November 27, 1612, Pope Paul V, appointed him Bishop of Panamá. In 1614, he was consecrated bishop by Juan Bartolomé de Bohorquez e Hinojosa, Bishop of Coro. He served as Bishop of Panamá until his death on August 18, 1624.

== External links and additional sources ==
- Cheney, David M. "Archdiocese of Panamá". Catholic-Hierarchy.org. (for Chronology of Bishops) ^{[self-published]}
- Chow, Gabriel. "Metropolitan Archdiocese of Panamá". GCatholic.org. (for Chronology of Bishops) ^{[self-published]}

Catholic Church titles
| Preceded by Agustín de Carvajal | Bishop of Panamá; 1612–1624 | Succeeded by Cristóbal Martínez de Salas |
