= Tomás de Berlanga =

Fourth Bishop of Panamá (1487–1551)

Most Reverend Tomás de Berlanga
- Bishop of Panama
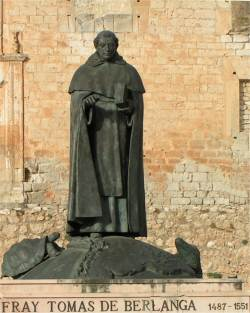
- Statue of Fray Tomás in Berlanga de Duero
- Church: Catholic Church
- Diocese: Diocese of Panama
- Predecessor: Vicente de Valverde
- Successor: Pablo de Torres

Orders
- Consecration: 1534 by Francisco Mendoza de Bobadilla

Personal details
- Born: 1487 Berlanga de Duero, Spain
- Died: 8 August 1551 (age 64) Berlanga de Duero, Spain

Fray Tomás de Berlanga, O.P., (1487 – 8 August 1551) was the fourth Bishop of Panamá.

== Biography ==
Tomás de Berlanga was born in Berlanga de Duero in Soria, Spain. On February 11, 1534, Pope Clement VII appointed him Bishop of Panama. On May 17, 1534, he was consecrated bishop by Francisco Mendoza de Bobadilla, Bishop of Coria. Francisco Mendoza, Bishop of Palencia, was co-consecrator, with Father Francisco de Navarra y Hualde assisting.

In 1535, he sailed to Peru to settle a dispute between Francisco Pizarro and Diego de Almagro over division of territory after the conquest of the Inca Empire. His ship stalled when the winds died and strong currents carried him out to the Galápagos Islands which he thus discovered on March 10, 1535. He sent an account of the adventure and discovery to Charles V, Holy Roman Emperor and King of Spain. Berlanga resigned his see in 1537.

When Tomás de Berlanga returned to the Berlanga de Duero from America, he brought with him a cayman from the Chagres River in Panama. This cayman measured 3 meters. It is currently on display in the Colegiata de Nuestra Señora del Mercado in Berlanga de Duero.

== External links and additional sources ==
- Cheney, David M. "Archdiocese of Panamá". Catholic-Hierarchy.org. (for Chronology of Bishops) ^{[self-published]}
- Chow, Gabriel. "Metropolitan Archdiocese of Panamá". GCatholic.org. (for Chronology of Bishops) ^{[self-published]}
- Varon Gabai, Rafael (1997). Francisco Pizarro and His Brothers. University of Oklahoma Press. pp. 54–61. ISBN 080612833X.

Catholic Church titles
Preceded by Vicente de Valverde	Bishop of Panamá; 1534–1537	Succeeded by Pablo de Torres
