= Manuel de Mercado Aldrete =

Spanish Roman Catholic prelate

Most Reverend Manuel de Mercado Aldrete
- Bishop of Panamá
- Church: Catholic Church
- Diocese: Diocese of Panamá
- In office: 1576–1580
- Predecessor: Francisco de Abrego
- Successor: Bartolomé de Ledesma
- Previous post: Bishop of Puerto Rico (1570–1576)

Orders
- Consecration: 1571 by Cristóbal Rojas Sandoval

Personal details
- Born: Spain
- Died: 4 April 1580

Manuel de Mercado Aldrete, O.S.H. (died 4 April 1580) was a Roman Catholic prelate who served as Bishop of Panamá (1576–1580) and Bishop of Puerto Rico (1570–1576).

== Biography ==
Manuel de Mercado Aldrete was born in Spain and ordained a priest in the Order of Saint Jerome. On February September 4, 1570, Pope Pius V, appointed him Bishop of Puerto Rico. In 1571, he was consecrated bishop by Cristóbal Rojas Sandoval, Archbishop of Seville. On March 28, 1576, Pope Gregory XIII, appointed him Bishop of Panamá. He served as Bishop of Panamá until his death on 4 April 1580.

== External links and additional sources ==
- Cheney, David M. "Archdiocese of San Juan de Puerto Rico". Catholic-Hierarchy.org. (for Chronology of Bishops) ^{[self-published]}
- Chow, Gabriel. "Metropolitan Archdiocese of San Juan de Puerto Rico". GCatholic.org. (for Chronology of Bishops) ^{[self-published]}
- Cheney, David M. "Archdiocese of Panamá". Catholic-Hierarchy.org. (for Chronology of Bishops) ^{[self-published]}
- Chow, Gabriel. "Metropolitan Archdiocese of Panamá". GCatholic.org. (for Chronology of Bishops) ^{[self-published]}

Catholic Church titles
Preceded by Francisco Andrés de Carvajal	Bishop of Puerto Rico; 1570–1576	Succeeded by Diego de Salamanca
Preceded by Francisco de Abrego	Bishop of Panamá; 1576–1580	Succeeded by Bartolomé de Ledesma
