= Luis Zapata de Cárdenas =

Archbishop of Santafé

Most Reverend Luis Zapata de Cárdenas
- Archbishop of Santafé
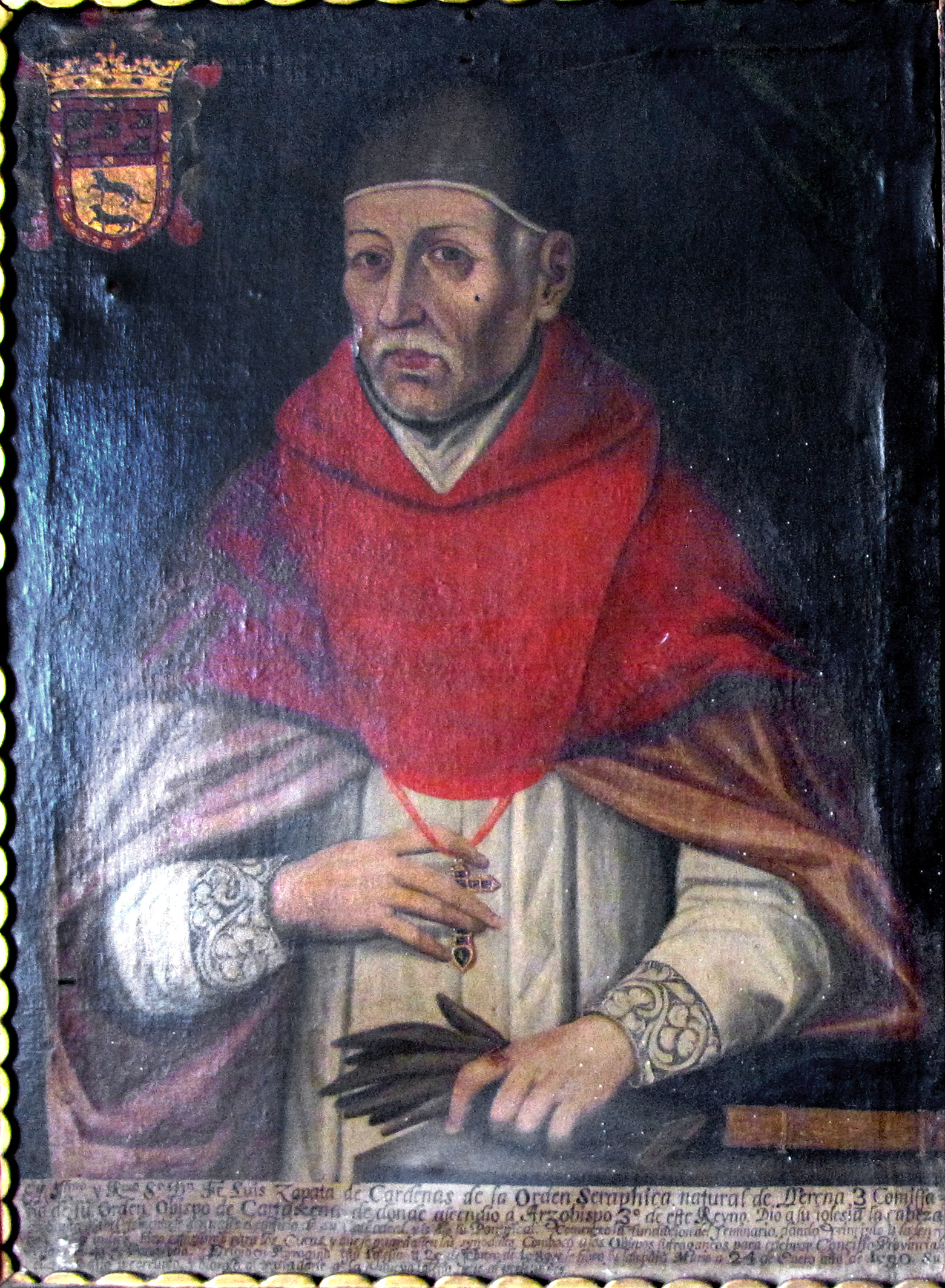
- Church: Catholic Church
- Archdiocese: Archdiocese of Santafé en Nueva Granada
- In office: 1570–1590
- Predecessor: Juan de los Barrios
- Successor: Alfonso López de Avila

Orders
- Consecration: May 1571 by Giovanni Battista Castagna

Personal details
- Born: 1515 Llerena, Spain
- Died: 24 February 1590 (aged 79–80) Bogotá

Friar Luis Zapata de Cárdenas, O.F.M. Rec. (1515 – 24 February 1590) was a Roman Catholic prelate who served as Archbishop of Santafé de Bogotá, capital of the New Kingdom of Granada (1573–1590).

== Biography ==
Luis Zapata de Cárdenas was born in Llerena, Spain, in 1515. His father, Rodrigo de Cárdenas, was Comendador de Oliva in the Order of Santiago.

Zapata served in the armies of Charles V in the Holy Roman Empire and Flanders. He rose to the ranks of maestre de campo and became a member of the Order of Santiago.

He left the military and became a friar in a Franciscan convent of San Ildefonso in Hornachos, which had recently been reconquered by Christian armies from Muslim rule. He became Superior (guardián) over multiple monasteries in the same province.

In 1560, the Franciscan Order named Zapata General Commissary for Peru. He arrived in South America in 1561 with fifty friars. He returned to Spain in 1565, serving as Provincial in the Franciscan province of San Miguel (Extremadura) between 1566 and 1572.

In 1569, Philip II named Zapata the first bishop of Cartagena de Indias, but Zapata declined the position.

On 8 November 1570 he was appointed during the papacy of Pope Pius V as Archbishop of Santafé en Nueva Granada. In May 1571, he was consecrated bishop by Giovanni Battista Castagna, Archbishop of Rossano. He arrived in Santafé in 1573, serving as Archbishop of Santafé en Nueva Granada until his death on 24 Feb 1590. As archbishop, he published pro-indigenous statements and ordained mestizos.

While bishop, he was the principal consecrator of Dionisio de Santos, Bishop of Cartagena (1575).

== Literature ==
- Hildegard Ernst (1999). "Zapata de Cardenas, Luis". In Bautz, Traugott (ed.). Biographisch-Bibliographisches Kirchenlexikon (BBKL) (in German). Vol. 15. Herzberg: Bautz. cols. 1555–1556. ISBN 3-88309-077-8.

== External links and additional sources ==
- Cheney, David M. "Archdiocese of Bogotá". Catholic-Hierarchy.org. (for Chronology of Bishops) ^{[self-published]}
- Chow, Gabriel. "Metropolitan Archdiocese of Bogotá (Colombia)". GCatholic.org. (for Chronology of Bishops) ^{[self-published]}

Catholic Church titles
| Preceded by Juan de los Barrios | Archbishop of Santafé en Nueva Granada; 1570–1590 | Succeeded by Alfonso López de Avila |
