= Metropolitan Cathedral of Panama City =

Metropolitan Archcathedral Basilica of Santa María la Antigua
- Primate Metropolitan Archcathedral Basilica Santa María la Antigua
- Catedral Primada Basílica Santa María la Antigua de Panamá
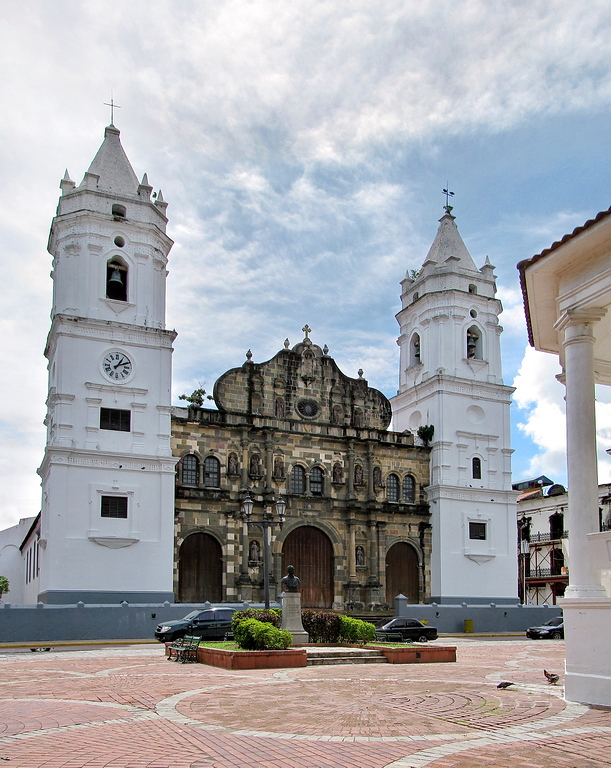
- Façade of the cathedral seen from the "Plaza de la Independencia" (Independence Square)
- Metropolitan Archcathedral Basilica of Santa María la Antigua
- 8.9525°N 79.5352°W
- Location: Casco Antiguo, Panama City
- Country: Panama
- Denomination: Roman Catholic Church

History
- Status: Metropolitan Archcathedral, Minor basilica
- Consecrated: 1796

Architecture
- Heritage designation: National Cultural Heritage
- Architect: military engineer Nicolás Rodríguez
- Architectural type: Renaissance
- Years built: 1688–1796
- Groundbreaking: 1688

Administration
- Archdiocese: Metropolitan Archdiocese of Panama

The Metropolitan Archcathedral Basilica of Santa María la Antigua (Spanish: Catedral Basílica Santa María la Antigua de Panamá) is a Catholic church located in the old town of Panama City in Panama. It was consecrated in 1796, although construction work began in 1688, 108 years earlier. It was designed by the military engineer Nicolás Rodríguez. The archcathedral is the episcopal see of the Metropolitan Archdiocese of Panama.

== History ==
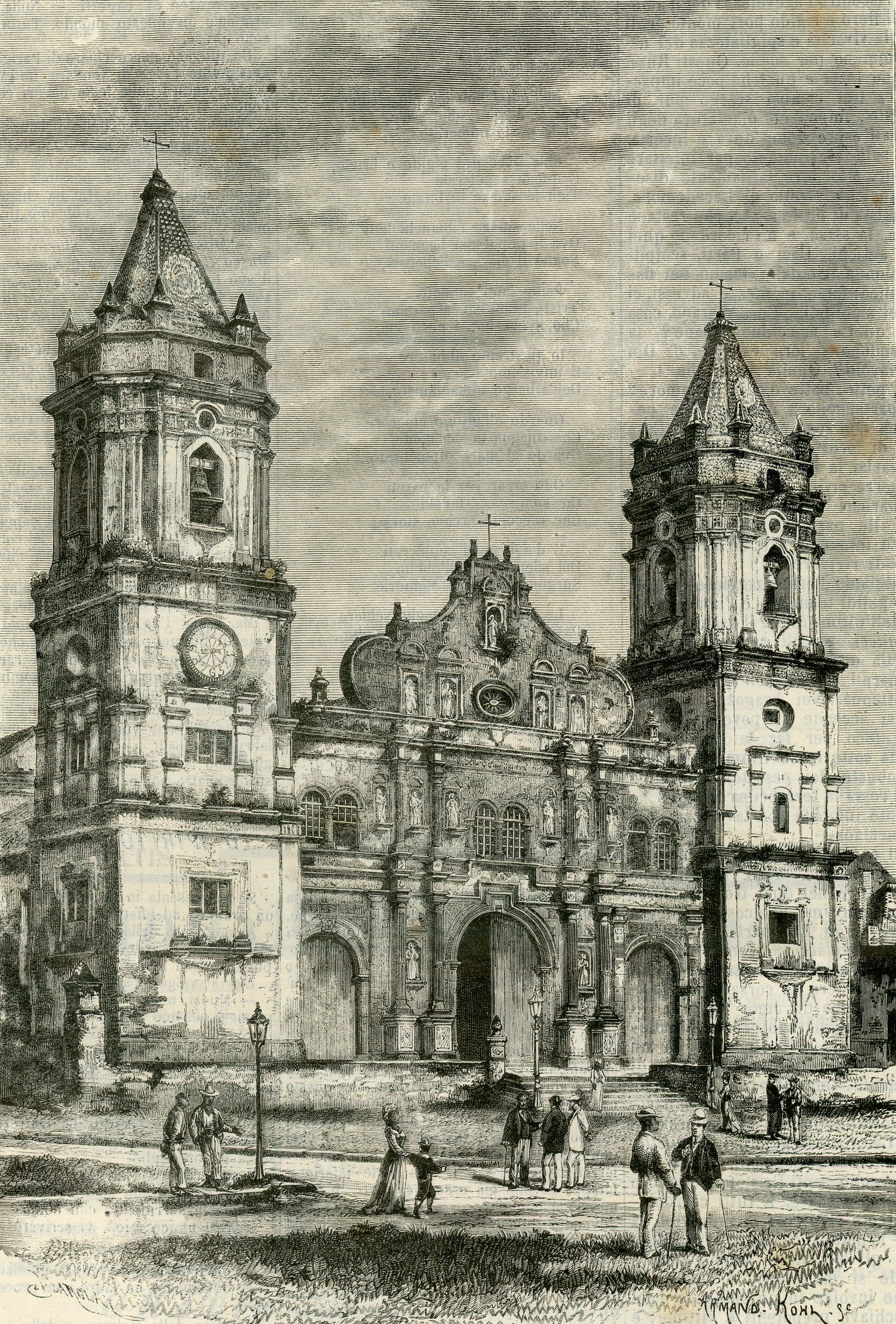
Wood-engraving of the Panama Metropolitan Cathedral in 1882, in the L’illustrazione popolare, Fratelli Treves Editori – Milano

Photograph of the Metropolitan Cathedral in 1904, note in the background the Ancón Hill, a peak that is located in the surroundings of Panama City

The Metropolitan Archcathedral of Panama is heir to the cathedral erected by Pope Adrian VI in the great house of Cacique Cémaco, when the Spanish confronted him and offered to found a town dedicated to Saint Mary of la Antigua, in 1510. In 1513 it was dictates the bull by which La Antigua is elevated to the rank of diocese, and its church to the rank of cathedral, being its first bishop Friar Juan de Quevedo.

After Santa María la Antigua del Darién was abandoned by order of Pedro Arias Dávila, who in 1519 had founded Panama on the shores of the South Sea, the cathedral of the new town inherited the transfer of insignia, bulls and relics from la Antigua del Darién. After Henry Morgan had sacked Panama in 1671, the city was transferred to the current Casco Antiguo of Panama City in 1673 and with this transfer the erection of a new cathedral was arranged, whose construction took 108 years, that is, from 1688 to 1796.

During the Republican era, the cathedral was the setting for the funeral obsequies of the presidents of the republic, countless weddings and religious acts.

== Architectural structure ==
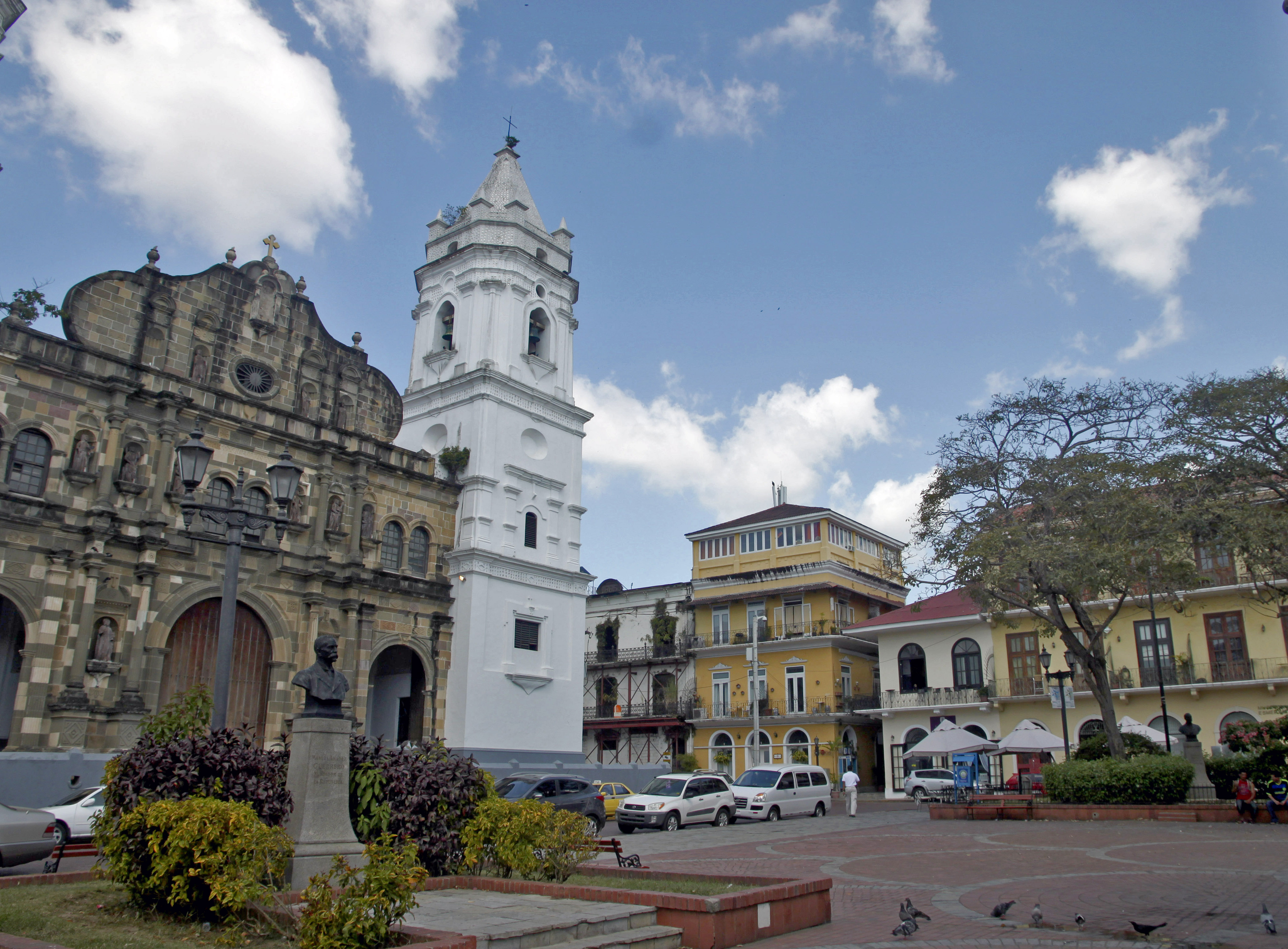
View of the Plaza de la Catedral

It is a large building, with a high gabled roof. It has two plastered towers, once painted red on top, inlaid with mother-of-pearl that were considered the tallest in Panama for a long time. The walls are made of stone, the façade is carved in the Renaissance style with classical elements of decoration (usually called Jesuit style). It has three naves that are directly accessed through three doors from the façade. There are two other chapel naves that are missing the respective divisions.

The roof is supported by a veritable forest of about 67 cruciform columns made of stone and brick. The sanctuary and the Christ statue are seven steps above the level of the naves and although everything is painted white, that section, at the top, is painted in light blue, colors of the Virgin.

Its main altarpiece is a work from the end of the 19th century, very possibly made by French masters who worked for the construction of the Interoceanic Canal. From Darién to Panamá Viejo and from there to the current site, came the relics brought from Seville of Saint Aurelio of Córdoba and Saint Getulius, in both cases, complete remains. The bells of the cathedral tower of Panama Viejo were rendered useless when they partially melted in the fire of 1737, so the bells that it now bears were made in the eighteenth century, as gifts from former Panamanian bishops who had been transferred to South America.

It has a wide sacristy, once on two levels, the only Panamanian colonial building with a dome. Under the sanctuary-most holy there are two vaulted rooms, the Crypt of the Bishops. From the sacristy it was possible to access another lower room where the archives of the cathedral rested.

It has 10 large and tall windows that have been enriched since the beginning of the twentieth century with beautiful stained glass windows influenced by l'art decorative. The current lamps, made of gilded bronze with a traditional design, were donated by the Archdiocese of Rio de Janeiro. The cathedral stands on the west side of the Plaza Mayor. It is surrounded by a wide hillock 6 steps above street level and one more step to enter the temple.

== Elevated to Basilica ==
On December 22, 2014, the Archbishop of Panama José Domingo Ulloa Mendieta announced that the Dicastery for Divine Worship and the Discipline of the Sacraments conferred on the metropolitan cathedral the title of minor basilica, with all the tasks and obligations that this entails in the liturgical and pastoral sphere. The title was granted after a request from the Panamanian episcopal conference. From now on it bears the title of Cathedral Basilica Santa María la Antigua.

== Devotion to Santa María la Antigua ==
The cathedral and the Archdiocese of Panamá is dedicated to the Blessed Virgin Mary as "Our Lady of the Ancient." (Spanish: Nuestra Señora de la Antigua) The devotion originated with an image venerated in Seville Cathedral.

On May 31, 2025, the Dicastery for Divine Worship and the Discipline of the Sacraments granted the pontifical decree of canonical coronation to the venerated Marian image in the Cathedral Basilica, marking the first decree of coronation in the name and by the authority of Pope Leo XIV.

The coronation took place on September 9, 2025, in commemoration of the centenary of the elevation as an archdiocese. His Excellency, Most Reverend José Ángel Saiz Meneses, Archbishop of Seville presided over the ceremony and placed the crown on the image. Upon its coronation ceremony, it became the second Marian image in the country to receive a pontifical coronation, following Our Lady of Mercy which was crowned in 2018.

== See also ==
- Roman Catholicism in Panama
- St. Mary Cathedral (disambiguation)

== Notes ==
A paragraph taken from Narrative of the Voyage of H.M.S. Herald, published in London, in 1853, reads as follows:

The cathedral [of Panama City] is a fine edifice, occupying nearly the whole western side of the Plaza del Catedral; it is built in the old Spanish style, and has on its eastern facing two spires, and several statues, representing the Virgin Mary and the Apostles. It is rich in church ornaments; the decorations are tasteless, and the paintings, excepting the portraits of the Panamian bishops, which possess some historical interest, without any value.
