= Panama Truth Commission =

Investigation of alleged military crimes

The Panama Truth Commission was appointed by Panamanian president Mireya Moscoso in 2000 to investigate crimes committed under the military rule of Omar Torrijos and Manuel Noriega.

In December 2000, human remains were discovered at a Panamanian National Guard base, incorrectly believed to be those of Jesús Héctor Gallego Herrera, a priest murdered during the Torrijos dictatorship. Moscoso appointed a truth commission to investigate the site and those at other bases. The commission faced opposition from the Democratic Revolutionary Party (PRD), which had been the party of both Torrijos and Noriega. The PRD-controlled National Assembly slashed the commission's funding, and PRD president Balbina Herrera threatened to seek legal action against the president for its creation. The commission ultimately reported on 110 of the 148 cases it examined, of which 40 had disappeared and 70 were known to be murdered. The report concluded that the Noriega government had engaged in "torture [and] cruel, inhuman, and degrading treatment", and recommended further exhumation and investigation.

== Background ==
In 1981, General Omar Torrijos was killed in a plane crash and his defense force leader General Manuel Noriega took power. During this period the United States still controlled the Canal Zone and had immense influence in various areas of the country (including economic influence). Six years into Noriega’s rule, the United States decided to cut its economic assistance to Panama.

In 1989, Noriega influenced the election a great deal since most Panamanians wanted to rid the country of military rule. This led to riots and instability, which caused the United States to send in troops. The US responded quickly to these riots and were able to use military force to crush the riots and rebellions. This was due to US-Panamanian treaties involving the Canal Zone. The result of US military involvement led to the arrest of Noriega. He was sentenced for forty-years on charges for drug trafficking. Finally in 2001, President Mireya Moscoso – widow to former President Arnulfo Arias Madrid – established the truth commission after the discovery of bones at several military bases.

=== Noriega, the dictator ===
The reasoning behind the Panamanian Truth commission was to hold the dictator General Manuel Antonio Noriega accountable for his abuses of human rights as well as his involvement in drug trafficking and money laundering. Some Panamanians believe that the United States should be held responsible for Noriega’s regime and that they should be liable for the outcomes of the Panama Truth Commission. The US involvement with Noriega began in the early 1970s when he became involved with US Intelligence activities. One event in 1971 had President Richard Nixon requesting that Noriega travel to Havana, Cuba on behalf of the US to obtain two American ships that had been seized by Fidel Castro's government. During this time Noriega was already involved in drug deals and drug trafficking and President Nixon received a recommendation from a high ranking drug-officer to have Noriega assassinated rather than working with him. The assassination never occurred and Noriega through his blossoming career became the second most powerful man by 1975 through leading the G-2 (Panama's military intelligence command).

From the late 1970s to the early 1980s, Noriega served US interests quite effectively. His service was seen in the form of asylum in Panama for the Shah of Iran in 1979 and also aiding in destabilizing the Sandinista government in Nicaragua in 1983. The involvement with the US benefited Noriega equally when in 1981 General Omar Torrijos was involved in an unexplained plane crash. It is alleged that Noriega used his connection with the US to engineer General Torrijos' death through the support of the C.I.A. (Central Intelligence Agency). After the death of General Torrijos his seat of power was fought for by both politicians and military officers. This struggle for power was eventually won by Noriega. After taking total control Noriega was promoted to General and Commander of the National Guard. He decided in 1983 to amalgamate both the Navy and the Air Force which would establish the Panama Defence Forces – this included the national police.

The following year the dictatorial regime, due to a previous agreement with the United States before signing the Canal Treaties held a national election to appoint a president. His nomination was Nicolas Arditos Barletta, who ran against Arnulfo Arias. Barletta narrowly won, promising to help improve the country's economy. When Barletta failed to do so, Noriega forced him out of power. At the time of this election Noriega was suspected of money laundering, gun trafficking, torture, murder and selling US intelligence to Cuba and Easter European governments. When approached by the US, Noriega denied all allegations and blaming US politicians of trying to undermine the Panama Canal treaties before its return to Panamanian control in December 1999. Noriega's support began to decline in 1987 when his former chief of staff stated that Noriega had fixed the 1984 elections and had Hugo Spadafora – a critic of Noriega's drug trafficking – ordered to be killed. When this became public knowledge, Panamanians began to protest the removal of Noriega. His response to these protests was to declare a national emergency, which suspended all constitutional rights, close newspapers and radio stations and exile his political enemies. Even though Noriega had connections with the United States, they always remained distant from Noriega's government. This all took a sudden turn in 1988 when the US decided to become more directly involved in Panama.

=== United States involvement ===
By mid-1987, the United States government decided that Noriega was becoming too powerful and damaging for the Panamanian society. Under President Ronald Reagan's administration, the US terminated all economic and military assistance and encouraged Panamanian bankers to cut support funding as well. The only support left for Noriega was the Panama Defence Force. The US also suggested that Noriega resign and depart Panama before the US elections of 1988. In addition to these suggestions, the US Justice Department began filling charges against Noriega as a warning. The US even sent Assistant Secretary of State Elliot Abrams to Panama to discuss plans with President Eric Del Valle to fire Noriega. Noriega's response was to depose Del Valle.

In 1989, now under President George Bush (who was the director of the C.I.A. when Noriega became involved with the US), began to increase pressure on Noriega. This pressure was visible when a Panamanian election was called and Noriega decided not to run but instead endorsed candidate Carlos Duque. The opposition chose Guillermo Endara and he was endorsed with $10 million by the Bush administration. During this election, Noriega found that Duque was losing and commanded the Panama Defence Force to confiscate ballot boxes. Noriega declared this election void and appointed another president. The US began to worry greatly given that control of the Panama Canal was going to be handed over in ten years time. They did not want to see one of Noriega's men as administrator of the Canal, not only for the country but also for the Panamanian image internationally.

After the contested election, President Bush sent in US forces to overthrow Noriega on the grounds that hostile acts were performed against US military personnel. Noriega declared a state of war and the US launched an attack called "Operation Just Cause" with 24,000 troops. The fighting lasted several days and Noriega hid at the Papal Nunciature office during this time. Finally, after pressure from Vatican officials Noriega surrendered in January 1990.

== The Commission ==
=== Mandate and structure ===
The Truth Commission in Panama was called the Comisión de la Verdad de Panamá (Panama Truth Commission). It was established on January 18, 2001 by President Mireya Moscoso with a mandate to investigate human rights violations between 1968 and 1989, the years of rule by Torrijos and Noriega. The commission was barred from making any conclusions on legal responsibilities of individual perpetrators.

The commission was made up of seven commissioners (five men and two women). It was led by Alberto Santiago Almanza Henríquez, a lawyer and Catholic activist. All commissioners were appointed by President Moscoso. The commission last for a year and three months and came to an end in April 2002 when the Final Report (Informe Final de la Comisión de la Verdad de Panamá) was presented. A follow-up office operated until December 2004.

=== Findings ===
According to the commission's findings, the military regime was involved in torture and cruel, inhuman and degrading treatment of victims. There had been 148 cases of human rights abuse. Out of those, 110 were reported and documented. The cases took place during the first years of the military regime (1968–1972) against supporters of the former President Arias. It was discovered that seventy of the victims had been murdered, forty had disappeared and that another forty cases were yet to be investigated.

A major aspect of the commission's work was investigating clandestine grave sites, establishing the identity of victims and determining the circumstances of their deaths. Through this investigation, the commission discovered twenty-four grave sites and excavated thirty-six graves. These sites were located at military establishments throughout the provinces of Panama and Bosca del Toro and at the prison on Coiba Island. Other sites included the Tocumen military airport, the houses occupied by Panamanian Air Force pilots, the old Los Pumas infantry barracks and firing range in Tocumen, the old cavalry base in Panama Viejo, the Joyita prison in Pacova and at houses used by secret police and other security units used for interrogation and torture.

The discovery of the body of Colombian priest Jose Hector Gallego, who had been abducted by the military in 1971, is what initiated the Truth Commission. Other well-known people that were found to be victims of torture included Dora Moreno, Hipólito Quintero, Floyd Britton, Encarnación González and Hugo Spadofora. The final conclusion that was made by the commission was that "the military regime had engaged in 'torture [and] cruel, inhuman, and degrading treatment' of its victims."

=== Recommendations, reforms & prosecutions ===
The recommendations made by the commission to the President were as follows:

1. To continue systematic excavations of suspected grave sites.
2. To reactivate the Special Prosecutor office as a way to take legal action against those who performed the atrocities.
3. That the government accept the obligations of international law relating to human rights by compensating the families of victims.
4. To create a permanent government agency that would continue the work of the commission as a way to maintain their files.
5. To have strict civilian control of the National police and other internal public security forces.
6. To improve human rights education in schools.
7. To put vigorous effort into disseminating the commission's report.

A follow-up committee for the commission's work was created. It was decided by executive decree on October 20, 2003 that the truth commission was to be extended until December 2004. This follow-up commission was called the Office for Follow-up of the Institutional Truth Commission or Comisión Institucional de la Verdad-Oficina de Seguimiento. This office would report to the President and the Minister of Justice. Towards the end of the commission's existence, the office experienced a break-in upon its completion of the report. It is believed that the thief was trying to destroy any and all records, to make them unavailable to public access. This commission also experienced obstacles like budgetary restraints which affected its efforts to pay reparations, and the commission was unable to answer questions concerning the victims of the 1989 United States invasion. The Panamanian government has demanded that Washington declassify information that would be relevant to the US invasion, Operation Just Cause. These types of files have proven to be invaluable when understanding dictatorships in other countries like El Salvador, Chile and Guatemala and the role that the US played in backing them.

The persecutions that have been made are directed at General Noriega and come from various countries. He was first charged in 1992 was for drug trafficking by the United States and sentenced to forty years imprisonment. This sentence was eventually reduced to twenty years. Following this sentence in 1995, Panamanian courts found Noriega to be guilty of murder during his dictatorship. This sentence encouraged Panama to demand Noriega be extradited from the US to complete his persecution time on his national soil; this demand was declined by the US. In April 2010, the US decided to extradite Noriega to France where he was charged for money laundering, convicted in 1999, and sentenced to serve thirty years. The President at the time, Martin Torrijos – General Torrijos' son – called for Noriega's extradition to Panama.

== Legacy ==
As a way to commemorate the twenty-fifth anniversary President Juan Carlos Varela announced the creation of a commission to investigate the deaths and disappearances during Operation Just Cause. This commission's goal is to "heal the wounds, and promote national reconciliation." The Panamanian government is demanding Washington recognize the invasion, provide compensation to the country and proclaim the grave sites where hundreds of Panamanians were buried. President Varela also announced that December 20 would be a day of national mourning for the victims.
