= Juan de los Barrios =

Spanish Roman Catholic prelate

Most Reverend Juan de los Barrios
- Archbishop of Santafé de Bogotá of the New Kingdom of Granada
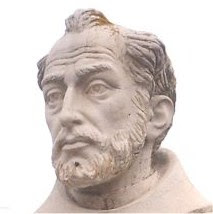
- Church: Catholic Church
- Archdiocese: Archdiocese of Santafé de Bogotá of the New Kingdom of Granada
- In office: 1564–1569
- Predecessor: None
- Successor: Luis Zapata de Cárdenas
- Previous posts: Bishop of Paraguay (1547–1552); Bishop of Santa Marta (1552–1564)

Orders
- Consecration: by Juan Martínez Silíceo

Personal details
- Born: 1496 Villa de Peloche, Spain
- Died: February 12, 1569 (age 73)

Friar Juan de los Barrios y Toledo, OFM (1496 – February 12, 1569) was a Roman Catholic prelate who served as the first Archbishop of Santafé de Bogotá of the New Kingdom of Granada, (1564–1569), Bishop of Santa Marta (1552–1564), and the first Bishop of Paraguay (1547–1552).

== Biography ==
Juan de los Barrios was born in Villa de Peloche, Spain and ordained a priest in the Order of Friars Minor. On July 1, 1547, Pope Paul III appointed him the first Bishop of Paraguay. He was consecrated by Juan Martínez Silíceo, Archbishop of Toledo. On April 2, 1552, he was appointed by Pope Julius III as Bishop of Santa Marta. On March 22, 1564, Pope Pius IV appointed him the first Archbishop of Santafé en Nueva Granada. He died on February 12, 1569.

While bishop, he was the principal consecrator of Juan de Simancas Simancas, Bishop of Cartagena and Pedro de Ágreda Sánchez Martín, Bishop of Coro.

== See also ==
- Catholic Church in Colombia

== External links and additional sources ==
- Cheney, David M. "Archdiocese of Asunción". Catholic-Hierarchy.org. (for Chronology of Bishops) ^{[self-published]}
- Chow, Gabriel. "Metropolitan Archdiocese of Asunción (Paraguay)". GCatholic.org. (for Chronology of Bishops) ^{[self-published]}
- Cheney, David M. "Diocese of Santa Marta". Catholic-Hierarchy.org. (for Chronology of Bishops) ^{[self-published]}
- Chow, Gabriel. "Metropolitan Diocese of Santa Marta (Colombia)". GCatholic.org. (for Chronology of Bishops) ^{[self-published]}
- Cheney, David M. "Archdiocese of Bogotá". Catholic-Hierarchy.org. (for Chronology of Bishops) ^{[self-published]}
- Chow, Gabriel. "Metropolitan Archdiocese of Bogotá (Colombia)". GCatholic.org. (for Chronology of Bishops) ^{[self-published]}

Catholic Church titles
Preceded by None	Bishop of Paraguay; 1547–1552	Succeeded by Pedro de la Torre
Preceded by Martín de Calatayud	Bishop of Santa Marta; 1552–1564	Succeeded by Juan Méndez de Villafranca
Preceded by None	Archbishop of Santafé en Nueva Granada; 1564–1569	Succeeded by Luis Zapata de Cárdenas
