= Cristóbal Martínez de Salas =

Spanish Catholic prelate

Most Reverend Cristóbal Martínez de Salas
- Bishop of Panamá
- Church: Catholic Church
- Diocese: Diocese of Panamá
- In office: 1625–1640
- Predecessor: Francisco de la Cámara y Raya
- Successor: Hernando de Ramírez y Sánchez

Orders
- Consecration: January 18, 1626 by Alfonso López Gallo

Personal details
- Born: 1572 Medina del Campo, Spain
- Died: October 22, 1640 (age 68) Panama City

Cristóbal Martínez de Salas (1572 – October 22, 1640) was a Catholic prelate who served as Bishop of Panamá (1625–1640).

== Biography ==
Cristóbal Martínez de Salas was born in Medina del Campo, Spain and ordained a priest in the Order of Canons Regular of Prémontré. On May 10, 1625, Pope Urban VIII, appointed him Bishop of Panamá. On January 18, 1626, he was consecrated bishop by Alfonso López Gallo, Bishop of Valladolid with Miguel Ayala, Bishop of Palencia and Juan López, Bishop of Monopoli as Co-Consecrators. He served as Bishop of Panamá until his death on October 22, 1640.

== External links and additional sources ==
- Cheney, David M. "Archdiocese of Panamá". Catholic-Hierarchy.org. (for Chronology of Bishops) ^{[self-published]}
- Chow, Gabriel. "Metropolitan Archdiocese of Panamá". GCatholic.org. (for Chronology of Bishops) ^{[self-published]}

Religious titles
Preceded by Francisco de la Cámara y Raya	Bishop of Panamá; 1625–1640	Succeeded by Hernando de Ramírez y Sánchez
