= Hernando de Ramírez y Sánchez =

Spanish Roman Catholic prelate

Most Reverend Hernando de Ramírez y Sánchez
- Bishop of Panamá
- Church: Catholic Church
- Diocese: Diocese of Panamá
- Predecessor: Cristóbal Martínez de Salas
- Successor: Bernardo de Izaguirre de los Reyes

Orders
- Consecration: February 9, 1642 by Diego Castejón Fonseca

Personal details
- Born: 1580 Arroyo de la Luz, Spain
- Died: April 11, 1652 (age 72) Panama City

Hernando de Ramírez y Sánchez (1580 – April 11, 1652) was a Roman Catholic prelate who served as Bishop of Panamá (1641–1652).

== Biography ==
Hernando de Ramírez y Sánchez was born in Arroyo de la Luz, Spain and ordained a priest in the Order of the Most Holy Trinity. On June 1, 1641, Pope Urban VIII, appointed him Bishop of Panamá. On February 9, 1642, he was consecrated bishop by Diego Castejón Fonseca, Bishop Emeritus of Lugo with Miguel Avellán, Auxiliary Bishop of Toledo and Timoteo Pérez Vargas, Archbishop Emeritus of Ispahan as Co-Consecrators. He served as Bishop of Panamá until his death on April 11, 1652.

While bishop, he was the principal consecrator of Alonso de Briceño, Bishop of Nicaragua.

== External links and additional sources ==
- Cheney, David M. "Archdiocese of Panamá". Catholic-Hierarchy.org. (for Chronology of Bishops) ^{[self-published]}
- Chow, Gabriel. "Metropolitan Archdiocese of Panamá". GCatholic.org. (for Chronology of Bishops) ^{[self-published]}

Catholic Church titles
| Preceded by Cristóbal Martínez de Salas | Bishop of Panamá; 1641–1652 | Succeeded by Bernardo de Izaguirre de los Reyes |
