= Vicente de Valverde =

Spanish bishop

Most Reverend Vicente de Valverde
- Bishop of Panama
- Church: Catholic Church
- Diocese: Diocese of Panama.
- In office: 1533–1534
- Predecessor: Martin de Bejar
- Successor: Tomás de Berlanga

Orders
- Consecration: 1533

Personal details
- Born: 1490 Segovia, Spain
- Died: 1543 (age 53)

Vicente de Valverde, O.P. (1490–1543) served as the fourth Bishop of Panama (1533–1534).

== Biography ==
Vicente de Valverde was born in Segovia, Spain and ordained a priest in the Order of Preachers. In 1533, Pope Clement VII appointed him Bishop of Panama. He died in 1543.

== External links and additional sources ==
- Cheney, David M. "Archdiocese of Panamá". Catholic-Hierarchy.org. (for Chronology of Bishops) ^{[self-published]}
- Chow, Gabriel. "Metropolitan Archdiocese of Panamá". GCatholic.org. (for Chronology of Bishops) ^{[self-published]}

Religious titles
Preceded by Martin de Bejar	Bishop of Panamá; 1533–1534	Succeeded by Tomás de Berlanga
