= Marcos G. McGrath =

Panamanian-American Catholic bishop (1924–2000)

The Most Reverend Marcos G. McGrath CSC
- Archbishop of Panama
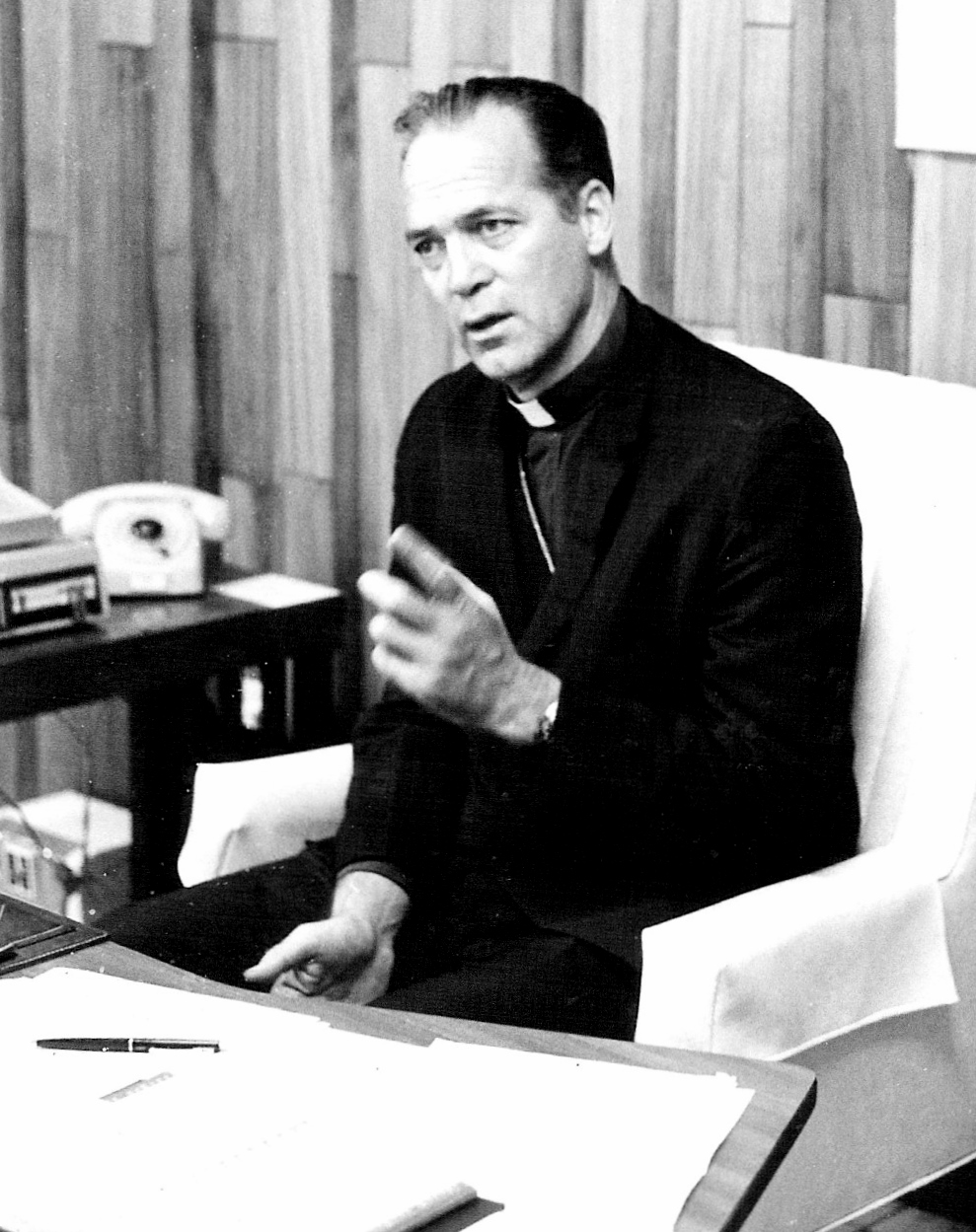
- Native name: Mark Gregory McGrath
- Church: Catholic
- Archdiocese: Panama
- See: Caeciri
- Appointed: 17 August 1961
- Predecessor: Tomas Alberto Clavel Méndez
- Successor: José Dimas Cedeño Delgado
- Other posts: Dean of Theology, Pontifical Catholic University of Chile; Auxiliary Bishop of Panama; Bishop of Santiago de Veraguas

Orders
- Ordination: 11 June 1949 by José María Preciado y Nieva
- Consecration: 17 August 1961 by Francisco Beckmann

Personal details
- Born: Mark Gregory McGrath; 10 February 1924 Ancón, Panama
- Died: 4 August 2000 (aged 76) Panama City, Panama
- Education: La Salle Military Academy; Pontifical Catholic University of Chile; University of Notre Dame; Catholic University of America; Pontifical University of Saint Thomas Aquinas

Mark Gregory "Marcos Gregorio" McGrath, CSC (10 February 1924 – 4 August 2000), was an American-Panamanian Catholic prelate and priest of the Congregation of Holy Cross who served as the archbishop of the Archdiocese of Panamá and was a Council Father of the Second Vatican Council. He advocated for the return of the Panama Canal Zone to Panama and opposed the regime of Manuel Noriega.

== Early life ==
McGrath was born in Ancón, Panama, on 10 February 1924, to John Thomas McGrath of Trenton, New Jersey, and Louise Renauld of Cartago, Costa Rica. His father came to Panama in 1912 to work on the Panama Canal, eventually serving as the captain of a dredge boat. Louise and John had four sons—John, Robert, Eugene, and Mark—before an accident killed John in 1928.

McGrath attended various schools in both Latin America and the United States, before graduating from La Salle Military Academy in New York in 1939. He briefly studied at the Pontifical Catholic University of Chile from 1939 to 1940 before enrolling at the University of Notre Dame from 1940 to 1942. During his time there, he encountered the thought of Catholic Action and the Young Christian Workers through the influence of Fr. Louis Putz CSC, who in turn had been influenced by Joseph Cardijn. He also became interested in current events in Latin America, attending international conferences regarding the region and speaking on the topic frequently after becoming a member of the Notre Dame Speaker's Bureau.

In August 1942, McGrath entered the novitiate of the Congregation of Holy Cross at Notre Dame and made first vows in September 1943. Continuing studies at Notre Dame, he earned his bachelor's degree in philosophy in 1945 and then studied graduate theology at Holy Cross College, which was attached to the Catholic University of America. Upon completion of these studies, he was ordained to the priesthood on 11 June 1949 in the Cathedral Basilica of St. Mary by Bishop José María Preciado y Nieva. He also renounced his American citizenship to become a naturalized Panamanian citizen.

== Priesthood ==
His superiors sent him to the Theological Institute of Paris (1949–1950), and then to the Angelicum of Rome (1950–1953) for advanced studies in theology. In Rome he obtained his doctorate with a thesis qualified as magna cum laude entitled The First Vatican Council's Teaching on the Evolution of the Dogma. It was also during this time that he encountered many of the thinkers and philosophies which would be of great influence to the Church in the coming decades -- Yves Congar, Henri de Lubac, Karl Rahner, Romano Guardini, the Liturgical Movement, Personalism, and Christian humanism among them, along with the aforementioned philosophies of the JOC and Catholic Action.

In April 1953, the Holy Cross Fathers assigned Fr. McGrath to St. George College, an all-boys' school in Santiago, Chile which the religious order ran, to be dean of Theology and to teach Fundamental theology at the Pontifical University. He was dedicated to the work of social justice and of raising awareness of socioeconomic inequality among students. He engaged both high school students from St. George and college students from the university in opening first aid clinics, visiting families, and operating food discount stores, as well as formation in Catholic social teaching.

Also at this time, McGrath, in his role as dean of the school of theology, noticed the lack of dialogue between the theological faculty and the other disciplines at the Catholic University, as well as a lack of training of the professors of theology. To remedy this, he created the Higher Institute for Religious Culture, Theological Weeks, and the journal Teologia y Vida.

== Episcopacy ==
=== Auxiliary Bishop of Panama ===
On 17 August 1961, Pope John XXIII named McGrath an auxiliary bishop of the Archdiocese of Panamá and titular bishop of Caeciri, and McGrath was consecrated to the episcopacy on 8 October 1961 by Francisco Beckmann in the Panama Cathedral. McGrath described his time as auxiliary as a "rebirth and rebaptism into our Panamanian situation". He engaged in pastoral visits and study groups regarding Vatican II, and became vicar capitular of the archdiocese upon Beckmann's death in October 1963.

During the Flag Incident protests in Panama, he urged U.S. officials to "perceive more clearly the ideals of the Latin American peoples", served as a voice of support to the claims of Panamanians in the face of what he described as an abuse of Panamanian rights, and coordinated efforts among local religious leaders to serve as peacemakers.

=== Vatican II Father ===
Soon after being consecrated a bishop, McGrath was named to the Committee on Doctrine, and travelled to Rome frequently for the duration of the council. He was a major contributor to Gaudium et spes, imbuing it with the thought of Joseph Cardijn in regards to the "see, judge, act" method as well as a theology of the signs of the time, and the dignity of the laity by virtue of their baptism. His interventions are also observable in Sacrosanctum Concilium, Lumen gentium, and Ad gentes.

=== Bishop of Santiago de Veraguas ===
In March 1964, Bishop McGrath was made the first bishop of the newly erected Diocese of Santiago de Veraguas, a time which he described as "novitiate for me, my fundamental formation in the work of being a bishop," he would later recount. "It also provided daily contact with the poverty in Panama, with the poorest: the rural and the indigenous." He also began work on a new diocesan chancery building.

A priest serving in the diocese, Jesús Héctor Gallego Herrera, was abducted and killed by soldiers after angering landowners and military officials shortly after McGrath became archbishop of Panama. Gallego had been ordained to the priesthood by McGrath, and came from Colombia to work in Santiago de Verguas during McGrath's episcopacy.

=== Archbishop of Panama ===
On 5 February 1969, McGrath was appointed archbishop of Panama. He continued to be a strong voice in favor of the independence of Panama, especially in the context of the dispute over the Panama Canal Zone, in which he was born. The archbishop also served as an advocate for a return to democracy and a defender of human rights, especially during and after the 1968 Panamanian coup d'état and the administration of Manuel Noriega. His criticism of the latter resulted in threats and surveillance, as he was one of the few public critics of the regime.

He also assisted in negotiations surrounding Noriega's surrender following the United States invasion of Panama, and was granted permission to enter Noriega's "witch house" and other residences to "gain insight into the man's soul". He reported evidence of torture, devil worship, and voodoo. He was also the president of the Panama Truth Commission in 1990.

He also served as secretary-general and vice-president of the Episcopal Conference of Latin America, and gave important addresses at its second meeting in Medellín and its third meeting in Puebla. In addition, he was a member of the Pontifical Council for Dialogue with Non-Believers, the Secretariat of the Synod of Bishops, and a consultant to the Pontifical Council for the Laity.

== Death ==
Due to complications from Parkinson's disease, McGrath submitted his resignation to Pope John Paul II in 1994. He died on 4 August 2000, in a retirement home in Panama City at the age of 76.
