= Pablo de Torres (bishop) =

Bishop of Panamá in 1546–1554

Most Reverend Pablo de Torres
- Bishop of Panamá
- Church: Catholic Church
- Diocese: Diocese of Panamá
- In office: 1546–1560
- Predecessor: Tomás de Berlanga
- Successor: Juan de Vaca

Personal details
- Born: Spain
- Died: 1560

Pablo de Torres (died 1560) was a Roman Catholic prelate who was Bishop of Panamá from 1546 to 1560.

== Biography ==
Pablo de Torres was born in Spain and ordained a priest in the Order of Preachers. On January 27, 1546, Pope Paul III appointed him Bishop of Panamá. On December 15, 1553, Jerónimo de Loayza, Archbishop of Lima, initiated a case for his removal from his duties due to administrative incompetency and the failure to protect the Indians from abuse and enslavement. Pablo de Torres returned to Rome in 1554 where he is said to have died in 1560.

== External links and additional sources ==
- Cheney, David M. "Archdiocese of Panamá". Catholic-Hierarchy. (for chronology of bishops) ^{[self-published]}
- Chow, Gabriel. "Metropolitan Archdiocese of Panamá". GCatholic. (for chronology of bishops) ^{[self-published]}

Religious titles
Preceded by Tomás de Berlanga	Bishop of Panamá; 1546–1560	Succeeded by Juan de Vaca
