= Vicente de Peraza =

Roman Catholic prelate

Most Reverend Vicente de Peraza
- Bishop of Panama
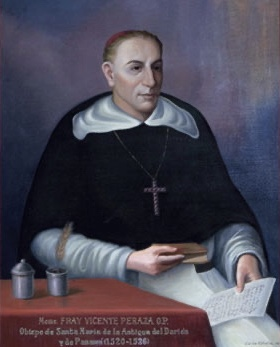
- Vicente de Peraza in a 16th century portrait.
- Church: Catholic Church
- Diocese: Diocese of Panama
- In office: 1520–1526
- Predecessor: Juan de Quevedo Villegas
- Successor: Martin de Bejar

Orders
- Consecration: April 1, 1521 by Francisco Bobadilla

Personal details
- Died: 1553

Vicente de Peraza (died 1553) was a Roman Catholic prelate who served as the second Bishop of Panamá (1520–1526).

== Biography ==
He was born in 1489, as Guillén de Peraza in the town of Betancuria, on the island of Fuerteventura. Although according to other sources, in Seville.
He was the son of Pedro Fernández de Saavedra and Constanza Sarmiento, she in turn the daughter of the Lords of the Canary Islands, Diego García de Herrera and Inés Peraza.

Vicente de Peraza was ordained a priest in the Order of Preachers. On December 5, 1520, Pope Leo X appointed him as the second Bishop of Panamá. On April 1, 1521, he was consecrated bishop by Francisco Bobadilla, Bishop of Salamanca with Paride de Grassis, Bishop of Pesaro as Co-Consecrator. In 1526, he resigned as Bishop of Panamá. He died in 1553.

== External links and additional sources ==
- Cheney, David M. "Archdiocese of Panamá". Catholic-Hierarchy.org. (for Chronology of Bishops) ^{[self-published]}
- Chow, Gabriel. "Metropolitan Archdiocese of Panamá". GCatholic.org. (for Chronology of Bishops) ^{[self-published]}

Religious titles
Preceded by Juan de Quevedo Villegas	Bishop of Panamá; 1520–1526	Succeeded by Martin de Bejar
