= MLN-29 =

November 29 National Liberation Movement Moviemiento de Liberacion Nacional 29 de Noviembre
- Abbreviation: MLN-29
- Founded: 1970
- Merger of: VAN; MUR
- Preceded by: FRP
- Ideology: Communism; Marxism–Leninism; Revolutionary socialism Anti-racism; Anti-sexism; Anti-imperialism

Party flag
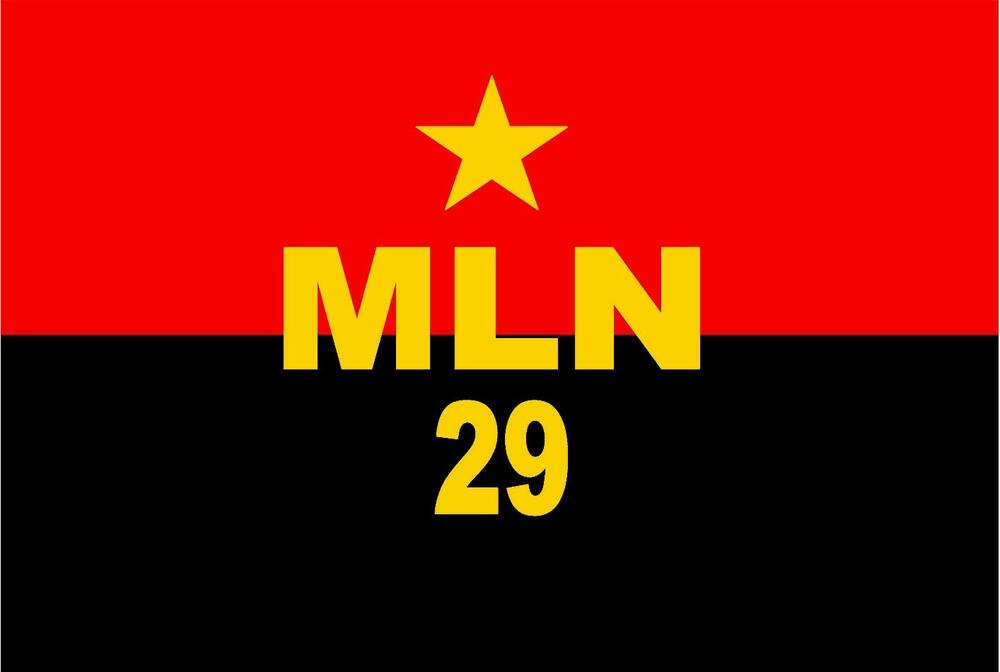

The November 29 National Liberation Movement (in Spanish: Movimiento de Liberación Nacional 29 de noviembre) (MLN-29) is a Marxist-Leninist party in Panama that was founded in 1970. The date in its name refers to the death of Panamanian communist leader Floyd Britton the year before.
