= Carlos María Ariz Bolea =

Carlos María Ariz Bolea C.M.F.
- Bishop of Colón-Kuna Yala
- Native name: Carlos María Aritz Bolea
- Church: Catholic Church
- Diocese: Diocese of Colón-Kuna Yala
- In office: 15 December 1988 – 18 June 2008
- Predecessor: Diocese erected
- Successor: Audilio Aguilar Aguilar
- Previous posts: Titular Bishop of Nigrae Maiores (1981-1988); Vicar Apostolic of Darién (1981-1988)

Orders
- Ordination: 28 June 1953
- Consecration: 21 November 1981 by Blasco Francisco Collaço

Personal details
- Born: 6 December 1928 Marcilla, Navarre, Kingdom of Spain
- Died: 29 August 2015 (aged 86)

Carlos María Ariz Bolea (6 December 1928 – 29 August 2015) was a Catholic bishop.

Born in Marcilla, Spain, Ariz Bolea was named bishop of the Vicar Apostolic of Darién, Panama, in 1981. In 1985, he was named bishop of the Catholic Diocese of Colón-Kuna Yala, Panama, retiring in 2005.
