= Francisco de Abrego =

Spanish Roman Catholic prelate

Most Reverend Francisco de Abrego
- Bishop of Panamá
- Church: Catholic Church
- Diocese: Diocese of Panamá
- In office: 1566–1574
- Predecessor: Juan de Vaca
- Successor: Manuel de Mercado Aldrete

Personal details
- Born: Spain
- Died: July 26, 1574

Francisco de Abrego (died July 26, 1574) was a Roman Catholic prelate who served as Bishop of Panamá (1566–1574).

== Biography ==
Francisco de Abrego was born in Spain and ordained a priest in the Order of Santiago. On February 15, 1566, Pope Pius V, appointed him Bishop of Panamá. He served as Bishop of Panamá until his death on July 26, 1574.

== See also ==
- Catholic Church in Panama

== External links and additional sources ==
- Cheney, David M. "Archdiocese of Panamá". Catholic-Hierarchy.org. (for Chronology of Bishops) ^{[self-published]}
- Chow, Gabriel. "Metropolitan Archdiocese of Panamá". GCatholic.org. (for Chronology of Bishops) ^{[self-published]}

Religious titles
Preceded by Juan de Vaca	Bishop of Panamá; 1566–1574	Succeeded by Manuel de Mercado Aldrete
