= Usilla =

Usilla or Usula was a town in the Roman province of Byzacena, now Inchilla in Tunisia.

Ptolemy mentions the town, which appears also in the Tabula Peutingeriana and other geographical documents. These indicate that it was situated 51 km (32 mi) from Thysdrus (El Djem) and 45 km (28 mi) from Thaenae (Sfax). The ruins of the town include those of a Byzantine basilica.

Usula became a Christian bishopric, that is included in the Catholic Church's list of titular sees.

The names of six of its bishops have been preserved:

- Felix, who was at the Council of Carthage (256);
- Cassianus, at the Council of Carthage (349);
- Theodore, one of the Donatist partisans of Maximianus, who at the Council of Cabarsussi (393) condemned Primianus, and in turn at the Council of Bagai (394) was condemned by the partisans of the latter, as one of the consecrators of Maximianus;
- Privatus, present at the Conference of Carthage (411);
- Victorinus, one of the Catholic bishops whom Huneric summoned to Carthage in 484 and then exiled;
- Laurentius, a signatory of the letter against the Monothelites that the bishops of Byzacene addressed to the Byzantine emperor in 641.
