= Diocese of Penonomé =

Roman Catholic diocese in Panama

Coordinates: 8.5219°N 80.3594°W

Diocese of Penonomé Dioecesis Poenonomensis
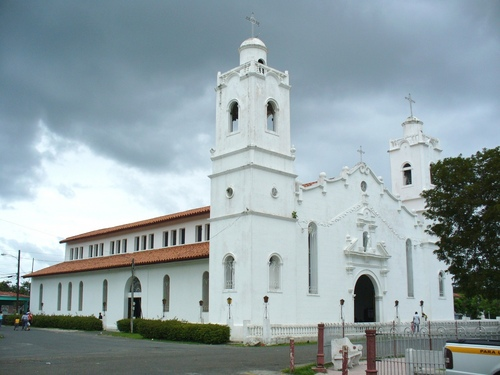
- Catedral San Juan Bautista

Location
- Country: Panama
- Ecclesiastical province: Province of Panamá
- Metropolitan: Jose Domingo Ulloa Mendieta, O.S.A.

Statistics
- Area: 4,927 km^{2} (1,902 sq mi)
- Population: Total; Catholics: (as of 2003); 204,551; 178,600 (87.3%)
- Parishes: 8

Information
- Denomination: Roman Catholic
- Rite: Roman Rite
- Established: 18 December 1993 (32 years ago)
- Cathedral: Cathedral of St. John Baptist

Current leadership
- Pope: Leo XIV
- Bishop: Edgardo Cedeño Muñoz
- Metropolitan Archbishop: José Domingo Ulloa Mendieta, O.S.A.

Map
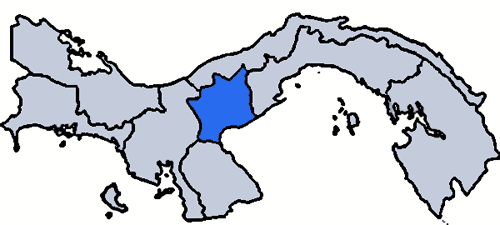

The Roman Catholic Diocese of Penonomé (erected 18 December 1993) is a suffragan diocese of the Archdiocese of Panamá.

== Ordinaries ==
- Uriah Adolphus Ashley Maclean (1993 – 2014), appointed Titular Bishop of Agbia
- Edgardo Muñoz Cedeño, S.V.D. (2015 – Present)

== See also ==
- Catholic Church in Panama
