= Diocese of Santiago de Veraguas =

Roman Catholic diocese in Panama

Coordinates: 8.0972°N 80.9834°W

Diocese of Santiago de Veraguas Dioecesis Sancti Iacobi Veraguensis
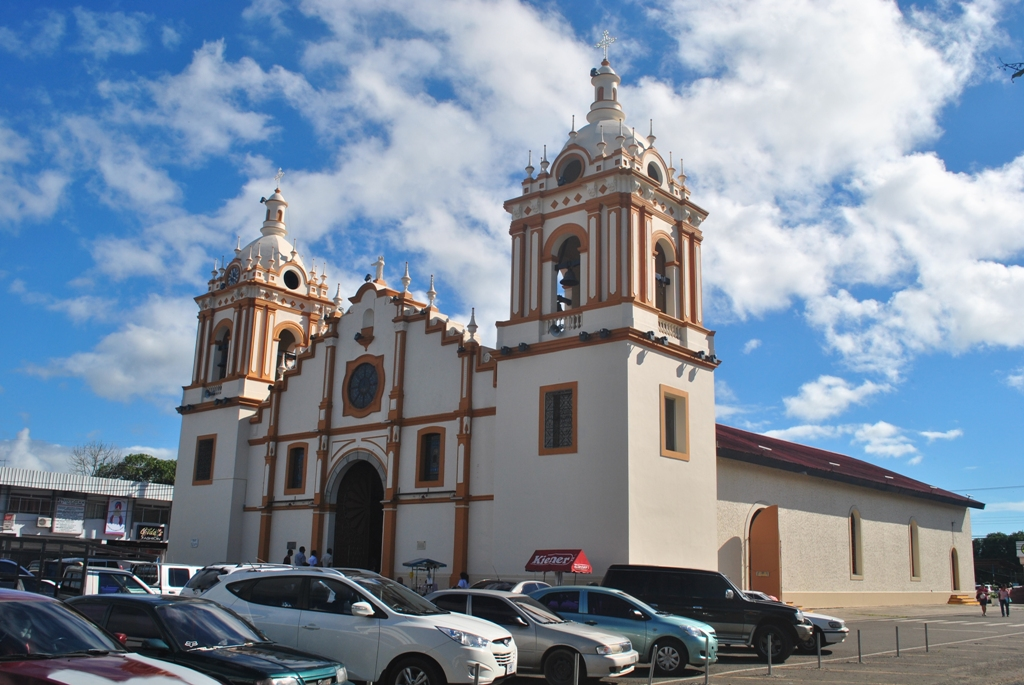
- Catedral Santiago Apóstol

Location
- Country: Panama
- Ecclesiastical province: Province of Panamá
- Metropolitan: Jose Domingo Ulloa Mendieta, O.S.A.

Statistics
- Area: 11,239 km^{2} (4,339 sq mi)
- Population: Total; Catholics: (as of 2004); 214,525; 181,900 (84.8%)
- Parishes: 14

Information
- Denomination: Roman Catholic
- Rite: Roman Rite
- Established: 13 July 1963 (62 years ago)
- Cathedral: Cathedral of St. James the Apostle

Current leadership
- Pope: Leo XIV
- Bishop: Oscar Mario Brown Jiménez

Map
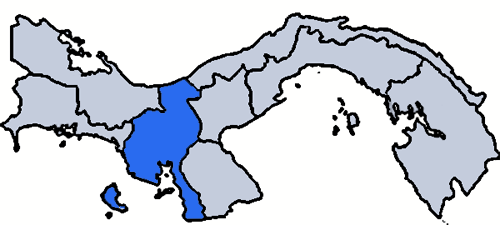

The Roman Catholic Diocese of Santiago de Veraguas (erected 13 July 1963) is a suffragan diocese of the Archdiocese of Panamá. Appointed in April 2013, the current bishop is Audilio Aguilar Aguilar.

== Current bishop ==
=== Appointment ===
On Tuesday, April 30, 2013, Pope Francis accepted the resignation from the pastoral care of the Roman Catholic Diocese of Santiago de Veraguas submitted by the fourth bishop of the diocese, Bishop Oscar Brown Mario Jiménez, in accordance with Canon 401.1 of the Western-rite 1983 Code of Canon Law. Pope Francis appointed Bishop Audilio Aguilar Aguilar, who until then had been serving as bishop of the Roman Catholic Diocese of Colón-Kuna Yala, Panama, to serve as the fifth bishop of the Roman Catholic Diocese of Santiago de Veraguas.

=== Biography ===
Bishop Audilio Aguilar Aguilar was born on August 4, 1963, in Cañazas, Panama, located in the Roman Catholic Diocese of Santiago de Veraguas. He completed his philosophical and theological studies in the major seminaries of the Roman Catholic Archdiocese of Guayaquil in Ecuador and the Roman Catholic Archdiocese of San José in Costa Rica. He earned a Licentiate of Canon Law at the Pontifical Lateran University in Rome, Italy. He was ordained a priest on August 4, 1990, and incardinated in the Roman Catholic Diocese of Santiago de Veraguas.

During his priestly ministry, he was spiritual director of the Diocesan Minor Seminary San Liborio, pastor of the Parish of San Francisco Javier in Cañazas, trainer and professor at the Major Seminary San Jose, Panama, assistant secretary of the Episcopal Conference of Panama, judge of the Ecclesiastical Court of Panama, pastor of the Parish of San Isidro Labrador in Sona, Panama, and parish priest of the Parish of San Miguel Arcangel (Saint Michael the Archangel) in Atalaya, Panama. On June 18, 2005, he was appointed bishop of the Roman Catholic Diocese of Colón - Kuna Yala by Pope Emeritus Benedict XVI, and on August 6, 2005, he was ordained a bishop. Since 2010, he has been serving as the vice president of the Episcopal Conference of Panama.

== Ordinaries ==
- Marcos Gregorio McGrath, C.S.C. (1964–1969), appointed Archbishop of Panamá
- Martin Legarra Tellechea, O.A.R. (1969–1975)
- José Dimas Cedeño Delgado (1975–1994), appointed Archbishop of Panamá
- Oscar Brown Mario Jiménez (1994–2013)
- Audilio Aguilar Aguilar (2013–present); previously, Bishop of the Roman Catholic Diocese of Colón-Kuna Yala, Panama
