= Nicolás de Ramos y Santos =

Spanish Roman Catholic prelate

Most Reverend Nicolás de Ramos y Santos
- Archbishop of Santo Domingo
- Church: Catholic Church
- Diocese: Archdiocese of Santo Domingo
- In office: 1592–1599
- Predecessor: Alfonso López de Avila
- Successor: Agustín Dávila Padilla
- Previous post: Bishop of Puerto Rico (1588–1592)

Personal details
- Born: 1531 Villasabariego, Spain
- Died: December 1, 1599 (aged 67–68) Santo Domingo

Nicolás de Ramos y Santos (1531 – December 1, 1599) was a Roman Catholic prelate who served as the Archbishop of Santo Domingo (1592–1599) and the third Bishop of Puerto Rico (1588–1592).

== Biography ==
Nicolás de Ramos y Santos was born in Villasabariego, Spain and ordained a priest in the Order of Friars Minor. On February 12, 1588, he was appointed by the King of Spain and confirmed by Pope Sixtus V as Bishop of Puerto Rico. On July 13, 1592, he was appointed by the King of Spain and confirmed by Pope Clement VIII as Archbishop of Santo Domingo where served until his death on December 1, 1599.

== External links and additional sources ==
- Cheney, David M. "Archdiocese of San Juan de Puerto Rico". Catholic-Hierarchy.org. (for Chronology of Bishops) ^{[self-published]}
- Chow, Gabriel. "Metropolitan Archdiocese of San Juan de Puerto Rico". GCatholic.org. (for Chronology of Bishops) ^{[self-published]}
- Cheney, David M. "Archdiocese of Santo Domingo". Catholic-Hierarchy.org. (for Chronology of Bishops) ^{[self-published]}
- Chow, Gabriel. "Metropolitan Archdiocese of Santo Domingo". GCatholic.org. (for Chronology of Bishops) ^{[self-published]}

Religious titles
Preceded by Diego de Salamanca	Bishop of Puerto Rico; 1588–1592	Succeeded by Antonio Calderón de León
Preceded by Alfonso López de Avila	Archbishop of Santo Domingo; 1592–1599	Succeeded by Agustín Dávila Padilla
