= José Dimas Cedeño Delgado =

Panamanian archbishop

His Excellency José Dimas Cedeño Delgado
- Archbishop Emeritus of Panamá
- Church: Roman Catholic Church
- Archdiocese: Panamá
- Installed: 18 April 1994
- Term ended: 18 February 2010
- Predecessor: Marcos Gregorio McGrath, C.S.C.
- Successor: José Domingo Ulloa Mendieta, O.S.A.
- Previous post: Bishop of Santiago de Veraguas (1975-1994)

Orders
- Ordination: 25 June 1961 by Francisco Beckmann, C.M.
- Consecration: 17 May 1975 by Edoardo Rovida

Personal details
- Born: José Dimas Cedeño Delgado; July 23, 1933 (age 93) Peña Blanca, Panama

Styles of José Dimas Cedeño Delgado
- Reference style: His Excellency
- Spoken style: Your Excellency
- Religious style: Archbishop

José Dimas Cedeño Delgado (born 23 July 1933) was the Roman Catholic archbishop of the Archdiocese of Panamá from 1994 to 2010, when his resignation was accepted by Pope Benedict XVI for reasons of age. Benedict appointed one of the Archbishop's Auxiliary Bishops, Bishop Jose Domingo Ulloa Mendieta, O.S.A., to serve as the next Metropolitan Archbishop of Panama.

Cedeño was ordained a priest in 1961 and was consecrated a bishop in 1975 when he became the bishop of the Diocese of Santiago de Veraguas. Cedeño succeeded Marcos Gregorio McGrath as the archbishop of Panama on 18 April 1994.
