= Alfonso López de Avila =

Most Reverend Alfonso López de Avila
- Archbishop of Santafé en Nueva Granada
- Church: Catholic Church
- Archdiocese: Archdiocese of Santafé en Nueva Granada
- In office: 1591–1591
- Predecessor: Luis Zapata de Cárdenas
- Successor: Bartolomé Martinez Menacho y Mesa
- Previous post: Archbishop of Santo Domingo (1580–1591)

Personal details
- Born: Córdoba, Spain
- Died: 30 December 1591 Santo Domingo

Alfonso López de Avila (died 30 December 1591) was a Roman Catholic prelate who served as the Archbishop of Santafé en Nueva Granada (1591) and Archbishop of Santo Domingo (1580–1591).

== Biography ==
Alfonso López de Avila was born in Córdoba, Spain. On 14 March 1580 he was appointed by the King of Spain and confirmed by Pope Gregory XIII as Archbishop of Santo Domingo. On 29 November 1591 he was appointed by the King of Spain and confirmed by Pope Innocent IX as Archbishop of Santafé en Nueva Granada where served until his death on 30 December 1591 in Santo Domingo.

== External links and additional sources ==
- Cheney, David M. "Archdiocese of Santo Domingo". Catholic-Hierarchy.org. (for Chronology of Bishops) ^{[self-published]}
- Chow, Gabriel. "Metropolitan Archdiocese of Santo Domingo". GCatholic.org. (for Chronology of Bishops) ^{[self-published]}
- Cheney, David M. "Archdiocese of Bogotá". Catholic-Hierarchy.org. (for Chronology of Bishops) ^{[self-published]}
- Chow, Gabriel. "Metropolitan Archdiocese of Bogotá (Colombia)". GCatholic.org. (for Chronology of Bishops) ^{[self-published]}

Religious titles
| Preceded by Francisco Andrés de Carvajal | Archbishop of Santo Domingo; 1580–1591 | Succeeded by Nicolás de Ramos y Santos |
| Preceded by Luis Zapata de Cárdenas | Bishop of Santafé en Nueva Granada; 1591 | Succeeded by Bartolomé Martinez Menacho y Mesa |
