= Diocese of David =

Diocese of the Catholic Church in Panama

Coordinates: 8.4246°N 82.4218°W

Diocese of David Dioecesis Davidensis

Location
- Country: Panama
- Ecclesiastical province: Province of Panamá
- Metropolitan: Jose Domingo Ulloa Mendieta, O.S.A.

Statistics
- Area: 8,167 km^{2} (3,153 sq mi)
- Population: Total; Catholics: (as of 2006); 396,000; 351,000 (88.6%)
- Parishes: 34

Information
- Denomination: Roman Catholic
- Rite: Roman Rite
- Established: 6 March 1955 (70 years ago)
- Cathedral: Cathedral of St. Joseph

Current leadership
- Pope: Leo XIV
- Bishop: Luis Enrique Saldaña Guerra
- Bishops emeritus: José Luis Lacunza Maestrojuán

Map
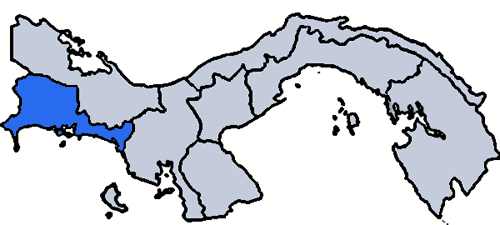

The Roman Catholic Diocese of David (erected 6 March 1955) is a suffragan diocese of the Archdiocese of Panamá. The diocese was founded in March 1955. The cathedral church is the Catedral de San José, Chiriquí. The current bishop is Bishop-elect Luis Enrique Saldaña Guerra.

== Gallery ==
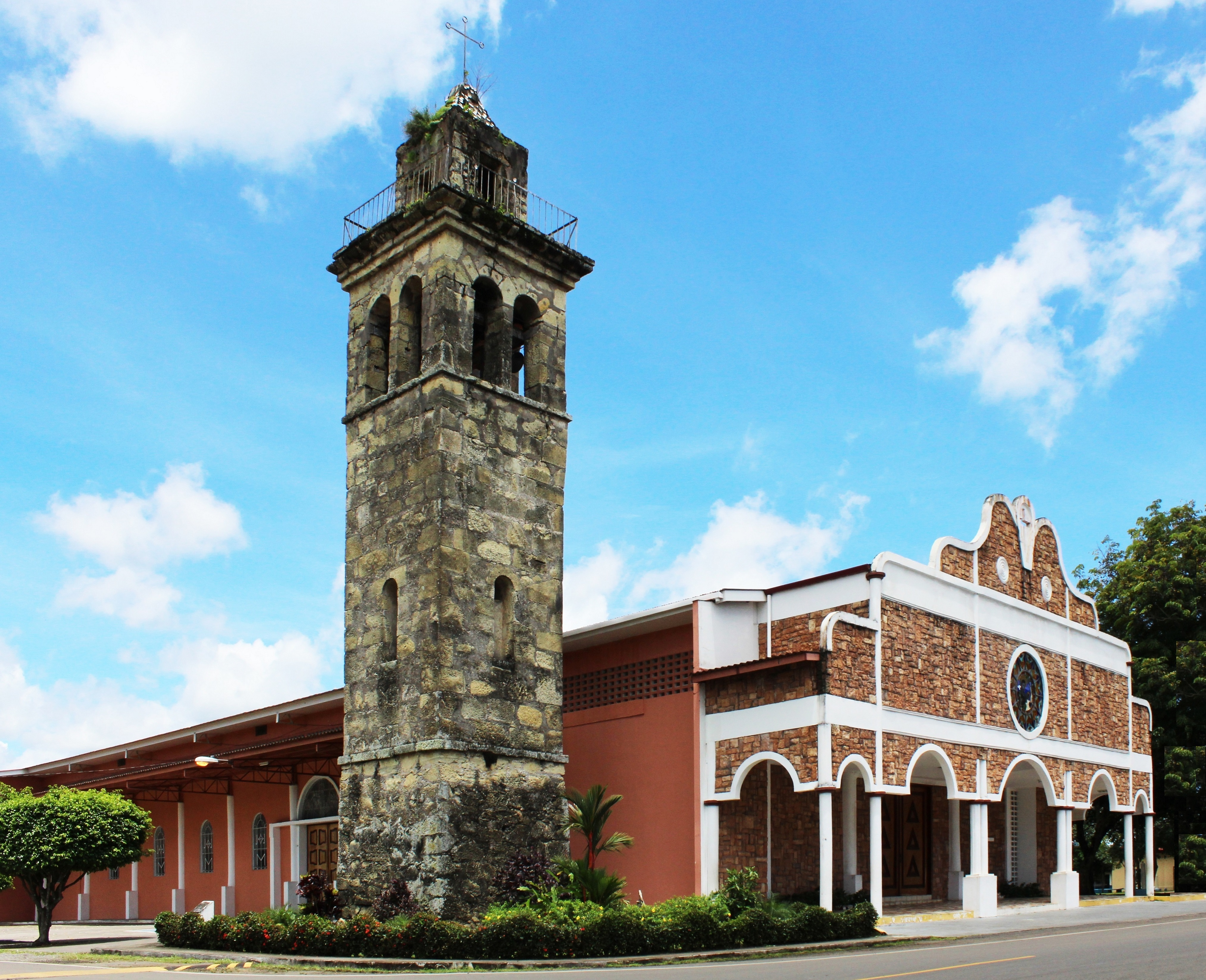
Catedral David Chiriqui

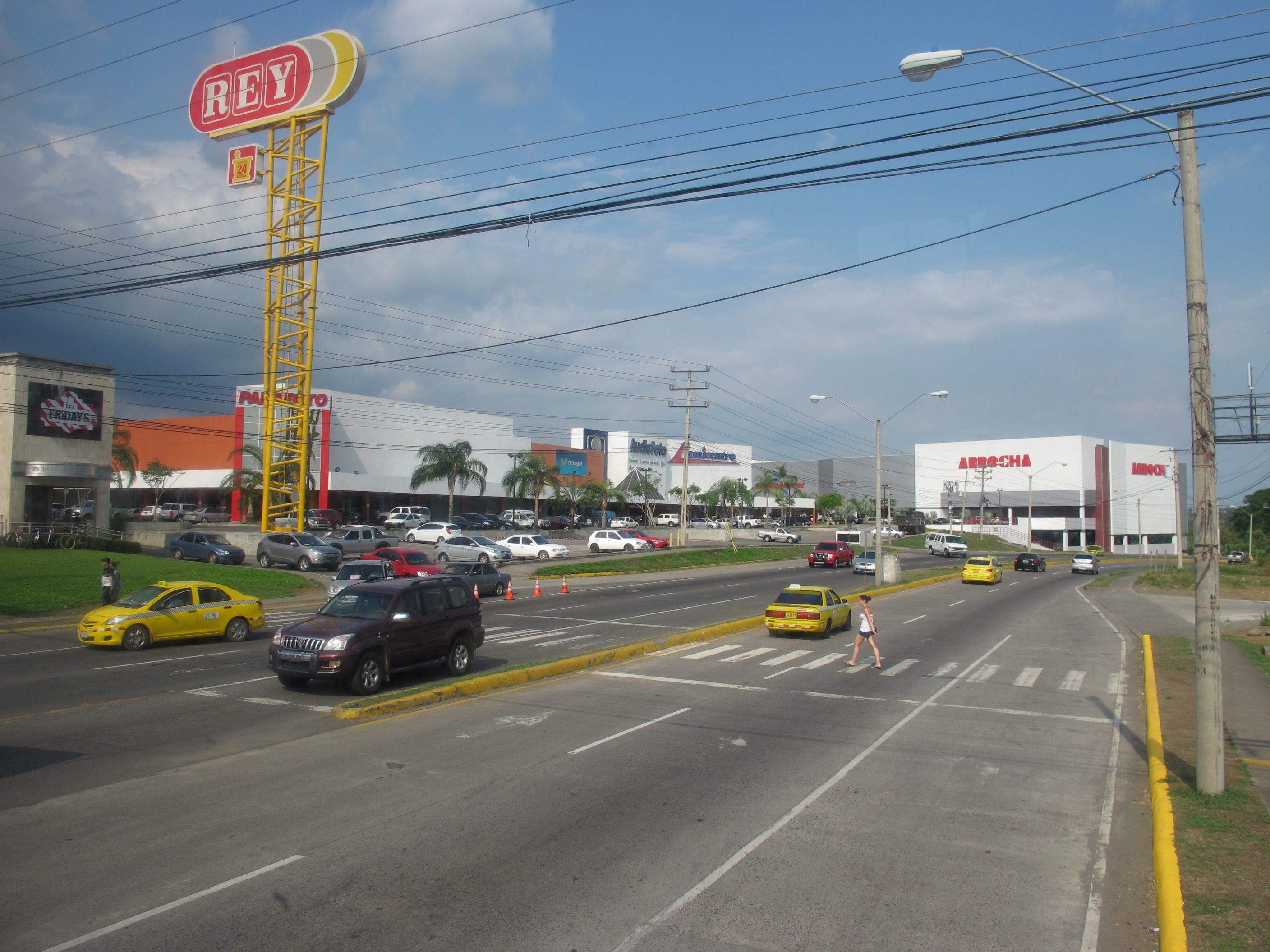
David (Panama) - Route Panaméricaine

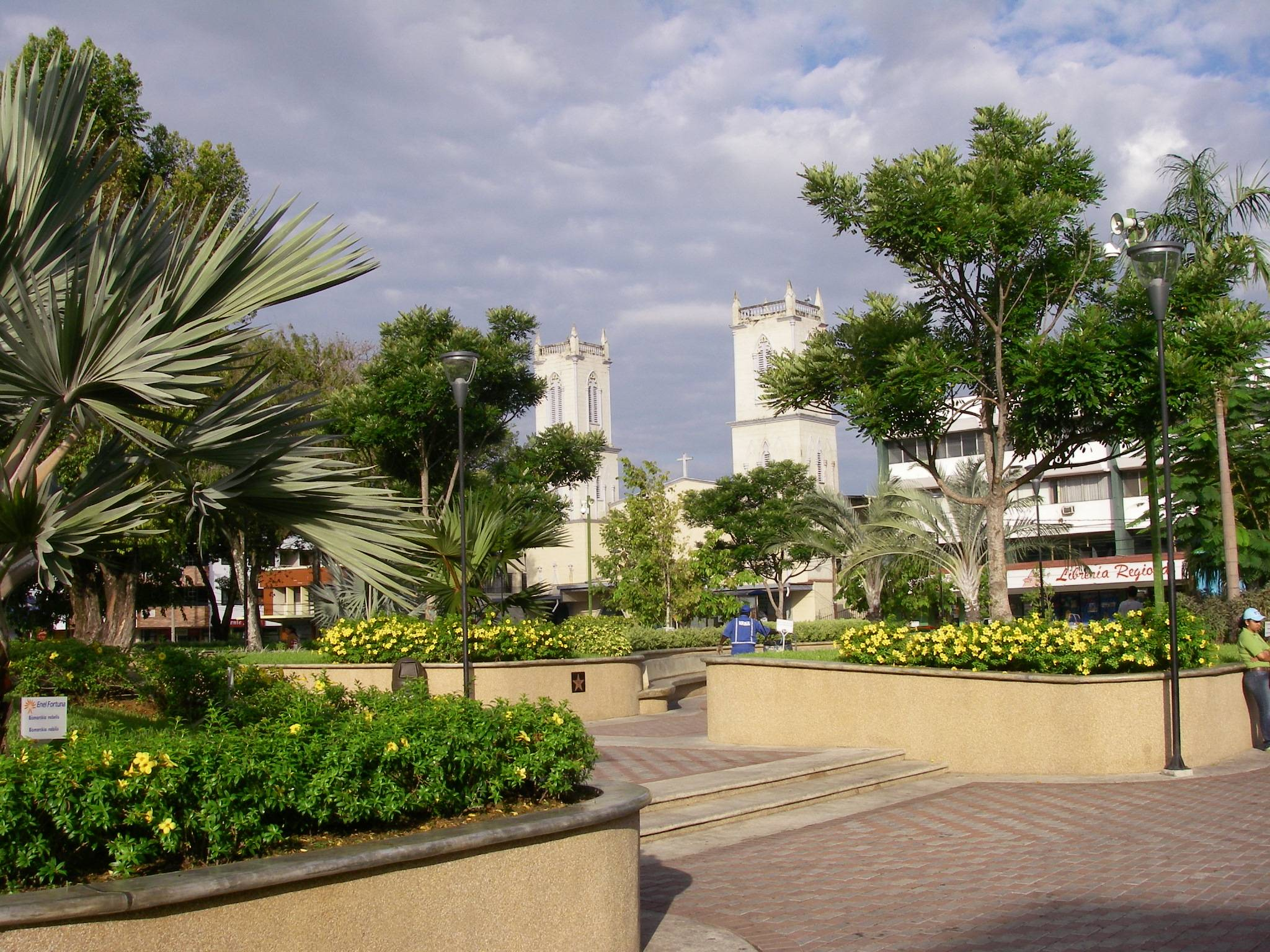
David, Panama

== Bishops ==
=== Ordinaries ===
- Tomas Alberto Clavel Méndez (1955–1964), appointed Archbishop of Panamá
- Daniel Enrique Núñez Núñez (1964–1999)
- José Luis Lacunza Maestrojuán, O.A.R. (1999–2024), elevated to Cardinal in 2015 and retired in 2024
- Luis Enrique Saldaña Guerra, O.F.M. (2024–)

=== Coadjutor bishop ===
- Carlos Ambrosio Lewis Tullock, S.V.D. (1986-1994), did not succeed to see

== Territorial losses ==
Year	Along with	To form
1962		Territorial Prelature of Bocas del Toro

== See also ==
- Catholic Church in Panama
