= Floyd Britton =

Panamanian political leader (1937–1969)

Floyd Britton (21 April 1937 in Colon – 29 November 1969 in Coiba Island) was a Panamanian leftist revolutionary and political leader.

== History ==
He came from an immigrant black family that had come to Panama for better employment opportunities. A student leader from his days in secondary school, which he graduated in 1958, he participated in a failed guerrilla revolt the following year and then enrolled in the University of Panama.

He quickly became a leader of the militant Revolutionary Action Movement (RAM) and of the Federation of Students of Panama (FEP), organized anti-imperialist protests against U.S. colonialism, attended conferences in Cuba, and joined the People's Party of Panama, Panama's first and main Marxist party. Perhaps most significantly, Britton was one of the leaders of the protests in 1964 that are today commemorated in the Day of the Martyrs holiday.

With politics heavily influenced both by Castro's revolution and Maoism, he broke with the People's Party, forming one of two leftist sects. On 11 October 1968, a military coup place General Omar Torrijos in power, and within hours, Britton was abducted by the National Guard and sent to the Coiba penal colony.

== Death ==
On 29 November 1969, Britton was beaten to death on Coiba, according to numerous witnesses. Panama's governments have long refused to disclose any details, and Britton's remains have never been found, although a search continues.

=== Afterwards ===
At the commencement of the coup, Britton's political group merged with others to form the November 29 National Liberation Movement (MLN-29) which briefly engaged in armed struggle against the military regime. MLN-29 is still a major leader of Panama's left, led by Britton's brother Federico Britton.

Hundreds of political adversaries and civilians suffered the same fate as Britton during the regime's period in power, with the number being unknown.
