= Diocese of Colón-Kuna Yala =

Diocese of the Catholic Church in Panama

Coordinates: 9.3611°N 79.9040°W

Diocese of Colón-Kuna Yala Dioecesis Columbensis-Kunayalensis
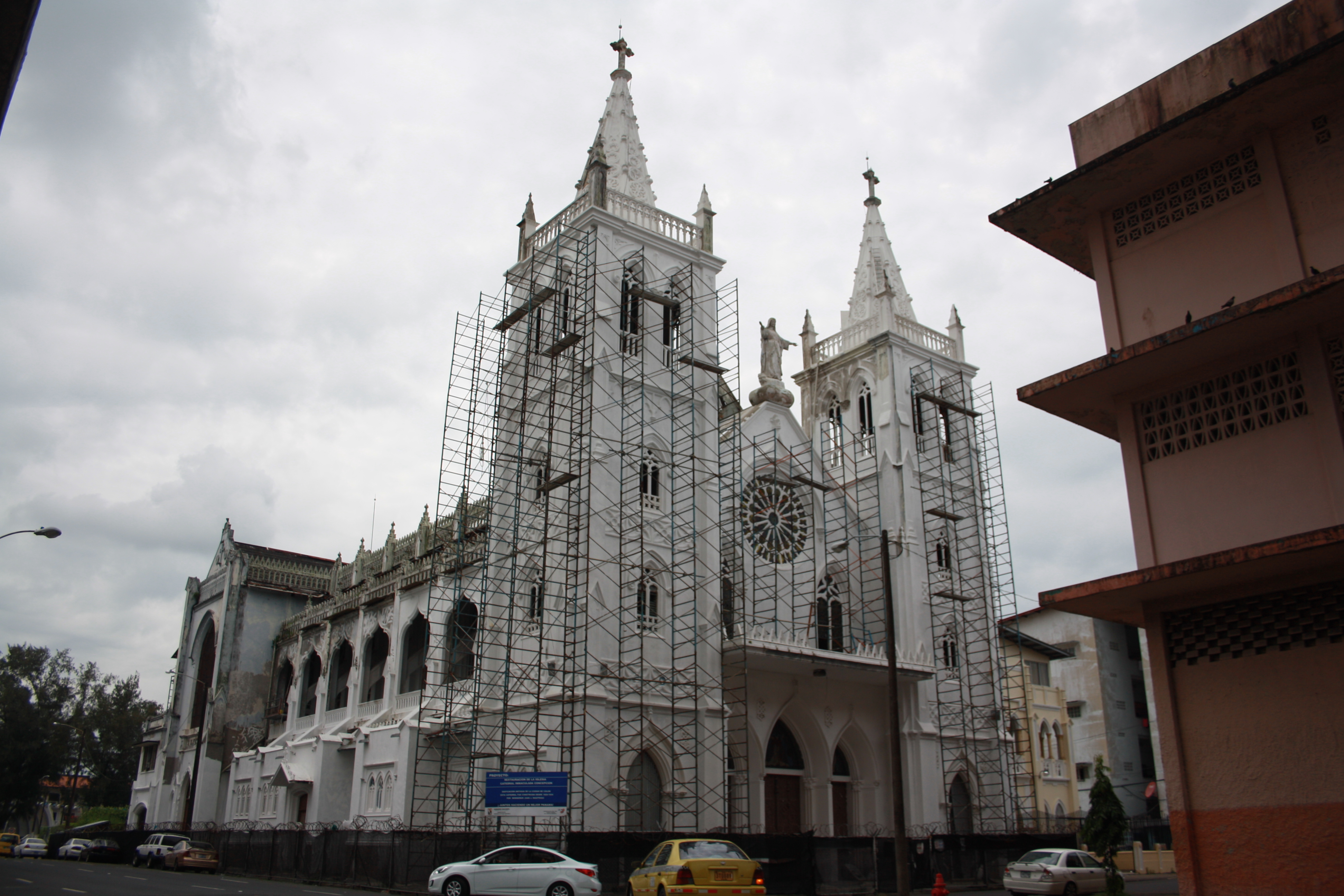
- Catedral de la Inmaculada Concepción de María

Location
- Country: Panama
- Ecclesiastical province: Province of Panamá
- Metropolitan: Jose Domingo Ulloa Mendieta, O.S.A.

Statistics
- Area: 8,167 km^{2} (3,153 sq mi)
- Population: Total; Catholics: (as of 2006); 237,019; 171,000 (72.1%)
- Parishes: 20

Information
- Denomination: Roman Catholic
- Sui iuris church: Latin Church
- Rite: Roman Rite
- Established: 15 December 1988 (36 years ago)
- Cathedral: Cathedral of the Immaculate Conception of Mary

Current leadership
- Pope: Leo XIV
- Bishop: Manuel Ochogavía Barahona O.S.A
- Bishops emeritus: Carlos María Ariz Bolea, C.M.F.

Map
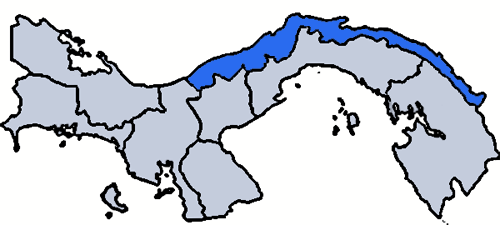

The Roman Catholic Diocese of Colón-Kuna Yala (erected 15 December 1988 as the Diocese of Colón, renamed 13 June 1997) is a suffragan diocese of the Archdiocese of Panamá.

== Ordinaries ==
- Carlos María Ariz Bolea, C.M.F. (1988–2005)
- Audilio Aguilar Aguilar (2005–2013), appointed Bishop of Santiago de Veraguas
- Manuel Ochogavía Barahona, O.S.A. (2014–present)

== See also ==
- Catholic Church in Panama
