= Archdiocese of Panamá =

Roman Catholic archdiocese in Panama

Coordinates: 8.9526°N 79.5352°W

Metropolitan Archdiocese of Panamá Archidioecesis Metropolitanae Panamensis
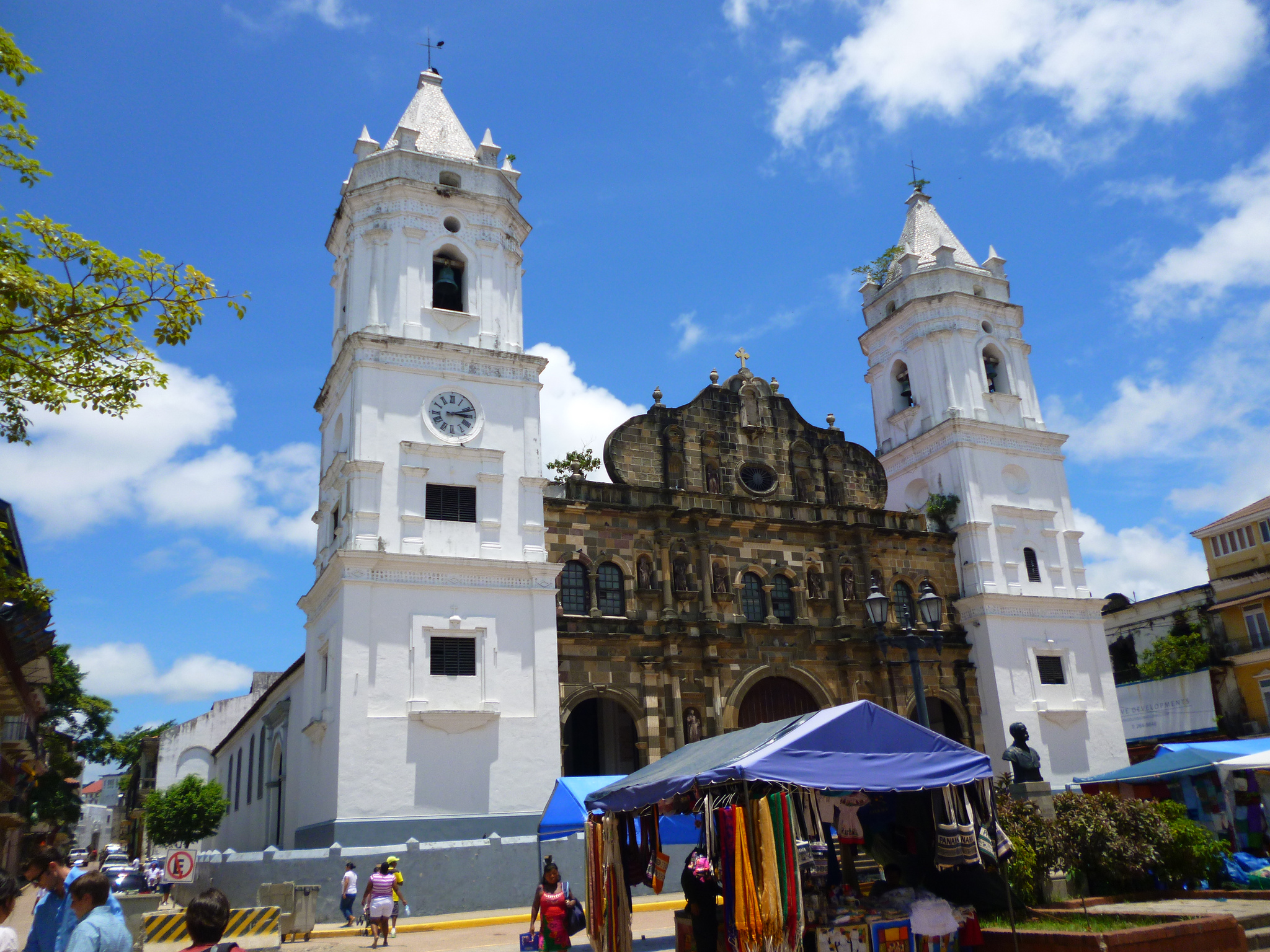
- Catedral Metropolitan de Santa María la Antigua

Location
- Country: Panama
- Ecclesiastical province: Province of Panamá

Statistics
- Area: 13,275 km^{2} (5,126 sq mi)
- Population: Total; Catholics: (as of 2004); 704,117; 633,705 (90%)
- Parishes: 88

Information
- Denomination: Roman Catholic
- Rite: Roman Rite
- Established: 28 August 1513 (512 years ago)
- Cathedral: Metropolitan Cathedral of the Immaculate Conception

Current leadership
- Pope: Leo XIV
- Metropolitan Archbishop: Jose Domingo Ulloa Mendieta
- Bishops emeritus: José Dimas Cedeño Delgado

Map
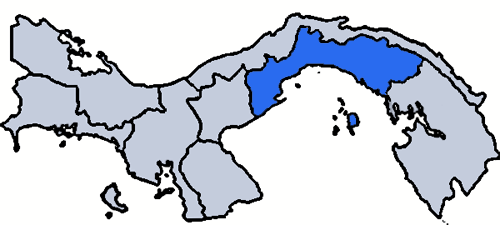

The Roman Catholic Metropolitan Archdiocese of Panamá (erected 28 August 1513 as the Diocese of Santa María de La Antigua del Darién) is a Metropolitan Archdiocese, and its suffragan dioceses include Chitré, Colón-Kuna Yala, David, Penonomé and Santiago de Veraguas, as well as the Territorial Prelature of Bocas del Toro. The Diocese of Santa María de La Antigua del Darién was originally located upriver from the mouth of the Atrato River on the Gulf of Urabá in the Castilla de Oro province. The see was moved to Panama City and renamed as the Diocese of Panamá on 7 December 1520 and elevated to an archdiocese on 29 November 1925. The current Metropolitan Archbishop of Panama is Archbishop Jose Domingo Ulloa Mendieta, O.S.A.

== Bishops ==
=== Ordinaries ===
Diocese of Santa María de La Antigua del Darién

Erected August 28, 1513

- Juan de Quevedo Villegas, O.F.M. (1513–1519)

Diocese of Panamá

Name changed December 7, 1520
- Vicente de Peraza, O.P. (1520–1526)
- Martin de Bejar, O.F.M. (1527–1530)
- Vicente de Valverde, O.P. (1533–)
- Tomás de Berlanga, O.P. (1534–1537)
- Pablo de Torres, O.P. (1546–1560)
- Juan de Vaca, O.S.B. (1561–1565)
- Francisco de Abrego O.S. (1566–1574)
- Manuel de Mercado Aldrete, O.S.H. (1576–1580)
- Bartolomé de Ledesma, O.P. (1580–1583), Appointed Bishop of Antequera, Oaxaca
- Bartolomé Martinez Menacho y Mesa (1587–1593), Appointed Archbishop of Santafé en Nueva Granada
- Pedro Duque de Rivera, S.J. (1594–1594)
- Antonio Calderón de León (1598–1605), Appointed Bishop of Santa Cruz de la Sierra
- Agustín de Carvajal, O.S.A. (1605–1612), Appointed Bishop of Ayacucho o Huamanga
- Francisco de la Cámara y Raya, O.P. (1612–1624)
- Cristóbal Martínez de Salas, O. Praem. (1625–1640)
- Hernando de Ramírez y Sánchez, O.SS.T. (1640–1652)
- Bernardo de Izaguirre de los Reyes (1654–1660), Appointed Bishop of Cuzco

- Bishop-elect Diego López de Vergara y Aguilar (1662–)

- Sancho Pardo Cárdenas y Figueroa (1667–1671)
- Antonio de León y Becerra (1671–1676), Appointed Bishop of Trujillo
- Lucas Fernández de Piedrahita (1677–1688)
- Diego Ladrón de Guevara (1689–1699)
- Juan de Argüelles O.S.A. (1699–1711), Appointed Bishop of Arequipa
- Juan José Llamas Rivas, O.C. (1714–1719)
- Bernardo de Serrada y Villate, O.C. (1720–1725)
- Agustín Rodríguez Delgado (1725–1731)
- Pedro Morcillo Rubio de Suñón (1731–1741)
- Diego de Salinas y Cabrera, O.S.A. (1741–1741)
- Juan de Castaneda Velásquez y Salazar (1742–1749)
- Felipe Manrique de Lara y Polanco (1749–1750)
- Juan B. Tabarga y Durana (1750–1750)
- Valentín Moran Menéndez, O. de M. (1750–1751)
- Francisco Javier de Luna Victoria y Castro (1751–1758)
- Juan Manuel Jerónimo de Romaní y Carrillo (1758–1763)
- Miguel Moreno y Ollo (1763–1770)
- Francisco de los Ríos y Armengol, O.P. (1770–1776)
- José Antonio Umeres de Miranda (1777–1791)
- Remigio de La Santa y Ortega (1792–1797)
- Manuel Joaquín González de Acuña y Saenz (1797–1813)
- Simón López García, C.O. (1814–1815)
- José Higinio Durán y Martel, O. de M. (1816–1823)
- Juan José Cabarcas González y Argüello (1835–1847)
- Juan Francisco del Rosario Manfredo y Ballestas (1847–1850)
- Eduardo Vásquez, O.P. (1856–1869)
- Ignacio Antonio Parra (1870–1875)
- José Telésforo Paúl, S.J. (1875–1884)
- Jose Alejandro Peralta (1886–1899)
- Francisco Javier Junguito, S.J. (1901–1911)
- Guillermo Rojas y Arrieta, C.M. (1912–1933)

Archdiocese of Panamá

Elevated: 29 November 1925

- Juan José Maíztegui y Besoitaiturria, C.M.F. (1933–1943)
- Francisco Beckmann, C.M.F. (1945–1963)
- Tomas Alberto Clavel Méndez (1964–1968)
- Marcos Gregorio McGrath, C.S.C. (1969–1994)
- José Dimas Cedeño Delgado (1994–2010); Archbishop Emeritus
- Jose Domingo Ulloa Mendieta, O.S.A. (2010–present)

=== Coadjutor bishop ===
- Juan Francisco del Rosario Manfredo y Ballestas (1845-1847)

=== Auxiliary bishops ===
- Juan José Maíztegui y Besoitaiturria, C.M.F. (1932-1933), appointed Archbishop here
- Francisco Beckmann, C.M. (1940-1945), appointed Archbishop here
- Marcos G. McGrath, C.S.C. (1961-1964), appointed Bishop of Santiago de Veraguas (later returned here as Archbishop0
- Carlos Ambrosio Lewis Tullock, S.V.D. (1965-1986), appointed Coadjutor Bishop of David
- José Luis Lacunza Maestrojuán, O.A.R. (1985-1994), appointed Bishop of Chitré; future Cardinal
- Oscar Mario Brown Jiménez (1985-1994), appointed Bishop of Santiago de Veraguas
- Fernando Torres Durán (1996-1999), appointed Bishop of Chitré
- José Domingo Ulloa Mendieta, O.S.A. (2004-2010), appointed Archbishop here
- Pablo Varela Server (2004-2019)
- Uriah Adolphus Ashley Maclean (2015-2019)

=== Other priests of this diocese who became bishops ===
- José María Carrizo Villarreal, appointed Bishop of Chitré in 1963
- Rafael Valdivieso Miranda, appointed Bishop of Chitré in 2013

== Current Bishops ==
- Archbishop : Jose Domingo Ulloa Mendieta, O.S.A.

== Territorial losses ==
Year	Along with	To form
1534		Diocese of Cartagena
1534		Diocese of León en Nicaragua
1546		Diocese of Popayán
1925		Vicariate Apostolic of Darién
1955		Diocese of David
1962		Diocese of Chitré
1963		Diocese of Santiago de Veraguas
1993		Diocese of Penonomé

== See also ==
- Catholic Church in Panama
