= José Domingo Ulloa Mendieta =

His Excellency José Domingo Ulloa Mendieta, O.S.A.
- Metropolitan Archbishop of Panamá
- Church: Roman Catholic Church
- Archdiocese: Panamá
- Installed: 18 April 2010
- Predecessor: José Dimas Cedeño Delgado
- Previous posts: Auxiliary Bishop of Panamá (2004-2010); Titular Bishop of Naratcata (2004-2010)

Orders
- Ordination: 17 December 1983 by José María Carrizo Villarreal
- Consecration: 17 April 2004 by José Dimas Cedeño Delgado

Personal details
- Born: José Domingo Ulloa Mendieta; December 24, 1956 (age 69) Chitré, Panama

Styles of José Domingo Ulloa Mendieta, O.S.A.
- Reference style: His Excellency
- Spoken style: Your Excellency
- Religious style: Archbishop

José Domingo Ulloa Mendieta, OSA, is the Roman Catholic Metropolitan Archbishop of Panama.

He was born in Chitré, Panama, December 24, 1956, was ordained priest on December 17, 1983 in Chitre and was consecrated a bishop on April 17, 2004, taking canonical possession of the Metropolitan Archdiocese of Panama on April 18, 2010.

José Domingo Ulloa Mendieta was born in Chitre, Herrera Province, Republic of Panama, on December 24, 1956, the third of three children of the marriage of Dagobert and Clodomira Ulloa Mendieta. He was ordained priest on December 17, 1983 by the then Bishop of Chitre, Bishop José María Carrizo Villarreal, at the Cathedral of San Juan Bautista Chitre. He joined the Augustinian Order in 1987, making his solemn vows on August 28, 1991. He completed his ecclesiastical studies of philosophy from University of Santa Maria de la Antigua and theology in Major Seminary of Saint Joseph in Panama. He obtained licentiate degree in Spiritual Theology from the Universidad Pontificia de Comillas (Madrid), in 1990, licentiate degree in Theology of Religious Life from the Pontifical University of Salamanca, Spain in 2000, and licentiate degree in Canon Law from the Universidad Pontificia de Comillas, Spain, 2002. On February 26, 2004, S.S. Pope John Paul II appointed him Auxiliary Bishop of Panama and Titular Bishop of Naratcata. His episcopal consecration took place in the Metropolitan Cathedral, on April 17, 2004, with Monsignor José Dimas Cedeño Delgado, Metropolitan Archbishop of Panama, presiding.

On February 18, 2010 Pope Benedict XVI named him as the new Metropolitan Archbishop of Panama.

According to an online Catholic News Agency article dated Monday, September 26, 2011:

He recently denounced a proposal to legalize the death penalty in the country. "We cannot counteract violence with violence. There are other means," the archbishop said according to the AFP news agency.

Representative Marco Gonzalez of the ruling party in Panama previously announced a proposal to legalize the death penalty in the country. He claimed it would end widespread violence in the region.

Gonzalez said he plans to move forward with his proposal in the coming weeks and is calling for lawmakers to debate the measure.

His announcement came after the discovery of five Panamanians of Chinese origin who were found buried together in a mass grave. Police suspect they were murdered by a man from the Dominican Republic.

Archbishop Ulloa instead called for tougher and stricter prison sentences and he called on the government to "clarify its security policy."
