= José =

- Gender: predominantly masculine

Other gender
- Feminine: Josefa, Josefina

Origin
- Origin: Latin: Iosephus, Greek: Ιωσήφ, Hebrew: יוֹסֵף

Other names
- Related names: Joseph, Xosé, Josefo, Josetxu or Josetxo (given name in Basque). Feminine forms: Josefa, Josefina, Josée.

José is a predominantly Spanish and Portuguese form of the given name Joseph. While spelled alike, this name is pronounced very differently in each of the two languages: Spanish [xoˈse]; Portuguese [ʒuˈzɛ] (or [ʒoˈzɛ]).

In French, the name José, pronounced [ʒoze], is an old vernacular form of Joseph, which is also in current usage as a given name. José is also commonly used as part of masculine name composites, such as José Manuel, José Maria or Antonio José, and also in female name composites like Maria José or Marie-José. The feminine written form is Josée as in French.

In Netherlandic Dutch, however, José is a feminine given name and is pronounced [joːˈseː]; it may occur as part of name composites like Marie-José or as a feminine first name in its own right; it can also be short for the name Josina and even a Dutch hypocorism of the name Johanna.

In England, Jose is originally a Romano-Celtic surname, and people with this family name can usually be found in, or traced to, the English county of Cornwall, where it was especially frequent during the fourteenth century; this surname is pronounced /ˈdʒoʊz/, as in the English names Joseph or Josephine. According to another interpretation Jose is cognate with Joyce; Joyce is an English and Irish surname derived from the Breton personal name Iodoc, which was introduced to England by the Normans in the form Josse. In medieval England the name was occasionally borne by women but more commonly by men; the variant surname Jose is local to Devon and Cornwall.

The common spelling of this given name in different languages is a case of interlingual homography. Similar cases occur in English given names (Albert, Bertrand, Christine, Daniel, Eric, and Ferdinand) that are not exclusive to the English language and can be found namely in French with a different pronunciation under exactly the same spelling.

== Spanish pronunciation ==
The Spanish pronunciation is [xoˈse]. In Castilian Spanish, the initial ⟨J⟩ is similar to the German ⟨ch⟩ in the name Bach and Scottish Gaelic and Irish ⟨ch⟩ in loch, though Spanish ⟨j⟩ varies by dialect.

Historically, the modern pronunciation of the name José in Spanish is the result of the phonological history of Spanish coronal fricatives since the fifteenth century, when it departed from Old Spanish. Unlike today's pronunciation of this name, in Old Spanish the initial ⟨J⟩ was a voiced postalveolar fricative (as the sound "je" in French), and the middle ⟨s⟩ stood for a voiced apicoalveolar fricative /z̺/ (as in the Castilian pronunciation of the word mismo). The sounds, from a total of seven sibilants once shared by medieval Ibero-Romance languages, were partly preserved in Catalan, Galician, and Occitan, and have survived integrally in Mirandese and in the dialects of northern Portugal.

In those regions of north-western Spain where the Galician and Asturian languages are spoken, the name is spelt Xosé and pronounced [ʃoˈse].

== Portuguese pronunciation ==
The Portuguese given name José is pronounced as [ʒuˈzɛ]. Examples of this are for instance former President of the European Commission José Manuel Barroso and football coach José Mourinho. Historically, the conventional Portuguese spelling of the name was Joseph, just as in English, though variants like Jozeph were not uncommon. Following the 1910 revolution, the Portuguese spelling was modernized. The first reform of Portuguese orthography of 1911 elided the final mute consonants ⟨ph⟩ and ⟨th⟩ from Biblical anthroponyms and toponyms (e.g. Joseph, Nazareth) and replaced them with the diacritic on the final ⟨é⟩, indicating the stress vowel (e.g. José, Nazaré). In Portuguese, the pronunciation of vowels varies depending on the country, regional dialect or social identity of the speaker: in the case of the ⟨o⟩ ranging from /u/ to /o/; and in the case of ⟨é⟩, from /e/ to /ɛ/.

The Portuguese phonology developed originally from thirteenth-century Galician-Portuguese, having a number of speakers worldwide that is currently larger than French, Italian and German. In Portuguese the pronunciation of the graphemes ⟨J⟩ and ⟨s⟩ is in fact phonetically the same as in French, where the name José also exists and the pronunciation is similar, aside from obvious vowel variation and language-specific intonation.

== French vernacular form ==
The French given name José, pronounced [ʒoze], is an old vernacular form of the French name Joseph, and is also popular under the feminine form Josée. The masculine form is current as a given name, or as short for Joseph as is the case of French politician José Bové. The same masculine form is also commonly used as part of feminine name composites, as is the case of French athlete Marie-José Pérec. In turn, the feminine form Josée is only used customarily either as a feminine first name or as part of a feminine name composite, with respective examples in French film director Josée Dayan and Canadian actress Marie-Josée Croze.

== Jewish use ==
A number of prominent Jewish men, including sportsmen, entertainers and historical figures, are known publicly as Joseph or Jose, another form of Yossi (Hebrew: יֹוסִי), and a diminutive of Yosef or Yossef (Hebrew: יוֹסֵף).

== Feminine form ==
Both the Spanish and Portuguese feminine written forms of the name are Josefa, pronounced [xoˈsefa] in Spanish, and [ʒuˈzɛfɐ] in Portuguese. The name José also occurs in feminine name composites (e.g. Maria José, Marie-José).

Josée is a French feminine first name, pronounced [ʒoze], relates to the longer feminine form of Joséphine [ʒozefin], and may also be coupled with other names in feminine name composites.

Similarly, in Flemish, José is a male given name, for which the feminine written form is Josée, with both forms being pronounced [ˈjoːseː], but the spelling stems originally from neighboring French-speaking influence.

In Dutch, however, José is pronounced [ˈjoːseː], which is a feminine given name in its own right, sometimes also used as short for the feminine name Josina. Examples are Olympic swimmer José Damen and pop singer José Hoebee.

Josephine and Joséphine are in use in English-speaking countries, while Josefine is popular in Western Europe.

== Diminutives ==
One of the common Spanish diminutives of the name is Pepe, which is a repetition of the last syllable of the earlier form Josep. (Popular belief attributes the origin of Pepe to the abbreviation of pater putativus, P.P., recalling the role of Saint Joseph in predominantly Catholic Spanish-speaking countries.) In Hispanic America, the diminutives Cheché and Chepe also occur, as in Colombian soccer player José Eugenio ("Cheché") Hernández and Mexican soccer player José ("Chepe") Naranjo.

In Portuguese, the most widely used diminutive form of the name is Zé, and less used forms include Zeca, Zezé, Zezinho, Zuca, and Juca. The augmentative of the diminutive may occur as in Zezão, as well as the diminutive of the diminutive Zequinha, Zezinho, Josesito.

== People ==
=== Mononyms ===
- Jose( Jose Kurian ), Indian actor in Malayalam films
- José of Braganza (Portuguese: Bragança), Portuguese noble of the House of Braganza, Archbishop of Braga, illegitimate son of King Peter II and Francisca Clara da Silva
- Jose the Galilean (Hebrew: יוסי הגלילי, (Yose HaGelili)), 1st–2nd century Jewish rabbi, member of the Tannaim involved in compiling the Mishna
- Prince José, Portuguese noble of the House of Braganza (Portuguese: Bragança), son of Queen Maria I and King Peter III, heir apparent with many titles including Prince of Brazil and Duke of Braganza, died of smallpox at age 27 before ascending to the throne
- Joseph I of Portugal (José Francisco António Inácio Norberto Agostinho), also known as José I of Portugal

=== First names ===
==== A ====
- José Abad Santos, Filipino lawyer and jurist, 5th Chief Justice of the Supreme Court of the Philippines
- José Abal, Spanish Paralympics athlete and medallist
- José Manuel Abascal Gómez, Spanish runner and Olympics medallist
- José Javier Abella Fanjul, Mexican international football player
- Jose ben Abin (Hebrew: יוסי בר אבין), significant 4th century CE Jewish Talmudist
- José Aboulker, French Algerian neurosurgeon, leader of French Algeria's anti-Nazi resistance during World War II, later a French politician
- José Antonio Abreu Anselmi, Venezuelan orchestra conductor, pianist, economist, professor of economics and law at Universidad Simón Bolívar, activist, and politician
- José María de Achá Valiente, Bolivian general, 17th President of Bolivia after leading a coup against dictator José María Linares
- José de Acosta, member of the Society of Jesus (S.J.), Spanish Catholic missionary, theologian and naturalist
- José Adem (1921–1991), Mexican mathematician
- José Manuel Cerqueira Afonso dos Santos, also known to the public as José Afonso, Zeca Afonso and Zeca, influential Portuguese folk and political musician, known especially for the role of his music in the resistance against the dictatorial regime of Oliveira Salazar
- José Álamo Delgado (1903–1940), Spanish footballer
- José Bernardo Alcedo, Peruvian Romantic composer, wrote the National Anthem of Peru
- José Aldo da Silva Oliveira Jnr., Brazilian mixed martial artist
- José Martiniano de Alencar, Brazilian politician, lawyer, orator, novelist and dramatist
- José Alencar Gomes da Silva, Brazilian businessman and politician, 23rd Vice-President of Brazil
- Joseph of Anchieta, Spanish Jesuit missionary to the Portuguese colony of Brazil and Catholic saint
- José Martiniano Pereira de Alencar, Brazilian politician, journalist and onetime Catholic priest, father of José de Alencar
- José de Jesús Alfaro, Nicaraguan politician, Head of State of Nicaragua
- José Maria Alkmin, Brazilian politician, 15th Vice President of Brazil
- José Allende, Peruvian politician, 14th Prime Minister of Peru
- José Alperovich, Argentine politician, governor of Tucumán Province
- Jose Carlos Altuve, Venezuelan-born American baseball player
- José Carlos Araújo, Brazilian journalist
- José Álvarez de las Asturias de Bohórquez y Goyeneche, Spanish noble and equestrian, Marqués de los Trujillos, Olympics competitor
- José Álvarez de Pereira y Cubero, Spanish Neoclassical sculptor
- José Álvarez de Toledo Osorio y Gonzaga, Spanish noble and politician, Duke of Alba, 11th Marquis of Villafranca, Grandee of Spain, 15th Duke of Medina Sidonia, sponsor of Francisco Goya, commissioner of works by Joseph Haydn
- José Ciriaco Alvarez, also known as José Sixto Alvarez, Argentine journalist and Modernist writer, wrote under the pen name "Rob" Fray Mocho
- Jose Lino Alvarez, American professional baseball player
- José Álvarez, United States Virgin Islands-born sports shooter and Olympics competitor
- José Manuel Álvarez. Argentine politician, Governor of Córdoba
- José Ricardo Álvarez, Venezuelan-born American professional baseball player
- Miguel Álvarez Pozo, Cuban basketball player and Olympics competitor
- José René Álvarez Ramírez, known as Joe Alvarez, Cuban-born American baseball player and manager
- José María Álvarez de Sotomayor, Spanish playwright and poet
- José Alves da Costa, Brazilian Catholic bishop, Bishop of Corumbá
- José Augusto Alves Roçadas, military officer and colonial administrator, led troops at the Battle of Mufilo in Portuguese Angola to suppress the Ovambo people's revolt, appointed as governor of the District of Hula in Portuguese Angola, then Governor of Macau, and returned as Governor General of Angola, commanded troops in Southern Angola against the German army's WWI campaign in Angola, later participated in the 28 May 1926 coup d'état which ended the Portuguese First Republic
- José Ramón Andrés Puerta, Spanish-American chef
- José Ruiz Arenas, Bolivian Catholic bishop, Assistant bishop of Bogotá, then Bishop and later Archbishop of Villavicencio, entered the Roman Curia and served in the Pontifical Commission for Latin America, the Pontifical Council for the Promotion of the New Evangelisation and the Congregation for the Evangelization of Peoples
- José María Arguedas Altamirano, Peruvian novelist, poet, and anthropologist
- José Arpa y Perea, Spanish-born painter, worked in Spain, Mexico, and Texas, known for realist landscapes
- José Enrique Arrarás, Puerto Rican lawyer, university lecturer and politician, former member of the Legislative Assembly of Puerto Rico
- José Miguel Arroyo Delgado, known as Joselito, Spanish matador
- José Gervasio Artigas, Uruguayan national hero
- José Luis Astigarraga Lizarralde, Peruvian Catholic bishop, Bishop of the Apostolic Vicariate of Yurimaguas
- José Millán Astray, Spanish general and founder of the Spanish Foreign Legion
- José de Avillez Burnay Ereira, award-winning Portuguese chef and restaurateur
- José María Alfredo Aznar López, Spanish reformist and politician, active member of the Falangist Syndicalist Student Front in his youth, President of the People's Party, served as Prime Minister under King Juan Carlos I

==== B ====
- José Delicado Baeza, Spanish Catholic bishop, Bishop of Tui-Vigo, Archbishop of Valladolid
- José Ballivián, Bolivian general during the Peruvian-Bolivian War and 11th President of Bolivia
- José Manuel Emiliano Balmaceda Fernández, 11th President of Chile
- José Antonio Balseiro, Argentine physicist, specialised in nuclear fusion and nuclear physics
- José Balta y Montero, Peruvian soldier and politician, Prime Minister of Peru, President of Peru
- José Celso Barbosa, Puerto Rican physician, sociologist and politician
- José Juan Barea Mora, known as "J. J.", Puerto Rican-born American professional international basketball player
- José Barrionuevo, Spanish politician
- José de Barros Lima, Brazilian military, responsible for starting the Pernambucan revolution
- José Pablo Torcuato Batlle y Ordóñez, Uruguayan politician, creator of the welfare state, 2nd and 5th President of the Senate and Prime Minister of Uruguay, 19th and 21st President of Uruguay
- José Miguel Battle Sr., Cuban mobster
- José Antonio Bautista Santos, Dominican-born American baseball player
- José Joaquín (Arias) Bautista, Dominican-born American baseball player
- Jose Baxter, UK professional football player
- José Leitão de Barros, Portuguese film director and playwright
- José Manuel Durão Barroso, Portuguese lawyer and professor of law, 115th Prime Minister of Portugal, 11th President of the European Commission
- José Moreira Bastos Neto, Brazilian Catholic bishop, Bishop of Três Lagoas
- José Díaz de Bedoya, Paraguayan politician, member of the Paraguayan Triumvirate
- José Fernando Bello Amigo Serans, Spanish professional football player
- José Alfonso Belloso y Sánchez, Salvadoran Catholic bishop, Auxiliary bishop then Archbishop of San Salvador
- José Luis Benavidez Jr., American professional boxer
- José María Benegas Haddad, nicknamed as Txiki, Venezuelan-born Spanish politician
- José Benlliure y Gil, Spanish painter and sculptor
- José Bergamín Gutiérrez, Spanish writer, essayist, poet, and playwright
- José Miguel Bermúdez Ríos, Spanish professional football player
- José León Bernal, Spanish football player
- José Orlando Berríos, Puerto Rican-born American professional baseball player
- José Avelino Bettencourt, Portuguese-Canadian Catholic bishop, diplomat and chaplain to the Pope, former Head of Protocol of the Secretariat of State of the Holy See, now Apostolic Nuncio to Georgia and Armenia
- José González Blázquez, member of the Order of the Blessed Virgin Mary of Mercy and Spanish Catholic bishop, Bishop of Ciudad Rodrigo, then Bishop of Plascencia
- José María Bocanegra, Mexican lawyer and politician, Interim President of Mexico
- Joseph Bonaparte, French King
- José Borregales (born 1998), American football player
- José Antonio Bottiroli, Argentine composer, pianist and poet
- Joseph (José) Bové, French farmer, politician and syndicalist
- José Antonio Bowen, American jazz musician and president of Goucher College
- José Luis Brown, retired Argentine football player and coach
- José Brocá y Codina (Catalan: Antoni Josep Mateu Brocà i Codina), Spanish guitarist and Romantic composer
- José María Bueno y Monreal, Spanish Catholic bishop and cardinal, first Bishop of Jaca, then Bishop of Vitoria, Coadjutor bishop of Seville and finally Archbishop of Seville, made Cardinal by Pope John XXIII
- Jose Apolonio Burgos y García, Filipino Catholic priest and activist executed by the Spanish authorities
- José Bustamante y Rivero, Peruvian lawyer, jurist, writer, politician, and diplomat, President of Peru, President of the International Court of Justice in The Hague

==== C ====
- José María Cabral y Luna, Dominican general and politician, Supreme Chief of the Dominican Republic, then President, abolished capital punishment and banishment
- José María Calatrava y Peinado, Spanish statesman, served as Prime Minister under Consort Queen Maria Christina, Regent of Spain
- José Manuel Calderón Borrallo, Spanish professional basketball player
- José de Jesus Calderón Frias, Panamanian football player
- José Luis Calderón, Argentine football player
- José Luis Calderón Cabrera, Mexican architect and professor, specialist in restoration of churches and monuments
- José Manuel Calderón, known as El Maestro de Bachata, first Dominican Republic musician to record bachata
- José Campeche y Jordán, recognised Puerto Rican Rococo painter
- José Canalejas y Méndez, Spanish literary scholar and politician, served as Prime Minister under King Alfonso XIII
- José María Cano, Spanish visual artist, pianist, musician, composer, and record producer
- José María Ortega Cano, known as Joselito, Spanish matador
- José Canseco Capas Jr., known as José Canesco, Cuban-American baseball player
- Jose Pablo Cantillo, American stage, television and film actor
- José Raúl Capablanca y Graupera, Cuban chess player and world chess champion, considered to be one of the best players of all time
- José Carabaño, Venezuelan music executive and graphic designer, known as Junior
- José Carbó, Argentine-born Australian baritone
- José María Cárdenas López, Mexican international football player
- José Cardoso Pires, Portuguese author of short stories, novels, plays, and political satire
- José María Caro Rodríguez, Chilean Catholic bishop and cardinal, Apostolic Vicar of Tarapac, Bishop then Archbishop of La Serena, then Archbishop of Santiago de Chile, made a Cardinal by Pope Pius XII in 1946, a strong opponent of Freemasonry he wrote frequently on the subject including The Mystery of Freemasonry Unveiled.
- José Maria Carreño Blanco, Venezuelan politician and military officer, Interim President, Vice President
- José Miguel Carrera Verdugo, Chilean general, considered one of the founders of independent Chile, leader under the junta government, Supreme Director of Chile
- José Carreras, Catalan tenor
- José de Carvajal y Lancáster, Spanish jurist and statesman, served as First Secretary of State under King Ferdinand IV, founded Madrid's Real Academia de Bellas Artes de San Fernando
- José Arturo Castellanos Contreras, former Salvadoran army colonel and diplomat, El Salvador's World War II Consul General to Geneva, recognised as having saved up to 40,000 Jews and Central Europeans from Nazi persecution
- José de Jesús Castillo Rentería, Mexican Catholic bishop, Bishop of Tuxtepec
- José Luis Castillo, Mexican boxer
- Jose Ceballos, American Government Affairs Director for the National Air Traffic Controllers Association (NATCA)
- José Marti Ceda Marte, Dominican-born Americanbaseball player
- José Dimas Cedeño Delgado, Panamanian Catholic bishop, Bishop of Veraguas, then Archbishop of Panamá
- Juan C. Centeno, Puerto Rican-born American baseball player
- José Domingo Cervantes Padilla, Mexican professional football player
- José Francisco Cevallos Enríquez, Ecuadorian professional football player
- José Xavier de Cerveira e Sousa, Portuguese professor at the University of Coimbra and Catholic bishop, Bishop of Funchal, Bishop of Beja, then Bishop of Viseu
- Jose Chameleone, stage name for Ugandan Afrobeat singer Joseph Mayanja
- José Antonio Chang Escobedo, Peruvian politician, 144th Prime Minister of Peru
- José Francisco Chaves, military leader, politician, lawyer and rancher from the New Mexico Territory
- José Ignacio Cienfuegos Arteaga, Chilean friar of the Dominican Order (O.P.), politician, diplomat and Catholic bishop, advocate for the independence of Chile, twice President of the Senate of Chile, twice Ambassador to the Holy See, Bishop of Concepción (now known as the Archdiocese of Concepción)
- Josep Climent i Avinent, also known as José Climent, Spanish Catholic bishop, theology professor at the University of Valencia, Bishop of Barcelona (now known as the Archdiocese of Barcelona
- José Eusebio Colombres. Argentine statesman and Catholic bishop-elect, accredited with the foundation of the sugarcane industry in Tucumán Province, Bishop-Elect of Salta but died before being consecrated
- Juan José Revueltas Colomer, Spanish-American composer
- José Gutiérrez de la Concha, Spanish noble under the titles 1st Marquis of Havana, 1st Viscount of Cuba and Grandee of Spain, military general, politician and statesman, served as Prime Minister under Queen Isabella II
- José Corazón de Jesús also known under the pen name Huseng Batute, Filipino poet
- José Luis Corcuera, former Spaniard politician
- José Corniell, Dominican professional baseball pitcher in the Texas Rangers organization
- José Andrés Corral Arredondo, Mexican Catholic bishop, Bishop of Parral
- José Alves Correia da Silva, Portuguese Catholic bishop, Bishop of Leiria (now known as the Diocese of Leiria-Fátima)
- José Correia da Serra, Portuguese abbé, philosopher, diplomat, politician and naturalist, the plant genus Correa is named in his honour
- José Justo Corro, Mexican lawyer, politician, and 10th President of the Centralist Republic of Mexico
- José Corticchiato, French publisher, the Parisienne bookshop and publishing house José Corti was named after him.
- José Guillermo Cortines, Dominican actor, musician, writer and television host
- José María Justo Cos y Macho, Spanish Catholic bishop and cardinal, also served in Cuba, Bishop of Mondoñedo (now known as the Diocese of Mondoñedo-Ferrol), Archbishop of Santiago de Cuba, Bishop of Madrid-Alcala (now known as the Archdiocese of Madrid) with the personal title of "Archbishop", Archbishop of Valladolid, made Cardinal by Pope Pius X in 1911
- José da Costa Campos, Portuguese-Goan military officer and colonial administrator, field marshal of the Portuguese army in Portuguese India
- José Miguel Cotto, Puerto Rican boxer
- José Bezerra Coutinho, Brazilian Catholic bishop, Auxiliary bishop of Sobral, then Bishop of Estância
- Francisco José Cox Huneeus, priest of the Institute of Schönstatt Fathers, Chilean Catholic bishop, Bishop of Chillán, then Archbishop of La Serena, resigned due to never-proven allegations of sexual abuse
- José Cubero Sánchez, Spanish bullfighter who was killed in the bullring at Colmenar Viejo in 1985
- Jose Antonio de Cuervo, Mexican on whose land granted by King Ferdinand VI of Spain the first blue agave was planted for the production of tequila
- Jose Maria Guadalupe Cuervo y Montana, son of Jose Antonio de Cuervo, first to produce tequila in Mexico
- José Cura, Argentine tenor
- Jose Vicente de la Quadra Lugo, known as Vicente Cuadra, Nicaraguan landowner and politician, 4th President of Nicaragua
- Josse van Clichtove, known in Latin as Judocus Clichtoveus Neoportuensis, Belgian theologian, Humanist, teacher and author, profuse antagonist of Martin Luther, librarian and tutor at the Sorbonne

==== D ====
- José van Dam (Joseph, Baron Van Damme), Belgian bass-baritone
- José Damen, Dutch swimmer, Olympics competitor
- José da Silva Varela, known as Ze, São Toméan football player
- José Antonio Dávila Morales, post-modern Puerto Rican poet
- José Segundo Decoud, Paraguayan politician and judge
- José Luis DeJesús, American baseball player
- José Delbo, Argentine comics artist
- José Manuel Rodriguez Delgado, Spanish-born professor of physiology at Yale University
- José Dias Coelho, Portuguese painter and sculptor, opposed to the dictatorship of Oliveira Salazar, assassinated by the security agency International and State Defense Police
- José Diaz, sergeant in the Toa Alta Militia, defended Puerto Rico from British invasion in 1797
- José Diaz, Argentine football player and Olympics competitor
- José Diaz, Spanish rugby union player
- Jose Diaz-Balart, Cuban-American journalist and television anchorman
- José Diaz Ramos, Spanish trade unionist and politician
- José Antonio Díaz, Cuban fencer and Olympics competitor
- Jose Antonio Diaz, known as Coco, Joey or Karate, Cuban-born American comedian, actor and podcast host
- José Daniel Díaz Robertti, Venezuelan freestyle wrestler
- José Eduvigis Díaz Vera, Paraguayan general, leading figure in the Paraguayan War, hero of the Battle of Curupayty
- José Enrique Díaz Barrera, Spanish football manager
- José Félix Díaz, American politician, former member of the Florida House of Representatives
- José Guadalupe A. Díaz Rivera, Spanish football manager and former player
- José Ignacio Díaz Velázquez, Spanish racewalker and Olympics competitor
- José Luis Díaz, Argentine professional football player
- José Manuel Díaz Fernández, Spanish football player and manager
- José Manuel Díaz Gallego, Spanish international road cyclist
- José María Díaz, Spanish journalist, Romantic style playwright
- José Narciso Díaz, Cuban fencer and Olympics competitor
- José Pedro Díaz, Uruguayan intellectual, author and poet, listed among the writers known as the Generación del 45
- Jose Rafael Diaz, nicknamed as "Jumbo", Dominican-American professional baseball player
- José Gabriel Diaz Cueva, Ecuadorian Catholic bishop, Auxiliary bishop of Guayaquil, Auxiliary Bishop of Cuenca, then Bishop of Azogues
- José Ramón Díaz Hernández, Puerto Rican politician and senator
- José van Dijck, pseudonym for Johanna Francisca Theodora Maria "José" van Dijck, Dutch author and professor of comparative media studies, University of Amsterdam
- José Maximino Eusebio Domínguez y Rodríguez, Cuban Catholic bishop, Auxiliary bishop of San Cristóbal de la Habana, then Bishop of Matanzas
- José Doreste, Spanish sailboat racer
- José Doth de Oliveira, Brazilian Catholic bishop, Bishop of Iguatu
- Jose Philip D'Souza, Indian politician

==== E ====
- José Maria de Eça de Queiroz, Portuguese writer
- José Echegaray, Spanish statesman, dramatist and Nobel Prize in Literature
- Juan José Eguiara y Eguren, Mexican of Basque descent, Catholic scholar and bishop, Bishop of Chilapa, member of the faculty and later rector of the University of Mexico, author of the incomplete Bibliotheca mexicana, the country's first comprehensive bibliography of ideas
- José Mariano Elízaga, Mexican Romantic composer, music theorist, pianist, organist and music teacher
- José Eugenio Ellauri y Obes, Uruguayan lawyer and politician, 9th President of Uruguay
- José Longinos Ellauri Fernández, Uruguayan politician, father of José Eugenio Ellauri y Obes
- Jose Marcelo Ejercito Sr., commonly known as Joseph "Erap" Estrada, 13th president of the Philippines
- José de Escandón, Spanish noble titled 1st Count of Sierra Gorda, soldier to the rank of colonel in New Spain where he was engaged in various military actions, led the colonization of Nuevo Santander, became known as the "father of the lower Rio Grande Valley"
- José Gonzalo Escobar, Mexican Army general and leader of the failed Escobar Rebellion
- José Luis Escobar Alas, Salvadoran Catholic bishop, Auxiliary bishop then Bishop of San Vicente, Archbishop of San Salvador
- José Manuel Estepa Llaurens, Spanish Catholic bishop and cardinal, Auxiliary Bishop of Madrid, then Ordinary of the Military Archbishopric of Spain, one of six bishops who redacted the Catholic Catechism, made Cardinal by Pope Benedict XVI
- José Félix Estigarribia Insaurralde, Paraguayan agronomist, diplomat, army officer at the rank of Marshal and Commander-in-Chief of the armed services, decorated war hero, 34th President of Paraguay, self-appointed dictator

==== F ====
- José Fabio, Paraguayan basketball player
- José Freire Falcão, Brazilian Catholic bishop and cardinal, Archbishop of Brasilia, made a Cardinal by Pope John Paul II in 1988
- José Carlos Frita Falcão, Portuguese matador
- José Luis Falcón, Spanish athlete and Olympics competitor
- José Feliciano (José Monserrate Feliciano García), Puerto Rican guitarist, singer and songwriter
- José Carlos Fernández González, Bolivian professional football player
- José Carlos Fernández Piedra, nicknamed as Zlatan, Peruvian professional football player
- José Delfín Fernández Gómez, Cuban-born American professional baseball player
- José Luis Fernández, Venezuelan baseball player
- José dos Santos Ferreira, Macanese poet and writer
- José Ferrer Esteve de Fujadas, Spanish guitarist and composer
- José Vicente Ferrer de Otero y Cintrón, Puerto Rican actor, film and stage director, winner of the Academy Award
- José Silvestre Ferreira Bossa, Portuguese noble and military officer to the rank of general, served twice as Governor of Angola, as Governor of Macau, and as Governor of Mozambique, was Plenipotentiary Minister to China
- José María Figueres Olsen, Costa Rican businessman and politician, 42nd President of Costa Rica with special interests in climate change, Sustainable development and technology
- José Manuel Figueroa, Jr., Mexican-born American singer, songwriter, and actor
- Chico Flores, born José Manuel Flores Moreno, Spanish professional football player
- Joey Florez, born José Florez Betancourt, American scholar and cultural critic
- José Joaquín Flórez Hernández, Colombian Catholic bishop, Archbishop of Ibagué
- José Miguel da Rocha Fonte, Portuguese-born international professional football player
- Giuseppe "José" Foralosso, Brazilian Catholic bishop, Bishop of Marabá
- José Gil Fortoul, Venezuelan writer, historian, politician and a member of Venezuelan Positivism, supporter of Juan Vicente Gómez's dictatorship, President of Venezuela
- José Gaspar Rodríguez de Francia y Velasco, Paraguayan lawyer and politician, first dictator after the independence of Paraguay, commonly known as El Supremo, a reference to his official title "Supreme and Perpetual Dictator of Paraguay"
- José Franco (disambiguation), several people
- José Frèches, French historical novelist
- José Freire de Oliveira Neto, Brazilian Catholic bishop, Bishop of Mossoró
- José de Freitas Ribeiro, Portuguese naval officer, served as acting Governor-General of Mozambique, member of the Constitutional Junta that ruled Portugal for one day in 1915, served as Governor-General of Portuguese India

==== G ====
- José Gabriel (1896–1957), Spanish-born Argentine writer and essayist
- José de Jesús García Ayala, Mexican Catholic bishop, first appointed as Auxiliary Bishop and then as Bishop of Campeche
- José García Hernández (1915–2000), Spanish politician
- José Mariano Garibi y Rivera, Mexican Catholic bishop and cardinal, first appointed as Auxiliary bishop of the Archdiocese of Guadalajara, then as Coadjutor bishop of the same See, and finally as Archbishop of Guadalajara, made Cardinal by Pope John XXIII in 1958, first Mexican so appointed
- José Manuel Gallegos, American Catholic priest and politician, Territory of New Mexico delegate to the US Congress
- José Hugo Garaycoa Hawkins, Peruvian Catholic bishop, Auxiliary bishop of Lima, then Bishop of Tacna y Moquegua
- José Luis García-López, Spanish comic book artist
- Mario José García Rodriguez, Spanish water polo player and Olympics competitor
- José Gaspar, Spanish pirate, known as the last of the Buccaneers
- José Martín Antonio Gautier Benítez, Puerto Rican Romantic poet
- José Aurelio Gay, Spanish football player and manager
- Juan José Gerardi Conedera, Guatemalan Catholic bishop and human rights defender especially Mayan rights, Bishop of Verapaz, Bishop of Quiché, then Auxiliary Bishop of Santiago de Guatemala, assassinated by members of the Salvadoran military
- José Gil, born in Portuguese Mozambique, Portuguese philosopher and author
- José Giovanni, French-Swiss writer and film director
- José Giral y Pereira, Spanish politician, served as Prime Minister during the Second Spanish Republic
- José Goldemberg, Brazilian physicist, university professor, scientific leader and Research scientist, leading expert on energy and environmental issues
- José Roilo Gólez, Filipino politician
- José Gomes Ferreira, Portuguese poet and fiction writer, activist against the dictatorship of Oliveira Salazar
- José Gómez Ortega, known as Joselito, famous Spanish matador
- José Horacio Gómez, Mexican-born US Catholic bishop, Auxiliary Bishop of Denver, Archbishop of San Antonio, then Archbishop of Los Angeles
- José Miguel Gómez Rodríguez, Colombian Catholic bishop, Bishop of Líbano–Honda, then Bishop of Facatativá
- José Aparecido Gonçalves de Almeida, Brazilian Catholic bishop, appointed as an officer and the Under-Secretary of the Pontifical Council for Legislative Texts, then Auxiliary Bishop of Brasília
- José González, Swedish-born Argentine singer and songwriter
- José González, Mexican professional sport shooter and Olympics competitor
- José González, Puerto Rican professional sport shooter and Olympics competitor
- José González, Chilean professional basketball player and Olympics competitor
- José González, Spanish sport shooter and Olympics competitor
- José González, Spanish swimmer and Olympics competitor
- José Luis González, Mexican composer
- Jose "Pepe" Gonzalez, Spanish comic book artist
- José Rafael González, Dominican-American professional baseball player
- Jose Alejandro Gonzalez Jr., senior United States district judge of the United States District Court for the Southern District of Florida
- José Antonio González, Spanish racewalker and Olympics competitor
- José Antonio Estrada González, Cuban baseball player and Olympics medallist
- Jose B. Gonzalez, Salvadoran Latino poet and educator
- José Emilio González, also known as Josemilio González, Puerto Rican writer, literary critic, editor, university lecturer and politician, winner of the American Book Award
- José Francisco González, known as Paton, Venezuelan professional football player
- José Froilán González, Argentine award-winning racing driver
- José Huertas González, known as "The Prophet" and later as "Invader I", Puerto Rican professional wrestler
- José Luis González, Puerto Rican essayist, novelist, Short story writer, university professor, and journalist
- Jose Luis Gonzalez, also known as J.L. Goez and Joe L. Gonzalez, designer, painter, muralist, sculptor, restorer, ceramicist, importer, and arts administrator
- José Maldonado González, last president of the Spanish Republican government in Exile
- José Ignacio González Catalán, Chilean professional football player
- José Ramón González, Puerto Rican economist and businessman
- José Antonio González Caviedes, Spanish politician
- José Luis González China, Mexican football manager and former player
- José Luis González Dávila, known as La Calaca, Mexican professional football player and two-time Olympics competitor
- José Manuel González Santamaría, Spanish Paralympic athlete and medallist
- José González Díez, Spanish Catholic friar of the Dominican Order (O.P.) and bishop, Bishop of Palemcia, Bishop of Pamplona (now known as the Archdiocese of Pamplona y Tudela, Archbishop of Santiago de Compostela, and Archbishop of Burgos
- José González Ganoza, Peruvian international football player
- José González García, Mexican chess grandmaster
- José Manuel González Hernández, nicknamed El Meme, Salvadoran professional football player
- José del Carmen González Joly, Panamanian professional football player
- José González-Lander, Venezuelan-born civil engineer, responsible for the planning, design and construction of the Caracas Metro
- José Manuel González López, known professionally as José, Spanish football player and coach
- José Eleuterio González-Mendoza, Mexican physician and philanthropist, founder of two major hospitals
- José González Morfin, Mexican politician and lawyer
- José González Ortiz, Puerto Rican politician and former mayor of Luquillo
- José M. González-Páramo, Spanish economist and bank executive, economic adviser to several major public and private institutions including the Banco de España, the European Commission, the International Monetary Fund and the World Bank Group
- José Norberto Francisco González Rubio, O.F.M., religious name was José María de Jesús, Franciscan friar and Catholic priest, prominent in the early history of California
- José Antonio González de Salas, Spanish humanist and writer
- José Luis González Sánchez, Spanish award-winning runner
- José Joel González Sandoval, Mexican professional football player
- José Emilio González Velázquez, Puerto Rican politician and Senator
- Antonio José González Zumárraga, Ecuadorian Catholic bishop and cardinal, member of the Society of Jesus (S.J.), Auxiliary bishop of Quito, Bishop of Machala, Coadjutor bishop and then Archbishop of Quito, made a Cardinal by Pope John Paul II in 2001
- José del Carmen Soberanis González, Mexican politician
- José Gottardi Cristelli, Italian-born Uruguayan Catholic bishop, member of the Salesians of Don Bosco (S.D.B.), Auxiliary bishop of Mercedes, Archbishop of Montevideo
- José Greci, Italian actress
- José Greco, American flamenco dancer and choreographer
- José de Grimaldo y Gutiérrez de Solórzano, Spanish noble titled 1st Marquess of Grimaldo and statesman, served three times as Secretary of the Universal Bureau under King Philip V
- José Nicomedes Grossi, Brazilian Catholic bishop, Bishop of Bom Jesus da Lapa
- José María Guerrero de Arcos y Molina, Nicaraguan-born politician, Acting Head of State of Honduras, then Head of State of Nicaragua
- José Patricio Guggiari Corniglione, Paraguayan politician, 32nd President of Paraguay
- José María Guido, 33rd President of Argentina
- José Ángel Gurría, Mexican economist and diplomat, Secretary General of the OECD

==== H ====
- Jose ben Halafta (Yose ben Halafta. Hebrew: רבי יוסי בן חלפתא), leading 2nd century CE scholar of halakha and aggadah, mentioned frequently in the Mishnah
- José-Maria de Heredia, Cuban-born French poet
- José Hernandez, Argentine journalist, poet, and politician, best known as author of the epic poem Martín Fierro
- José Gregorio Hernández, Venezuelan physician, noted for treating the poor without charge, since his death has gained popular recognition in Latin America and Spain as a source of miraculous healing and is invoked by the name "José Gregoriano", given the title "Venerable" by Pope Francis, now being considered for beatification
- José M. Hernández, American astronaut
- José María Hernández González, Mexican Catholic bishop, Bishop of Chilapa (now known as the Diocese of Chilpancingo-Chilapa), then Bishop of Netzahualcóyotl (now known as the Diocese of Valle de Chalco)
- José Joaquín de Herrera, Mexican politician, general in the Mexican Army during the Mexican–American War, three times President of Mexico
- José Hoebee, Dutch pop singer
- José Maria de Sousa Horta e Costa, also known as José Maria de Sousa Horta e Costa (de) Almeida e Vasconcelos, Portuguese soldier, politician and diplomat, twice Governor of Macau, and Governor of Portuguese India

==== I ====
- José María Iglesias Inzáurraga, Mexican lawyer, professor, journalist and politician, President of the Supreme Court, Interim President of Mexico
- José Miguel Infante y Rojas, Chilean statesman and politician, leader under the junta government
- José Miguel Insulza, Chilean politician, 9th Secretary General of the Organization of American States
- José Ingenieros, born as Giuseppe Ingegnieri, Argentine physician, pharmacist, positivist philosopher and essayist
- José Iturbi, Spanish conductor, harpsichordist and pianist
- José Heriberto Izquierdo Mena, Colombian-born international football player
- José María Izuzquiza Herranz, Spanish-born Peruvian Catholic bishop, member of the Society of Jesus (S.J.), Bishop of the Apostolic Vicariate of Jaén in Peru

==== J ====
- José James, American musician, composer and bandleader
- José Jardim, Curaçaoan politician
- José de Jesús, nicknamed Cagüitas, Puerto Rican professional boxer
- José de Jesús, Puerto Rican long-distance runner
- Jose de Jesus, often referred to as Ping de Jesus, Filipino politician
- José Luis de Jesús Miranda, Puerto Rican-born American evangelist who claimed to be Jesus Christ and the Antichrist
- José Jiménez Fernández, known as Joselito, Spanish child star singer and songwriter, entrepreneur in adulthood, jailed for gun and drug trafficking
- José Alfredo Jiménez-Sandoval, Mexican singer and songwriter of rancheras
- José Mariano Jiménez Wald, Peruvian lawyer, jurist and politician, twice Prime Minister of Peru
- José María Jover Zamora, Spanish historian, university professor, influential in the development of Spanish historiography
- José Esteve Juan, also known as Giuseppe Esteve Stefano, Spanish Catholic bishop, Bishop of Vieste, then Bishop of Orihuela (now known as the Diocese of Orihuela-Alicante)

==== L ====
- José de La Mar, Peruvian military leader to the rank of Brigadier and politician, 3rd President of Peru
- José María Cirarda Lachiondo, Spanish Catholic bishop, Auxiliary Bishop of Seville, Bishop of Santander, Bishop of Córdoba, and Archbishop of Pamplona y Tudela
- José Luis Lacunza Maestrojuán, Spanish-born Panamanian Catholic bishop and cardinal, friar of the Order of Augustinian Recollects (O.A.R.), Auxiliary bishop of Panama, Bishop of Chitré, then Bishop of David, made a Cardinal by Pope Francis in 2015, the first Panamanian to be so appointed
- José María García Lahiguera, Spanish Catholic bishop, Auxiliary Bishop of Madrid, Bishop of Huelva, Archbishop of Valencia, beatified by Pope Benedict XVI in 2011
- José María Larrauri Lafuente, Spanish Catholic bishop, first as Auxiliary Bishop of Pamplona (now known as the Archdiocese of Pamplona y Tudela, then as Bishop of Vitoria
- José María Queipo de Llano y Ruiz de Saravia, known in Spain as Conde de Toreno, Spanish noble under the title 7th Count of Toreno and statesman, served as Prime Minister under Queen Isabella II
- José Paciano Laurel y García, Philippine judge and politician, first and only president of the brief Second Philippine Republic
- José Lebrún Moratinos, Venezuelan Catholic bishop and cardinal, Auxiliary bishop of Maracaibo, Bishop of Maracay, Bishop of Valencia en Venezuela (now known as the Archdiocese of Valencia in Venezuela), then Archbishop of Caracas, made a Cardinal by Pope John Paul II in 1983
- José da Avé-Maria Leite da Costa e Silva, Portuguese friar of the Trinitarian Order and Catholic bishop, became rector of Coimbra's Trinitarian college, then appointed as inquirer (inquisitor) for the Portuguese Inquisition, appointed as Bishop of Angra in the Azores
- José García de León y Pizarro, Spanish statesman, served as First Secretary of State under King Ferdinand VI
- José Leonilson Bezerra Dias, Brazilian painter, designer and sculptor, represented in major international collections
- José Lewgoy, Brazilian-born American television, film, and theatre actor
- José Lezama Lima, Cuban writer and poet, considered one of the most influential figures in Latin American literature
- José Gregorio Liendo Vera, Chilean political activist
- José de Lima, Brazilian Catholic bishop, Bishop of Itumbiara, then Bishop of Sete Lagoas
- José Yves Limantour y Márquez, Mexican financier and Secretary of Finance
- José Limón, Mexican modern dancer and choreographer
- José María Linares Lizarazu, 16th President of Bolivia then self-declared "Dictator for Life" until overthrown and exiled for life
- José Linhares, Brazilian lawyer, 14th President of Brazil
- José Jorge Loayza, Peruvian lawyer, jurist and politician, three times Prime Minister of Peru
- José Cortés López, Spanish magistrate
- José López Domínguez, Spanish military to the rank of colonel and politician, served as Prime Minister under King Alfonso XIII
- José Ivo Lorscheiter, Brazilian Catholic bishop, Auxiliary bishop of Porto Alegre, then Bishop of Santa Maria (now known as the Archdiocese of Santa Maria, being a proponent of Liberation theology led him into debate with Pope John Paul II and Cardinal Ratzinger, Prefect of the Congregation for the Doctrine of the Faith
- José Guadalupe Padilla Lozano, Mexican Catholic bishop, Bishop of Veracruz

==== M ====
- José Ulises Macías Salcedo, Mexican Catholic bishop, Bishop of Mexicali, then Archbishop of Hermosillo
- José Malcampo y Monge, Spanish noble under the title 3rd Marquis of San Rafael, admiral and politician, served as Prime Minister under King Amadeo I
- José de Jesús Madera Uribe, American member of the Missionaries of the Holy Spirit (M.Sp.S.) and Catholic bishop, Coadjutor bishop then Bishop of Fresno, then Auxiliary bishop to the Archdiocese for the Military Services, USA
- José Vital Branco Malhoa, known generally as José Malhoa, Portuguese painter
- José Manuel da Câmara de Atalaia, Portuguese statesman, Catholic bishop and cardinal, before episcopacy appointed to a number of positions by King John V including judge of the Supreme Court of the Inquisition of Lisbon, and Deputy for the Board of the Three States, then by the king's direction to Pope Benedict XIV made Cardinal in 1750, elected as Patriarch of Lisbon in 1754 under the title Dom José I
- José Mari Manzanares, professional name of José María Dols Abellán, Spanish bullfighter
- José Mari Manzanares, professional name of José María Dols Samper, Spanish bullfighter (son of above)
- José Carlos Mariátegui, Peruvian intellectual, journalist, political philosopher, and activist
- José Marin, Spanish Baroque harpist, guitarist and composer
- José Romão Martenetz, Ukrainian-born monk of the Order of Saint Basil the Great (O.S.B.M.) and Brazilian Ukrainian Greek Catholic bishop, Assistant bishop of Rio de Janeiro, Apostolic Exarch (Archbishop) of Brazil, first Eparch (Bishop) of the newly created Eparchy of São João Batista em Curitiba
- José Julián Martí Pérez, Cuban poet, essayist, journalist, translator, professor, publisher and national hero, recognised as an important revolutionary philosopher, political theorist and contributor to Latin American literature
- José Martí y Monsó, Spanish painter, art professor, researcher and museum official, recognised as an expert on Castilian art
- José Luis Martí Soler, retired Spanish professional football player and manager
- José María Martín de Herrera y de la Iglesia, Spanish-born Catholic bishop and cardinal who also served in Cuba, Archbishop of Santiago de Cuba, then Archbishop of Santiago de Compostela, made Cardinal by Pope Leo XIII in 1897
- José Isaac Martínez Ahumada (José Martínez "Limeño"), Spanish bullfighter
- José Antonio Martínez de Aldunate y Garcés de Marcilla, Chilean Catholic bishop, Bishop of Huamanga (now known as the Archdiocese of Ayacucho), Bishop of Santiago de Chile, then Vice President of the 1810 Junta of Chile
- José João da Conceição Gonçalves Mattoso, Portuguese Mediaevalist historian and professor
- José Clemente Maurer, German-born Bolivian Catholic bishop and cardinal, member of the Congregation of the Most Holy Redeemer or Redemptorists (C.Ss.R.), Assistant Bishop of La Paz (now known as the Archdiocese of La Paz), then Archbishop of Sucre, made Cardinal by Pope Paul VI in 1967, the first Bolivian to be so appointed
- José Agustín Mauri, Argentine-born Italian professional football player
- Juan José Medina, President of the Provisional Junta of Paraguay
- José Carlos Melo, Brazilian Catholic bishop, first as AuxiliaryBishop of São Salvador da Bahia, then as Archbishop of Maceió
- José Mendes, Portuguese sprinter, Olympics competitor
- José Fernando Ferreira Mendes, often referred to as José F.F. Mendes, Portuguese physicist (statistical physics) and professor of physics, best known for his work in the field of network theory
- José João Pimenta Costa Mendes, Portuguese cyclist and international competitor
- José Francisco Miguel António de Mendonça or Mendoça, Portuguese Catholic bishop and cardinal, rector of the University of Coimbra, nominated by King Peter III as Patriarch of Lisbon in 1786 with the name Dom José II, made Cardinal by Pope Pius XI in 1788
- José Miller, also known as Dr Josie Miller, leader of Cuba's Jewish community and their spokesman with the Cuban Government under Fidel Castro's presidency
- José Adolfo Mojica Morales, Salvadoran Catholic bishop, Bishop of Sonsonate
- José Rafael Molina Ureña, Dominican politician and diplomat, served briefly as Provisional President after the Dominican Civil War, then terms as Permanent Representative to the United Nations and Ambassador to France
- José Luis Mollaghan, Argentine Catholic bishop, Auxiliary bishop of Buenos Aires, Bishop of San Miguel, then Archbishop of Rosario, assigned by Pope Francis to the Congregation for the Doctrine of the Faith to work on the handling of clerical pedophilia
- José Gregorio Monagas, Venezuelan general and politician, President of Venezuela, brother of José Tadeo Monagas
- José Ruperto Monagas, President of Venezuela, son of José Tadeo Monagas
- José Tadeo Monagas Burgos, hero of the Venezuelan War of Independence, twice President of Venezuela
- José María Moncada Tapia, Nicaraguan revolutionary and politician, 19th President of Nicaragua
- José Pablo Moncayo García, Mexican pianist, percussionist, music teacher, composer and conductor
- José Moñino y Redondo, Spanish noble titled 1st Count of Floridablanca, jurist, reformist, statesman, served as First Secretary of State under Kings Charles III and Charles IV, usually referred to in modern Spain as Conde de Floridablanca, the plant genus Monnina was named after him
- José Pedro Montero De Candia, Paraguayan paediatrician, university professor and politician, 27th President of Paraguay
- José María Montes, Argentine Catholic bishop, Auxiliary Archbishop of La Plata, Bishop of Chascomús
- José María Teclo Morelos Pérez y Pavón, Mexican Catholic priest and rebel leader in the Mexican War of Independence, defrocked and executed for treason
- José Vianna da Motta (sometimes spelt Viana da Mota), Portuguese pianist, teacher and composer, last pupil of Franz Liszt, the Vianna da Motta International Music Competition was founded in 1957 in his honour
- José Mourinho, Portuguese professional football coach and former football player
- José David Moya Rojas, Colombian professional football player
- José Mujica, Venezuelan professional baseball player
- José Alberto "Pepe" Mujica Cordano (1935–2025): Uruguayan politician, former guerrilla with the Tupamaros, 40th President of Uruguay
- José Celestino Bruno Mutis y Bosio, Spanish Catholic priest, medical practitioner, botanist, mathematician and artist

==== N ====
- José Luis Narom, also known as José Luis Morán, German-born Spanish composer
- José Alves dos Santos Neto, Brazilian professional basketball coach
- José Pires de Almeida Neto, Brazilian jazz guitarist
- José Sebastião de Almeida Neto, Portuguese Catholic bishop and cardinal who also served in Africa, joined the Franciscan friars (O.F.M. Disc.) after ordination taking the religious name Joseph of the Sacred Heart, nominated by King Luís I first as Bishop of Angola e Congo (now known as the Archdiocese of Luanda), then as Patriarch of Lisbon using the name Dom José III, made a Cardinal by Pope Leo XIII in 1884
- Bernard Joseph Nolker, known in Brazil as Bernardo José Nolker, American-born Brazilian Catholic bishop, member of the Congregation of the Most Holy Redeemer (C.Ss.R), Bishop of Paranaguá
- José Maurício Nunes Garcia, Brazilian Catholic priest and Classical composer
- José Neves (born 1974), Portuguese billionaire businessman, founder of Farfetch
- José Núñez, Nicaraguan politician, several times Head of State of Nicaragua

==== O ====
- Ignacio Montes de Oca y Obregón, Mexican Catholic bishop, Bishop of Ciudad Victoria, then Bishop of San Luis (now known as the Archdiocese of San Luis Potosí
- Juan José Omella i Omella, Spanish Catholic bishop and cardinal, Auxiliary Bishop of Zaragoza, Bishop of Barbastro-Monzón, Apostolic Administrator of Huesca and of Jaca, Bishop of Calahorra y La Calzada-Logroño, and Archbishop of Barcelona, made Cardinal by Pope Francis
- José Clemente Orozco, Mexican early modern artist especially known as a genre painter, muralist and lithographer
- José Francisco Orozco y Jiménez, Mexican Catholic bishop, Bishop of Chiapas, then Archbishop of Guadalajara
- José María Ortega Cano, Spanish matador
- José Ortega y Gasset, Spanish philosopher
- Jose Ortiz, Puerto Rican-born American jockey
- José Ortiz Bernal, Spanish football player
- José Alfredo Ortiz Dalliot, Puerto Rican attorney and politician
- José Ortiz-Echagüe, Spanish entrepreneur, industrial and military engineer, pilot and photographer, founder of Construcciones Aeronáuticas SA and honorary lifetime President of SEAT (Sociedad Española de Automóviles de Turismo)
- José Daniel Ortiz Flores, Dominican-born American baseball player
- José Luis Ortiz Irizarry, Puerto Rican-born American baseball player
- José Luis Ortiz Moreno, Spanish astronomer, former vice-president of the Instituto de Astrofísica de Andalucía
- José Ortiz Moya, Spanish comics artist
- José Rafael "Piculín" Ortiz Rijos, Puerto Rican-born international basketball player
- José Tomás Ovalle y Bezanilla, Chilean politician, served twice as provisional President of Chile

==== P ====
- José Padilla, also known as Abdullah al-Muhajir or Muhajir Abdullah, American convicted of aiding terrorists
- José Bastos Padilha Neto, Brazilian film director, producer and screenwriter
- José Antonio Páez Herrera, leading military figure in Simón Bolívar rebellion against the Spanish Crown in the Venezuelan War of Independence and then in the independence of Venezuela from Bolivar's Gran Colombia, 1st Head of State after declaring independence from Gran Colombia in 1830, and again in 1839–1843, later exiled then appointed as president on his return in 1851
- José Palmeira Lessa, Brazilian Catholic bishop, Auxiliary bishop of São Sebastião do Rio de Janeiro, Bishop of Propriá, Coadjutor Archbishop then Archbishop of Aracajú
- José Manuel Inocencio Pando Solares, politician, leading figure in civil war, explorer, later 30th President of Bolivia
- José Pardo y Barreda, Peruvian politician, 51st Prime Minister of Peru, twice President of Peru
- José Parlá, American painter, sculptor and photographer
- José Serofia Palma, Filipino Catholic bishop, Archbishop of Palo, Archbishop of Cebu, president of the Catholic Bishops' Conference of the Philippines
- José Paronella, Spanish immigrant to Australia, founder of Paronella Park
- Juan José Esteban Paso, Argentine professor, lawyer and Revolutionary leader, member of the Primera Junta and Junta Grande, member of the First and Second, Triumvirates, representative to the Congress of Tucumán
- José Manuel Pasquel, Peruvian soldier to the rank of second lieutenant and Catholic bishop, Archbishop of Lima
- José Patiño y Rosales, Spanish statesman, served as 1st Secretary of State under King Philip V
- José Paulino de Almeida e Albuquerque, Brazilian military and politician
- José Ignacio Pavón, Mexican lawyer, jurist and politician, unconstitutional substitute President of Mexico
- José María Paz, Argentine military figure notable in the Argentine War of Independence and the Argentine Civil War
- José Luís Peixoto, Portuguese novelist, poet and playwright
- José Néstor Pékerman Krim, Argentine football coach and manager
- José Rafael Peralta, Dominican-born American politician, representing District 13 in the New York State Senate
- José Francisco Peraza Polo, Venezuelan-born American professional baseball player
- José Pedro Pérez-Llorca, Spanish lawyer, politician and contributor to the 1978 Spanish Constitution
- José Luis Perales, Spanish singer and songwriter
- José de Almeida Batista Pereira, Brazilian Catholic bishop, Auxiliary bishop of Niteroi, Bishop of Sete Lagaos, then Bishop of Guaxupé
- José de Aquino Pereira, Brazilian Catholic bishop, Bishop of Dourados, Bishop of Presidente Prudente, then Bishop of São José do Rio Preto
- José Joaquín Pérez Mascayano, Chilean politician, served as the President of Chile
- José de Jesús Pimiento Rodríguez, Colombian Catholic bishop and cardinal, Auxiliary bishop of Pasto, Bishop of Montería, Bishop of Garzón, then Archbishop of Manizales, made a Cardinal by Pope Francis in 2015
- José Laureano Pineda Ugarte, Nicaraguan politician, twice Head of State of Nicaragua
- José Piñera, Chilean economist, architect of Chile's private Pension system
- José María Pino Suárez, Mexican statesman, jurist, poet, journalist and revolutionary, 7th Vice President of Mexico, assassinated in 1913 as an outcome of the period of civil unrest called Ten Tragic Days
- José Manuel Pirela, Venezuelan-American professional baseball player
- José Maria Pires, Brazilian Catholic bishop, Bishop of Araçuaí, then Archbishop of Paraíba
- José Pizarro, Spanish-born UK chef, restaurateur and author of cookbooks
- José da Cruz Policarpo, Portuguese Catholic bishop, cardinal and writer, before episcopacy director of the Penafirme seminary, rector of the Olivais seminary, dean of the Theological Faculty of the Portuguese Catholic University and two terms as the university's rector, then Auxiliary bishop of Lisbon, Coadjutor Archbishop of Lisbon, and Patriarch of Lisbon in 1998 named as Dom José IV, made Cardinal by Pope John Paul II in 2001
- Jose Casiano Portilla, Mexican-born American football player
- José Guillermo Abel López Portillo y Pacheco, Mexican lawyer and politician, 51st President of Mexico
- José Guadalupe Posada Aguilar, Mexican political printmaker and engraver
- José Maria da Ponte e Horta, Portuguese noble, colonial administrator and soldier, formerly Governor of Angola, Governor of Macau and Governor of Mozambique
- José María Pérez de Urdininea, third President of Bolivia and the first to be born in that country
- Jose Porunnedom, Indian-born Syro-Malabar Catholic bishop, Eparch (Bishop) of Mananthavady
- José Posada y Herrera, Spanish jurist and politician, served as Prime Minister under King Alfonso XII
- José Ángel Pozo la Rosa, Spanish professional football player
- José Pedro Pozzi, Italian born, member of Salesians of Don Bosco, Bishop of Alto Valle del Río Negro
- José Antônio Rezende de Almeida Prado, known as Almeida Prado, Brazilian composer and pianist
- Jose Prakash, Indian singer and film actor
- José Prieto, Mexican cyclist and Olympics competitor
- José Joaquín Prieto Vial, Chilean military figure and politician, twice President of Chile
- José Antonio Primo de Rivera y Sáenz de Heredia, Spanish lawyer, noble, politician, 1st Duke of Primo de Rivera, 3rd Marquis of Estella, founder of the Falange Española
- José Manuel Puig Casauranc, Mexican medical practitioner, politician, diplomat and journalist

==== Q ====
- José Humberto Quintero Parra, Venezuelan Catholic bishop and cardinal, Coadjutor Archbishop then Archbishop of Mérida, made Cardinal by Pope John XXIII in 1961, the first Venezuelan so appointed
- José Quiroga, Chilean-born cardiologist now based in America, co-founder and medical director of the Program for Torture Victims, vice-president of the International Rehabilitation Council for Torture Victims

==== R ====
- José Ramirez, Spanish luthier and founder of Ramirez Guitars
- José Ramírez III, Spanish luthier and practitioner in Ramirez Guitars
- José Carlos Ramírez, American professional boxer, Olympics competitor
- José Enrique Ramírez, Dominican-born American baseball player
- José Luis Ramírez, retired Mexican boxer, two-time World Lightweight Champion
- José Luis Ramírez, Mexican NASCAR driver
- José Ramos-Horta, East Timorese politician, founder and former member of Fretilin, 2nd President of the Independent Republic of East Timor, Nobel Peace Prize winner
- José Maria Raygada y Gallo, Peruvian politician, twice Prime Minister of Peru
- José Manuel Reina Páez, usually known as Pepe, Spanish international football player
- José Antonio Reyes, Spanish professional football player
- José Bernabé Reyes, Dominican-American baseball player
- José Afonso Ribeiro, Brazilian Catholic bishop, member of the Third Order of Saint Francis, Bishop of Borba
- José Cláudio Ribeiro da Silva, nicknamed Zé Cláudio, Brazilian conservationist and environmentalist, shot and killed in an anti-logging campaign
- José Maria Espírito Santo Silva Ricciardi, Portuguese banker and economist
- José de la Riva-Agüero y Osma, Peruvian noble with the titles 6th Marquès de Montealegre de Aulestia and 5th Marquès de Casa-Dávila, historian, writer and politician, 84th Prime Minister of Peru
- José Mariano de la Cruz de la Riva-Agüero y Sánchez Boquete, Peruvian noble with the title Marqués de Montealegre de Aulestia, soldier, politician, and historian, 1st President of Peru, 2nd President of North Peru
- José Carlos Fulgencio Pedro Regalado de la Riva-Agüero y Looz Corswarem, Belgian-born Peruvian politician and diplomat
- Jose Rivera, American politician, member of the New York State Assembly
- José Rivera, Puerto Rican volleyball player
- José Rivera, playwright, first Puerto Rican screenwriter to be nominated for an Academy Award
- José Antonio Rivera, Puerto Rican-born American professional boxer
- José Eustasio Rivera Salas, Colombian lawyer, poet and author primarily known for his national epic The Vortex
- José Manuel Rivera Galván, Mexican professional football player
- José Rivera Díaz, Puerto Rican businessman and former politician, mayor of Trujillo Alto (1977–1980)
- José Luis Rivera Guerra, Puerto Rican politician
- Jose de Rivera, American abstract sculptor, represented in major collections
- José Protasio Rizal Mercado y Alonso Realonda, Filipino nationalist, author and polymath, ophthalmologist by profession, advocate for independence during the Philippine Revolution and executed for his involvement, now regarded as a national hero
- José Ramón Rodil y Campillo, Spanish noble with the titles 1st Marquis of Rodil and 3rd Viscount of Trobo, military general and statesman, served as Prime Minister under Prince Baldomero Espartero, Regent for Queen Isabella II
- José Enrique Rodó, Uruguayan essayist
- José Antonio Rodríguez Muñoz, Spanish flamenco guitarist, composer and music professor
- José Rodrigues de Souza, Brazilian Catholic bishop, member of the Congregation of the Most Holy Redeemer (C.Ss.R.), Bishop of Juazeiro
- José Luis Rodríguez Zapatero, Spanish lawyer and politician, Prime Minister of Spain
- José Manuel Rodriguez Delgado, Spanish-born American psychologist and university professor, noted for research into mind control through electrical brain stimulation
- José Rodrigues Miguéis, Portuguese translator and writer, self-exiled in the United States, became translator and editor for Reader's Digest
- José Antonio Rodríguez Vega, Spanish serial killer and rapist
- José Casimiro Rondeau Pereyra, general and politician in Argentina and Uruguay in the early 19th century, Supreme Director of the United Provinces of the Río de la Plata, Governor and Captain General of Uruguay
- José Rosales (footballer) (born 1993), Guatemalan footballer
- José Alberto Rozo Gutiérrez, Colombian Catholic bishop, Apostolic Vicar of the Apostolic Vicariate of Puerto Gaitán

==== S ====
- José Sabogal, Peruvian early modern painter and muralist, recognised as a leader in revival of indigenist style
- José de Jesús Sahagún de la Parra, Mexican Catholic bishop, Bishop of Tula, then Bishop of Ciudad Lázaro Cárdenas
- José Hipólito Salas y Toro, Chilean Catholic theologian and bishop, Bishop of Concepción (now known as the Concepción, offered a cardinalate by Pope Pius IX which he refused
- José Mariano Salas, Mexican general, twice Interim President of Mexico, Co-Regent of Mexico under the Second Mexican Empire
- José Salazar López, Mexican Catholic bishop and cardinal, Coadjutor bishop, Bishop of Zamora, then Archbishop of Guadalajara
- José Antonio Salcedo y Ramírez, known as Pepillo, Spanish-born to parents from Santo Domingo, led the civil war for restoration of the Dominican Republic, became 1st head of state after the Spanish withdrawal, later opposed and assassinated by Nationalists allegedly for his support for Spain
- José Andres Salvatierra López, Costa Rican international football player
- José Enrique Sánchez, known professionally as José Enrique, retired Spanish football player
- Jose Tomas Sanchez, Filipino Catholic bishop and cardinal, Auxiliary bishop of Cáceres, Coadjutor bishop then Bishop of Lucena, Archbishop of Nueva Segovia, appointment to the Roman Curia, first to the Congregation for the Evangelization of Peoples then simultaneously to the Congregation for the Clergy and the Administration of the Patrimony of the Apostolic See, made Cardinal Deacon by Pope John Paul II in 1991 and elevated to Cardinal Priest by the same pope in 2002
- José Sánchez-Guerra y Martínez, Spanish journalist, lawyer and politician, Prime Minister under King Alfonso XIII
- José Hernán Sánchez Porras, Venezuelan Catholic bishop, Bishop of the Military Ordinariate of Venezuela
- José María Sánchez-Verdú, Spanish award-winning composer
- José León Sandoval, Nicaraguan politician, Head of State of Nicaragua
- José Francisco de San Martín y Matorras, Argentine general, El Libertador of Argentina, Chile and Peru, member of the Third Triumvirate of Argentina, 1st President of Peru
- José Sanjurjo y Sacanell, Spanish Army general, granted title of 1st Marquis of the Rif (marqués del Rif) by King King Alfonso XIII, nicknamed as El León del Rif
- José Manuel Santana Silvestre, Dominican economist and diplomat, specialist in technology and development
- José Adeón Santos León, Chilean jockey, member of the National Museum of Racing and Hall of Fame
- José Joaquim dos Santos, Portuguese Baroque composer especially of sacred vocal music
- José Hermano Baptista Saraiva, Portuguese professor, historian, jurist, politician and diplomat, writer and television presenter of travel programs
- José de Sousa Saramago, Portuguese author, recipient of the Nobel Prize in literature
- José Manuel Eufrasio Quiroga Sarmiento y Funes, Argentine Catholic bishop, Bishop of San Juan de Cuyo
- José Sarney, 20th Vice President of Brazil, 31st President of Brazil, then President of the Brazilian Senate
- José Trinidad Sepúlveda Ruiz-Velasco, Mexican Catholic bishop, Archbishop of Tuxtla, Bishop of San Juan de los Lagos
- José Luis Serna Alzate, Colombian Catholic bishop, Bishop of Florencia, then first Bishop of the newly created Diocese of Líbano–Honda
- José Serrano Simeón, Spanish composer of zarzuelas
- José Serrato, Uruguayan politician, 24th President of Uruguay
- José da Silva, Portuguese sports shooter and Olympics competitor
- José António Silva, known professionally as José da Silva, Portuguese sprint canoer and Olympics competitor
- José Asunción Silva, Colombian poet, listed among founders of Spanish–American Modernism
- José Graziano da Silva, American-born Brazilian agronomist and writer
- José Gabriel de Silva-Bazán y Waldstein, Spanish noble titled 10th Marquess of Santa Cruz, diplomat, art director, statesman and court official, Ambassador to London, first Director of the Prado Museum, served briefly as First Secretary of State under King Ferdinand VI, Mayordomo mayor (High Steward) to the court of King Ferdinand VII
- José Inácio Ribeiro de Abreu e Lima, priest and lawyer, killed for his involvement with the Pernambucan revolution
- José Benedito Simão, Brazilian Catholic bishop, Auxiliary bishop of São Paulo, then Bishop of Assis
- José Sisto, Commissioner of Guam
- José Sócrates Carvalho Pinto de Sousa, commonly known as José Sócrates, Portuguese politician, 117th Prime Minister of Portugal
- José Song Sui-Wan (traditional Chinese: 宋瑞雲; simplified Chinese: 宋瑞云), Chinese-born Brazilian member of the Salesians of Don Bosco (S.D.B.) and Catholic bishop, Bishop of São Gabriel da Cachoeira
- José Manuel Soria, Spanish academic and politician
- José Rómulo Sosa Ortiz, known professionally as José José, Mexican singer and actor
- Rubin Statham, often referred to as JoséNew Zealand professional tennis player

==== T ====
- José Bernardo de Tagle y Portocarrero, Peruvian noble titled 4th Marquis of Torre Tagle, soldier and politician, 3rd President of Peru
- José Luis Tejada Sorzano, 40th President of Bolivia during the Chaco War
- José Théodore, French Canadian ice hockey goaltender
- José Tomás Pérez Sellés, Spanish classical guitarist and teacher
- José de León Toral, assassin of the Mexican President Álvaro Obregón
- José Torres (disambiguation), several people
- José Félix Trespalacios, Mexican politician and soldier, active in the militia in Chihuahua, 1st Governor of Coahuila y Texas in the United Mexican States
- José Manuel Nunes Salvador Tribolet, Portuguese electrical engineer, professor of information systems at the Technical University of Lisbon, known for his work on speech coding

==== U ====
- José Domingo Ulloa Mendieta, Panamanian friar of the Order of Saint Augustine (O.S.A.) and Catholic bishop, Auxiliary bishop then Archbishop of Panamá, opponent to capital punishment
- José Miguel Ureña Rodriguez, Dominican professional basketball player
- José Félix Evaristo de Uriburu y Álvarez de Arenales, Argentine diplomat and politician, 8th Vice President of Argentina, 1st de facto President of Argentina
- José María Urquinaona y Bidot (or Vidot), Spanish Catholic bishop, Bishop of Barcelona (now known as the Archdiocese of Barcelona
- José María Usandizaga, Spanish Basque composer

==== V ====
- José Bordas Valdez, Dominican politician, 2nd Provisional President appointed by the Congress of the Dominican Republic
- José Valentín, Puerto Rican baseball player
- José Gregorio Valera, Venezuelan revolutionary and politician, President of Venezuela
- José Sótero Valero Ruz, Venezuelan Catholic bishop, Bishop of Guanare
- José Cecilio Díaz Del Valle, nicknamed el sabio (The Wise), Guatemalan-born Mexican philosopher, politician, lawyer, and journalist, author of the Act of Independence of Central America
- José Desiderio Valverde Pérez, Spanish soldier to the rank of general, served with distinction in the Spanish colonies including appointment as 4th and last Captain General of Santo Domingo during the Spanish occupation, after Spanish withdrawal appointed as governor-general of the Philippine islands
- José Rafael Valverde, Dominican-born American baseball player
- Jose Antonio Vargas, Filipino American journalist and Pulitzer Prize winner
- José Dorángel Vargas Gomez, Venezuelan serial killer and cannibal
- José María Vargas Ponce, Venezuelan medical practitioner, revolutionary and politician, President of Venezuela
- José Vasconcelos Calderón, Mexican writer, philosopher and politician
- José Leite de Vasconcelos, Portuguese ethnographer and philologist
- José Mauro de Vasconcelos, Brazilian writer
- José Antonio Vélez Jiménez, known as Ñoño (Ninth), Spanish professional football player
- José Augusto Ferreira Veiga, Viscount of Arneiro, born in Portuguese Macau, Portuguese composer
- José Miguel de Velasco Franco, vice-president then four times President of Bolivia
- José María Tranquilino Francisco de Jesús Velasco Gómez Obregón, generally known as José María Velasco, Mexican painter
- José Nieto Velázquez, Spanish court official, chamberlain to Queen Elisabeth of Spain, keeper of the royal tapestries, possible figure in paintings Portrait of a Man and Las Meninas by his brother Diego Velázquez
- José Velázquez Jiménez, known to the public as José Velez, Spanish singer
- José Raúl Vera López, Mexican friar of the Dominican Order and Catholic bishop, Bishop of Ciudad Altamirano, Coadjutor bishop of San Cristóbal de Las Casas, then Bishop of Saltillo
- José María Verdugo, born in New Spain, soldier from the Presidio of San Diego, granted extensive land in present-day California
- José Carlos Amaral Vieira, Brazilian composer, pianist, and musicologist
- José Luis de Vilallonga, Spanish noble titled Marquis of Castellbell, author and actor
- José Vizcaíno, American baseball player

==== W ====
- José Wilker, Brazilian actor

==== X ====
- José Carlos Caetano Xavier, Portuguese marine biologist and Antarctic explorer, co-founder of the Association of Polar Early Career Scientists (APECS)
- José Nuno Rodrigues Xavier, Portuguese-born UK professional football player
- José Ximénez, also known as José Jiménez or Jusepe Ximénez, Spanish Baroque composer and organist

==== Y ====
- José Antonio Yorba, also known as Don José Antonio Yorba I, Spanish soldier and early settler of Spanish California
- José Yulo Yulo, Filipino lawyer, jurist and politician, Chief Justice of the Supreme Court of the Philippines
- José Francisco Yunes Zorrilla, Filipino politician, Senator of the LXII Legislature of the Mexican Congress

==== Z ====
- José Luis Rodríguez Zapatero, Spanish politician, served for two terms as Prime Minister under King Juan Carlos I
- José Santos Zelaya López, Nicaraguan politician, 11th President of Nicaragua
- Jose Zepeda, American professional boxer
- José Zorrilla y Moral, Spanish Catholic Romantic poet and dramatist
- José Antonio Laureano de Zubiría y Escalante, Mexican Catholic bishop, Bishop of Durango (now known as the Archdiocese of Durango), supporter of the Centralist Republic of Mexico and critic of the United States' control of the northern part of his diocese
- José Zúñiga, Honduran-born American screen and television actor
- José Zúñiga, Mexican Neo-figurative painter, represented internationally in private and public collections
- José de Züñiga, Mexican-born soldier to the ran of lieutenant colonel, settler in California and Arizona, Commandant of the Presidio of San Diego, member of the Third Order of Franciscans

=== Middle name ===
- Agostinho José Sartori, Brazilian Catholic bishop, Bishop of Palmas–Francisco Beltrão
- Airton José dos Santos, Brazilian Catholic bishop, Bishop of Mogi das Cruzes and then Archbishop of Campinas
- Aloysio José Leal Penna, Brazilian Catholic bishop, first as Bishop of Paulo Afonso, then as Archbishop of Botucatu
- Ángel José Macín, Argentine Catholic bishop, Bishop of Reconquista
- António José de Almeida, 6th President of Portugal
- António José de Ávila, 1st Duke of Ávila and Bolama, Portuguese politician
- Antonio José Cavanilles, Spanish taxonomist and botanist
- Antonio José de Irisarri Alonso, Guatemalan statesman, journalist, and politician, served as Interim Supreme Director of Chile, considered as one of the fathers of Chilean journalism
- Antonio José Martínez Palacios, known as Antonio José, Spanish composer
- António José Severim de Noronha, 1st Duke of Terceira, Portuguese military officer to the rank of colonel and statesman
- António José da Silva, Portuguese dramatist
- Antonio José de Sucre y Alcalá, Venezuelan noble with the title Gran Mariscal de Ayacucho, leader in gaining independence for Peru and Bolivia, 2nd President of Bolivia
- Camilo José Cela, Spanish novelist and Nobel Prize in Literature
- Epaminondas José de Araújo, Brazilian Catholic bishop, Bishop of Palmeira dos Índios
- Francisco José de Caldas, known as el sabio (The Wise), Colombian lawyer, army officer to the rank of lieutenant colonel, military engineer, self-taught naturalist, mathematician, geographer and inventor, executed during the Spanish American Reconquista for favouring submission to Spain by taking an oath
- Francisco José Debali, Hungarian-born Uruguayan composer and author of the Uruguayan national anthem
- Francisco José de Goya y Lucientes, Spanish painter
- Francisco José Urrutia Olano, Colombian diplomat and international jurist
- Guillermo José Garlatti, Italian-born Argentine Catholic bishop, Auxiliary bishop of La Plata, Bishop of San Rafael, then Archbishop of Bahía Blanca
- Héctor José Cámpora, Argentine dentist and politician, 38th President of Argentina
- Joaquín José de Melgarejo y Saurín, Spanish noble titled 1st Duke of San Fernando de Quiroga, soldier to the rank of brigadier general and statesman, fought in the Peninsular War served as First Secretary of State under King Ferdinand VI, donated Velázquez's Christ Crucified to Madrid's Prado Museum
- Joaquín José Morón Hidalgo, Venezuelan Catholic bishop, Bishop of Valle de la Pascua, then Bishop of Acarigua–Araure
- Juan José Campanella, Argentine film producer and director
- Juan Cayetano José María Gómez de Portugal y Solís, Mexican seminary professor and Catholic bishop, Bishop of Michoacán (later renamed as the Archdiocese of Michoacán then as the Archdiocese of Morelia
- Juan José Estrada, Mexican professional boxer
- José Dolores Estrada Morales, Nicaraguan politician, Acting President of Nicaragua
- Juan José Estrada Morales, Nicaraguan member of armed services to the rank of general, revolutionary and politician, Provisional President of Nicaragua
- Juan José Flores y Aramburu, Venezuelan military general, later opposed to Spain's rule, a member of Simón Bolívar's Patriot army, Supreme Chief of Ecuador after Spain's expulsion, 1st President of the new Republic of Ecuador
- Juan José de Amézaga Landaroso, Uruguayan lawyer, university professor and politician, 28th President of Uruguay
- Juan José Martí, Spanish novelist
- Juan José Padilla, Spanish matador, after wearing an eyepatch following injuries nicknamed El Pirata (The Pirate)
- Juan José Torres, Spanish athlete and Olympics competitor
- Juan José Torres González, popularly known as "J.J." (Jota-Jota), Bolivian military leader to the rank of commander-in-chief and politician, 61st President of Bolivia
- Juan José Viamonte González, Argentine soldier and head of state, 12th and 15th Governor of Buenos Aires Province
- Justo José de Urquiza y García, Argentine general and politician, Governor of Entre Ríos Province, Provisional Director of the Argentine Confederation, President of the Argentine Confederation
- Leopoldo José Brenes Solórzano, Nicaraguan Catholic bishop and cardinal, Auxiliary bishop of Managua, Bishop of Matagalpa, then Archbishop of Managua, made a Cardinal by Pope Francis in 2014
- Lijo Jose Pellissery, Indian award-winning film director
- Luciano José Cabral Duarte, Brazilian Catholic bishop, founder of the Federal University of Sergipe, Auxiliary bishop then Archbishop of Aracajú
- Luis José de Orbegoso y Moncada-Galindo, de Burutarán y Morales, Peruvian noble titled 5th Count de Olmos, soldier to the rank of brigadier general and politician, 5th President of Peru, 1st President of North Peru
- Luis José Sartorius y Tapia, Spanish noble titled 1st Count of San Luis, journalist, politician and statesman, served as Prime Minister under Queen Isabella II
- Mariano José de Larra, Spanish Romantic writer and journalist
- Marie José of Belgium, wife of the last monarch Umberto II of Italy, Queen-consort for 20 days and jokingly nicknamed "the May Queen"
- Miguel José de Azanza Alegría, Spanish noble titled Duke of Santa Fe, politician and diplomat and viceroy of New Spain
- Marie-José Nat, French actress
- Marie-José Pérec, French athlete and triple Olympic champion
- Marie-Josée Croze, Canadian Actor
- Marie-Josée Saint-Pierre, French Canadian documentary filmmaker
- Manuel José Macário do Nascimento Clemente, Portuguese Catholic bishop and cardinal, Auxiliary bishop of Lisbon, Bishop of Porto, and Patriarch of Lisbon under the name Dom Manuel III, made a Cardinal by Pope Francis in 2015
- Miguel José Asurmendi Aramendía, Spanish Catholic bishop, Bishop of Tarazona, then Bishop of Vitoria
- Moacyr José Vitti, Brazilian Catholic bishop, Auxiliary bishop of Curitiba, then Bishop of Piracicaba
- Miguel José Yacamán, Mexican physicist, major contributor to the development of nanotechnology
- Pedro José Calderón, Peruvian lawyer, diplomat and politician, 8th Prime Minister of Peru
- Pedro José Domingo de Guerra, Bolivian statesman, jurist and diplomat, 24th President of Bolivia
- Pedro José de Fonte y Hernández Miravete, Spanish-born Mexican Catholic bishop, Archbishop of Mexico, crowned the first Emperor of Mexico, Agustín de Iturbide, and the Empress Ana María de Huarte y Muñiz
- Sebastião José de Carvalho e Melo, 1st Marquis of Pombal, Portuguese statesman
- Pedro José Rada y Gamio, Peruvian politician, Mayor of Lima, 74th Prime Minister of Peru
- Ramón José de Arce y Rebollar, Spanish Catholic bishop, Archbishop of Burgos, Grand Inquisitor of the Spanish Inquisition, Archbishop of Zaragoza, Patriarch of the West Indies, was understood as being pro-French when Spain was invaded by the First French Empire and exiled to Paris when Spain gained independence during the Peninsular War
- Remídio José Bohn, Brazilian Catholic bishop, Auxiliary bishop of Porto Alegre, then Bishop of Cachoeira do Sul
- Ricardo José Weberberger, Austrian-born Brazilian Benedictine monk (O.S.B.) and Catholic bishop, Bishop of Barreiras
- Urbano José Allgayer, Brazilian Catholic bishop, Auxiliary bishop of Porto Alegre, then Bishop of Passo Fundo (now known as the Archdiocese of Passo Fundo

=== Surname ===
- Daniel José (born 1988), Brazilian politician
- Edward José (1865–1930), Belgian film director and actor
- Francisco Sionil José (1924–2022), Filipino novelist
- Jorge V. José, Mexican physicist
- Mohan Jose, Indian actor in Malayalam films
- Nicholas Jose, British-born Australian novelist
- Richard Jose (1862–1941), British-born American singer

== See also ==
- Jose
- José Antonio
- José Carlos
- José María
- Josefa (given name)
- Joséphine (given name) including Josephine and Josefine
- Josetxu (given name)
- San José (disambiguation)
- São José (disambiguation)
