= Josele =

Josele is a Spanish given name, a hypocorism of José. Notable people with the name include:

- Josele Ballester (born 2003), Spanish professional golfer
- Josele Garza (born 1962), Mexican race car driver
- Niño Josele (born 1974), Spanish guitarist
