= Josetxu (given name) =

Josetxu is a Basque form of given name José (Joseph). A similar form is Josetxo. Notable people with the name include:

- Josetxo (born 1977), Spanish footballer
- Josetxu Obregón (born 1979), Spanish cellist

== See also ==
- Josetxo Grieta, Spanish rock band
