= José Franco =

José Franco may refer to:

- José Franco (artist) (1920–2009), Portuguese potter and sculptor
- José Franco (poet) (1931–2022), Panama poet and diplomat
- José Franco (baseball) (born 2000), Venezuelan baseball pitcher
- José Antonio Franco (footballer, born 1979), Paraguayan footballer
- José Antonio Franco (footballer, born 1998), Spanish footballer
- José Eduardo Franco (born 1969), Portuguese historian, journalist, poet and essayist
- José Ignacio Franco (born 1981), Spanish footballer Rápido de Bouzas
- José Manuel Franco (born 1957), Spanish politician
- José María Franco (born 1978), Uruguayan footballer for Emelec
- José María Franco (composer) (1894–1971), Basque composer
- José Franco (footballer, born 2001), Guatemalan footballer
