= Salvador Flores Huerta =

Mexican Roman Catholic bishop (1934–2018)

- Bishop of Ciudad Lázaro Cárdenas
- Church: Catholic Church
- Diocese: Diocese of Ciudad Lázaro Cárdenas
- In office: 3 May 1993 – 30 September 2006
- Predecessor: José de Jesús Sahagún de la Parra
- Successor: Fabio Martínez Castilla

Orders
- Ordination: 1 March 1958
- Consecration: 24 June 1993 by Girolamo Prigione

Personal details
- Born: 17 February 1934 Coeneo de la Libertad, Michoacán, Mexico
- Died: 14 December 2018 (aged 84) Ario de Rosales (in Ario Municipality), Michoacán, Mexico

Salvador Flores Huerta (17 February 1934 – 14 December 2018) was a Mexican Roman Catholic bishop.

Flores Huerta was born in Mexico and was ordained to the priesthood in 1958. He served as bishop of the Roman Catholic Diocese of Ciudad Lázaro Cárdenas, Mexico, from 1993 to 2006.
