= Diocese of Tula =

Roman Catholic diocese in Mexico

Diocese of Tula Dioecesis Tullanensis Diócesis de Tula
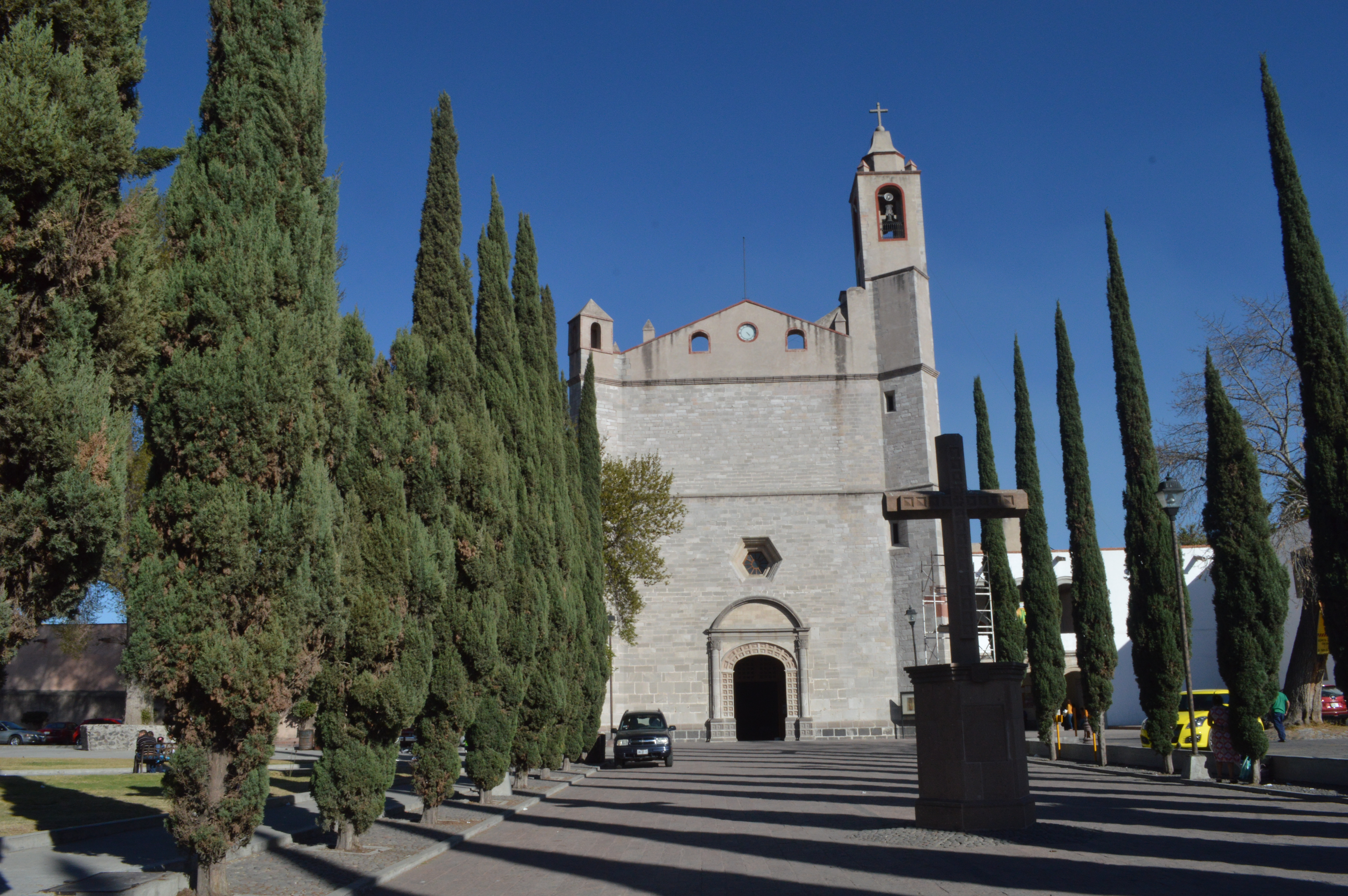
- Catedral de San José

Location
- Country: Mexico
- Ecclesiastical province: Province of Tulancingo
- Metropolitan: Tula de Allende

Statistics
- Area: 3,201 sq mi (8,290 km^{2})
- Population: Total; Catholics: (as of 2010); 1,287,000; 1,025,000 (79.6%)
- Parishes: 45

Information
- Denomination: Roman Catholic
- Rite: Roman Rite
- Established: 27 February 1961 (65 years ago)
- Cathedral: Cathedral of St. Joseph

Current leadership
- Pope: Leo XIV
- Bishop: Juan Pedro Juárez Meléndez
- Metropolitan Archbishop: Domingo Díaz Martínez

Map

The Roman Catholic Diocese of Tula (Latin: Dioecesis Tullanensis) (erected 27 February 1961) is a suffragan diocese of the Archdiocese of Tulancingo. It was a suffragan of the Archdiocese of México until 25 November 2006.

== Bishops ==
=== Ordinaries ===
- José de Jesús Sahagún de la Parra (1961 - 1985), appointed Bishop of Ciudad Lázaro Cárdenas, Michoacán
- José Trinidad Medel Pérez (1986 - 1993), appointed Archbishop of Durango
- Octavio Villegas Aguilar (1994 - 2005), appointed Auxiliary Bishop of Morelia, Michoacán
- Juan Pedro Juárez Meléndez (2006 - )

=== Other priest of this diocese who became bishop ===
- José Antonio Fernández Hurtado, appointed Bishop of Tuxtepec, Oaxaca in 2005

== Episcopal See ==
- Tula, Hidalgo

== External links and references ==
- "Diocese of Tula". Catholic-Hierarchy.
