= Fabio Martínez Castilla =

Mexican Roman Catholic bishop (1950–2023)

His Excellency Fabio Martínez Castilla
- Archbishop of Tuxtla Gutiérrez
- Appointed: 19 February 2013
- Term ended: 25 November 2023
- Predecessor: Rogelio Cabrera López
- Successor: Vacant
- Previous post: Bishop of Ciudad Lázaro Cárdenas (2007–2013)

Orders
- Ordination: 31 January 1977
- Consecration: 4 May 2007 by Emilio Carlos Berlie Belaunzarán

Personal details
- Born: 20 July 1950 Isla Mujeres, Quintana Roo, Mexico
- Died: 25 November 2023 (aged 73) Tuxtla Gutiérrez, Chiapas, Mexico
- Motto: SEMPER SERVUS
- Coat of arms

Styles of Fabio Martínez Castilla
- Reference style: His Excellency; The Most Reverend
- Spoken style: Your Excellency
- Religious style: Archbishop

Fabio Martínez Castilla (20 July 1950 – 25 November 2023) was a Mexican Roman Catholic prelate. He was bishop of Ciudad Lázaro Cárdenas from 2007 to 2013 and archbishop of Tuxtla from 2013 until his death. He died due to ischemic crisis and neoplasm in Tuxtla Gutiérrez, Chiapas, on 25 November 2023, at the age of 73.

Catholic Church titles
Preceded by Rogelio Cabrera López	Archbishop of Tuxtla Gutiérrez; 2013–2023	Succeeded by Vacant
Preceded by Salvador Flores Huerta	Bishop of Ciudad Lázaro Cárdenas; 2007–2013	Succeeded by Armando António Ortíz Aguirre
