= José Pizarro =

Spanish chef, restaurateur and writer

José Pizarro is a Spanish chef, restaurateur and writer. He runs José Pizarro Group, which has six restaurants in the UK and one in Abu Dhabi. He has published six cookbooks. He was the Head Chef at the Michelin-starred restaurant El Mesón de Doña Filo.

== Early life ==
Originally from the village of Talaván in Cáceres, Extremadura, Pizarro grew up in a family of farmers.

He trained as a dental technician and took a cookery course. While waiting for his first position to begin, Pizarro was offered work in a rotisserie kitchen in Cáceres.

== Career ==
José Pizarro spent his early years training in restaurants in Spain before becoming Head Chef at Michelin-starred restaurant El Mesón de Doña Filo. In 1998, he decided to move to London despite not speaking any English and spent time working at restaurants including Eyre Brothers, Brindisa and Gaudi.

In 2011, Pizarro opened his first solo venture, José Tapas Bar on Bermondsey Street, inspired by the tapas bars of Barcelona. In the same year, he opened his next venture, Pizarro Restaurant, also on Bermondsey Street. The restaurant went on to receive several accolades including Best Mediterranean Establishment at The Food Awards London, The Rosette Awards for Culinary Excellence, Food and Travel Magazine's Best Newcomer of the Year and Best Restaurant of the Year.

Pizarro opened two further venues in London: José Pizarro at Broadgate Circle and pop-up restaurant Little José in Canary Wharf (now closed). His next venture was The Swan Inn in Esher, which he took over from fellow chef Claude Bosi in 2019.

In August 2021, Pizarro opened two restaurants at the Royal Academy of Arts. The two locations were created in collaboration with the Royal Academy of Arts and its partner, Company of Cooks.

Pizarro opened Iris Zahara, a guest house in Zahara de Los Atunes, Andalusia, in 2022.

In March 2023, Pizarro opened José by Pizarro, a restaurant inside the Conrad Hilton in Abu Dhabi. This was his first restaurant opening outside the UK.

=== Television and other media ===
A regular on the BBC's Saturday Kitchen, Pizarro has also appeared on Sunday Brunch, Weekend Kitchen with Waitrose, This Morning, Rick Stein's Christmas, Food Network's The Big Eat and James Martin's Saturday Morning.

=== Awards ===
- Chef of the Year – Food & Travel Magazine's Reader Awards 2021
- Newcomer of the Year Winner 2012 – Food & Travel Magazine's Reader Awards 2012
- Restaurant of the Year Winner 2012 – Food & Travel Magazine's Reader Awards 2012
- Extremeño de Hoy 2014
- 100 Españoles 2014
- Pizarro voted in at No. 35 in the Restaurant Magazine Awards 2015
- Number 39 in Harpers' Hot 100 2017
- Best Cookbook (Basque) at the Food & Travel Magazine's Reader Awards 2017
- Taste of London 2017 Best in Taste runner-up
- Galardón Turístico Gruta de Aracena 2016
- Restaurant of the Year (Pizarro) at the World Food Awards 2012

== Published works ==
- Pizarro, José (2009). Seasonal Spanish Food. London: Kyle Books. ISBN 9780857830845
- Pizarro, José (2012). José Pizarro's Spanish Flavours. London: Kyle Books. ISBN 9780857834560
- Pizarro, José (2016). Basque. London: Hardie Grant. ISBN 9781784883683
- Pizarro, José (2017). Catalonia. London: Hardie Grant. ISBN 9781784881160
- Pizarro, José (2019). Recipes from Andalusia. London: Hardie Grant. ISBN 9781784886325
- Pizarro, José (2022). The Spanish Home Kitchen. London: Hardie Grant. ISBN 9781784884475

== Personal life ==
José lives in London and Spain with his partner Dr Peter Meades and their two dogs, Conchi and Pie.
