= José Neves =

Portuguese entrepreneur (born 1974)

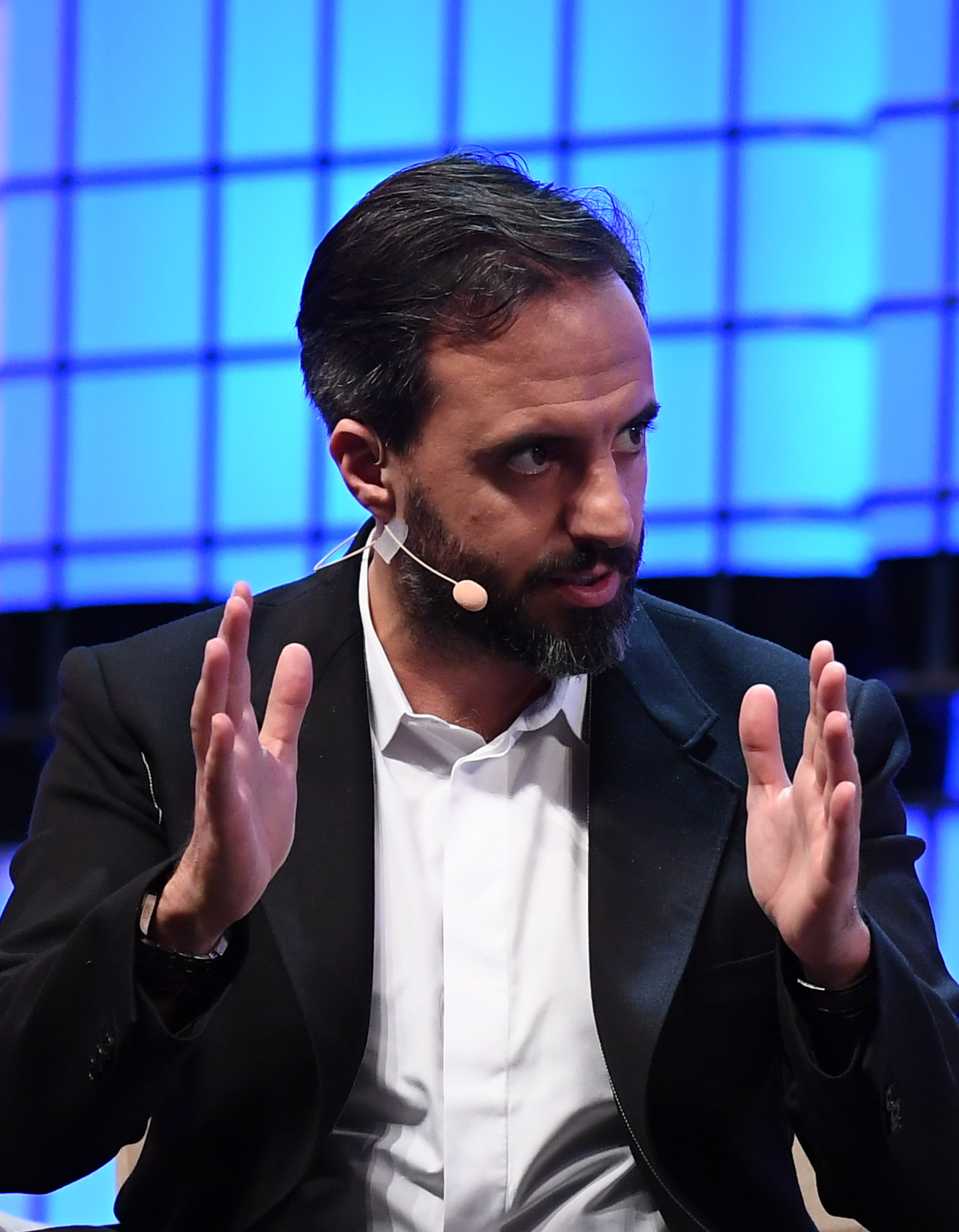
- Neves in 2017
- Born: 26 June 1974 (age 51)
- Education: University of Porto
- Occupation: Businessman
- Known for: Founder of Farfetch
- Spouse: Married
- Children: 5

José Manuel Ferreira Neves (born 26 June 1974) is a Portuguese entrepreneur and the founder of Farfetch, a global luxury fashion online platform.

== Early life ==
José Neves was born on 26 June 1974. He grew up in Porto, Portugal, where his grandfather owned a shoe factory. He studied economics at the University of Porto.

== Career ==
Neves founded his first tech company, Grey Matter, while studying at university. The company provided software for clothing manufacturers.

In the same year, he founded a software firm called Platforme for small fashion brands in 1996. In 1996, at the age of 22, he launched a footwear brand named Swear, and opened a store in London. The brand sold to other shops. He started a retail fashion store named bstore on Savile Row in London in 2001.

In 2008, Neves founded Farfetch. In June 2017, Farfetch sold a minority stake to JD.com, for US$397 million, prior to launching in China.

In September 2018, following the IPO of Farfetch on the New York Stock Exchange, Neves' stake in the company was valued at US$1.4 billion.

By 2022, Farfetch began facing operational and financial challenges, including declining margins, slower-than-expected growth, and missed earnings targets. Investor confidence waned further when the company abruptly cancelled its Q3 2023 earnings release.

In January 2024, Farfetch entered a pre-pack administration process and was acquired by South Korean e-commerce giant Coupang for $500 million. The deal, structured as a rescue financing agreement, wiped out existing shareholders. Neves stepped down as CEO following the sale.

The acquisition drew significant criticism from institutional investors, including the "2027 Ad Hoc Group", who alleged the sale deterred competing bids through restrictive pre-deal clauses. Multiple lawsuits were subsequently filed in the US and UK alleging shareholder fraud, mismanagement, and failure of governance by Neves and other board members.

== Personal life ==
Neves is married and has five children, previously lived in Guimarães, Portugal. and Clerkenwell, London. However Neves has since relocated to Brazil. In legal proceedings before the High Court of England and Wales, his legal team argued that he is no longer under UK jurisdiction due to his current residence in Brazil.
