= José Joaquim dos Santos =

Portuguese composer

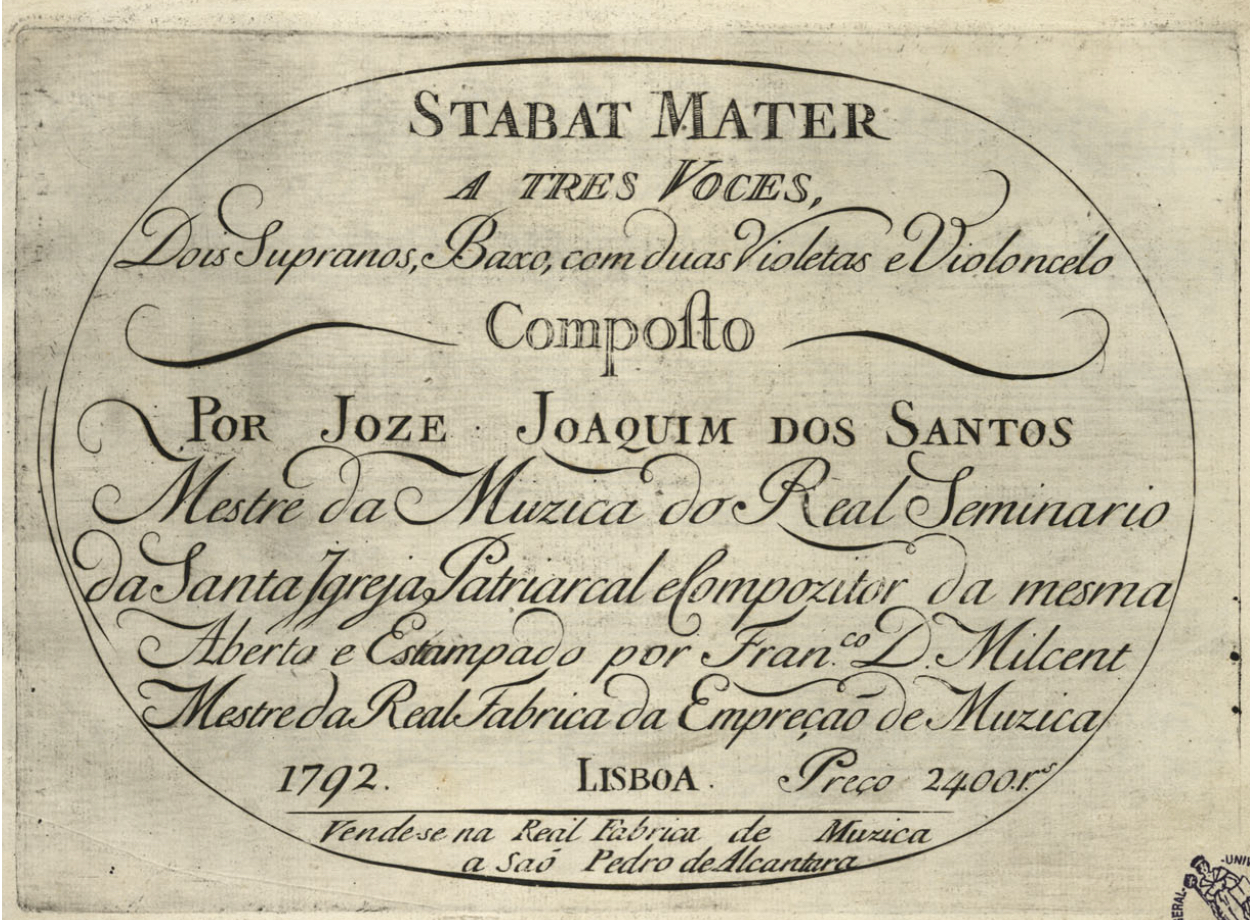
Stabat Mater by José Joaquim dos Santos, cover page. Published by the Real Fábrica da Musica, Lisbon, 1792. Collection of the Library of the Ajuda National Palace, Lisbon.

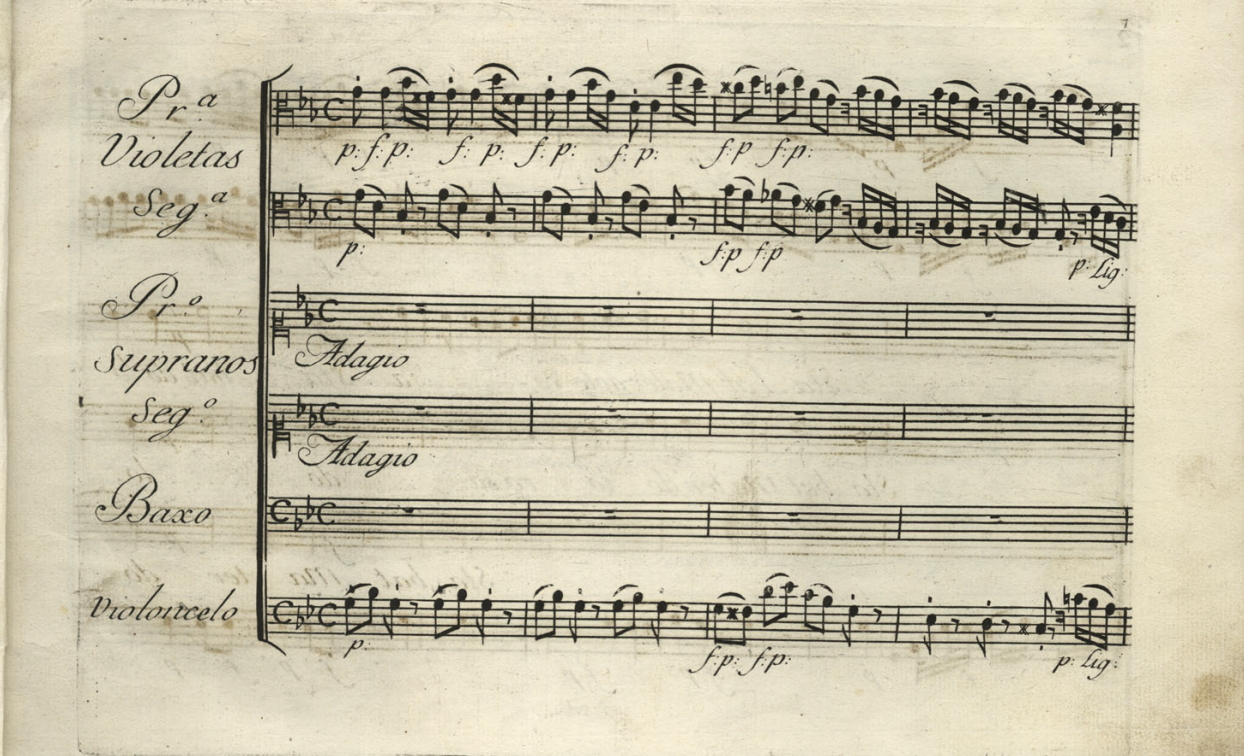
Stabat Mater by José Joaquim dos Santos, first page. Published by the Real Fábrica da Musica, Lisbon, 1792. Collection of the Library of the Ajuda National Palace, Lisbon.

José Joaquim dos Santos (? 1747–1801) was a Portuguese music teacher and late Baroque-period composer who specialised in writing sacred music. He was listed by two authors as being among Portugal's "most outstanding eighteenth-century composers."

He was born in Senhor da Pedra near Óbidos to Manuel Gonçalves dos Santos and Vitória Luísa and entered Lisbon's Royal Patriarchal Music Seminary (Real Seminário de Música da Patriarcal de Lisboa) on 24 June 1754.

After graduating on 1 January 1763, Santos accepted an offer to remain on staff to teach solfège and was later appointed as professor (mestre) of harmony, counterpoint and composition. He continued teaching there for the remainder of his life. From 1768, parallel to his work within the seminary, he was also engaged as a singer, organist, composer and conductor at the Royal Chapel (Capela Real).

Of his teaching skills, one of his students, André da Silva Gomes described Santos as "wise and experienced" then adding that his command of fugue writing was "outstanding … and singular", while Nancy Lee Harper in her survey of Portuguese keyboard music said he was "noted for his Figured Bass rules of accompaniment."

According to musicologist Robert Stevenson, Santos' own composition style was strongly influenced by Neapolitan opera composer Davide Perez who taught him at the seminary, and commenting about Santos' overall approach, Enrico Ruggieri says in his thesis, "He was renowned as master of the stile antico, however he composed music in stile concertato as well." Looking specifically at Santos' 1792 setting of the Stabat Mater, Ruggieri noted that "the composition is built around the formal structure of a cantata sacra da camera that belongs to the style of the Neapolitan tradition of composers such as Alessandro Scarlatti or Giovanni Battista Pergolesi." What has been described by musicologist Ricardo Bernardes as "the well-known process of Italianization of musical practices begun in the reign of King João V" is clearly demonstrated here.

Apart from two secular eclogues which were performed respectively in 1786 and 1787 at the Lisbon Academy of Sciences (Academia das Ciências de Lisboa) for its celebrations of the Feast of the Immaculate Conception, the remainder of Santos' known works were written for liturgical use and performed in Portugal and Brazil. These include 5 settings of the Mass, 2 of the Te Deum, a Credo, a complete Vespers, 25 individual Psalms, 21 Anthems, Motets and Antiphons, 4 of the Miserere, 1 of Holy Week Matins and 1 of the Holy Week Responsories. The vocal forces vary from 4 to 8 voices plus soloists in some works, and always with accompaniment by organ, orchestra, organ and orchestra, or various smaller combinations of solo instruments.

The exact date and cause of Santos' death and the place of his burial are unknown.

== Bibliography ==
- Alvarenga, João Pedro (1997), "Música Sacra no tempo de D. Maria I: Obras de João de Sousa Carvalho e José Joaquim dos Santos". XVIII Jornadas Gulbenkian de Música Antiga, pp. 50–56, Lisboa, Fundação Calouste Gulbenkian.
- Filipe, Pedro dos Santos (2003), Nocturnos: Responsoria In Sabbato Sancto de José Joaquim dos Santos, Câmara Municipal de Óbidos.
- Cardoso, André. Introdução: José Joaquim dos Santos (1747–1801) e o Hino para as Laudes do Nascimento de Nosso Senhor Jesus Cristo. Accessed 28 July 2018.
- Ruggieri, Enrico. The Lamentações para a Semana Santa by José Joaquim dos Santos and Luciano Xavier dos Santos and the music for two violas, voices concertate and low instruments. Master Research Projects, 2017. KC Research Portal. Accessed 30 July 2018.
- Stevenson, Robert. "Santos, José Joaquim dos." The Grove Dictionary of Music and Musicians, edited by Stanley Sadie. Macmillan Publishing, 1980. Vol. 16, p. 485. ISBN 0-333-23111-2.
- Vasconcelos, Joaquim (1870), "Santos, José Joaquim dos". Os Músicos Portuguezes: Biographia, Bibliographia, Vol. 2, pp. 158–159, Porto, Imprensa Portugueza.
- Vieira, Ernesto (1900), "Santos (José Joaquim dos)", Diccionario Biographico de Músicos Portuguezes, Vol. II, pp. 274–276, Lisboa, Typographia Mattos Moreira & Pinho. Santos (José Joaquim dos). Accessed 12 November 2018. (A list of his works held in archives is included in this entry.)

== Selective discography ==
- Brasilessentia Grupo Vocal; Orquestra de Câmara da UNESP; Vítor Gabriel, conductor – Música na Catedral de São Paulo. Paulus – CD 004383. Released: 1999.
- Ensemble Joanna Musica – Music for Saint Joana, Princess of Aveiro. Numérica – NUM 1183. Released: 2009.
- Segréis de Lisboa – Stabat Mater Miserere: Tributo a José Joaquim dos Santos. Movieplay – MOV 3-11051. Released: 1997.
