= José de Jesús Sahagún de la Parra =

Mexican prelate (born 1922)

- Bishop Emeritus of Ciudad Lázaro Cárdenas
- Church: Roman Catholic Church
- See: Ciudad Lázaro Cárdenas
- In office: 1985–1993
- Predecessor: None
- Successor: Salvador Flores Huerta
- Previous post: Bishop of Tula (1961–1985)

Orders
- Ordination: 26 May 1946
- Consecration: 8 September 1961 by Luigi Raimondi

Personal details
- Born: José de Jesús Sahagún de la Parra; 1 January 1922 (age 104) Cotija, Mexico

José de Jesús Sahagún de la Parra (born 1 January 1922) is a Mexican Catholic prelate who served as Bishop of Ciudad Lázaro Cárdenas from 1985 until his retirement in 1993.

== Life ==
Parra was born in Cotija, Mexico, and was ordained a priest on May 26, 1946. Parra was appointed Bishop of Tula in 1961. He attended sessions one, two and four of the Second Vatican Council. Parra's last appointment was to the Diocese of Ciudad Lázaro Cárdenas on September 11, 1985. He retired on May 3, 1993 and turned 100 in January 2022. He is the oldest living Catholic bishop and the last living bishop appointed by Pope John XXIII.

== See also ==
- Diocese of Ciudad Lázaro Cárdenas
- Diocese of Tula
