= José Carabaño =

Venezuelan music executive (born 1993)

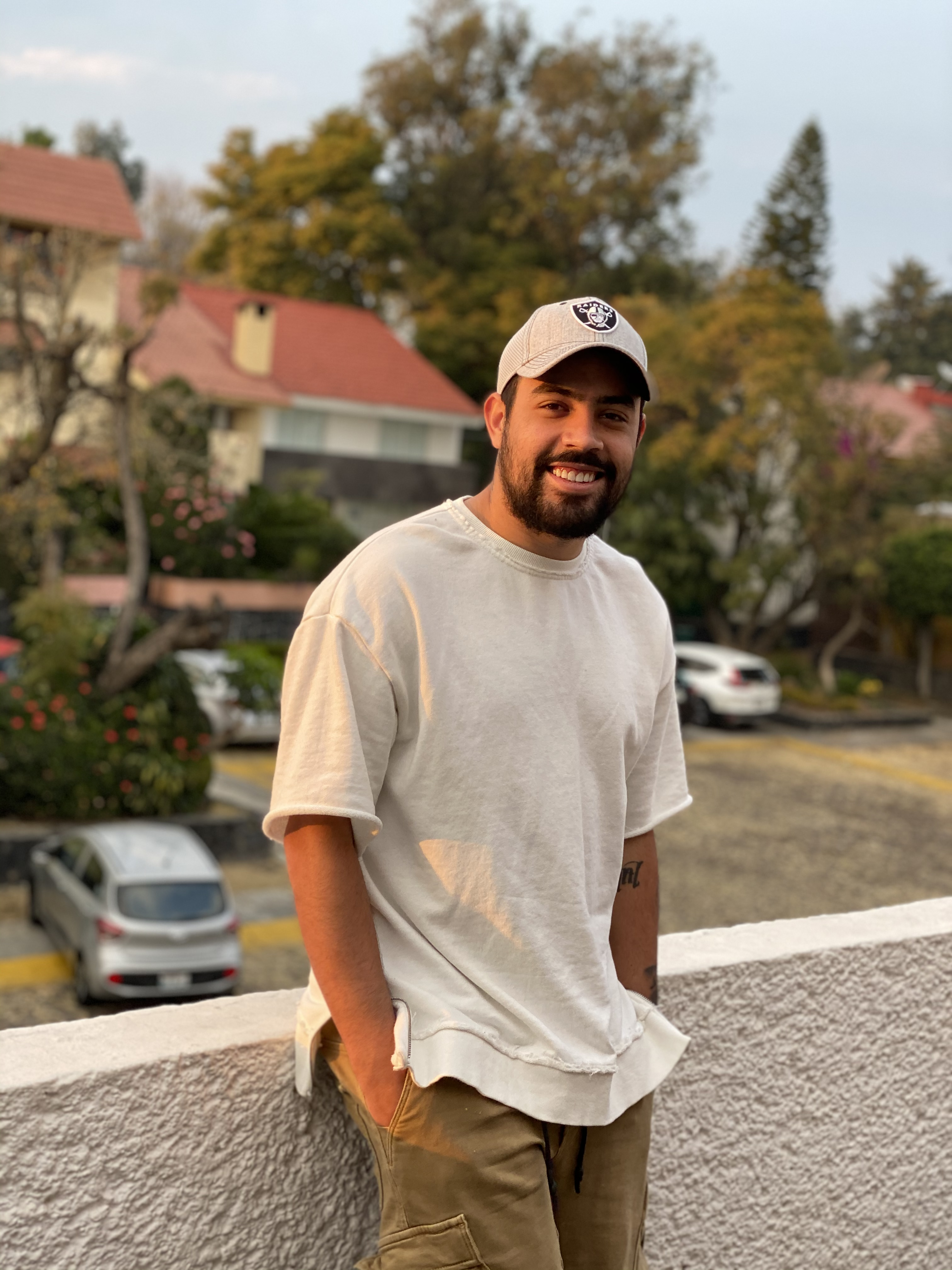
- Carabaño in 2019
- Born: 20 November 1993 (age 32); Caracas, Venezuela
- Other names: Junior
- Occupations: Music executive, talent manager, graphic designer

José Carabaño (Caracas, Venezuela, 20 November 1993), known professionally as Junior, is a Venezuelan music executive, talent manager and graphic designer. He is the co-founder and vice president of Rimas Entertainment.

In 2018, Junior was included in the list of the most important figures in independent music according to the Billboard.

== Biography ==
He started out doing graffiti on the streets of Barquisimeto, Venezuela. In 2011 he developed the entire graphic concept for De La Ghetto. This allowed him to enter the Latin urban music industry and he ended up expanding to work with other artists such as Ozuna and Daddy Yankee.

In 2017, he was in charge of the design and development of Ozuna's first album titled Odisea. As part of the promotional strategy, he and his team developed the mobile video game Odisea The Game, which reached more than 100,000 downloads in digital stores.

In 2018, he was listed by Billboard as Amplificador Digital on the list of the 48 Jobs of Tomorrow in the Latin music industry.

In 2019, he was in charge of the work plan for Kevin Roldán, an artist he represented together with Universal Music, with whom he released his first studio album, which has more than 2 billion plays.

In 2024, he was the one who headed the signing of the Latin Mafia to his record company. Latin Mafia was nominated in the Best New Artist category at the 25th Annual Latin Grammy Awards.

In 2024, he was included in the Billboard Latin Power Players list, a list that recognizes the most influential executives in the world of Latin music.
