= José Augusto Ferreira Veiga =

Portuguese composer (1838–1903)

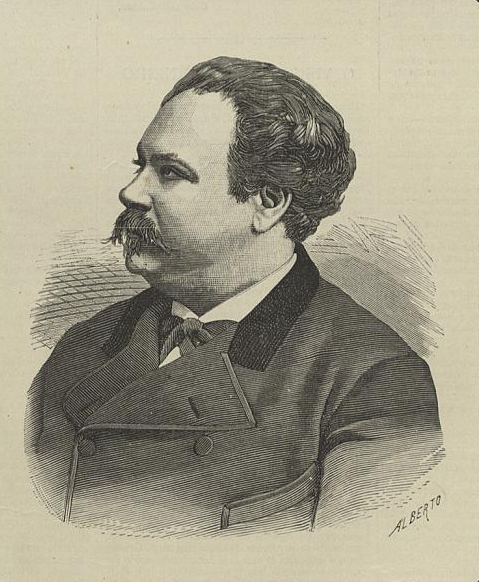
José Augusto Ferreira Veiga in O Occidente (1885)

José Augusto Ferreira Veiga, Viscount of Arneiro (22 November 1838 in Portuguese Macau – 7 June 1903 in San Remo, Italy) was a Portuguese composer, studying music with Joaquim Botelho, Schira, and António José Soares in Lisbon.

Veiga performed at the Teatro Nacional de São Carlos on 31 March 1876; his opera-ballet L'elisir di giovinezza (Jean-Jacques Magne) was not popular with the public, which led Veiga to present it the following year in Milan, Italy, at the Teatro Dal Verme. This presentation in 1877 also failed to win public favour. He then adapted the music to a new libretto by Rudolfo Paravicini that was based on an English novel by Ann Radcliffe. The new version, now a melodrama tragico named Dina la derelitta, was finally accepted by audiences upon being performed at the Teatro Nacional de São Carlos on 14 March 1885.

Veiga wrote the opera Don Bibas, based on Alexandre Herculano's previously unknown novel O Bobo (The Jester) but it has never been performed.

José Augusto Ferreira Veiga died on 7 June 1903 in San Remo, Italy, aged 64.

== Works ==
- A questão do oriente (operetta, Coimbra, Teatro Académico, 1859)
- Pela bocca morre o peixe (J. Guilerme dos Santos Lima/José Inácio de Araújo), (lyrical farce, 1860)
- Ginn (ballet, Lisbon, 1866)
- Te Deum (Lisbon, 1871)
- L'elisir di giovinezza (4, Jean-Jacques Magne) (Opera-ballet, Lisbon, Teatro de S. Carlos, 31 March 1876)
- L'elisir di giovinezza (4, Jean-Jacques Magne) (Opera-ballet, Milan, Teatro Dal Verme (1877)
- Dina la derelitta (Rodolfo Paravicini after Ann Radcliffe) (melodrama tragico, Lisbon, Teatro de S. Carlos, 14 March 1885)
- Don Bibas (never performed)
