= Diocese of Ciudad Lázaro Cárdenas =

Latin Catholic jurisdiction in Mexico

Coordinates: 17.9630°N 102.2081°W

Diocese of Ciudad Lázaro Cárdenas Dioecesis Civitatis Lazari Cárdenas Diócesis de Ciudad Lázaro Cárdenas

Location
- Country: Mexico
- Ecclesiastical province: Morelia

Statistics
- Area: 5,747 sq mi (14,880 km^{2})
- Population: Total; Catholics: (as of 2006); 805,000; 725,000 (90.1%)
- Parishes: 23

Information
- Denomination: Catholic Church
- Sui iuris church: Latin Church
- Rite: Roman Rite
- Established: 11 October 1985 (39 years ago)
- Cathedral: Cathedral of Christ the King

Current leadership
- Pope: Leo XIV
- Bishop: Armando António Ortíz Aguirre
- Metropolitan Archbishop: Carlos Garfias Merlos
- Bishops emeritus: José de Jesús Sahagún de la Parra

Map
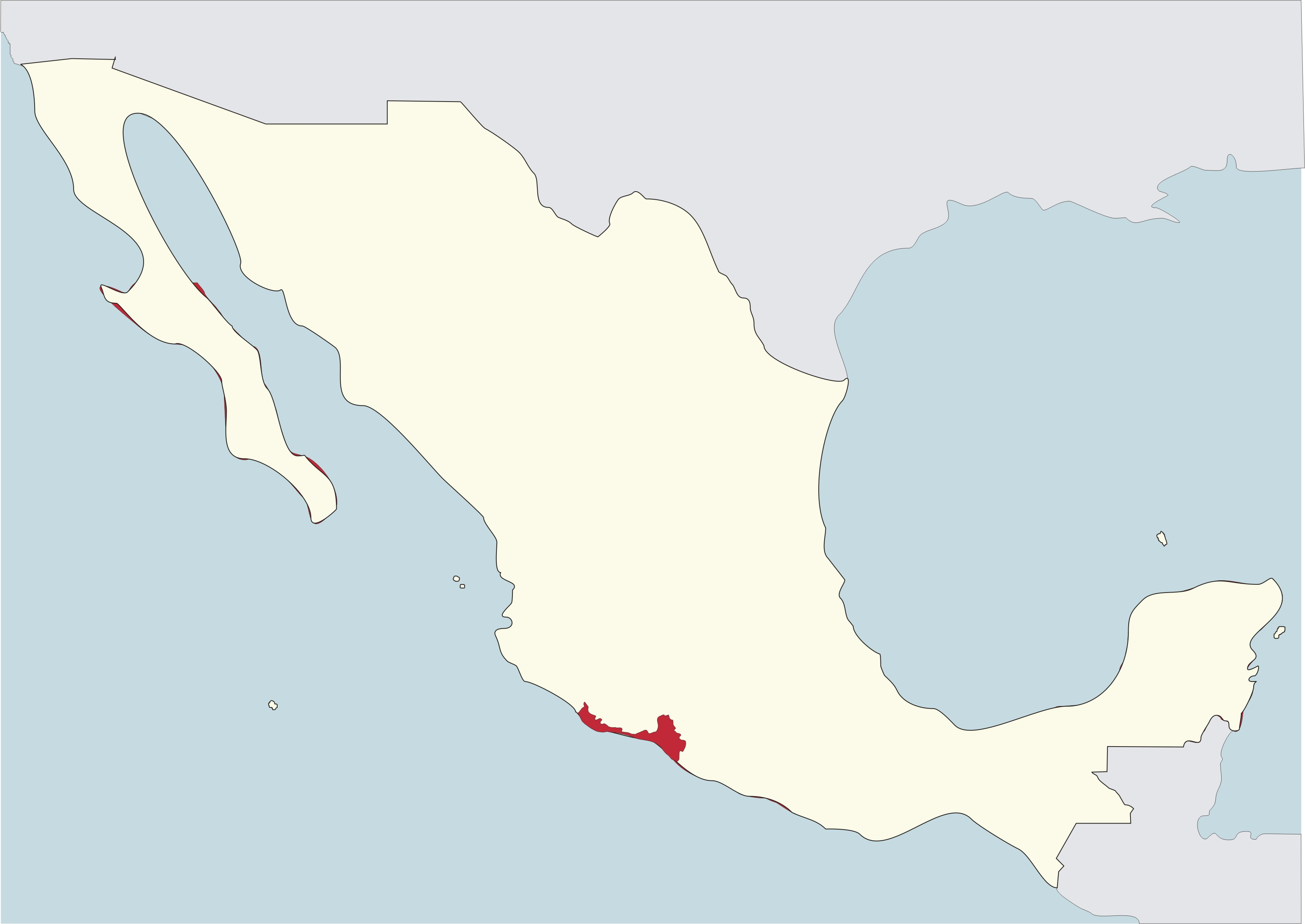

Website
- diocesislazarocardenas.org

The Diocese of Ciudad Lázaro Cárdenas (Latin: Dioecesis Civitatis Lazari Cárdenas) is a Latin Church ecclesiastical territory or diocese of the Catholic Church. It is a suffragan in the ecclesiastical province to the metropolitan Archdiocese of Morelia. Its cathedra is within the Cathedral of Christ the King, in the episcopal see of Lázaro Cárdenas, Michoacán.

== History ==
The Diocese of Ciudad Lázaro Cárdenas was erected on 11 October 1985. It was a suffragan of the Archdiocese of Acapulco until 25 November 2006.

== Ordinaries ==
- José de Jesús Sahagún de la Parra (1985 – 1993)
- Salvador Flores Huerta (1993 – 2006)
- Fabio Martínez Castilla (2007 - 2013), appointed Archbishop of Tuxtla Gutierrez
- Armando António Ortíz Aguirre (2013 - present)

== External links and references ==
- "Diocese of Ciudad Lázaro Cárdenas". Catholic-Hierarchy.
