= José de Lima =

- Bishop of the Diocese of Sete Lagoas Emeritus
- Church: Roman Catholic Church
- See: Roman Catholic Diocese of Sete Lagoas
- In office: 1981 - 1999
- Predecessor: Daniel Tavares Baeta Neves
- Successor: Guilherme Porto
- Previous post(s): Prelate

Orders
- Ordination: December 8, 1948

Personal details
- Born: February 21, 1924; Tiros, Brazil
- Died: June 12, 2013 (aged 89)

José de Lima (February 21, 1924 – June 12, 2013) was a Brazilian prelate of the Catholic Church.

José de Lima was born in Tiros and ordained a priest on December 8, 1948. Lima was appointed bishop of the Diocese of Itumbiarao on April 13, 1973 and was ordained bishop on July 15, 1973. Lima was appointed bishop of the Diocese of Sete Lagoas on July 7, 1981. Lima would retire from the diocese on October 27, 1999.

== See also ==
- Diocese of Sete Lagoas
- Diocese of Itumbiarao
