= José Zúñiga (artist) =

Mexican painter (born 1937)

- Born: 1937 (age 88–89); Oaxaca City, Mexico
- Education: Escuela Nacional de Pintura, Escultura y Grabado "La Esmeralda"
- Known for: Neo-figurative art

José Zúñiga (born 1937) is a Mexican painter whose work has been exhibited both in Mexico and abroad. His work has been recognized by membership in the Salón de la Plástica Mexicana.

== Early life and education ==
Zúñiga was born in the Carmen Alto neighborhood of the Oaxaca City in 1937. In 1943, he moved with his family to Mexico City where he attended middle school, and then studied electronics at a vocational school. However, at age twenty one, he decided to study at the Escuela Nacional de Pintura, Escultura y Grabado "La Esmeralda" because of his interest in drawing. One of his teachers, Benito Messeguer, urged him to devote himself to painting. Shortly after, he began exhibiting his work in Mexico and abroad.

== Career ==
In 1969, he work received two acquisition awards from the national painting competition sponsored by CONCANACO. In 1970, he won first place in painting at the annual competition of the Salón de la Plástica Mexicana, whose technical council he joined in 1971.

From 1972 to 1975, he was in Europe on a grant from the French government to study at the School for Decorative Arts in Paris. While in Europe, he traveled to countries such as Italy, Spain, the United Kingdom, Germany, Greece, Turkey, Yugoslavia and the Netherlands. He also created two murals: one was situated at the Rohner studio in 1973; the other, situated in Sardinia, was called “Homage to Pablo Neruda”. He received a second grant to return to Paris from 1980 to 1982 to write a thesis called 'La pintura mural Mexicana y sus aportes contemporaneous en otros paises', (Mexican mural painting and its contemporary contributions in other countries) related to his interest in urban art.

During his career, he has continued to exhibit individually both in Mexico and abroad, as well as teach at La Esmeralda, where he was director from 1991 to 1993. His works can be found in public and private collections such as those of the Museo de Arte Moderno and the Musée National d'Art Moderne in Paris.

Zúñiga was described as a neo figurative painter; he considered himself primarily a colorist. His painting method involved starting with figurative outlines, but also including abstract elements. His work was generally influenced by pre-Hispanic artwork.
