= José Franco (artist) =

Portuguese artist (1920–2009)

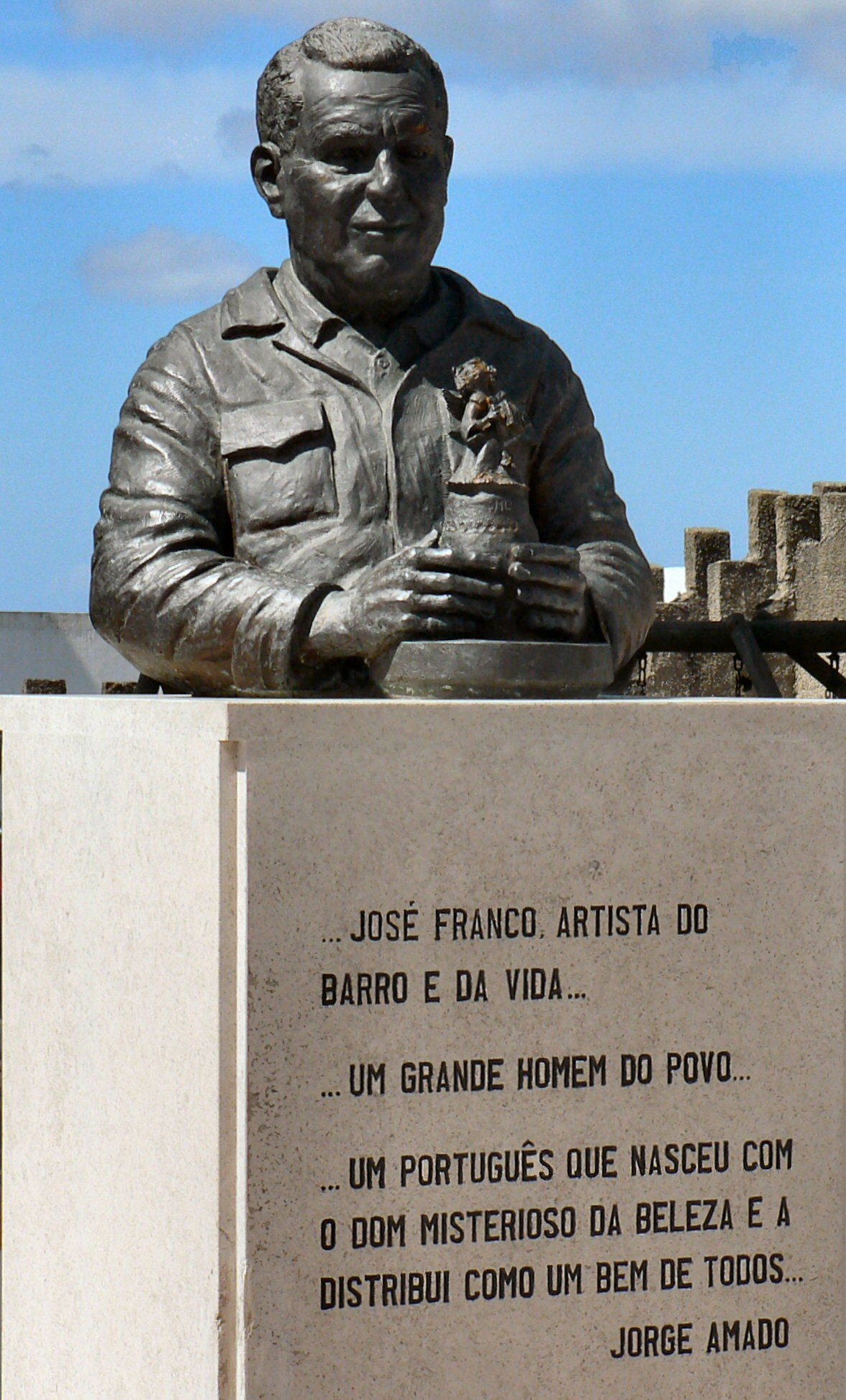
Bust of José Franco by Domingos Soares Branco

José Silos Franco (Sobreiro, Mafra, 19 March 1920 - Lisbon, 14 April 2009) was a Portuguese potter and sculptor.

Franco was born into a humble family of potters and started developing his artistic style from a very young age. He was influenced both by the popular art of pottery and also by more high level clay artists, like Joaquim Machado de Castro. He especially cultivated religious art, making many Nativity Scenes.

The greatest accomplishment of Franco was his "Aldeia Típica de José Franco" ("Typical Village of José Franco"), an open air museum that recreates a model village from the Mafra region as it might have existed during the first decades of the 20th century, in Sobreiro.

Franco's art was admired in Portugal and abroad, by people like actor Raul Solnado and the Brazilian writer Jorge Amado, who owned a collection of his works. One of Franco's Nativity Scenes was offered to Pope John Paul II, who blessed it.

In Franco's last years, he asked the Rotary Club of Mafra to help him create the José Franco Foundation and a School for Arts and Works.
