= Tula de Allende Cathedral =

St. Joseph Cathedral
- Catedral de San José de Tula de Allende
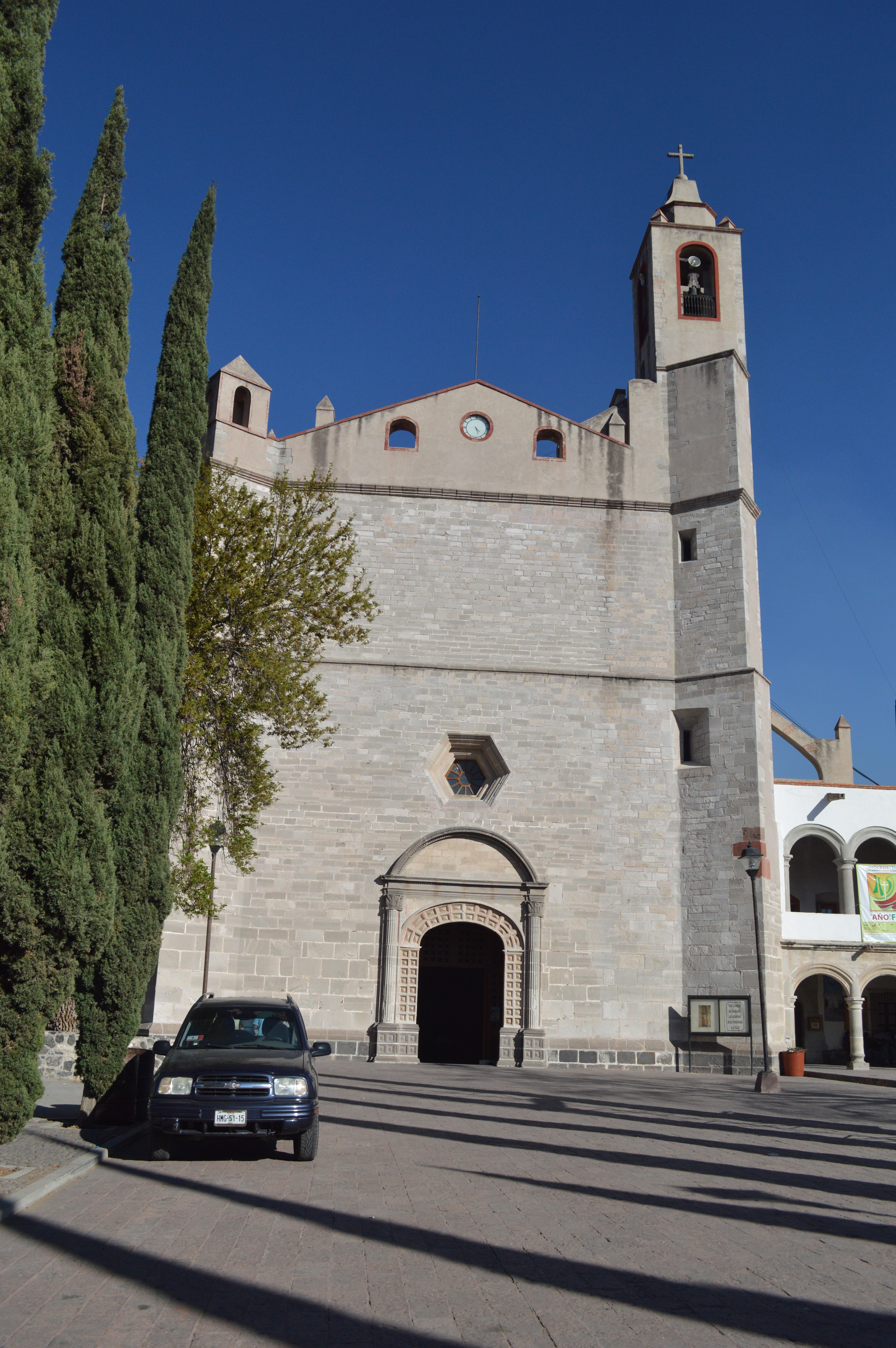
- St. Joseph Cathedral
- 20°03′18″N 99°20′35″W
- Location: Tula de Allende
- Country: Mexico
- Denomination: Roman Catholic Church

The St. Joseph Cathedral (Spanish: Catedral de San José de Tula de Allende) Also Tula de Allende Cathedral It is a Catholic religious building in the city of Tula de Allende in the state of Hidalgo in Mexico

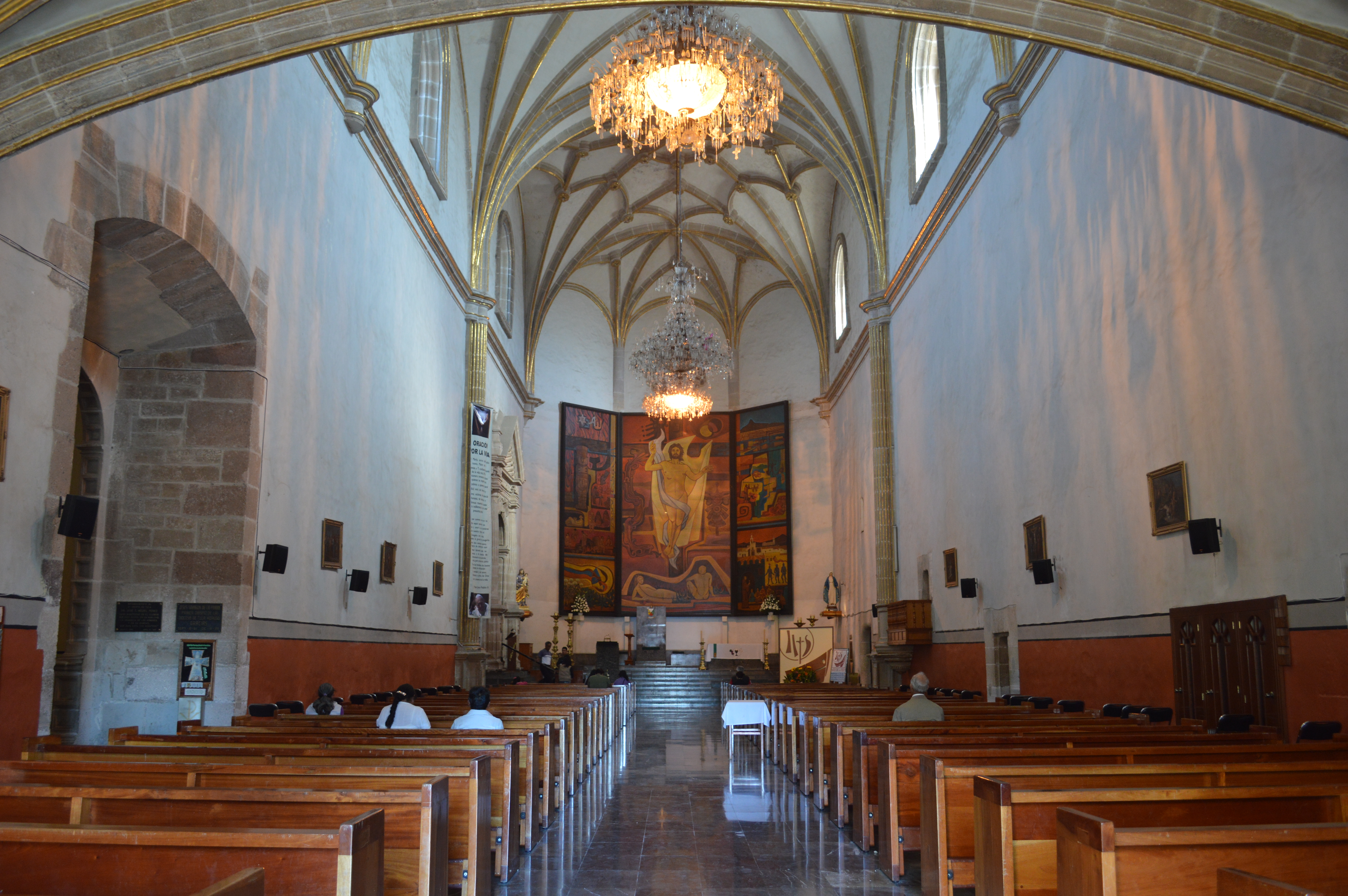
Internal View featuring a Gothic-vaulted nave.

== History ==
Cathedral building was originally a convent raised by the evangelizers of the Franciscan order during the time of the Spanish conquest. Elevated to rank of cathedral and dedicated to the Patriarch St. Joseph, it was one of the first convents raised in Mexico and one of the most representative of that period.

Pope John XXIII on February 27, 1961 decreed the erection of a new diocese in Mexico based in the town of Tula de Allende, and until September 7, 1961, when the Diocese's decree was erected for the Apostolic Delegate of those dates, who gave the title of cathedral to the then Franciscan parish church of Tula.

== See also ==
- Roman Catholicism in Mexico
- St. Joseph's Cathedral
