= Diocese of Sete Lagoas =

Catholic ecclesiastical territory

Diocese of Sete Lagoas Dioecesis Septemlacunensis Diocese de Sete Lagoas
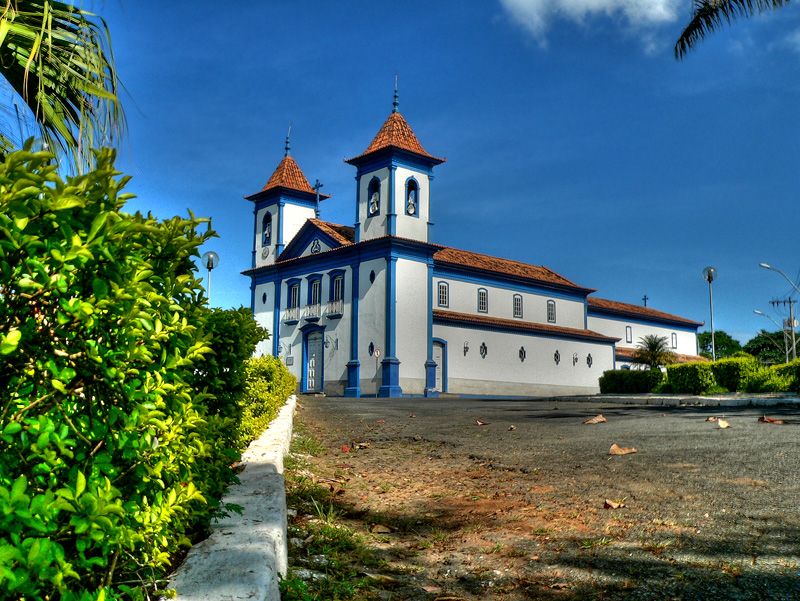
- Cathedral of St. Anthony

Location
- Country: Brazil
- Ecclesiastical province: Belo Horizonte
- Metropolitan: Belo Horizonte

Statistics
- Area: 11,915 km^{2} (4,600 sq mi)
- Population: Total; Catholics: (as of 2010); 454,314; 354,017 (77.9%)

Information
- Rite: Latin Rite
- Established: 16 July 1955 (70 years ago)
- Cathedral: Cathedral of St Anthony in Sete Lagoas

Current leadership
- Pope: Leo XIV
- Bishop: Francisco Cota de Oliveira
- Metropolitan Archbishop: Walmor Oliveira de Azevedo
- Bishops emeritus: Aloísio Jorge Pena Vitral; Guilherme Porto

Website
- www.diocesedesetelagoas.com.br

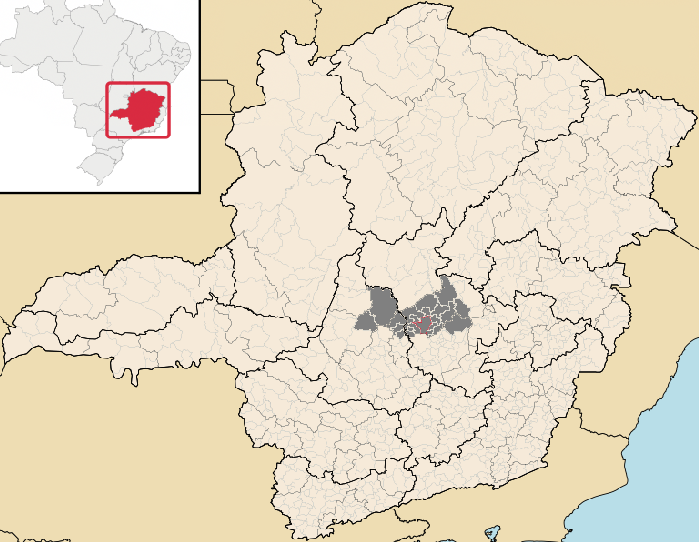
Roman Catholic Diocese of Sete Lagoas.

The Roman Catholic Diocese of Sete Lagoas (Latin: Dioecesis Septemlacunensis) is a diocese located in the city of Sete Lagoas in the ecclesiastical province of Belo Horizonte in Brazil.

== History ==
- July 16, 1955: Established as Diocese of Sete Lagoas from the Metropolitan Archdiocese of Belo Horizonte and Metropolitan Archdiocese of Diamantina

== Leadership ==
- Bishops of Sete Lagoas (Roman rite), in reverse chronological order
  - Bishop Francisco Cota de Oliveira (2020.06.10 -
  - Bishop Aloísio Jorge Pena Vitral (2017.09.20 - 2020.06.10)
  - Bishop Guilherme Porto (1999.10.27 – 2017.09.20)
  - Bishop José de Lima (1981.06.07 – 1999.10.27)
  - Bishop Daniel Tavares Baeta Neves (1964.06.04 – 1980.07.08)
  - Bishop José de Almeida Batista Pereira (1955.11.07 – 1964.04.02)

== Sources ==
- GCatholic.org
- Catholic Hierarchy
