= Talaván =

Talaván, Spain
- municipality
- Flag Coat of arms
- Interactive map of Talaván, Spain
- Coordinates: 39°43′N 6°17′W
- Country: Spain
- Autonomous community: Extremadura
- Province: Cáceres
- Municipality: Talaván

Area
  - Total: 98 km^{2} (38 sq mi)
- Elevation: 367 m (1,204 ft)

Population (2025-01-01)
  - Total: 775
  - Density: 7.9/km^{2} (20/sq mi)
- Time zone: UTC+1 (CET)
  - Summer (DST): UTC+2 (CEST)

Talaván is a municipality located in the province of Cáceres, Extremadura, Spain. According to the 2005 census (INE), the municipality has a population of 928 inhabitants.

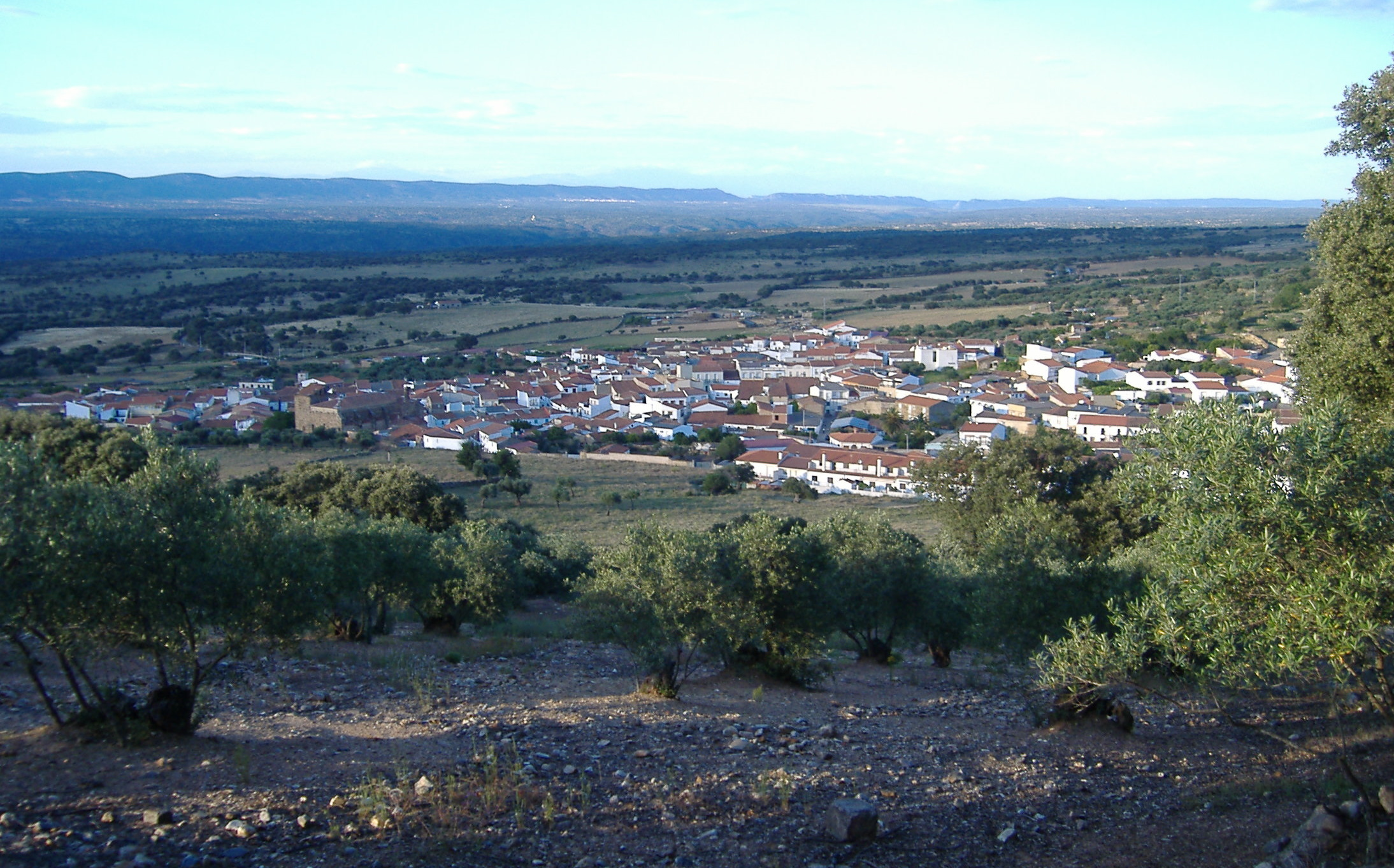
View of Talaván

== See also ==
- List of municipalities in Cáceres
