= Daniel José =

Brazilian politician (born 1988)

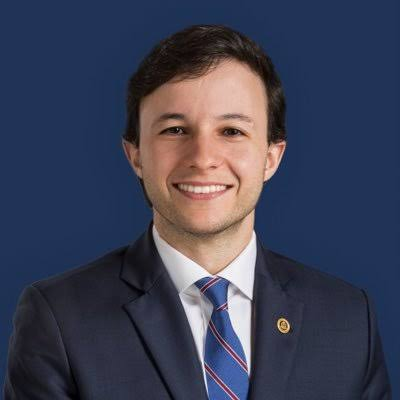
- José in 2019

Member of the Chamber of Deputies
- In office 11 June 2024 – 9 October 2024
- Preceded by: Renata Abreu
- Succeeded by: Renata Abreu
- Constituency: São Paulo

Personal details
- Born: 14 February 1988 (age 38)
- Party: Podemos (since 2022)

Daniel José da Silva Oliveira (born 14 February 1988) is a Brazilian politician. From June to October 2024, he was a member of the Chamber of Deputies. From 2019 to 2023, he was a member of the Legislative Assembly of São Paulo.
