= Ana Maria Moreno Del Castillo =

Panamanian Catholic laywoman

Servant of God Ana Maria Moreno Del Castillo
- Born: 28 May 1887; La Villa de los Santos, Panama
- Died: 11 November 1977

Ana Maria Moreno Del Castillo (28 May 1887 – 11 November 1977) was a Panamanian Catholic laywoman whose beatification process commenced in 2017 in the Diocese of Chitré.

== Life ==
Ana Maria Moreno Del Castillo was born in 1887 in La Villa de los Santos, a small village in Panama. She was the fourth out of eight siblings, and grew up in a religious household. She was educated by the Sisters of Charity of St. Vincent de Paul.

She was a catechist for hundreds of children from the entire parish of Los Santos for over 60 years, a teacher without salary. With her father, she refounded the San Juan de Dios hospital, and the Regional Hospital of Azuero bears her name, now called the Anita Moreno Regional Hospital. Together with the Christian Brothers of La Salle (1905-1922) with evenings and theaters, she rebuilt the tower of the church of San Atanasio, which collapsed due to an earthquake in October 1913, the new rectory in the 1930s, and the renovations of the church in 1946.

Among her virtues, her simplicity, vocation, and devotion to the Virgin Mary stood out, as well as her dedication to the poor and the sick. She presided over the Lay Association of the Sacred Heart of Jesus, the Daughters of the Immaculate Mary, the Parish Catholic Action, and was president of the pro-seminary works for the training of new priests in the Province of Los Santos.

She was well known for her work, receiving the Cross Pro Ecclesia et Pontifice as well as inducted into the Vasco Núñez de Balboa Order.

== Beatification process ==
Ana Maria Moreno died on 11 November 1977 with a reputation for holiness. On 28 May 1993 hundreds of faithful requested the Bishop of Chitré, José María Carrizo Villarreal, to open the beatification process. Investigations eventually started, probably due to the political and economic situation of the country, eventually in February 2018 and commenced in November 2020. The postulator of the cause is Pedro Moreno Mina OSA.
