= José Luis Lacunza Maestrojuán =

Catholic Cardinal

His Eminence José Luis Lacunza Maestrojuán O.A.R.
- Cardinal, Bishop Emeritus of David
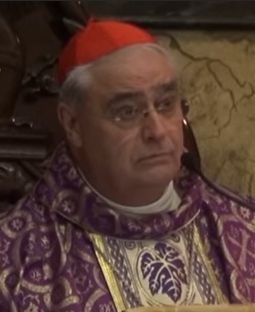
- Diocese: David
- Appointed: 2 July 1999
- Term ended: 15 February 2024
- Predecessor: Daniel Enrique Núñez Núñez
- Successor: Luis Enrique Saldaña Guerra
- Other post: Cardinal-Priest of San Giuseppe da Copertino
- Previous posts: Bishop of Chitré (1994–1999); Titular Bishop of Parthenia (1985–1994); Auxiliary Bishop of Panamá (1985–1994)

Orders
- Ordination: 13 July 1969
- Consecration: 18 January 1986 by José Sebastián Laboa Gallego
- Created cardinal: 14 February 2015 by Pope Francis
- Rank: Cardinal-Priest

Personal details
- Born: 24 February 1944 (age 82) Pamplona, Navarre, Spain
- Denomination: Roman Catholic
- Motto: Praesumus si prosumus (We have authority if we serve)
- Coat of arms: José Luis Lacunza Maestrojuán's coat of arms

Styles of José Luis Lacunza Maestrojuán, O.A.R.
- Reference style: His Eminence
- Spoken style: Your Eminence
- Informal style: Cardinal
- See: David

Ordination history of José Luis Lacunza Maestrojuán
History
Episcopal consecration
- Principal consecrator: José Sebastián Laboa Gallego
- Co-consecrators: Marcos Gregorio McGrath, CSC; José Agustin Ganuza García, OAR
Cardinalate
- Elevated by: Pope Francis

José Luis Lacunza Maestrojuán, O.A.R. (Spanish pronunciation: [xoˈse lwis laˈkunθa maestɾoˈxwan]; born 24 February 1944), is a Spanish-born Panamanian Catholic prelate who served as Bishop of David from 1999 to 2024. He is a member of the Order of Augustinian Recollects. Pope Francis made him a cardinal in 2015.

== Biography ==
Lacunza was born in Pamplona, Spain, in 1944. He was accepted as a candidate by the Recollect friars and studied at the St. Joseph Minor Seminary which they operated in Artieda, Zaragoza. Following this, he was received into the novitiate of the Order, at the conclusion of which he professed temporary religious vows and received the habit of the Order on 14 September 1964. He was then sent to do his university-level studies, first at the seminary run by the friars at their Monastery of Our Lady of Valentuñana in Sos del Rey Católico, Zaragoza, and later at the Augustinian Seminary of Our Lady of Consolation in Pamplona. Following graduation, he was sent to do his theological studies at the Major Seminary of Our Lady of Pamplona. At the conclusion of his studies, he professed his solemn vows as a full and permanent member of the Order on 16 September 1967 and he was ordained priest on 13 July 1969, both occurring in Pamplona.

After his ordination, Lacunza was sent for a time to teach Latin and Religion at the Colegio Nuestra Señora del Buen Consejo (Our Lady of Good Counsel) in Madrid, administered by the Augustinian friars. Soon after he was sent by his Order to teach at their school the Colegio San Agustín in Panama City, serving as rector from 1979 to 1985. During this period, he also served on the board of directors of the Universidad Católica Santa María La Antigua, as well earning a licentiate in Philosophy and History from the University of Panama with his published thesis, Fundamento Espiritual de la Edad Moderna ("The Spiritual Foundations of the Modern Age"). He became rector of the university in 1985 as well as Rector of St. Joseph the Great Seminary, serving the Archdiocese of Panama. He was later appointed as Vicar General of the archdiocese.

Lacunza was appointed an auxiliary bishop of the archdiocese by Pope John Paul II on 30 December 1985, for which he was consecrated on 18 January 1985, with the titular see of Parthenia. On 29 October 1994, Pope John Paul appointed him the Bishop of Chitré. He was transferred to the office of Bishop of David by the same pope on 2 July 1999. He came to serve as President of the Episcopal Conference of Panama (2010–2013) as well as an official of the Latin American Episcopal Conference (CELAM). During this time he achieved national prominence through his mediation of a violent dispute which broke out between the government and the indigenous Ngöbe–Buglé people over the mining of their ancestral lands.

4 January 2015, Pope Francis announced that he would make him a cardinal on 14 February. At that ceremony, he was assigned the Church of San Giuseppe da Copertino as his titular church. He was the first member of his order (established in 1588) and the first Panamanian to be named a cardinal.

At the Synod on the Family in 2015, Lacunza argued that Moses was more merciful than Jesus because he permitted divorce, and asked, "Why can't Peter be more like Moses?"

Lacunza presided at the beatification of James Miller on 7 December 2019 in Huehuetenango, Guatemala.

== See also ==
- Cardinals created by Pope Francis

Catholic Church titles
Preceded by	Titular Bishop of Parthenia; 1985–1994	Succeeded by Jacques Gaillot
Preceded by José María Carrizo Villarreal	Bishop of Chitré; 1994–1999	Succeeded by Fernando Torres Durán
Preceded by Daniel Enrique Núñez Núñez	Bishop of David; 1999–2024	Succeeded by Luis Enrique Saldaña Guerra
Preceded by titular church established	Cardinal Priest of San Giuseppe da Copertino; 2015–present	Incumbent
