= Mauretania Sitifensis =

Roman province in Northwest Africa

Provincia Mauretania Sitifensis
- Province of the Roman Empire
- AD 293–AD 585
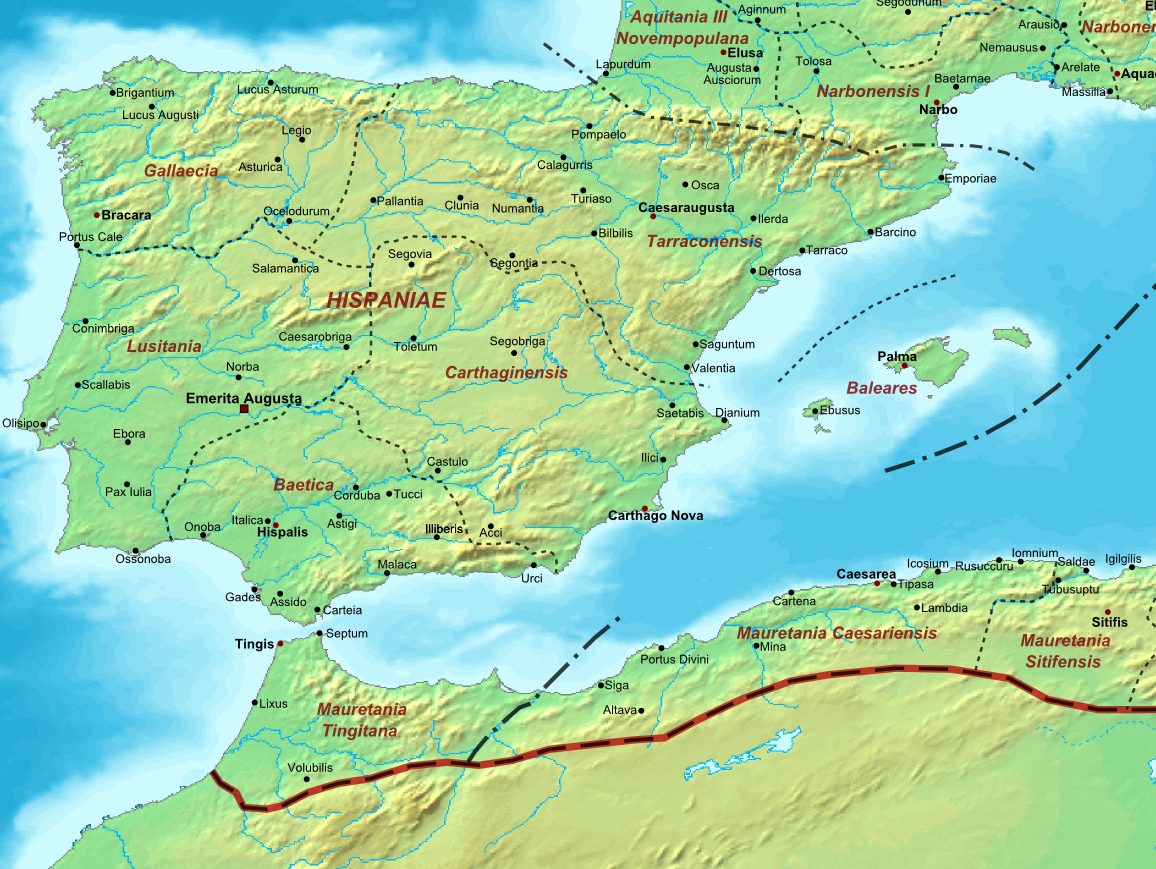
- The province of Mauretania Sitifensis within the Roman Empire in AD 400
- Capital: Setifis
- Historical era: Late antiquity
  - Established: AD 293
  - Byzantine creation of "Mauretania Prima": AD 585
- Today part of: Algeria

Mauretania Sitifensis was a Roman province in Northwest Africa. The capital was Setifis.

== History ==
In the later division of the Roman Empire under the Emperor Diocletian, the eastern part of Mauretania Caesariensis, from Saldae to the river Ampsaga, was split into a new province, and called Mauretania Sitifensis named after the inland town of Setifis (Setif in modern Algeria).

At the time of Constantine the Great, Mauretania Sitifensis was assigned to the administrative Diocese of Africa, under the Praetorian prefecture of Italy. The new province had a huge economic development in the 4th century, until the conquest by the Vandals. In this province, the Christian denomination known as Donatism challenged the Roman Church (which was the main local religion after Constantine), while Setifis was a center of Mithraism.

After the fall of the Western Roman Empire, certain areas of Mauretania Sitifensis were under Vandal and later Byzantine control, but most of the province (until 578 AD) was ruled by Berber kingdoms like the Kingdom of Altava. Only the coastal area around Saldae and Setifis remained fully Romanized.

Byzantine emperor Maurice in 585 AD created the province of Mauretania Prima and erased the old Mauretania Sitifensis. Indeed, the emperor Maurice in that year created the office of "Exarch", which combined the supreme civil authority of a praetorian prefect and the military authority of a magister militum, and enjoyed considerable autonomy from Constantinople. Two exarchates were established, one in Italy, with its seat at Ravenna (hence known as the Exarchate of Ravenna), and one in Africa, based at Carthage and including all imperial possessions in the Western Mediterranean. The first African exarch was the Patricius Gennadius: he was appointed as magister militum Africae in 578 AD, and quickly defeated the Romano-Moorish kingdom of Garmul in Mauretania extending the territory of the Mauretania Sitifensis. Among the provincial changes done by emperor Maurice, Mauretania Caesariensis and Mauretania Sitifensis were re-merged as a province of Mauretania Prima.

Mauretania Sitifensis initially had an area of 17800 square miles and had a good agriculture (cereals, etc..), that was exported through the port of Saldae. But under Byzantine control the province was reduced to only the coastal section, with one third of the original area.

== Episcopal sees ==
Ancient episcopal sees of the late Roman province of Mauretania Sitifensis, listed in the Annuario Pontificio as titular sees:

- Acufida (Cafrida)
- Arae in Mauretania (Ksar-Tarmounth)
- Assava (Hammam-Guergour)
- Asuoremixta
- Castellum in Mauretania (ruins of Aïn-Castellou?)
- Cedamusa (near the Fdoulès mountains)
- Cellae in Mauretania (Kherbet-Zerga)
- Cova (Ziama Mansouriah)
- Eminentiana
- Equizetum (Lacourbe, Ouled Agla)
- Ficus (in the region of El-Ksar or Djemâa-Si-Belcassem)
- Flumenpiscense (ruins of Kherbet-Ced-Bel-Abbas?)
- Gegi
- Horrea (ruins of Sidi-Rehane or of Aïn-Zada?)
- Horrea Aninici (ruins of Aïn-Roua)
- Ierafi (in the valley of Bou-Sellam?)
- Lemellefa (Bordj-Redir)
- Lemfocta (between Tiklat and Mlakou)
- Lesvi
- Macri
- Macriana in Mauretania
- Maronana (ruins of Aïn-Melloud?)
- Medjana (Medianas Zabuniorum)
- Molicunza (ruins of Makou?)
- Mons in Mauretania (ruins of Henchir-Casbalt?)
- Mopta (ruins of El-Ouarcha?)
- Murcona
- Novaliciana (Kherbet Madjouba or Beni-Fouda)
- Oliva (ruins of Drâa-El-Arba?, ruins of Tala, Mellal?)
- Parthenia
- Perdices (ruins of Aïn-Hamiet?)
- Privata (near Safiet-El-Hamra Mountain)
- Saldae
- Satafis (Aïn El Kebira)
- Sertei (Kherbet-Guidra)
- Sitifis, Metropolitan Archdiocese
- Socia
- Surista
- Tamagrista (near Mount Magris)
- Tamallula (Ras El Oued)
- Tamascani (Kerbet-Zembia-Cerez?)
- Thibuzabetum (Aïn-Melloul?)
- Thucca in Mauretania
- Tinista
- Vamalia (ruins of Biar-Haddada?)
- Zabi (Bechilga)
- Zallata

== See also ==
- Mauretania Tingitana

== Bibliography ==
- Arrowsmith, Aaron. A Compendium of Ancient and Modern Geography. Editor E.P. Williams, 1856 (New York Library) New York, 2007
- Serge Lancel et Omar Daoud. L'Algérie antique : De Massinissa à saint Augustin, Place des Victoires, 2008 (ISBN 9782844591913)
- Martindale, John R.; Jones, A.H.M.; Morris, John (1992), The Prosopography of the Later Roman Empire – Volume III, AD 527–641, Cambridge University Press, ISBN 0-521-20160-8
- Shlosser, Franziska E. (1994). The Reign of the Emperor Maurikios (582–602). A reassessment (Historical Monographs 14). Athens.
