= Joseph Duval =

French Catholic bishop

His Excellency Joseph Marie Louis Duval
- Archbishop emeritus of Rouen
- Church: Roman Catholic Church
- See: Archdiocese of Rouen
- Predecessor: André Louis Marie Pailler
- Successor: Jean-Charles Marie Descubes

Orders
- Ordination: 8 June 1952
- Consecration: 6 July 1974 by Paul Gouyon
- Rank: Archbishop

Personal details
- Born: 11 October 1928 Chênex, France
- Died: 23 May 2009 (aged 80) Saint-Jorioz, France

Joseph Marie Louis Duval (11 October 1928 – 23 May 2009) was the French Roman Catholic Archbishop of the Roman Catholic Archdiocese of Rouen.

Born in Chênex, Duval was ordained to the priesthood on 8 June 1953. On 14 May 1974 Pope Paul VI appointed Duval auxiliary bishop of the Roman Catholic Archdiocese of Rennes, and he was consecrated on 6 July 1974. On 5 June 1978 Pope Paul VI appointed Duval Coadjutor Archbishop of Rouen and, on 6 May 1981, he became the archbishop. He retired on 16 October 2003.

Archbishop Duval was concerned about the activities of Bishop Jacques Gaillot while archbishop.
