= Call to Action =

Catholic progressive organization

Call To Action (CTA) is an American progressive organization that advocates a variety of changes in the Catholic Church. Call To Action's goals are to change church disciplines and teachings in such areas as mandatory celibacy for priests, the male-only priesthood, the selection process for bishops and popes, and opposition to artificial contraception.

The organization has from its beginning inspired considerable controversy within the Catholic Church in the United States. Cardinal Giovanni Battista Re of the Congregation for Bishops said in 2006 that some of CTA's views are "in contrast" with the Catholic faith. The Diocese of Lincoln has placed the group under the ban of excommunication within the diocese, and several other bishops have censured the organization.

== History ==
In 1971, Pope Paul VI wrote that the laity of the Catholic Church should "take up as their own proper task the renewal of the temporal order". He further wrote that, "it is to all Christians that we address a fresh and insistent call to action." In anticipation of the American bi-centennial, the bishops of the United States held a "Call to Action Conference" in Detroit, Michigan in 1976.

At the conclusion of the three-day conference, the 1,340 delegates voted that the Catholic Church should "reevaluate its positions on issues like celibacy for priests, the male-only clergy, homosexuality, birth control, and the involvement of every level of the church in important decisions," though they never explicitly proposed changing the Church's position on these issues.

Russell Shaw describes the conference as "a raucous, controversial, non-representative dud." Many bishops were unhappy with the results.

As a result, the Call To Action organization that was born out of the Detroit conference was run by laity. Based in Chicago, it takes its name from the original conference. A conference of over 400 people was held in October 1978, and Chicago Call To Action was launched as a local organization.

== Controversies ==
=== Ideological aspects ===
Call To Action's goals include 1) women's ordination, 2) an end to mandatory priestly celibacy, 3) changes in the church's teaching on a variety of sexual matters including artificial contraception, and 4) the selection process for bishops and popes.

In “Catholic Social Activism – Real or Rad/Chic?”, Father Andrew Greeley saw the old social- justice action in labor schools, worker priests, and community organizing that “mastered the politics of coalition building with the system.” On the other hand, the “new” Catholic action came out of the Berrigan brothers' experience during the Vietnam war and the peace movement, and was thus involved in confrontation and protest. Call To Action, it would seem represents that "new", tradition."

This approach, however, is opposed by many Catholic groups. "Call to Holiness", held its first conference in 1996 to oppose a conference organized by Call To Action.

=== Reactions from the Catholic hierarchy and theologians ===
Catholic church leaders have also criticized Call To Action, primarily because they believe that the moral and juridical positions of the organization run counter to the teachings of the Catholic Church. Some, however, have given public support. At the 1995 Call To Action conference, for example, the former Bishop of Évreux now titular bishop of Partenia, Jacques Gaillot, popularly nicknamed The Red Cleric; the auxiliary Bishop of Detroit Thomas Gumbleton, and theologian Hans Küng (whose authority to teach theology in a Catholic institution was rescinded), were among the featured speakers. Other theologians, such as Charles Curran and Benedictine Sister Joan Chittister are also supporters of the organization.

In recent years, Bishop Gumbleton (now deceased) has been the only member of the U.S. Catholic hierarchy to publicly support Call To Action. When Call To Action sponsored a speech by Gumbleton in Tucson, Arizona in February 2007, the Bishop of Tucson, Gerald F. Kicanas, refused permission for it to be delivered on diocesan property.

=== Excommunications in Lincoln, Nebraska ===
Bishop Fabian Bruskewitz of the Diocese of Lincoln issued, under certain conditions, an automatic interdict (which escalates after one month to an automatic excommunication) on members of several organizations within his diocese, including Call To Action. The excommunications did not apply beyond the diocese. The group appealed, but the excommunications were affirmed by the Congregation for Bishops in 2006. The congregation's prefect, Cardinal Giovanni Battista Re, wrote to Bishop Bruskewitz that his action "was properly taken within [his] competence as pastor of that diocese". The Congregation for Bishops was not issuing a doctrinal statement here but rather a juridical statement saying that Bishop Bruskewitz had acted properly within his own jurisdiction as ordinary of the Diocese of Lincoln. However, Cardinal Re's statement did include strongly worded doctrinal criticisms as well, even to the extent of saying that "to be a member of this association or to support it is irreconcilable with a coherent living of the Catholic faith". Yet the organization has continued with a wide range of activities including annual conferences and regional groups, and in 2013 it attempted to broaden its appeal under the tagline, "Inspire Catholics, Transform Church".

== See also ==
- Voice of the Faithful
- FutureChurch
- "A Call To Action: Women, Religion, Violence, And Power", book advocates greater empowerment of women and equality
