= Religion and the Internet =

Overview of the relation between the Internet and religion

Religions are represented on the Internet in many ways. There are sites which attempt to cover all religions, traditions, and faiths, such as Patheos (which also provides a forum for atheism and Humanism), Religious Tolerance, and Beliefnet. There are also sites that are specific to a religious tradition. Many sites are discussion groups, others host theological debates, and some provide advice concerning religious doctrine. Some sites aim to provide a religious experience facilitating prayer, meditation, or virtual pilgrimages. People also leverage search engines to investigate aspects of religion. Some religious websites are translated into several languages. For example, JW.ORG features content in over 1,000 languages.

== Christianity ==
There have been a number of attempts to create online Christian communities, usually supplementing, but occasionally attempting to replace, more traditional, brick and mortar Christian communities. It is common for even moderate sized Christian churches with only a few hundred members to have web sites to advertise themselves and communicate with their congregations. For example, Scott Thumma, a faculty associate at the Hartford Institute for Religion Research found that in the U.S. between 1998 and 2002, the ratio of churches with web sites went from 11 percent to 45 percent. Most sites concentrate on teaching and discussion. Some experiment with virtual meetings in cyberspace, and attempt to incorporate teaching, prayer, worship and even music into the experience. The i-church is the first Internet community to be fully recognised as an Anglican church.

After being reassigned to the sinecure diocese of Partenia (a major Algerian city, that was consumed by the Sahara in the 5th century) by Pope John Paul II in 1995 as punishment for his controversial views, Roman Catholic Bishop Jacques Gaillot set up a website for the "diocese without borders."

=== Internet church ===
The terms internet church, online church, cyberchurch, and digital church refer to a wide variety of ways that Christian religious groups can use the internet to facilitate their religious activities, particularly prayer, discussion, preaching and worship services. The internet has become a site for religious experience which has raised questions related to ecclesiology.

Some Christian denominations insist that an online gathering is not a real substitute for meeting in person, for example, the Roman Catholic Pontifical Council for Social Communications declared in 2002 that "the virtual reality of cyberspace cannot substitute for real interpersonal community, the incarnational reality of the sacraments and the liturgy, or the immediate and direct proclamation of the gospel", while acknowledging that the internet can still "enrich the religious lives of users".

== Hinduism ==
There are various web sites that aim to cover all of the Hindu religious traditions, including for example the Hindu Universe, which is maintained by the Hindu Studies Council. The site includes Hindu scripture and commentaries of the Rig Veda, Upanishads, the Bhagvad Gita and the laws of Manu.

In addition, there are a large number of web sites devoted to specific aspects of the Hindu tradition. For example, the major epics, the Mahabharata and the Ramayana, have web sites devoted to their study. There is a site devoted to the Kumbh Mela pilgrimage, giving Internet users the opportunity to join the hundreds of thousands of pilgrims who gather in Allahabad to bathe in the Ganges. Sites like Saranam.com allow worshippers to order a puja at the Hindu temple of their choosing and many pages have image of deities, which are thought to convey Darshan in the same manner as temple figures. The followers of Sri Vaishnava, Swaminarayan Sampraday and Dvaita Vedanta have web sites, and the International Society for Krishna Consciousness, also known as the Hare Krishnas, have their own site, which includes a Hare Krishna Network. Temples now webcast darshan live on the internet. In fact, important events too are broadcast live on the internet. For example, the Swaminarayan Temple in Cardiff broadcast its 25th anniversary celebrations live on the internet in 2007.

== Islam ==
Islamic sites fulfill a number of distinct roles, such as providing advice concerning religious doctrine, download daily prayers and for taking the shahadah over the Internet. For example, the Islam Page is a comprehensive Islamic web site, which links to a complete version of the Quran. Sites such as the Islam-Online site, according to Gary Bunt of the University of Wales, provide information about Islamic doctrine in addition to advice concerning individual problems including marriage, worship and Internet use. In order to answer online questions, an Imam or a team of religious scholars frequently provide a fatwa. These are stored in databases, which allow online users to search for their specific query. Gary Bunt has commented this has the advantage of facilitating resolution to issues that are considered dangerous or embarrassing to raise within the domestic framework.

== Judaism ==
Several websites and blogs cover Judaism and Jewish life on the web. Some websites argue a certain religious or political viewpoint, while some take a purely cultural or secular focus. Conservative, Modern Orthodox, post-denominational, Reform, secular, and Haredi Jews are involved in writing J-blogs. Some J-bloggers, although religious in practice, use their blogs to discuss theological views which are skeptical or nonconformist. J-blogs fall into radical, liberal and conservative camps with respect to all Jewish communities across the world. Several blogs, such as CampusJ and Jewschool, cover Jewish life on campus.

== Vodou ==
The Internet has "shipped" Vodou via cyberspace, increasing its accessibility outside of a Haitian context as there is no central text to be shared. Alexandra Boutros explains that while Vodou was formerly secret, it is now public, widespread, and available for consumption by any through the cyber world. Her concern is that the shipping of Vodou has led Internet, much like popular culture, to be full of "voodoo that is not Vodou." "Voodoo" is a spelling used to denote tropes of Vodou, the Haitian tradition, which perpetuate misunderstandings, lies, and stereotypes. As such, Boutros explains that online Vodou, as well as cyberspirituality in general, are not representations of "real religions in real places," but instead are their own "dynamic entity," and this is an important distinction to make when studying Vodou or any other religion and its online presence.

== New religious movements ==
Many new religious movements have websites. A website of the Church of Scientology, for example, allows visitors to take an online personality test (the Oxford Capacity Analysis); however, to review the full results of this test, one has to make an appointment to meet a church representative in person. There has also been a series of legal battles—sometimes referred to as Scientology versus the Internet—concerning the publishing of esoteric teachings such as the "space opera" and, more specifically, Xenu.

According to Stephen O'Leary of the University of Southern California, the Falun Gong's Internet awareness was an important factor in its ability to organize unauthorized demonstrations in the People's Republic of China. The group's leader, Li Hongzhi, was able to use the Internet to coordinate the movement, although he currently lives in New York.

Regarding the discourse relationship between multifarious NRMs within the Black Conscious Community, Christopher W. Brooks observes that groups such as the Hebrew Israelites and Kemetic Egyptologists “have a strong Internet presence where they post statements regarding each other, often generating heated debate and disagreement, accusing one another of being wrong.” To that end, in his Cambridge monograph on Hebrew Israelites, Michael T. Miller, observes that One West Hebrew Israelite camps “communicate and proselytize principally through their street and web presence” and that “most groups have a website and constantly active YouTube and social media accounts.”

There are various religious movements that have used the Internet extensively and this has been studied by academics, in the field of sociology of religion. Examples cited by Adam Possamai, of the University of Western Sydney, include Jediism and Matrixism. Possamai uses the term 'hyper-real religion' to describe these religions mixed with popular culture, arguing that they are part of the consumer logic of late capitalism and are enhanced by the growing use of the internet.

== Cybersectarianism ==
Cybersectarianism is the phenomenon of new religious movements and other groups using the Internet for text distribution, recruitment, and information sharing.

== Virtual religion ==
David Chidester wrote in his 2005 book Authentic Fakes, that "If it were possible to trace a genealogy of virtual religions on the Internet, it would probably begin with Discordianism." According to J. Christian Greer, this study was published just at the time Discordianism had transformed itself from a parody religion to a new religious movement. When the Yahoo search engine categorized Discordianism as a parody religion, in May 2001 Discordians started an email campaign to get their religion reclassified. Three weeks after this protest was started, Yahoo moved Discordianism to "Entertainment—Religion—Humor", which some Discordians found more acceptable. David G. Robertson writes in the 2016 book Fiction, Invention and Hyper-reality that:

[...] Discordians have also constructed a complex and unique cosmology and theology, and Discordianism has over time come to be considered as having genuine religious significance for many of its adherents. Thus Discordianism can no longer be considered a purely parodic religion.

== See also ==
- Association of Religion Data Archives
- Church of the SubGenius
- Operation Clambake
- Operation Mindfuck
- Patheos
