= Mascula =

Ancient Roman city in modern day Algeria

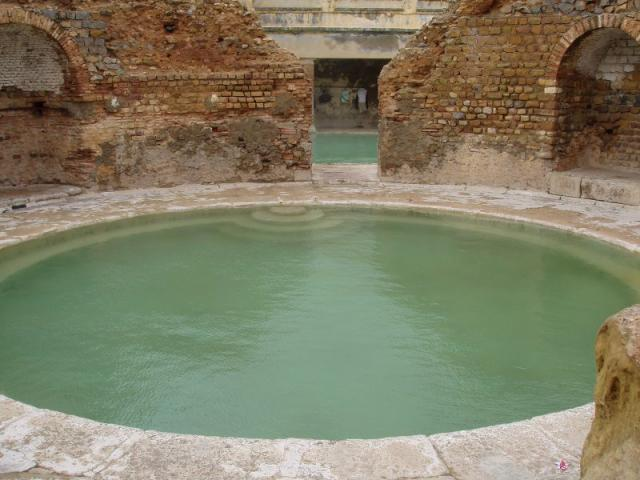
- Roman Baths of Mascula

- Location within Algeria
- 35.416667°N 7.133333°E
- Location: Algeria
- Region: Khenchela Province

Mascula was an ancient Roman colonia in Numidia. It is called Khenchela in modern Algeria.

== History ==
Mascula was located in the Aurès Mountains (part of the Atlas Mountains), at 1,200 metres (3,900 ft) above sea level, and has a cool Mediterranean climate: it was one of the coldest cities in Numidia (even now it snows sometimes). The fresh location was chosen by Roman legionaries to retire as veterans.

Mascula was built under Trajan and was garrisoned by the "7th company of Lusitanians". It was a castrum (with a nearby vicus) on the military road, that connected Theveste with Sitifis and that followed the slopes of the Aures mountains. Mascula was connected with the fortifications of Tinfadi, Vegesela, Claudi and Tliamugas. Mascula was the most important of these forts from a strategic point of view, because controlled the numidian access to the Sahara.

At a later period, when Christianity had been firmly established in Roman Africa, Mascula had a brief era of prosperity. Numerous Christian ornaments have been found on the site, and the names of four bishops of Mascula have been preserved—Clarus in the third century, Donatus in the fourth, Januarius at the close of the fifth, and a fourth bearing the same name early in the sixth century. It appears to have suffered terribly about the middle of the fourth century from the incursions of barbarian tribes who banded together for its destruction.......During the Byzantine occupation Solomon the general converted Mascula into a garrison town with walls of defence, and finally, when the Arabs swept over the land, its history as a town came to a close.Alexander Graham

Mascula in the fourth century was at the center of the Donatism controversy, and there are beautiful mosaics discovered from those years There are even some Roman baths from the late third century, still efficiently working after recent restoration.

Mascula was even one of the centers of Romano-berber resistance against the Arabs, under queen Kahina. It seems that was renamed -after the Moslem conquest- with the name of one of the daughters of Kahina: Khenchela (meaning "angel" in berber).

== Bibliography ==
- Dunbabin, Katherine. Mosaics of the Greek and Roman World.Publisher Cambridge University Press. Cambridge, 1999 ISBN 0521002303
- Graham Alexander. Roman Africa: An Outline of the History of the Roman Occupation of North Africa, Based Chiefly Upon Inscriptions and Monumental Remains in that Country. Publisher Longmans, Green, and Company. London, 1902 (University of California)

== See also ==
- Cirta
- Lambaesis
- Theveste
- Sitifis
- Milevum
