= Parthenia (Mauretania) =

Ancient North African town in modern Algeria

Approximate location of Parthenia in modern Algeria

Parthenia was a Roman–Berber town in the former Roman province of Mauretania Sitifensis, the easternmost part of ancient Mauretania. It was located in what is now northern Algeria.

== History ==
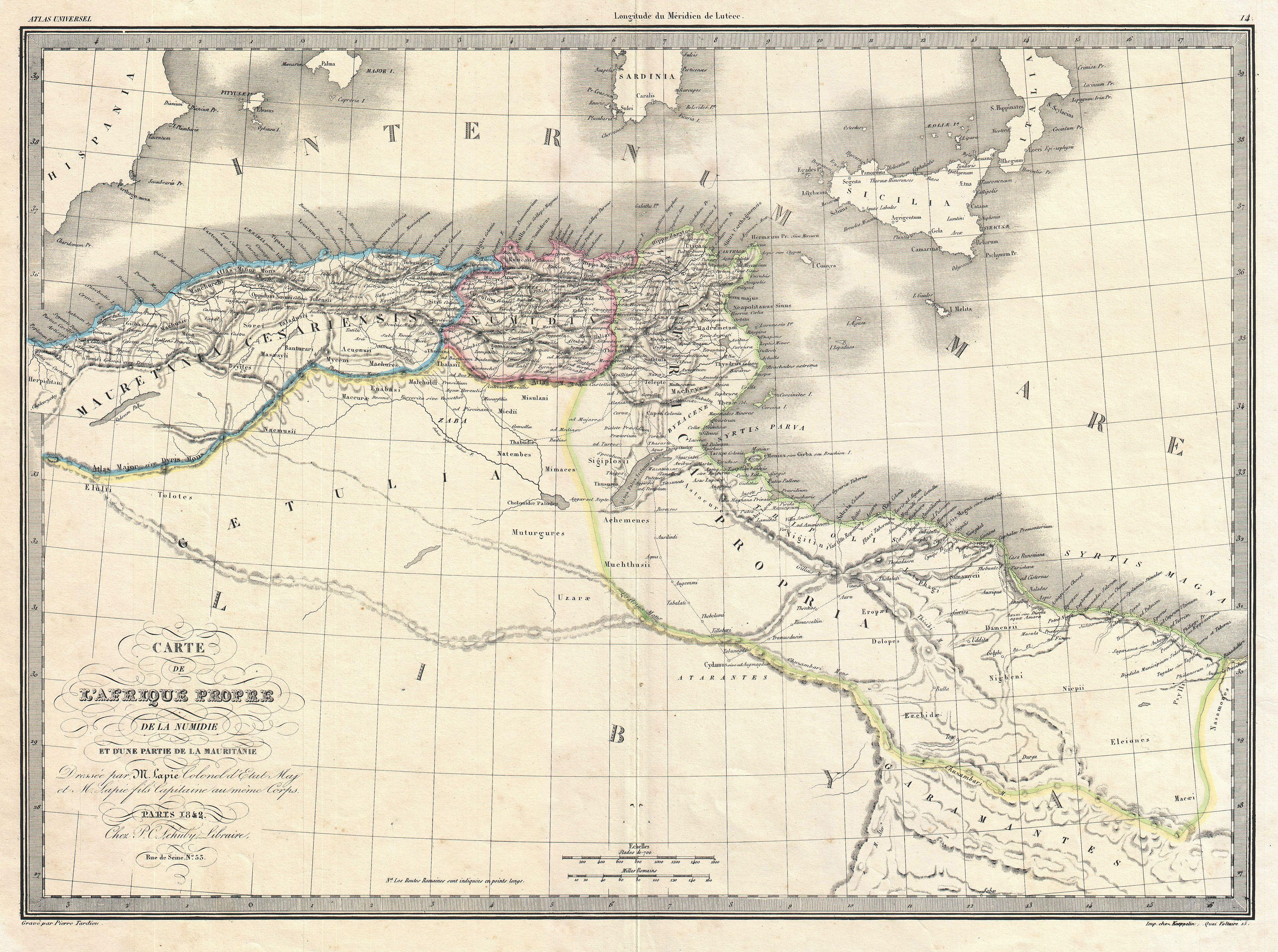
Map of Roman North Africa

Parthenia is one of the Maghreb cities of the Roman period whose toponym recalls the cognomen of a prominent family, usually of the patrician class, in this case the family of the Parthenii.

The Notitia Provinciarum et Civitatum Africae, part of Victor Vitensis's Historia persecutionis Africanae Provinciae, temporibus Geiserici et Hunirici regum Wandalorum, mentions Parthenia among the bishoprics of Mauretania Sitifensis. It says that the bishop Rogatus was one of those exiled by the Vandal king Huneric when he took action against the Catholic bishops in his dominions. Morcelli remarks that he could find no other mention of Parthenia in the works of the ancient geographers or other writers.

A writer on the website Partenia places the site of the ancient town and bishopric that it calls Partenia in modern Sétif Province, directly south of the city of Sétif, but says the town's exact location is unknown, since it has disappeared beneath the sand. No other map of Roman North Africa attempts to indicate where it stood. The detailed map of ancient Africa and Mauretania made available on the Internet by the Associazione Storico-Culturale S. Agostino shows no town of similar name. The name that comes closest (in that it includes four of the nine letters of the word "Parthenia" but obviously has no relation to the Parthenii family) is "Ad Partum" in an 1842 map of ancient Africa, Numidia, and part of Mauretania by the father and son Lapie. Ad Partum lay to the east of ancient Setifis, southeast of Cuiculum and southwest of Cirta.

== Bishopric ==
Parthenia is also a titular see of the Roman Catholic Church. It was titular see of former bishop of Évreux, Jacques Gaillot after being removed from the office due to his controversial views.

In February 484, Rogatus, Bishop of Parthenia, was one of the Catholic bishops whom the Arian Vandal Huneric summoned to a meeting at Carthage and then exiled.

No longer a residential bishopric, Parthenia is now listed by the Catholic Church as a titular see.

=== Past bishops ===
- Victor fl
- Rogatus fl. 484
- Giovanni Fallani (1964–1985)
- José Luis Lacunza Maestrojuán (1985–1994)
- Jacques Gaillot (1995–2023)

=== Jacques Gaillot ===
Logo of the Internet site of Partenia

The titular see of Parthenia was assigned to Bishop Jacques Gaillot when he was transferred on 13 January 1995 from the residential diocese of Évreux in France. Gaillot had been noted for his public expression of support for controversial church critic Eugen Drewermann, married priests and the use of condoms and for taking a lenient view with regard to homosexual activity and procurement of abortion.

The other French bishops complained to him for breaching the confidentiality of the meetings of the episcopal conference and for voicing positions contrary to the Church's magisterium. The president of the conference appealed to him, "if not to retract, then at least to cease making declarations opposed to the teachings and doctrine of the Catholic Church".

On his removal from the see of Évreux, Gaillot established an Internet site, called "Partenia", the Italian version of the name of his titular see, in which to express his ideas, but ceased to write on it in 2010.

== See also ==
- Religion and the internet
- Setifis
- Cuicul
- Mauretania Caesariensis
- Caesarea

== Bibliography ==
- Jacques Gaillot: EGLISE VIRTUELLE, EGLISE DE L'AN 2000. Un évêque au royaume d'Internet. Editions Albin Michel, 7. Januar 1999, ISBN 978-2226106735
- Laffi, Umberto. Colonie e municipi nello Stato romano Ed. di Storia e Letteratura. Roma, 2007 ISBN 8884983509
- Mommsen, Theodore. The Provinces of the Roman Empire Section: Roman Africa. (Leipzig 1865; London 1866; London: Macmillan 1909; reprint New York 1996) Barnes & Noble. New York, 1996
- Pierre Pierrard: A nous la parole : Partenia, dix ans. Harmattan 17. Oktober 2012, Kindle Edition, ASIN B00814BKFQ
