= Saldae =

Ancient Roman port city

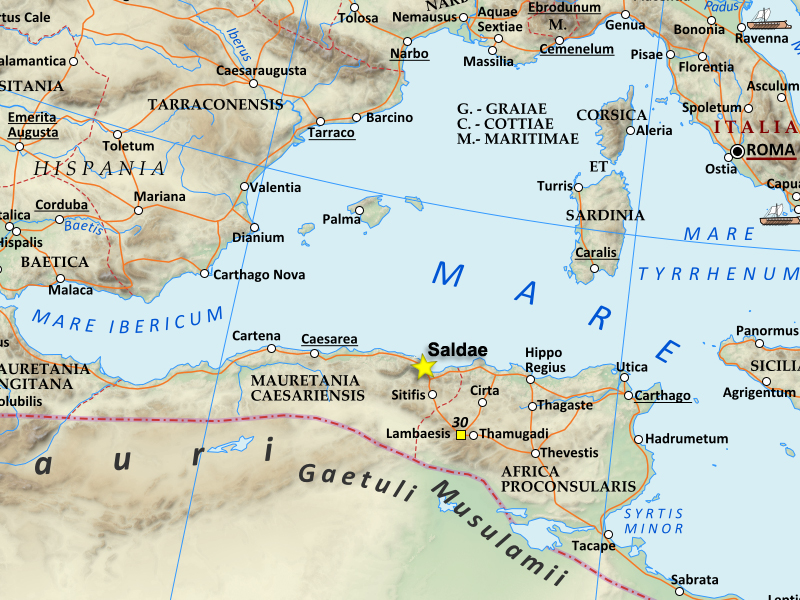
- Location of Saldae in the second century AD, during Hadrian's reign

- Location within Algeria
- 36.75°N 5.066667°E
- Location: Algeria
- Region: Béjaïa Province

Saldae was an important port city in the ancient Roman Empire, located at today's Béjaïa (in Kabylia, eastern Algeria). It was generally a crossroads between eastern and western segments of Northern Africa, from the time of Carthage to the end of the Byzantine Empire from the continent.

== History ==
Saldae was first inhabited by Numidian Berbers. A minor port in Carthaginian and in early Roman times, it was a border town between Rome and Juba, located to the east of the ancient Berber kingdoms.

=== Roman era ===
It was made officially a Roman colony -named Civitas Salditana- during the reign of Roman emperor Octavianus Augustus. It is mentioned in Pliny the Elder's Naturalis Historia.

The Princeton Encyclopedia of Classical Sites reports:

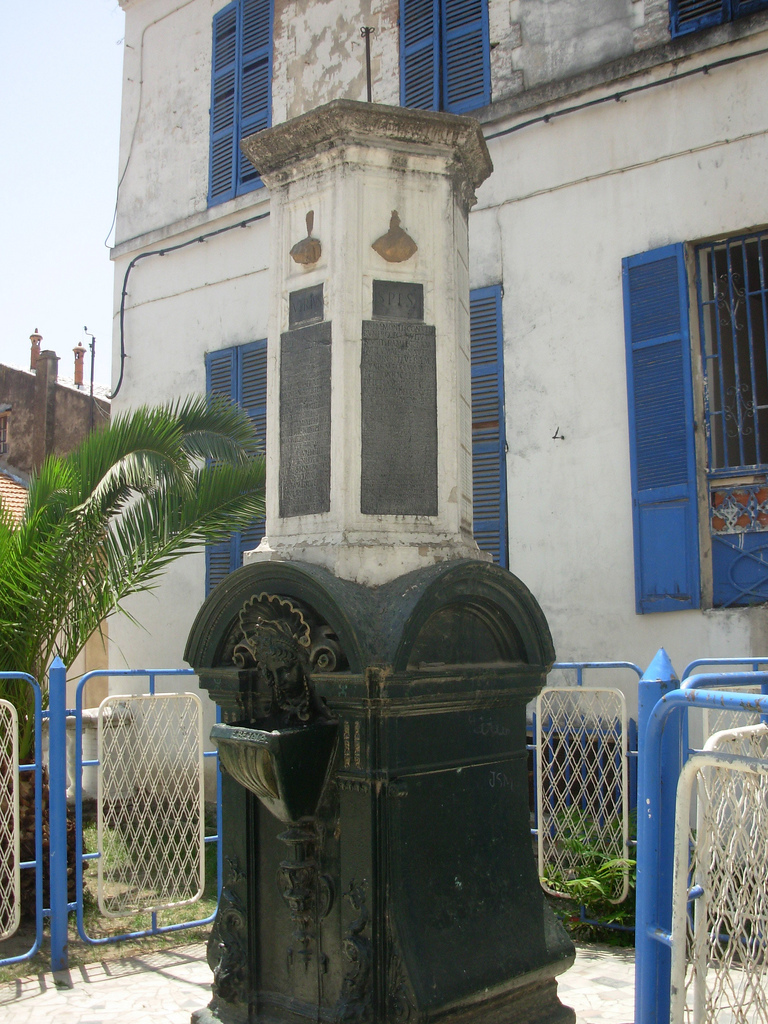
Roman "cippus" and inscribed tablets to Nonius Datus

The Roman period has left more abundant remains. Vestiges of the ramparts are visible at several places....Of the monuments which have been preserved or noted, particularly interesting are the remains of a temple underneath the church, built on the site of a mosque. The temple was undoubtedly near the forum, whose location is indicated by the bases of statues. In the immediate vicinity the public baths have produced a large ornamental mosaic (a piece of it is on exhibit in the church). Other public baths were on the site of the Civil Hospital. Two similar mosaics were found there; they depict heads of sea god Oceanus flanked by Nereids (nymphs). One is at the Algiers Museum, the other at the town hall of Béjaïa. A third public bath was located near the high school. Cisterns and basins are still visible (indeed, still in use) at several places in the upper town. They were fed by the Toudja aqueduct, which brought water from springs located 21 km to the West....West of the middle town a rounded depression has been supposed variously to have been the site of a circus, an amphitheater, and a theater. No ancient remains are known that settle the question. A single inscription (CIL, VIII, 8938) mentions "ludi circenses".Many Roman sculptures have been found in the area around the town, some carved in the rock, some found in the ground, others as sarcophagi. A sarcophagus with strigils is at the Louvre. Few sculptures come from Saldae itself, mainly some capitals and votive stelae dedicated to Saturn.

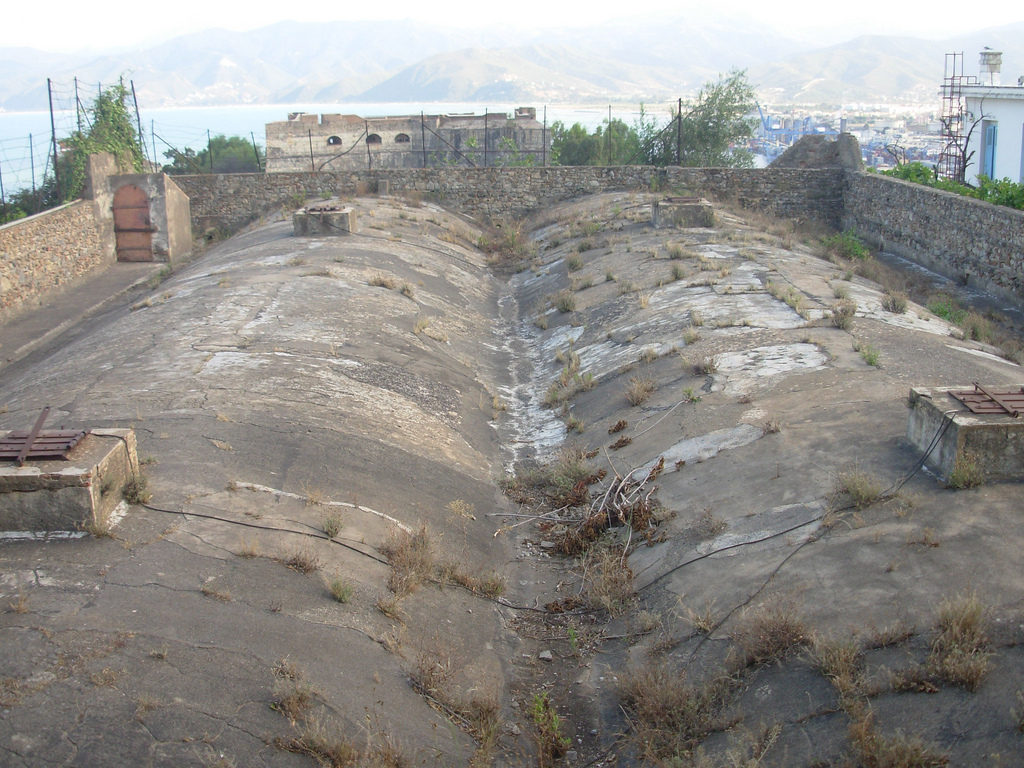
Roman vaulted cistern roof at the foot of the Toudja aqueduct

The city grew in size with new buildings and the emperor Vespasian settled the city with many Roman veterans, increasing its population and importance in the province of Mauretania Caesariensis, and when that was divided, in the new Late Roman province of Mauretania Sitifensis.

The city was under the Roman ius (law) and its citizens were endowed with full civil rights. Saldae was a center of a Mauretania Caesariensis area fully Romanised, that in the late third century was even fully Christian.

In the 3rd century AD, Gaius Cornelius Peregrinus, a decurion (town councillor) of Saldae, was a tribunus (military tribune, a commander at cohort level) of the auxiliary garrison at Alauna Carvetiorum, in northern Britain. An altar dedicated by him was discovered shortly before 1587 in the north-west corner of the fort, where it had probably been re-used in a late-Roman building.

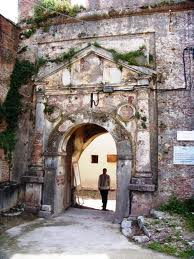
Ancient arch

=== Vandal, Byzantine and modern era ===
In the 5th century, Saldae became the capital of the short-lived Vandal Kingdom of the Germanic Vandals, which lasted about a century until 533 with the Byzantine conquest, which established an African prefecture and later the Exarchate of Carthage.

After the 7th-century Arab conquest, Saldae declined and had practically disappeared by the end of the first millennium.

In the 11th century, it was refounded as Béjaïa (v.) by the Berber Hammadid dynasty, which made it their capital, and it became an important port and centre of culture.

== Ecclesiastical history ==
With the spread of Christianity, Saldae became a bishopric. Its bishop Paschasius was one of the Catholic bishops whom the Arian Vandal king Huneric summoned to the Council of Carthage (484) and then exiled.

Christianity survived the Arab conquest, the disappearance of the old city of Saldae, and the founding of the new city of Béjaïa. A letter of Pope Gregory VII (1073–1085) exists, addressed to clero et populo Buzee (the clergy and people of Béjaïa), in which he writes of the consecration of a bishop named Servandus for Christian north Africa.

=== Titular see ===
No longer a residential bishopric, Saldae is today listed by the Catholic Church as a titular see.

It has had a long list of incumbents, mostly of the lowest (episcopal) rank, a few of intermediate (archiepiscopal) rank:

- Albertus, Friars Minor (O.F.M.) (1415–1442)
- Johannes Frey, O.F.M. (1457.08.19 – 1474.04.08)
- Erasmus Perchinger, O.F.M. (1482.11.06 – 1483.09.26)
- Mathias Schach, Carthusians (O. Cart.) (1495.11.19 – 1515.11.05)
- Konrad Mair (1517.07.21 – 1522)
- Hieronim Antoni Szeptycki (1739.07.20 – 1759.09.24)
- Ignatius Krzyzanowski (1762.06.14 – ?)
- Bernard-Claude Panet (Titular bishop 1806.07.12 – 1819.01.12), later Titular Archbishop (1819.01.12 – 1825.12.04)
- Daniel O’Connell, O.E.S.A. (1834.04.25 – 1867.07.10)
- Joseph-Henri-Jean-Marie Prud’homme (1937.01.29 – 1952.01.05)
- Hélder Pessoa Câmara (Titular Bishop 1952.03.03 – 1955.04.02), later Titular Archbishop (1955.04.02 – 1964.03.12)
- Titular Archbishop Henri-Martin-Félix Jenny (1965.05.15 – 1966.02.15)
- Marie-Joseph Lemieux (1966.09.24 – 1994.03.04), later bishop and still later Archbishop
- Sylvester Carmel Magro, O.F.M., (1997.03.10 – ...), Apostolic Vicar of Benghazi

This titular see has, confusingly, for a long time concurrently had a counterpart (also Latin) called Bugia, the Italian form of Béjaïa, the modern name of former Saldae. Thus Bugia was the alternative title borne lastly by George Hilary Brown, titular bishop from 5 June 1840 until 22 April 1842, when he became residential bishop of Liverpool.

== See also ==
- Bugia, concurrent Italian modern name, also as a separate Catholic titular see
- Caesarea of Mauretania
- Icosium

== Bibliography ==
- Geoff Crowther & Hugh Finlay. Béjaïa & the Corniche Kabyle, Morocco, Algeria & Tunisia: a travel survival kit. Lonely Planet, 2nd Edition, April 1992
- Serge Lancel et Omar Daoud. L'Algérie antique : De Massinissa à Saint Augustin. Place des Victoires, 2008 (ISBN 9782844591913)
- Mommsen, Theodore. The Provinces of the Roman Empire Section: Roman Africa. (Leipzig 1865; London 1866; London: Macmillan 1909; reprint New York 1996) Barnes & Noble. New York, 1996
- Reynell Morell, John. Algeria: The Topography and History, Political, Social, and Natural, of French Africa. Publisher N. Cooke. London, 1854 ( )

== Sources and External links ==
- GigaCatholic, with titular incumbent biography links
- Images of Saldae in Manar al-Athar digital heritage photo archive
