= Joseph of Cupertino =

Italian Franciscan friar (1603–1663)

Saint Joseph of Cupertino OFMConv
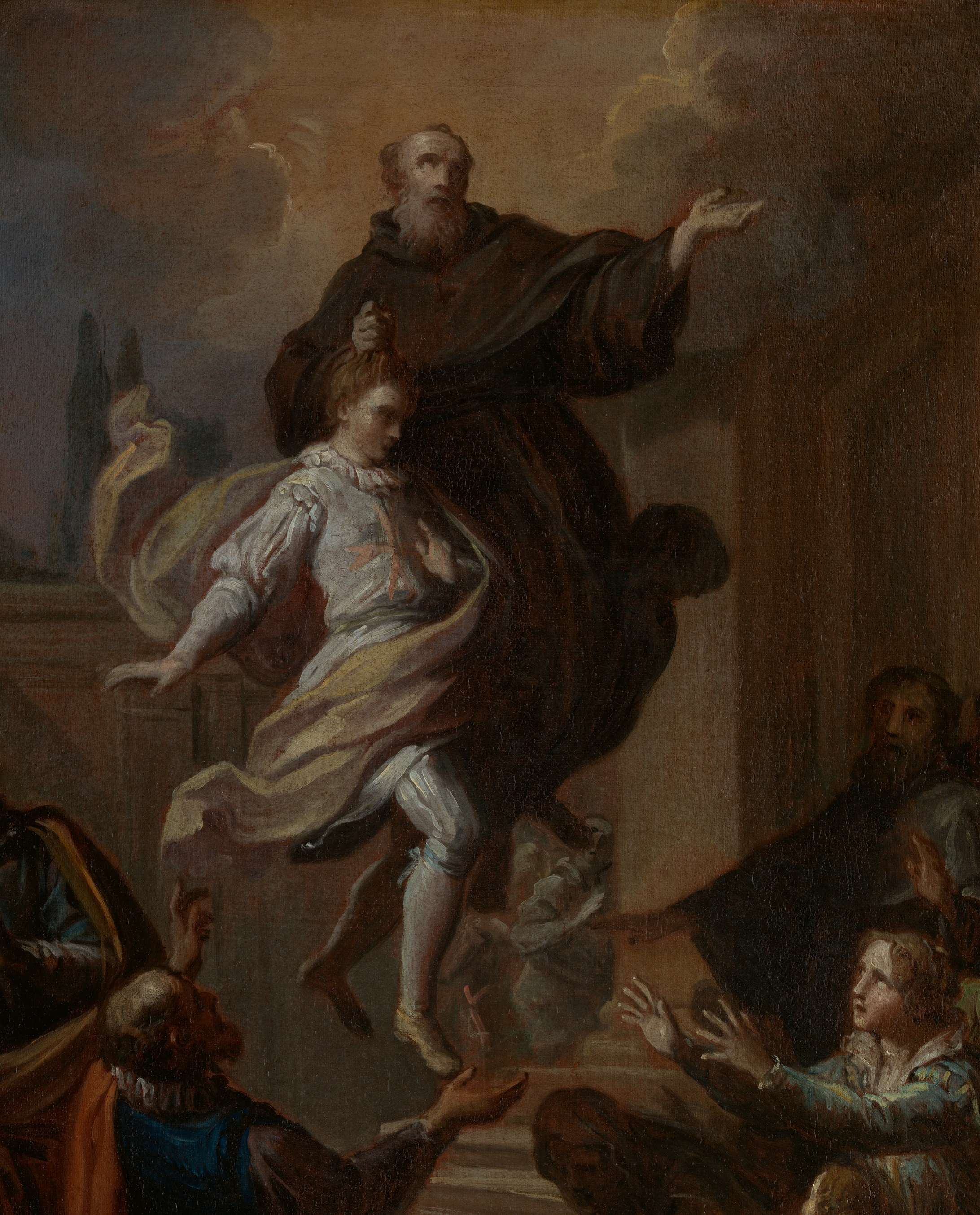
- St. Joseph of Cupertino is lifted in flight, by Placido Costanzi (17th century)

Confessor
- Born: Giuseppe Desa; 17 June 1603; Copertino, Terra di Otranto, Kingdom of Naples
- Died: 18 September 1663 (aged 60); Osimo, Marche, Papal States
- Venerated in: Roman Catholic Church (Franciscans)
- Beatified: 24 February 1753, Rome, Papal States by Pope Benedict XIV
- Canonized: 16 July 1767, Rome, Papal States by Pope Clement XIII
- Major shrine: Basilica of St. Joseph of Copertino, Piazza Gallo, 10, Osimo, Ancona, Italy
- Feast: 18 September
- Patronage: The City of Copertino and the City of Osimo, aviation, astronauts, mental handicaps, examinations, students

Joseph of Cupertino OFMConv (Italian: Giuseppe da Copertino; 17 June 1603 – 18 September 1663) was an Italian Conventual Franciscan friar and mystic and venerated as a saint. According to traditional Franciscan accounts, he was "remarkably unclever", but experienced miraculous levitation and ecstatic visions throughout his life which made him the object of scorn.

He applied to the Conventual Franciscan friars, but was rejected due to his lack of education. He then pleaded with them to serve in their stables. After several years of working there, he had impressed the friars so much with the devotion and simplicity of his life that in 1625 he was admitted to their Order, destined to become a priest.

His struggles in being ordained to the priesthood required two providential coincidences involving his exams. These incidents have earned him the title of the patron of students, exam takers and those with learning difficulties or disabilities, while his levitation has earned him the patronage of pilots and those traveling by air.

== Life ==
He was born the son of Felice Desa and Frencesca Panaca in the village of Cupertino, in the Region of Apulia, then in the Kingdom of Naples, now in the Italian Province of Lecce. His father having fled from creditors, and the family home having been seized to settle the large debts he had left, his mother was forced to give birth to him in a stable.

Already as a child, Joseph began to experience ecstatic visions which were to continue throughout his life, and made him the object of scorn. His life was not helped by his frequent outbursts of anger. He was soon apprenticed by his uncle to a shoemaker. Feeling drawn to religious life, in 1620 he applied to the Conventual Franciscan friars, but was rejected due to his lack of education. He then applied to the Capuchin friars in Martino, near Taranto, by whom he was accepted in 1620 as a lay brother, but he was dismissed as his continued ecstasies made him unfit for the duties required of him.

After Joseph returned to the scorn of his family, he pleaded with the Conventual friars near Cupertino to be allowed to serve in their stables. After several years of working there, he had so impressed the friars with the devotion and simplicity of his life that he was admitted to their Order, destined to become a priest, in 1625. However, he struggled greatly with the required academic studies. He could not comment on any scripture passage except one: "Beatus venter qui Te portavit" (Blessed be the womb that bore Thee), Luke 11:27. In his exam for ordination to the diaconate, the Bishop giving the exam opened the Gospels at random and requested that Joseph expand upon this only verse that he knew. He was able to expand upon it well and was ordained to the diaconate. Then when he was going to be tested to be ordained a priest, the Bishop questioned several of Joseph's fellow candidates, and when they replied excellently, the Bishop did not question the rest, including Joseph, assuming all the candidates were equally prepared. This allowed Joseph to be ordained a priest on 28 March 1628. He was then sent to the convent of Santa Maria della Grotella, just outside Cupertino, where he spent the next 15 years.

After this point it was claimed that he began to levitate while participating at the Mass or joining the community for the Divine Office, thereby gaining a widespread reputation of holiness among the people of the region and beyond. He was deemed disruptive by his religious superiors and church authorities, however, and eventually was confined to a small cell and forbidden to join in any public gathering of the community.

As the phenomenon of flying or levitation was widely believed to be connected with witchcraft, Joseph was denounced to the Inquisition. At their command, he was transferred from one Franciscan friary in the region to another for observation, first to Assisi (1639–1653), then briefly to Pietrarubbia and finally Fossombrone, where he lived with the Capuchin friars (1653–1657) and under their supervision. He practiced severe asceticism throughout his life, usually eating solid food only twice a week, and adding bitter powders to his meals. He passed 35 years of his life following this regimen.

Finally, on 9 July 1657, Joseph was allowed to return to a Conventual community, being sent to the one in Osimo, where he died on 18 September 1663. Joseph was beatified in 1753. On 16 July 1767, he was canonized by Pope Clement XIII.

Much of what is known of Joseph comes from testimonies contained in canonization inquests (processi) posthumously conducted from 1664 to 1695, when numerous witnesses were still alive. Inquests were used by his hagiographers, the earliest of which was composed by his confessor Roberto Nuti in 1678. Domenico Bernino, who claimed to witness an ecstasy, followed with his own work. By the time to Joseph's beatification, hagiographies by Agelli and Pastrovicchi were also present.

== Alleged levitation ==
According to Joe Nickell and Gordon Stein, eyewitness reports of Joseph's levitations are noted to be subject to exaggeration, and often written years after his death. Stein noted that Joseph's most impressive alleged levitation involved him flying 70 yards from a doorway to the top of a 36 foot high cross that his group of friars were building but such feats "were not recounted by any eyewitness and were recorded only after his death". Nickell concluded that Joseph's most dramatic aerial traverses were launched by a leap and appear to have continued by the sudden arcing trajectories that would be expected from bounding rather than circuitous or spiraling flights. Joseph's propulsions began with a shout or scream, suggesting that he was not caused to leap by some force but chose to.

Robert D. Smith in his book Comparative Miracles (1965) suggested that Joseph performed feats similar to a gymnast. Smith noted that some of his alleged levitations "originate from a leap, and not from a prone or simple standing or kneeling position, the witnesses mistook a leap of a very agile man for levitation."

Poisoning due to the consumption of rye bread made from ergot-infected grain was common in Europe in the Middle Ages. It was known to cause convulsion symptoms and hallucinations. British academic John Cornwell has suggested that Joseph had consumed rye bread (see ergot poisoning). According to Cornwell "Here, perhaps, lay the key to his levitations. After sampling his own loaves he evidently believed he was taking off—as did those who partook of his high-octane bake-offs."

Historian Carlos Eire in his book, They Flew: A History of the Impossible, wrote that he could not consign testimony of Joseph's levitations to lies or mass hysteria. According to Eire, the levitations are so extreme that trickery or illusionist contraptions are ruled out given the setting. The quantity and status of eyewitnesses, which included members of the upper class, make their accounts seem more credible, and Eire finds the evidence that the testimony is genuinely given to be compelling, though he notes that the question of whether anyone actually flew cannot be addressed by historians, and instead makes how those who reported the events saw the world the focus of his study.

== Patronage ==
Saint Joseph of Cupertino is the patron saint of the city of Cupertino, air travelers, astronauts, pilots

== Namesake ==
Joseph of Cupertino is the namesake for various places, including Cupertino Creek and the city of Cupertino in California.

== See also ==
- List of Catholic saints
- Saints and levitation
- Padre Pio – another saint with similar disruptive visions
- Religious ecstasy
- The Reluctant Saint – a 1962 movie, based on the story of Joseph of Cupertino, directed by Edward Dmytryk
- San Giuseppe da Copertino, church in Rome
