= Diocese of Chitré =

Roman Catholic diocese in Panama

Coordinates: 7.9626°N 80.4283°W

Diocese of Chitré Dioecesis Citrensis
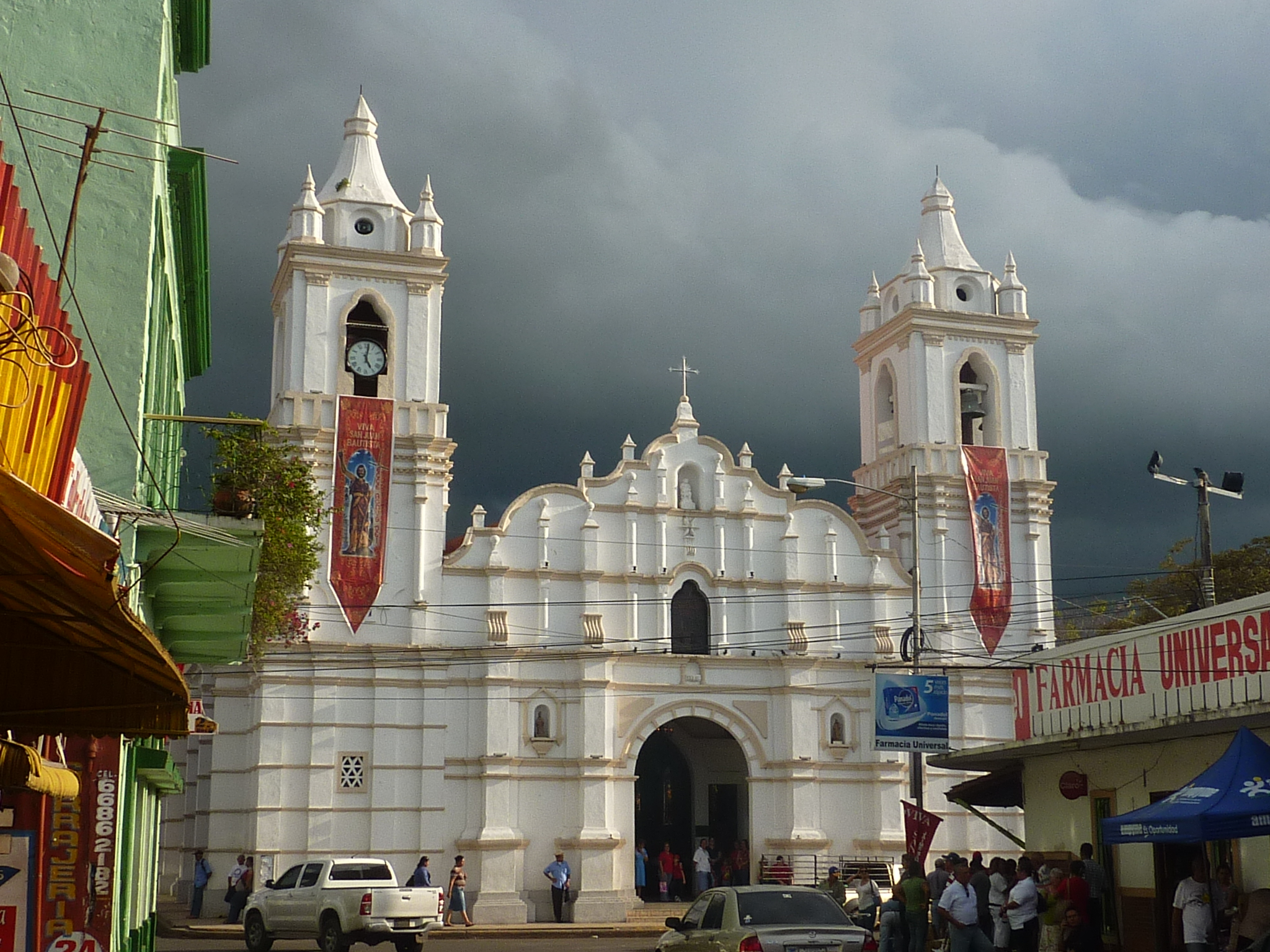
- Cathedral of St. John Baptist

Location
- Country: Panama
- Ecclesiastical province: Province of Panamá
- Metropolitan: Jose Domingo Ulloa Mendieta, O.S.A.

Statistics
- Area: 6,225 km^{2} (2,403 sq mi)
- Population: Total; Catholics: (as of 2006); 189,000; 182,000 (96.3%)
- Parishes: 22

Information
- Denomination: Roman Catholic
- Rite: Roman Rite
- Established: 21 July 1962 (64 years ago)
- Cathedral: Cathedral of St. John Baptist

Current leadership
- Pope: Leo XIV
- Bishop: Rafael Valdivieso Miranda

Map
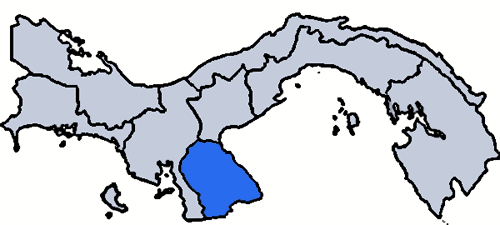

The Roman Catholic Diocese of Chitré (erected 21 July 1962) is a suffragan diocese of the Archdiocese of Panamá. Many churches in the diocese were damaged by earthquakes in 2026.

== Bishops ==
- José María Carrizo Villarreal (1963–1994)
- José Luis Lacunza Maestrojuán, O.A.R. (1994–1999), appointed Bishop of David; future Cardinal
- Fernando Torres Durán (1999–2013)
- Rafael Valdivieso Miranda (since 2013)
- José Domingo Ulloa Mendieta (1983-1988), appointed Auxiliary Bishop of Panamá

== Notable people ==
- Ana Maria Moreno Del Castillo: Laywoman of the diocese declared Servant of God in 2018.

== See also ==
- Catholic Church in Panama
