= San Giuseppe da Copertino =

- Church of Saint Joseph of Cupertino
- Chiesa di San Giuseppe da Copertino
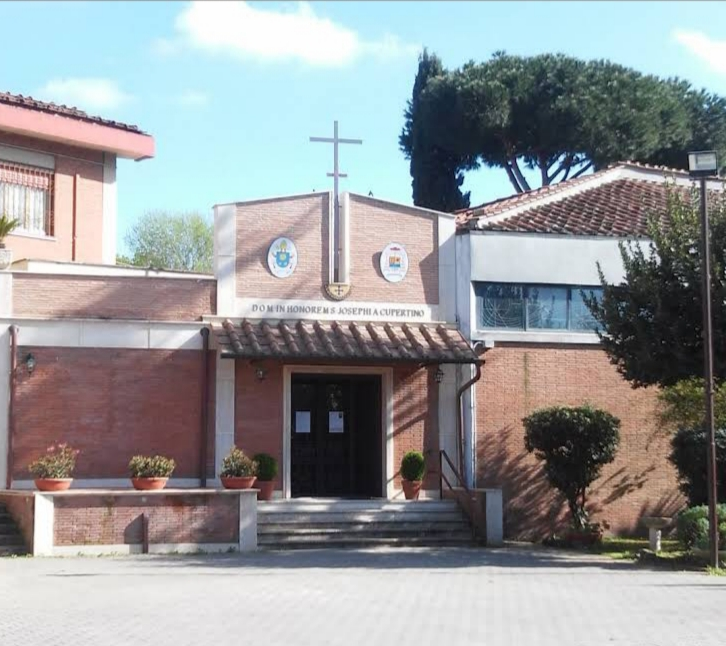

- Location within Rome
- 41°49′00″N 12°29′03″E
- Location: Via dei Genieri 12, Giuliano-Dalmata, Rome
- Country: Italy
- Language: Italian
- Denomination: Catholic
- Tradition: Roman Rite
- Religious order: Order of Friars Minor Conventual (1979–2001)
- Website: sangiuseppedacopertinoroma.it

History
- Status: titular church, parish church
- Dedication: Joseph of Cupertino
- Earlier dedication: Mark the Evangelist
- Consecrated: 1956

Architecture
- Functional status: active
- Architectural type: Modern
- Groundbreaking: 1951
- Completed: 1956

Administration
- Diocese: Rome

San Giuseppe da Copertino is a 20th-century parochial church and titular church in southern Rome, dedicated to Saint Joseph of Cupertino (1603–1663).

== History ==
The church was built in 1951–56, originally as the first parish church of San Marco in Agro Laurentino. A new church on a different site was opened for that parish in 1972, and the old one became a dependency.

The church became a parish church again in 1979, and the dedication changed to Joseph of Cupertino, because the parish had been given to the Order of Friars Minor Conventual. However, they gave it up in 2001 and the parish is now run by diocesan clergy.

On 14 February 2015, Pope Francis made it a titular church to be held by a cardinal-priest.

Cardinal-protectors

- José Luis Lacunza Maestrojuán (2015–present)
