= Fernando Torres Durán =

Panamanian Roman Catholic bishop (1937–2019)

- Bishop of Chitré
- Church: Catholic Church
- Diocese: Diocese of Chitré
- In office: 2 July 1999 – 25 April 2013
- Predecessor: José Luis Lacunza Maestrojuán
- Successor: Rafael Valdivieso Miranda
- Previous posts: Titular Bishop of Abaradira (1996-1999); Auxiliary Bishop of Panamá (1996-1999)

Orders
- Ordination: 16 July 1960
- Consecration: 21 December 1996 by José Dimas Cedeño Delgado

Personal details
- Born: 2 August 1937 Cartago, Valle del Cauca Department, Colombia
- Died: 13 November 2019 (aged 82) Panama City, Panama

Fernando Torres Durán (2 August 1937 – 13 November 2019) was a Panamanian Roman Catholic bishop.

Durán was born in Colombia. He served as titular bishop of Abaradira and as auxiliary bishop of the Roman Catholic Archdiocese of Panamá, Panama from 1996 to 1999. Durán then served as bishop of the Roman Catholic Diocese of Chitré, Panama, from 1999 to 2013.
