= Setifis =

Roman-era town in northeastern Algeria

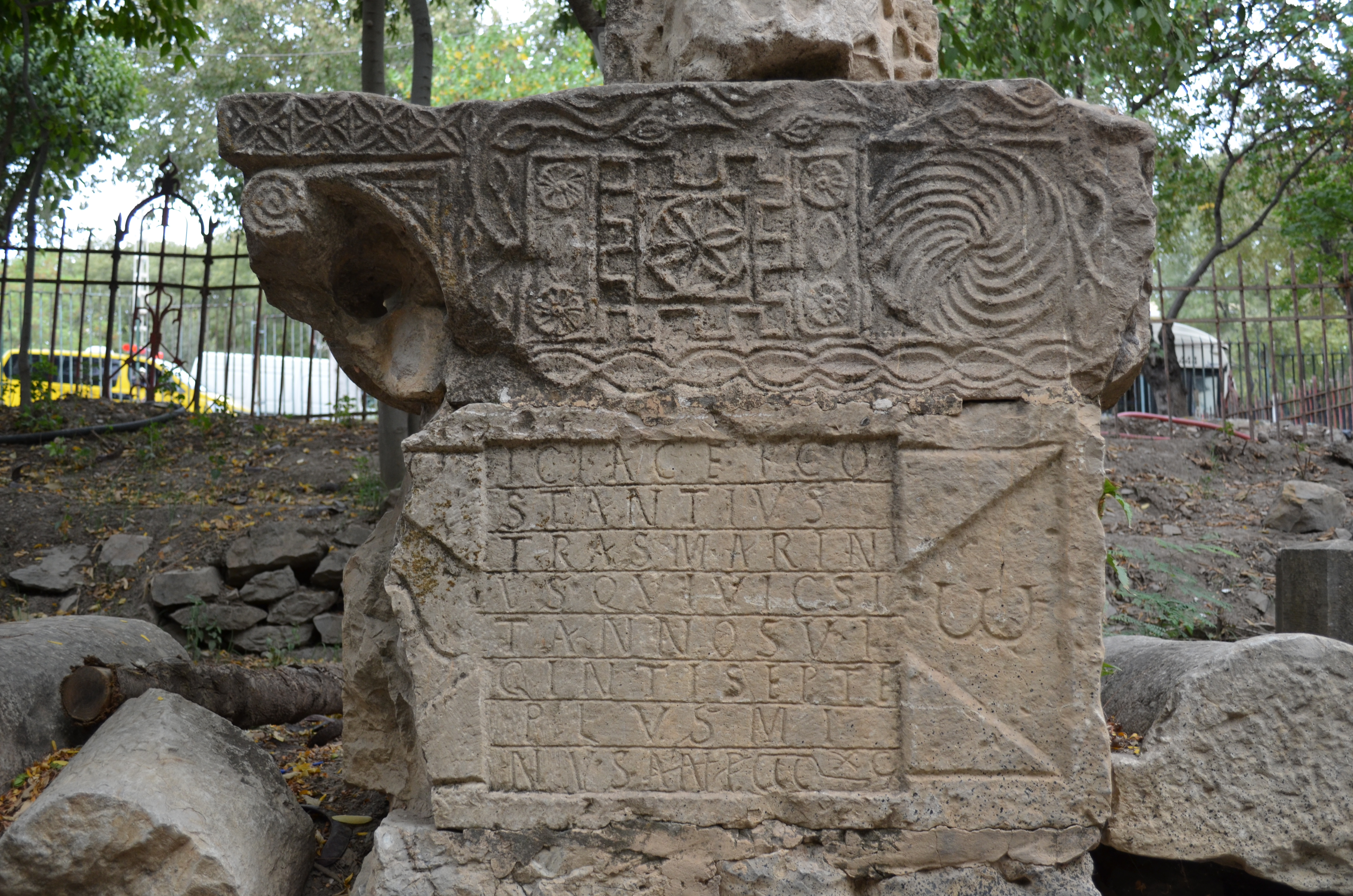
- Roman remains in Sitifis

- Location within Algeria
- 36.183333°N 5.4°E
- Location: Algeria
- Region: Sétif Province

Setifis (Arabic: سطيف; Berber: Sṭif), was a Roman town located in northeastern Algeria. It was the capital of the Roman province called Mauretania Sitifensis, and it is today Sétif in the Sétif Province (Algeria).

== History ==
Sitifis was founded in 97 AD, during the reign of Nerva, as a colony for Roman veterans. Although no buildings of this period are known, a cemetery excavated in the 1960s contained Punic shaft tombs dated to the 2nd century AD. As the town grew, around 297 AD, the province of Mauretania Sitifensis was established, with Sitifis as its capital. In the newly prosperous town a bath building was built, decorated with fine mosaics: its restoration in the fifth century had a cold room (frigidarium) paved with a large mosaic showing the birth of Venus. Setifis initially was populated by Punic people and later by Italian colonists. Inscriptions also indicate a Jewish presence.

Sitifis was officially Colonia Augusta Nerviana Martialis Veteranorum Sitifensium, and from the time of Diocletian, (293 A.D.), was the capital of Mauretania Sitifensis (now eastern Algeria). Today, vestiges of the third century and fourth century include city walls, temple, circus, mausoleum and "Scipio" Byzantine fortress. Numerous archaeological artifacts are exhibited at the archaeological museum of the city.

Although what happened under Vandal rule is not known, the Byzantine reconquest brought with it a major fort, of which parts are still standing. In the sixth century Christianity was the main religion, with a strong presence of Donatism. Under the Vandals it was the chief town of a district called "Zaba". It was still the capital of a province (called "Mauretania Prima") under Byzantine rule and was then a place of strategic importance. The area became a part of Byzantine North Africa in 541, that saw the introduction of Orthodox doctrines to the main Donatist and Catholic towns of their Exarchate of Africa

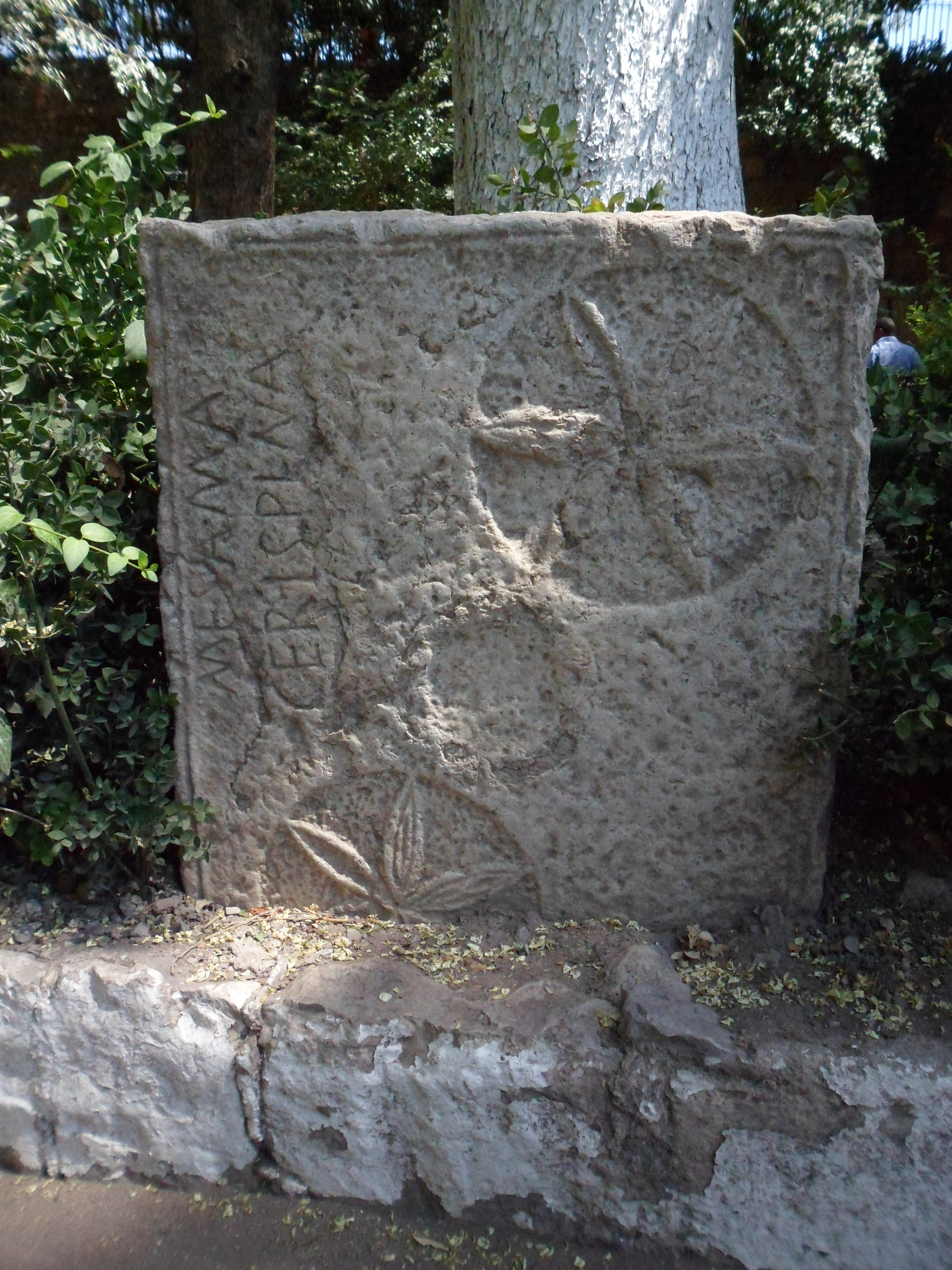
Roman stones with Latin words in Setif gardens

In 647 AD the first Muslim expedition to Africa took place and by the end of this century, the area started to be conquered. Indeed, Uqba ibn Nafi partially destroyed Sitifis in a raid in 680 AD, when his forces conquered nearby Saldae (actual Bougie), while fighting to reach the Atlantic Ocean. The Byzantine era of Sitifis was over. By 702 AD, the area had been fully conquered by the Umayyad Caliphate.

In the eight century the region had been converted to the Islamic faith. We know little of the early Islamic town, but by the tenth century the area outside of the fortress was once more filled with houses: on the site of the Roman baths over twelve of these were excavated, with large courtyards surrounded by long, thin, rooms. In the mid-eleventh century this development stopped abruptly, and a defensive wall was built around the city.

Historian Leo Africanus reports that a major wave of destruction followed the invasion of the Banu Hillal shortly thereafter.

Similar to an army of locusts, they (the Banu Hillal) destroy everything in their path.Ibn Khaldun, a Muslim historian

Nothing more is known of what used to be Roman Setifis until the ruins of the town were used by the French army (who built their own fortress on the site in 1848, using the line of the medieval city wall and the Byzantine fortress). The modern city was founded by the French on the ruins of the ancient one.

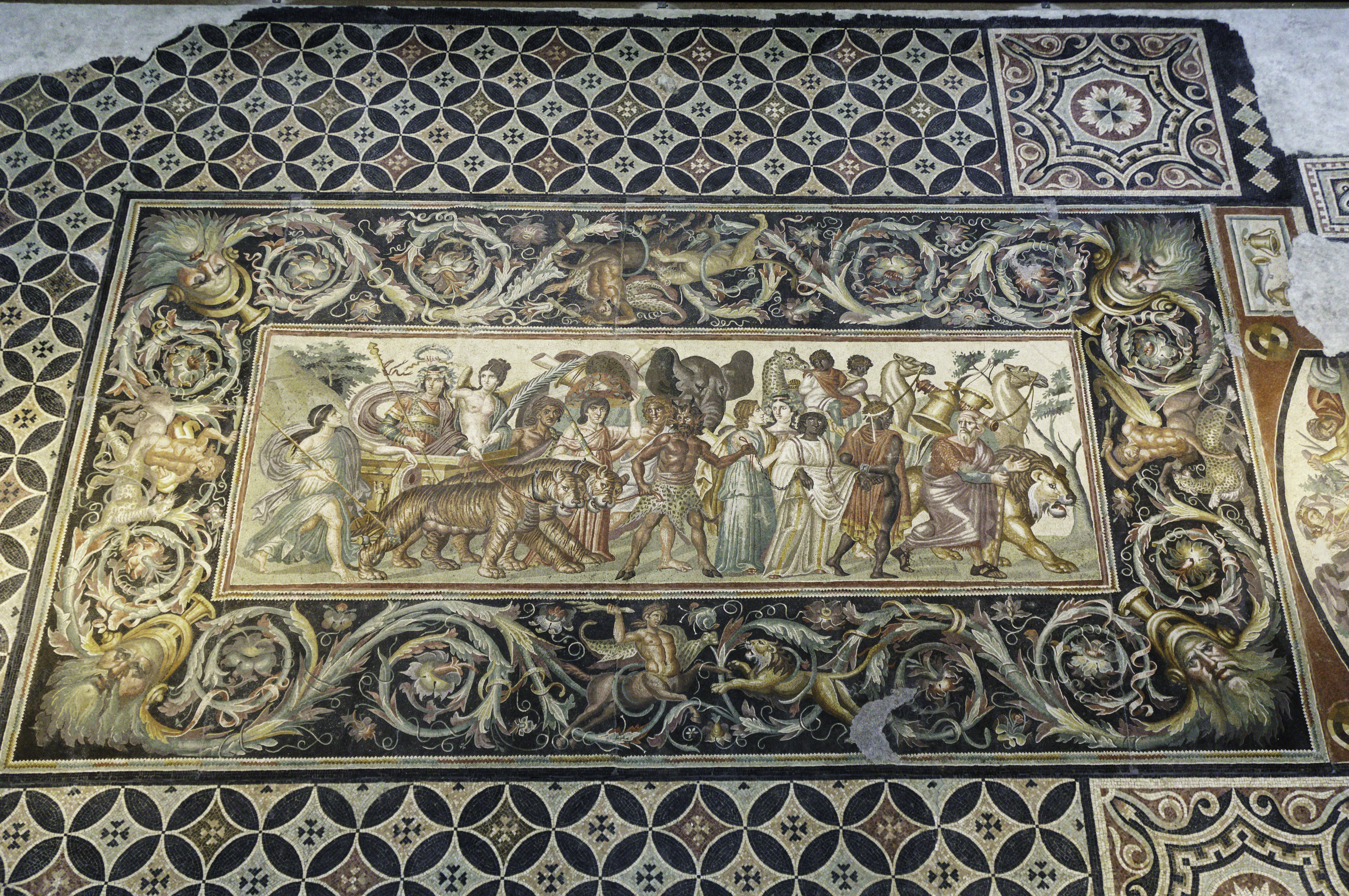
Mosaic from Baths of Roman Setifis (shown in the "Setif Museum")

== Roman architecture ==
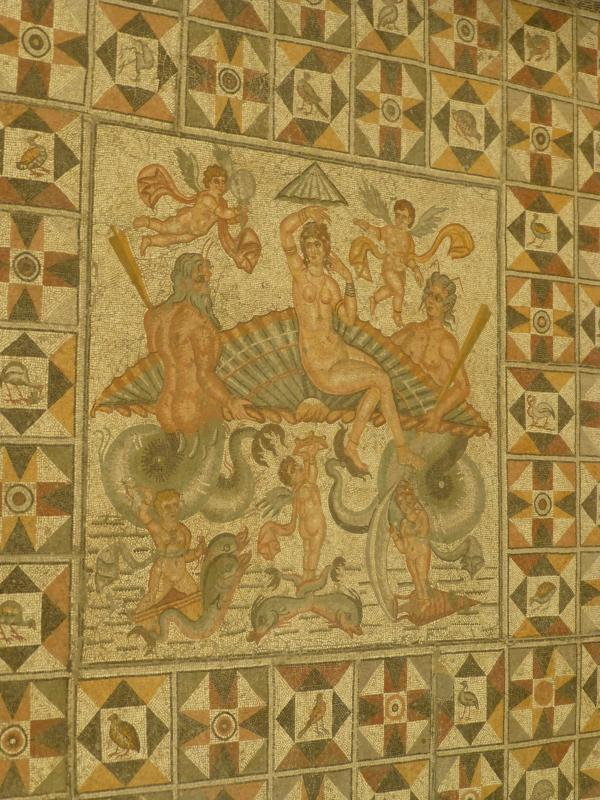
Roman mosaic with Venus, shown in the Setif Museum

On the northwest edge of the town two great Christian basilicas were built at the end of the fourth century, decorated, again, with splendid mosaics, and a Bishopric was founded at this time.

The city had a bath house fortifications The inhabitants made inscriptions to the emperors a practice that falls out in the 4th century with the rise of Christianity.

The city had also a "Circus"; the approximate location confirmed by old air photographs showing 90% of the circus has now been built over;. Only the southern, curved, end remains visible. The U-shaped formerly visible track was 450 m. long and 70 m. wide.

== Bishopric ==
The city was also the center of a bishopric. Saint Augustine, who had frequent relations with Sitifis, tells us that in his day the Bishopric had a monastery and an episcopal school. Several Christian inscriptions have been found there, one of 452 mentioning the relics of Saint Lawrence, another naming two martyrs of Sitifis, Justus and Decurius.The diocese effectively ceased with the Islamic invasion, but remains a titular see to the current day.

Bishops known to us include:

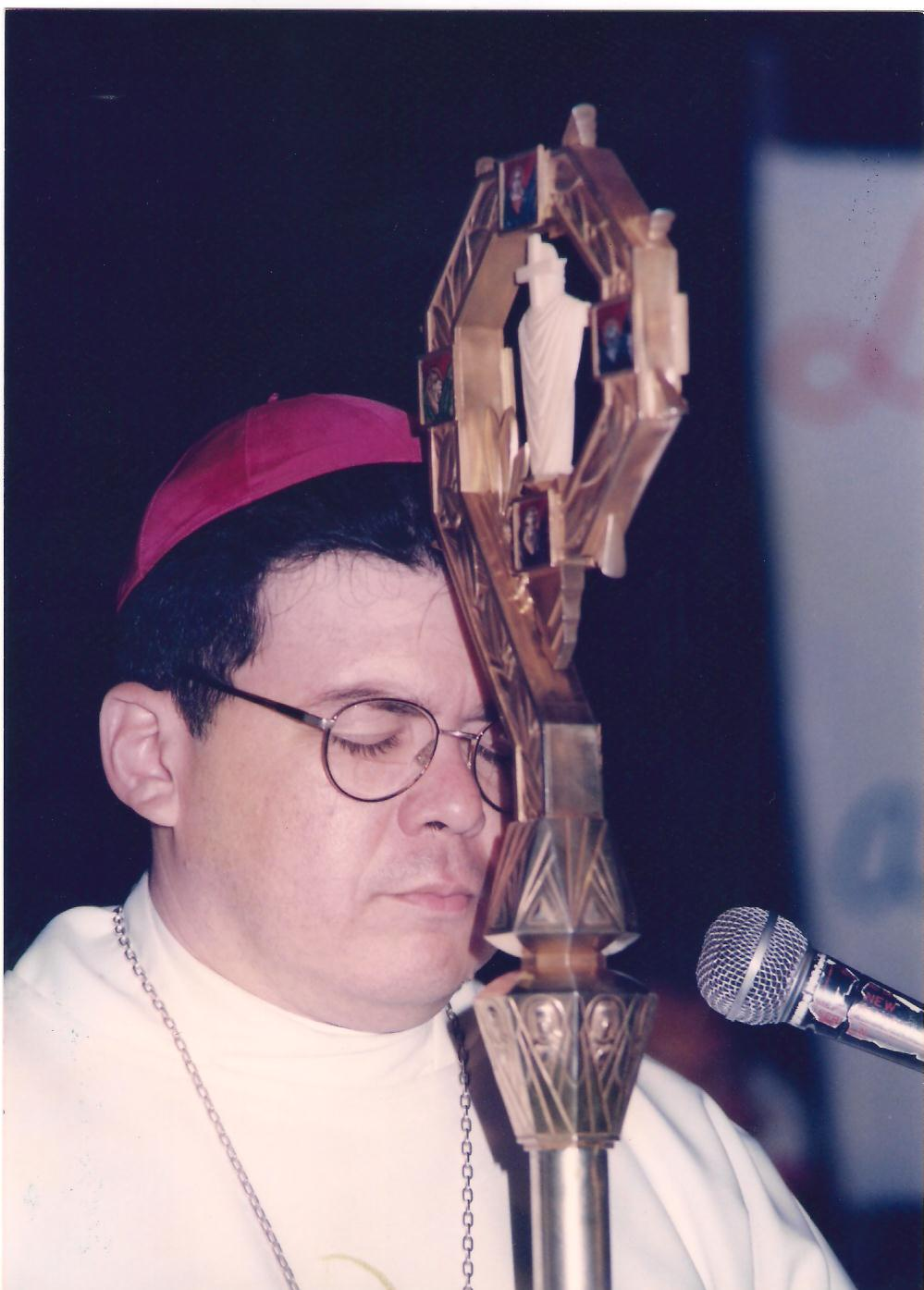
Bishop Sanchez

- Novutus(Donatist)
- Unnamed Donatist bishop
- Lucullas (Catholic)
- Alexis Lemaître, (24 Feb 1911 Appointed - 28 Jul 1920 Appointed, Coadjutor Archbishop of Carthage)
- Joanny Thévenoud, (8 Jul 1921 Appointed - 16 Sep 1949)
- André-Maurice Parenty (9 Mar 1950 Appointed - 23 Nov 1983)
- Armando Xavier Ochoa (23 Dec 1986 Appointed - 1 Apr 1996 Bishop of El Paso, Texas)
- Manuel Felipe Díaz Sánchez (27 Feb 1997 Appointed - 4 Apr 2000 Bishop of Carúpano)
- John Choi Young-su (22 Dec 2000 Appointed - 3 Feb 2006 Appointed, Coadjutor Archbishop of Daegu {Taegu})
- Broderick Soncuaco Pabillo (24 May 2006 Appointed - 29 Jun 2021 Appointed, Vicar Apostolic of Taytay
- Mark Anthony Eckman (5 Nov 2021 Appointed - )

== See also ==
- Mauretania Sitifensis
