= La Villa de los Santos =

La Villa de los Santos La Heroica Villa de Los Santos
- City and corregimiento
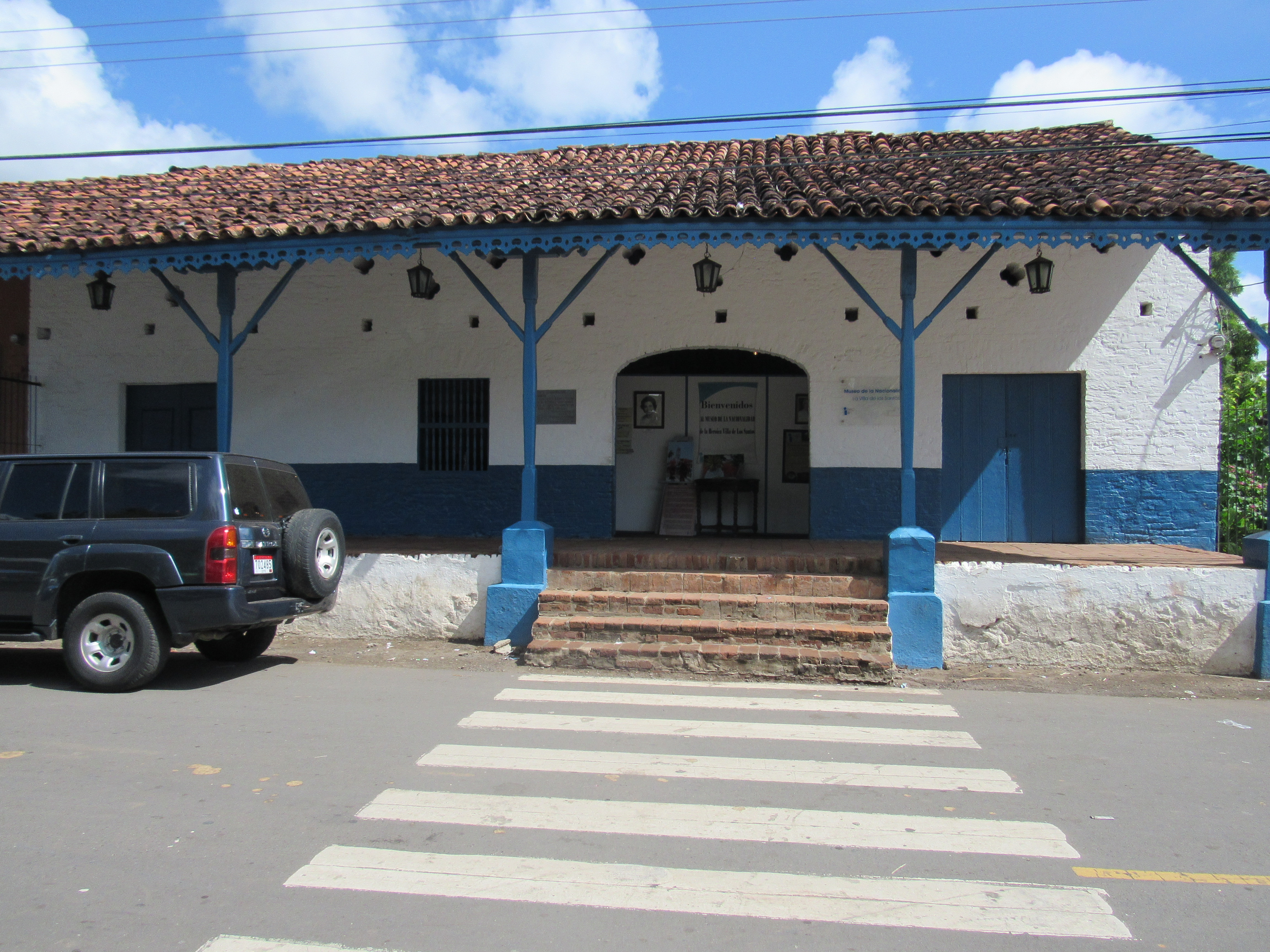

- Flag Coat of arms

- Location within Panama
- Coordinates: 7.967°N 80.400°W
- Country: Panama
- Province: Los Santos
- District: Los Santos
- Established: November 1, 1569

Area
  - Land: 72.9 km^{2} (28.1 sq mi)

Population (2010)
  - Total: 7,991
  - Density: 109.6/km^{2} (284/sq mi)
- Population density calculated based on land area.
- Time zone: UTC−5 (EST)
- Climate: Aw

La Villa de los Santos also known La Heroica Villa de Los Santos, is the capital city and a corregimiento of the Los Santos District of Los Santos Province, Panama. It is at the left edge of La Villa River. Founded as Santa Cruz in 1555 by Juan Rodriguez Monjaraz, the then governor of the region, the city is known for First Cry of Independence and the population's efforts in the movement to separate Panama from Spanish power in November 1821.

A yearly festival is hosted to celebrate the anniversary of the beginning of Panama's war for independence, which started in La Villa de los Santos. José Higinio Durán, the Catholic bishop of Panama, and Julián Chávez, the mayor of the city, were two individuals who called for Panama's independence. According to local tradition, a woman born to slave parents named Rufina Alfaro participated in the occupation of Spanish military outposts in the town, although this is disputed.

It was created by Law 5 of January 19, 1998. Though it is a corregimiento, it is properly called Villa de los Santos rather than Corregimiento de Los Santos. Its population as of 1990 was 6,543; its population as of 2000 was 7,194.

== Climate ==
Climate data for La Villa de Los Santos (2001–2015 normals, extremes 1964–present)
Month	Jan	Feb	Mar	Apr	May	Jun	Jul	Aug	Sep	Oct	Nov	Dec	Year
Record high °C (°F)	35.5 (95.9)	36.6 (97.9)	36.2 (97.2)	37.8 (100.0)	38.3 (100.9)	37.2 (99.0)	36.2 (97.2)	36.2 (97.2)	36.0 (96.8)	36.0 (96.8)	36.0 (96.8)	35.4 (95.7)	38.3 (100.9)
Mean daily maximum °C (°F)	32.6 (90.7)	33.1 (91.6)	33.6 (92.5)	34.2 (93.6)	33.5 (92.3)	32.2 (90.0)	32.0 (89.6)	32.1 (89.8)	32.1 (89.8)	31.6 (88.9)	31.5 (88.7)	32.1 (89.8)	32.6 (90.6)
Daily mean °C (°F)	28.2 (82.8)	28.5 (83.3)	29.0 (84.2)	29.7 (85.5)	29.1 (84.4)	28.2 (82.8)	28.0 (82.4)	27.9 (82.2)	27.9 (82.2)	27.5 (81.5)	27.5 (81.5)	27.8 (82.0)	28.3 (82.9)
Mean daily minimum °C (°F)	23.8 (74.8)	23.9 (75.0)	24.4 (75.9)	25.1 (77.2)	24.7 (76.5)	24.2 (75.6)	24.0 (75.2)	23.8 (74.8)	23.6 (74.5)	23.4 (74.1)	23.4 (74.1)	23.4 (74.1)	24.0 (75.2)
Record low °C (°F)	17.0 (62.6)	17.5 (63.5)	16.7 (62.1)	17.5 (63.5)	17.8 (64.0)	17.2 (63.0)	17.8 (64.0)	17.8 (64.0)	18.3 (64.9)	17.8 (64.0)	16.7 (62.1)	14.4 (57.9)	14.4 (57.9)
Average rainfall mm (inches)	10.2 (0.40)	0.6 (0.02)	3.5 (0.14)	22.1 (0.87)	115.7 (4.56)	137.6 (5.42)	96.6 (3.80)	125.0 (4.92)	160.8 (6.33)	223.2 (8.79)	126.9 (5.00)	44.2 (1.74)	1,066.4 (41.99)
Mean monthly sunshine hours	255.0	244.9	268.7	229.0	162.9	120.7	128.5	131.3	124.1	136.8	154.2	202.5	2,158.6
Percentage possible sunshine	70	73	72	62	42	32	33	34	34	37	44	56	49
Source 1: IMHPA
Source 2: INEC

== See also ==
- Anita Moreno Regional Hospital
