= Jacques Gaillot =

French Catholic bishop (1935–2023)

His Excellency Jacques Gaillot
- Titular Bishop of Parthenia
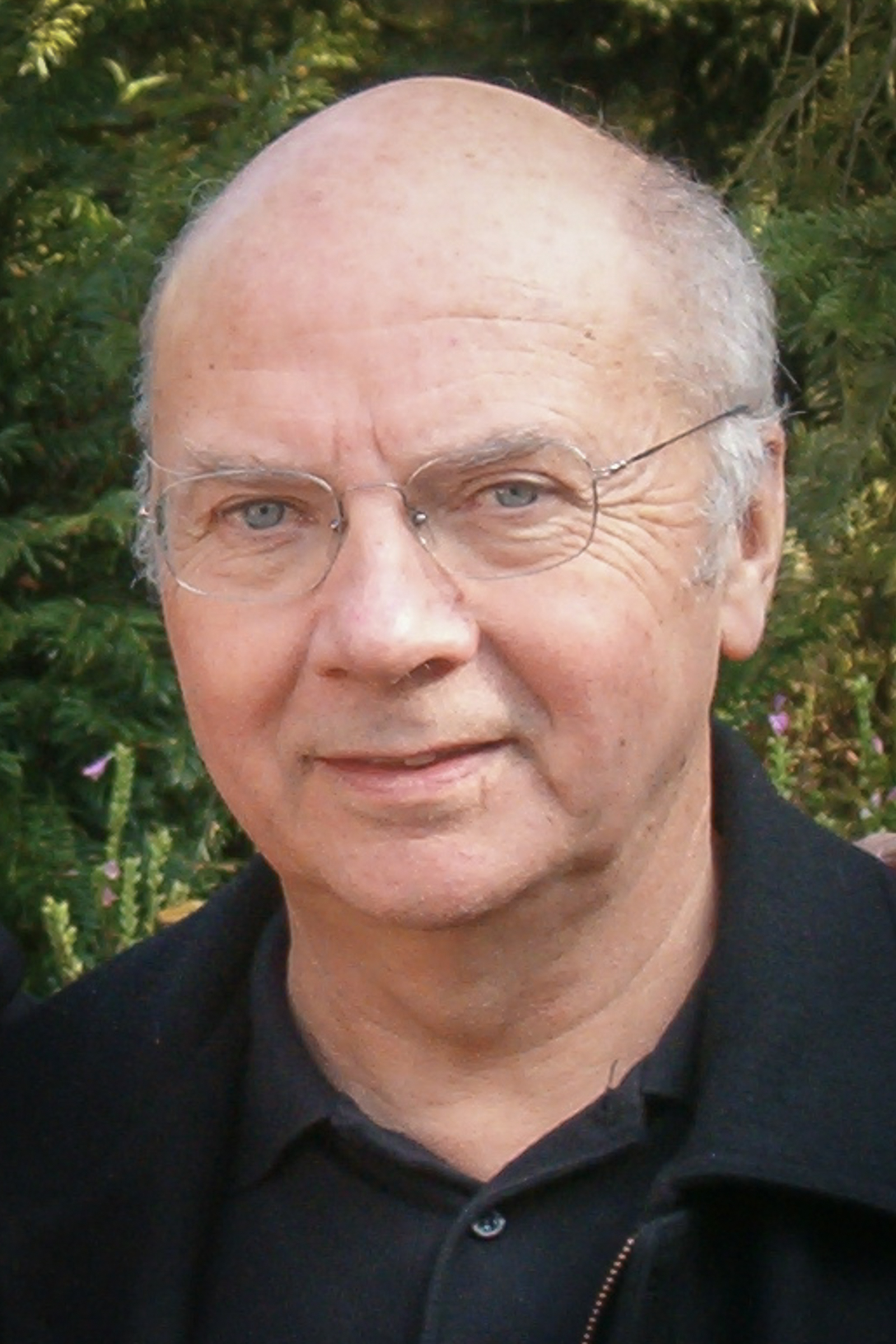
- Gaillot in 2007
- Church: Catholic Church
- See: Partenia
- In office: 1995–2023
- Predecessor: José Luis Lacunza Maestrojuán
- Successor: Vacant
- Previous post: Bishop of Évreux

Orders
- Ordination: 18 March 1961
- Consecration: 20 June 1982 by Léon Aimé Taverdet

Personal details
- Born: 11 September 1935 Saint-Dizier, France
- Died: 12 April 2023 (aged 87) Paris, France

Styles of Jacques Gaillot
- Reference style: The Right Reverend
- Spoken style: Your Excellency
- Religious style: Bishop

Jacques Gaillot (French: [ʒak ɡajo]; 11 September 1935 – 12 April 2023) was a French Catholic clergyman and social activist. He was Bishop of Évreux in France from 1982 to 1995. In 1995, Pope John Paul II removed him as head of his diocese because he publicly expressed controversial and heterodox positions on religious, political, and social matters. These views earned Gaillot the popular nickname "the Red Cleric".

From 1995, Gaillot was bishop of the titular see of Parthenia. His online ministry to dissidents in the Catholic Church under the name Partenia has since been described as the Catholic Church's first virtual diocese.

== Early life and priesthood ==
Jacques Gaillot was born in Saint-Dizier, Haute-Marne, on 11 September 1935. After his secondary studies, he entered the seminary in Langres. From 1957 to 1959, he performed his compulsory military service in Algeria during the Algerian War. From 1960 to 1962 he completed his studies in theology in Rome, earning a bachelor's degree. He was ordained a priest in 1961.

From 1962 to 1964, he studied at the Higher Institute for Liturgy in Paris and taught at the major seminary in Châlons-en-Champagne. Beginning in 1965, he was a professor at the regional seminary of Reims, where he chaired sessions for the implementation of the principles of the Second Vatican Council.

In 1973, he was assigned to the parish of St Dizier in his hometown and became co-manager of the institute for the training of seminary instructors in Paris. In 1977, he was appointed vicar general of the Diocese of Langres. When the see became vacant in 1981, he was elected diocesan administrator.

== Bishop of Évreux ==
On 5 May 1982, Pope John Paul II appointed him Bishop of Évreux. He received his episcopal consecration on 20 June from Léon Aimé Taverdet, Bishop of Langres. In his first Easter message he wrote: "I'm not here to convince the convinced or take care of the well. I'm here to support the ill and offer a hand to the lost. Does a bishop remain in his cathedral or does he go into the street? ... I made my choice."

In 1983, Gaillot publicly supported a conscientious objector in Évreux who declined to perform alternative service in forestry on the grounds that it did not contribute to the relief of the destitute or promote peace. During the annual assembly of the French episcopate, he was one of two bishops (of a total of 110) who voted against a text which supported nuclear deterrence.

In 1984, Gaillot declined to join large-scale Church-led public demonstrations in favour of French parochial schools and signed petitions in favour of secular education.

In January 1985, Gaillot drew sustained media attention for the first time when he signed an appeal on behalf of underpaid Catholic school teachers; also signing the appeal was Georges Marchais, the head of the French Communist Party. In response, conservatives in Gaillot's diocese described him as "a tool of the church's worst enemies", while the right-leaning newspaper Le Figaro spearheaded a campaign against him. Also in 1985, Gaillot supported the First Palestinian Intifada.

In 1987, he went to South Africa to meet a young anti-apartheid militant from Évreux sentenced to four years in prison by the South African régime. There he also appeared at a demonstration where some Communist militants were also demonstrating. In order to accomplish this trip, he had to renounce going with the diocesan pilgrimage to Lourdes, a move that drew criticism. Further, in the same year, he also announced that the French Bishops "remain too preoccupied by the correct functioning of the church and its structures." This only ensured that the responses to Gaillot when he later attacked the right-wing French political party, the National Front, were even stronger. Also in 1987, Gaillot traveled to Athens to show solidarity with Palestinian refugees. Perhaps the most notable event he performed in 1987 was attending, by invitation, a special session of the United Nations in New York to speak out for disarmament.

In 1988, during a closed-door session of the annual assembly of the French episcopate in Lourdes, he advocated the ordination of married men to the priesthood. After the proceedings had finished Gaillot spoke to the press about the discussions held and also promoted his own viewpoints. By promoting a revision of clerical celibacy and the use of condoms, he caused considerable tension with the French bishops' conference, the situation being exacerbated by the fact that in speaking to the media about the session, Gaillot had violated convention regarding assembly conclaves. He later defended his previous actions, remarking that "I never broke the vow of celibacy ... I only questioned it. But that's worse." Also that year, Gaillot took the unprecedented step for a Roman Catholic bishop of blessing a homosexual union in a "service of welcoming," after the couple requested it in view of their imminent death from AIDS.

In 1989, Galliot participated in a trip to French Polynesia organized by the peace movement, asking for the end to French nuclear testing.

Gaillot also participated in the ceremony of the transfer of the ashes of the late bishop Baptiste-Henri Grégoire (1750–1831) to the Panthéon, a necropolis for the great men of France. Grégoire had been instrumental in the first abolition of slavery, and the end of discrimination against Blacks and Jews during the French Revolution. The hierarchy of the Catholic Church had refused to give him the last sacraments because of Grégoire's acceptance of the Civil Constitution of the Clergy. Gaillot was the only French bishop participating in this ceremony.

The French journalist Henri Tincq wrote in Le Monde that Gaillot "has the merit of saying out loud what many people in authority in the church think deep down".

In 1989, the French Bishops' Conference, to the extent that the members of the episcopate voted to censure him after Gaillot gave an interview to the publication Lui, a publication known for its explicit sexual content. He also gave interviews to leading gay magazines and criticized his peers as incompetent to judge the circumstances of gays and lesbians. Gaillot offered to resign but the Vatican did not respond.

Toward late 1989, he made a conciliatory gesture by signing a promise of "loyalty" and "docility" to the papal authority. A week later, Gaillot appeared on television and spoke of the "feeble state of internal debate in the church" and express disappointment that progress had not been made since the Second Vatican Council.

In 1991, he opposed the Gulf War, publishing a book called Open letter to those who preach war, but let it be waged by others. He also condemned the embargo on Iraq. By the end of 1991, the French Bishops' Conference had censured Gaillot three times, most recently for his intervention in Haiti, rousing support for Jean-Bertrand Aristide.

Gaillot's book A Rant on Exclusion (Coup de gueule contre l'exclusion) was published in March 1994. It criticized the French laws on immigration proposed by Minister of the Interior, Charles Pasqua.

On 12 April 1994, Gaillot appeared on television in a discussion with dissident Catholic theologian Eugen Drewermann. On 14 April, Archbishop Joseph Duval, the president of the Bishops Conference of France and Gaillot's superior as metropolitan archbishop of Rouen, wrote to Gaillot: "For all to see you are in solidarity with Drewermann. But how do you show your solidarity with us, your fellow episcopal brothers and the Pope? Are you aware that your position is unsustainable? The distance from your brothers in the episcopate that you emphasize makes us suffer and has become a scandal for many Catholics." Gaillot at one point offered to resign, but withdrew his offer, fearing that the Vatican might resolve his case as it had that of Archbishop Raymond Hunthausen in 1987 by appointing an auxiliary bishop with special authority.

Gaillot was the target of a bitter campaign to disparage his name. Unsubstantiated allegations of homosexuality, racism, anti-Semitism, and psychosis and neurosis were made by highly placed authorities in the French hierarchy. Gaillot responded by calling Duval an "ayatollah" seeking to impose "ideological uniformity" within the French Bishops Conference. He compared the leadership style of Cardinal Bernadin Gantin, head of the Vatican's Congregation for Bishops, to that of the Stasi, the East German security police.

=== Sexual abuse ===
In 1988, Jacques Gaillot received into his diocese the Québécois priest Denis Vadeboncœur, who had been sentenced to twenty months in prison in Québec in 1985 for multiple counts of sexual abuse of minors. Gaillot assigned him as a pastor in Lieurey, putting him in contact with children again. Following a new charge, Vadeboncœur was sentenced in 2005 to twelve years in prison for raping a minor. Gaillot, after having claimed in 1988 that he was ignorant of Vadeboncœur's history, ultimately admitted that he had in fact been informed: "We are doing you a favor. We asked you to accept this undesirable priest and you accepted him. What I did over twenty years ago was an error."

== Removal from Évreux ==
Gantin summoned Gaillot to a meeting at the Vatican on 13 January 1995 and offered the choice of resigning his see or being removed from his office. Gaillot returned to France and issued a statement that said: "I was asked to hand in my resignation, which I thought I had good reasons to refuse." Having refused to resign, he was removed and denied the use of the title "bishop emeritus". As all bishops need to be assigned to a see (diocese), he was assigned the titular see of Parthenia on 13 January 1995.

The Church named two bishops to stay in contact with Gaillot.

=== Reaction to removal ===
This removal sparked an emotional response from thousands of people across France and the rest of the world. Twenty thousand people gathered outside the cathedral in Évreux when he offered his last Mass there on 22 January. Four French bishops demonstrated their support by attending the service, where Gaillot said: "This should be a Church of the marginalised, not a Church that marginalises." The crowd stayed on the streets protesting the Vatican's decision. Protestors united under the leadership of the Communist mayor of the region and marched through the streets in the rain. Although still a bishop he left his cross, mitre and staff behind in Évreux.

The decision to remove Gaillot as ordinary of Évreux was widely seen as a mistake by both lay people and clergy, and also by many non-religious people who had come to view Gaillot favorably. After his removal, a reported forty thousand people wrote letters to the cathedral office at Évreux, with more being sent to the Vatican and eminent prelates. He was perceived favorably by a significant number of people, particularly due to his ministry to all people without distinction. In addition, he had become a national figure after the sanctions taken against him.

Polls taken at the time consistently revealed the French public to be against the punishment brought upon Gaillot. One CSA survey showed that total of 64 percent of the public was against the firing of Jacques Gaillot as bishop of Évreux, with only 11 percent approving of his firing and the remaining 25 percent being undecided. Some later polls showed that support for Gaillot might even have been as high as 75 percent.

Reactions from other French bishops varied. No French bishop expressed public support for Gaillot, but the spokesperson for the hierarchy reported that both Cardinal Robert-Joseph Coffy of Marseille and Archbishop Duval were "visibly troubled" by the Vatican's action. Duval released a statement that said: "I pleaded for patience in Rome." Duval later said that he "regretted" what Rome had done and called it "an authoritarian act which cannot be accepted by society, even if it is carried out by the Church."

The Archbishop of Cambrai, Jacques Delaporte, defended Gaillot and called his removal "a wound for our church... a source of misunderstanding for the poor and for all those who seek the truth and who put their trust in the church."

By the time he left his position in Évreux, he had visited more prisons than any bishop in France's history.

== After Évreux ==
After being removed from his position as prelate of Évreux, Gaillot wrote:

I had a dream: to be able to accompany the poor, the excluded, the ignored, without having to explain myself or justify myself to the rich, the secure, or the comfortable. To be able to go where distress calls me without having to give advance notice. To be able to show my indignation at destitution, injustice, violence, the sale of weapons, and managed famines without being considered a meddler in politics. I dreamed of being able to live my faith within the church, but also in society, in my time and with my times. I dreamed of the freedom to think and express myself, to debate and criticize, without fear of the guillotine. I dreamed of being different within the unity of faith, and remaining myself, alone and yet in solidarity with others. Ultimately, I hoped to be able to proclaim a Gospel of freedom without being marginalized.

— Jacques Gaillot, Voice from the Desert

After leaving the Bishop's Palace, Gaillot immediately moved in with illegal squatters in Paris' infamous Rue de Dragon. Since then he had shown similar solidarity with the homeless. Bishop Gaillot continued to defend human rights and engage in activism, regularly publishing information about his activities on the website of Parthenia.

Gaillot remained active as a pastor to the excluded. He also travelled throughout France and also internationally, spreading the word of the Christian Gospel and defending those who are considered "outcasts" (namely immigrants). He was an avid anti-war protester and is considered by many to be a strong socialist. Gaillot had a strong friendship with Abbé Pierre.

In 1995, after his removal as Bishop of Évreux, Gaillot attended a Call to Action conference in Detroit as one of the keynote speakers. He held three sessions, proving to be popular despite speaking through a translator. He hosted the conference alongside other controversial Catholic theologians including Hans Küng and Thomas Gumbleton.

Free of responsibility for a functioning diocese, Gaillot became even more daring in his activism. In July 1995, Gaillot engaged in protests against French nuclear testing at Mururoa Atoll in the Tuamotu Archipelago of French Polynesia. Aboard the Greenpeace vessel Rainbow Warrior, part of a fleet of protest ships, he was removed from the ship along with its other protestors and journalists by French commandos, after the Rainbow Warrior sailed within the exclusion zone, and escorted back to the atoll.

Twice bishops prohibited Gaillot from speaking in their dioceses. In 2000, Pope John Paul II forbade his participation in a conference in Rome about religion and homosexuals. Cardinal Joachim Meisner of Cologne prohibited Gaillot from addressing a World Youth Day event in Bonn in 2004.

Also in 2004 Bishop Gaillot met with Maryam Rajavi, an Iranian political activist president-elect of the National Council of Resistance of Iran. Gaillot strongly criticized the actions of some extremist religious leaders in Iran, going on to comment that "One must not forget that the strength of truth will make it [the Iranian resistance] triumphant. Darkness will give way and truth will prevail despite all the lies and ruses". Rajavi publicly thanked the bishop and expressed that his support had been very effective in promoting the cause of the Iran resistance.

Gaillot also took the position as a well-known public figure in France, fighting for a number of causes; Gaillot served as the co-chairman of one of France's foremost human rights activist groups, 'Droits devant !!' (Rights First), among other groups.

In 2007 Gaillot posted a video interview on Google Video, attempting to bring attention to the escalating violence in Darfur.

He wrote a book shortly after his removal from Évreux, which was published in 1996 and titled Voice from the Desert: A Bishop's Cry for a New Church (English translation). It is a largely autobiographical discussion of the events surrounding his removal.

== Reconciliation with Church authorities ==
In 2000, Louis-Marie Billé, Archbishop of Lyon and president of the French Episcopal Conference, invited Gaillot to attend a national ecumenical service in Lyon on 14 May alongside other senior members of the French hierarchy. Billé said the invitation came from the bishops as a group: "It is important that Catholics, and public opinion in general, are aware that the communion that links us as brothers is real, even when it is lived out in a special fashion. What happened five years ago remains a wound even for those who don't necessarily share Mgr Gaillot's opinions." There was no indication that the pope or anyone in the Roman Curia was involved. Gaillot accepted, writing that he was "happy to demonstrate my communion with the Church".

On 1 September 2015, shortly before his 80th birthday, Gaillot, accompanied by Daniel Duigou, a priest and former journalist, met privately with Pope Francis in his Vatican City residence for 45 minutes. Gaillot said the pontiff encouraged him to continue his activism on behalf of migrants and refugees. After the meeting, Gaillot said he was "in love" with Francis.

== Death ==
Gaillot moved to a retirement home in Paris in November 2022. He died in Paris on 12 April 2023, at the age of 87. He suffered from pancreatic cancer and had been hospitalized a week earlier.

== See also ==
- Abbé Pierre
- Call to Action

== Bibliography ==
- Christophe Wargny: Die Welt schreit auf, die Kirche flüstert. Jacques Gaillot, ein Bischof fordert heraus. Herder, Freiburg 1993, ISBN 978-3451230752 (de)
- Christophe Wargny: Jacques Gaillot : Biographie, Syros, 1 April 1995, ISBN 978-2841461899 (fr)
- Jean-Marie Muller: Guy Riobé, Jacques Gaillot : Portraits croisés. Desclée de Brouwer, 1 May 1996, ISBN 978-2220038018 (fr)
- Pierre Pierrard: A nous la parole : Partenia, dix ans. Harmattan 17 October 2012, Kindle Edition, ASIN B00814BKFQ (fr)

| Preceded by Jean Marcel Honoré | Bishop of Évreux; 1982–1995 | Succeeded by Jacques David |
| Preceded by José Luis Lacunza Maestrojuán | Titular Bishop of Partenia; 1995–2023 | Succeeded by Vacant |
| Preceded by New post | Chairman of Droits Devant; 1996–2023 | Succeeded by Vacant |
