= Chênex =

Chênex Shéné (Arpitan)
- Commune
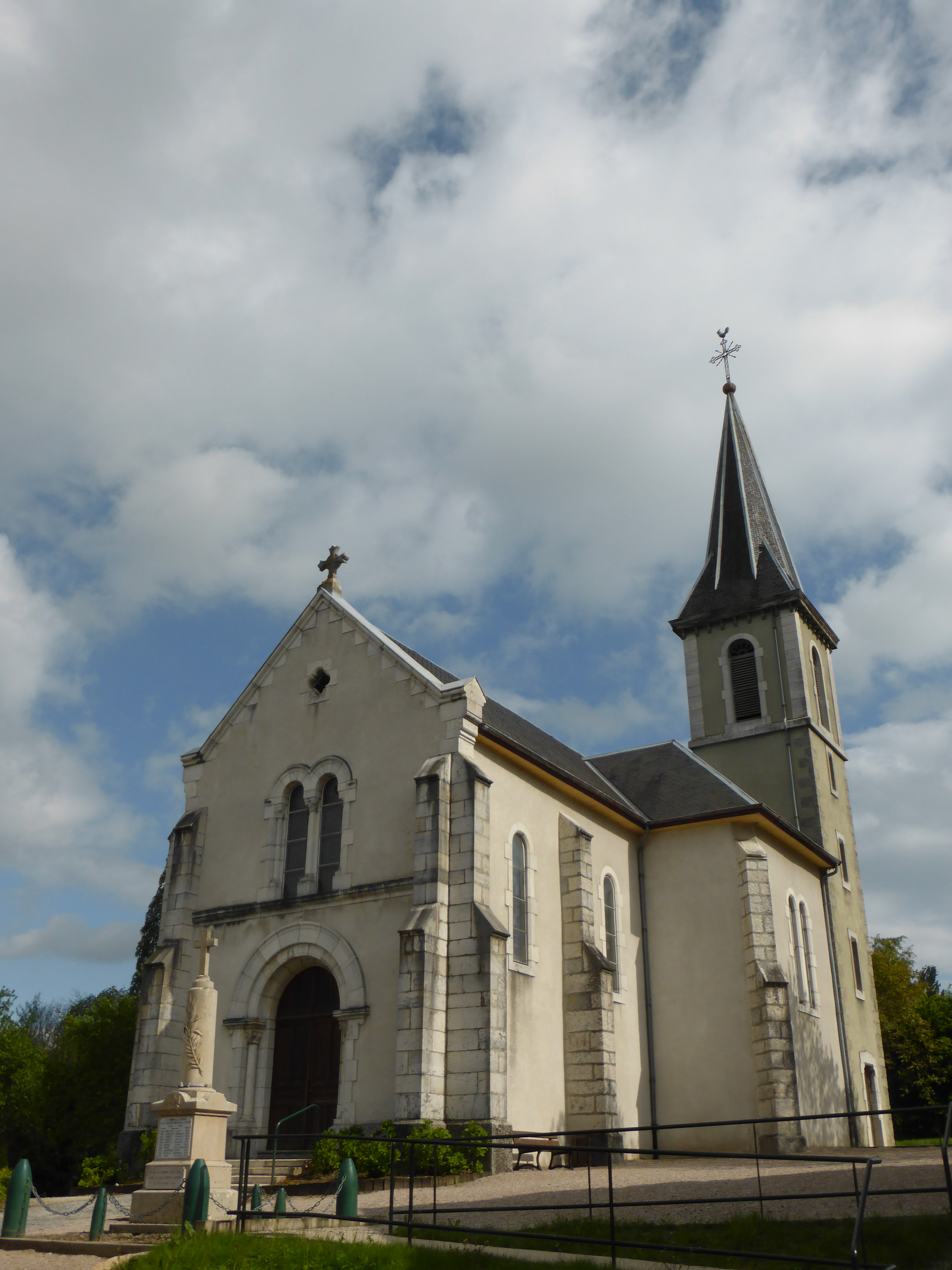
- The church in Chênex

- Coat of arms
- Location of Chênex
- Location within France Location within Auvergne-Rhône-Alpes
- Coordinates: 46°06′21″N 5°59′45″E
- Country: France
- Region: Auvergne-Rhône-Alpes
- Department: Haute-Savoie
- Arrondissement: Saint-Julien-en-Genevois
- Canton: Saint-Julien-en-Genevois
- Intercommunality: Genevois

Government
  - Mayor (2020–2026): Pierre-Jean Crastes
- Area^{1}: 5.38 km^{2} (2.08 sq mi)
- Highest elevation: 724 m (2,375 ft)
- Lowest elevation: 436 m (1,430 ft)
- Population (2023): 791
  - Density: 147/km^{2} (381/sq mi)
- Time zone: UTC+01:00 (CET)
  - Summer (DST): UTC+02:00 (CEST)
- INSEE/Postal code: 74069 /74520
- ^{1} French Land Register data, which excludes lakes, ponds, glaciers > 1 km^{2} (0.386 sq mi or 247 acres) and river estuaries.

Chênex (Arpitan: Shéné) is a commune in the Haute-Savoie department in the Auvergne-Rhône-Alpes region in south-eastern France.

== See also ==
- Communes of the Haute-Savoie department
