= Anita Moreno Regional Hospital =

Hospital in Panama

The Anita Moreno Regional Hospital at La Villa de Los Santos
- Ministerio de Salud de Panamá

Geography
- Location: La Villa de los Santos, Los Santos, Panama
- Coordinates: 7.92443°N 80.39400°W

Organisation
- Care system: National Health Service
- Type: District General

Services
- Emergency department: Yes
- Beds: 257

History
- Founded: 1955

Anita Moreno Regional Hospital is a medium district general hospital near La Villa de Los Santos, Los Santos Province, Panama, run by the Ministerio de Salud. The hospital is located north-west of the village of El Ejido on Belisario Porras Road.

The hospital is under expansion by IBT Group on the site of the previous hospital at a cost of £102.9 million. Building work was started in the year 2012.

== Location ==
The hospital is located on Belisario Porras Road, around 2.7 kilometres (1.7 mi) to the south-east of La Villa de Los Santos, close to El Ejido. It is surrounded by woodland on two sides.

== History ==
The hospital was built on the site of what was originally a potrero that belonged to Anita Moreno. The site became a hospital in 1970, occupying 2 hectares of a 10 hectares lot.

== New hospital ==
The new hospital will replace both the psychiatric hospital and the specialty hospital. It has 257 beds and provides a full range of clinical services including an Accident and Emergency department. The new hospital is expected to have 257 beds and will cover a population of 100,000 inhabitants in the Azuero region. Due to construction delays, the hospital will not be completed until 2019; it will be the only level 3 or 4 hospital in the region.

== See also ==
- Los Santos Province
