= Titular see =

Episcopal see of a former diocese

In various churches, a titular see is an episcopal see of a former diocese that no longer functions, sometimes called a "dead diocese". The ordinary or hierarch of such a see may be styled a "titular metropolitan" (highest rank), "titular archbishop" (intermediary rank) or "titular bishop" (lowest rank), which normally goes by the status conferred on the titular see.

Titular sees are dioceses that no longer functionally exist, often because the territory was conquered by Muslims or because it is schismatic. The Greek–Turkish population exchange of 1923 also contributed to titular sees. The see of Maximianoupolis along with the town that shared its name was destroyed by the Bulgarians under Emperor Kaloyan in 1207; the town and the see were under the control of the Latin Empire, which took Constantinople during the Fourth Crusade in 1204. Parthenia, in north Africa, was abandoned and swallowed by desert sand.

== Catholic Church ==
During the Muslim conquests of the Middle East and North Africa, some bishops fled to Christian-ruled areas. Even if they did not return and the Christian population of their dioceses dispersed, were killed or abandoned the Catholic faith, they continued to be seen as the bishops of those dioceses, who could give rise, even after long interruption (exile and/or vacancy), to a 'restored' line of apostolic succession on each see.

The Ordinary or hierarch of a Catholic titular see may be styled a "Titular Metropolitan" (highest rank), "Titular Archbishop" (intermediary rank) or "titular bishop" (lowest rank), which normally goes by the status conferred on the titular see (mostly corresponding to its historical rank), but exceptions ad hoc are currently made on a regular basis, either above or below the titular see's rank, while titular sees have repeatedly been promoted or demoted.

There are practical advantages in certain circumstances in not establishing a permanent diocese in a given territory, for reasons of the limited size of the Catholic population, its lack of permanence, the likelihood of having to divide the jurisdiction in the near future, and so on. In these circumstances the Catholic Church establishes sometimes not a diocese but a canonical jurisdiction of another kind. This may be, for example, a Mission sui iuris, an Apostolic Administration (permanently constituted), an Ordinariate, a Prefecture Apostolic, a territorial Abbey, a Vicariate Apostolic, or a Prelature. The ecclesiastic placed in charge of one of these jurisdictions has a corresponding title, such as Superior of a Mission sui iuris, Apostolic Administrator, Ordinary, Prefect Apostolic, territorial Abbot, Vicar Apostolic, or Prelate. The ecclesiastic may be in priestly or episcopal orders. In recent practice an Apostolic Administrator, Vicar Apostolic, or Prelate (in this precise sense) is often appointed (and consecrated) a bishop. If that happens he is assigned a titular see, in addition to his status as head of the territorial jurisdiction. the appointment as bishop is less likely in the case of a Superior of a Mission sui iuris, or a Prefect Apostolic, but may happen, especially when a man who is already a bishop governing a particular jurisdiction is appointed cumulatively to govern one of these others. A particular territory may have its canonical status changed more than once, or may be united to a neighbouring territory or subdivided, according to developing circumstances. An example might be the uniting on November 30, 1987, of two Egyptian vicariates apostolic, Heliopolis of Egypt and Port Said, to become the single Vicariate Apostolic of Alexandria of Egypt–Heliopolis of Egypt–Port Said, governed by Egypt's only Latin Ordinary at present. A different example would be the division, on 6 July 6, 1992, of the Ghanaian diocese of Accra, to separate from its territory the new diocese of Koforidua. At the same date, the diocese of Accra became a Metropolitan Archdiocese.

After a name change, an abandoned name may be 'restored' as a titular see, even though a residential successor see exist(ed). Furthermore, the Catholic Church may create more than one titular see named after a single city, by creating one or more lines of apostolic succession assigned to the Latin and/or one or more Eastern Catholic rites, which are not necessarily of the same rank.

It was formerly the practice to add the term in partibus infidelium, often shortened to in partibus or i.p.i., meaning "in the lands of the unbelievers", to the name of the see conferred on titular (non-diocesan) Latin Church bishops. Formerly, when bishops fled from invading Muslims, they were welcomed by other churches, while preserving their titles and their rights to their own dioceses. They were entrusted with the administration of vacant sees of other dioceses, or with assisting in such government of a see which already had a residential bishop. In later days it was deemed fitting to preserve the memory of ancient Christian churches which no longer existed; this was done by giving their names to auxiliary bishops or bishops in missionary countries. These bishops did not reside in the sees whose titles they bore, nor could they exercise any power over them, and are not entrusted with their care. They are therefore called titular bishops, as opposed to diocesan bishops, and the sees themselves are called titular sees, as opposed to residential sees.

The regular appointment of titular bishops is said to date back to the time of the Fifth Lateran Council, in 1514; cardinals alone were authorized to ask for titular bishops to be appointed to assist them in their dioceses. Pope Pius V extended the privilege to all sees in which it had become customary to have auxiliary bishops. Since then the practice has become more widespread.

Although the normal constitution of the hierarchy has always been built on the idea of local jurisdiction of the bishops, there are indications, in the early history of the Church, of many who did not enjoy what is usually called ordinary jurisdiction. Besides those who were endowed with the episcopal character, in order to assist the local bishops there were those who had been driven from their dioceses by infidels or by heretics, or who for other reasons could not reside in the places to which they had been appointed. The spread of Islam through Muslim conquests in Asia and Africa was responsible for hundreds of abandoned sees. During the Crusades, the Latins, who established new Christian communities, composed of Europeans and belonging to the Latin Church, procured the erection of new dioceses for their benefit, and these in turn, during the growth of the Ottoman Empire, increased the number of abandoned sees. The final development of the list of sees, called in partibus infidelium, took shape, at first, from the attempt of the Holy See to keep up the succession of bishops in these dioceses, in the hope of reconquering their territory from the infidel. When all hope of such redemption was given up, these titles were still conferred on those who were chosen to assist the diocesan bishops in their labors. After the 14th century the large increase of population in the great centers rendered such assistance particularly necessary. In the 16th century the Holy See inaugurated the policy of consecrating nuncios and other prelates, delegated to represent the Pope in his relations with the different nations, so that they would be equals with the diocesan bishops of the countries in which they were ambassadors.

The foundation of the Congregation for the Propagation of the Faith, in 1622, gave a great impetus to the missionary work of the Church in China and Japan, and elsewhere a great increase in the number of bishops became necessary and those received their titles from the ancient abandoned sees.

Only about 1850, was any attempt made to compile a list of such sees. Gaetano Moroni had already, in 1840, began publication of his 103 volume Dizionario di erudizione storico-ecclesiastica with a separate six volume index. Moroni acknowledged the great difficulties in compiling this work, even after he thoroughly examined all the sources available to him.

In 1851, the Annuario Pontificio began to have such a list, but it did not purport to be complete. On the contrary, it contained only those that were in general use. Names of dioceses disappeared and were listed again when the titles were actually assigned.

Until 1882, these titles were given as in partibus infidelium. According to Corrigan, the story goes that King George I of Greece (a Lutheran) complained to Pope Leo XIII that he and his (mostly Eastern Orthodox) people were injured by this appellation, saying to Leo XIII, "we are not infidels, we are Christians; we are Catholics." Leo XIII, through a Congregation for the Propagation of the Faith decree, in 1882, abolished the phrase in partibus infidelium and ordered that future appointments should be made as "titular bishops". The custom, when Boudinhon wrote his article, was to join to the name of the see that of the district to which it formerly belonged, or else merely to say "titular bishop".

The Annuaire Pontifical Catholique published a very complete list of the titular sees and titular bishops. Although it did not claim to be perfect, it contained the names of the sees and the bishops who had held the titles as far back, in some cases, as the 14th century.

Titular sees, according to Corrigan in 1920, were conferred on

- Cardinals, who, being only priests, were promoted in Curia to be bishops.
- Nuncios, apostolic delegates and other dignitaries of the Curia, unless they were already diocesan bishops, and under the 1920 custom they were, in that case, translated to titular archbishoprics.
- Coadjutors and Auxiliary bishops.
- Apostolic vicars and, sometimes, on Apostolic prefects in missionary countries.
- Bishops who resign their dioceses, although this was not always done. Sometimes the Holy See refused to do so, and sometimes the bishops did not want it.

In the context of improved relations with the Eastern Orthodox Church and Oriental Orthodoxy after the Second Vatican Council, the Holy See, while continuing to appoint bishops to titular sees in North Africa, ceased to make such appointments to sees that were historically part of the Eastern patriarchates of Constantinople, Alexandria, Antioch, and Jerusalem. It began instead to treat as titular sees also those Catholic dioceses in any country no longer used as titles of diocesan bishops because of having been absorbed into other dioceses or having been renamed due to a change of the bishop's place of residence. For example, several of the sees added by this change of policy are in the western and central United States, such as Grass Valley, California, whose diocese was dissolved upon the erection of the Diocese of Sacramento. The change of practice is reflected in the inclusion from then on of such sees in the official lists of titular sees in editions of the Annuario Pontificio.

Previously, titular sees were routinely (yet not always) assigned not only to auxiliary bishops, similar pseudo-diocesan offices and pre-diocesan apostolic vicars or (Eastern Catholic) apostolic exarchs (not apostolic prefects), but also to retired bishops by way of emeritate (sometimes with a 'promotion' from a suffragan see to an archiepiscopal titular see; however sometimes transferred to another during an incumbent emeritus bishop's life) and even to coadjutor bishops. That practice was largely replaced for the last categories by the present one of referring to a retired bishop as a bishop emeritus of the see that he held, and to a coadjutor bishop simply as coadjutor bishop of the see to which he has been appointed. This change too is reflected in editions of the Annuario Pontificio of the period, which include information on renunciation by retired and coadjutor bishops of titular sees to which they had been appointed.

In 1995, when Jacques Gaillot, Bishop of the Diocese of Évreux, who was controversial for his positions on religious, political and social matters, refused to retire and become Bishop Emeritus of Évreux, he was transferred to the titular see of Partenia.

=== Crusader see-in-exile titles ===
The crusading William IV, Count of Nevers, dying in the Holy Land in 1168, left the building known as the Hospital of Panthenor in the town of Clamecy in Burgundy, together with some land, to the Bishops of Bethlehem, in case Bethlehem should fall under Muslim control. After Saladin took Bethlehem in 1187, the Bishop took up residence in 1223 in his property, which remained the seat of titular Bishops of Bethlehem for almost 600 years, until the French Revolution of 1789.

The Roman Catholic Archbishopric of Nazareth first had two centuries of Metropolitan Archbishops of Nazareth in Barletta (southern Italy), and gave rise in the 19th century to two separately 'restored' titular successor sees: a Latin titular archbishopric of Nazareth and a Maronite (Antiochian Rite) titular (Arch)bishopric of Nazareth, both suppressed only in the early 20th century.

== Eastern and Oriental Orthodoxy ==
The granting of titular sees is occasionally practised in the Eastern and other Orthodox churches.

== Titular episcopal sees in the Aegean ==
The Catholic Church lists several titular sees in the Aegean Islands.

Ancient episcopal sees of the Roman province of Insulae (the Aegean Islands) listed in the Annuario Pontificio as titular sees :

- Astypalaea
- Carpathus
- Cos
- Ios
- Lemnus
- Lerus
- Nisyrus
- Parus
- Samos
- Scyrus

Ancient episcopal sees of the Roman province of Lesbos (the Aegean Islands) listed in the Annuario Pontificio as titular sees:

- Eressus
- Methymna
- Mitylene
- Strongyle
- Tenedus

== See also ==
- Titular bishop
- Titular church
- Archbishop § Titular archiepiscopal sees
- List of Catholic titular sees
- List of Catholic dioceses (structured view)

== Literature ==
- Kiminas, Demetrius (2009). The Ecumenical Patriarchate: A History of Its Metropolitanates with Annotated Hierarch Catalogs. Wildside Press LLC. ISBN 9781434458766.
