= Outline of Panama =

Overview of and topical guide to Panama

The Flag of Panama

The Coat of arms of Panama

The location of Panama

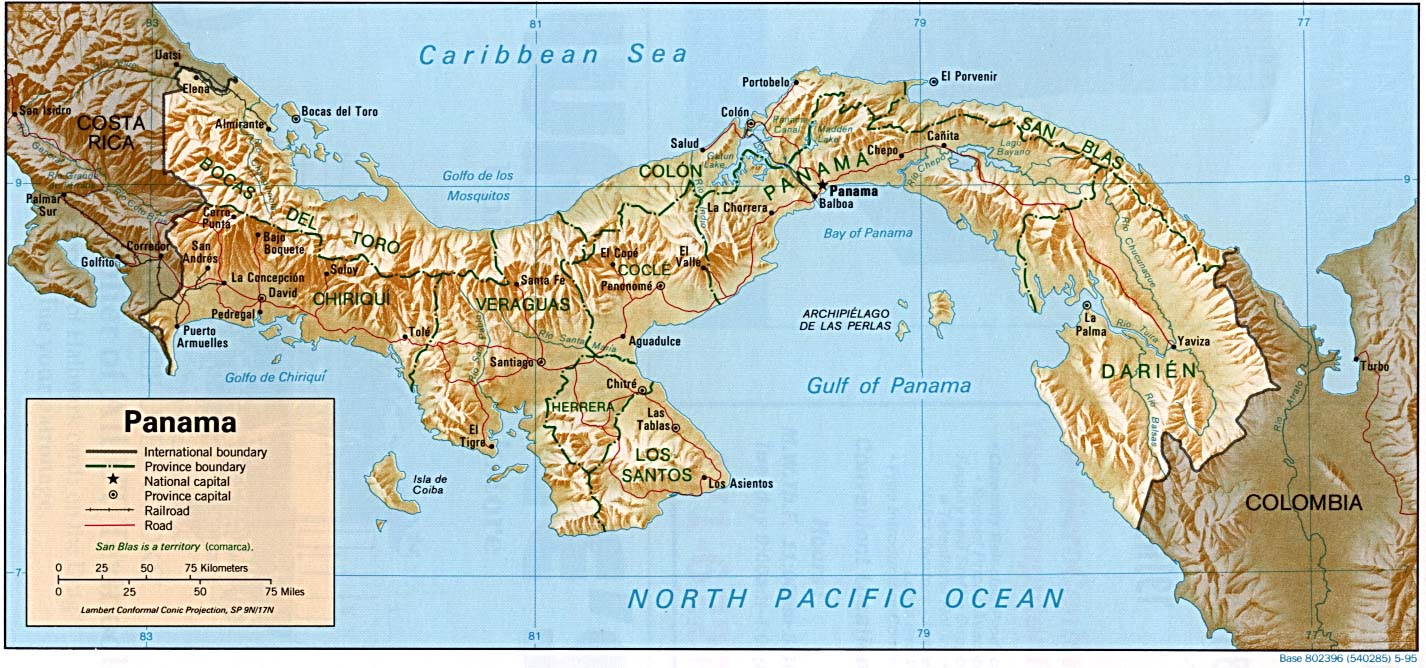
An enlargeable relief map of the Republic of Panama

The following outline is provided as an overview of and topical guide to Panama:

Panama – sovereign country located on the Isthmus of Panama in Central America. Some geographers categorize Panama as a transcontinental nation connecting the northern and southern portions of the Americas. Panama borders Costa Rica to the north-west, Colombia to the south-east, the Caribbean Sea to the north and the North Pacific Ocean to the south. It is an international business center and host to important ports, for the volume of traffic, in the Pacific and Caribbean side. Although Panama is the 3rd largest economy in Central America, after Guatemala and Costa Rica, it has the largest expenditure on resource consumption, making the country the largest consumer in Central America.

== General reference ==
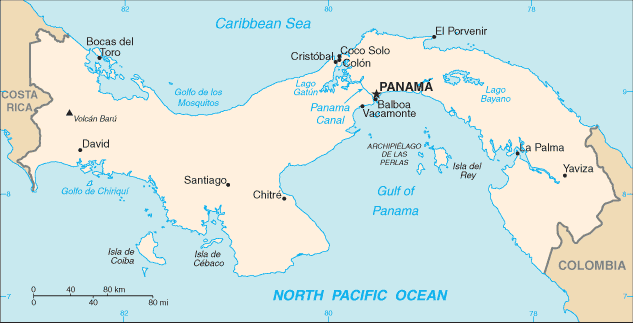
An enlargeable basic map of Panama

- Pronunciation:
- Common English country name: Panama
- Official English country name: The Republic of Panama
- Common endonym(s):
- Official endonym(s):
- Adjectival(s): Panamanian
- Demonym(s):
- Etymology: Name of Panama
- International rankings of Panama
- ISO country codes: PA, PAN, 591
- ISO region codes: See ISO 3166-2:PA
- Internet country code top-level domain: .pa

== Geography of Panama ==
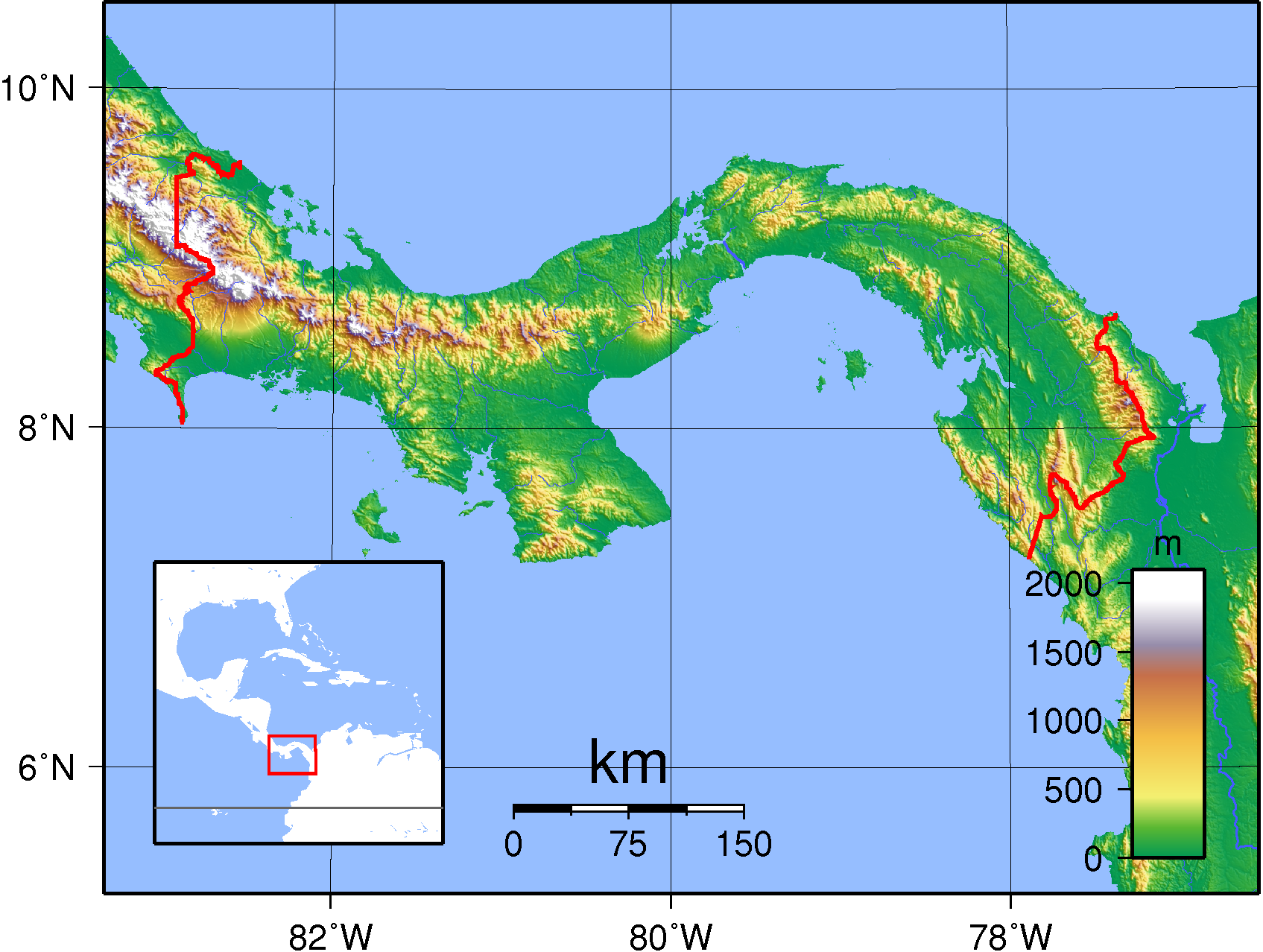
An enlargeable topographic map of Panama

Geography of Panama

- Panama is: a country
- Location:
  - Northern Hemisphere and Western Hemisphere
    - Americas
      - North America
        - Middle America
          - Central America
  - Time zone: Eastern Standard Time (UTC-05)
  - Extreme points of Panama
    - High: Volcán Barú 3,475 m (11,401 ft)
    - Low: North Pacific Ocean and Caribbean Sea 0 m
  - Land boundaries: 555 km

Costa Rica 330 km
Colombia 225 km

- Coastline: 2,490 km

- Population of Panama: 3,343,000 - 131st most populous country
- Area of Panama: 75,517 km^{2}
- Atlas of Panama

=== Environment of Panama ===
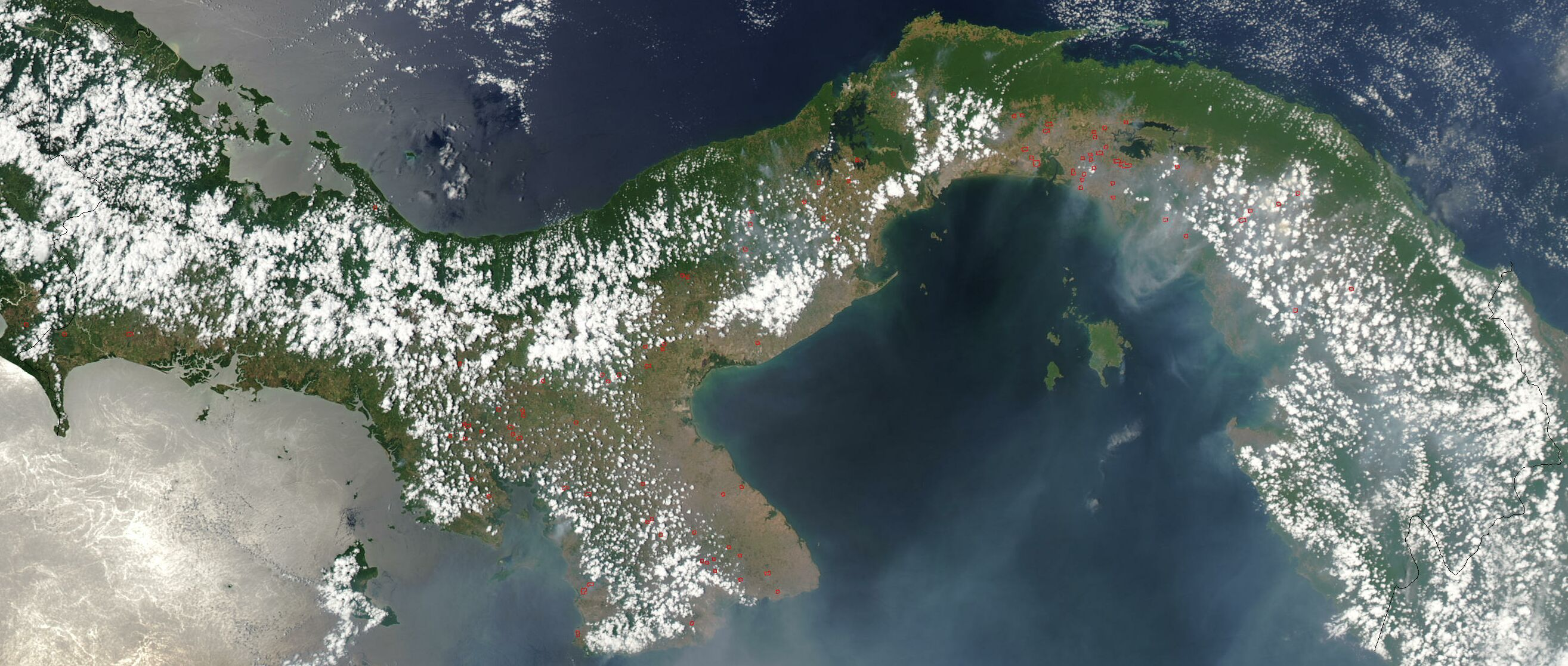
An enlargeable satellite image of Panama

- Climate of Panama
- Renewable energy in Panama
- Geology of Panama
- Protected areas of Panama
  - Biosphere reserves in Panama
  - National parks of Panama
- Wildlife of Panama
  - Fauna of Panama
    - Birds of Panama
    - Mammals of Panama
      - Monkey species of Panama

==== Natural geographic features of Panama ====
- Fjords of Panama
- Glaciers of Panama
- Islands of Panama
- Lakes of Panama
- Mountains of Panama
  - Volcanoes in Panama
- Rivers of Panama
  - Waterfalls of Panama
- Valleys of Panama
- World Heritage Sites in Panama

=== Regions of Panama ===
Regions of Panama

==== Ecoregions of Panama ====
List of ecoregions in Panama

- Ecoregions in Panama

==== Administrative divisions of Panama ====
Administrative divisions of Panama

- Provinces of Panama
  - Districts of Panama
    - Municipalities of Panama
- Capital of Panama: Panama City
- Cities of Panama

=== Demography of Panama ===
Demographics of Panama

== Government and politics of Panama ==
Politics of Panama

- Form of government: Presidential representative democratic republic with a multi-party system
- Capital of Panama: Panama City
- Elections in Panama
- Political parties in Panama

=== Branches of the government of Panama ===
Government of Panama

==== Executive branch of the government of Panama ====
- Head of state and head of government: President of Panama, José Raúl Mulino
- Cabinet of Panama

==== Legislative branch of the government of Panama ====
- National Assembly (unicameral)

==== Judicial branch of the government of Panama ====
Court system of Panama

- Supreme Court of Panama

=== Foreign relations of Panama ===
Foreign relations of Panama

- Diplomatic missions in Panama
- Diplomatic missions of Panama

==== International organization membership ====
The Republic of Panama is a member of:

- Agency for the Prohibition of Nuclear Weapons in Latin America and the Caribbean (OPANAL)
- Andean Community of Nations (CAN) (observer)
- Central American Bank for Economic Integration (BCIE)
- Central American Integration System (SICA)
- Food and Agriculture Organization (FAO)
- Group of 77 (G77)
- Inter-American Development Bank (IADB)
- International Atomic Energy Agency (IAEA)
- International Bank for Reconstruction and Development (IBRD)
- International Chamber of Commerce (ICC)
- International Civil Aviation Organization (ICAO)
- International Criminal Court (ICCt)
- International Criminal Police Organization (Interpol)
- International Development Association (IDA)
- International Federation of Red Cross and Red Crescent Societies (IFRCS)
- International Finance Corporation (IFC)
- International Fund for Agricultural Development (IFAD)
- International Labour Organization (ILO)
- International Maritime Organization (IMO)
- International Mobile Satellite Organization (IMSO)
- International Monetary Fund (IMF)
- International Olympic Committee (IOC)
- International Organization for Migration (IOM)
- International Organization for Standardization (ISO)
- International Red Cross and Red Crescent Movement (ICRM)
- International Telecommunication Union (ITU)
- International Telecommunications Satellite Organization (ITSO)
- International Trade Union Confederation (ITUC)
- Inter-Parliamentary Union (IPU)
- Latin American Economic System (LAES)
- Latin American Integration Association (LAIA) (observer)
- Multilateral Investment Guarantee Agency (MIGA)
- Nonaligned Movement (NAM)
- Organisation for the Prohibition of Chemical Weapons (OPCW)
- Organization of American States (OAS)
- Permanent Court of Arbitration (PCA)
- Rio Group (RG)
- South American Community of Nations (CSN) (observer)
- Unión Latina
- United Nations (UN)
- Union of South American Nations (UNASUR) (observer)
- United Nations Conference on Trade and Development (UNCTAD)
- United Nations Educational, Scientific, and Cultural Organization (UNESCO)
- United Nations Industrial Development Organization (UNIDO)
- Universal Postal Union (UPU)
- World Confederation of Labour (WCL)
- World Customs Organization (WCO)
- World Federation of Trade Unions (WFTU)
- World Health Organization (WHO)
- World Intellectual Property Organization (WIPO)
- World Meteorological Organization (WMO)
- World Tourism Organization (UNWTO)
- World Trade Organization (WTO)

=== Law and order in Panama ===
Law of Panama

- Constitution of Panama
- Crime in Panama
- Human rights in Panama
  - LGBT rights in Panama
  - Freedom of religion in Panama
  - Penal system of Panama
- Law enforcement in Panama

=== Military of Panama ===
Military of Panama

- Command
  - Commander-in-chief:
    - Ministry of Defence of Panama
- Forces
  - Army of Panama
  - Navy of Panama
  - Air Force of Panama
  - Special forces of Panama
- Military history of Panama
- Military ranks of Panama

=== Local government in Panama ===
Local government in Panama

== History of Panama ==
History of Panama

- Timeline of the history of Panama
- Current events of Panama
- Military history of Panama

== Culture of Panama ==
Culture of Panama

- Architecture of Panama
- Cuisine of Panama
- Festivals in Panama
- Languages of Panama
- Media in Panama
- National symbols of Panama
  - Coat of arms of Panama
  - Flag of Panama
  - List of Panamanian flags
  - National anthem of Panama
- People of Panama
- Prostitution in Panama
- Public holidays in Panama
- Records of Panama
- Religion in Panama
  - Buddhism in Panama
  - Christianity in Panama
  - Hinduism in Panama
  - Islam in Panama
  - Judaism in Panama
  - Sikhism in Panama
  - World Heritage Sites in Panama
  - TransPanama Trail

=== Art in Panama ===
- Literature of Panama
- Music of Panama

=== Sports in Panama ===
Sports in Panama

- Football in Panama
- Panama at the Olympics

== Economy and infrastructure of Panama ==
Economy of Panama

- Economic rank, by nominal GDP (2007): 95th (ninety-fifth)
- Agriculture in Panama
- Banking in Panama
  - National Bank of Panama
- Communications in Panama
  - Internet in Panama
- Companies of Panama
- Currency of Panama: Balboa/Dollar
  - ISO 4217: PAB/USD
- Health care in Panama
- Panama Stock Exchange
- Transport in Panama
  - Airports in Panama
  - Rail transport in Panama
- Tourism in Panama
- Water supply and sanitation in Panama

== Education in Panama ==
Education in Panama

== See also ==
Panama

- List of international rankings
- List of Panama-related topics
- Member state of the United Nations
- Outline of Central America
- Outline of geography
- Outline of North America
