= Law of Panama =

The law of Panama is based on civil law, with influences from the Spanish legal tradition and Roman law. For the first several years of its existence, Panamanian law depended upon the legal code inherited from Colombia. The first Panamanian codes, promulgated in 1917, were patterned upon those of Colombia and other Latin American states that had earlier broken away from the Spanish Empire. Therefore, Panama's legal heritage incorporated elements from Spain and its colonies.

Several features of Anglo-American law have also been accepted in Panama. Habeas corpus, a feature of Anglo-American legal procedure that is not found in many Latin American codes, has been constitutionally guaranteed in Panama. Judicial precedent, another Anglo-American practice, has also made some headway. Judges and magistrates usually have had little leeway in matters of procedure, delays, and degrees of guilt.

== The Public Ministry ==
The Public Ministry provided for in the Constitution has defended the interest of the state, fostered the enforcement and execution of laws, judicial decisions, and administrative orders, supervised the official conduct and the performance of duty of public officials, prosecuted offenses of constitutional or legal provisions, and served as legal adviser to administrative officials. The functions of the Public Ministry are fulfilled by the attorney general of the republic, the solicitor general, the district attorneys, and the municipal attorneys.

There are two alternates for each official of the ministry; all are appointive positions. The attorney general, the solicitor general, and their alternates are executive appointees; district attorneys and municipal attorneys are appointed by their immediate superiors in the judicial system. They, in turn, appoint subordinate personnel in their own offices.

== Specific articles ==
In addition to the stipulations for "free, prompt, and uninterrupted" administration of justice and the establishment of the Public Ministry, the Constitution contains several other provisions on the application of laws, the treatment of citizens under the law, and the handling of prisoners. Article 21 guarantees freedom from arbitrary arrest, and Article 22 provides for habeas corpus. Article 29 prohibits the death penalty.

Article 42 provides that "In criminal matters, a law favorable to the accused always has priority and retroactivity, even though the judgement may have become final." Article 163 gives the president power to grant pardons for political offenses, to reduce sentences, and to grant parole. Article 187 states that a person convicted of an offense against public order may not hold any judicial office in the future. Article 218 establishes trial by jury.

== Rights and duties of citizens ==
Under a section of the Constitution headed "Individual and Social Rights and Duties," private citizens are assured that they can be prosecuted by government authorities only for violations of the Constitution or the law. The procedure for arrests is also described, stating that arrests may result from a response to complaints made to the police or from direct action by police or DENI agents at the scene of the crime or disturbance.

The validity of citizen's arrest is recognized: "An offender surprised flagrante delicto may be apprehended by any person and must be delivered immediately to the authorities." The police may hold no person for more than twenty-four hours without being brought before a competent authority or charged with an offense. The Constitution forbids arrest or detention for violation of purely civil obligations or for debts.

During an investigation, the accused and all witnesses are questioned, the latter under oath. The Constitution guarantees that no accused person may be forced to incriminate himself or herself, and the authorities are forbidden to force testimony from any close relative, whether related by blood or marriage, that is, "within the fourth degree of consanguinity or the second degree of affinity."

Investigators may enter a person's home only with consent or a written order (search warrant) from a competent authority or to assist victims of crime or natural disaster. In general, all testimony must be presented in writing and signed by investigators, the accused, and witnesses. If a case warrants prosecution, it is referred to the appropriate court. Although bail is permissible in some cases, it is a privilege subject to many restrictions and may be denied at the request of the prosecutor if a judge concurs.

== Alleged violations ==
Considerable evidence emerged that many constitutional provisions were not realized in the daily lives of Panamanian citizens as of the late 1980s. The most striking example involved the case of Dr. Hugo Spadafora, a former senior government official, who had criticized the role of the Defense Forces in politics and the alleged role of Noriega in drug trafficking. Spadafora's headless body was found in Costa Rica near the border of Panama in September 1985 after reports that he had been taken into custody by members of the Defense Forces. There were also allegations that Dr. Mauro Zúñiga, head of an opposition group called the National Civilian Coordinating Committee (Coordinador Civilista Nacional—COCINA), was abducted and beaten.

Although the Constitution provides for habeas corpus and for the prompt and uninterrupted administration of justice, several incidents suggested that these principles were sometimes violated. Note that various articles of the Constitution guaranteeing basic rights were suspended during the temporary state of emergency declared in 1987. Moreover, the Panamanian government responded with excessive brutality to popular marches and demonstrations in Panama in mid-1987. According to a December 1987 United States Senate staff report on Panama, over 1,500 persons were arrested between June and September 1987. Credible evidence suggests that many of them were subjected to cruel and inhuman treatment while in jail.

== See also ==
- Abortion in Panama
- Constitution of Panama
- Intellectual property law in Panama
- Law enforcement in Panama
- Penal system of Panama
