= Religion in Panama =

Religion in Panama (2015 estimate)
1. Catholicism (63.2%)
2. Evangelicalism (25.0%)
3. Irreligion (7.59%)
4. Jehova's Witnesses (1.44%)
5. Seventh-day Adventist (1.28%)
6. Church of Jesus Christ of Latter Day Saints (0.57%)
7. Buddhism (0.46%)
8. Other (0.45%)

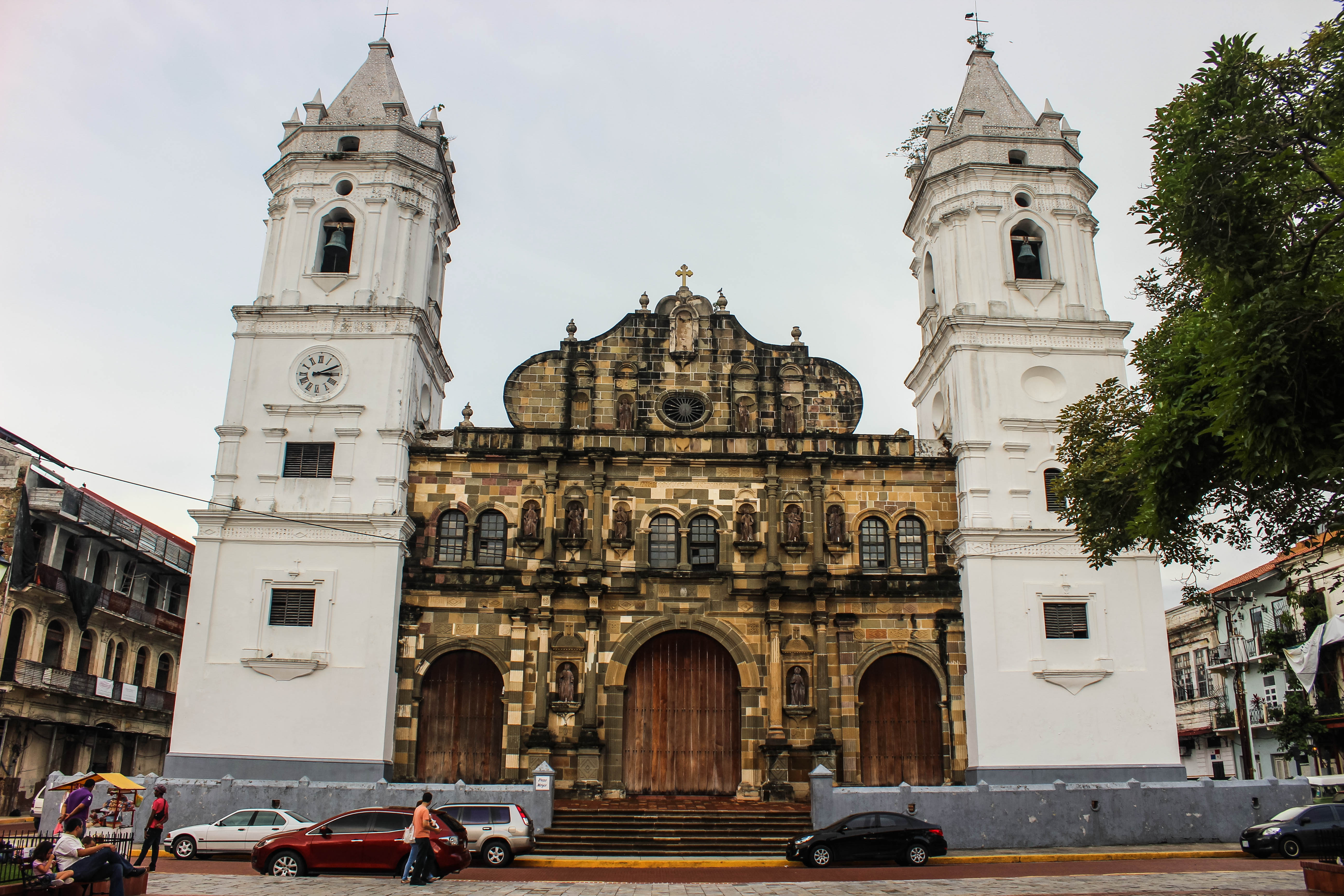
The Metropolitan Archcathedral Basilica of Santa María la Antigua in Panama City.

The predominant religion in Panama is Christianity, with Catholic Church being its largest denomination. Before the arrival of Spanish missionaries, the various ethnic groups residing in the territory of modern-day Panama practiced a multitude of faiths.

The Panamanian constitution provides for freedom of religion, and the government generally respects this right in practice. The US government reported that there were no reports of societal abuses or discrimination based on religious belief or practice in 2007.

== Overview ==
An official survey carried out by the government estimated in 2015 that 63.19% of the population identifies itself as Roman Catholic and 25 percent as evangelical Protestant. The Jehovah's Witnesses were the third largest congregation comprising 1.4% of the population, followed by the Adventist Church and the Church of Jesus Christ of Latter-day Saints with the 0.6%. There is a Buddhist (0.4%) and a Jewish community (0.1%) in the country. The Baháʼí Faith community of Panama is estimated at 2.00% of the national population, or about 60,000 including about 10% of the Guaymí population; the Baháʼís maintain one of the world's eight Baháʼí Houses of Worship in Panama.

== Distribution in 2007 ==
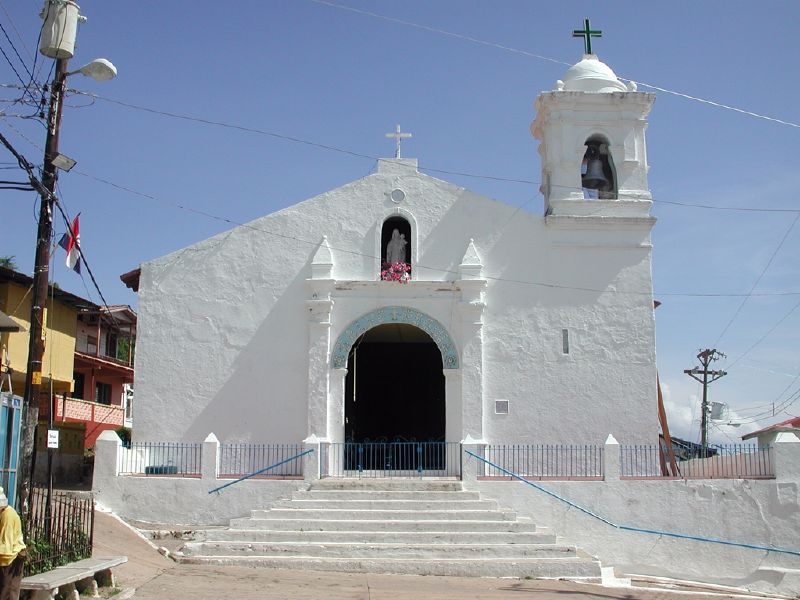
Iglesia San Pedro, Taboga Island, Panama. The Iglesia San Pedro is the second-oldest colonial era church in the Western Hemisphere.

Catholics are found throughout the country and at all levels of society. Evangelical Christians also are dispersed geographically and are becoming more prominent in society. The mainstream Protestant denominations, which include Southern Baptist Convention and other Baptist congregations, United Methodist, Methodist Church of the Caribbean and the Americas, and Lutheran, derive their membership from the Antillean black and the expatriate communities, both of which are concentrated in Panamá and Colón Provinces. The Jewish community is centered largely in Panama City. Muslims live primarily in Panama City and Colon, with smaller concentrations in David and other provincial cities. The vast majority of Muslims are of Lebanese, Palestinian, or Indian descent.

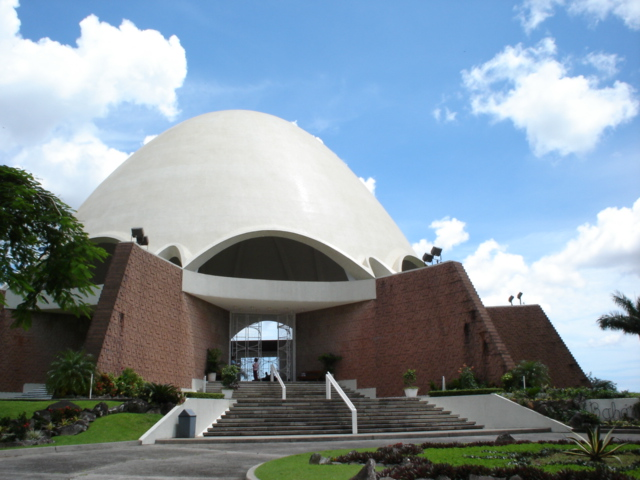
Baháʼí House of Worship, Panama City, Panama

The Church of Jesus Christ of Latter-day Saints claims over 62,946 members in Panama. Smaller religious groups include Buddhists with between 15,000 and 20,000 members, Seventh-day Adventists, Jehovah's Witnesses, Episcopalians with between 7,000 and 10,000 members, Muslim communities with approximately 10,000 members each, Hindus, and other Christians. Indigenous religions include Ibeorgun (among Guna) and Mamatata (among Ngobe). There is also a small number of Rastafarians.

== Judaism in Panama ==
=== Colonial period ===
The presence of anusim or crypto-Jews in the Isthmus of Panama has been documented since the earliest migrations of Spaniards and Portuguese to the region. However, due to the legal restrictions imposed by the Crown and the Inquisition, there was no Jewish community that openly practiced its faith.

Researcher and writer Elyjah Byrzdett, author of numerous works on the subject, points out that the phenomenon of conversos in Panama can be divided into two major periods: the Castilian period and the Portuguese period.

The Castilian period (1501–1580) was marked by the arrival of crypto-Jews of Castilian origin, who played an active role in the colonization of the territory. In his book The Pisa Family: A Converso Lineage, Byrzdett documents the detailed genealogy of the Pisa family, whose descendants arrived in Panama and later settled in other regions. Although not all crypto-Jews bore the surname "de Pisa," the author uses it as a reference due to its relevance as a common ancestral line among many converso families in the region.

The Portuguese period began in 1580, following the dynastic union of Portugal with the Castilian monarchy. During this stage, Portuguese crypto-Jews, who were more organized and had greater resources, managed to establish a house of prayer on Calle Calafates, located behind the old Cathedral of Panama la Vieja. However, the Inquisition intensified its persecution of Judaizers, culminating in 1640 in an event known as the "Great Conspiracy," which dismantled much of the crypto-Jewish network in the isthmus. From that point onward, their presence in historical records became increasingly faint, as fear of persecution drove many to conceal their identity even further.

One of the most well-documented episodes of this persecution was the arrest of the Portuguese Sebastián Rodríguez, accused of practicing Judaism. Rodríguez led a group of crypto-Jews that included Antonio de Ávila, González de Silva, Domingo de Almeyda, and a Mercedarian friar, all of whom secretly practiced Judaism. During the judicial proceedings, four doctors certified the presence of the mark of circumcision on Rodríguez, which was used as evidence against him. A room has been dedicated to them in the Museum of the Archaeological Center of Panama City.

=== Union to Colombia period ===
When the Isthmus joined Simón Bolívar's Federation project, a new Hebrew migration took place, revitalizing the Mosaic faith on isthmian soil. These early Jewish immigrants arrived under a new initial policy that promoted religious freedom in the newly independent territories. They played a crucial role as intermediaries and translators, bridging the gap between the local population and foreigners arriving or passing through the region, thanks to their proficiency in languages such as German, Spanish, French, English, Dutch, and Papiamento.

Jews, both Sephardic (Judeo-Spanish) and Ashkenazi (Judeo-German), began to arrive in significant numbers in Panama in the mid-19th century, drawn by economic opportunities such as the construction of the transoceanic railroad and the California Gold Rush. This migration marked an important chapter in the history of the Jewish community in Panama.

=== Republican period ===
The Republic of Panama, in its current form, would have experienced a very different reality without the notable contributions of the Panamanian Jewish community. Their role in the country's independence movement in 1903 was of crucial importance and prevented the failure of the separatist movement. Distinguished members of the Kol Shearith Israel Congregation, such as Isaac Brandon, M.D. Cardoze, M.A. De León, Joshua Lindo, Morris Lindo, Joshua Piza, and Isaac L. Toledano, provided essential financial support to the Revolutionary Junta when Philippe Jean Bunau-Varilla's promises of funds did not materialize. Without their contribution, the lives of the leaders of Panama's separation from Colombia could have been in jeopardy.

Following this period, there were other waves of Jewish immigration to Panama. During World War I, individuals from the disintegrating Ottoman Empire arrived in the country. After World War II, there was immigration from Europe, and Jews from Arab countries arrived due to the 1948 exodus. More recently, Jewish immigrants from South American nations facing economic crises have joined the Panamanian Jewish community. These groups have contributed to the diversity of the Jewish population in present-day Panama.

The epicenter of Jewish life is in Panama City, although historically, small Jewish communities were established in other cities such as Colon, David, Chitre, Las Tablas (since the late 17th century), La Chorrera, Santiago de Veraguas, and Bocas del Toro. As families moved to the capital in search of education for their children and for economic reasons, these communities gradually dissolved.

Despite their relatively small demographic size compared to the total population of the country (approximately four million inhabitants), the Jewish community numbers between 15,000 and 17,000 people. Currently, the vibrant Jewish community is concentrated in Panama City and is fully integrated into Panamanian society. Unlike in other countries, Panamanian Jews actively participate in trade, government, civic functions, and diplomacy. With the exception of Israel, Panama is the only country in the world to have had two Jewish presidents in the 20th century:

In the 1960s, Max Delvalle first served as vice president and then as president of the Republic. Delvalle is known for his inaugural speech in which he stated, "Today there are two Jewish presidents in the world, the president of the State of Israel and myself." Later, his nephew, Eric Arturo Delvalle, assumed the presidency of the Republic between 1985 and 1988. Both were members of the Kol Shearit Israel synagogue and were involved in Jewish life in Panama.

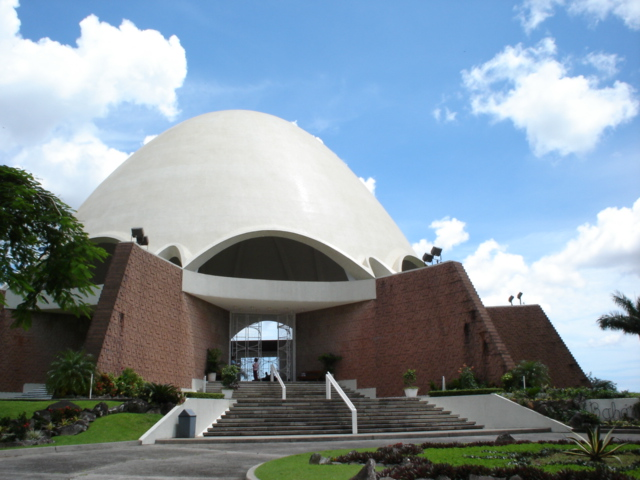
Baháʼí House of Worship, Panama City, Panama

== Historical trends ==
- Sources: Based on Pew Center Research (including historical percentages of Catholicism), by ends-1900 there were 26,000 U.S. American (more than half being Protestants) stablished for the Canal construction making the 9% in a total population of 290,000 (1911 census)

== Freedom of religion ==
In 2023, the country was scored 4 out of 4 for religious freedom.

== See also ==
- Christianity in Panama
  - Catholic Church in Panama
- Baháʼí Faith in Panama
- Islam in Panama
- Hinduism in Panama
- History of the Jews in Panama
- Freedom of religion in Panama
- Sikhism in Panama
