= 1998 Panamanian constitutional referendum =

30 August 1998

Results
Choice	Votes	%
Yes	385,885	35.01%
No	716,401	64.99%
Valid votes	1,102,286	98.06%
Invalid or blank votes	21,827	1.94%
Total votes	1,124,113	100.00%
Registered voters/turnout	1,718,603	65.41%

A constitutional referendum was held in Panama on 30 August 1998. Voters were asked whether they approved of amending the 1972 constitution to allow the President and Vice President to be re-elected for a second term and dismissal of MPs by their own parties. Only 34.3% voted in favour of the reforms, with a turnout of 65.4%.

== Results ==
Choice	Votes	%
For	385,885	34.33
Against	716,401	63.73
Invalid/blank votes	21,827	1.94
Total	1,124,112	100
Registered voters/turnout	1,718,603	65.4
Source: Nohlen
