= 1940 Panamanian constitutional referendum =

Panama constitutional referendum

A constitutional referendum was held in Panama on 15 December 1940. Voters were asked whether the new constitution should be enacted. A reported 99% voted in favour.

== Results ==
Choice	Votes	%
For	144,312	98.72
Against	1,865	1.28
Total	146,177	100.00
Valid votes	146,177	99.65
Invalid/blank votes	512	0.35
Total votes	146,689	100.00
Source: Nohlen
