= Catholic Church in Panama =

The Catholic Church has been active in Panama since the early 16th century. A diocese was established in 1513, and the Archdiocese of Panamá was established in 1925. The church was recognised as the state religion of Colombia, but the Constitution of Panama established a separation of church and state.

== History ==
The Diocese of Darién was established in 1513, and Juan de Quevedo, the first Catholic bishop on the American continent, arrived in 1514. The Archdiocese of Panamá was created by Pope Pius XI in 1925.

Our Lady of the Assumption Cathedral was destroyed during Henry Morgan's sack of Panama City in 1671.

Bishop José Higinio Durán supported the independence of Panama in 1821.

Catholicism was made the official religion of Panama in 1832, but the separation of church and state was instituted in 1853. Ecclesiastical courts were abolished by President Francisco de Paula Santander in 1836. Catholicism was made the official religion again in 1866, but the separation of church and state was restored in 1903. The 1904 Constitution of Panama recognised the Catholic Church, but did not give it any special privileges. Freedom of religion was guaranteed by the 1946 constitution and the teaching of Catholicism in schools was made optional.

=== Orders ===
A monastery was created by the Franciscans in Darién in 1510.

The first Dominican Order monetary in Panama was established in Nombre de Dios, Colón in 1519. The Jesuits also arrived in Panama in 1519.

The University of Panama was established by the Jesuits in 1594.

The Jesuits were expelled from Panama in 1702, but were allowed back in Colombia in 1844. The Jesuits were expelled again in 1850.

== Demographics ==
Catholics accounted for 90.7% of Christians in Panama in 1911, but this declined to 59.85% by 2018.

The Claretians started proselytizing to the Guna people in the 1920s. Around 3,000 of the 24,000 Guna were baptized by the Claretians by the 1940s. One-fifth of the Guna were reportedly Catholic by the 1950s.

== See also ==
- Religion in Panama
- Christianity in Panama
- List of cathedrals in Panama

== Works cited ==
- Cruz, Joel (2014). The Histories of the Latin American Church: A Handbook. Augsburg Fortress Publishers. ISBN 9781451465648.
- Kanter, Deborah (2025). Pioneers of Latino Ministry: Claretians and the Evolving World of Catholic America. New York University Press. ISBN 9781479832484.
- Ross, Kenneth; Bidegain, Ana; Johnson, Todd (2022). Christianity in Latin America and the Caribbean. Edinburgh University Press. ISBN 9781474492140.
