= 1992 Panamanian constitutional referendum =

A constitutional referendum was held in Panama on November 15, 1992. Voters were asked whether they approved of a series of amendments to the 1972 constitution, including reducing the power of the armed forces. Only 32.83% voted in favour of the reforms, with a turnout of 40%.

== Results ==
Choice	Votes	%
For	174,690	32.83
Against	357,355	67.17
Invalid/blank votes	27,606	–
Total	559,651	100
Registered voters/turnout	1,397,003	40.06
Source: Direct Democracy
