= Crime in Panama =

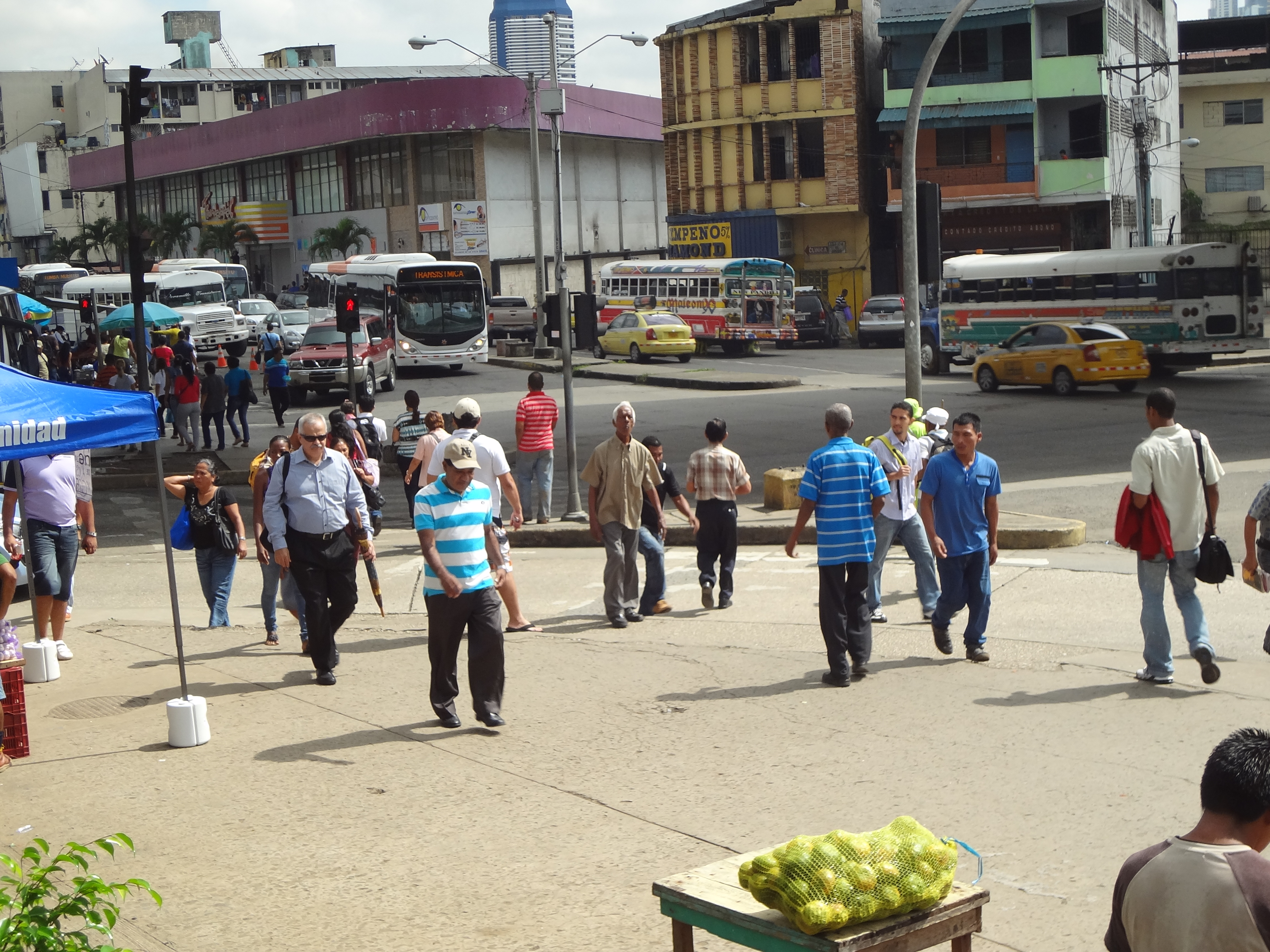
A street scene in Panama City

Crime in Panama is investigated by the Panamanian police. In 2024 there were approximately 581 homicides, up from 556 in 2023 (a 4.4% increase). The homicide rate was about 12.9 per 100,000 inhabitants, rising from 11.5 the year prior. A decade prior, the homicide rate was 15 per 100,000 inhabitants. The most common crimes in Panama are domestic violence, with over 21,000 registered cases; and theft, with nearly 17,000 registered cases.

== Crime by type ==
=== Murder ===
In 2012, Panama had a murder rate of 17.2 per 100,000 population. There were a total of 654 murders in Panama in 2012.

=== Kidnapping ===
Panamanian authorities conducted a study which indicates that almost 90 percent of express kidnappings are unreported due to the threat that thieves impose on the victim and relatives of the victim. The procedure of express kidnapping consist of abducting the victim and taking possession of valuables such as cellphones, watches, credit cards, cash and jewelry. Besides taking all of the victim's valuables, the kidnappers make the victim withdraw money from different ATM locations.

Once the kidnapper is satisfied, the abducted person is usually released. In other cases, the kidnappers may ask for ransom money for the release of the victim. This long process of kidnapping is slowly decreasing, since most kidnappers want a quick payoff without complicated negotiations with relatives.

=== Illegal drug trade ===
In the 1980's, Panama became an important connection for shipping narcotics to the US and other countries. The International Narcotics Control Strategy has reported that traffickers have smuggled narcotics through the country's uncontrolled transportation system, such as airfields, coastlines, containerized seaports and highways. The FARC (Revolutionary Armed Forces of Colombia) has also contributed to the increase.

Many of the FARC soldiers who seek shelter and refugee from Colombian Armed Forces cross the border between Darien and Colombia. Since the FARC arrived in Panama, drug trafficking has significantly increased. Waterways are being watched carefully by the Panamanian Naval Forces, but the FARC has adapted ways of smuggling narcotics across Panama by land.

Panama's involvement in drug trafficking began as early as the beginning of the 20th century, when opium was trafficked through the Panama Canal on its voyage from Asia to Europe. In the 1960s Panama's involvement with drug trade was its production of cannabis, but by the 1980s it became one of the transit points for the drug trafficking of cocaine from South America to the United States thanks to its shared border with Colombia.

The illegal drug trade in Panama includes trans-shipment of cocaine to the United States. The 1989 United States invasion of Panama to topple Dictator Manuel Noriega was justified in part by the need to combat drug trafficking. Noriega, the dictator of Panama from 1983 to 1989, had a relationship with the U.S. Central Intelligence Agency (CIA) from the 1950s. More recently, Mexican cartels such as the Sinaloa Cartel have been active in Panama.

==== Manuel Noriega ====
Although the relationship did not become contractual until 1967, Noriega worked with the U.S. Central Intelligence Agency (CIA) from the late 1950s until the 1980s. In 1988 the U.S. Drug Enforcement Administration indicted him on federal drug charges.

The 1988 Senate Subcommittee on Terrorism, Narcotics and International Operations concluded that "The saga of Panama's General Manuel Antonio Noriega represents one of the most serious foreign policy failures for the United States. Throughout the 1970s and the 1980s, Noriega was able to manipulate U.S. policy toward his country, while skillfully accumulating near-absolute power in Panama. It is clear that each U.S. government agency which had a relationship with Noriega turned a blind eye to his corruption and drug dealing, even as he was emerging as a key player on behalf of the Medellín Cartel (a member of which was notorious Colombian drug lord Pablo Escobar)." Noriega was allowed to establish "the hemisphere's first 'narcokleptocracy'".

One of the large financial institutions that he was able to use to launder money was the Bank of Credit and Commerce International (BCCI) which was shut down at the end of the Cold War by the FBI. Noriega shared his cell with ex-BCCI executives in the facility that is known as "Club Med".

As a result of the 1989 invasion of Panama by the United States, Manuel Noriega was removed from power, captured, detained as a prisoner of war, and flown to the United States. Noriega was tried on eight counts of drug trafficking, racketeering, and money laundering in April 1992. Noriega's U.S. prison sentence ended in September 2007; pending the outcome of extradition requests by both Panama and France, for convictions in absentia for murder in 1995 and money laundering in 1999, respectively. France was granted its extradition request in April 2010. He arrived in Paris on April 27, 2010, and after a re-trial as a condition of the extradition, he was found guilty and sentenced to seven years in jail in July 2010.

=== Robbery ===
Robberies prevalent in Panama include armed robberies and muggings.

=== Domestic violence ===
Domestic violence in Panama is a serious problem and remains underreported. Domestic violence, including spousal rape, psychological, physical, and economic abuse, are criminalized. Panama enacted Ley No.38 del 2001 against domestic violence. In 2013, the country enacted Law 82 - Typifying Femicide and Violence Against Women (Ley 82 - Tipifica el Femicidio y la Violencia contra las Mujeres) a comprehensive law against violence against women.

=== Corruption ===
Panamanians have been working to root out the after-effects of several decades of military rule since the country's return to democracy in 1989. In 2020, it was reported that Panama loses approximately 1% of its GDP every year to corruption, including government corruption. However, the country is working to improve its democracy, and in July 2020, two ex-presidents of the country (Ricardo Martinelli and Juan Carlos Varela) were questioned over their involvement in the Odebrecht bribery scandal. Martinelli was eventually released after being found not guilty, but was subsequently re-arrested on charges of money laundering. Two sons of Martinelli (Luis Enrique and Ricardo Alberto Martinelli) were also charged with bribery and money laundering by the United States. In August 2020, Panama joined forces with the United States to form a joint task force to root out money laundering.

=== Human trafficking ===
Panama is a source, transit, and destination country for women and children subjected to trafficking in persons, specifically forced prostitution. Although some Panamanian women and girls have been found in forced prostitution in other countries in Latin America and in Europe, most Panamanian trafficking victims are exploited within the country. Although statistics have been lacking, both NGOs and government officials have anecdotally reported that commercial sexual exploitation of children was greater in rural areas and in the city of Colon than in Panama City. NGOs have also reported that some Panamanian children, mostly young girls, have been subjected to involuntary domestic servitude.

Weak controls along Panama's borders have made the nation an easy transit point for irregular migrants, from Latin America, East Africa, and Asia, some of whom may have fallen victim to human trafficking. Panamanian law requires the National Immigration Office's trafficking victims unit to provide assistance to foreign trafficking victims. However, a report by the United States Department of State found that during the period reported in 2010, authorities did not report extending victim services to repatriated Panamanian victims or foreign victims of trafficking, and the Immigration Office indicated that there were no foreign victims of trafficking over the past year.

Authorities have increased public awareness about the prostitution of children through seminars in schools and an outreach campaign with the tourism sector, having been manifested in sending 300 letters to the tourism sector to raise awareness of commercial sexual exploitation of children. Despite such efforts, the government has showed little evidence of progress in combating human trafficking. Law enforcement efforts have as of 2010 remained weak, with the Panamanian penal code not prohibiting trafficking for forced labor, and the government has failed to provide adequate assistance to victims and to identify trafficking victims among vulnerable populations. Child sex tourism is prohibited by law, though the aforementioned US Department of State report found no reported prosecutions of sex tourists during the reporting period.

Panama ratified the 2000 UN TIP Protocol in August 2004. The U.S. State Department's Office to Monitor and Combat Trafficking in Persons placed the country in "Tier 2" in 2017 and 2023. In 2023, the Organised Crime Index noted that police officers colluded in organising this crime.

==== Prosecution ====
Article 178 of the Panamanian penal code, which was updated in 2008, prohibits the internal and transnational movement of persons for the purpose of sexual servitude or forced commercial sexual activity. The prescribed sentence is four to six years imprisonment, which is increased to six to nine years if trafficking offenders use deceit, coercion, or retain identity documents, and is further increased to 10 to 15 years if the victim is under 14 years of age. Article 177 prohibits sexually exploiting another person for profit. Under aggravated circumstances of threat, force, or fraud, this constitutes human trafficking as defined by international protocol, and carries a sentence of eight to 10 years. Article 180 prohibits the internal and transnational trafficking of minors for sexual servitude, prescribing prison terms of eight to 10 years' imprisonment, and Article 179 prohibits subjecting an individual to sexual servitude using threats or violence.

Prosecutors may also use other statutes, such as anti-pimping laws, to prosecute trafficking crimes. The above punishments are commensurate with those prescribed for rape. Panamanian law, however, does not specifically prohibit human trafficking for the purpose of forced labor, including domestic servitude.

Authorities have maintained a small law enforcement unit to investigate sex trafficking and related offenses, and Panamanian law requires that one prosecutor in each of Panama's 13 provinces be trained to prosecute trafficking crimes. One prosecutor based in Panama City was dedicated exclusively to prosecuting trafficking crimes. Some judges received training on sex trafficking.

== By location ==
Based upon reported incidents by local police, the high-crime areas around Panama City are San Miguelito, Río Abajo, El Chorrillo, Ancón, Tocumen, Pedregal, Curundu, Veracruz Beach, Panamá Viejo, and the Madden Dam overlook.

In its 2015 report, the US State Department cited the more dangerous areas of Panama City are: Panama Viejo (the neighborhood, not the park itself), Cabo Verde, Curundu, San Miguel, Marañon, Chorillo, Barraza, Santana, Monte Oscuro, San Miguelito, Ciudad Radial, San Cristobal, San Pedro, Pedregal, San Juaquin, Mañanitas, Nuevo Tocumen, 24 de Diciembre, Sector Sur Tocumen, Felipillo, Chilibre, Caimitillo, Alcalde Diaz, and Pacora.

== Crime dynamics ==
=== Street gangs ===
The Panamanian gangs appeared in the late 1950s after a group of local college students forcefully attempted to gain access to an American Army Post, Ft. Amador, and were shot and killed. The gangs have increased in numbers since the Panamanian Army was disbanded in 1990 due to the United States invasion of Panama. A 2009 census reported that there are about 108 street gangs.

More than 1,600 youths between the ages of 13 and 15 are affiliated with youth gangs. Most of the youth gangs are fueled by drugs.

=== Government action ===
Police checkpoints have become commonplace during weekends on roads in between cities. However, most are simply drivers license and plate checks.

=== Curfews ===
Panamanian authorities have adopted a curfew policy for youths under 18 years of age. Students who are attending night classes must carry a permit or identification card, provided by the school or an official certified person. Youths under 18 who are caught without them are subject to detention at a police station until they are released to their legal guardians. A fine around $50.00 is issued to the legal guardians if the youth is apprehended for the first time.

Curfews consist of special strategic checkpoints around the main streets in Panama. Each person inside a vehicle must carry an identification card or be accompanied by their legal guardians. Authorities have helped slowly decrease the amount of unattended youth loitering around the streets. Most thefts and kidnappings are carried out by minors.

== See also ==
- Law enforcement in Panama
- Penal system of Panama
