= Hotel Riu Plaza Panama =

Hotel in Panama City, Panama

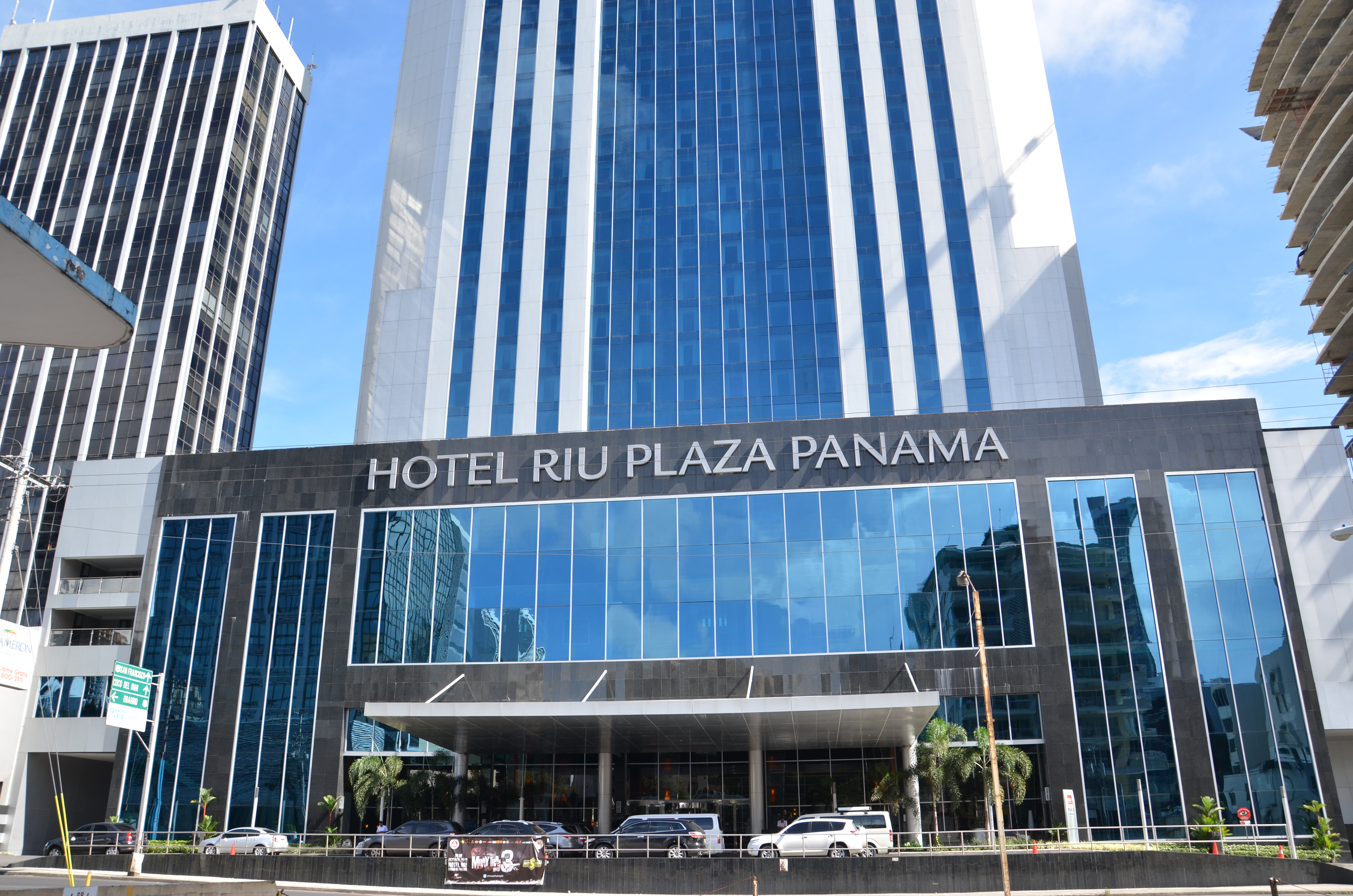
- The hotel in 2012

General information
- Location: Bella Vista, Panama City, Panama, Calle 50 and 53 Este, Marbella
- Opening: September 13, 2010
- Owner: RIU Hotels & Resorts
- Operator: RIU Hotels & Resorts

Technical details
- Floor count: 34

Other information
- Number of rooms: 644

Website
- www.riu.com/en/hotel/panama/panama-city/hotel-riu-plaza-panama

Hotel Riu Plaza Panama is an urban hotel located on Calle 50, in the Marbella area of Bella Vista, Panama City, Panama. Operated by the Spanish hotel chain RIU Hotels & Resorts, the property has 644 rooms distributed across 34 floors. It opened on September 13, 2010, becoming the company's first urban hotel and the inaugural property of its Riu Plaza brand, which was developed for city destinations rather than conventional resort locations.

== History ==
The hotel opened in September 2010 under the initial name Riu Panama Plaza. Its establishment marked RIU's entry into urban hospitality, following decades of operating primarily beach resorts. The new format was conceived to accommodate business travelers, conferences, incentive travel, and leisure visitors within city centers.

Panama City was selected partly because of its position as a commercial, banking, and financial center in Central America. The hotel was established in Bella Vista, near Calle Uruguay, in an area containing restaurants, bars, and nightlife venues. Its location within the city's financial district also provides access to commercial establishments and public transportation, including the nearby Iglesia del Carmen and Vía Argentina metro stations.

The hotel began operating on September 13, 2010. Its first anniversary was marked in 2011, when RIU introduced a corporate incentive program aimed at employees responsible for arranging business travel reservations.

During its initial years, the property served as a venue for corporate meetings and conventions. In a 2012 interview, Iván Garrido, then director of the Riu Plaza business division, discussed the adjustments required to adapt the company's resort-oriented operations to the urban hotel market. He reported that hotel occupancy had increased compared with the preceding year and identified corporate events and group bookings as principal areas of activity.

In 2025, the hotel underwent a comprehensive renovation covering its 644 rooms, restaurants, common areas, meeting rooms, and swimming pool. Following the renovations, the property continued to accommodate corporate events and conventions, with more than 3,000 m^{2} (32,000 sq ft) of function rooms and approximately 2,000 m^{2} (22,000 sq ft) of additional shared spaces.

In April 2026, RIU held an event at the property commemorating its 15th anniversary. The gathering brought together approximately 180 attendees, including representatives of Promtur, the Panama City government, and the Panamanian Hotel Association (APATEL). The company presented the renovated facilities and announced a program to measure the carbon footprint associated with events hosted at the hotel. It also announced an agreement with the nonprofit organization Casa Esperanza to contribute to the operating costs of two child assistance centers in Calidonia and Agua Dulce.

== Features ==
Riu Plaza Panama accommodates both leisure and corporate guests. Its facilities include a business center, in-room Wi-Fi, and conference facilities. Venue listings describe 23 meeting rooms and approximately 57,000 sq ft (5,300 m^{2}) of meeting space, although published figures for the total area vary. The hotel's event facilities have a reported standing reception capacity of 1,300 people.

The accommodation includes standard guest rooms, executive rooms, and suites. According to a 2026 description of the property, room categories range from deluxe rooms to larger suites, including presidential suites and a penthouse. The hotel also has an outdoor swimming pool, a fitness center, restaurants, and several bars.

The dining facilities include Arts, which provides breakfast service, and Tastes, a restaurant serving Spanish-inspired cuisine. Additional food and beverage services are available through the hotel's bars and room service.

== Events ==
The hotel has hosted business, political, and cultural events in Panama City.

In June 2011, former United States president Bill Clinton delivered a lecture at the hotel attended by then Panamanian president Ricardo Martinelli.

In 2012, the final of the Miss Panamá beauty pageant was held on the hotel's terraces along Calle 50. The hotel also hosted the Miss Panamá 2014 pageant, in which Yomatzy Hazlewood won the national title.

In April 2015, the property served as the venue for the Second CEO Summit of the Americas, held in conjunction with the 7th Summit of the Americas. The event brought together business executives and government representatives to discuss economic and commercial issues affecting the region.

== See also ==
- List of tallest buildings in Panama City
- Tourism in Panama
- RIU Hotels
