= Intellectual property law in Panama =

Panama has passed several laws protecting intellectual property in the country.

== Copyright law ==
The National Assembly in 1994 passed a comprehensive copyright bill (Law 15), based on a World Intellectual Property Organization model. The law modernizes copyright protection in Panama, provides for payment of royalties, facilitates the prosecution of copyright violators, protects computer software, and makes copyright infringement a felony. Although the lead prosecutor for IPR cases in the Attorney General's Office has taken a vigorous enforcement stance, the Copyright Office remains small and ineffective. The Copyright Office has been slow to draft and move forward further improvements to the Copyright Law to implement the new WIPO treaties (the WIPO Copyright Treaty and the WIPO Performances and Phonographs Treaty). Nevertheless, their proposal also would establish new offences, such as for internet-based copyright violations, raise the penalties for infractions, and enhance border measures. This proposed draft legislation is moving forward with technical assistance from SIECA (the Central American Economic Integration System).

== Patent law ==
A new Industrial Property Law (Law 35) went into force in 1996 and provides 20 years of patent protection from the date of filing. Pharmaceutical patents are granted for only 15 years, but can be renewed for an additional ten years, if the patent owner licenses a national company (minimum of 30 percent Panamanian ownership) to exploit the patent. The Industrial Property Law provides specific protection for trade secrets.

== Trademarks ==
Law 35 also provides trademark protection, simplifying the process of registering trademarks and making them renewable for ten-year periods. The law's most important feature is the granting of ex officio authority to government agencies to conduct investigations and to seize materials suspected of being counterfeited. Decrees 123 of November 1996 and 79 of August 1997 specify the procedures to be followed by Customs and CFZ officials in conducting investigations and confiscating merchandise. In 1997, the Customs Directorate created a special office for IPR enforcement, followed by a similar office created by the CFZ in 1998. The Trademark Registration Office has undertaken significant modernization with a searchable computerized database of registered trademarks that is open to the public.

== Treaties ==
Panama is a member of the World Intellectual Property Organization (WIPO), the Geneva Phonograms Convention, the Brussels Satellite Convention, the Universal Copyright Convention, the Berne Convention for the Protection of Literary and Artistic Works, the Paris Convention for the Protection of Industrial Property, and the International Convention for the Protection of Plant Varieties. In addition, Panama was one of the first countries to ratify the WIPO Copyright Treaty and the WIPO Performances and Phonograms Treaty.

== Enforcement ==
Protection of intellectual property rights (IPR) in Panama has increased significantly over the past several years. The government passed an Anti-Monopoly Law in 1996 mandating the creation of commercial courts to hear anti-trust, patent, trademark, and copyright cases exclusively. Two district courts and one superior tribunal began to operate in 1997 and have been adjudicating intellectual property disputes. IPR policy and practice in Panama is the responsibility of an Inter-institutional Committee. This committee consists of representatives of six government agencies and operates under the leadership of the Vice-Minister of Foreign Trade. It coordinates enforcement actions and develops strategies to improve compliance with the law.

== See also ==
- Law of Panama
