= List of cathedrals in Panama =

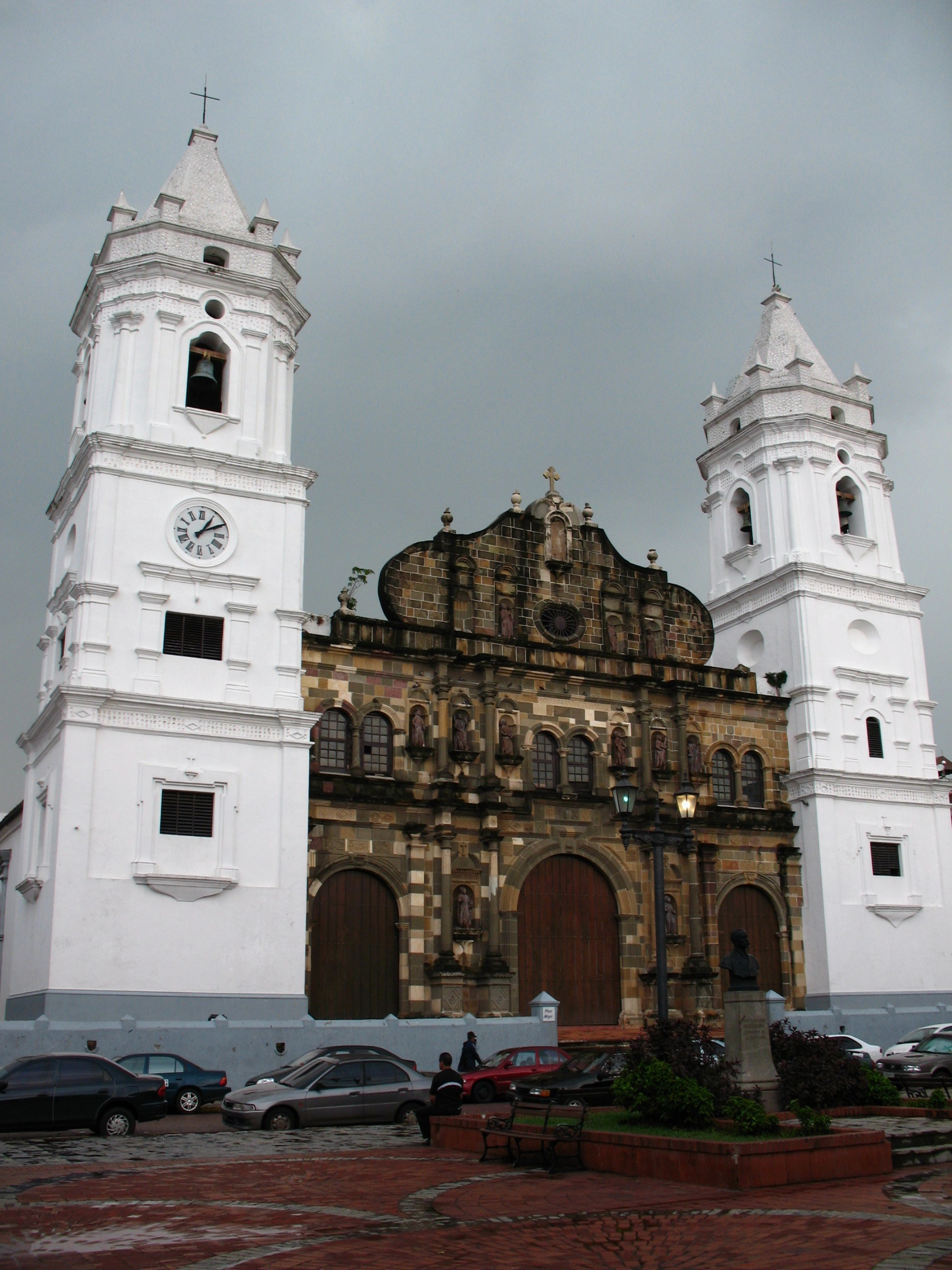
Catedral Metropolitan de Nuestra Señora de la Asunción in Panama City

This is the list of cathedrals in Panama sorted by denomination.

== Catholic ==
Cathedrals of the Catholic Church in Panama:

- Cathedral of Our Lady of Carmel in Bocas del Toro
- Cathedral of St. John Baptist in Chitré
- Cathedral of the Immaculate Conception of Mary in Colón
- Cathedral of Metetí
- Cathedral of St. Joseph in David
- Metropolitan Cathedral of St. Mary in Panama City
- Cathedral of St. John Baptist in Penonomé
- Cathedral of St. James the Apostle in Santiago de Veraguas

== Anglican ==
Cathedrals of the Anglican Church in Central America:

- Catedral San Lucas in Panama City

== See also ==
- Lists of cathedrals
