= Tourism in Panama =

Tourism in Panama represents one of Panama‘s main activities. The main areas of tourism in the country focus on business tourism, beaches, health and trade. Most of the tourists come from the United States, Canada, Europe, Central America, and South America. Tourism generates profits of approximately US$1,400 million annually. This figure has increased rapidly since the millionth tourist arrived in 2004. There were 2 million tourists in 2011.

Tourist arrivals of 2024 in %

About 1.5 million tourists entered Panama in 2013 via the airport of Tocumen. In Panama a tourist, on average, spends US$365–385per day, the highest per capita tourist spending in Central America, while the average tourist in Panama stays for between 6 and 7 days.

In 2011, Panama was visited by more than 2 million tourists, an increase of 18% compared to 2010. The New York Times Magazine placed Panama as the best place to visit in 2012 as the country's economy was working well, with Panama having regained the control of the Canal 12 years previously. For the daily the hallmark of the country is the inter-oceanic way and its extension, which must end in 2014, with an investment of billions of dollars.

The Waldorf Astoria Panama, the first Waldorf Astoria hotel in Latin America, opened in March 2013. The Trump Ocean Club, opened in 2010 and is now JW Marriott Panama. The BioMuseo, a center of natural history, opened in October 2014. The old part of the city, Panamá Viejo, has been a UNESCO World Heritage Site since 1997. The archipelago of Bocas del Toro, is popular with backpackers.

== Hospitality ==
Panama's hotel industry is closely linked to the country's business, convention and leisure tourism. In Panama City, accommodation is concentrated around the financial district, the waterfront, Casco Viejo and the areas connected with the Panama Canal, while beach and island resorts serve visitors travelling to the Pacific and Caribbean coasts. The Autoridad de Turismo de Panamá reported, through hotel monitoring, an estimated hotel occupancy of 73.2% for March 2026.

=== Notable hotels ===
- Waldorf Astoria Panama — opened in 2013 as the first Waldorf Astoria hotel in Latin America.
- JW Marriott Panama — a waterfront hotel in Punta Pacifica, in the tower formerly known as the Trump Ocean Club.
- American Trade Hotel — a Casco Viejo hotel located in a restored 1917 building.
- Sofitel Legend Casco Viejo — occupies the former Club Unión building, constructed in 1917.
- Hotel Riu Plaza Panama — an urban hotel in Panama City, located in the financial district.
- Hotel La Compañía — a Casco Antiguo hotel developed within buildings associated with Spanish, French and American architectural periods.
- The Bristol Panama — a hotel situated in Panama City's financial district.
- Hilton Panama — located on Avenida Balboa, near downtown Panama City and the Cinta Costera.
- The Santa Maria, a Luxury Collection Hotel & Golf Resort — a Panama City resort with an on-site golf course.
- The Westin Playa Bonita Panama — a beach resort near Veracruz, west of Panama City.
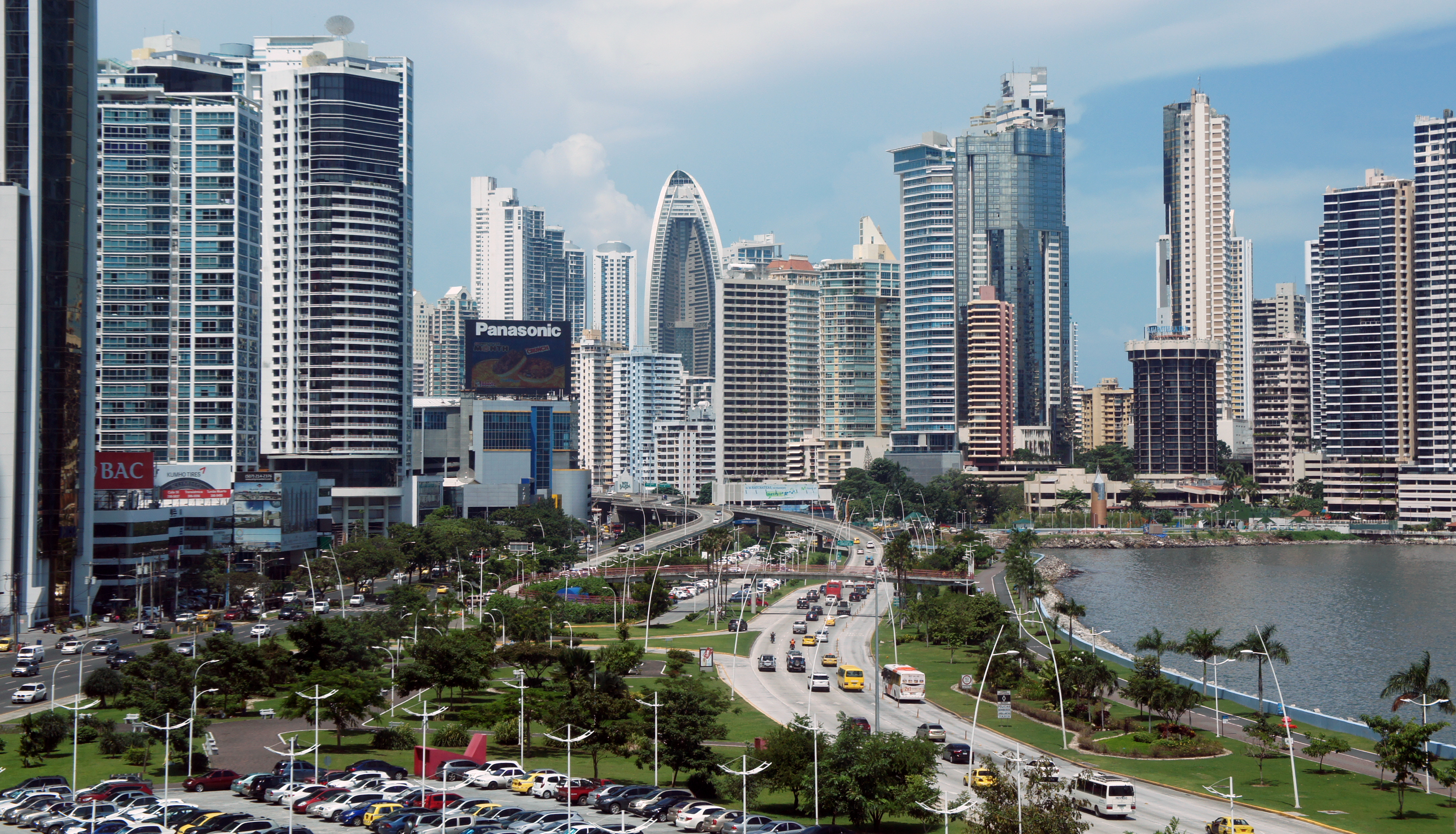
Ave. Balboa, Panamá City

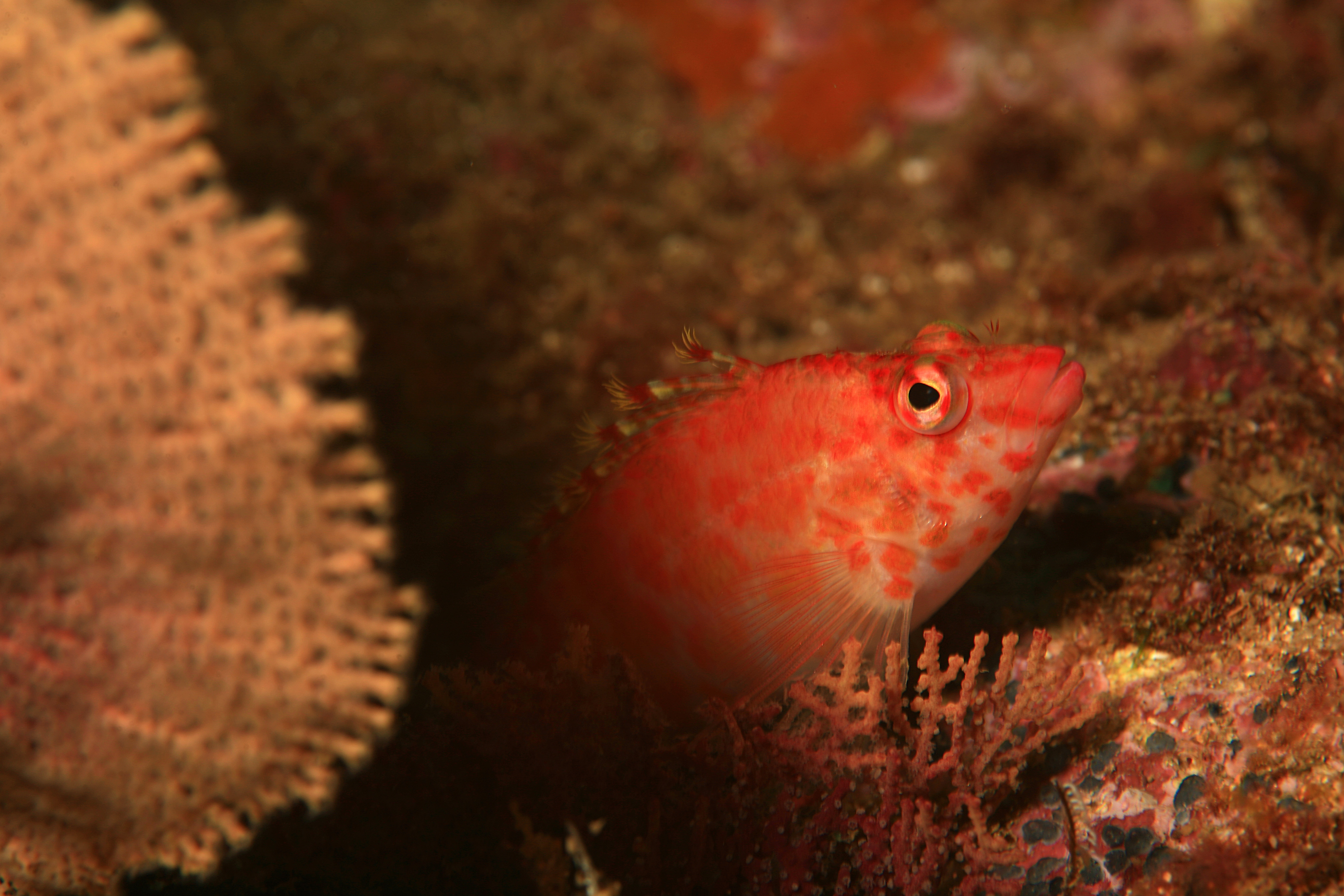
Coiba National Park and Natural Reserve

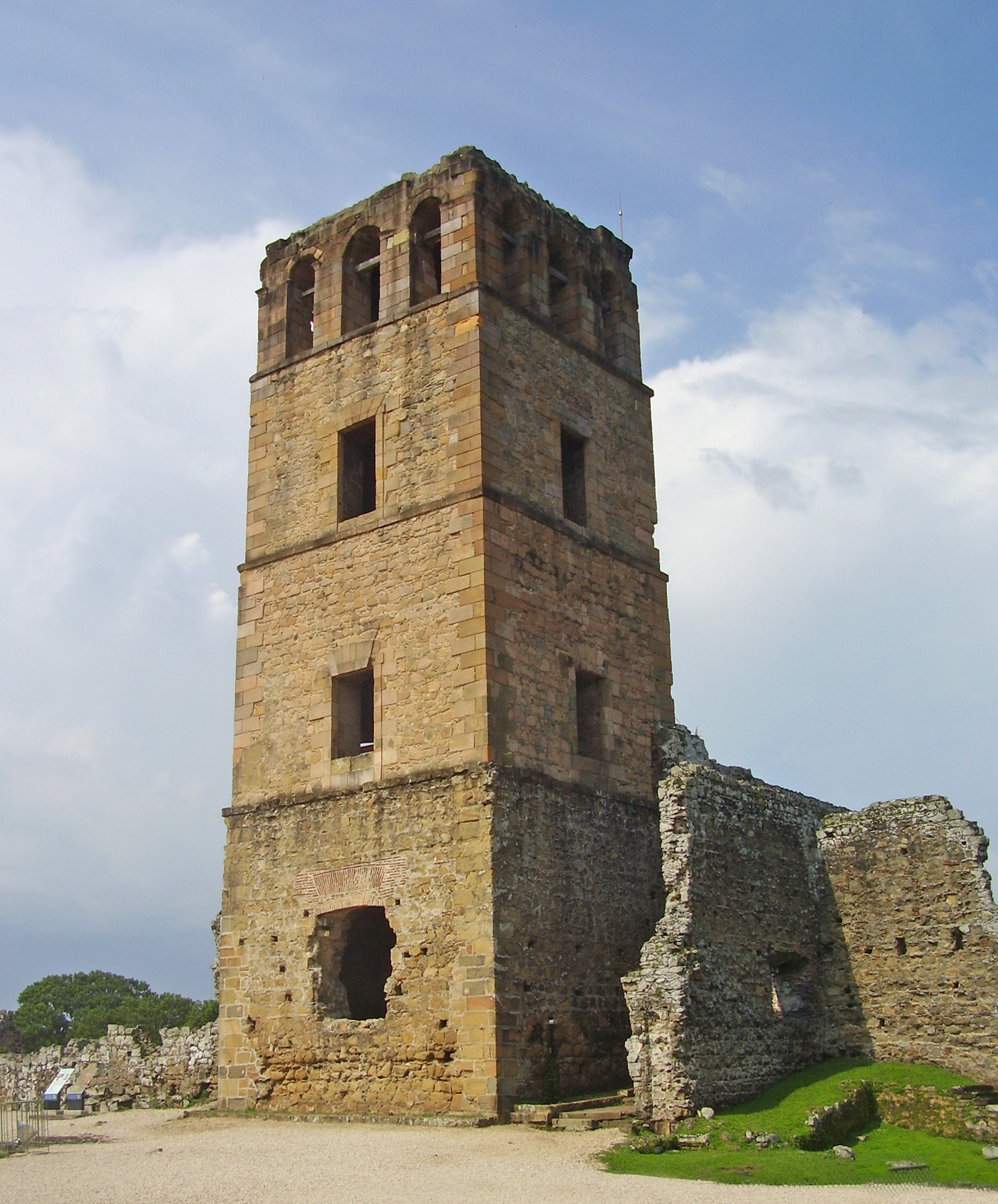
Panamá Viejo cathedral tower

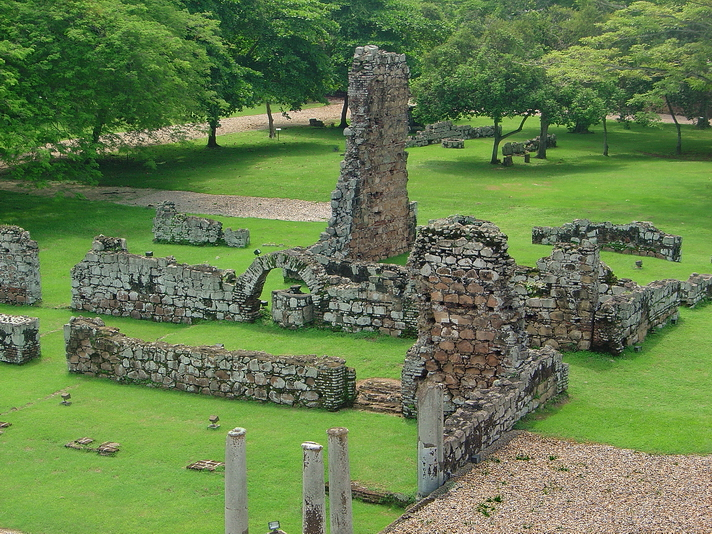
Panamá Viejo

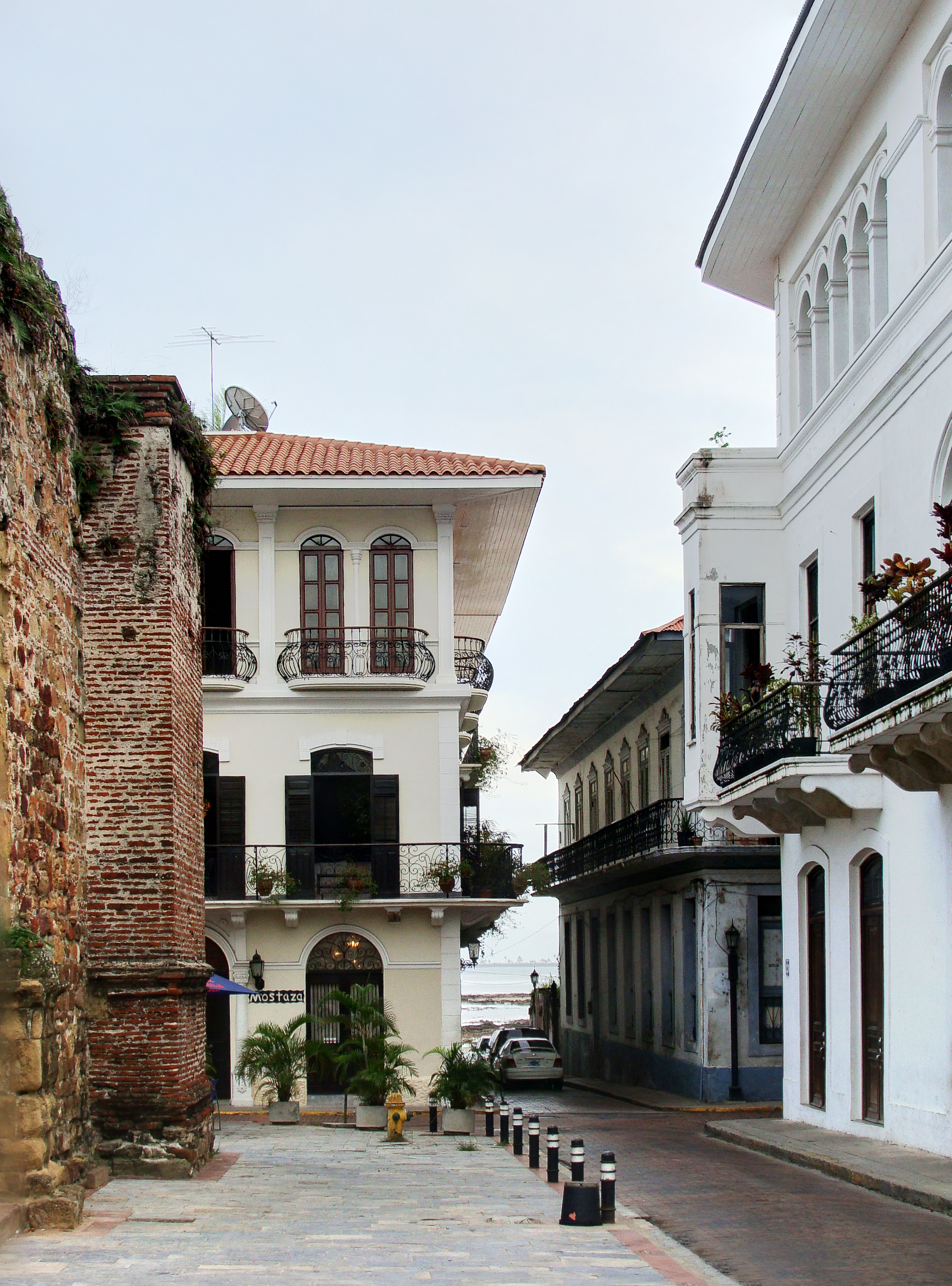
Historic center of Panamá City

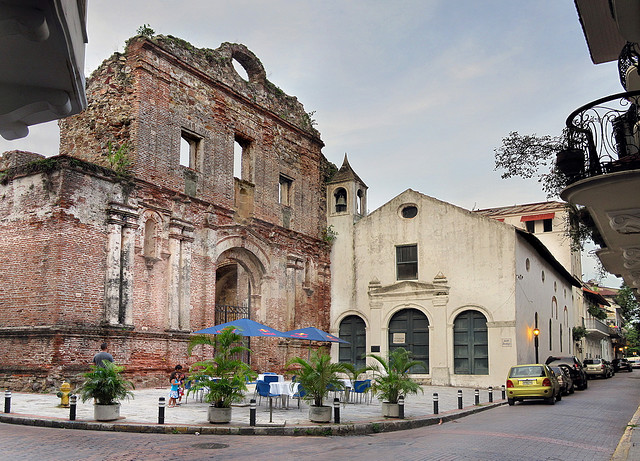
Convent of Santo Domingo

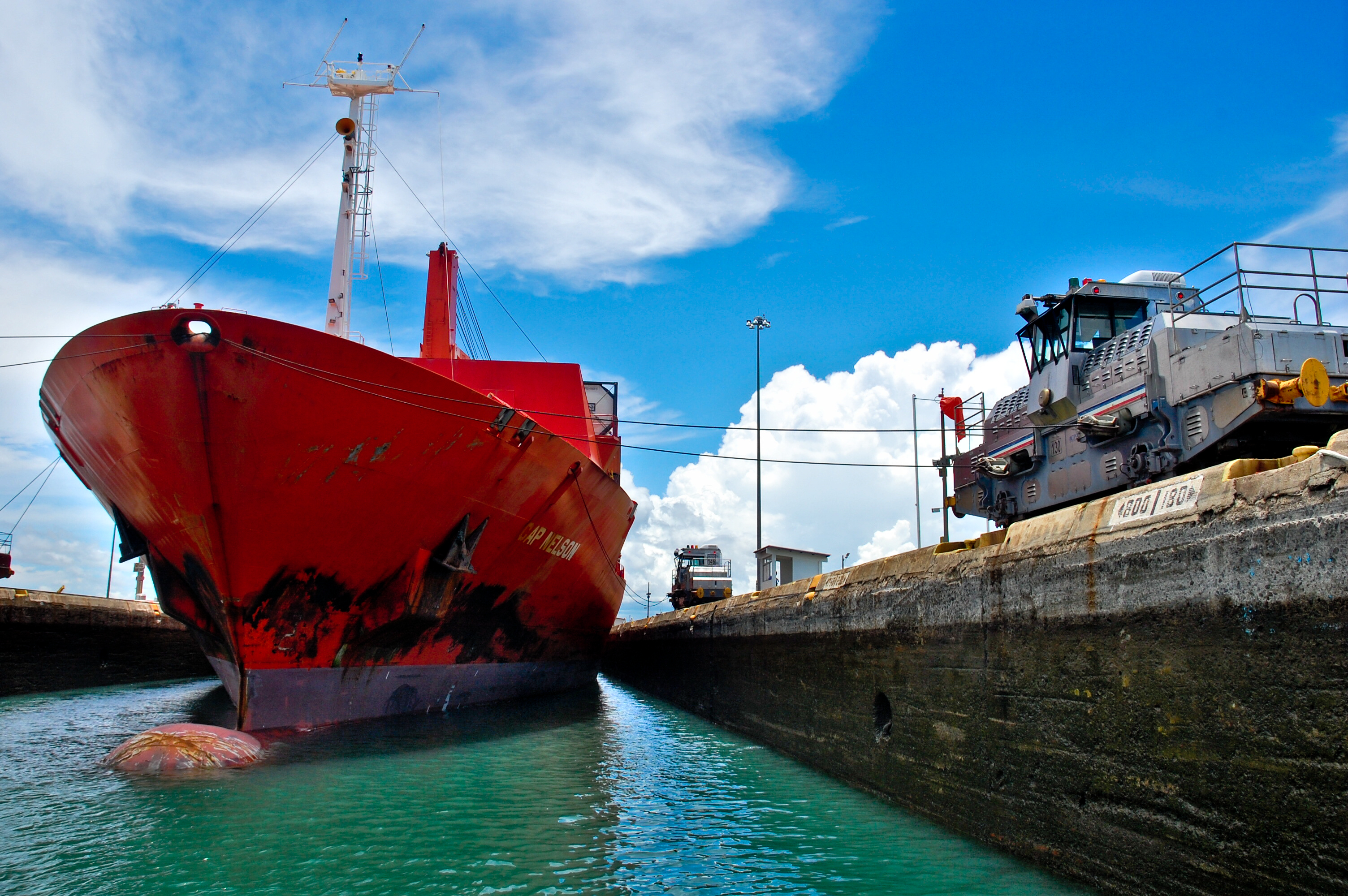
Boat crossing a lock on the Panama Canal

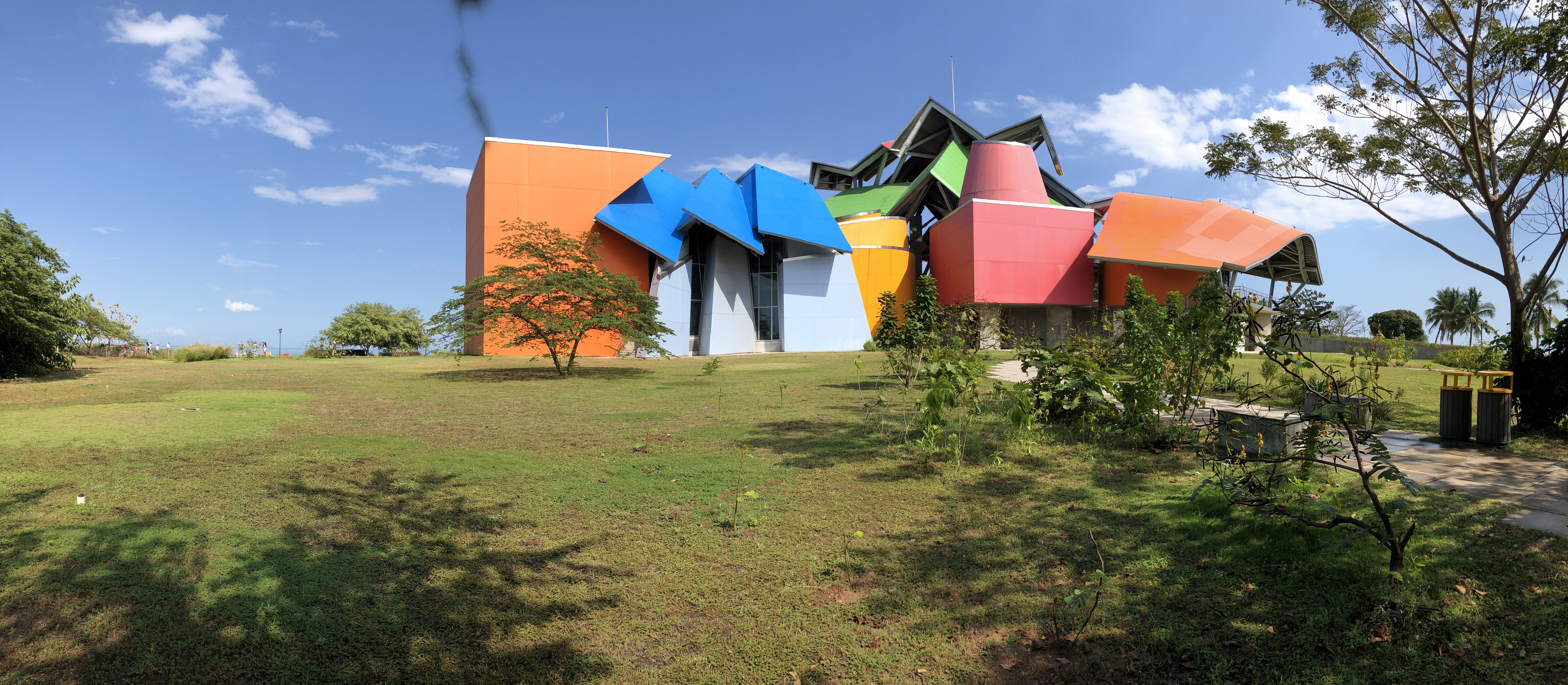
View of the colorful Biomuseo located in Panama City.

== See also ==
- Economy of Panama
