= List of lakes of Panama =

This is a list of lakes of Panama, located completely or partially within the country's borders.

== Lakes ==
- Alajuela Lake
- Arrowhead Lake
- Bayano Lake
- Ciénaga de La Macana (Club Swamp)
- Ciénaga Juncalillo (Juncalillo Swamp)
- Ciénaga Las Pitahallas (Pitaya Swamp)
- Cuenca Salud (Basin of Health)
- Gatun Lake
- Lago de Miraflores (Miraflores Lake)
- Lago El Flor (Flower Lake)
- Laguna de Changuinola (Changuinola Lagoon)
- Laguna de Jugli (Jugli Lagoon)
- Laguna de Yeguada (Herd of Horses Lagoon)
- Laguna de Matusagrati (Matusagrati Lagoon)
- Laguna de Samani (Samani Lagoon)
- Laguna Duri (Duri Lagoon)
- Laguna Rio Diablo (Devil River Lagoon)
- Las Lagunas (The Lagoons)
- Pear Lake
