= Geology of Panama =

The geology of Panama includes the complex tectonic interplay between the Pacific, Cocos and Nazca plates, the Caribbean Plate and the Panama Microplate.

== Geologic history, stratigraphy, and tectonics ==
The Cocos and Nazca plates formed in the Miocene. The Panama microplate is made of oceanic crust basalt, similar to the basalt plateau at the bottom of the Caribbean Sea. The isthmus of Panama formed due to convergent tectonics of the eastern Pacific subduction zone, which created a magmatic arc extending from southern North America.

The center of the isthmus, from Arenal Volcano in Costa Rica to El Valle volcano in Panama was uplifted during the subduction of the unusually thick Cocos Ridge oceanic crust, which also produced the four kilometer high Talamanca Range. The western edge of the Caribbean Plate—the Central American Volcanic Arc—also collided in the Neogene and was compressed as the South American Plate moved northward. The El Valle volcano is the easternmost stratovolcano in Central America. Dacite and andesite flows from five to 10 million years ago are the oldest rocks, followed by a period of quiet 3.4 million years ago and newer dacite domes and pyroclastic flows between 900,000 and 200,000 years ago. The volcano was the result of crust subduction.

The combination of these forces produced the Isthmus of Panama and resulted in different sea surface salinity between the Pacific and Atlantic since 4.2 million years ago. It also resulted in massive interchange of species between North and South America and brought global changes in climate and ocean circulation. The Bocas del Toro Archipelago on the western Caribbean coast records local stratigraphy through this period, with Pliocene to Pleistocene coral reef carbonates overlying Miocene basalt and siliclastic shale.

In the remote southeastern Darién Province, crystalline basement rock of the San Blas Complex forms massifs in the northeast and southwest, dating to the Cretaceous, Paleocene and Eocene. These rocks and others in the north such as rhyolite, dacite, basaltic andesite, granodiorite and quartz diorite indicate that the region was a separate magmatic arc until 20 million years ago. In the south, pre-collision basement rocks include radiolarian chert, pillow basalt and diabase. Complex faulting and folding formed the Chucunaque-Tuira Basin which includes three kilometers of sediments from the Miocene deposited during the collision with South America.

Offshore of Colombia and western Panama, the Panama Basin formed between 27 and eight million years ago due to asymmetric seafloor spreading between the Nazca and Cocos plates. The Mapelo rift and the Yaquina graben in the eastern basin are remnants of old and now inactive spreading centers. Between 22 and 20 million years ago, hotspot volcanism generated the Carnegie, Cocos and Malpelo ridges.
