= International rankings of Panama =

The following are international rankings of Panama

== Economy ==
- The Wall Street Journal and The Heritage Foundation: Index of Economic Freedom 2006^{[unfit]}, ranked 49 out of 157 countries
- International Monetary Fund: GDP (nominal) per capita (2000), ranked 71 out of 182 countries
- International Monetary Fund: GDP (nominal) (2006), ranked 92 out of 181 countries
- United Nations: Human Development Index 2006, ranked 58 out of 177 countries

== Education ==
- Literacy rate 94 percent

== Environment ==
- Yale University: Environmental Sustainability Index 2005, ranked 28 out of 146 countries

== Globalization ==
- A.T. Kearney/Foreign Policy Magazine: Globalization Index 2006, ranked 21 out of 62 countries

== Politics ==
- Transparency International: Corruption Perceptions Index 2006 ranked 84 out of 163 countries
- Reporters Without Borders: Worldwide press freedom index 2006, ranked 39 out of 168 countries

== Technology ==
- World Intellectual Property Organization: Global Innovation Index 2026, ranked 89 out of 139 countries.

== Historical data ==
Index (Year)	Author / Editor / Source	Year of publication	Countries sampled	World; Ranking ^{(1)}	Ranking; L.A.^{(2)}
Environmental Performance (2008)	Yale University	2008	149	32nd	5th
Democracy (2010)	The Economist	2010	167	46th	4th
Global Peace (2008)	The Economist	2008	140	48th	4th
Economic Freedom (2008)	The Wall Street Journal	2008	157	46th	3rd
Quality-of-life (2005)	The Economist	2007	111	47th	7th
Travel and Tourism Competitiveness (2008)	World Economic Forum	2008	130	50th	3rd
Press Freedom (2007)	Reporters Without Borders	2007	169	54th	5th
Global Competitiviness (2007)	World Economic Forum	2007–08	131	59th	3rd
Human Development (2005)	United Nations (UNDP)	2007–08	177	62nd	7th
Corruption Perception (2010)	Transparency International	2010	178	73rd	6th
Income inequality (1989–2007)^{(3)}	United Nations (UNDP)	2007–2008	126	115th	14th

^{(1)} Worldwide ranking among countries evaluated.
^{(2)} Ranking among the 20 Latin American countries (Puerto Rico is not included).
^{(3)} Because the Gini coefficient used for the ranking corresponds to different years depending on the country, and the underlying household surveys differ in method and in the type of data collected, the distribution data are not strictly comparable across countries. The ranking therefore is only a proxy for reference purposes, and though the source is the same, the sample is smaller than for the HDI

Organization	Survey	Ranking
Latin Business Chronicle	Latin Business Index	1 out of 19
World's Best Countries (2008/09)	Newsweek	41 out of 100
Institute for Economics and Peace	Global Peace Index	59 out of 144
United Nations Development Programme	Human Development Index	60 out of 182
Transparency International	Corruption Perceptions Index	73 out of 178
World Economic Forum	Global Competitiveness Report	59 out of 133
Latin Business Chronicle	Latin Globalization Index	1 out of 19
