= Christianity in Panama =

Religion in Panama (2020)
1. Catholicism (72.31%)
2. Protestant (9.85%)
3. Other Christian (8.87%)
4. Other religion (5.5%)
5. No religion (4.36%)

Panama is a predominantly Catholic country.

A survey in 2020 showed that 72.31% of the population were Catholic, 9.85% were Protestant, 8.87% were other Christian, 5.5% followed another religion and 4.36% had no religious beliefs.

Christianity was introduced to the country with the Spanish conquistadors and centuries of missionaries. Like the rest of Latin America, the Catholicism of the conquest began to shift as aspects of indigenous, African and other spiritualities were acculturated. In recent decades, however, Evangelical Protestant churches, especially those denominations strongest in North America, have been gaining ground.

== Denominations ==
The National Institute of Statistics and Census carried out a survey in 2022 and found that while most of the country followed Catholicism, the Episcopalian community had 11,000 members, the Methodist Church had 1,500 members, and the Lutheran Church had 1,000 members; other denominations included Seventh-day Adventists, the Church of Jesus Christ of Latter-day Saints, Jehovah’s Witnesses and Pentecostals.

== Local Christian symbols ==
Like the rest of the continent, Panamanians celebrate Carnaval before Lent, and towns and regions have their own festivals at different parts of the year. The most famous of these is the festival of the Cristo Negro, the Black Jesus Christ, in the town of Portobelo in the Colón Province on October 21. In Las Tablas and Herrera provinces, festivals are held for the Jesus Cristo de Azuero, named after the peninsula.

== See also ==
- Religion in Panama
- Roman Catholicism in Panama
- Anglican Church in Central America
