= Law enforcement in Panama =

Law enforcement in Panama is performed by the Panamanian Public Forces. The Public Forces has several branches which are the National Police of Panama, the National Aeronaval Service, the National Border Service, and the Institutional Protection Service that enforce law within their jurisdiction. Panama abolished its military in 1990, confirmed by a unanimous vote by the National Assembly of Panama for constitutional amendment in 1994. The constitutional amendment prohibit the creation of a standing military force but allow the temporary establishment of special police units to counter acts of "external aggression".

== Curfews ==
Panamanian authorities have adopted a curfew policy for youths under age 18. Students who are attending night classes must carry a permit or identification card, provided by the school or an official certified person. Youths under 18 who are caught without them are subject to detention at a police station until they are released to their legal guardians. A fine around $50.00 is issued to the legal guardians if the youth is apprehended for the first time.

Curfews consist of special strategic checkpoints around the main streets in Panama. Each person inside a vehicle must carry their identification cards or be accompanied by their legal guardians. Authorities have helped slowly decrease the amount of unattended youths loitering around the streets. Most thefts and kidnappings are carried out by minors.

== See also ==
- Canal Zone Police
- Penal system of Panama
- Crime in Panama

== Sources ==
1. World Police Encyclopedia, ed. by Dilip K. Das & Michael Palmiotto. by Taylor & Francis. 2004,
2. World Encyclopedia of Police Forces and Correctional Systems, 2nd. edition, Gale., 2006
3. Sullivan, Larry E. et al. Encyclopedia of Law Enforcement. Thousand Oaks: Sage Publications, 2005.
