= Freedom of religion in Panama =

The Constitution of Panama provides for freedom of religion.

A survey in 2020 showed that 72.31% of the population were Catholic, 9.85% were Protestant, 8.87% were other Christian, 5.5% followed another religion and 4.36% had no religious beliefs.

In 2023, the country was scored 4 out of 4 for religious freedom.

This article in informed by the US State Dept report of 2008. Later reports are available.[4]

== Religious demography ==
The Government does not collect statistics on religious affiliation, but various sources estimate that 75 to 85 percent of the population identifies itself as Roman Catholic and 15 to 25 percent as evangelical Christian. Smaller religious groups include the Church of Jesus Christ of Latter-day Saints (LDS Church) with an estimated 42,000 members, Seventh-day Adventists, Jehovah's Witnesses, Episcopalians with between 7,000 and 10,000 members, Jewish and Muslim communities with approximately 10,000 members each. The first mosque was built by the Ahmadiyya Muslim movement, in 1930. There are small numbers of Hindus, Buddhists, Rastafarians, and other Christians. Local Baháʼís maintain one of the world's seven Baháʼí Houses of Worship. Indigenous religions include Ibeorgun (among Guna) and Mama Tata (among Ngobe).

== Formal status of religious freedom ==
The Constitution provides for freedom of religion, provided that "Christian morality and public order" are respected, and other laws and policies contributed to the generally free practice of religion. The law at all levels protects this right in full against abuse, either by governmental or private actors.

Catholicism enjoys certain state-sanctioned advantages over other faiths. The Constitution recognizes Catholicism as "the religion of the majority" of citizens but does not designate it as the official state religion.

The Government observes Good Friday and Christmas Day as national holidays.

The Constitution provides that religious associations have "juridical capacity" and are free to manage and administer their property within the limits prescribed by law, the same as other "juridical persons." The Ministry of Government and Justice grants "juridical personality" through a relatively simple and transparent process. Juridical personality allows a religious group to apply for all tax benefits available to nonprofit organizations. There were no reported cases of religious organizations being denied juridical personality or the associated tax benefits.

Most foreign religious workers are granted temporary 3-month missionary worker visas. A 12-month extension customarily is granted but could take several months. Foreign missionaries who intend to remain longer than 15 months must repeat the entire application process. Such additional extensions usually are granted. Catholic priests and nuns and rabbis are eligible for a special 5-year visa.

The Constitution dictates that Catholicism be taught in public schools; however, parents have the right to exempt their children from religious instruction. The numerical predominance of Catholicism and the consideration given to it in the Constitution generally have not prejudiced other religious groups.

The Government generally respects religious freedom in practice.

The Constitution limits public offices that religious leaders may hold to those related to social assistance, education, and scientific research.

In 2007, the US government received no reports of religious prisoners or detainees in the country or reports of forced religious conversion.

== Societal discrimination ==
In 2007, the US government received no reports of societal abuses or discrimination based on religious affiliation, belief, or practice.

Christian groups, including the Catholic, Episcopal, Methodist, Lutheran, Baptist, Salvation Army, and Eastern Orthodox churches, have participated in a successful ecumenical movement directed by the nongovernmental Panamanian Ecumenical Committee. Committee members have also participated in an interreligious committee that includes Jewish Reform, Islamic, Buddhist, Baháʼí, Hindu, and Ibeorgun religious groups. The committee has sponsored conferences to discuss matters of religious belief and practice. The committee is a member of the Panamanian Civil Society Assembly, an umbrella group of civic organizations that conducts informal governmental oversight.
