= Administrative divisions of Panama =

Territorial structure of Panama

The Republic of Panama is a unitary state according to its political constitution, which is territorially organized into provinces, districts, corregimientos, and special regimes.

As of December 4, 2020, the political-administrative division of the Republic of Panama comprises 10 provinces, 81 districts (or municipalities), 6 indigenous comarcas, and 702 corregimientos.

== Administrative divisions ==
=== Provinces ===
The province is the largest political division into which the territory of the Panamanian State is divided, composed of legally established districts.

To create a province, the following requirements must be met:

- The territory of the future province must have a minimum population equal to 15% of the total population of the country according to the most recent census.
- A minimum territorial extension of 4,000 square kilometers.
- Physical delimitation of the provincial territory.
- A socioeconomic and financial report from the Ministry of Economy and Finance.
- Favorable decision by the citizens and authorities of the districts through an on-site popular consultation.
- A report from the technical study carried out by the National Commission on Political-Administrative Boundaries.
- The territorial jurisdiction from which the territory is taken must retain at least the same population and territorial extension as the new province.

Each province has a governor freely appointed and removed by the Executive Branch, who acts as its representative within the province. Each governor also has a deputy appointed by the Executive Branch.

Each province has a provincial council, composed of all the corregimiento representatives of the respective province.

=== Districts ===
The district is the political-administrative division of the territory of the province under the jurisdiction of a municipality, composed of corregimientos over which the municipal government exercises authority.

The Political Constitution of Panama recognizes the municipality as the autonomous political organization of the community established in a district. It is considered the fundamental entity of the political-administrative division of the State, with its own democratic and autonomous government. It is responsible for providing public services and constructing public works as determined by law, ordering the development of its territory, promoting citizen participation, as well as the social and cultural improvement of its inhabitants, and fulfilling other functions assigned to it by the Constitution and the law.

To create a district, the following requirements must be met:

- A resident population of 25,000 inhabitants, of whom 1,500 must reside in the district capital.
- Physical delimitation of the district territory.
- A socioeconomic and financial report from the Ministry of Economy and Finance.
- A prior report from the municipal governments involved.
- Favorable decision by the citizens and authorities of the districts through an on-site popular consultation.
- A report from the technical study carried out by the National Commission on Political-Administrative Boundaries.
- The territorial jurisdiction from which the territory is taken must retain at least the same population and territorial extension as the new district.

Regarding authorities, each district has a mayor, who is the head of the municipal administration, and a deputy mayor, both elected by direct popular vote for a five-year term.

Each district has a governing body called the municipal council, composed of all the corregimiento representatives elected within the district.

=== Corregimientos ===
Corregimientos constitute territorial jurisdictions that form part of a district to which they legally belong.

To create a corregimiento, the following requirements must be met:

- In urban areas, a resident population of no fewer than 3,000 inhabitants, of whom at least 500 must be domiciled in the capital. In rural areas, a population of no fewer than 1,000 inhabitants, of whom at least 250 must be domiciled in the capital.
- Physical delimitation of the corregimiento territory.
- A proposal signed by at least 10% of the citizens of the future corregimiento, collected through an on-site popular consultation.
- A socioeconomic and financial report from the Ministry of Economy and Finance.
- A report from the technical study carried out by the National Commission on Political-Administrative Boundaries.
- The territorial jurisdiction from which the territory is taken must retain at least the same population and territorial extension as the new corregimiento.

In the case of high-density urban corregimientos, the new proposal for the creation of a corregimiento must have a minimum population of 20,000 inhabitants and a territorial extension approximately equal to that from which it is segregated.

Corregimientos may also be created with a smaller population base for reasons of territorial extension, poverty levels, and difficult accessibility.

Each corregimiento is administered by a representative elected by direct popular vote for a five-year term. Corregimiento representatives may be re-elected indefinitely.

== Special regimes ==
=== Indigenous comarcas ===
Law 65 of 2015 establishes that, for the creation of special regimes, the requirements set forth in the Constitution and the law must be observed.

The first special regime to be created was the comarca of San Blas (now Guna Yala) through Law 16 of December 19, 1953. This was followed by Emberá-Wounaan (Law 22 of November 8, 1983), Madugandí (Law 24 of January 12, 1996), Ngäbe-Buglé (Law 10 of March 7, 1997), Wargandí (Law 34 of July 25, 2000), and Naso Tjër Di (Law 188 of December 4, 2020).

== Unofficial divisions ==
In addition to the political-administrative divisions recognized by the State, Panama has territorial denominations in common use that are not part of the official territorial organization and lack legal or administrative status.

=== Barrios (Neighborhoods) ===
In Panama, a barrio is an informal designation used to refer to a local area or neighborhood. It does not constitute an official administrative division and is not part of the country’s territorial hierarchy.

Barrios are usually smaller than a corregimiento, which is the smallest legally recognized political-administrative unit. A single corregimiento may contain several neighborhoods, whose boundaries are not officially defined and may vary according to local usage.

Although they are not official, neighborhoods—especially in Panama City—are in many cases better known and more commonly used in daily life than the names of the corresponding corregimientos, and are commonly used in addresses, geographic references, and social contexts.

Some well-known neighborhoods of Panama City include El Cangrejo, Punta Paitilla, Punta Pacifica, and Costa del Este.
