= Penal system of Panama =

Article 27 of the Panamanian constitution declares that the prison system of Panama is based on the principles of security, rehabilitation, and the protection of society. Provisions have been made to establish training programs designed to teach skills and trades that will afford prisoners the opportunity of reentering society as useful citizens after they complete their sentence. The same article also prohibits physical, mental, and moral abuse of prisoners. Juvenile offenders who are sentenced by a court are cared for in a special system that provides protection and education and attempts to rehabilitate them before they came of age. Women are also segregated in the penal system.

The Department of Corrections was established in 1940 to administer the country's penal system for the Ministry of Government and Justice. Operation of the prisons had previously been a direct function of the National Police. The intention of the government officials who established the Department of Corrections was to end the inherent abuses in the system, but the new department was never properly staffed, and police had to be used as jailers. The situation continued into the mid-1980s; because of understaffing in the Department of Corrections, most jails were staffed by members of the Defense Forces, and the prison system was still considered an entity of the FDP. Other abuses apparently also continued. Major complaints expressed about the penal system concerned overcrowding, poor sanitation facilities, and lack of adequate medical attention.

The Isla de Coiba has been the site of the Coiba Penal Colony, Panama's harshest prison, since 1919. Although most of its prisoners are sentenced by courts to specified terms, sometimes persons are sent to Coiba while awaiting the results of pretrial investigation or prior to sentencing, a potential violation of judicial regulations. Prisoners are housed in a main camp and in several small camps scattered about the island, but there is no indication that pretrial detainees are segregated from prisoners serving sentences. In the main camp, there are some facilities for rehabilitation training and a small school; however, many of the inmates have little or no access to those facilities because they live some distance from the main camp. Work is required of all prisoners, including those awaiting trial or awaiting sentencing. Labor is unremunerated for the majority of prisoners, most of whom are engaged in farming and animal husbandry in areas cleared of jungle growth. Some mechanics and other skilled craftsmen receive small wages for their labor.

Another major prison, the Model Jail (Cárcel Modelo) in Panama City, was built in 1920; over the years, however, it acquired a sinister reputation. Its biggest problem, one not unique to the Model Jail or to Panama, was overcrowding. Cells intended to house three inmates were frequently found to have as many as fifteen; this severe overcrowding may have accounted for the large number of pretrial detainees that were sent to Coiba. First offenders confined to the Model Jail were not always segregated from hardened criminals, a pattern that prevailed throughout most of the prison system. Prisoners awaiting trial were often confined for extended periods before their cases appeared on a court docket, and there were complaints that rights to habeas corpus had been violated by holding some offenders incommunicado.

There is a jail in each provincial capital. Similar complaints of overcrowding and human rights abuses have been reported from the outlying provinces.

In contrast to the conditions under which male prisoners serve sentences and await trial, women receive much better care. The Women's Rehabilitation Center (Centro Femenino de Rehabilitación) in Panama City has received praise. The center is under the supervision of the Department of Corrections, but is operated by nuns who have established a reputation for discipline tempered by humaneness and decency. Few complaints are reported from prisoners at the women's center. When first arrested, however, women are sometimes held overnight or for several nights at the Model Jail where, even though segregated, they experience conditions that differ little from those described for men.

As of October 2024, Panama's prison population reached 24,286 inmates, nearly doubling from 14,000 a decade prior. This surge has led to severe overcrowding, with occupancy levels at 167.8% of the system's official capacity of 14,591. Over 60% of inmates are in pretrial detention, highlighting systemic delays in judicial proceedings.
