= Constitution of Panama =

The Republic of Panama is governed under the Constitution of Panama of 1972 as amended in 1978, 1983, 1993, 1994, and 2004. This is Panama's fourth constitution, previous constitutions having been adopted in 1904, 1941, and 1946. The differences among these constitutions have been matters of emphasis and have reflected the political circumstances existing at the time of their formulation.

Panama's successive constitutions have been respected to varying degrees by the republic's governments. Since the 1968 coup, opponents of various governments have accused them of violating the spirit and, at times, the letter of the constitution and of invoking the state of emergency provisions for purely political purposes. The creation of public confidence in the rule of law established by the constitution posed one of the major challenges to the government in the late 1980s.

== Earlier constitutions ==
=== 1904 constitution ===
The 1904 constitution, in Article 136, gave the United States the right to "intervene in any part of Panama, to reestablish public peace and constitutional order." Article 136, along with other provisions of the Hay–Bunau-Varilla Treaty, such as that giving the United States the right to add additional territory to the Canal Zone whenever it believed this was necessary for defensive purposes, rankled Panamanian nationalists for more than three decades.

Amendments were made to the constitution in 1918. These amendments abolished capital punishment; stipulated that the President was elected by direct vote; and specified that the terms of deputies in the lower legislative chamber were four years.

=== 1941 and 1946 constitutions ===
In 1939, the United States abrogated its right of intervention in internal Panamanian affairs with the ratification of the Hull-Alfaro Treaty. The 1941 constitution, enacted during Arnulfo Arias's first, brief presidential term, reflected the president's political views. Power was concentrated in the hands of the president, whose term, along with that of members of the legislature, was extended from four to six years. Citizenship requirements were added that discriminated against the nation's English-speaking black community and other non-Hispanic minorities.

In October 1941, President Arias was deposed by the National Police (the predecessor of the National Guard and the Panamanian Defense Forces), and the presidency was assumed by Ricardo Adolfo de la Guardia Arango. In 1946, President de la Guardia promulgated a new constitution, which was basically a return to the 1904 document without the offensive Article 136.

=== 1972 constitution ===
The 1946 constitution was in effect for 26 years. Following the 1968 military coup, 11 constitutional guarantees, including freedom of speech, press, and travel, were suspended for several months, and some were not fully restored until after the adoption of the 1972 constitution. The 1972 constitution was promulgated by General Torrijos and reflected the dominance of the political system by the general and the military.

Article 277 of the 1972 Constitution temporarily transferred the president's role as head of government to Torrijos. He was given the title "Maximum Leader of the Panamanian Revolution", with near-absolute powers for a period of six years. He had the power to appoint most government officials and to direct foreign relations. On October 11, 1978, this and other temporary provisions of the 1972 constitution expired, and a series of amendments, ratified by the Torrijos-controlled National Assembly of Municipal Representatives, became law. These amendments called for a gradual return to democratic political processes between 1978 and 1984 and were designed, in part, to assuage US concerns over the undemocratic nature of the Panamanian political system.

=== 1983 amendments ===
In 1983, a commission representing various political parties was created to further amend the constitution in preparation for the 1984 elections. The 16-member commission changed nearly half of the constitution's articles, producing several significant alterations. Article 2 had given the military a special political role, but the revised draft omitted all mention of this. The legislature was also revamped.

The National Legislative Council was eliminated, and the unwieldy, government-controlled National Assembly of Municipal Representatives—which had 505 representatives, one from each corregimiento (municipal subdistrict)—became the Legislative Assembly, with 67 members apportioned on the basis of population and directly elected. The independence of the judiciary and the Electoral Tribunal were strengthened, the term of the president was reduced to five years, and two vice presidents were to be elected. Guarantees of civil liberties were strengthened, and official support for candidates in elections was, at least in theory, severely restricted.

== Constitution ==
Power emanates from the people and is exercised by the three branches of government, each of which is "limited and separate", but all of which, in theory, work together in "harmonious collaboration." The national territory is defined as "the land area, the territorial sea, the submarine continental shelf, the subsoil, and air space between Costa Rica and Colombia." Any ceding, leasing, or other alienation of this territory to any other state is expressly forbidden. Spanish is the country's national language.

The amended constitution contains 328 articles, grouped into 1 preamble and 15 titles as follows:

- Preamble
- Title I The Panamanian State (article 1-7)
- Title II Nationality and Immigration (article 8-16)
- Title III Individual and Social Rights and Duties (article 17-130)
- Title IV Political Rights (article 131-145)
- Title V The Legislative Organ (article 146-174)
- Title VI The Executive Body (article 175-200)
- Title VII The Administration of Justice (article 201-224)
- Title VIII Municipal and Provincial Regimes (article 225-256)
- Title IX The Public Treasury (article 257-281)
- Title X The National Economy (article 282-298)
- Title XI The Public Servants (article 299-309)
- Title XII Public Force (article 310-312)
- Title XIII Reform of the Constitution (article 313-314)
- Title XIV The Panama Canal (article 315-323)
- Title XV Final and Transitory Provisions (article 324-328)
